= Maryland Route 157 =

State highway in Baltimore County, Maryland, US

Maryland Route 157
- Maryland Route 157 highlighted in red

Route information
- Maintained by MDSHA
- Length: 4.79 mi (7.71 km)
- Existed: 1991–present

Major junctions
- South end: I-695 / MD 158 in Sparrows Point
- North end: I-695 in Dundalk

Location
- Country: United States
- State: Maryland
- Counties: Baltimore

Highway system
- Maryland highway system; Interstate; US; State; Scenic Byways
← MD 156	→ MD 158

Maryland Route 157 (MD 157) is a state highway located in Baltimore County in the U.S. state of Maryland. The state highway runs 4.79 miles (7.71 km) from MD 158 in Sparrows Point north to North Point Road in Dundalk. MD 157 is an L-shaped highway serves as the primary highway through Dundalk and from Dundalk to Interstate 695 (I-695). The two highways to which MD 157 is assigned, Merritt Boulevard and Peninsula Expressway, were constructed as a four-lane divided county highway in the early 1960s. In the late 1960s, Merritt Boulevard was extended as ramps to I-695 that also serve MD 151 and MD 150. MD 157 was assigned to the highway in Sparrows Point in the early 1990s and extended through Dundalk to its present northern terminus in the late 1990s.

== Route description ==
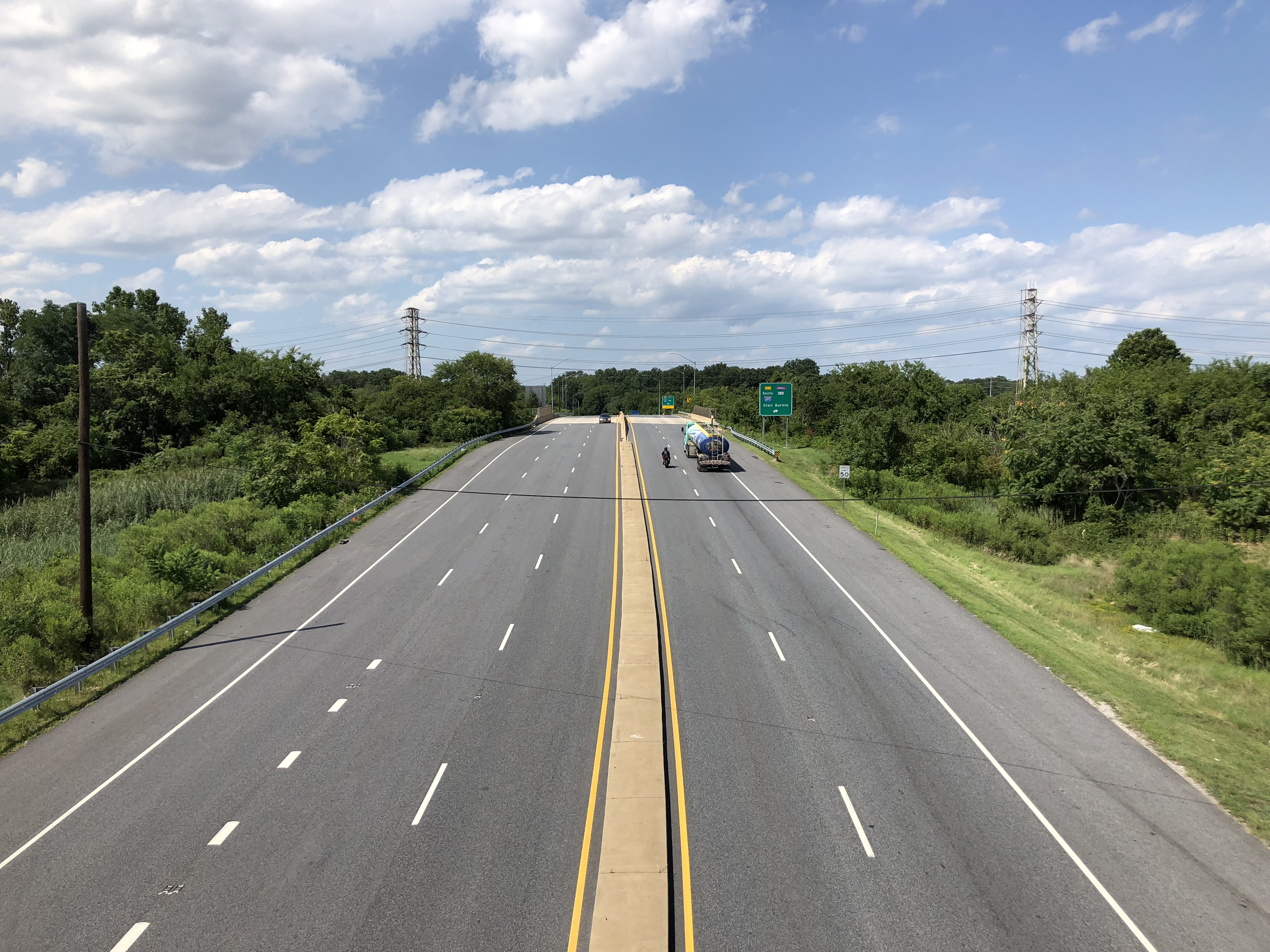
View north along MD 157 from I-695 in Edgemere

MD 157 begins at an intersection with MD 158 (Bethlehem Boulevard) just north of the former Bethlehem Steel complex in Sparrows Point. MD 158 is used to access northbound I-695 (Baltimore Beltway). MD 157 heads north as Peninsula Expressway, a four-lane divided highway that crosses over I-695 and has a half-cloverleaf interchange with southbound I-695 in the direction of the former Francis Scott Key Bridge. The state highway veers northwest and reduces to a four-lane undivided highway at Reservoir Road. MD 157 crosses Bear Creek on a drawbridge and expands to a four-lane divided highway that enters Dundalk. The state highway crosses over the CSX rail spur between Baltimore and Sparrows Point before reaching Merritt Boulevard. MD 157 turns northeast onto Merritt Boulevard; the roadway continues straight as Merritt Avenue toward Sollers Point Road. The state highway passes through the Dundalk communities of Stanbrook and Eastfield, through which the highway passes several shopping centers. From the intersection of Holabird Avenue and Wise Avenue north to German Hill Road, the highway has six lanes. After crossing Bread and Cheese Creek, MD 157 reaches its northern terminus at North Point Road. The roadway continues through a partial interchange with MD 151 (North Point Boulevard) and has ramps to and from MD 150 (Eastern Avenue) in the direction of Essex before merging with I-695 in the direction of Essex.

MD 157 is a part of the National Highway System as a principal arterial from Holabird Avenue and Wise Avenue to its northern terminus within Dundalk.

== History ==
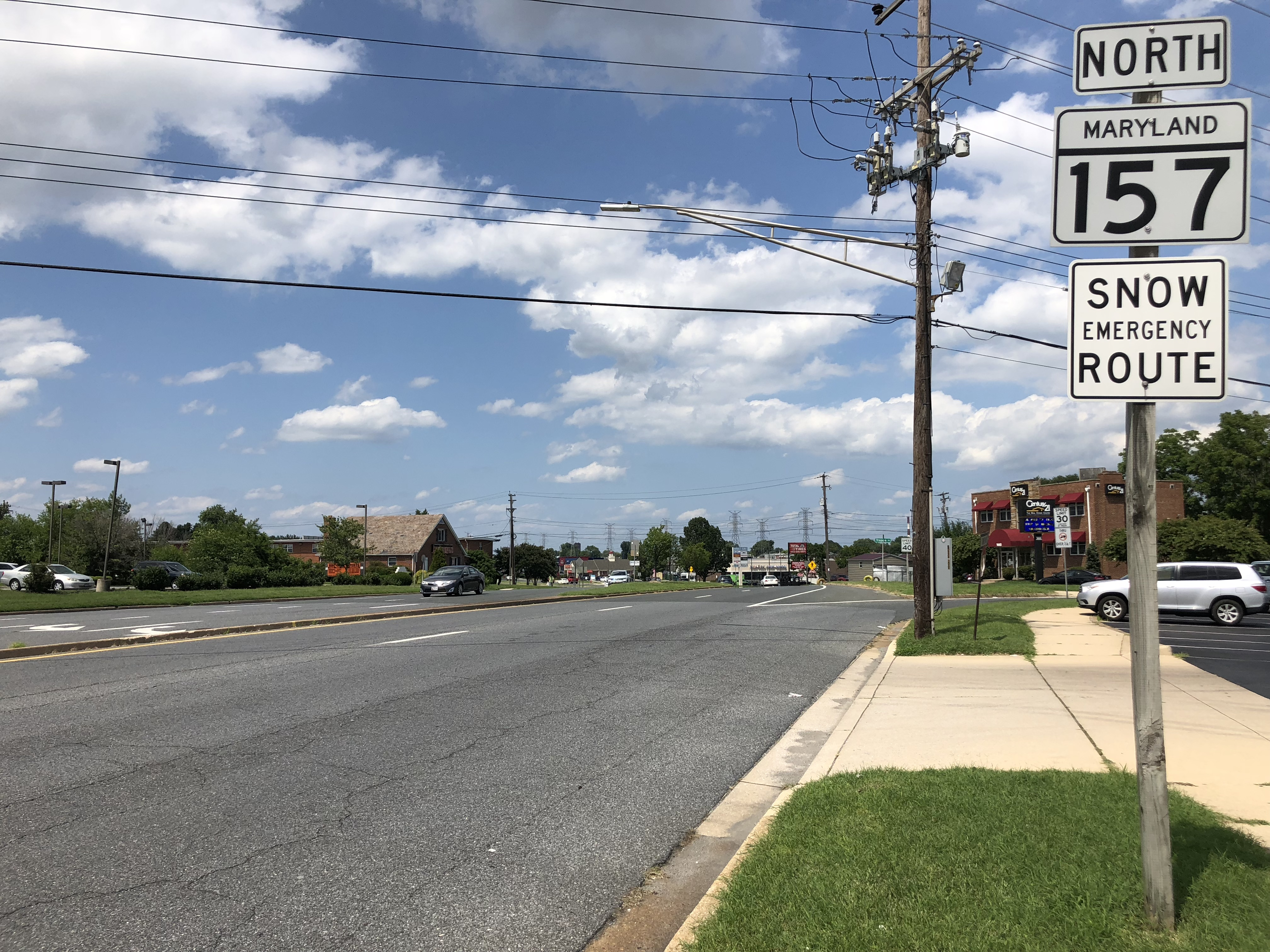
View north along MD 157 at Wise Avenue in Dundalk

The original MD 157 was Chapel Road from MD 462 near Webster to Havre de Grace in Harford County, which was removed from the state highway system in 1956. Meritt Boulevard was constructed as a four-lane divided highway from North Point Road, which was then part of MD 20, to the center of Dundalk in 1960. Peninsula Expressway was built from the center of Dundalk to Sparrows Point, including a new bridge over Bear Creek, in 1960 and 1961. Like the pre-existing drawbridge to the west that carried Dundalk Avenue over Bear Creek, the Peninsula Expressway bridge carried a toll from its completion through March 13, 1980, when tolls were removed from both Dundalk bridges. The Dundalk Avenue bridge was removed around 1985.

In 1963, the existing road north from the Merritt Boulevard – North Point Road intersection was expanded to a divided highway through its junction with MD 151. This section of highway was reconstructed in 1968 and 1969 as the ramps between North Point Road and I-695 that also serve MD 151 and MD 150. The portion of Peninsula Expressway south of the Bear Creek bridge was brought into the state highway system as MD 157 around 1991. When I-695 was transformed from a two-lane viaduct to a four-lane surface freeway between 1995 and 1999, MD 157's interchange with MD 158 was transformed into an interchange with I-695. The remainder of Peninsula Expressway and Merritt Boulevard to North Point Boulevard became part of MD 157 around 1999.

On May 27, 2016, the Maryland State Highway Administration closed the drawbridge that carries MD 157 across Bear Creek due to "significant corrosion". It reopened three weeks later after an initial phase of repairs with further repairs planned for late summer and early fall.

On March 26, 2024, after the Francis Scott Key Bridge collapsed, the ramp to southbound I-695 was closed.

== Junction list ==
The entire route is in Baltimore County.

Location	mi	km	Destinations	Notes
Sparrows Point	0.00	0.00	MD 158 (Bethlehem Boulevard) to I-695 north – Edgemere, Essex	Southern terminus
Sparrows Point	0.18	0.29	I-695 Toll south (Baltimore Beltway) – Francis Scott Key Bridge, Glen Burnie	Closed due to collapse of Francis Scott Key Bridge; I-695 Exit 43
Dundalk	2.73	4.39	Merritt Boulevard south / Merritt Avenue north to Sollers Point Road	MD 157 turns northeast onto Merritt Boulevard
Dundalk	4.79	7.71	I-695 (Baltimore Beltway) / MD 151 (North Point Boulevard) / MD 150 east (Eastern Avenue) / North Point Road – Towson, Essex, Baltimore, Sparrows Point	Northern terminus at intersection with North Point Road; I-695 Exit 39; roadway continues straight as ramps to I-695, MD 151, and MD 150
1.000 mi = 1.609 km; 1.000 km = 0.621 mi: Closed/former
