= Maryland Route 158 =

State highway in Baltimore County, Maryland, known as Bethlehem Blvd

Maryland Route 158
- Bethlehem Boulevard
- Maryland Route 158 highlighted in red

Route information
- Maintained by MDSHA
- Length: 2.35 mi (3.78 km)
- Existed: 1991–present

Major junctions
- West end: Riverside Drive in Sparrows Point
- MD 157 in Sparrows Point; MD 151 in Edgemere
- East end: North Point Road in Edgemere

Location
- Country: United States
- State: Maryland
- Counties: Baltimore

Highway system
- Maryland highway system; Interstate; US; State; Scenic Byways
← MD 157	→ MD 159

Maryland Route 158 (MD 158) is a state highway located in Baltimore County in the U.S. state of Maryland. Known as Bethlehem Boulevard, the state highway runs 2.35 miles (3.78 km) from Riverside Drive in Sparrows Point east to North Point Road in Edgemere. MD 158 parallels Interstate 695 (I-695) along the northern edge of the former Bethlehem Steel complex at Sparrows Point and connects MD 157 with MD 151. Bethlehem Boulevard was constructed as a four-lane divided county highway with several interchanges in the late 1950s. The highway was designated MD 158 in the early 1990s. When I-695 was completely rebuilt and expanded from two to four lanes through Sparrows Point and Edgemere in the late 1990s, MD 158 was also reconstructed as a mostly two-lane highway without interchanges.

== Route description ==
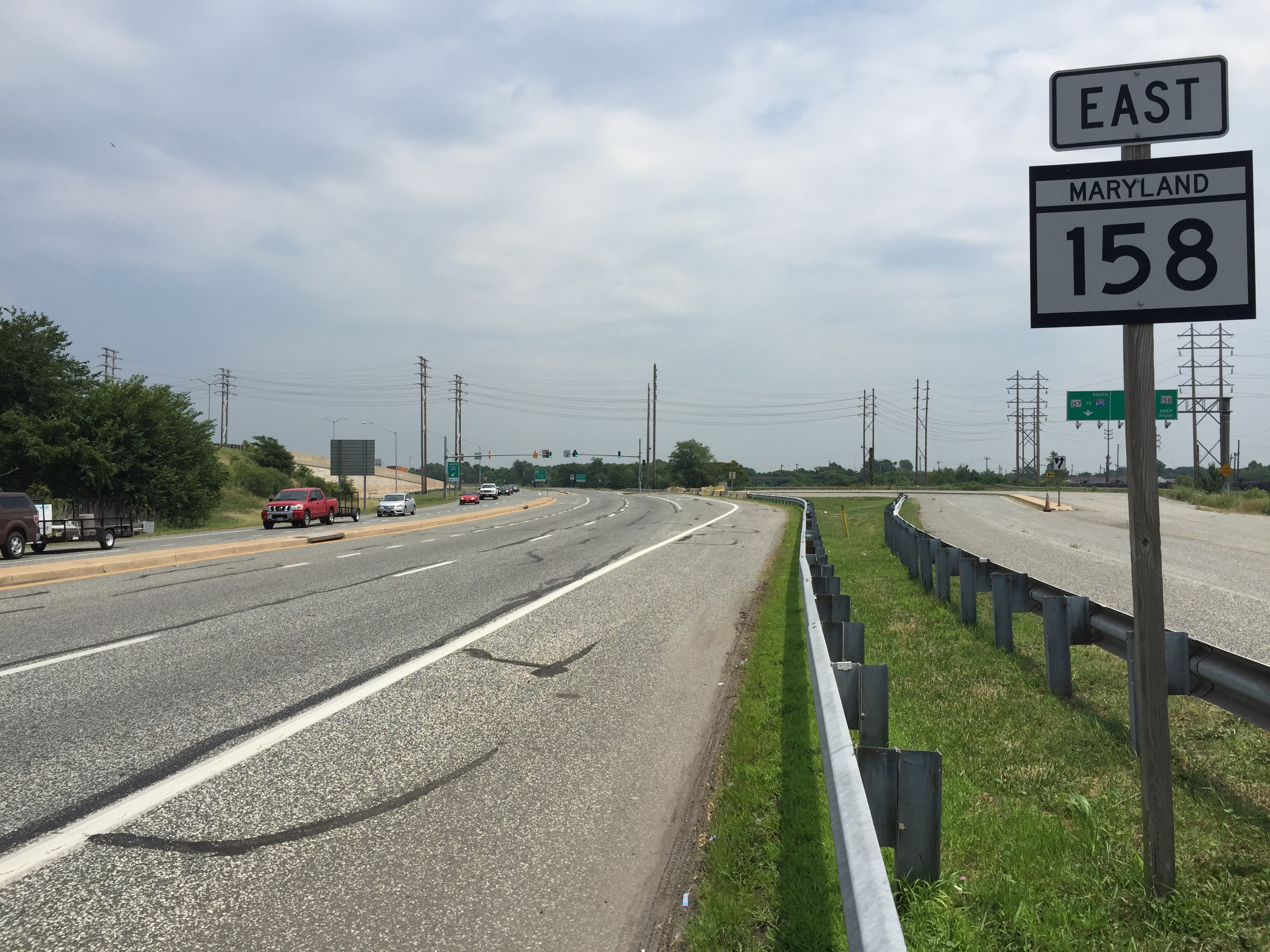
View east along MD 158 at MD 157 in Sparrows Point

MD 158 begins at a tangent intersection with Riverside Drive, which follows the western edge of the former Bethlehem Steel complex (now home to mixed industrial uses) on Bear Creek in Sparrows Point. The two-lane undivided state highway curves east and closely parallels the northbound lanes of I-695 (Baltimore Beltway); the two highways are separated by a Jersey barrier. After the highways cross mud flats, MD 158 veers away from the Beltway, expands to a four-lane divided highway, and receives a ramp from the northbound Interstate. The state highway meets the southern end of MD 157 (Peninsula Expressway), which provided access to southbound I-695, which (prior to 2024) headed toward the now-destroyed Francis Scott Key Bridge. Beyond an entrance to the steel complex and a ramp to northbound I-695, the divided highway reduces to two lanes and again closely parallels the Beltway and meets the northern end of Wharf Road, which is unsigned MD 151B. The two highways curve northeast, then diverge as MD 158 temporarily becomes an undivided highway as it crosses over a Tradepoint Rail line. The state highway intersects MD 151 (North Point Boulevard) before reaching its eastern terminus at North Point Road, which heads south as the main street of Edgemere.

== History ==
The original MD 158 was Belcamp Road from the Bush River at modern U.S. Route 40 north to Creswell Road near Riverside in Harford County. This state highway was constructed by 1915 and removed from the state highway system in 1956. Bethlehem Boulevard was built as a four-lane divided highway between 1957 and 1959. The highway's original western terminus was at Dundalk Avenue, which crossed Bear Creek on a drawbridge from Dundalk. Both the Dundalk Avenue bridge and the 1960-built Peninsula Expressway drawbridge were toll bridges through 1977; the Dundalk Avenue bridge was removed around 1985.

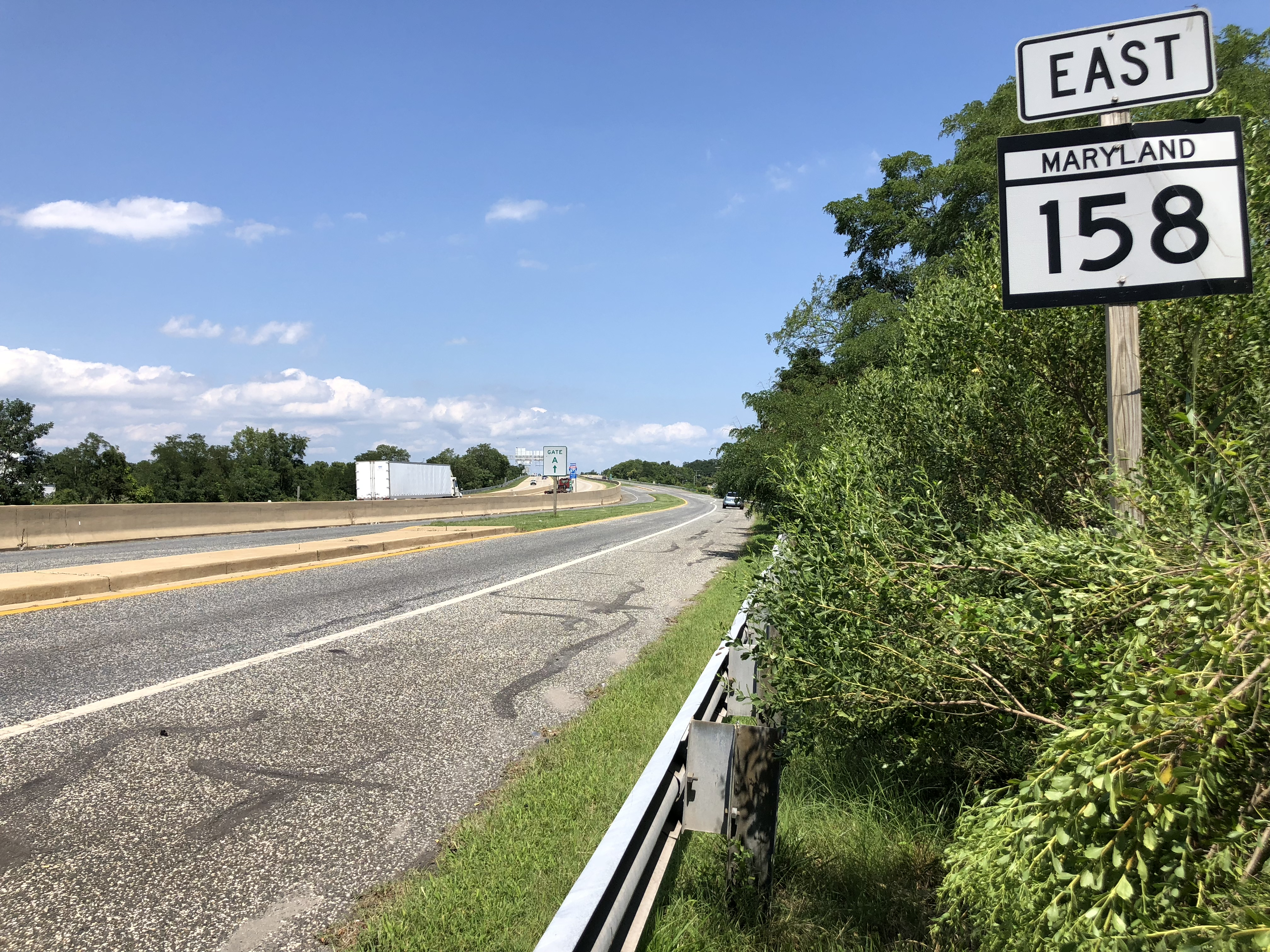
MD 158 eastbound in Sparrows Point

Bethlehem Boulevard was built with four interchanges. The western terminus of the highway was a trumpet interchange with Tin Mill Road (now Riverside Drive) where the mainline continued northwest as Dundalk Avenue across the drawbridge. Bethlehem Boulevard had a cloverleaf interchange with the Peninsula Expressway that featured a wide split in the median. East of the Peninsula Expressway interchange was a partial interchange with Wharf Road that offered access from Wharf Road to and from the west. The fourth junction was a partial interchange with MD 151 that allowed access between Bethlehem Boulevard to the west and MD 151 to the north. Eastbound Bethlehem Boulevard continued east to MD 20 (North Point Road). When MD 695 (now I-695) was completed as a two-lane freeway on a viaduct parallel to Bethlehem Boulevard from Edgemere to the Key Bridge in 1977, the only changes to the interchanges were two pairs of ramps from the west at the Peninsula Expressway interchange and from the east at the MD 151 interchange.

Bethlehem Boulevard was brought into the state highway system as MD 158 around 1991 concurrent with MD 157 being assigned to the Peninsula Expressway south of Bear Creek. Between 1995 and 1999, I-695 was transformed from a two-lane freeway on a viaduct to a four-lane surface-level freeway between Edgemere and the Key Bridge. As part of the project, MD 158 was reconstructed. Most of the state highway was reduced to two lanes and relocated parallel to I-695 instead of passing under the Interstate Highway. In addition, all four of MD 158's interchanges were removed. Westbound MD 158 at its interchange with MD 157 became a collector-distributor lane for westbound I-695's interchange with MD 157.

== Junction list ==
The entire route is in Baltimore County.

Location	mi	km	Destinations	Notes
Sparrows Point	0.00	0.00	Riverside Drive	Western terminus
Sparrows Point	1.07	1.72	MD 157 north (Peninsula Expressway) to I-695 Toll south – Francis Scott Key Bridge, Dundalk	Southern terminus of MD 157
Sparrows Point	1.20	1.93	I-695 north (Baltimore Beltway) – Essex	I-695 Exit 43
Sparrows Point	1.52	2.45	Wharf Road south	Unsigned MD 151B
Edgemere	2.21	3.56	MD 151 (North Point Boulevard) to I-695 north – Dundalk, Sparrows Point	
Edgemere	2.35	3.78	North Point Road	Eastern terminus
1.000 mi = 1.609 km; 1.000 km = 0.621 mi
