= Maryland Route 151 =

State highway in Maryland, US, known as North Point Blvd

Maryland Route 151
- MD 151 highlighted in red

Route information
- Maintained by MDSHA and Baltimore DOT
- Length: 10.80 mi (17.38 km)
- Existed: 1927–present

Major junctions
- South end: 7th Street in Sparrows Point
- MD 158 in Edgemere; I-695 in Dundalk; MD 157 in Dundalk; MD 150 in Dundalk; I-895 in Baltimore; US 40 in Baltimore
- North end: US 1 / US 40 Truck in Baltimore

Location
- Country: United States
- State: Maryland
- Counties: Baltimore, City of Baltimore

Highway system
- Maryland highway system; Interstate; US; State; Scenic Byways
← MD 150	→ MD 152

Maryland Route 151 (MD 151) is a state highway in the U.S. state of Maryland. Known for most of its length as North Point Boulevard, the state highway runs 10.80 miles (17.38 km) from 7th Street in Sparrows Point north to U.S. Route 1 (US 1) in Baltimore. MD 151 is a four- to six-lane divided highway that connects the communities of Edgemere and Dundalk on the Patapsco River Neck peninsula of southeastern Baltimore County with industrial areas in Sparrows Point and East Baltimore. MD 151 was originally constructed in the early 1920s from Sparrows Point to Edgemere. The highway was connected to Baltimore by the Baltimore County portion of MD 20, a number also assigned to the highway from Rock Hall to Chestertown in Kent County. During World War II, MD 151 was extended north through Dundalk on a new divided highway parallel to MD 20 and through East Baltimore on an expanded Erdman Avenue to connect the Bethlehem Steel complex at Sparrows Point with MD 150 and US 40. In the late 1960s and early 1970s, Interstate 695 (I-695) was constructed parallel to MD 151 between Edgemere and MD 157 in Dundalk.

== Route description ==
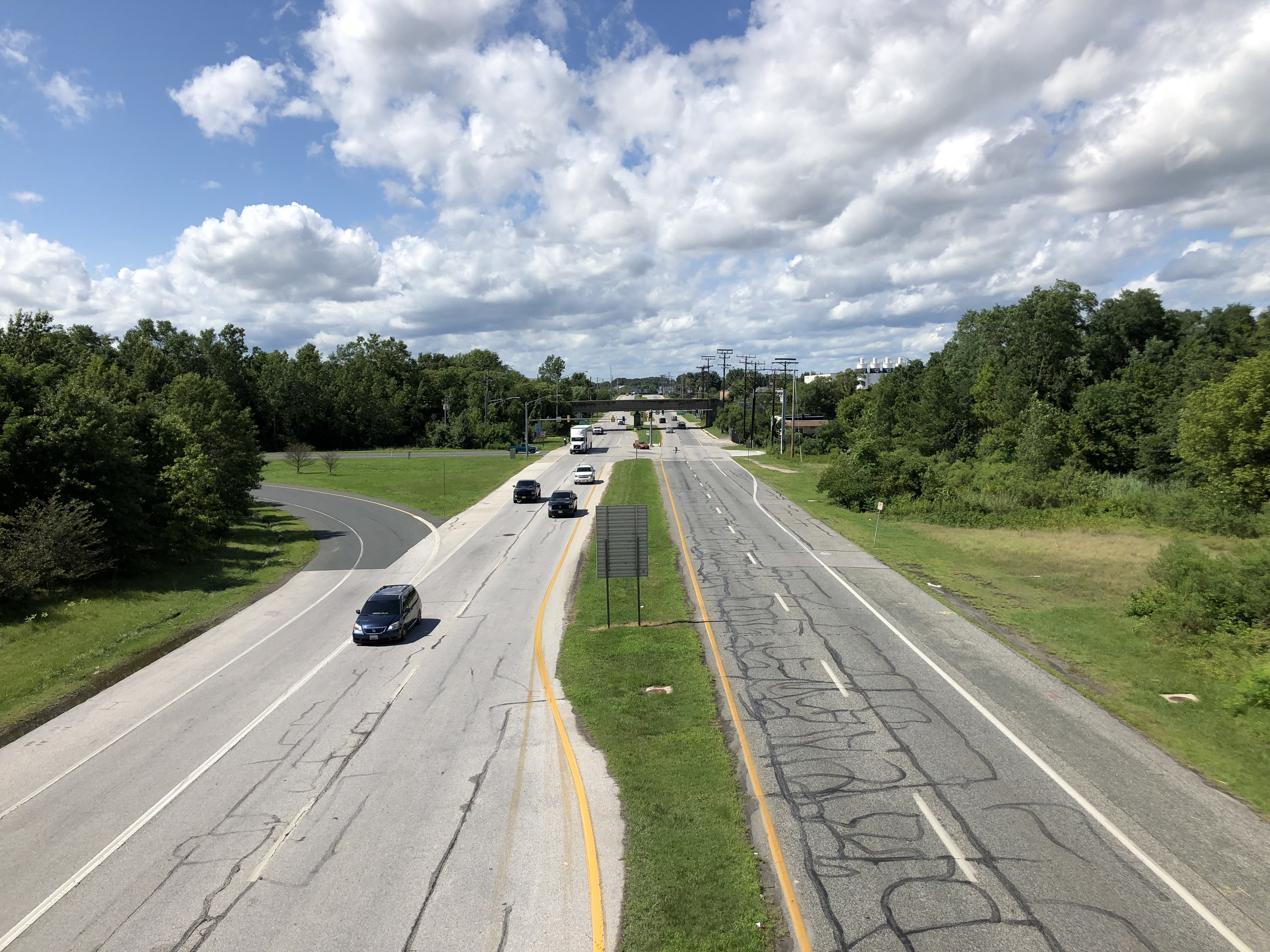
MD 151 northbound at I-695 in Edgemere

MD 151 begins at an intersection with 7th Street within the former Bethlehem Steel complex. Sparrows Point Boulevard continues south to a gate south of F Street. MD 151 heads northeast as a four-lane divided highway. The state highway leaves the former steel complex by crossing over a Tradepoint Rail line and Wharf Road, also identified as MD 151B, with which MD 151 has a modified trumpet interchange. At Sparrows Point Road, MD 151's name changes to North Point Boulevard and the highway curves north to bypass Edgemere. The state highway intersects MD 158 (Bethlehem Boulevard); to the east MD 158 provides access to North Point Road, which heads south through Edgemere toward North Point State Park and Fort Howard. Just north of MD 158, MD 151 has a partial interchange with I-695 (Baltimore Beltway), which includes a ramp from MD 151 to northbound I-695 and a loop ramp from southbound I-695 to MD 151. The movements to and from the Francis Scott Key Bridge to the south were made via MD 158 to the west before it collapsed from being struck by a ship in 2024.

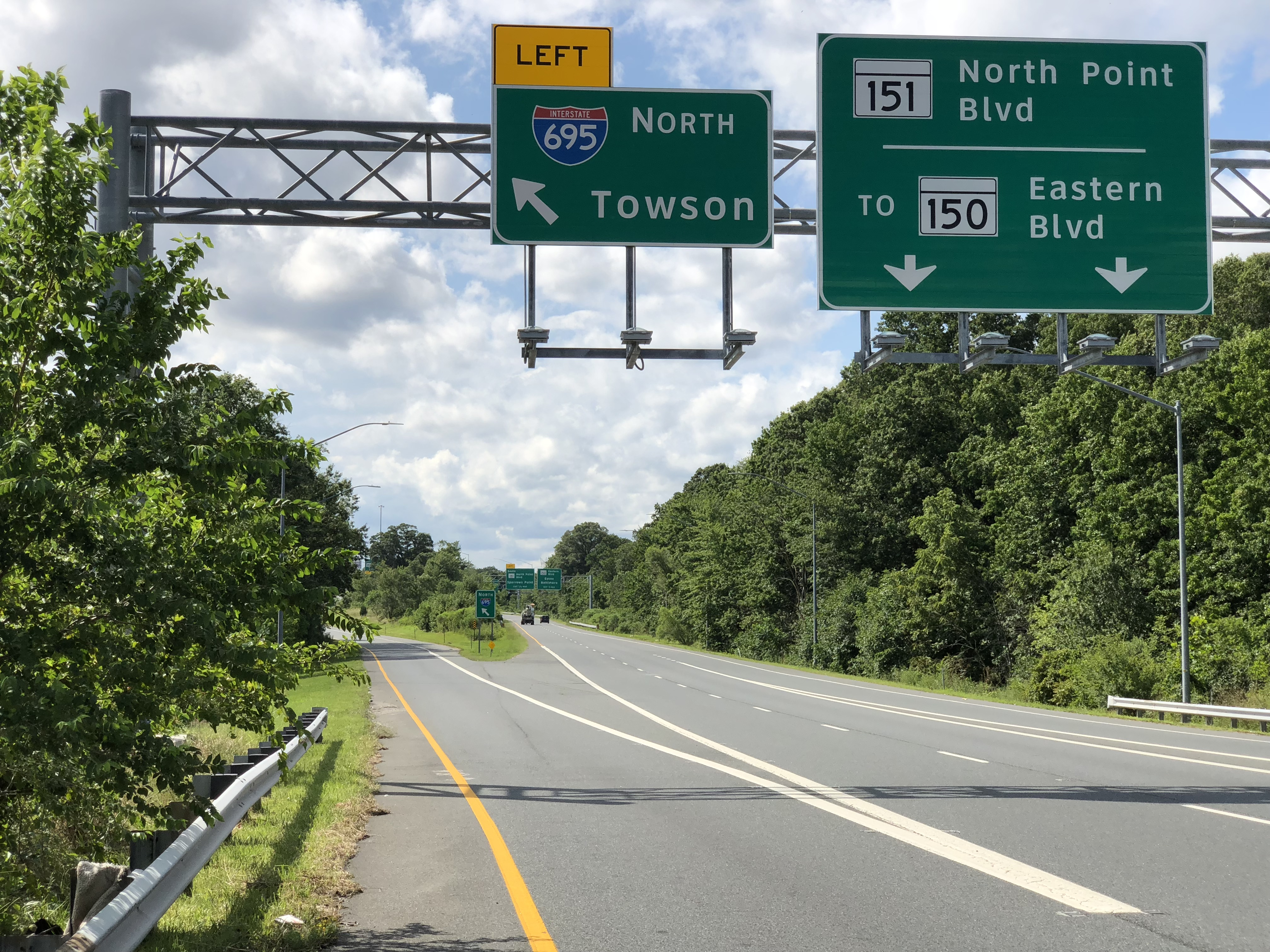
MD 151 northbound at I-695 in Dundalk

MD 151 passes under Norfolk Southern Railway's Sparrows Point Industrial Track line and intersects Wise Avenue before passing through the North Point Village neighborhood of Dundalk, where the highway is paralleled by North Point Road on the east. At Cove Road, a connector between MD 151 and I-695, North Point Road switches to the west side of MD 151. The area north of North Point Village, where the Patapsco River Neck narrows to a width of 1 mile (1.6 km) between the Back River and Bear Creek, was the site of the Battle of North Point, a September 12, 1814, engagement that was part of the encompassing Battle of Baltimore in the War of 1812. At Bread and Cheese Creek, northbound MD 151 crosses to the east side of I-695, which runs in the median of the state highway. Northbound MD 151 and northbound I-695 and the southbound directions of each highway are connected to each other by ramps. Northbound MD 151 crosses over I-695 and has a U-turn ramp before the highway's partial cloverleaf interchange with the ramps between I-695 and the northern end of MD 157 (Merritt Boulevard). There is no access from northbound MD 151 to MD 157 or between MD 151 and the ramps to I-695. The state highway continues northwest along the southern edge of the Eastpoint Mall ahead of its cloverleaf interchange with MD 150 (Eastern Avenue), then enters an industrial area where the highway has a grade crossing of the Canton Railroad.

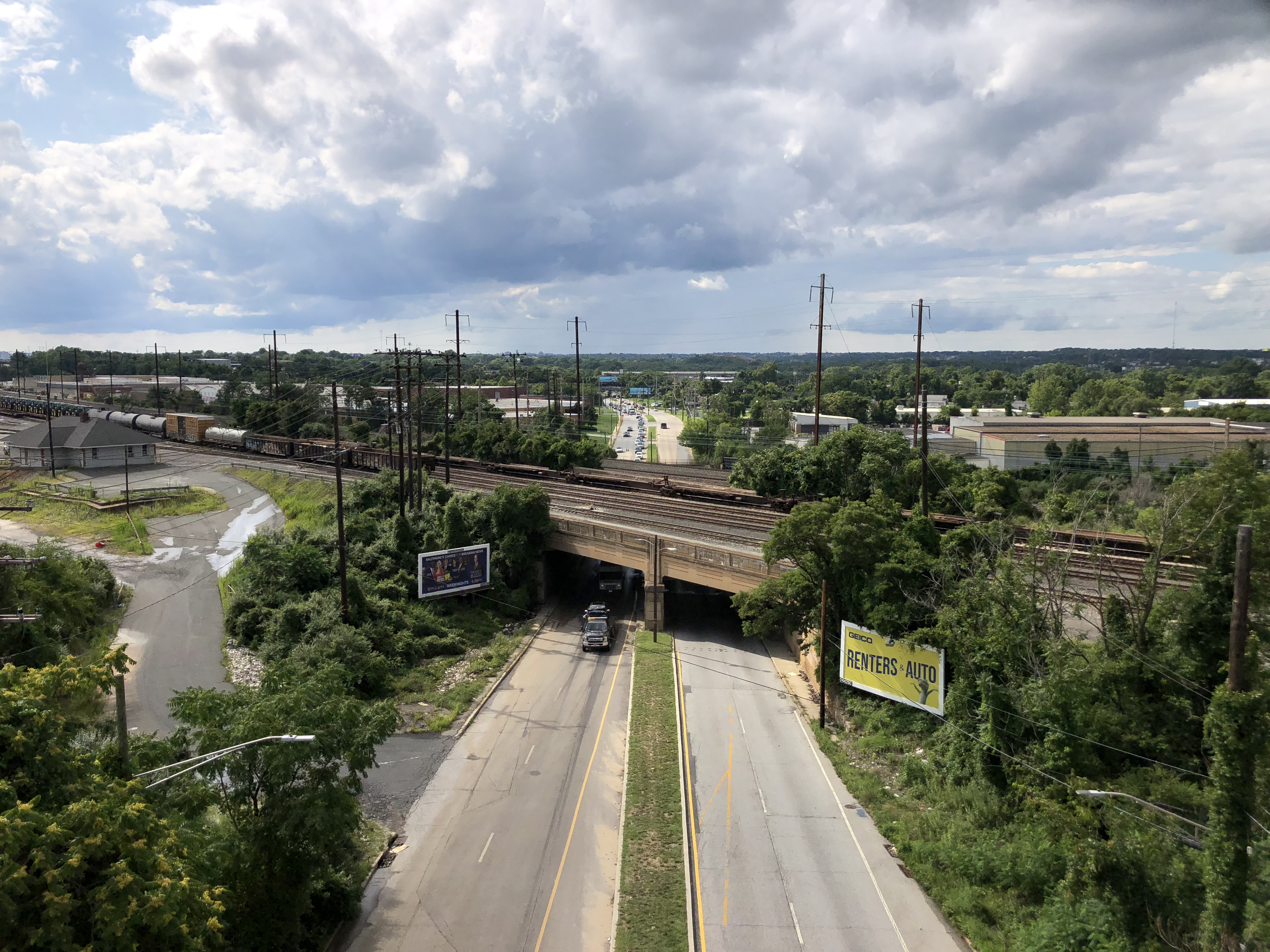
MD 151 northbound at I-95 in Baltimore

MD 151 enters the city of Baltimore just west of its intersection with Rolling Mill Road and Kane Street. The state highway passes under I-95, Norfolk Southern Railway's Bayview Yard, and Amtrak's Northeast Corridor railroad line. At North Point Road, MD 151's name changes to Erdman Avenue and the highway veers west to pass under CSX's Philadelphia Subdivision railroad line. The state highway veers northwest at its crossing of I-895 (Harbor Tunnel Thruway) just before the highway's cloverleaf interchange with US 40 (Pulaski Highway), which also includes a ramp from southbound MD 151 to southbound I-895. Connections between eastbound US 40 and northbound MD 151 are made via Mapleton Avenue just east of I-895. MD 151 continues northwest concurrent with US 40 Truck as a six-lane boulevard between the Armistead Gardens neighborhood to the east and industrial facilities on the west. The state highway passes by Archbishop Curley High School and through the Belair-Edison neighborhood before reaching its northern terminus at US 1 (Belair Road), onto which US 40 Truck turns west. Erdman Avenue continues northwest as a two-lane undivided street along the eastern edge of Clifton Park to MD 147 (Harford Road).

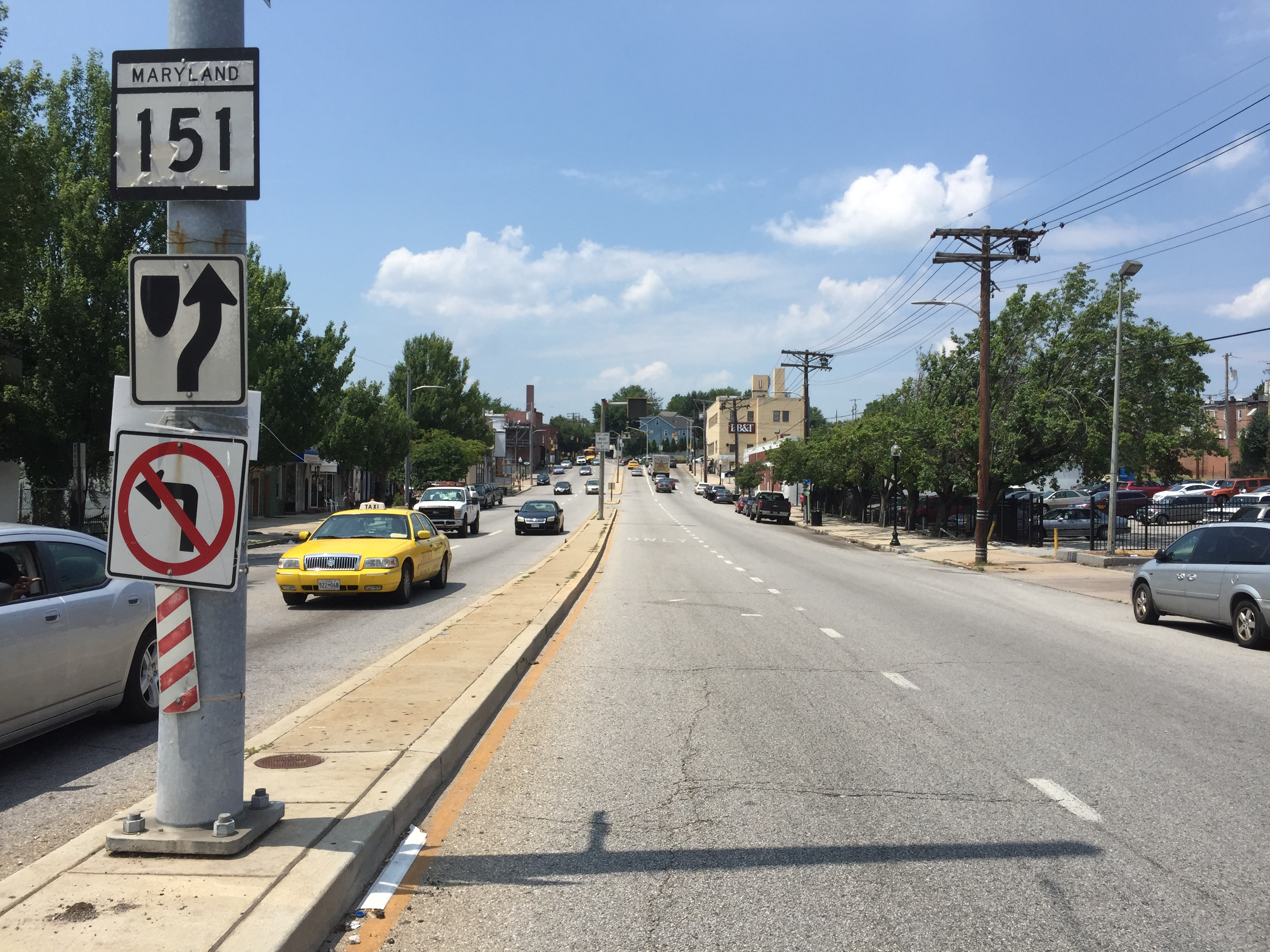
View north along MD 151 at Edison Highway and Mannasota Avenue in Baltimore

MD 151 is a part of the National Highway System as an intermodal connector from I-695 in Dundalk to I-95 in Baltimore and as a principal arterial from I-95 to its northern terminus at US 1 in Baltimore.

== History ==
MD 151 was originally assigned only to Sparrows Point Road, which was improved as a concrete road from the southern end of the highway at the Bethlehem Steel complex to North Point Road in Edgemere by 1921. North Point Road was also built as a concrete road from Edgemere to the North Point are of Dundalk by 1921. That highway, which was designated MD 20 in 1927, was extended south toward Fort Howard and north from North Point to US 40 in Baltimore in 1923. By 1934, heavy traffic between Baltimore and Sparrows Point led the Maryland State Roads Commission to recommend MD 151 and MD 20 from Sparrows Point to Baltimore be expanded from 20 to 40 feet (6.1 to 12.2 m) in width.

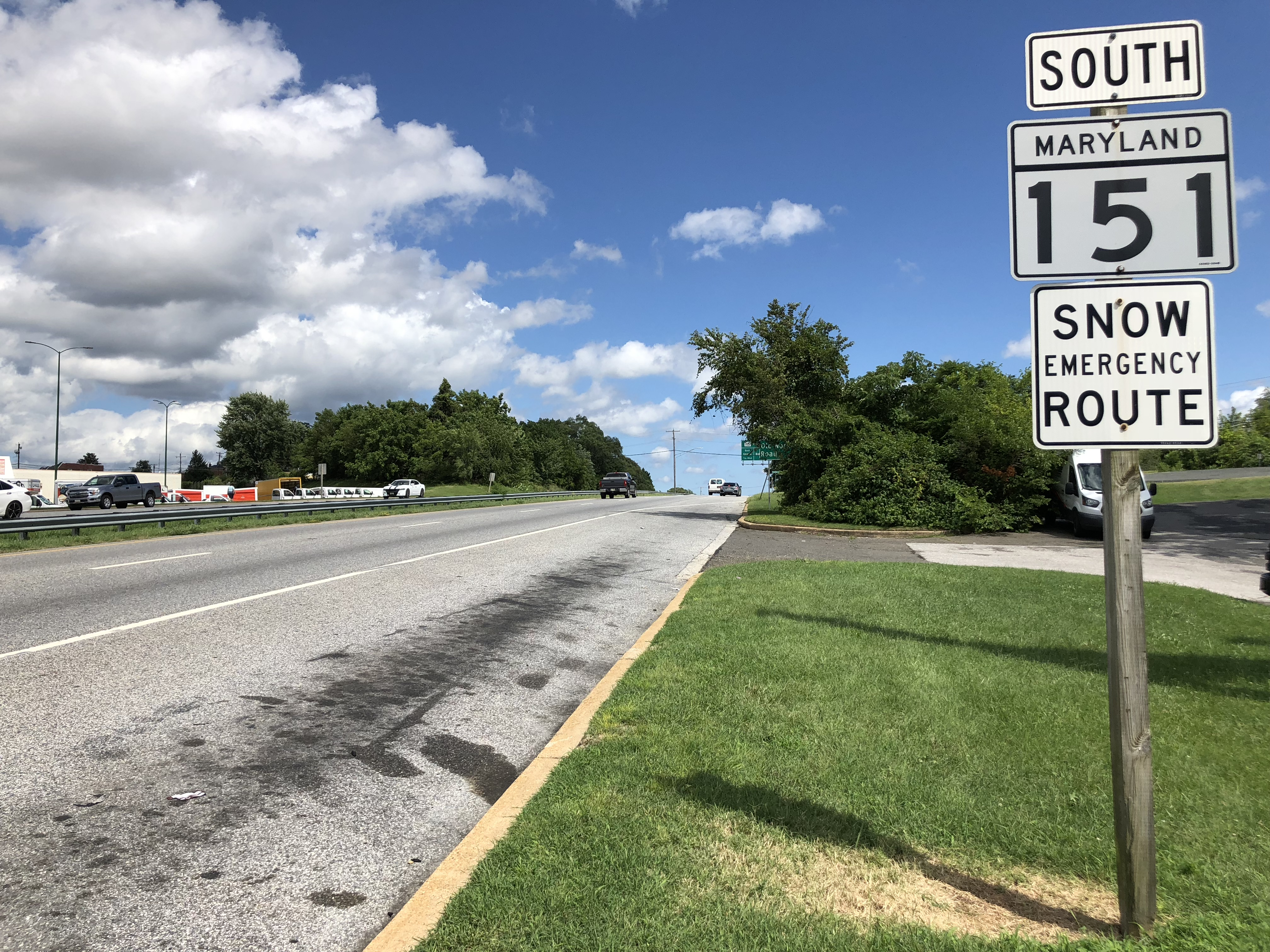
MD 151 southbound approaching MD 150 in Dundalk

Modern MD 151 was constructed between 1940 and 1944 as a defense access project to better connect Baltimore with Bethlehem Steel's steel mills and shipyards at Sparrows Point. MD 151 was reconstructed and extended north as a four-lane divided highway from Sparrows Point to Wise Avenue in Dundalk between 1940 and 1942. This construction included the highway's bypass of Edgemere; the bypassed portion of Sparrows Point Road from the expanded highway east to MD 20 was designated MD 718 by 1946. In Baltimore, Erdman Avenue was expanded to a divided highway from US 1 to US 40 and extended south to North Point Road by 1942; MD 151's underpasses of the Baltimore and Ohio Railroad (now CSX) and Pennsylvania Railroad (now Amtrak) and its interchange with US 40 were completed at that time. MD 151 from Wise Avenue to the Baltimore City line was constructed between 1942 and 1944; this work included the cloverleaf interchange with MD 150.

With the construction of modern MD 151, MD 20 was split into several disjoint segments of North Point Road: one from near Fort Howard to MD 151 in Edgemere, another along the northbound side of MD 151 from Edgemere to North Point Village, a third on the southbound side of MD 151 from North Point Village to the MD 150–MD 151 interchange, and a fourth between MD 151 and US 40 in Baltimore. The Baltimore City segment was removed from the state highway system in 1956. The portion of MD 20 from near Fort Howard to MD 718 in Edgemere was transferred to county maintenance in 1987. The remaining portions of MD 20 and MD 718 were removed from the state highway system around 1999.

MD 151's interchanges with Wharf Road in Sparrows Point and with MD 20 and Bethlehem Boulevard in Edgemere were built by 1963. The state highway's partial interchange with Merritt Boulevard was constructed in 1969 and the crossover interchange with I-695 was built in 1971. I-695 was completed between Merritt Boulevard and MD 151 in Edgemere in 1974. In 1999, as part of the reconstruction of I-695 from the Key Bridge to Edgemere from a two-lane viaduct to a four-lane surface freeway, MD 151's interchange with MD 20 and MD 158 in Edgemere was reduced to a standard intersection and the highway's present partial interchange with I-695 was built.

== Junction list ==
County	Location	mi	km	Destinations	Notes
Baltimore	Sparrows Point	0.00	0.00	7th Street west / Sparrows Point Boulevard south	Southern terminus
Baltimore	Sparrows Point	0.53	0.85	Wharf Road	Trumpet interchange; unsigned MD 151B
Baltimore	Edgemere	1.72	2.77	MD 158 (Bethlehem Boulevard) to I-695 south (Baltimore Beltway) – Dundalk, Glen Burnie	Southbound I-695 is closed due to the Francis Scott Key Bridge collapse
Baltimore	Edgemere	1.89	3.04	I-695 north (Baltimore Beltway) – Essex	I-695 Exit 42; southbound exit from and northbound entrance to I-695
Baltimore	Dundalk	5.43	8.74	I-695 north (Baltimore Beltway) – Towson, New York	I-695 Exit 40; northbound entrance and exit
Baltimore	Dundalk	5.57	8.96	I-695 south (Baltimore Beltway) – Glen Burnie	I-695 Exit 40; southbound entrance and exit
Baltimore	Dundalk	6.12	9.85	MD 157 south (Merritt Boulevard) – Dundalk	Partial cloverleaf interchange; no exit from northbound MD 151
Baltimore	Dundalk	6.85	11.02	MD 150 (Eastern Avenue) – Baltimore, Essex	Cloverleaf interchange
Baltimore City		8.70	14.00	I-895 south (Harbor Tunnel Thruway)	I-895 Exit 13; ramp to southbound I-895 and ramp from northbound I-895
Baltimore City		8.85	14.24	US 40 (Pulaski Highway)	Partial cloverleaf interchange; eastern terminus of US 40 Truck
Baltimore City		10.80	17.38	US 1 / US 40 Truck west (Belair Road) / Erdman Avenue north	Northern terminus
1.000 mi = 1.609 km; 1.000 km = 0.621 mi: Concurrency terminus; Incomplete access

== Auxiliary routes ==
- MD 151A is the designation for the 0.07-mile (0.11 km) one-lane ramp from northbound MD 151 to eastbound Sparrows Point Road between Sparrows Point and Edgemere.
- MD 151B is the designation for Wharf Road, which runs 0.60 miles (0.97 km) from its interchange with MD 151 north to its intersection with MD 158 in Sparrows Point. Wharf Road's trumpet interchange with MD 151 includes an intersection with county-maintained Wharf Road, which continues south along Jones Creek, and a teardrop median on the north side of the interchange between the road and the southbound MD 151 interchange ramps.
