= Interstate 695 (Maryland) =

Highway in Maryland

Interstate 695
- Baltimore Beltway; McKeldin Beltway
- I-695 highlighted in red

Route information
- Auxiliary route of I-95
- Maintained by MDSHA and MDTA
- Length: 51.46 mi (82.82 km)
- Existed: 1958–present
- NHS: Entire route

Major junctions
- Beltway around Baltimore
- Counterclockwise end: MD 173 in Baltimore City
- I-97 near Glen Burnie; MD 295 near Linthicum; I-895 in Lansdowne; I-95 near Arbutus; US 40 near Catonsville; I-70 / MD 570 / MD 122 near Woodlawn; I-795 in Pikesville; I-83 / MD 25A near Timonium; US 1 near Bel Air; I-95 near White Marsh; US 40 in Rosedale
- Clockwise end: Route 695C in Dundalk

Location
- Country: United States
- State: Maryland
- Counties: Anne Arundel, Baltimore, City of Baltimore

Highway system
- Interstate Highway System; Main; Auxiliary; Suffixed; Business; Future; Maryland highway system; Interstate; US; State; Scenic Byways
← MD 694	→ MD 700

Interstate 695 (I-695) is a 51.46-mile-long (82.82 km) auxiliary Interstate Highway that constitutes a partial beltway extending around Baltimore, Maryland, United States. I-695 is officially designated the McKeldin Beltway but is colloquially referred to as either the Baltimore Beltway or 695. The route is an auxiliary route of I-95, intersecting that route southwest of Baltimore near Arbutus and northeast of the city near White Marsh. It also intersects other major roads radiating from the Baltimore area, including I-97 near Glen Burnie, the Baltimore–Washington Parkway (B–W Parkway; MD 295) near Linthicum, I-70 near Woodlawn, I-795 near Pikesville, and I-83 in the Timonium area.

Originally, a 19.37-mile (31.17 km) portion of the Baltimore Beltway between I-95 northeast of Baltimore and I-97 south of Baltimore was officially Maryland Route 695 (MD 695) and was not part of the Interstate Highway System, but was still signed as I-695. The Francis Scott Key Bridge that crossed over the Patapsco River was included in this section of the route before the bridge's collapse on March 26, 2024. The bridge and its approaches were maintained by the Maryland Transportation Authority (MDTA), while the remainder of the Baltimore Beltway is maintained by the Maryland State Highway Administration (MDSHA). The American Association of State Highway and Transportation Officials approved the redesignation of MD 695 as I-695 on April 29, 2024.

The Baltimore Beltway was first planned in 1949 by Baltimore County; the state eventually took over the project, becoming part of the Interstate Highway System planned in 1956. The length of the route from MD 2 south of Baltimore clockwise to U.S. Route 40 (US 40) northeast of the city opened in stages from 1955 to 1962, providing an Interstate bypass of Baltimore. It was the first beltway in the US to be built as part of the Interstate Highway System. Plans were made to finish the remainder of the route, with a diversion to the Windlass and Patapsco freeways, opened in 1973, following the cancelation of a more outer route that was to partly follow what is today MD 702 (Southeast Boulevard).

The Outer Harbor Crossing over the Patapsco River, which was dedicated to Francis Scott Key, who wrote "The Star-Spangled Banner", and its approaches were finished in 1977, completing the route around Baltimore. The approaches to the bridge were originally two lanes to accommodate a tunnel that was initially proposed to run under the river; in subsequent years, they were upgraded to a four-lane configuration compliant with Interstate Highway standards, allowing for this portion of the route to be signed as I-695 rather than MD 695. There are plans for I-695 that include high-occupancy toll (HOT) lanes to ease traffic. In addition, the northeastern interchange with I-95 was reconstructed in 2014 to accommodate express toll lanes that were added to I-95, and construction took place in 2016 to remove I-695's carriageway crossovers here.

== Route description ==
=== Curtis Creek to I-95 ===
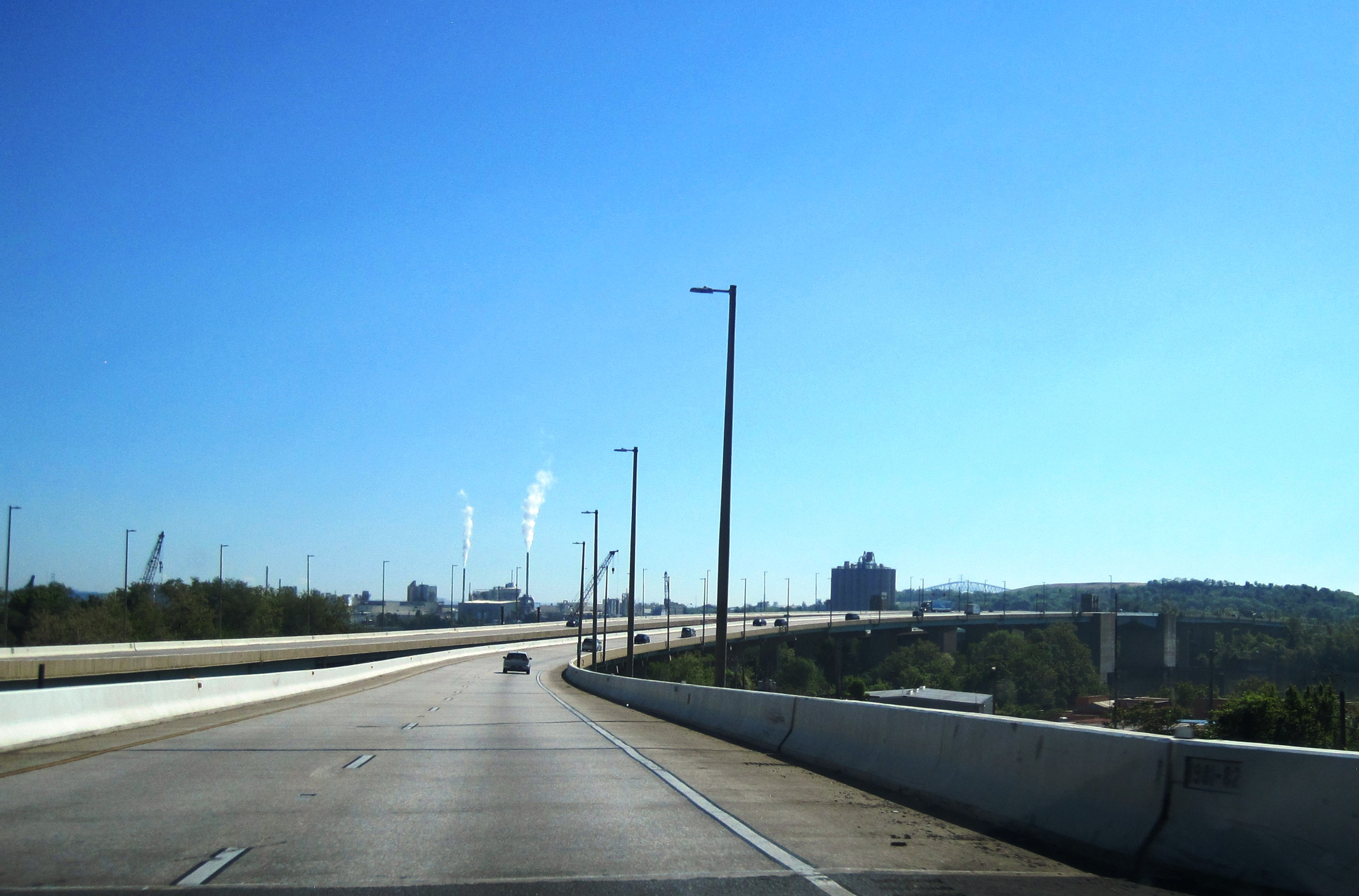
Curtis Creek Drawbridges as seen from I-695 outer; the center of the bascule bridge marks mile marker 0.0. In the distance at top right is the Francis Scott Key Bridge further east along I-695, which collapsed in 2024.

Starting at the zero milepost in Baltimore, I-695, which is maintained by the MDTA, is four lanes wide. The route passes over Curtis Creek on a pair of drawbridges here, which have 58 feet (18 m) of vertical navigational clearance and provide access for tall ships to a US Coast Guard base further upstream. Continuing west through industrial areas into Anne Arundel County, the route encounters the northern terminus of MD 10 (Arundel Expressway) at a directional interchange, where maintenance switches to MDSHA. The interchange includes access to the next interchange, with MD 2 (Ritchie Highway), a major north–south route between Baltimore and the southern suburbs, in Glen Burnie. This interchange has access to northbound MD 2 in both directions and from northbound MD 2 to the westbound direction. Beyond MD 2, I-695 encounters I-895B, a short connector to I-895 (Harbor Tunnel Thruway); this interchange provides access to southbound MD 2 from both directions and to the eastbound direction from southbound MD 2. Immediately past this interchange, I-695 comes to an interchange with the northern terminus of I-97, which terminates on the beltway.

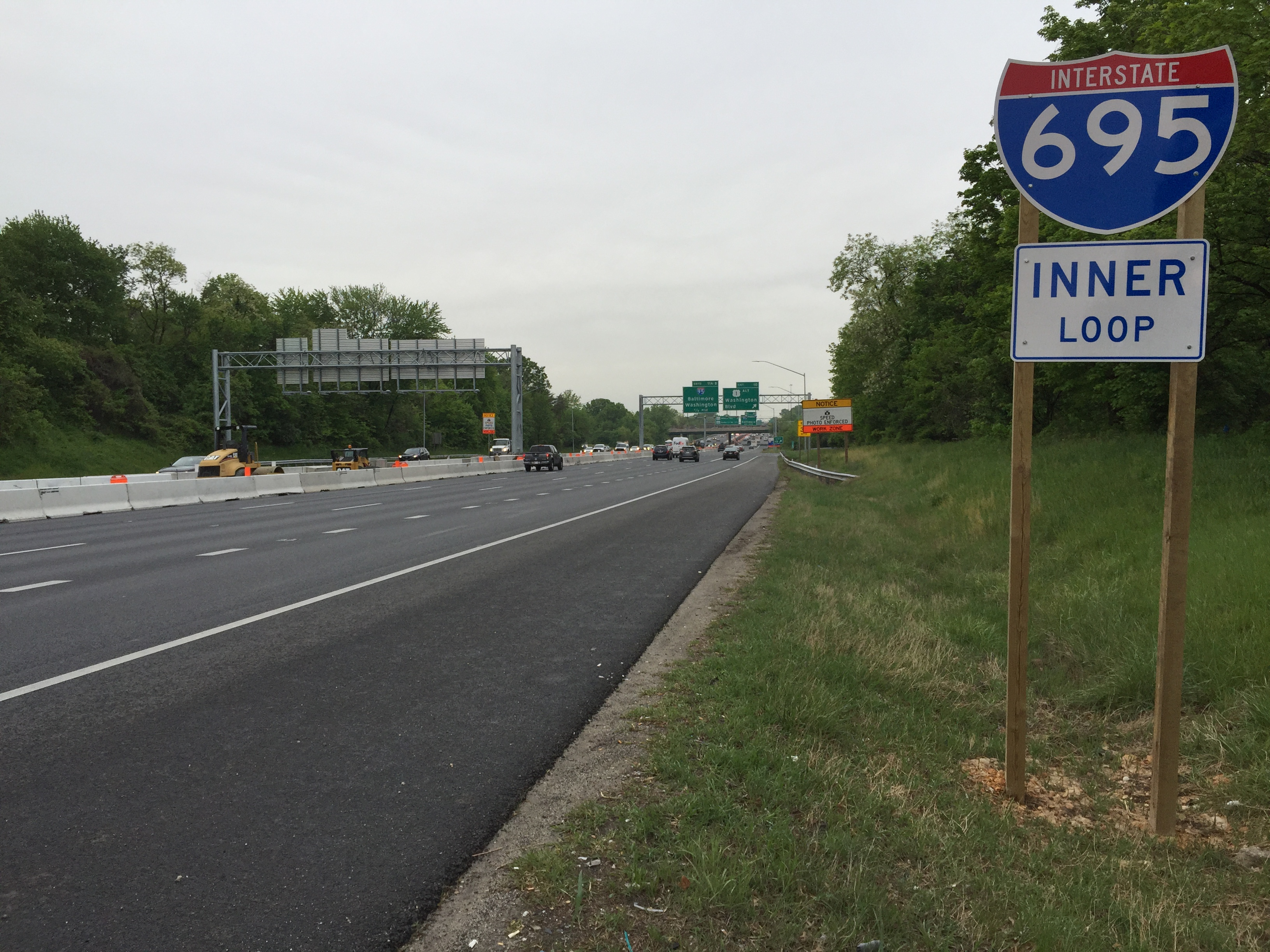
Inner Loop signage along the beltway between exits 9 and 10 in Halethorpe

The route continues west as a six-lane freeway, heading west into residential areas of Linthicum. It interchanges with MD 648 (Baltimore Annapolis Boulevard), where 132,330 vehicles travel I-695 every day, before turning northwest and intersecting MD 170 (Camp Meade Road) and passing over the Maryland Transit Administration (MTA)'s Baltimore Light RailLink. The route encounters the B–W Parkway (MD 295) at a cloverleaf interchange where the route's signage changes from east–west to north–south at this interchange. It turns more to the north from here and heads into commercial areas, interchanging with MD 168 (Nursery Road) and Hammonds Ferry Road. Past this interchange, the route crosses the Patapsco River into Baltimore County and soon encounters a partial interchange with I-895 (Harbor Tunnel Thruway) with access only from the southbound direction of I-695 to I-895 northbound and from I-895 southbound to the northbound direction of I-695. Past this interchange, I-695 heads north, interchanging with Hollins Ferry Road in Lansdowne before passing under CSX Transportation's Baltimore Terminal Subdivision and coming to an interchange with US 1 Alternate (US 1 Alt.; Washington Boulevard) in Arbutus. A short distance later, I-695 comes to a semi-directional interchange with I-95.

=== I-95 to I-70 ===
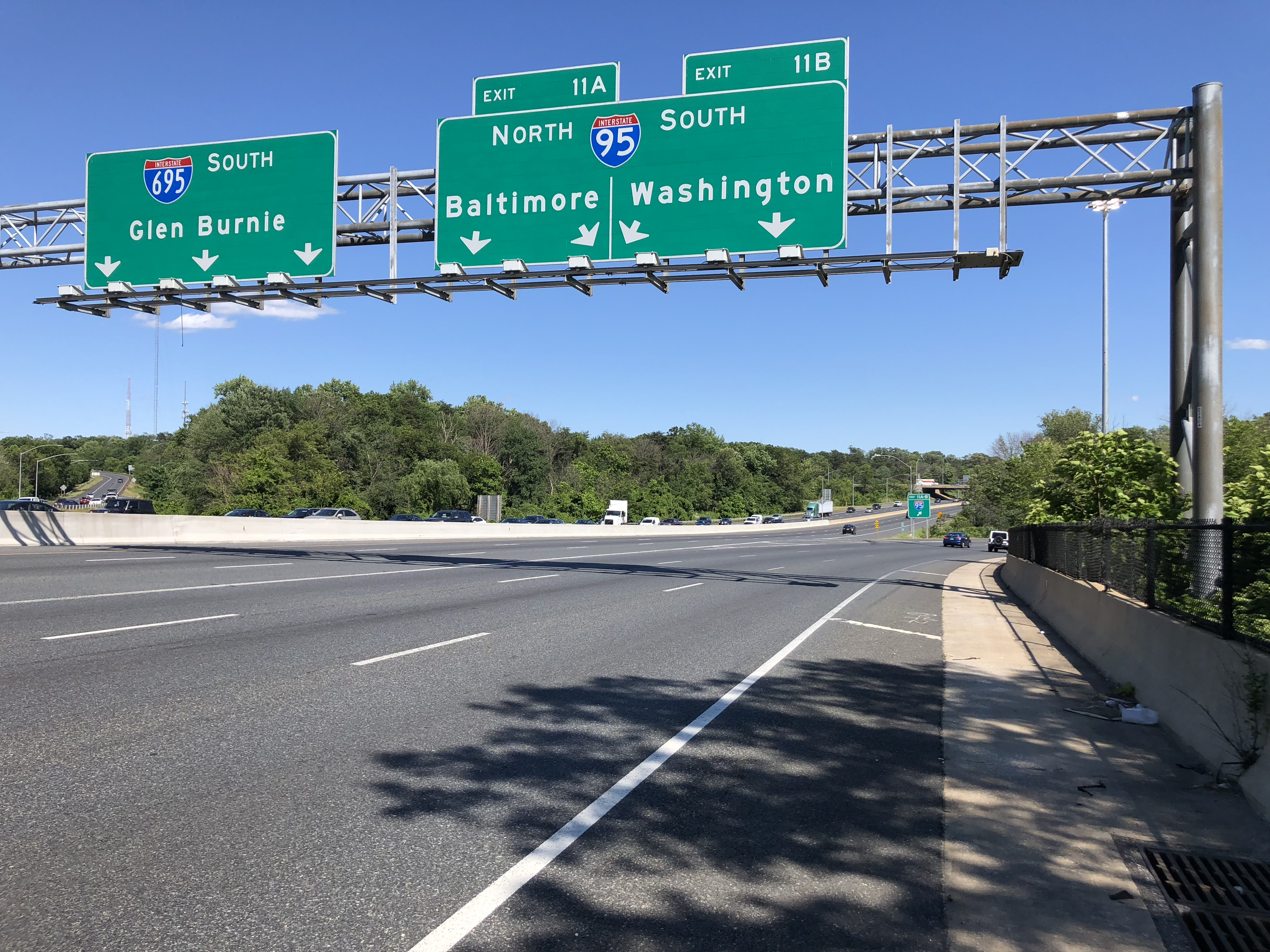
I-695 southbound at its southern junction with I-95 in Arbutus

I-695 widens to nine lanes past interchange with I-95, with five lanes in the southbound direction and four in the northbound direction. Running northwest, it crosses over Amtrak's Northeast Corridor and comes to a partial interchange with US 1 (Southwestern Boulevard), with a southbound exit and northbound entrance. From here, it continues northwest through residential areas of Catonsville to an interchange with MD 372 (Wilkens Avenue). Narrowing to eight lanes total, with four lanes in each direction, beyond MD 372, the route continues through suburban neighborhoods before coming to an interchange with MD 144 (Frederick Road). At this point, I-695 narrows to seven lanes, with three southbound and four northbound lanes. It continues north and interchanges with Edmondson Avenue before turning northwest and intersecting US 40 (Baltimore National Pike) near the defunct Westview Mall, now a big-box complex. Beyond US 40, I-695 continues north through residential areas, narrowing to six lanes, with three lanes in each direction, before coming to a four-level stack interchange with I-70/MD 570 in Woodlawn.

=== I-70 to I-83 ===
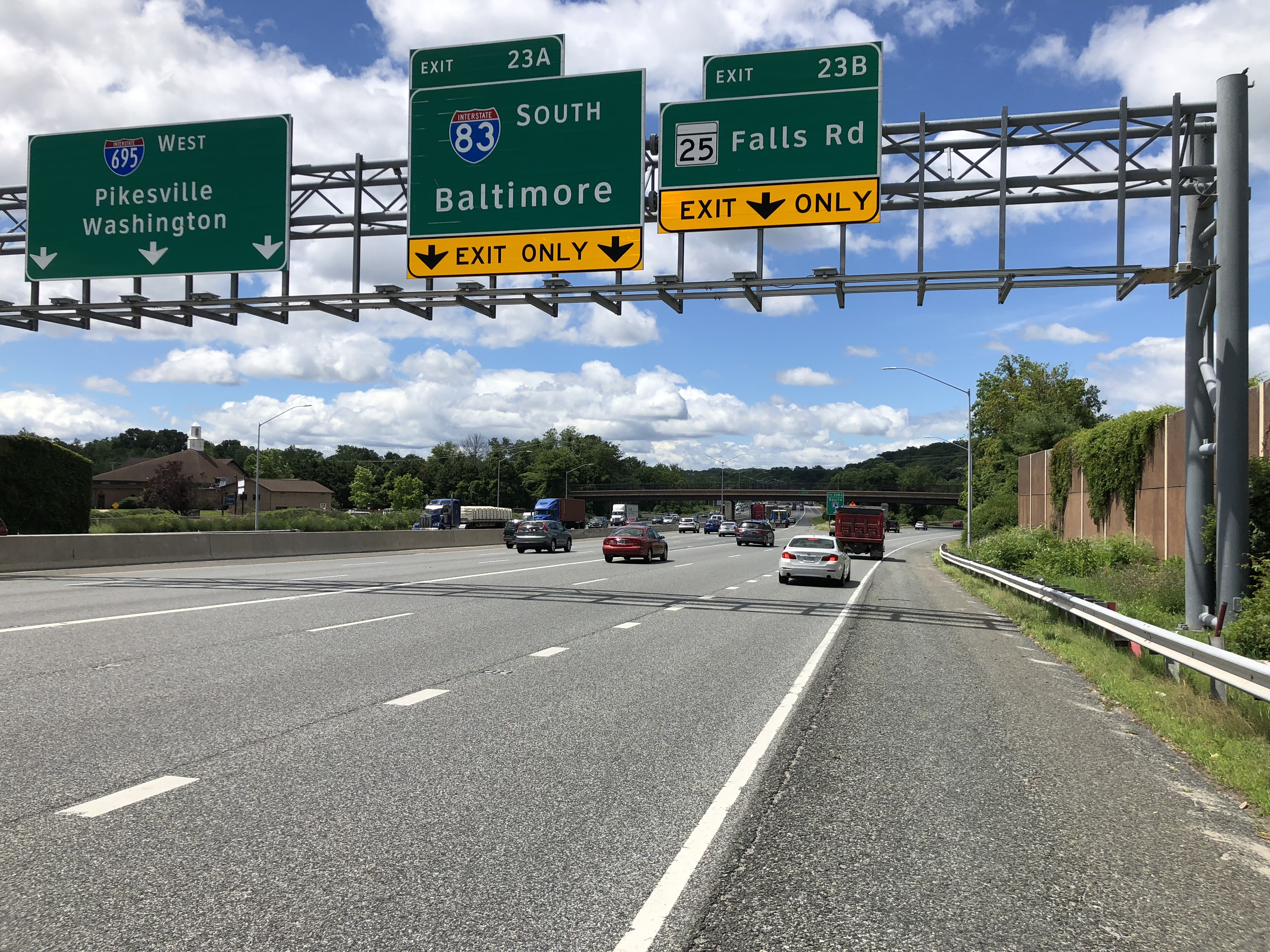
I-695 westbound near split with I-83 southbound northwest of Baltimore

The Baltimore Beltway narrows from seven to six lanes within the interchange, which contains braided ramps providing access to the next interchange, MD 122 (Security Boulevard), located near Security Square Mall and the headquarters of the Social Security Administration. Continuing north, the road widens to eight lanes again and continues through a mix of suburban homes and business parks in Lochearn. I-695 interchanges with MD 26 (Liberty Road) east of Randallstown and resumes north, narrowing to six lanes. It intersects the southern terminus of I-795 (Northwest Expressway), which serves as a bypass of MD 140 in the Owings Mills area. The MTA's Baltimore Metro SubwayLink line to Owings Mills passes under I-695 within the interchange and runs in the median of I-795 as far as that town. At the I-795 interchange, the signage of route changes from north–south to east–west.

From here, I-695 heads northeast as an eight-lane road and enters Pikesville, where it passes under CSX Transportation's Hanover Subdivision and intersects MD 140 (Reisterstown Road) at a single-point urban interchange. A short distance later, the road comes to a partial interchange with MD 129 (Park Heights Avenue), with an eastbound exit and westbound entrance. I-695 heads east to another partial interchange with Stevenson Road, which has a westbound exit and eastbound entrance. The Baltimore Beltway passes through heavily forested land as it encounters Greenspring Avenue. Past this interchange, I-695 continues northeast through woodland before coming to an interchange with I-83 (Jones Falls Expressway). The interchange includes connections to MD 25 (Falls Road), which heads into the open countryside north of Baltimore. Within this interchange, I-83 forms a concurrency with I-695, and the roadway widens to 10 lanes, with six for the beltway and four for I-83. In each direction, I-695 runs on the three leftmost lanes, while I-83 uses the two rightmost ones. After running concurrently, I-83 splits from I-695 by heading north on the Harrisburg Expressway at a directional interchange and continues towards Timonium, Cockeysville and Hunt Valley before reaching York, Pennsylvania.

=== I-83 to I-95 ===
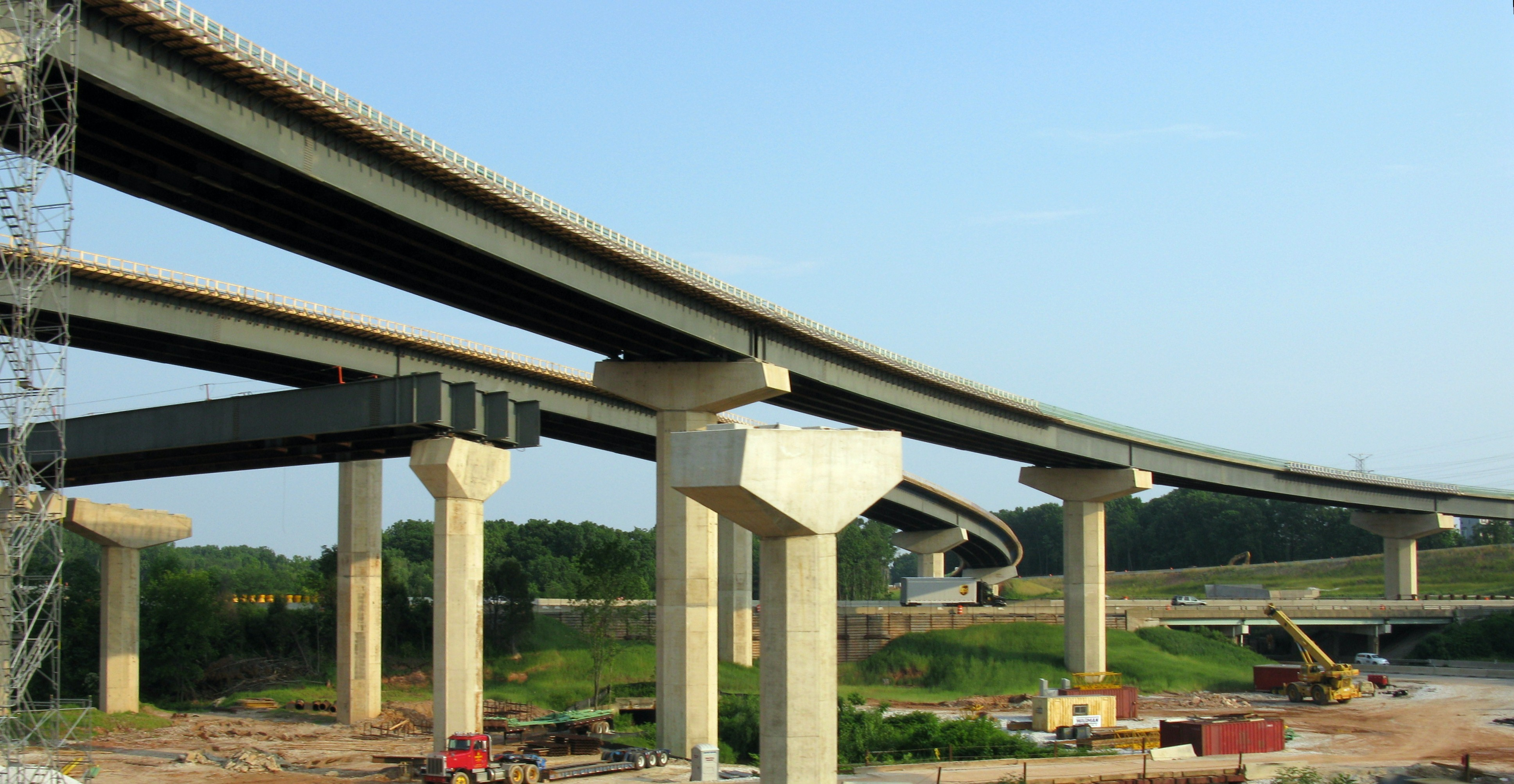
The then-under-construction interchange between I-95 and I-695 northeast of Baltimore

Beyond I-83, I-695 passes over the MTA's Baltimore Light RailLink and turns southeast as a six-lane road, heading into the county seat of Towson. Here, the road comes to an interchange with MD 139 (Charles Street). The Baltimore Beltway heads through residential and commercial areas before coming to interchanges with MD 45 (York Road) near The Shops at Kenilworth and MD 146 (Dulaney Valley Road). Continuing east, the Baltimore Beltway passes to the north of Goucher College and comes to an interchange with Providence Road. I-695 turns southeast through residential areas past Providence Road and comes to an interchange with MD 542 (Loch Raven Boulevard) and Cromwell Bridge Road. The road continues toward Parkville, where it comes to a cloverleaf interchange with MD 41 (Perring Parkway) within commercial areas. The Baltimore Beltway continues through residential areas into Carney, coming to another cloverleaf interchange with MD 147 (Harford Road). Continuing east into White Marsh, the route encounters the western terminus of MD 43 (White Marsh Boulevard), a limited-access at-grade boulevard that provides access to White Marsh Mall, US 1 and I-95.

I-695 turns south past MD 43 and interchanges with US 1 (Belair Road) south of White Marsh. The road continues southeast to an interchange with I-95 (John F. Kennedy Memorial Highway) a short distance after US 1 in Rossville. This interchange with I-95 (to the east of Baltimore city) is a fully directional interchange where the carriageways of both routes crossed over each other onto the opposite side, then crossed over each other again; at the site of each crossover, left-hand entrance and exit ramps were provided to eliminate the need for directional flyovers. In 2008, interchange reconstruction at the I-95 interchange removed the left-hand entrance from northbound I-95 to westbound I-695 with the remaining left-hand entrances to be removed by August 2009 as part of the construction of the I-95 Express Toll Lane Project; all exits and entrances were now on the right, and I-95's opposing roadways no longer crossed each other (but I-695's still did).

=== I-95 to Curtis Creek ===
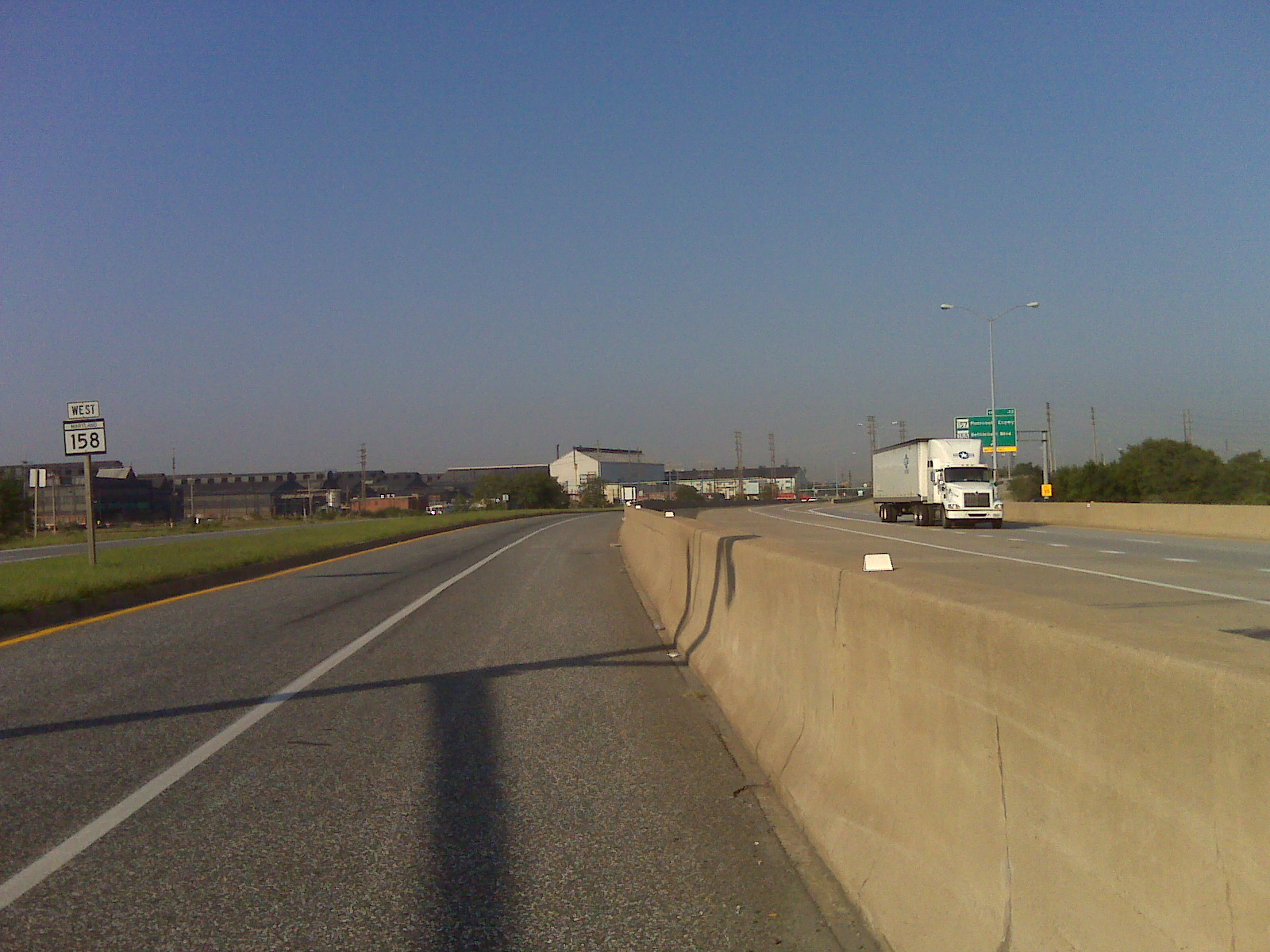
MD 158 (left) running alongside I-695 (right) in Dundalk

Continuing south, soon encounters MD 7 (Philadelphia Road). Between I-95 and MD 7, the route's changes from east–west to north–south. Immediately after MD 7, the route interchanges with US 40 (Pulaski Highway) northwest of Essex near The Centre at Golden Ring. After US 40, I-695 crosses over CSX Transportation's Philadelphia Subdivision and comes to a partial directional interchange with MD 702 (Southeast Boulevard). At this interchange, I-695 turns south onto the Windlass Freeway, crossing over the Northeast Corridor again within the interchange.

Running south along the Windlass Freeway, parallel to the Northeast Corridor, I-695, now narrowed to four lanes, turns west before making a sharp turn to the south, crossing over the railroad line twice. The road becomes the Patapsco Freeway and continues south to an interchange with MD 150 (Eastern Avenue) and MD 157 (Merritt Boulevard) near Eastpoint Mall. A short distance later, I-695 comes to an interchange with MD 151 (North Point Boulevard). From here, the route continues southeast along the Back River into residential and industrial Dundalk, interchanging with Cove Road. The route turns south, with the median briefly widening to include trees, before coming to another interchange with MD 151. Past MD 151, the Baltimore Beltway continues southwest through industrial areas, with maintenance switching to the MDTA at the crossing of a CSX Transportation rail line. It comes to an interchange with MD 157 (Peninsula Expressway) and MD 158 (Bethlehem Boulevard). The route runs past Tradepoint Atlantic before crossing over Bear Creek and interchanging with unsigned MD 695A (Broening Highway) south of the Dundalk Marine Terminal, with an eastbound exit and westbound entrance.

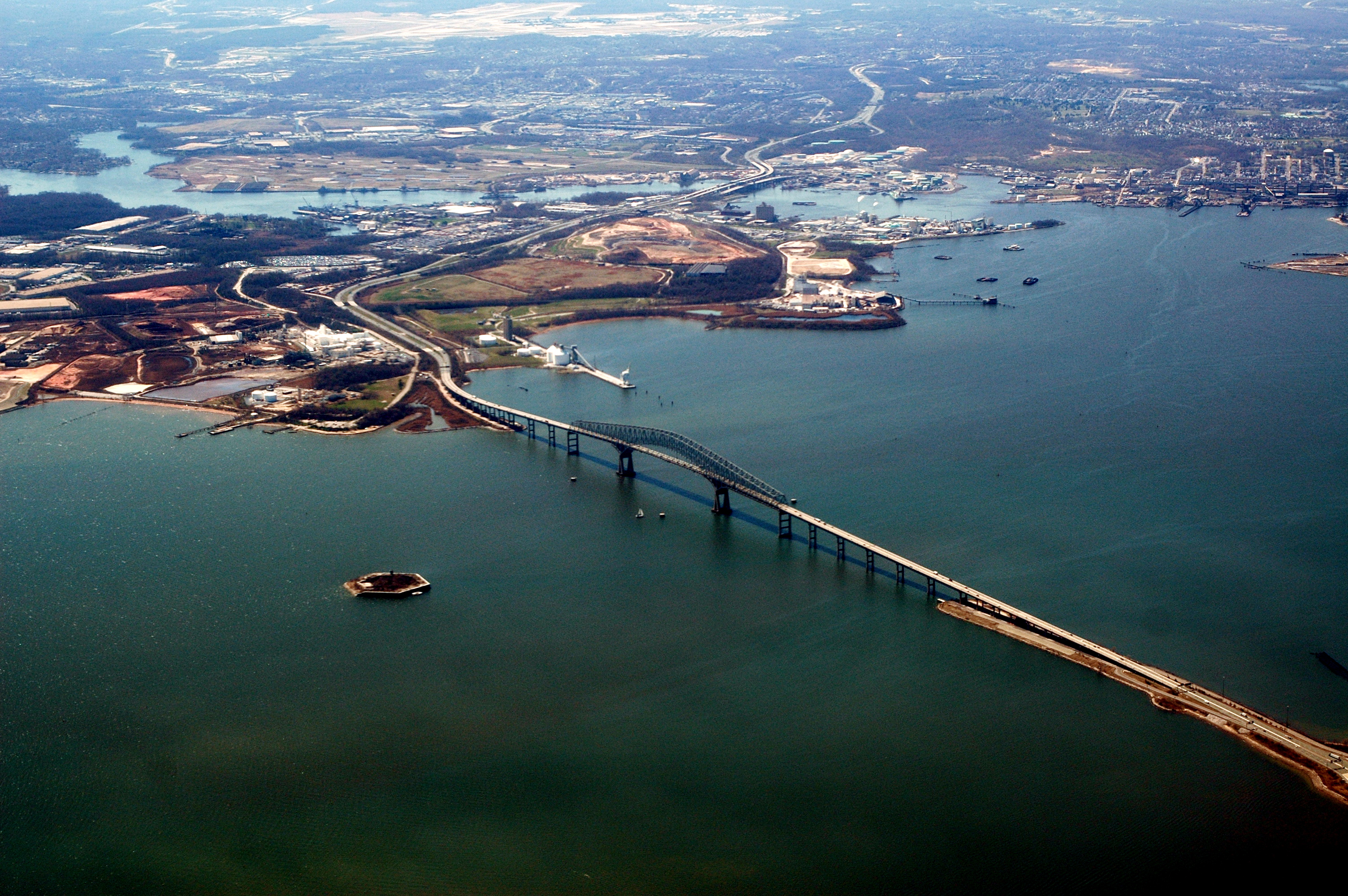
The Francis Scott Key Bridge, which carried I-695 over the Patapsco River, in 2007; it collapsed in 2024

Beyond this interchange, the route comes to a two-way all-electronic toll gantry with a U-turn ramp from the southbound to the northbound direction originally intended to provide southbound motorists access to MD 695A. This ramp, known as MD 695C, also provides access to northbound I-695 from MD 695A through Authority Drive, and after the 2024 collapse of the Francis Scott Key Bridge, is now the southbound (inner loop, clockwise) terminus of the highway.

Before the collapse, the route ascended onto the Francis Scott Key Bridge, which carried I-695 over the lower Baltimore Harbor and Patapsco River. Unlike the Fort McHenry or Baltimore Harbor tunnels, hazmat trucks were allowed to cross the Francis Scott Key Bridge. After crossing the Patapsco River over the bridge, the route touched down within the Baltimore city limits. It continues west past Thoms Cove through Hawkins Point's industrial areas. It comes to an interchange with Quarantine Road (where the route resumes after the collapsed bridge), which provides access to MD 173, south of Curtis Bay. By this point, the route's signage changes from north–south to east–west. Past this interchange, the Baltimore Beltway continues west and returns to the Curtis Creek drawbridges.

=== Exit numbering ===
As opposed to I-495 (Capital Beltway) around Washington, D.C., on which exit numbers are generally arranged by mileposts counterclockwise starting at the southern crossing of the Potomac River, the exit numbers for the Baltimore Beltway are arranged consecutively clockwise starting at interchange 1 at Quarantine Road, west of the Francis Scott Key Bridge crossing of the Patapsco River.

== History ==
=== 20th century ===
==== Initial construction ====
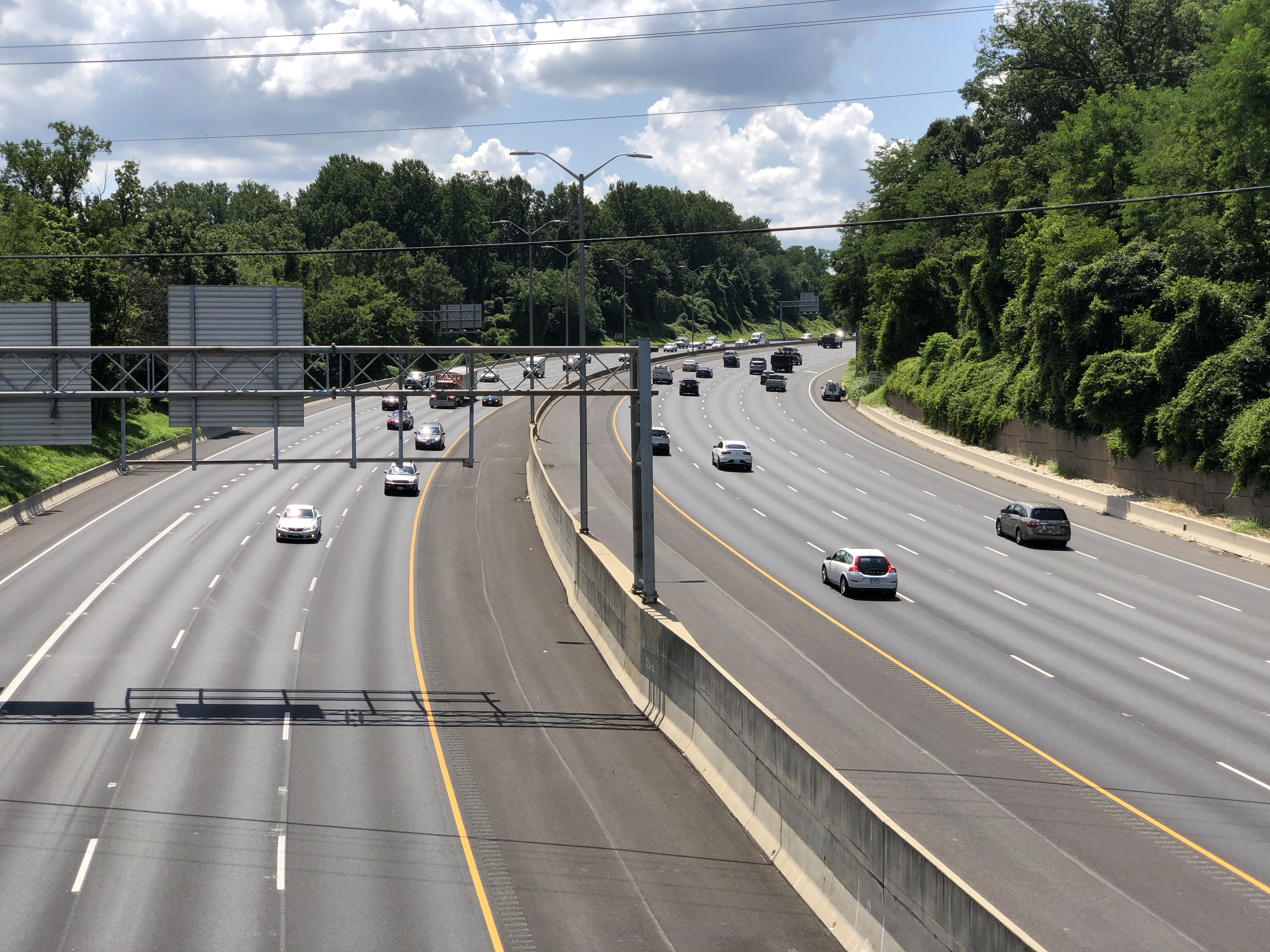
View southwest along I-695 from MD 25 in Pikesville

The Baltimore County Planning Commission first conceived the Baltimore Beltway as a county-level roadway project in 1949; by 1953, the state took over the project due to slow progress at the county level. The project was included as part of the Interstate Highway System by 1956, increasing the speed of construction due to federal funds available.

Maryland Route 695
- Location: Ferndale–Rossville
- Length: 19.37 mi (31.17 km)
- Existed: 1977–2024

The first part of the Baltimore Beltway was completed in December 1955 between MD 25 (Falls Road) and the Harrisburg Expressway (present-day I-83). In 1956, the next portion of the road between the Harrisburg Expressway and MD 45 (York Road) opened. Several more segments of the Baltimore Beltway would be built in the following years, with the section from MD 168 (Nursery Road) to the Glen Burnie Bypass (present-day I-97) opening in 1957; the portions from MD 45 to MD 542 (Loch Raven Boulevard), MD 7 (Old Philadelphia Road) to US 40 (Pulaski Highway), and from MD 168 to US 40 (Baltimore National Pike) opening in 1958; the segment from MD 2 (Ritchie Highway) to the Glen Burnie Bypass completed in 1960; the portion from US 1 (Belair Road) to MD 7 finished in 1961; and the portions from MD 542 to US 1 and from US 40 to MD 25 completed in 1962. At this time, the original length of the Baltimore Beltway, from MD 2 in the south clockwise to US 40 in the northeast, was fully completed and opened to traffic, providing the first Interstate-grade bypass of Baltimore and the first beltway in the US built under the Interstate Highway System. A segment of the road completed in 1973 ran from MD 10 to MD 2, heading toward the Outer Harbor Crossing.

==== Windlass and Patapsco freeways ====
From the junction with I-95, the Baltimore Beltway was planned to extend southeast along the Back River Neck peninsula, turning south to cross the Back River near the Essex Skypark airport, then heading towards the present Outer Harbor Crossing. Part of this alignment was completed as I-695 to the south of US 40 in 1972, then as MD 702 (Southeast Freeway), extending to MD 150 by 1975. However, the section of the Baltimore Beltway between south of MD 150 to west of the Back River crossing was not built, requiring it be rerouted on portions of two freeways not originally planned to be part of it.

The first was the Windlass Freeway (MD 149), a route planned to run from I-95 at Moravia Road northeast to Chase, paralleling US 40 to the south. The only portion of the Windlass Fwy constructed is the section of I-695 that diverges southwest from the directional T interchange with MD 702 to a point less than a mile (1.6 km) to the southwest where I-695 makes a sharp turn from west to south. From here, the Windlass Freeway would have continued to its southerly terminus at I-95. This sharp turn is half of what would have been another directional T interchange (which was to have become exit 37), marking the northern terminus of the Patapsco Freeway, the other freeway incorporated into the Baltimore Beltway.

The Patapsco Freeway was planned to connect the Windlass Freeway to the originally-planned Baltimore Beltway. Completed in 1973, the planned Patapsco Freeway is now part of I-695. The wide median in I-695 south of exit 41 (Cove Road) is where the unbuilt beltway would have intersected the Patapsco Freeway after crossing Back River to the east, making this the southern terminus of the Patapsco Freeway. Continuing southeast, I-695 rejoins the original alignment of the beltway.

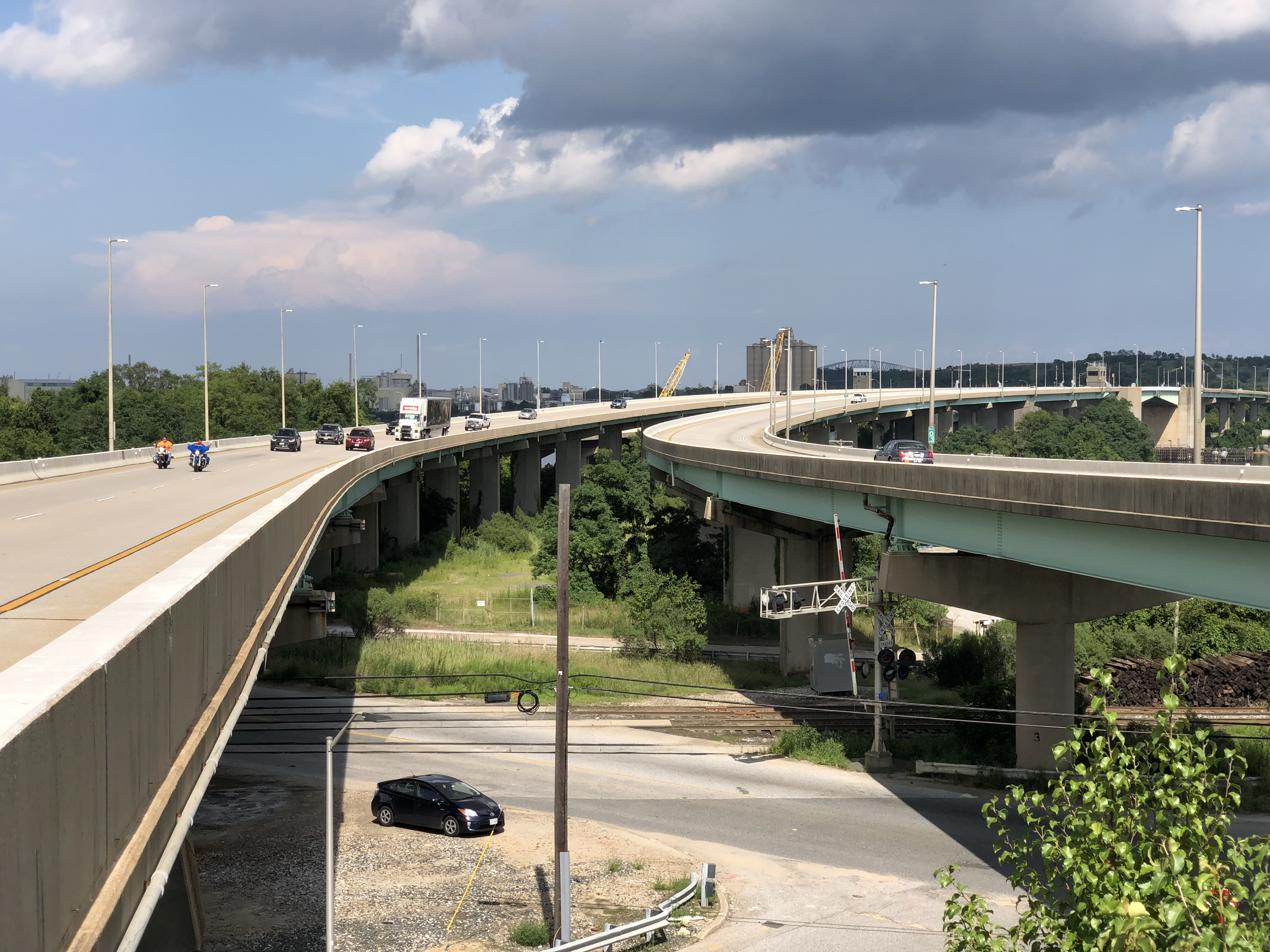
I-695 eastbound as it passes over MD 710 in Brooklyn Park

Ramp stubs for the planned Windlass Freeway are present at the proposed west end at I-95 and Moravia Road, and, at the present west end at the Southeast Freeway (MD 702), the partially built junction with the proposed Windlass Freeway. The planned junction of the Windlass and Patapsco freeways, now the point where I-695 makes a sharp turn from west to south, just to the north of where it crosses the Back River, was originally built with provisions for extending the Windlass Freeway to I-95, but this has since been reconfigured as a sharp curve on I-695.

==== Outer Harbor Crossing and further upgrades ====
The Outer Harbor Crossing is the name given to the segment of the Baltimore Beltway maintained by the MDTA. It consists of the segment of I-695 between exit 40 (MD 151) and exit 2 (MD 10), which included the Francis Scott Key Bridge. The route was originally planned as a two-lane freeway on a four-lane right-of-way, with a two-lane outer harbor tunnel across the Patapsco River. When the tunnel was advertised for construction in 1970, the bids were so high that the decision was made to construct a four-lane bridge instead. The bridge was to feature two-lane approach roads on both sides.

Construction on the Outer Harbor Crossing, including the bridge, started in 1972 and was opened on March 23, 1977, completing the full Baltimore Beltway. The bridge was named the Francis Scott Key Bridge in honor of Francis Scott Key, who wrote "The Star-Spangled Banner", the national anthem of the US. By the early 1980s, the southern approach to the Francis Scott Key Bridge was dualized, with a second roadway constructed along with a second drawbridge over Curtis Creek. The northern approach was left as a two-lane viaduct in the Sparrows Point area until a four-lane surface freeway was constructed along this portion, with interchanges reconfigured, following an $89.5-million (equivalent to $154 million in 2024) project completed in January 2000. The Outer Harbor Crossing, as well as the entire Baltimore Beltway east of I-95, was first signposted as MD 695 because portions of it were a two-lane expressway not up to Interstate Highway standards. Improvements to the road have allowed the entire Baltimore Beltway to be signed as I-695, even though all of I-695 between the junction of I-95 northeast of Baltimore and I-97 is officially considered MD 695 by MDSHA.

On June 8, 1999, a tractor-trailer carrying a backhoe that exceeded the maximum height requirement struck a pedestrian footbridge over the Baltimore Beltway just northwest of the I-95 junction near Arbutus. The footbridge collapsed onto the inner loop of the beltway. One driver was killed when his SUV struck the collapsed bridge; six others were injured, three critically. The incident occurred during the afternoon rush hour. The footbridge had been closed to pedestrians since November 1996 due to complaints about vandalism and crime.

=== 21st century ===
The beltway was dedicated in honor of former Governor Theodore McKeldin in May 2005. During his term, McKeldin was responsible for constructing the Beltway and other state highways. Most Marylanders still refer to the highway as the "Baltimore Beltway", "695", or (mainly among Baltimore metro area residents) simply "The Beltway", like its Washington, D.C. counterpart.

In March 2009, construction began on the reconstruction of the bridge that carries MD 139 (Charles Street) over I-695. The bridge is decorative, featuring ornamental street lights. As part of the MD 139 project, the interchange was reconstructed, and the traffic circle at the MD 139/I-695 ramps was removed and replaced with a traffic signal. This project cost $50 million (equivalent to $70.8 million in 2024) and was completed in 2012.

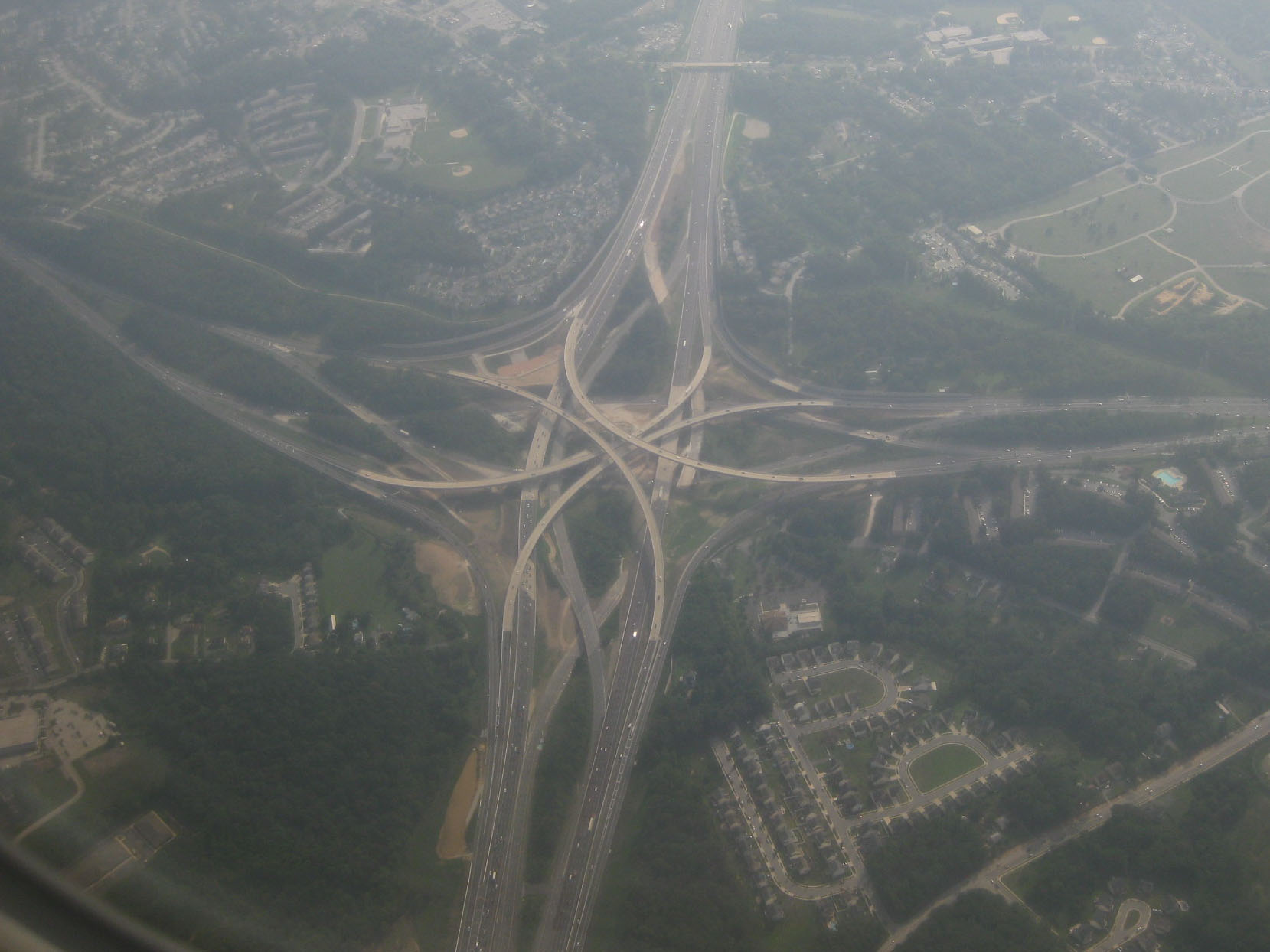
Aerial photo of exit 33 on August 16, 2010, showing completed flyover ramps, facing southwest.

At exit 33 (I-95/John F. Kennedy Memorial Highway), both highways had crossed over themselves so that through traffic was on the left side of the road with left-hand entrance/exit ramps connecting the crossover sections. This interchange was replaced in 2014 by a more conventional flyover ramp interchange as part of the I-95 expansion project under construction since 2007, eliminating the left-turn ramps and I-95's double crossovers. The ramp from northbound I-95 to eastbound I-695 was completed in September 2008, the ramp from westbound I-695 to northbound I-95 was completed in October 2008, the ramp from northbound I-95 to westbound I-695 was completed in November 2008 (eliminating the left-hand exit), and the ramp from eastbound I-695 to southbound I-95 was completed in May 2009. The ramps from southbound I-95 to both westbound and eastbound I-695 were completed in June 2009 and the ramp from westbound I-695 to southbound I-695 was completed in July 2009 and the ramp from eastbound I-695 to northbound I-95 opened in August 2009. In addition to rebuilding these ramps, the project also adds four ramps to service the HOT lanes being added to I-95.

In April 2024, the American Association of State Highway and Transportation Officials approved designating the MD 695 section of the beltway as I-695.

==== Francis Scott Key Bridge collapse ====
On March 26, 2024, the Francis Scott Key Bridge on I-695 collapsed after a ship collided with the bridge. The incident killed six construction workers and forced traffic to be rerouted to Interstate 895. Following the collapse, the section of I-695 between MD 157 (exit 43) and MD 173 (exit 1), including exit 44, was closed. The section will remain closed until the opening of the Francis Scott Key Bridge replacement, and in the meantime, I-695 de facto terminates at the route 695C turnaround ramp clockwise (inner loop) and MD 173 counter-clockwise (outer loop).

== Future ==
There are long-term plans to add new lanes to I-695 to ease traffic congestion along the northern and western parts of the route between the two interchanges with I-95. These plans would widen the sections between I-95 and I-70 on the west side and between the Jones Falls Expressway and I-95 on the north side. Work on the widening project began in 2020. In addition, there are plans to add a fourth lane between the ramps to I-795, ending the disappearing fourth lanes in this section. A multiyear project to replace the stack interchange at I-70/MD 570, under design as of 2022, would allow at least eight lanes to pass under this interchange. All these projects will enable up to 10 lanes to be constructed at a future date. Also, ramp meters will be installed at selected entrances. After the Key Bridge collapsed, President Joe Biden announced that the bridge would be rebuilt.

== Exit list ==
Exits are numbered sequentially (unlike other Interstates in Maryland which use a milepost-based system) and in a clockwise (inner loop) direction, in accordance with American Association of State Highway and Transportation Officials (AASHTO) guidelines.

County	Location	mi	km	Exit	Destinations	Notes
Baltimore City		50.13	80.68	1	MD 173 (Hawkins Point Road) / to Pennington Avenue / to Fort Smallwood Road	Outer loop (eastbound) terminus due to Key Bridge collapse; formerly last eastbound exit before toll
Curtis Creek		0.00	0.00	Curtis Creek Drawbridge		
Anne Arundel	Glen Burnie	0.76	1.22	2	MD 10 south (Arundel Expressway) – Severna Park	
Anne Arundel	Glen Burnie	0.76	1.22	Maintenance changes from MDTA to MDSHA		
Anne Arundel	Glen Burnie	1.67	2.69	3A	MD 2 north (Ritchie Highway) – Brooklyn	Eastbound access via MD 711
Anne Arundel	Glen Burnie	2.17	3.49	3B	MD 2 south (Ritchie Highway) – Glen Burnie	Eastbound access to MD 2 south via I-895B
Anne Arundel	Ferndale	2.48	3.99	4	I-97 south – Annapolis, Bay Bridge	
Anne Arundel	Linthicum	3.24	5.21	5	MD 648 (Baltimore-Annapolis Boulevard) – Ferndale	
Anne Arundel	Linthicum	3.72	5.99	6	MD 170 (Camp Meade Road) – Linthicum, North Linthicum	Eastbound exit and westbound entrance; signed as exits 6A (north) and 6B (south)
Anne Arundel	Linthicum	4.54	7.31	7	MD 295 (Baltimore–Washington Parkway) – Baltimore, Washington	Signed as exits 7A (north) and 7B (south)
Anne Arundel	Linthicum	4.92	7.92	8	MD 168 (Nursery Road) / Hammonds Ferry Road	Northbound access via MD 969A
Baltimore	Lansdowne	5.61	9.03	8A	I-895 north (Harbor Tunnel Thruway) – Baltimore Harbor Tunnel	Southbound exit and northbound entrance; I-895 exit 3
Baltimore	Lansdowne	5.84	9.40	9	Hollins Ferry Road – Lansdowne	Former MD 891
Baltimore	Arbutus	6.53	10.51	10	US 1 Alt. (Washington Boulevard) / Sulphur Spring Road	Southbound exit to US 1 Alt. splits from exit 11B to Sulphur Spring Road
Baltimore	Arbutus	6.99	11.25	11	I-95 – Baltimore, Washington	Signed as exits 11A (north) and 11B (south); I-95 exits 49A-B
Baltimore	Arbutus	7.76	12.49	12A	US 1 (Southwestern Boulevard) – Arbutus	Outer Loop exit and Inner Loop entrance; access to Halethorpe station and Leeds Avenue
Baltimore	Catonsville	8.72	14.03	12	MD 372 (Wilkens Avenue)	Signed as exits 12B (east) and 12C (west); access to UMBC Campus and CCBC Catonsville
Baltimore	Catonsville	9.96	16.03	13	MD 144 (Frederick Road) – Catonsville	
Baltimore	Catonsville	10.44	16.80	14	Edmondson Avenue	
Baltimore	Catonsville	11.19	18.01	15	US 40 (Baltimore National Pike) – Baltimore, Ellicott City	Signed as exits 15A (east) and 15B (west)
Baltimore	Woodlawn	12.60– 13.06	20.28– 21.02	16	I-70 west / MD 570 east – Frederick, Local Traffic	Signed as exits 16A (east) and 16B (west); I-70/MD 570 exits 91A-B
Baltimore	Woodlawn	12.60– 13.06	20.28– 21.02	17	MD 122 (Security Boulevard) – Woodlawn	
Baltimore	Lochearn	15.60	25.11	18	MD 26 (Liberty Road) – Lochearn, Randallstown	Signed as exits 18A (east) and 18B (west)
Baltimore	Pikesville	17.40	28.00	19	I-795 north (Northwest Expressway) – Owings Mills, Reisterstown	Southern terminus and exits 1A-B on I-795; tri-stack interchange
Baltimore	Pikesville	18.37	29.56	20	MD 140 (Reisterstown Road) – Pikesville, Garrison	Access to Old Court station
Baltimore	Pikesville	19.11– 19.60	30.75– 31.54	21	MD 129 (Park Heights Avenue) / Stevenson Road	The two halves of this interchange, at MD 129 and Stevenson Road, are connected by MD 129A
Baltimore	Pikesville	21.01	33.81	22	Greenspring Avenue	No trucks allowed in Baltimore City; access to Stevenson University
Baltimore	Brooklandville	22.74	36.60	23	I-83 south (Jones Falls Expressway) / MD 25 (Falls Road) – Baltimore	West end of concurrency with I-83; signed as exits 23A (I-83) and 25B (MD 25); access to MD 25 via MD 25A
Baltimore	Lutherville	24.26	39.04	24	I-83 north (Harrisburg Expressway) – Timonium, York, PA	East end of concurrency with I-83
Baltimore	Lutherville	24.88	40.04	25	MD 139 (Charles Street)	Access to Colleges (Towson University, Loyola University Maryland, Notre Dame of Maryland University, and Johns Hopkins University)
Baltimore	Towson	25.90	41.68	26	MD 45 (York Road) – Towson, Lutherville	Signed as exits 26A (south) and 26B (north) eastbound; eastbound access to MD 45 south via MD 45A
Baltimore	Towson	26.53	42.70	27	MD 146 (Dulaney Valley Road) – Towson	Signed as exits 27A (south) and 27B (north)
Baltimore	Towson	27.78	44.71	28	Providence Road	
Baltimore	Towson	28.52	45.90	29A	Cromwell Bridge Road	Former MD 567
Baltimore	Towson	28.69	46.17	29B	MD 542 south (Loch Raven Boulevard)	Exits 29A and 29B are combined on outer loop
Baltimore	Parkville	29.75	47.88	30	MD 41 (Perring Parkway)	Signed as exits 30A (south) and 30B (north)
Baltimore	Carney	30.89	49.71	31	MD 147 (Harford Road) – Parkville, Carney	Signed as exits 31A (south) and 31B (north)
Baltimore	Overlea	31.35	50.45	31C	MD 43 east (White Marsh Boulevard) – White Marsh	Eastbound exit and westbound entrance
Baltimore	Overlea	32.52	52.34	32	US 1 (Belair Road) – Overlea, Bel Air	Signed as exits 32A (south) and 32B (north)
Baltimore	Rossville	34.07	54.83	33	I-95 (John F. Kennedy Memorial Highway) – Baltimore, New York	Signed as exits 33A (south) and 33B (north); I-95 exits 64A-B
Baltimore	Rosedale	35.26	56.75	34	MD 7 (Philadelphia Road) – Rosedale	
Baltimore	Rosedale	35.60	57.29	35	US 40 (Pulaski Highway) – Baltimore, Aberdeen	Signed as exits 35A (west) and 35B (east)
Baltimore	Essex	35.95	57.86	36	MD 702 south (Southeast Boulevard) – Essex	
Baltimore	Dundalk	38.73	62.33	38	MD 150 (Eastern Boulevard) – Baltimore, Essex	Signed as exits 38A (west) and 38B (east) southbound; no northbound access to MD 150 west
Baltimore	Dundalk	39.09	62.91	39	MD 157 south (Merritt Boulevard) – Dundalk	Southbound exit and northbound entrance
Baltimore	Dundalk	39.35	63.33	40	MD 151 north (North Point Boulevard) to MD 150 west (Eastern Boulevard) – Baltimore	Northbound exit and southbound entrance
Baltimore	Dundalk	40.05	64.45	40	MD 151 south (North Point Boulevard)	Southbound exit and northbound entrance
Baltimore	Dundalk	41.08	66.11	41	Cove Road to MD 151 – Dundalk	
Baltimore	Dundalk	43.56	70.10	42	MD 151 (North Point Boulevard) – Sparrows Point	Southbound exit and northbound entrance
Baltimore	Dundalk	43.81	70.51	Maintenance changes from MDSHA to MDTA at the former east end of the bridge over a CSX Transportation line		
Baltimore	Dundalk	44.74	72.00	43	MD 157 (Peninsula Expressway) / MD 158 (Bethlehem Boulevard)	Formerly last southbound exit before toll
Baltimore	Dundalk	46.51	74.85	44	Broening Highway (MD 695A)	Northbound exit and southbound entrance
Baltimore	Dundalk	46.92	75.51	Key Bridge toll plaza (E-ZPass or Video Tolling; suspended)		
Baltimore	Dundalk	47.36	76.22		I-695 north – Dundalk Marine Terminal, Seagirt Marine Terminal	U-turn ramp (MD 695C) connecting I-695 south to I-695 north; inner loop (southbound) terminus due to Key Bridge collapse.
Patapsco River		48.23	77.62	Key Bridge (collapsed)		
1.000 mi = 1.609 km; 1.000 km = 0.621 mi: Closed/former; Concurrency terminus; Incomplete access

== Auxiliary routes ==
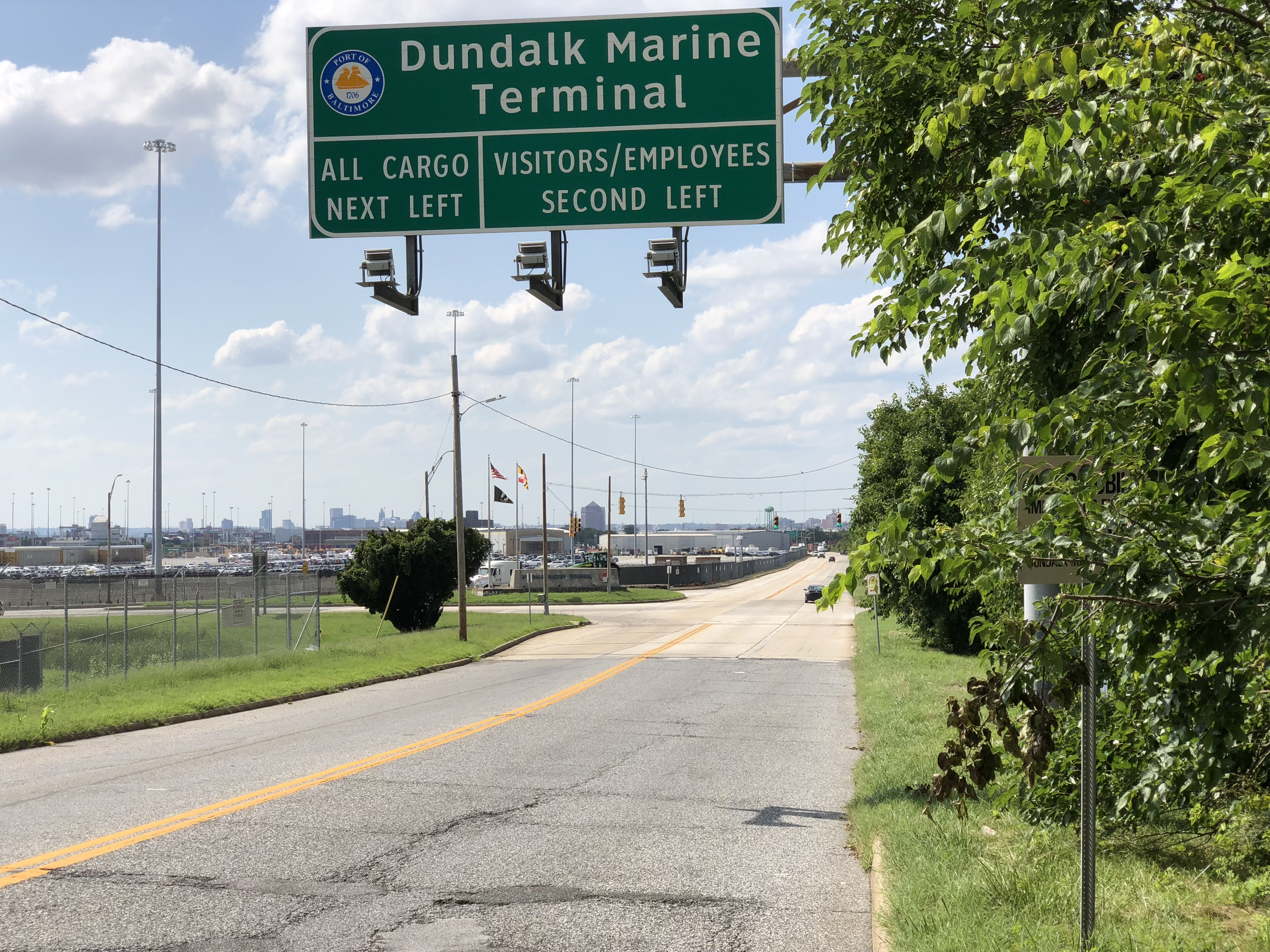
MD 695A approaching the entrance to the Dundalk Marine Terminal

- Maryland Route 695A (MD 695A) runs along Broening Highway, a two-lane undivided road that begins at I-695 exit 44 and heads northwest through residential and industrial areas in Dundalk, Baltimore County, to the Baltimore city line. The route provides access to the Dundalk Marine Terminal from I-695. MD 695A is 1.93 miles (3.11 km) long.
- Maryland Route 695B (MD 695B) runs along Belclare Road from MD 695A north to Dundalk Avenue in Dundalk, Baltimore County. The route is 0.1 miles (0.16 km) long.
- Maryland Route 695C (MD 695C) runs along Authority Drive from MD 695A southwest to I-695 in Dundalk, Baltimore County, looping under the route at the Francis Scott Key Bridge to merge onto northbound I-695. MD 695C serves as part of a U-turn ramp to provide access to MD 695A from southbound I-695 and to provide access to northbound I-695 from MD 695A. The route is 1.23 miles (1.98 km) long.
