= Dundalk, Maryland =

Unincorporated community in Maryland, United States

Dundalk
- Census-designated place
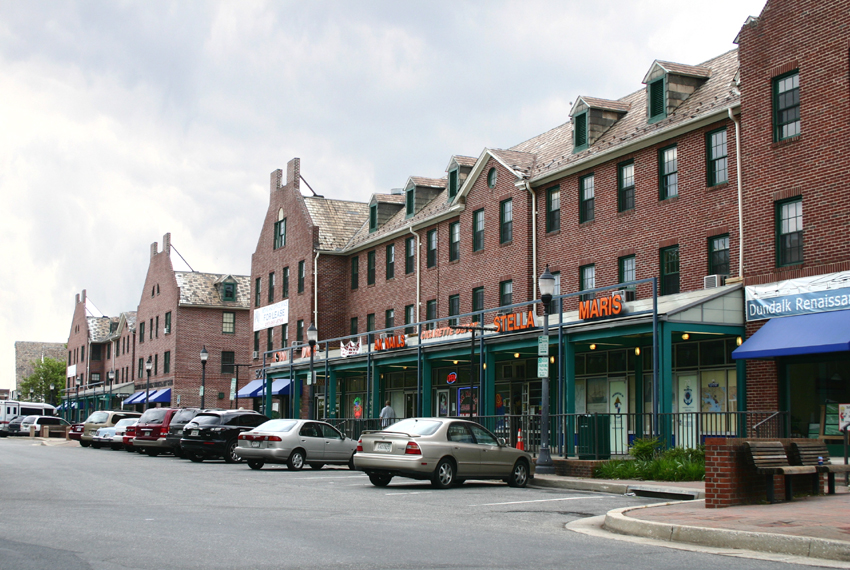
- The Dundalk Shopping Center, in May 2006

- Flag

- Location in the U.S. state of Maryland
- Coordinates: 39°15′57″N 76°30′19″W
- Country: United States
- State: Maryland
- County: Baltimore
- Founded: 1856

Area
  - Total: 17.41 sq mi (45.10 km^{2})
  - Land: 13.09 sq mi (33.90 km^{2})
  - Water: 4.32 sq mi (11.20 km^{2})
- Elevation: 16 ft (5 m)

Population (2020)
  - Total: 67,796
  - Density: 5,180.2/sq mi (2,000.08/km^{2})
- Time zone: UTC-5 (EST)
  - Summer (DST): UTC-4 (EDT)
- ZIP code: 21222
- Area codes: 410, 443, 667
- FIPS code: 24-23975
- GNIS feature ID: 0590117

Dundalk (/ˈdʌndɔːk/ DUN-dawk or /ˈdʌndɒk/ DUN-dok) is an unincorporated community and census-designated place in Baltimore County, Maryland, United States. The population was 67,796 at the 2020 census. In 1960 and 1970, Dundalk was the largest unincorporated community in Maryland. It was named after the town of Dundalk in County Louth, Ireland. Dundalk is considered one of the first inner-ring suburbs of Baltimore.

== History ==
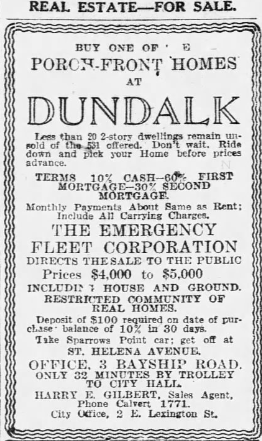
A 1920 advertisement in the Baltimore Sun for racially restricted houses in Dundalk sold by Harry E. Gilbert.

The area now known as Dundalk was explored by John Smith in 1608. Up until this time, the area was home to the tribes of the Susquehanna.

In 1856, Henry McShane, an immigrant from Ireland, established the McShane Bell Foundry on the banks of the Patapsco River in the then far southeastern outskirts of Baltimore. The foundry later relocated to the Patterson Park area of Baltimore until a fire during the 1940s caused it to move to 201 East Federal Street. In addition to bronze bells, the foundry once manufactured cast iron pipes and furnace fittings. When asked by the Baltimore and Sparrows Point Railroad for the name of a depot for the foundry on their rail line, McShane wrote Dundalk, after the town of his birth, Dundalk, in County Louth, Ireland. In 1977, the foundry moved to Glen Burnie and relocated to its current headquarters in St Louis, Missouri in 2019.

In 1916, the Bethlehem Steel purchased 1,000 acres (4.0 km^{2}) of farmland near the McShane foundry to develop housing for its shipyard workers. The Dundalk Company was formed to plan a town in the new style, similar to that of the Roland Park area of Baltimore, excluding businesses except at specific spots and leaving land for future development of schools, playing fields, and parks. By 1917, Dundalk proper was founded, at which point it had 62 houses, two stores, a post office, and a telephone exchange. Streets were laid out in a pedestrian-friendly open grid, with monikers like "Shipway", "Northship", "Flagship", and "Admiral". The two-story houses had steeply pitched roofs and stucco exteriors. As steel demand increased rapidly during World War I, white workers streamed into Dundalk, pushing black workers into a small community nearby named Turner Station. Turner Station expanded even more during World War II as steel demand increased.

Dundalk was once known as a "Little Appalachia" or a "hillbilly ghetto." Before, during, and after World War II, many Appalachian migrants settled in the Baltimore area, including Dundalk. Appalachian people who migrated to Dundalk were largely economic migrants who came looking for work.

Prior to the passage of the Fair Housing Act of 1968, racial covenants were used in Maryland to exclude African-Americans and other minorities. A 1920 advertisement in the Baltimore Sun advertised houses in Dundalk as racially "restricted".

The Dundalk Historic District was listed on the National Register of Historic Places in 1983.

== Geography ==
According to the United States Census Bureau, the CDP has a total area of 17.4 square miles (45.0 km^{2}), of which 13.1 square miles (33.8 km^{2}) is land and 4.3 square miles (11.2 km^{2}), or 24.84%, is water.

Most of Dundalk is flat and very near sea level, with a few small hills close to the city of Baltimore to the west. Dundalk is part of the Atlantic Coastal Plain. Elevations range from sea level on the shore of the Chesapeake Bay to approximately 40 feet (12 m) above sea level along the northern reaches of Dundalk Avenue and North Point Boulevard.

Bread and Cheese Creek is a tributary of the Back River in Dundalk. The creek is 8.5 miles (13.7 km) long, with headwaters in Baltimore City. It flows through Dundalk before emptying into the Back River, which flows into the Chesapeake Bay. The watershed area of the creek is 1.85 square miles (4.8 km^{2}).

== Demographics ==
Historical population
Census	Pop.	Note	%±
1960	82,248		—
1970	85,377		3.8%
1980	71,293		−16.5%
1990	65,800		−7.7%
2000	62,306		−5.3%
2010	63,597		2.1%
2020	67,796		6.6%

=== Racial and ethnic composition ===
Dundalk CDP, Maryland – Racial and ethnic composition Note: the US Census treats Hispanic/Latino as an ethnic category. This table excludes Latinos from the racial categories and assigns them to a separate category. Hispanics/Latinos may be of any race.
Race / Ethnicity (NH = Non-Hispanic)	Pop 2000	Pop 2010	Pop 2020	% 2000	% 2010	% 2020
White alone (NH)	55,297	50,347	42,558	88.75%	79.17%	62.77%
Black or African American alone (NH)	4,649	6,835	9,523	7.46%	10.75%	14.05%
Native American or Alaska Native alone (NH)	336	519	473	0.54%	0.82%	0.70%
Asian alone (NH)	445	1,058	1,371	0.71%	1.66%	2.02%
Native Hawaiian or Pacific Islander alone (NH)	14	11	18	0.02%	0.02%	0.03%
Other race alone (NH)	38	47	296	0.06%	0.07%	0.44%
Mixed race or Multiracial (NH)	623	1,622	3,912	1.00%	2.55%	5.77%
Hispanic or Latino (any race)	904	3,158	9,645	1.45%	4.97%	14.23%
Total	62,306	63,597	67,796	100.00%	100.00%	100.00%

=== 2020 census ===
As of the 2020 census, Dundalk had a population of 67,796. The median age was 37.1 years. 24.0% of residents were under the age of 18 and 15.4% of residents were 65 years of age or older. For every 100 females there were 92.9 males, and for every 100 females age 18 and over there were 90.1 males age 18 and over.

100.0% of residents lived in urban areas, while 0.0% lived in rural areas.

There were 25,313 households in Dundalk, of which 33.2% had children under the age of 18 living in them. Of all households, 36.9% were married-couple households, 20.4% were households with a male householder and no spouse or partner present, and 33.1% were households with a female householder and no spouse or partner present. About 27.1% of all households were made up of individuals and 12.2% had someone living alone who was 65 years of age or older.

There were 27,319 housing units, of which 7.3% were vacant. The homeowner vacancy rate was 1.4% and the rental vacancy rate was 8.1%.

Racial composition as of the 2020 census
Race	Number	Percent
White	43,719	64.5%
Black or African American	9,763	14.4%
American Indian and Alaska Native	764	1.1%
Asian	1,387	2.0%
Native Hawaiian and Other Pacific Islander	28	0.0%
Some other race	6,226	9.2%
Two or more races	5,909	8.7%
Hispanic or Latino (of any race)	9,645	14.2%

=== 2010 census ===
As of the census of 2010, there were 63,597 people. The racial makeup of Dundalk was 79.2% white, 11.0% African American, 5.0% Hispanic, 1.7% Asian, and 3.1% all other.

There were 24,772 households, out of which 29.2% had children under the age of 18 living with them, 46.5% were married couples living together, 16.1% had a female householder with no husband present, and 31.5% were non-families. 26.4% of all households were made up of individuals, and 13.0% had someone living alone who was 65 years of age or older. The average household size was 2.50 and the average family size was 2.98.

In the CDP, the population was spread out, with 23.9% under the age of 18, 7.4% from 18 to 24, 28.4% from 25 to 44, 22.6% from 45 to 64, and 17.7% who were 65 years of age or older. The median age was 39 years. For every 100 females, there were 91.3 males. For every 100 females age 18 and over, there were 87.4 males.

The median income for a household in the CDP was $39,789, and the median income for a family was $46,035. Males had a median income of $36,512 versus $25,964 for females. The per capita income for the CDP was $18,543. About 6.6% of families and 9.2% of the population were below the poverty line, including 13.3% of those under age 18 and 6.9% of those age 65 or over.

== Transportation ==
=== Roads ===
Interstate 695, the Baltimore Beltway, passes through the district, crossing the Patapsco River on the Francis Scott Key Bridge until its collapse in March 2024.

Some of the other major roads in the Dundalk area are:

- Dundalk Avenue
- Eastern Avenue
- Holabird Avenue
- Merritt Boulevard
- North Point Boulevard
- Sollers Point Road
- Wise Avenue

=== Public transit ===
Public transportation between Sparrows Point, Dundalk, and Baltimore City was operated by the United Railways and Electric Company's (later the Baltimore Transit Company) #26 streetcar line which ran down the middle of Dundalk Avenue until August 1958. Until the early 1950s, the line carried the famous "Red Rocket" streetcars, two and three-car trains of wooden trolleys. During World War II's rush hours on the line, trains operated on a 30-second headway.

Between 1940 and 1972, bus service in the Dundalk area was provided by Dundalk Bus Lines.

Today, public transportation is provided by the Maryland Transit Administration. MTA lines that serve the area are CityLink Blue, CityLink Navy, CityLink Orange, LocalLink 59, LocalLink 62, LocalLink 63, Express BusLink 163, and LocalLink 65.

== Education ==
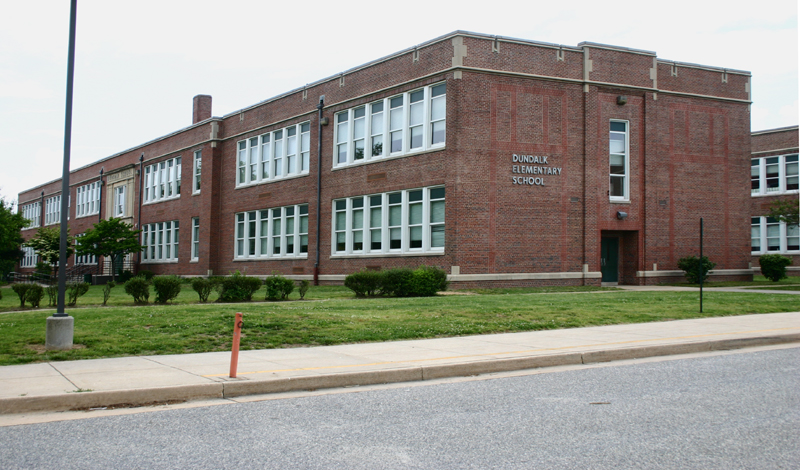
Dundalk Elementary School

Dundalk contains a campus of the Community College of Baltimore County, known as CCBC-Dundalk. It was formerly known as Dundalk Community College.

Dundalk is served by the Baltimore County Public Schools system for primary and secondary education, with Dundalk High School, Patapsco High School, and Sparrows Point High School being the major high schools in the area. Dundalk is also home to Sollers Point Technical High School, one of the few high schools in the country to hold an ISO 9001 certification.

== Emergency services ==
The Baltimore County Police Department, Dundalk (Precinct 12), is located at 428 Westham Way and has jurisdiction over the town.

Multiple fire stations serve the Dundalk area:

- Dundalk Station 6
- Eastview Station 15
- Edgemere Station 9
- Sparrows Point Station 57
- North Point-Edgemere Vol. Station 26
- Wise Avenue Vol. Station 27

== Notable people ==
- "Nasty" Nestor Aparicio, sports writer and radio talk show host, radio station owner
- Joshua Barney, United States Navy commodore during the Revolutionary War and the War of 1812
- Nasire Best, perpetrator in the May 2026 White House shooting
- Mike Bielecki, former Major League Baseball pitcher
- Kevin Clash, native and resident of Dundalk's Turner Station neighborhood; performs Elmo and other Muppet characters
- Robert Curbeam, native of Turner Station neighborhood, NASA astronaut
- Ron Franklin, jockey who won the Kentucky Derby and Preakness Stakes aboard Spectacular Bid in 1979
- Rudy Gay, resident of Turner Station neighborhood; NBA player, former UConn and Archbishop Spalding star
- Wild Bill Hagy, notable Baltimore Orioles fan
- Calvin Hill, resident of Turner Station neighborhood; NFL running back, father of NBA star Grant Hill
- Jim Jagielski, open-source founder and software engineer
- Dave Johnson, former Major League Baseball pitcher
- Henrietta Lacks, resident of Turner Station neighborhood; source of the HeLa cell line
- Bucky Lasek, professional skateboarder and race car driver
- Tom Maxwell, guitarist/songwriter for rock band Hellyeah
- Douglas Purviance, Turner Station native, Grammy-winning jazz trombonist
- Gina Schock, drummer for The Go-Go's
- Scott Seiss, comedian, actor and TikToker
- Tony Sweet, nature photographer, jazz musician
- John Thanos, spree killer
- Jessica Williams, jazz pianist.
- Danny Wiseman, professional bowler with 12 PBA titles, including the 2004 USBC Masters
- Bernie Wrightson, illustrator known for his horror illustrations and comic books

== See also ==
- The Dundalk Eagle newspaper

== Bibliography ==
- Neidt, C. (2006). "Gentrification and grassroots: Popular support in the revanchist suburb". Journal of Urban Affairs, Vol. 28, No. 2, 99–120.
- Reutter, M. (2004). Making Steel: Sparrows Point and the Rise and Ruin of American Industrial Might. Urbana and Chicago: University of Illinois Press.
- Rudacille, Deborah (2010). Roots of Steel: Boom and Bust in an American Mill Town. Pantheon. ISBN 978-0-375-42368-0
- Vicino, Thomas, J. (2008). Transforming Race and Class in Suburbia: Decline in Metropolitan Baltimore. New York: Palgrave Macmillan.
