= Edgemere, Maryland =

- Census-designated place
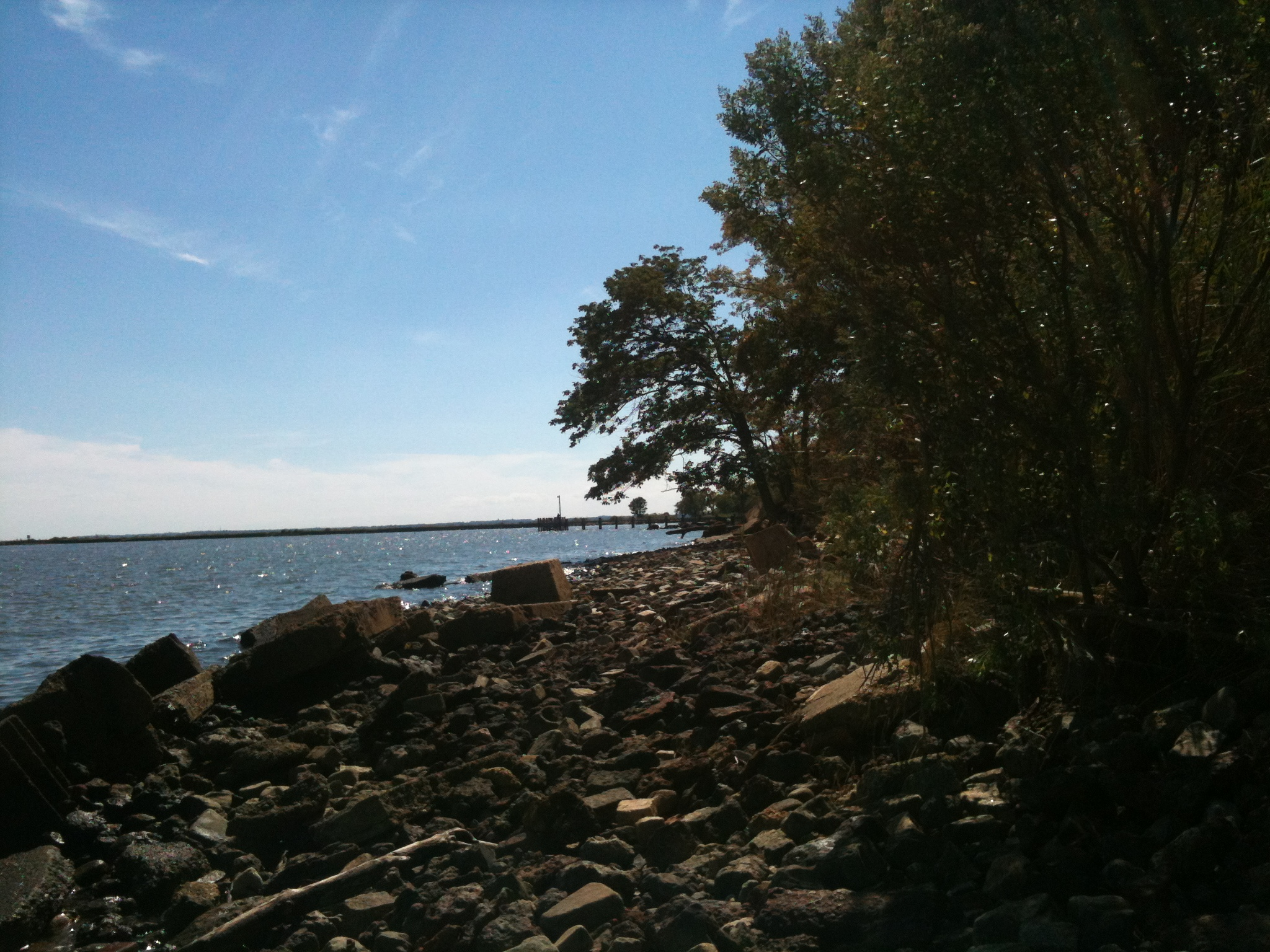
- Waterfront scene in Edgemere

- Flag

- Location of Edgemere, Maryland
- Coordinates: 39°13′45″N 76°26′56″W
- Country: United States
- State: Maryland
- County: Baltimore

Area
  - Total: 20.57 sq mi (53.28 km^{2})
  - Land: 10.86 sq mi (28.14 km^{2})
  - Water: 9.71 sq mi (25.14 km^{2})
- Elevation: 20 ft (6 m)

Population (2020)
  - Total: 9,069
  - Density: 834.7/sq mi (322.27/km^{2})
- Time zone: UTC−5 (Eastern (EST))
  - Summer (DST): UTC−4 (EDT)
- FIPS code: 24-24950
- GNIS feature ID: 0590133

Edgemere is an unincorporated community and census-designated place in Baltimore County, Maryland, United States. The population was 8,669 at the 2010 census. Founded in 1899 as Edgemere being renamed from previous name "Fitzell". Meeting held at the Fitzell Farm which was situated where the old Rheem plant was located (later it became the record storage facility for Bethlehem Steel plant at Sparrows Point).

== Geography ==
Edgemere is located at 39°13′45″N 76°26′56″W (39.229258, −76.448981).

According to the United States Census Bureau, the CDP has a total area of 20.6 square miles (53 km^{2}), of which 10.8 square miles (28 km^{2}) is land and 9.8 square miles (25 km^{2}), or 47.47%, is water.

== Demographics ==
Historical population
Census	Pop.	Note	%±
1960	11,775		—
1970	10,352		−12.1%
1980	9,078		−12.3%
1990	9,226		1.6%
2000	9,248		0.2%
2010	8,669		−6.3%
2020	9,069		4.6%
U.S. Decennial Census

=== Racial and ethnic composition ===
Edgmere CDP, Maryland – Racial and ethnic composition Note: the US Census treats Hispanic/Latino as an ethnic category. This table excludes Latinos from the racial categories and assigns them to a separate category. Hispanics/Latinos may be of any race.
Race / Ethnicity (NH = Non-Hispanic)	Pop 2000	Pop 2010	Pop 2020	% 2000	% 2010	% 2020
White alone (NH)	8,589	8,041	7,930	92.87%	92.76%	87.44%
Black or African American alone (NH)	480	342	368	5.19%	3.95%	4.06%
Native American or Alaska Native alone (NH)	16	38	24	0.17%	0.44%	0.26%
Asian alone (NH)	29	37	55	0.31%	0.43%	0.61%
Native Hawaiian or Pacific Islander alone (NH)	17	0	2	0.18%	0.00%	0.02%
Other race alone (NH)	3	2	27	0.03%	0.02%	0.30%
Mixed race or Multiracial (NH)	53	96	418	0.57%	1.11%	4.61%
Hispanic or Latino (any race)	61	113	245	0.66%	1.30%	2.70%
Total	9,248	8,669	9,069	100.00%	100.00%	100.00%

=== 2020 census ===
As of the 2020 census, Edgemere had a population of 9,069. The median age was 44.9 years. 19.5% of residents were under the age of 18 and 20.5% of residents were 65 years of age or older. For every 100 females there were 98.4 males, and for every 100 females age 18 and over there were 95.8 males age 18 and over.

97.4% of residents lived in urban areas, while 2.6% lived in rural areas.

There were 3,610 households in Edgemere, of which 27.3% had children under the age of 18 living in them. Of all households, 48.1% were married-couple households, 18.5% were households with a male householder and no spouse or partner present, and 25.7% were households with a female householder and no spouse or partner present. About 26.3% of all households were made up of individuals and 14.8% had someone living alone who was 65 years of age or older.

There were 3,962 housing units, of which 8.9% were vacant. The homeowner vacancy rate was 3.1% and the rental vacancy rate was 5.7%.

=== 2000 census ===
At the 2000 census there were 9,249 people, 3,529 households, and 2,513 families living in the CDP. The population density was 855.6 inhabitants per square mile (330.3/km^{2}). There were 3,764 housing units at an average density of 348.2 per square mile (134.4/km^{2}). The racial makeup of the CDP was 93.43% White, 5.19% African American, 0.18% Native American, 0.31% Asian, 0.18% Pacific Islander, 0.09% from other races, and 0.62% from two or more races. Hispanic or Latino of any race were 0.66%.

Of the 3,530 households 28.2% had children under the age of 18 living with them, 55.9% were married couples living together, 10.1% had a female householder with no husband present, and 28.8% were non-families. 24.0% of households were one person and 12.3% were one person aged 65 or older. The average household size was 2.58 and the average family size was 3.04.

The age distribution was 22.1% under the age of 18, 7.2% from 18 to 24, 26.9% from 25 to 44, 27.1% from 45 to 64, and 16.7% 65 or older. The median age was 41 years. For every 100 females, there were 98.1 males. For every 100 females age 18 and over, there were 98.3 males.

The median household income was $46,928 and the median family income was $55,662. Males had a median income of $40,577 versus $28,398 for females. The per capita income for the CDP was $20,802. About 5.4% of families and 7.0% of the population were below the poverty line, including 9.0% of those under age 18 and 8.6% of those age 65 or over.
