= Maryland Route 700 =

State highway in Maryland, United States

Maryland Route 700
- Martin Boulevard
- Maryland Route 700 highlighted in red

Route information
- Maintained by MDSHA
- Length: 1.97 mi (3.17 km)
- Existed: 1941–present

Major junctions
- South end: MD 150 in Middle River
- North end: US 40 in Rossville

Location
- Country: United States
- State: Maryland
- Counties: Baltimore

Highway system
- Maryland highway system; Interstate; US; State; Scenic Byways
← I-695	→ MD 701

Maryland Route 700 (MD 700) is a state highway in the U.S. state of Maryland. Known as Martin Boulevard, the state highway runs 1.97 miles (3.17 km) from MD 150 in Middle River north to U.S. Route 40 (US 40) in Rossville. MD 700 was constructed as a defense access road in 1941 to improve access to the aircraft manufacturing plant of the Glenn L. Martin Company, one of the predecessor companies of the site's present owner, Lockheed Martin.

== Route description ==
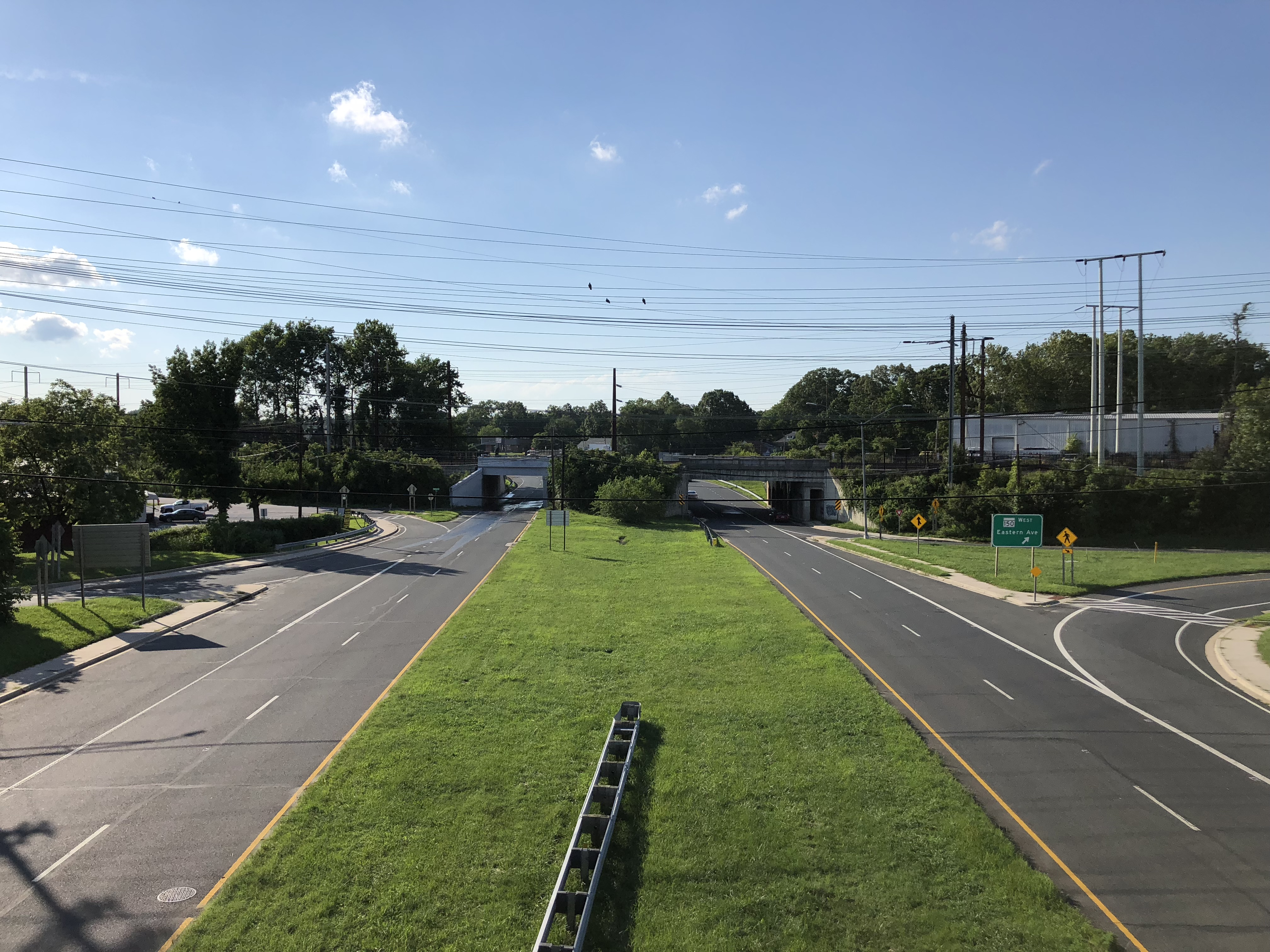
MD 700 northbound at MD 150 in Middle River

MD 700 begins at a cloverleaf interchange with MD 150 (Eastern Boulevard) in Middle River. The four-lane divided highway continues south as Chesapeake Park Place, which leads into Lockheed Martin's Middle River Complex, a facility of the company's Mission Systems & Sensors business segment. After the southbound direction has a right-in/right-out interchange with Old Eastern Avenue, MD 700 passes under Amtrak's Northeast Corridor railroad line and MARC's Penn Line. The state highway veers west and intersects Riverton Road and Middle River Road and passes Martin Plaza Shopping Center. MD 700 gently curves to the northwest and crosses Compass Road and Kelso Drive before reaching its northern terminus at a modified trumpet interchange with US 40 (Pulaski Highway).

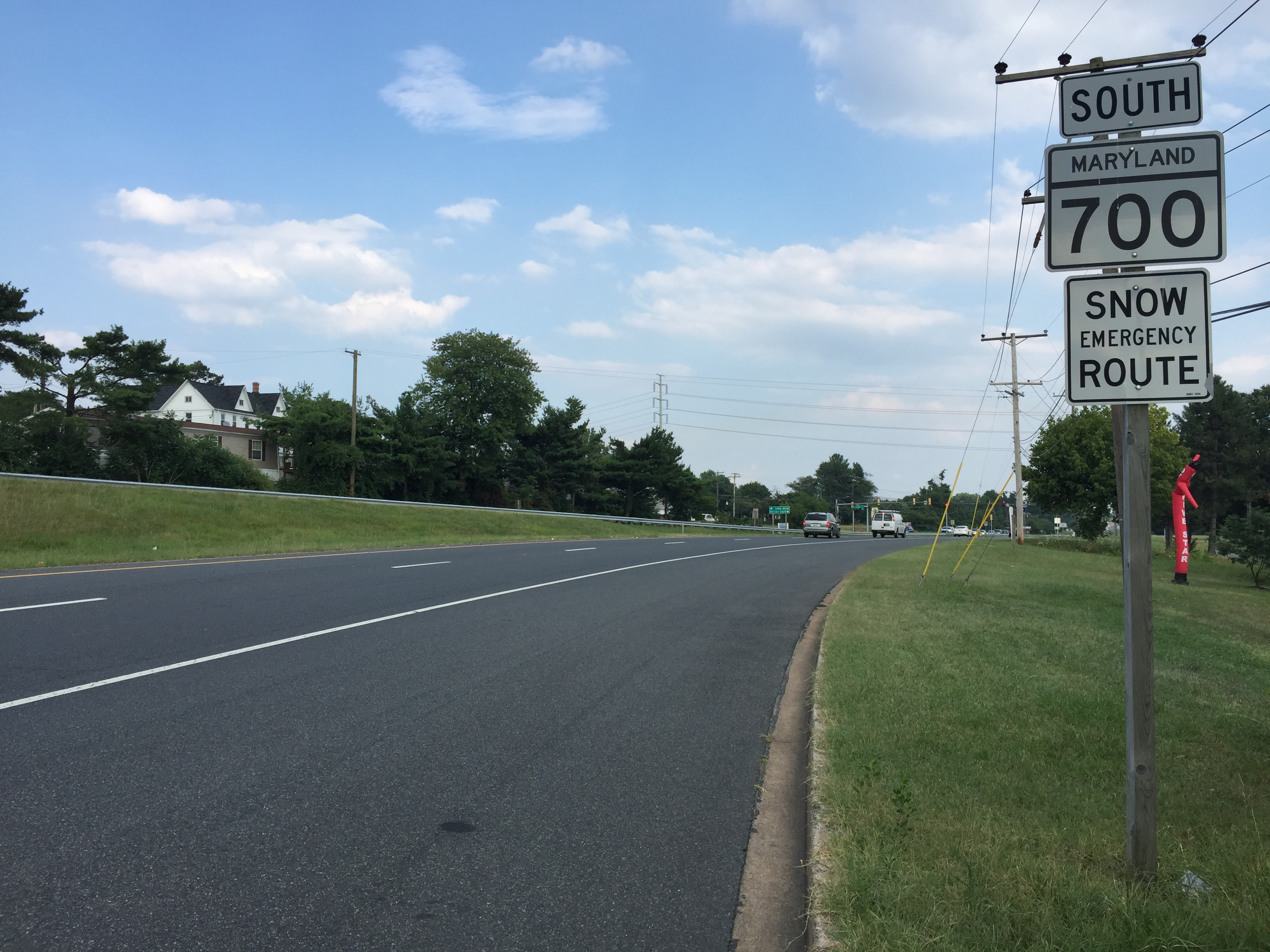
View south from the north end of MD 700 at US 40 in Rossville

== History ==
The predecessor highway to MD 700 was MD 493, which was a state-maintained portion of Orems Road constructed around 1933. MD 493 began at a creek crossing due south of Martin Plaza Shopping Plaza, headed east along Orems Road and present-day Old Orems Road to an at-grade railroad crossing of the Pennsylvania Railroad, then continued east on present-day Baker Avenue to Eastern Avenue just west of the Baker Avenue right-in/right-out junction with MD 700. Prior to construction of MD 700, the only highway connection to the Glenn L. Martin Company aircraft manufacturing plant in Middle River, which was established in 1929, was MD 150. However, upcoming war conditions as a result of World War II required improved connections to military reservations and manufacturers critical to the war effort. A four-lane divided highway with interchanges at US 40 and MD 150 and an underpass of what was then the Pennsylvania Railroad was included in a list of access roads prepared by the Maryland State Roads Commission for the United States Department of War in 1940. MD 700 was constructed in 1941 before federal funding specifically for defense access roads was authorized by the Defense Highway Act of 1941. The state highway, which has only seen minor improvements since 1941, was designated MD 700 by 1946. MD 493 was removed from the state highway system by 1946 and the at-grade railroad crossing was gone by 1949.

== Junction list ==
The entire route is in Baltimore County.

Location	mi	km	Destinations	Notes
Middle River	0.00	0.00	MD 150 (Eastern Boulevard) / Chesapeake Park Place south – Essex, Chase	Partial cloverleaf interchange; southern terminus
Rossville	1.97	3.17	US 40 (Pulaski Highway) – Baltimore, Aberdeen	Modified trumpet interchange; northern terminus
1.000 mi = 1.609 km; 1.000 km = 0.621 mi
