= Maryland Route 587 =

State highway in Maryland, United States

Maryland Route 587
- Wilson Point Road

Route information
- Maintained by MDSHA
- Length: 1.14 mi (1.83 km)
- Existed: 1934–present

Major junctions
- South end: Dogwood Drive in Middle River
- North end: MD 150 in Middle River

Location
- Country: United States
- State: Maryland
- Counties: Baltimore

Highway system
- Maryland highway system; Interstate; US; State; Scenic Byways
← MD 586	→ MD 588

Maryland Route 587 (MD 587) is a state highway in the U.S. state of Maryland. Known as Wilson Point Road, the state highway runs 1.14 miles (1.83 km) from Dogwood Drive north to MD 150 within Middle River in southeastern Baltimore County. MD 587 provides access to Martin State Airport. The state highway was constructed in the mid-1930s from MD 150 to Wilson Point. MD 587's southern terminus was moved to its present spot in the mid-1980s.

== Route description ==
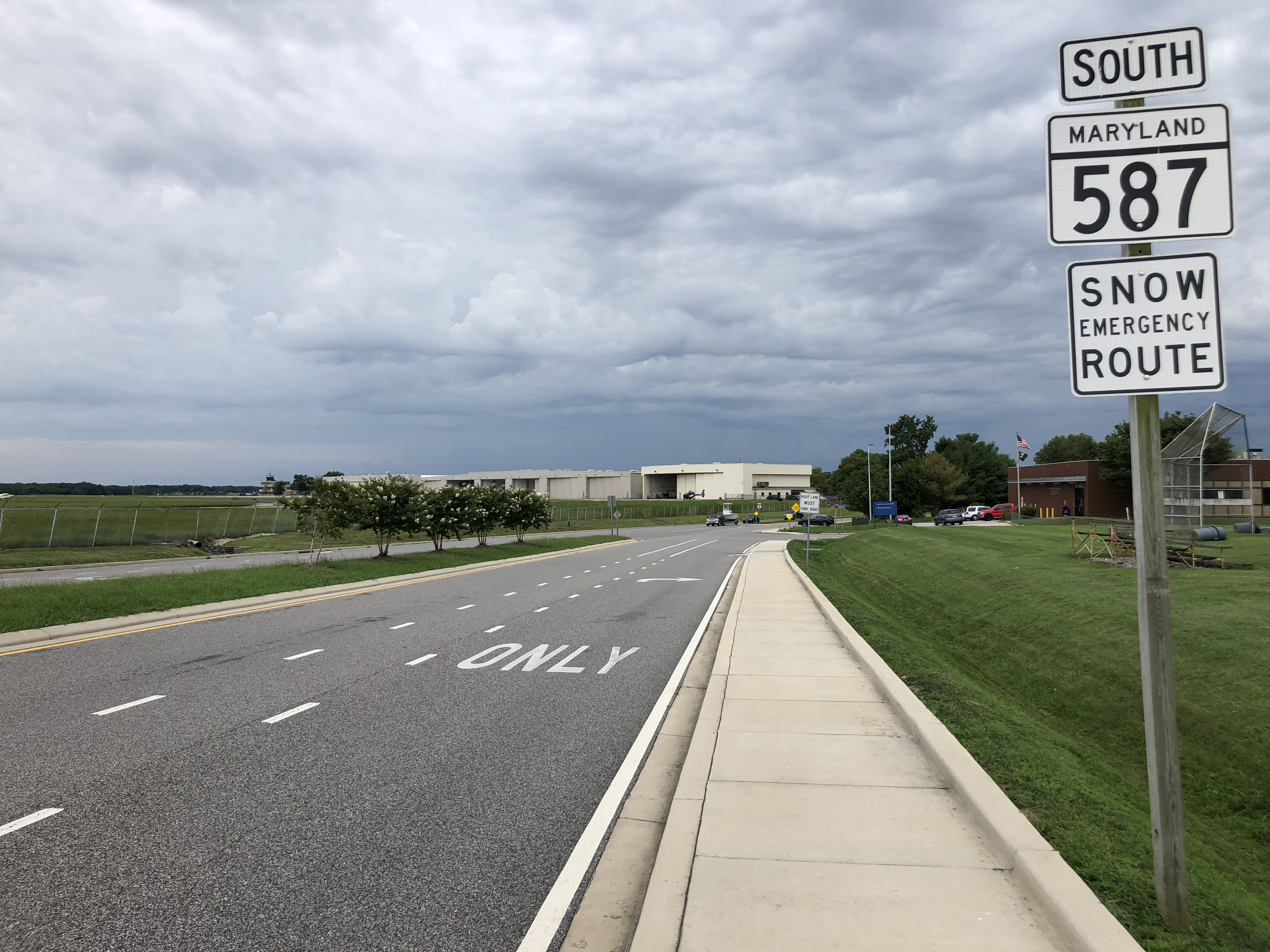
View south from the north end of MD 587 at MD 150 in Middle River

MD 587 begins at the intersection of Wilson Point Road and Dogwood Drive. Wilson Point Road continues south as a two-lane undivided county highway through a residential neighborhood toward the namesake promontory at the confluence of Stansbury Creek on the east and Middle River on the west. MD 587 heads north as a two-lane divided highway between Martin State Airport on the east and apartment complexes on the west. After passing the main entrance to Martin State Airport, the west side of the state highway is lined by Lockheed Martin's Middle River Complex. MD 587 reaches its northern terminus at an intersection with MD 150 (Eastern Boulevard) just south of Amtrak's Northeast Corridor railroad line.

== History ==
MD 587 was constructed as a macadam road along what was originally Bull Neck Road from MD 150 to Wilson Point in 1934. The state highway was widened with a pair of 2-foot (0.61 m) wide concrete shoulders around 1940. MD 587's intersection with MD 150 was rebuilt as a directional crossover intersection when MD 150 was expanded to a four-lane divided highway through Middle River in 1944. The intersection was converted to a standard three-way intersection when MD 587 was expanded to a four-lane divided highway along its present length in 1964. The state highway's southern terminus was moved north to Dogwood Drive around 1987. In 2017, the road was redone adding curbing on both sides and the center divider was widened to make this road one lane each way with a bicycle lane on the right. A sidewalk was added on the west side of the road running south from MD 150 (Eastern Boulevard) to the apartment complex attaching to an existing sidewalk running the rest of the way down Wilson Point Road. The original divider was concrete but the widened one has been changed to green space with grass and in some sections small bushes and runs to the end of MD 587.

== Junction list ==
The entire route is in Middle River, Baltimore County.

mi	km	Destinations	Notes
0.00	0.00	Wilson Point Road south / Dogwood Drive west	Southern terminus
1.14	1.83	MD 150 (Eastern Boulevard) – Chase, Essex	Northern terminus
1.000 mi = 1.609 km; 1.000 km = 0.621 mi
