= Joseph C. Palczynski =

American mass murderer

Joseph Palcynski
- Born: Joseph Chester Palczynski; November 11, 1968; Baltimore, Maryland, U.S.
- Died: March 21, 2000 (aged 31); Dundalk, Maryland, U.S.
- Other name: "Joby"
- Occupations: Electrician and bodybuilder
- Parent: Patricia "Pat" Long (mother)

Details
- Date: March 17–21, 2000
- Locations: Baltimore, Maryland, USA
- Killed: 4
- Weapons: .223-caliber Colt AR-15 semi-automatic rifle 12-gauge Mossberg 500 pump-action shotgun

Joseph Chester "Joe" Palczynski (November 11, 1968 – March 21, 2000) was a spree killer in the suburbs of Baltimore who in March 2000 killed four people and held a family of three as hostages in nearly a four-day standoff, one of the longest known conducted by one man.

The saga ended when the two adult hostages escaped the house, the third—a child—was rescued, and Baltimore County Police fatally shot Palczynski as he was reaching for a gun. A woman was convicted and sentenced for buying weapons for a convicted felon, because she bought guns for him before he committed these crimes.

== Background ==
In the years before his shooting rampage, Palczynski, an electrician and bodybuilder, had a lengthy record of domestic violence and related crimes. He had been in and out of prison, mental institutions, and was on parole or probation on many occasions. Some of his earlier crimes included assault and battery.

On one occasion, he apparently caused one of his ex-girlfriends to have a miscarriage after he beat her. In 1992 he had been involved in a standoff in Idaho that lasted 16 hours.

At the time of the shootings, Palczynski was unemployed and wanted for violating his parole.

== Initial rampage ==
=== First three killings ===
On March 7, 2000, a triple homicide occurred in the quiet community of Bowley's Quarters near Middle River (a suburb to the east of Baltimore), an area not accustomed to violent crime. George and Gloria Shenk, ages 49 and 50, respectively, and their neighbor, David Meyers, aged 42, were shot to death as Palczynski kidnapped his estranged girlfriend, Tracy Whitehead, then 22, and drove away with her in his mother's car. The Shenks had sheltered Whitehead, who had accused Palczynski of abusing her. She had recently left him and planned to move into her own apartment from her parents' house, where she had been living.

=== Police manhunt ===
For ten days following the triple shooting, Palczynski was the subject of an intense manhunt involving every available law enforcement unit. The officers, using the latest technology and all available equipment, formed a barrier with roadblocks and other borders, surrounding the area where they believed Palczynski had been. On two occasions, Palczynski was able to penetrate the barriers and evade capture. It was believed that he was trying to contact longtime friend Kevin Massengill (assumed to be sympathetic to Palczynski's cause, as he also had a long history of violence, antisocial behavior, lack of respect for authority and domestic abuse).

=== Fourth killing ===
During the evening of Wednesday, March 8, Palczynski attempted to hijack a car. Jennifer Lynn McDonel (or McDonell), aged 36, the pregnant mother of a 2-year-old girl, was fatally wounded from being hit by a ricochet bullet in front of her family during his unsuccessful carjacking attempt in Chase, Maryland. Palczynski later carjacked an 81-year-old woman, who was not injured. Following this incident, Palczynski took Whitehead to the El Rich motel on Pulaski Highway, where they were in room 25. Palczynski saw McDonel's death and the carjacking reported on the news in the motel room, and realized his guns were in the vehicle which he had just stolen, and which police were looking for. He went outside with Whitehead to retrieve them. As they stepped outside, Whitehead saw a police car, which she ran to, and Palczynski fled into the nearby woods.

== Hostage kidnapped in Virginia ==
On Friday, March 10, Palczynski fled to Virginia, where he kidnapped William Louis Terrell and ordered him to transport him back to eastern Baltimore County. Palszynski was believed by investigators to have hitched a ride on a train to Virginia. He told Terrell he had paid a woman to transport him there. During the kidnapping, he ordered Terrell to drive to a shopping center in White Marsh, which included a Best Buy and a Target. He ordered him to purchase food and various survival equipment, as well as a battery-operated television with cash given by Palczynski. He threatened to shoot "whoever was around" if Terrell did not comply.

Police found Terrell in his pickup truck at 3:30 a.m. on Saturday morning after Palczynski released him. Terrell said he had relied on his "faith" during his ordeal. He had been keeping his promise not to call police. Terrell was among several people whom Palczynski had encountered since the first incident and who was not harmed.

== Siege ==
On Friday, March 17, Palczynski penetrated a barrier and reached nearby Dundalk, Maryland, going to the home of Tracy Whitehead's mother Lynn, her boyfriend Andrew McCord, and their 12-year-old son, Bradley McCord. Bradley let him into the house, as he did not understand the danger Palczynski posed. For the following 97 hours, nearly four days, Palczynski held the family hostage in their home, ignoring the requests of law enforcement and negotiators to release them, and occasionally firing shots.

During the standoff, no one was permitted to enter the neighborhood of the hostage situation, an area that police defined as an "inner perimeter". All area residents were asked to stay at a shelter that was set up at a nearby elementary school. Several people who violated the police perimeter were arrested. The Baltimore County Tactical Squad requisitioned a nearby house, in which there was a barking dog. The Tactical Squad shot and killed the dog.

Palczynski made one demand to officers throughout the ordeal: to speak with Whitehead. Police denied this request. Afterward, they justified their decision, saying that it was his only request, and they feared that if they granted it, he might have killed Whitehead's mother and the other hostages while Tracy listened on the phone. Later it was reported that he also wanted to speak with his own mother, Pat Long, and Contrino. During this time, police kept Whitehead at an undisclosed location, under 24-hour police guard. Afterward it was revealed that they had her in a room at a Holiday Inn.

=== End of siege ===
On the evening of Tuesday, March 21, the adult hostages took matters into their own hands. They laced a glass of iced tea with Xanax, and after Palczynski drank it, he fell asleep. Andrew McCord fled out the front window, alone. Although he made a lot of noise in his panicked escape, Palczynski did not wake. Whitehead's mother also escaped. They left behind their son Bradley, who was sleeping on the kitchen floor, expecting police to rescue him. Fearing for the boy's life, officers broke into the home.

There have been many discussions about why the parents left the boy behind. A documentary aired on British TV station More 4 on April 7, 2010, said that they believed, because he was a child, if they woke him up he might be upset, make noise, and wake up Palczynski. They feared the man might kill them all then. They thought it best for the adults to escape and let the police rescue the boy.

According to officers, Palczynski, who had last been seen lying on top of his weapons, had sat up and reached for a weapon. Officers shot him numerous times, killing him. While the events were shown live on television from a perimeter outside the house, viewers did not see the fatal shooting of Palczynski.

== Aftermath ==
An investigation and autopsy revealed that Palczynski had been shot 27 times by officers. The autopsy found no traces of any drugs or alcohol other than the Xanax used to knock him out. While some members of the public questioned the shooting of an unarmed man, the police determined their actions were justified.

Shortly after the shootings, a woman was charged with illegally purchasing firearms for a convicted felon, Palczynski. She had no prior criminal record. Palczynski paid her for a shotgun that she was selling, a day before he shot his first three victims. She was also ordered in a civil lawsuit to pay $450,000 to the families of the victims.

== Reward collection attempt in Palczynski's apprehension ==
After the siege, McCord attempted to collect a $10,000 reward offered for the apprehension of Palczynski, claiming he was the first to call 911, which resulted in capture of the suspect. He was rejected because he did not call Metro Crime Stoppers, the tipline that offers the rewards. Calling this hotline is required in order to collect any rewards being offered in the capture of a fugitive.

== Hostages' lawsuit against police ==
McCord and Whitehead, the former hostages, filed a lawsuit against police, alleging that the department failed to protect them and their son. The police said that they had offered various forms of protection to the family, which they turned down. These included having an officer stay in their house, having a police unit parked in front of their house, and increasing patrols to their neighborhood while Palczynski was still at large.

== See also ==
- Fugitives
- List of hostage crises
- Serial killers
- John Thanos, a spree killer from Dundalk, Maryland
