= Maryland Route 150 =

State highway in, Maryland, US, known as Eastern Ave or Eastern Blvd

Maryland Route 150
- Maryland Route 150 highlighted in red

Route information
- Maintained by MDSHA and Baltimore DOT
- Length: 13.01 mi (20.94 km)
- Existed: 1927–present

Major junctions
- West end: US 40 in Baltimore
- I-895 Toll in Baltimore; I-95 in Baltimore; MD 151 in Dundalk; I-695 in Dundalk; MD 702 in Essex; MD 700 in Middle River; MD 587 in Middle River; MD 43 in Middle River
- East end: Graces Quarters Road in Chase

Location
- Country: United States
- State: Maryland
- Counties: City of Baltimore, Baltimore

Highway system
- Maryland highway system; Interstate; US; State; Scenic Byways
← MD 147	→ MD 151

Maryland Route 150 (MD 150) is a state highway in the U.S. state of Maryland. Known for most of its length as either Eastern Avenue or Eastern Boulevard, the highway runs 13.01 miles (20.94 km) from U.S. Route 40 (US 40) in Baltimore east to Graces Quarters Road in Chase in eastern Baltimore County. MD 150 connects Baltimore with its southeastern suburbs of Dundalk, Essex, and Middle River. The state highway also links those communities with Interstate 95 (I-95), I-695, I-895, and Martin State Airport. MD 150 was constructed from Baltimore to Middle River and in Chase in the mid-1920s. The road was completed through Middle River in the early 1930s. Between 1942 and 1944, MD 150 was reconstructed as a four-lane divided highway with interchanges to improve access between Baltimore and the Glenn L. Martin Company aircraft manufacturing plant in Middle River. The highway has followed several routes since it was extended west into the city of Baltimore in the mid-1940s; the present route in East Baltimore was established shortly after 2000.

== Route description ==
MD 150 is known as Eastern Avenue from just west of I-895 in Baltimore to the Back River between Dundalk and Essex. The highway is also named Eastern Avenue from Carroll Island Road in Middle River to the highway's eastern terminus in Chase. Between the two sections of Eastern Avenue, MD 150 follows Eastern Boulevard through Essex and Middle River. The state highway is maintained by the Baltimore City Department of Transportation in the city of Baltimore and by the Maryland State Highway Administration in Baltimore County. MD 150 is a part of the National Highway System as a rail-to-truck intermodal freight transport connection from its western terminus at US 40 to I-95 within Baltimore. The highway is also a National Highway System principal arterial from I-95 to Carroll Island Road in Middle River.

=== Baltimore to Dundalk ===
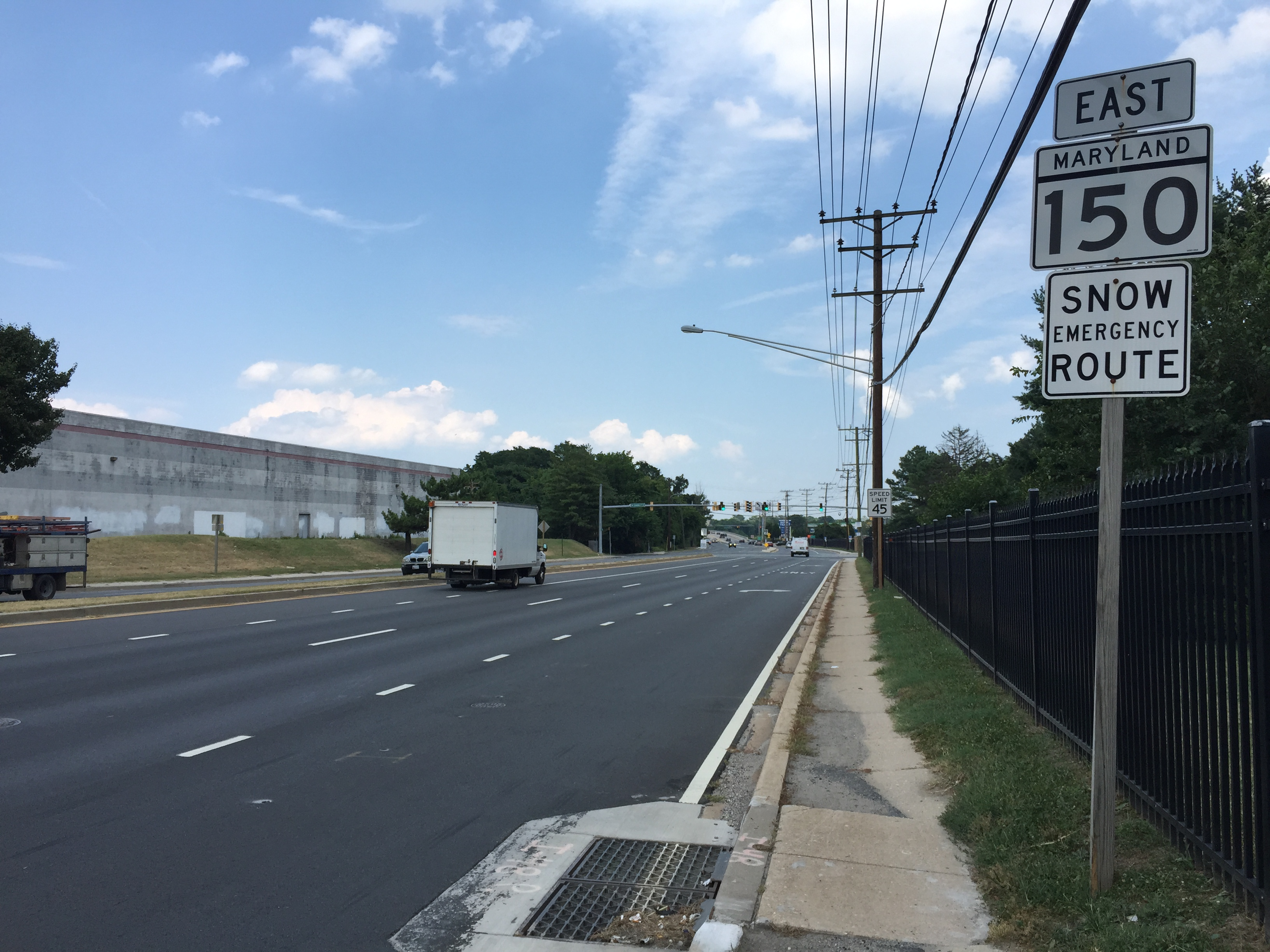
View east along MD 150 in Dundalk

MD 150 begins at an intersection with US 40 (Pulaski Highway) in East Baltimore. The route heads south as Haven Street, a four-lane undivided street that passes through an industrial area. East of the Highlandtown neighborhood, MD 150 turns east onto Lombard Street, which crosses over three rail spurs that head south to Canton; one line splits from CSX's Philadelphia Subdivision railroad line, while the other two spring from the Amtrak's Northeast Corridor railroad line and are operated by Norfolk Southern Railway. The state highway's run on Lombard Street ends at Ponca Street; Lombard Street continues east toward ramps to northbound I-895 (Harbor Tunnel Thruway) and Johns Hopkins Bayview Medical Center. MD 150 turns south onto Ponca Street, a four-lane divided highway that has a ramp to southbound I-895 toward the Baltimore Harbor Tunnel. The highway follows Ponca Street to the Greektown neighborhood, where MD 150 turns east onto Eastern Avenue and immediately crosses over I-895.

MD 150 continues east as a six-lane divided highway that reduces to four lanes at Dundalk Avenue. The highway runs through the Joseph Lee neighborhood, where it intersects Kane Street and crosses the Canton Railroad at-grade before the highway's partial cloverleaf interchange with I-95. Access from eastbound MD 150 to southbound I-95 is provided via Kane Street to the south. Just east of I-95, the state highway enters Baltimore County. While passing along the northern edge of Dundalk, MD 150 follows the edge of Oaklawn Cemetery and meets MD 151 (North Point Boulevard) at a cloverleaf interchange. The route passes along the north side of the Eastpoint Mall, crosses the Norfolk Southern Railway's Sparrows Point Industrial Track line to Sparrows Point, and meets I-695 (Baltimore Beltway) at a partial cloverleaf interchange. Access from northbound I-695 to westbound MD 150 and from eastbound MD 150 to southbound I-695 is provided through MD 151. East of the Beltway, MD 150 passes the city of Baltimore's Back River Waste Water Treatment Plant and crosses the Back River.

=== Essex to Chase ===
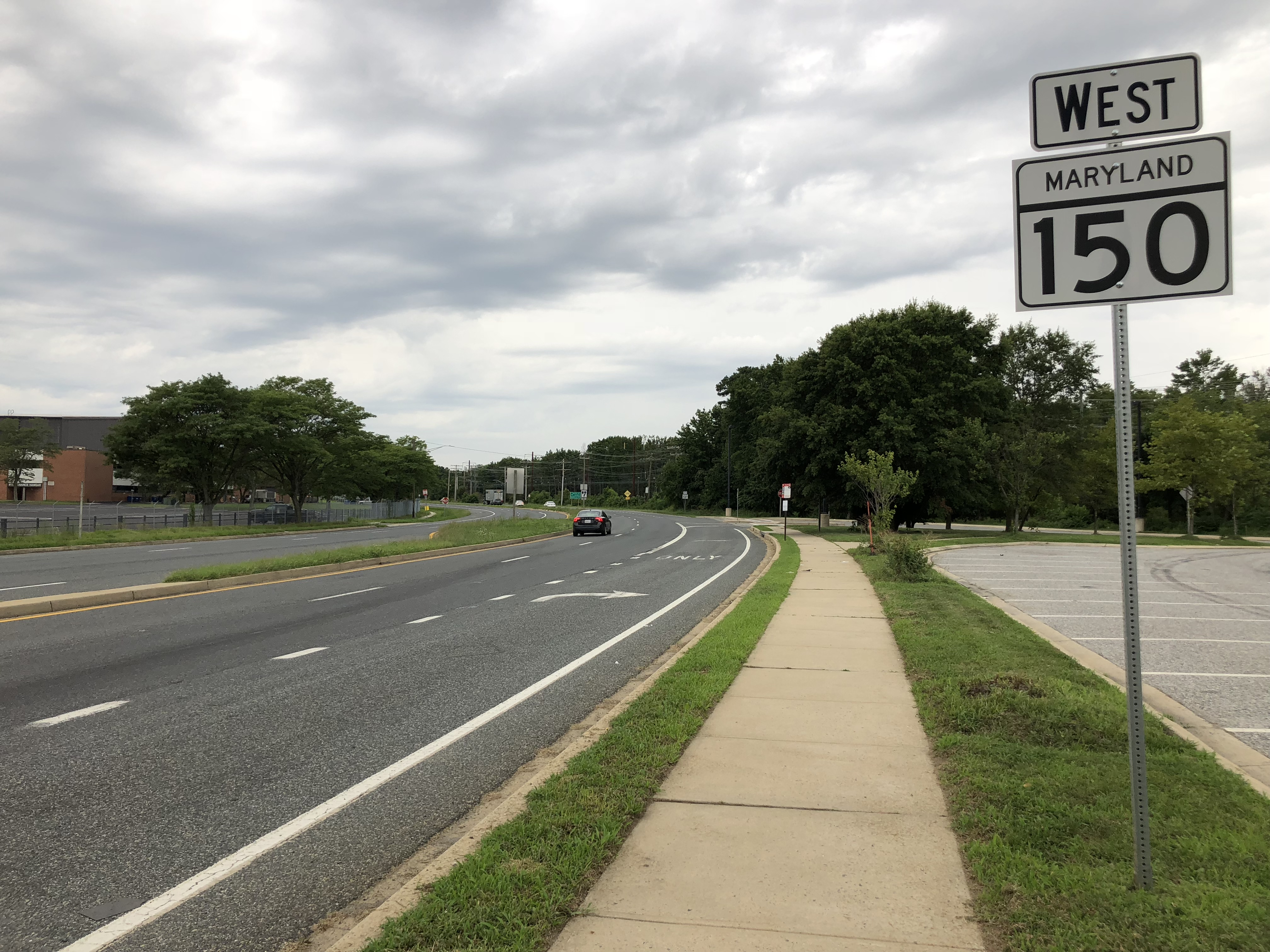
MD 150 westbound past MD 43 in Middle River

On the east side of the Back River, MD 150 enters the densely populated community of Essex. Just east of Marlyn Avenue, the highway's old alignment, Old Eastern Avenue, splits to the east. In the center of Essex, MD 150 has a partial interchange with MD 702 (Southeast Boulevard) that only allows access to and from the north; access to the southern part of the Back River Neck is provided via Old Eastern Avenue's connection with MD 702 or the parallel Stemmers Run Road. The route continues northeast and receives the other end of Old Eastern Avenue before crossing the Middle River into the community of Middle River. MD 150 has a partial cloverleaf interchange with MD 700 (Martin Boulevard) at Lockheed Martin's Middle River Complex. The highway closely parallels Amtrak's Northeast Corridor and meets the northern end of MD 587 (Wilson Point Road), after which the route passes along the northern edge of Martin State Airport. MD 150 curves away from the railroad just west of the Martin State Airport station on MARC's Penn Line and the highway's intersection with MD 43 (White Marsh Boulevard).

East of MD 43 and the adjacent General Services Administration facility, MD 150 becomes a five-lane road with a center left-turn lane east to Carroll Island Road. East of that county highway, which leads to the community of Bowleys Quarters, the state highway reduces to two lanes. MD 150 passes under a Norfolk Southern Railway spur from Amtrak's Northeast Corridor to the former Charles P. Crane Generating Station and intersects Marshy Point Road, which leads into Dundee Natural Environment Area. The route ends at its intersection with Ebenezer Road and Graces Quarter Road in the community of Chase. Graces Quarter Road serves as a connector to the main section of the county highway, which heads east into a unit of Gunpowder Falls State Park. The county highway also heads west as Ebenezer Road, which passes over Eastern Avenue and Amtrak's Northeast Corridor immediately to the northeast on Eastern Avenue. Eastern Avenue itself continues northeast as a county highway to its end at Greenbank Road on the Gunpowder River.

== History ==
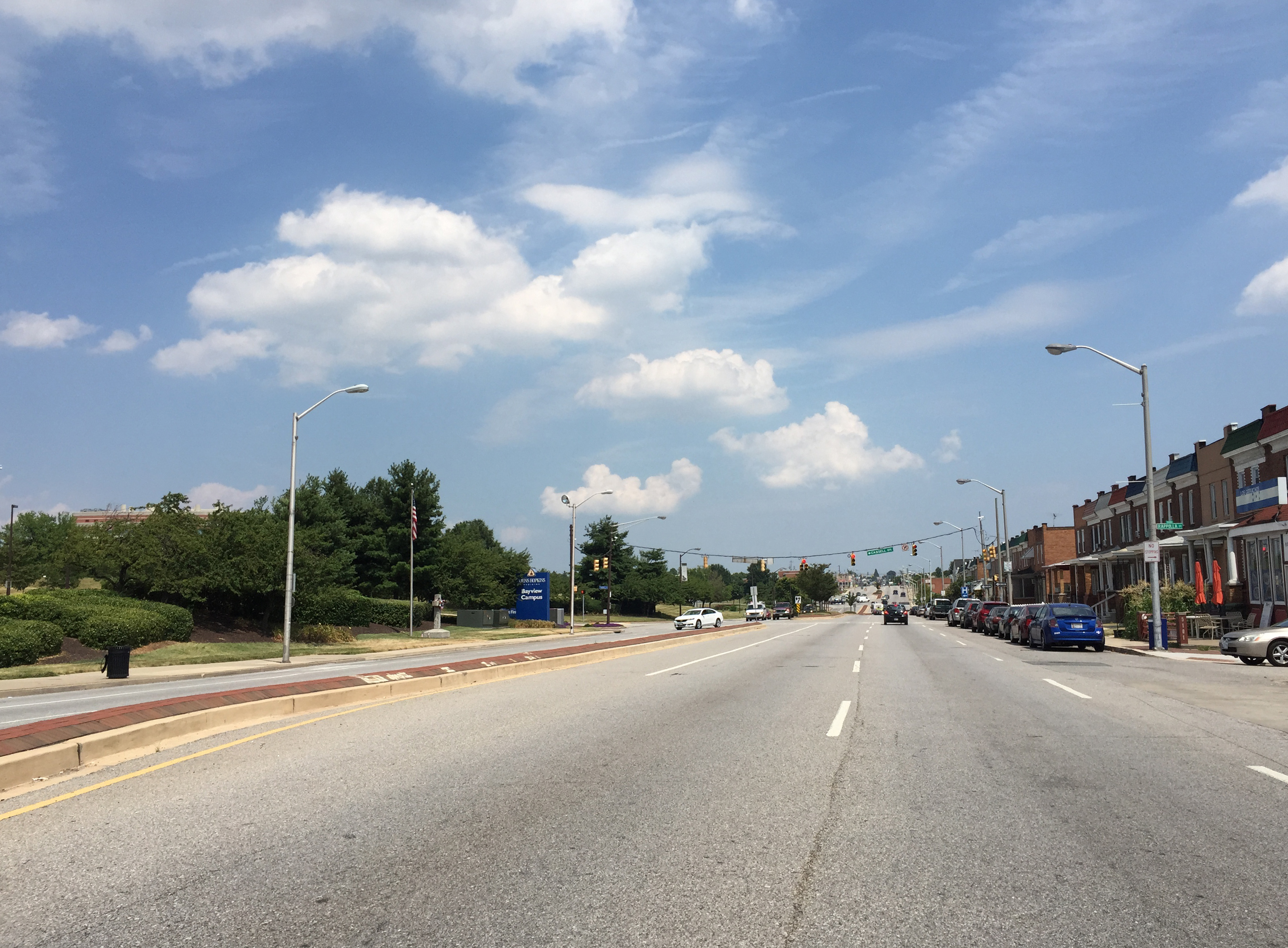
MD 150 eastbound along Eastern Avenue in Baltimore

The predecessor highway of MD 150 was an oyster shell road from the village of Highlandtown (later annexed by Baltimore) to Chase. Between the Back River and Middle River, this highway was operated as the east–west segment of the Back River Neck Turnpike; the turnpike also included what is now Back River Neck Road. The first portion of Eastern Avenue improved by the Maryland State Roads Commission was from the eastern terminus in Chase to east of Earls Road, which was paved as a 15-foot (4.6 m) wide concrete road around 1923. MD 150 was constructed as a macadam road from the Baltimore city line to the crossing of Middle River in 1924; this section would be widened with concrete shoulders to a width of 18 to 20 feet (5.5 to 6.1 m) by 1926. The gap between the Middle River and east of Earls Road remained a county highway until the existing highway was supplemented by concrete shoulders and repaved in macadam between 1932 and 1934. The portion of Eastern Avenue in the city of Baltimore was not part of MD 150, which had its western terminus at the city–county line as of 1939.

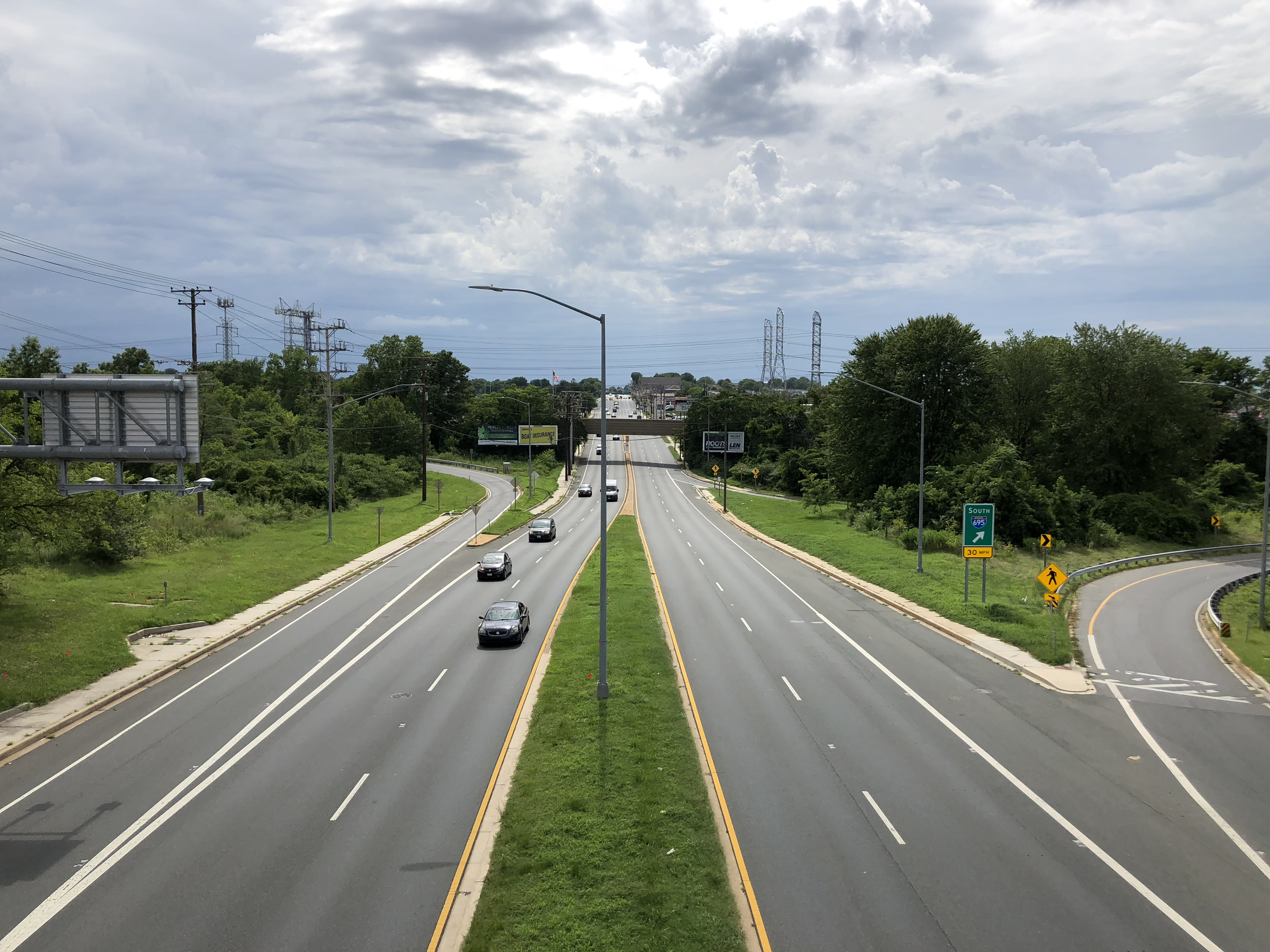
View west along MD 150 from I-695 in Dundalk

Suburban development in Dundalk and Essex and the establishment of the Glenn L. Martin Company aircraft manufacturing plant in Middle River in 1929 resulted in heavy traffic along MD 150. By 1934, an average of 5,275 vehicles per day used the highway between Baltimore and Middle River, leading the Maryland State Roads Commission to recommend widening the highway to 40 feet (12 m) in width. Relief did not come until just before World War II when MD 150 from Baltimore to Middle River was deemed a vital defense connection between the city and the Martin aircraft plant. MD 150 was expanded to a four-lane divided highway from Dundalk Avenue in Baltimore to east of the Martin aircraft plant in Middle River between 1942 and 1944. This expansion involved the construction of interchanges at Martin Boulevard (later designated MD 700) and North Point Boulevard, a northern extension of MD 151 that was also constructed as a defense access project. Replacement bridges were built over the Back River and Middle River. MD 150 was also relocated in Essex; Old Eastern Avenue was designated MD 600, a designation removed by 1956.

By 1946, MD 150 had been extended west into the city of Baltimore over Eastern Avenue at least as far as Highlandtown. Around 1950, the state highway followed Highland Avenue south from US 40 to Eastern Avenue. MD 150 was moved to Kresson Street, Lombard Street, and Ponca Street, which met Eastern Avenue just west of its present junction, in 1960. Around 1963, Haven Street and Kresson Street were converted to a one-way pair, with Haven Street carrying eastbound traffic south and Kresson Street handling westbound traffic toward US 40. The portion of Lombard Street between Haven and Kresson was added to MD 150; the state highway was also extended north on Haven and Kresson to Monument Street, then east along Monument Street to MD 150's new western terminus at US 40 at the U.S. Highway's underpass of CSX's Philadelphia Subdivision. This convoluted path was ameliorated around 2002 when the highway was shortened to its present course in East Baltimore.

== Junction list ==
County	Location	mi	km	Destinations	Notes
Baltimore City		0.00	0.00	US 40 (Pulaski Highway) / Haven Street north	Western terminus
Baltimore City		0.38	0.61	Lombard Street west / Haven Street south	MD 150 turns east onto Lombard Street
Baltimore City		0.76	1.22	Lombard Street east to I-895 north (Harbor Tunnel Thruway)	MD 150 turns south onto Ponca Street
Baltimore City		0.86	1.38	I-895 Toll south (Harbor Tunnel Thruway)	I-895 Exit 12; southbound entrance from MD 150 to I-895 only
Baltimore City		1.10	1.77	Eastern Avenue west / Ponca Street south	MD 150 turns east onto Eastern Avenue
Baltimore City		2.23	3.59	I-95 – Washington, New York	I-95 Exit 59; no direct access from eastbound MD 150 to southbound I-95
Baltimore	Dundalk	3.21	5.17	MD 151 (North Point Boulevard) to I-695 south – Sparrows Point	Cloverleaf interchange
Baltimore	Dundalk	4.02	6.47	I-695 (Baltimore Beltway) – Towson, Sparrows Point	I-695 Exit 38; no direct access from eastbound MD 150 to southbound I-695 or from northbound I-695 to westbound MD 150
Baltimore	Essex	6.93	11.15	MD 702 north (Southeast Boulevard) to I-695	Partial interchange; no direct access from MD 150 to southbound MD 702 or from northbound MD 702 to MD 150
Baltimore	Middle River	8.34	13.42	MD 700 north (Martin Boulevard) to US 40	Partial cloverleaf interchange; southern terminus of MD 700
Baltimore	Middle River	8.89	14.31	MD 587 south (Wilson Point Road) – Martin State Airport, Wilson Point	Northern terminus of MD 587
Baltimore	Middle River	9.45	15.21	MD 43 west (White Marsh Boulevard) to I-95 / US 40 – White Marsh	Eastern terminus of MD 43
Baltimore	Chase	13.01	20.94	Eastern Avenue east / Graces Quarters Road east / Ebenezer Road west	Eastern terminus
1.000 mi = 1.609 km; 1.000 km = 0.621 mi: Incomplete access
