= Capital Airlines Flight 67 =

1958 plane crash in Michigan, United States

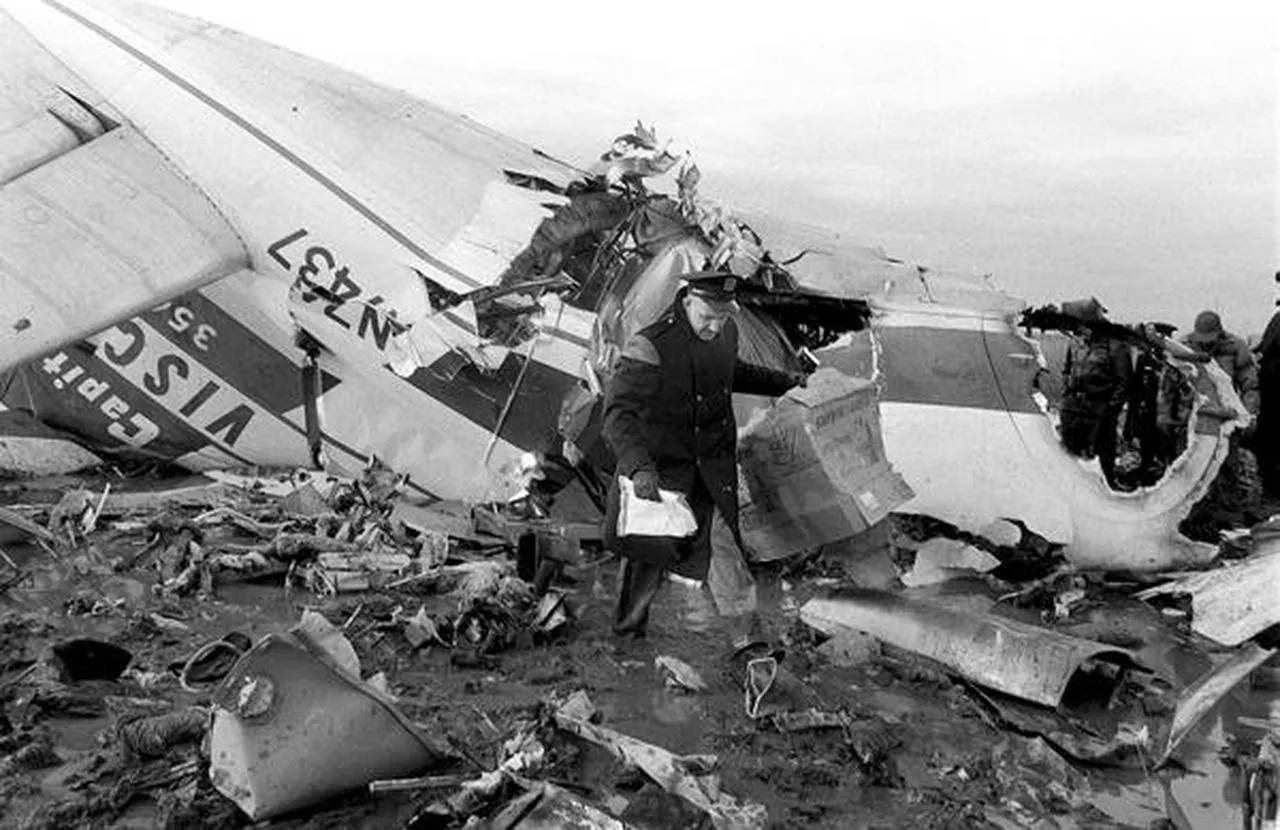
- A first responder removes debris from the wreckage of Capital Airlines Flight 67

Accident
- Date: April 6, 1958
- Summary: Stall, loss of control
- Site: Tittabawassee Township, near Freeland-Tri City Airport, Freeland, Michigan, United States; 43°31′14.05″N 84°5′54.91″W

Aircraft
- Aircraft type: Vickers Viscount
- Operator: Capital Airlines
- Registration: N7437
- Flight origin: Newark International Airport; Newark, New Jersey, United States
- 1st stopover: Willow Run Airport, Ypsilanti, Michigan, United States
- 2nd stopover: Flint-Bishop Airport, Flint, Michigan, United States
- 3rd stopover: Freeland-Tri City Airport, Freeland, Michigan, United States
- 4th stopover: Capital City Airport, Lansing, Michigan, United States
- 5th stopover: Kent County Airport, Cascade Township, Michigan, United States
- Destination: Chicago Midway Airport, Chicago, Illinois, United States
- Passengers: 44
- Crew: 3
- Fatalities: 47
- Survivors: 0

Capital Airlines Flight 67 was a domestic scheduled U.S. passenger flight operated by Capital Airlines which crashed on final approach to Freeland, Michigan, during a severe snowstorm on April 6, 1958, killing all 47 people on board. The flight was en route from Flint-Bishop Airport to the Freeland-Tri City Airport (now MBS International Airport) when it crashed. Flight 67 was the first of four fatal crashes in the space of two years involving Capital Airlines Vickers Viscounts; the others were Flight 300 (May 1958), Flight 75 (May 1959), and Flight 20 (January 1960).

== Accident ==
Approach conditions towards Tri-City Airport, Freeland, Michigan were poor due to the weather; there was restricted visibility, and conditions were ripe for icing. The plane while descending below the 900 foot overcast suddenly pitched over and impacted the ground. The point of impact was 2,322 feet from the end of runway 5. The "entire wreckage was confined in an area almost equal to the length and span of the aircraft." Witnesses stated that aircraft rolled out of the base leg of the approach on to final approach and was level for from four to six seconds before it pitched over and crashed.

== Investigation ==
The probable cause of the crash was "an undetected accretion of ice on the horizontal stabilized which, in conjunction with a specific airspeed and aircraft configuration, caused a loss of pitch control."

A memorial to the victims was unveiled in a local cemetery between 2006 and 2007.
