= Capital Airlines Flight 75 =

1959 aviation accident

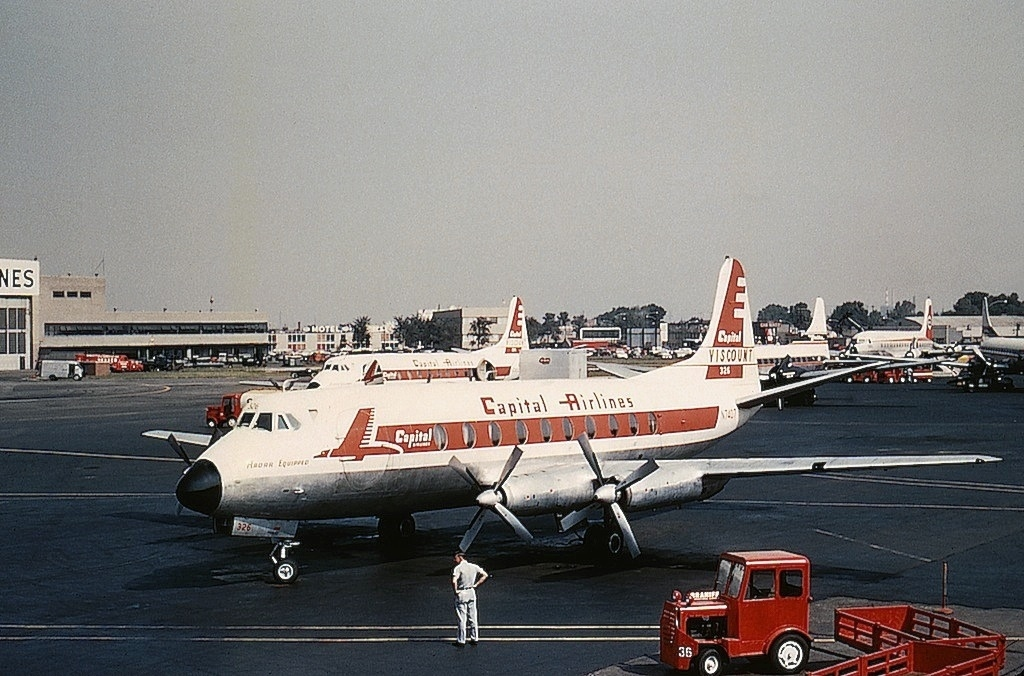
- A Capital Airlines Vickers Viscount similar to the one which crashed.

Accident
- Date: May 12, 1959
- Summary: In-flight structural failure following weather-induced loss of control
- Site: Chase, Maryland, United States; 39°20.5′N 76°23.0′W

Aircraft
- Aircraft type: Vickers 745D Viscount
- Operator: Capital Airlines
- Registration: N7463
- Flight origin: LaGuardia Airport
- Destination: Hartsfield–Jackson Atlanta International Airport
- Occupants: 31
- Passengers: 27
- Crew: 4
- Fatalities: 31
- Survivors: 0

Capital Airlines Flight 75 was a domestic scheduled Capital Airlines passenger flight between LaGuardia Airport and Hartsfield–Jackson Atlanta International Airport in Atlanta, Georgia. A Vickers Viscount flying the route crashed near Chase, Maryland, on May 12, 1959, with the loss of all on board. The crash was the third of four involving a Capital Airlines Vickers Viscount in less than two years; the other three were Capital Airlines Flight 67 (April 1958), Capital Airlines Flight 300 (May 1958), and Capital Airlines Flight 20 (January 1960).

== Accident ==
The flight left the terminal at La Guardia at 3:20 in the afternoon, 20 minutes behind schedule, and took off at 3:29. It then climbed to 14,000 feet before coming onto the assigned airway, Victor 3. At 4:02, the crew contacted Washington Center, reporting over Westchester, and estimating Westminster to be 15 minutes away. In the same message, they noted that thunderstorms existed along the assigned course, and requested permission to navigate clear of the weather a little south of Westminster. The air traffic controller acknowledged the message and gave the go-ahead. At 4:10, the flight called again, the pilots noting that they had slowed somewhat to account for turbulence. This was the last message sent by the flight crew; three minutes later, the plane entered an area of severe turbulence, lost control, and entered a steep descent.

The craft is believed to have reached an airspeed of 335 knots, fully 15% more than the Viscount's never exceed speed, and about 5% in excess of the maximum speed demonstrated when the plane was certified. Consequently, at about 5000 feet, both of the horizontal stabilizers failed at once, separating downward. The separation caused the plane to pitch violently nose-down; the gyroscopic loads combined with inertia caused all four engine nacelles to break upward. Both wings were then subjected to extreme downloads. Under the pressure, the right wing separated, and the integrity of the left was completely destroyed.

With so much of the aircraft's superstructure gone, the left wing induced drag on the fuselage, yawing it violently to the left. More forces from that direction tore off the vertical stabilizer, which came away with portions of the fuselage, already weakened from losing the left stabilizer. Further gyrations caused the left wing to disintegrate, opening its fuel tanks and leading to a flash fire. What was left of the fuselage crumbled, and the craft plunged to the ground.

== Cause ==
The cause of the accident was determined to be a loss of control of the plane in turbulence, resulting in an involuntary steep descent, which created aerodynamic loads in excess of those for which the craft had been designed.
