= Capital Airlines Flight 300 =

1958 aviation accident

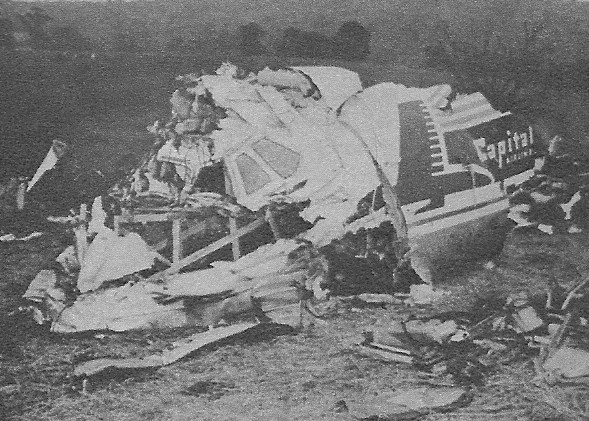
- Forward section of the Vickers Viscount

Accident
- Date: May 20, 1958
- Summary: Mid-air collision
- Site: 4 miles (3.5 nmi; 6.4 km) east-northeast of Brunswick, Maryland, U.S.; 39°19′50″N 77°32′39″W
- Total fatalities: 12
- Total injuries: 1
- Total survivors: 1

First aircraft
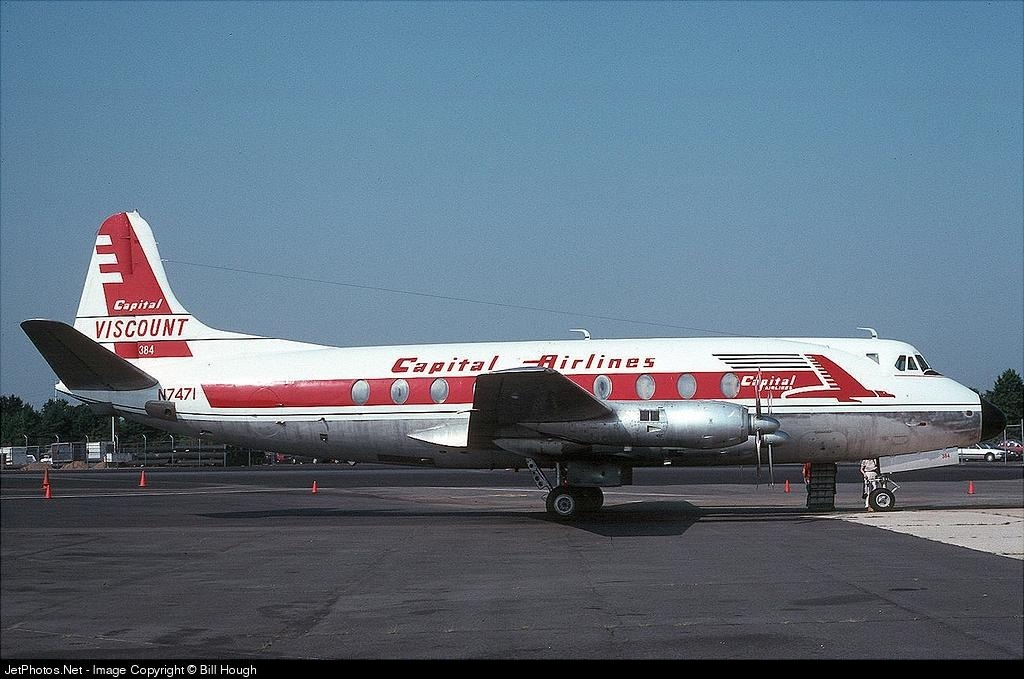
- A Vickers Viscount similar to the one involved in the incident
- Type: Vickers Viscount
- Operator: Capital Airlines
- Registration: N7410
- Flight origin: Chicago Midway Airport
- Stopover: Pittsburgh International Airport
- Destination: Martin State Airport
- Occupants: 11
- Passengers: 7
- Crew: 4
- Fatalities: 11
- Survivors: 0

Second aircraft
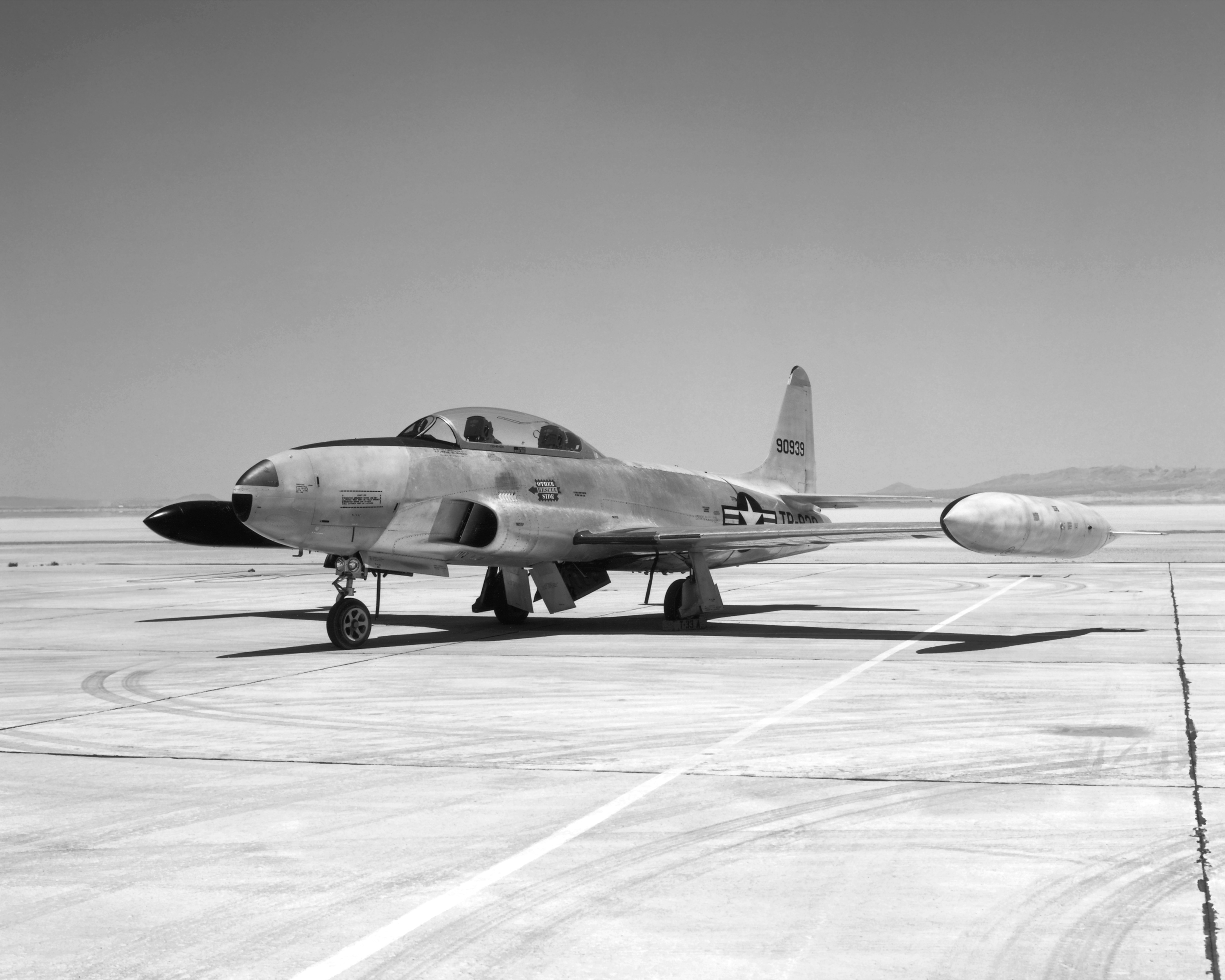
- A T-33 Shooting Star similar to the one involved in the incident
- Type: Lockheed T-33
- Operator: USAF Maryland Air National Guard
- Registration: 53-5966
- Occupants: 2
- Crew: 2
- Fatalities: 1
- Survivors: 1

On May 20, 1958, a Vickers Viscount airliner operating Capital Airlines Flight 300 was involved in a mid-air collision with a United States Air Force Lockheed T-33 jet trainer on a proficiency flight in the skies above Brunswick, Maryland. All 11 people on board the Viscount and one of the two crew in the T-33 were killed in the accident.

Flight 300 was the second of four fatal crashes in under two years involving Capital Airlines Viscounts; the others were Flight 67 (April 1958), Flight 75 (May 1959), and Flight 20 (January 1960).

An investigation of the accident concluded that the pilot in command of the T-33 failed to see and maintain a safe distance from other air traffic.

== Accident ==
Capital Airlines Flight 300 was a regular scheduled flight from Chicago, Illinois, to Baltimore, Maryland, with an intermediate stop at Pittsburgh, Pennsylvania. The flight from Chicago was uneventful, and at 10:50 local time the airliner departed Pittsburgh bound for Baltimore. At 11:25 while cruising at 11,000 feet (3,400 m) Washington Air Traffic Control cleared Flight 300 to descend and maintain 7,000 feet (2,100 m). At 11:26 the Viscount crew reported descending through 10,000 feet (3,000 m) over Martinsburg, and radar contact was made by ATC. 48 seconds later flight 300 reported leaving 9,000 feet (2,700 m) with clearance to 5,000 feet (1,500 m). This was the last radio transmission from the Viscount.

The T-33 jet trainer launched from Martin State Airport at 11:07 for a VFR familiarization flight; its air speed was significantly higher as it approached the Viscount from the left and behind. The Viscount's indicated air speed was 235 knots (270 mph; 435 km/h), while the T-33's was 290 knots (330 mph; 540 km/h) with a closing rate of approximately 195 knots (224 mph; 361 km/h). While slowly climbing through 8,000 feet (2,400 m) at 85 percent engine power, the jet banked slightly to the right and impacted the left side of the airliner forward of the wing. The airliner pitched up, its air speed decreasing, then the nose dropped and the aircraft entered a steep spin to the right, slowing to a flat spin before it struck the ground. The T-33 pilot was thrown clear of the flaming jet and parachuted safely to the ground but was badly burned. The jet disintegrated after the collision and the passenger was fatally injured.

== Aircraft and crew ==
=== Vickers aircraft and crew ===
The four engine Viscount V.745 British medium-range turboprop airliner, serial number 108, first flew from Hampshire, England on 6 January, 1956. Powered by Rolls-Royce Dart RDa3 Mark 506 engines turning four blade square tipped constant-speed propellers, it was delivered to Capital Airlines on 15 January, 1956 as fleet number 329.

The pilot in command of Flight 300 was Captain Kendall Brady, age 38. He had a valid airman certificate and was rated to fly single/multi-engine land aircraft, as well as the Douglas DC-3, DC-4, and the Vickers Viscount. Hired by Capital Airlines on June 11, 1945, Brady's total flying hours were 12,719, with 1,432 of those in the Viscount.

Paul Meyer, age 26, served as co-pilot and started flying for Capital Airlines on May 25, 1956. He was certified to operate single/multi-engine land aircraft and had an instrument rating. Meyer's total flight hours were 2,467, of which 1,596 were in the Viscount.

=== T-33 aircraft and crew ===
The two-place Lockheed T-33A Shooting Star subsonic American jet trainer aircraft involved was manufacture serial number 580-9528 and registered 53-5966. It was maintained by the Maryland Air National Guard and equipped with an Allison J33-A-35 turbojet engine.

The pilot and sole survivor of the accident was Captain Julius McCoy, age 34. He was rated as a military pilot August 4, 1944, and joined the Maryland Air National Guard in 1952. He had a total of 1,902 hours in single- and multi-engine and single-engine jet aircraft 210 were in the T-33.

The other occupant of the aircraft was a member of the ground crew.

== Investigation ==
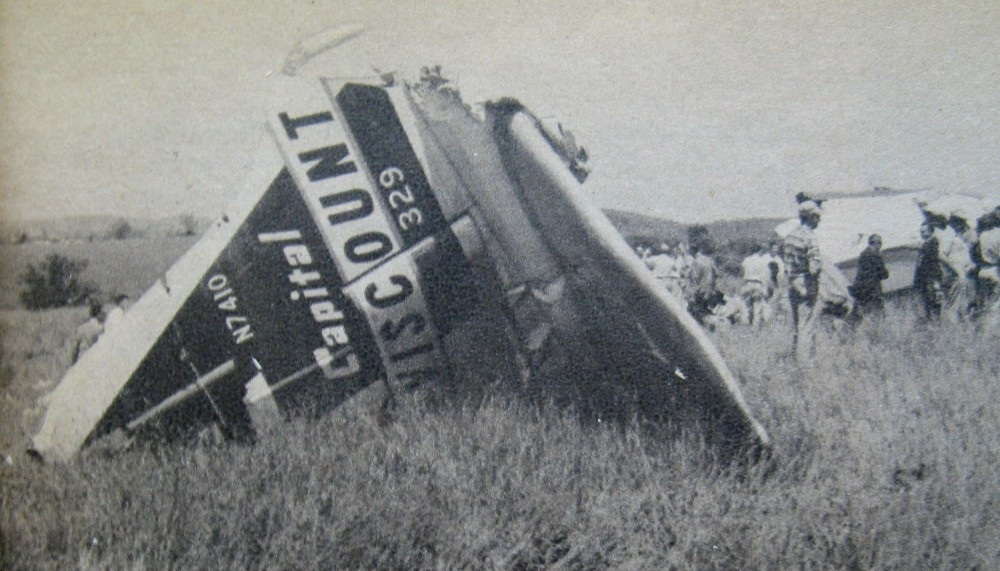
Tail section of Flight 300

The Civil Aeronautics Board (CAB) investigated the accident and released a report on January 9, 1959. It determined that the collision happened during VFR conditions, and that both aircraft would have been in clear cloud free air nine-tenths of the time. The report noted that it is the overtaking aircraft's responsibility to see and avoid a collision. A contributing factor in the accident was that the small size of the T-33 made it difficult to pick up on radar.

The board attributed no blame to the Viscount crew and stated in conclusion that "The Board determines the probable cause of this accident was the failure of the T-33 pilot to exercise a proper and adequate vigilance to see and avoid other traffic." (Note: FBI Special Agent Ronald Ralph Lichtinger Sr. was the first federal official on the scene. Lichtinger was having coffee at a diner in the area, heard the news over the radio and raced to secure the scene..)

== See also ==
- Eastern Air Lines Flight 45
- 1958 in aviation

== Notes ==
Footnotes
