= MBS International Airport =

Airport in Freeland, Michigan

- IATA: MBS; ICAO: KMBS; FAA LID: MBS

Summary
- Airport type: Public
- Owner: Bay County, Michigan, Midland, Michigan, Saginaw, Michigan
- Serves: Saginaw, Michigan; Midland, Michigan; Bay City, Michigan
- Location: Freeland, MI, United States
- Elevation AMSL: 668 ft (204 m)
- Coordinates: 43°31′58″N 084°04′47″W
- Website: www.mbsairport.org

Map
- Location of airport in Michigan MBS (the United States)

Runways
Direction	Length		Surface
Direction	ft	m	Surface
5/23	8,002	2,439	Asphalt
14/32	6,400	1,951	Asphalt

Statistics
- Total passengers (2025): 229,132
- Aircraft operations (2025): 18,351
- Based aircraft (2025): 18
- Sources: FAA, Michigan DOT

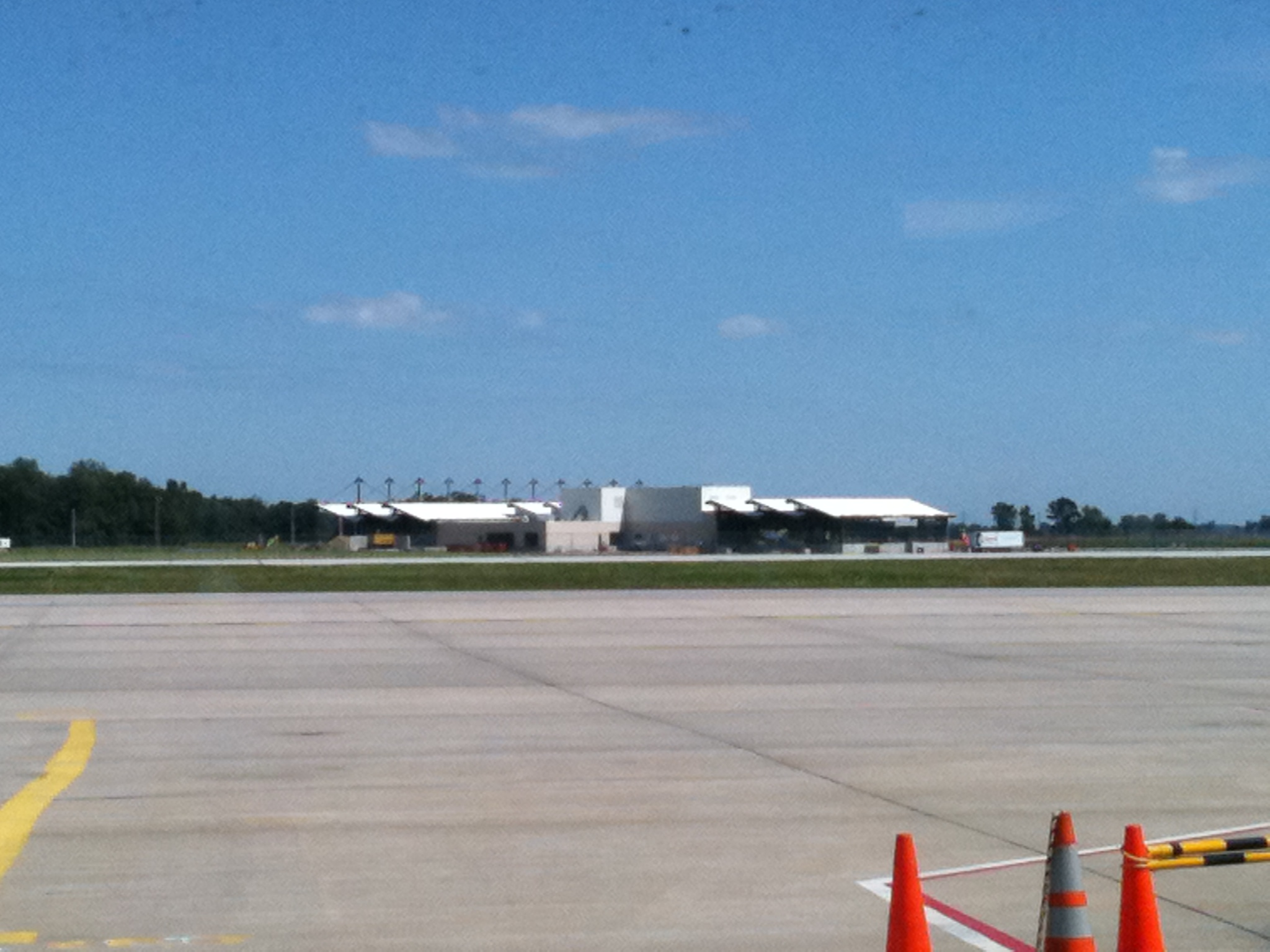
MBS Airport's new terminal

MBS International Airport (IATA: MBS, ICAO: KMBS, FAA LID: MBS), located in Freeland, Michigan, is a commercial and general aviation airport serving the nearby cities of Midland, Bay City, and Saginaw. It is included in the Federal Aviation Administration (FAA) National Plan of Integrated Airport Systems for 2017–2021, in which it is categorized as a non-hub primary commercial service facility.

MBS was formerly named Tri-City Airport or Freeland Tri-City Airport, reflecting the “Tri-Cities” nickname of the region. The airport was renamed MBS International Airport in 1994 (representative of its IATA airport code) to prevent confusion with other airports named "Tri-City Airport" across the United States. While owned by three municipalities, the IATA and FAA city name associated with the airport is Saginaw, i.e. the control tower is known to pilots as "Saginaw Tower".

The commercial airport is a special municipal body owned by Bay County and the cities of Midland and Saginaw. The airport's name is an initialism formed from the names of these three communities and it is governed by a nine-member commission made up of three members from each of them.

In October 2012, MBS opened a new $55 million six-gate terminal to replace the old three-gate terminal, which was built in 1965. The construction on this project was completed nearly a year ahead of schedule.

The old terminal, which sat empty since October 2012, was demolished in 2017.

MBS International Airport enjoyed a robust 2018 with passenger numbers up 13 percent, and the airport was poised to embark on a major rehabilitation of its main runway to ring in the New Year.

In 2022, a credential authentication technology (CAT) unit was installed at MBS' TSA checkpoint. Passengers insert their ID into the machine themselves, reducing a touchpoint during the security process.

The airport is a sponsor of the Great Lakes Loons, a minor league baseball team affiliated with the Los Angeles Dodgers.

== History ==
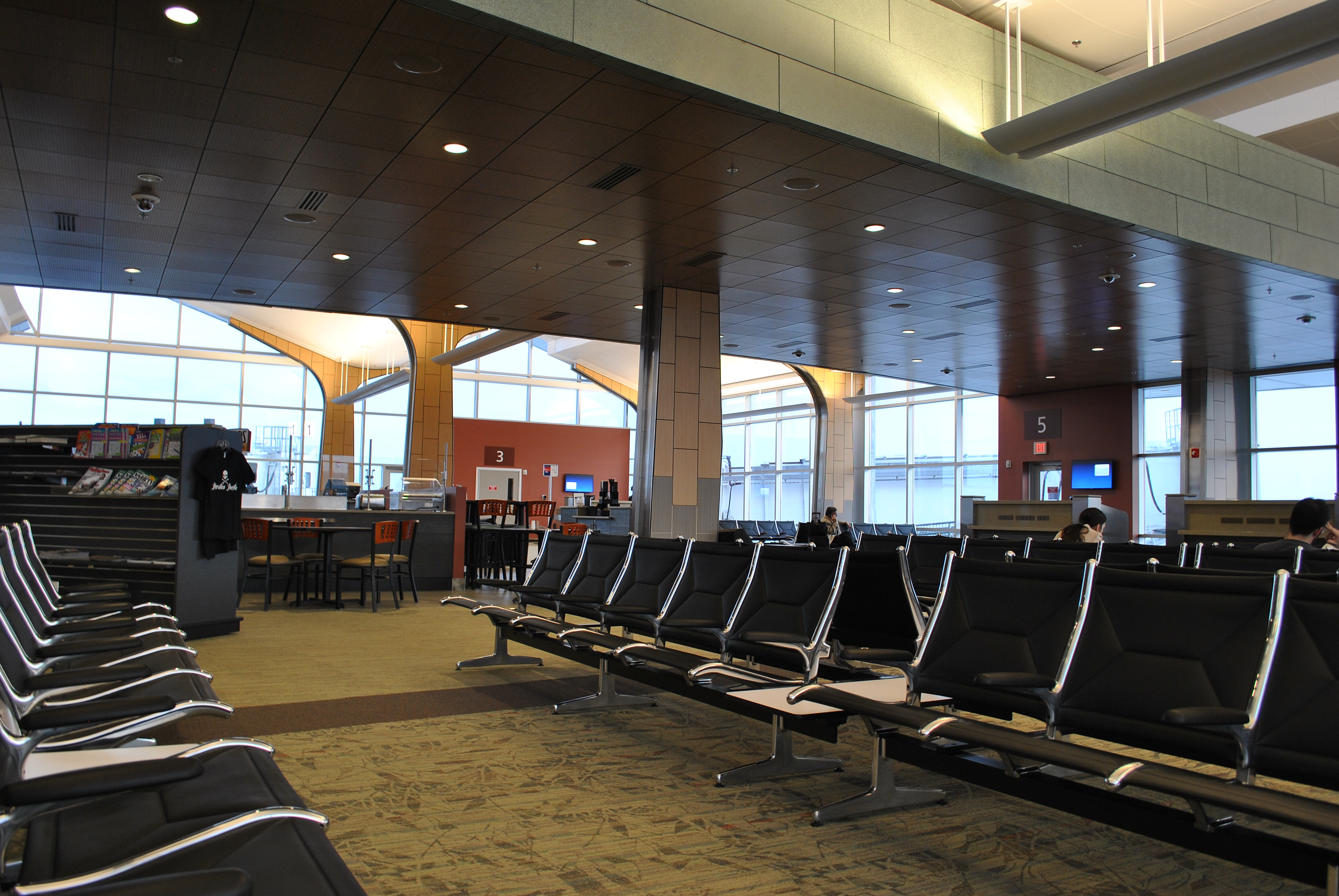
Current terminal boarding concourse

In March 1942, the cities of Saginaw, Bay City, and Midland purchased 640 acres (2.6 km^{2}) of land for the construction of an airport for $85,000 (equivalent to $1,700,000 in 2025), with the cost divided between each city based on their population. During World War II, the federal government commandeered the airport land to use as an army air base and prisoner of war camp. Construction of the runways, the purchase of additional land to expand the airport to 1,388 acres (5.62 km^{2}), and general improvements was performed by the federal government. After the war, the airport was turned over to the local governments. Civilian control of the airport resumed on June 1, 1946.

The airport operated with the old Army barracks being used as the administration building until January 30, 1955, when a new $190,0000 (equivalent to $2,300,000 in 2025) terminal building was completed. The current terminal on the north side of the air field opened on October 31, 2012. The 75,000 sq ft (7,000 m^{2}) terminal, which replaced an older terminal on the west side of the air field, was designed by RS&H and cost $55 million. The Airport Commission approved plans for the construction of the state-of-the-art passenger terminal in 2006, with construction beginning in 2008. Airport officials hope the terminal will bring more airlines and more competition to MBS.

Air Force One landed at the airport twice during the 2004 United States presidential election for nearby rallies in support of George W. Bush. It landed again on September 10, 2020 for a campaign speech by then President Donald Trump, and most recently on March 14, 2024 for a campaign visit by President Joe Biden. Air Force One also visited the airport in 1974 when then President Richard M. Nixon made a speech at the airport and arrived to give endorsement to James Sparling, a Congressional candidate. Air Force Two also made an appearance in 1992 when Vice President Dan Quayle spoke from a hangar the day before the 1992 presidential election.

== Facilities and aircraft ==
MBS International Airport covers 3,200 acres (13 km^{2}) and has two runways:

- Runway 5/23: 8,002 ft × 150 ft (2,439 m × 46 m), surface: asphalt
- Runway 14/32: 6,400 ft × 150 ft (1,951 m × 46 m), surface: asphalt

For the 12-month period ending December 31, 2017, the airport had 20,358 aircraft operations, an average of 77 per day. For the 12-month period ending December 31, 2021, the airport had 13,500 aircraft operations per day, or 37/day. This 2021 figure includes 67% general aviation, 25% air taxi, 8% commercial, and 1% military.

In December 2017, there were 23 aircraft based at this airport: 11 jet, 7 multi-engine and 5 single-engine airplanes, and 1 helicopter. In 2021, there were 19 aircraft based at the field: 8 jet aircraft, 6 multi-engine and 4 single-engine airplanes, and 1 helicopter.

The airport has an FBO operated by AvFlight. Besides fuel, it offers general maintenance, oxygen, courtesy and rental cars, conference rooms, crew lounges, snooze rooms, and showers.

=== Former airline service ===
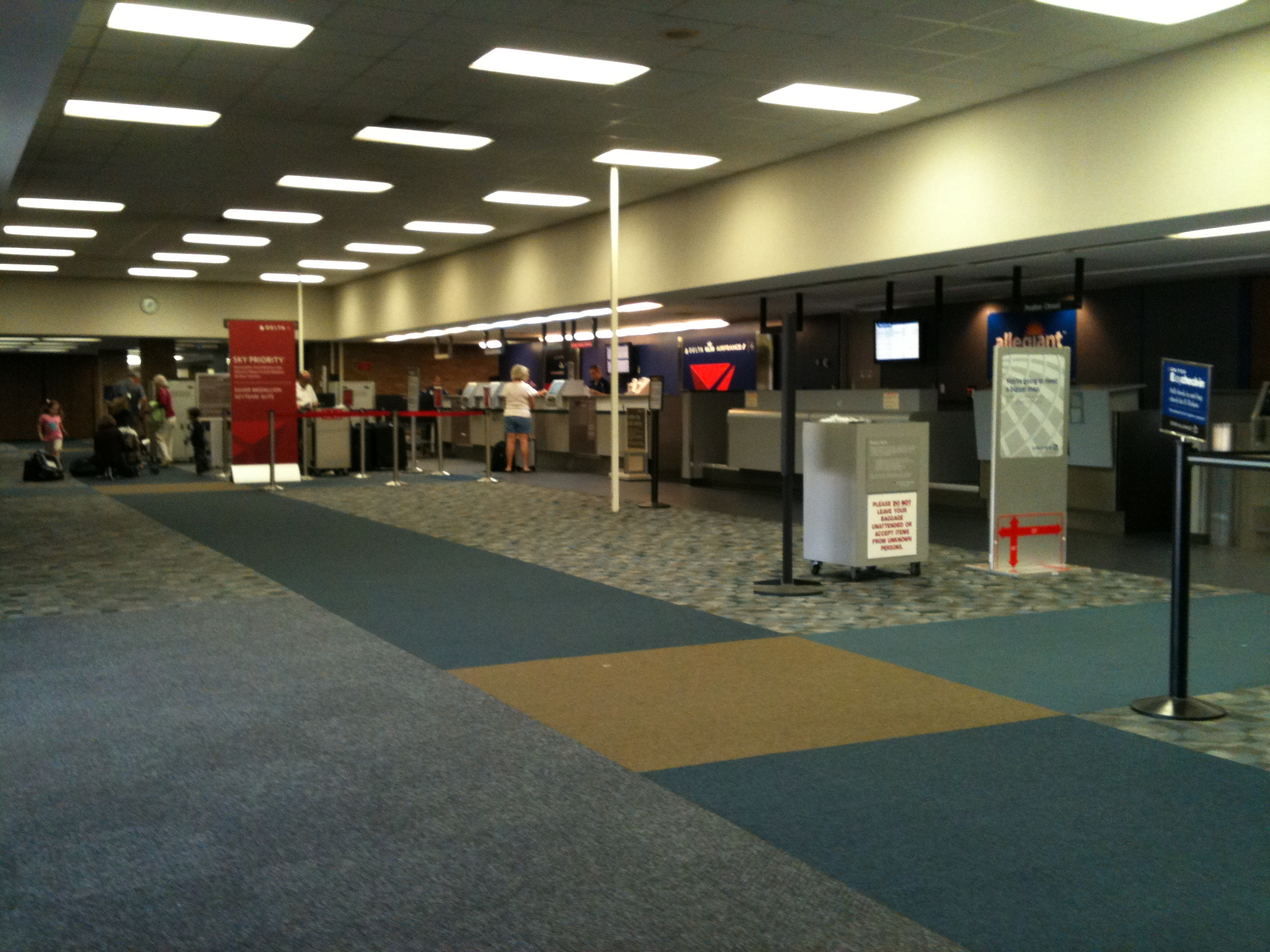
Ticketing area of the former terminal

The 1980s and 1990s saw a lot of growth at MBS. During this time, airline service expanded and many airlines began serving MBS.

- Air Canada (Operated by Air Ontario) served MBS with its only International destination, Toronto, Ontario, Canada.
- Allegiant Air began service to MBS in late 2011 with weekly MD-80 service to Orlando-Sanford though service was discontinued after less than a year. Allegiant Air began operating from Flint a few years later which is now an operating base for the airline.
- American Eagle Airlines operated Shorts 360 turboprop aircraft to Chicago O'Hare, as well as Lansing, Grand Rapids, Kalamazoo, and Traverse City. American left MBS in the late 1980s.
- Chicago Express Airlines, the now-defunct ATA Airlines carrier, served MBS in the early 1990s with daily service to Chicago Midway Airport using the Jetstream 31 turboprop aircraft.
- Delta Connection carrier Comair briefly linked MBS with its hub in Cincinnati using Embraer EMB 120 Brasilia, a 30-seat turboprop in the mid-1990s. Comair left MBS and later started service in Flint in 2001. Delta Connection returned to MBS in 2010 after their merger with Northwest Airlines.
- Continental Airlines provided mainline service in the 1980s to its hub in Cleveland using McDonnell Douglas DC-9 and Boeing 737 aircraft. Mainline service was downgraded to Continental Express service in the late 1980s using Beechcraft 1900 turboprop aircraft. Service to Flint and Chicago Midway also existed in 1992. The airline left MBS in the mid-1990s and returned in 2002. Service was dropped to Cleveland again in 2003.
- Republic Airlines began service to MBS in the 1960s linking MBS with Detroit using the DC-9 aircraft. During this time, Republic Express provided turboprop service to Flint, Grand Rapids, and Traverse City. Republic merged with Northwest Airlines in the 1980s, which became a major player at MBS. In their 20+ years at MBS, Northwest served Detroit and Minneapolis/St. Paul with a fleet of McDonnell Douglas DC-9 series aircraft along with the Boeing 727 and Airbus A319 & A320. Northwest Airlink, Northwest's regional brand, linked MBS to Flint, Lansing and Alpena throughout the 1980s with turboprop aircraft and eventually supported mainline Northwest with CRJ service to Detroit and Minneapolis. In 2008, Northwest operated a once daily nonstop to New York's LaGuardia Airport in New York City using a CRJ-200 regional jet. Northwest Airlines subsequently merged with Delta Air Lines in 2008. Delta Connection, Delta's regional brand, still serves MBS today with flights to Detroit.
- Skyway Airlines (The Midwest Express Connection) served MBS in the 1990s with service to Milwaukee, Wisconsin, using the Beechcraft 1900 turboprop aircraft. Skyway also tried service to Toronto, Flint, and Grand Rapids in the late 1990s. The airline pulled out in the late 1990s.
- United Airlines provided MBS with mainline service since commercial service was started. In the 1980s and 1990s, United linked MBS with Chicago using Boeing 737 and 727 aircraft. Service to Denver (via Stapleton International Airport), also existed in the 1980s. Mainline United left MBS in the 2001, and was replaced with United Express, which still serves MBS with service to Chicago's O'Hare International Airport using mostly 50-seat aircraft.
- US Airways began service to MBS in 1996, operating Fokker 100 and Boeing 737 aircraft to its former hub in Pittsburgh. Mainline service ended soon after, and US Airways Express assumed the Pittsburgh flights using the Beech 1900 and Saab 340 aircraft. US Airways suspended service to MBS just two days after entering Chapter 11 bankruptcy protection in late 2002. At the time it was the only city for US Airways to drop. Eventually, US Airways also left Flint, Lansing, Kalamazoo, and Grand Rapids, leaving Detroit as the only Michigan destination served by US Airways.

== Current operations ==
SkyWest Airlines runs ground services for United Express. United Express flies to Chicago O’Hare using mostly CRJ-200 aircraft. The CRJ-200 aircraft features 4 Economy Plus seats and 46 Economy seats.

DAL Global Services operates ground handling duties for Delta Connection at MBS, which features both CRJ7 and CRJ9 aircraft. CRJ7 aircraft have 9 First Class, 16 Delta Comfort+, and 44 Main Cabin seats. CRJ9 aircraft have 12 First Class, 20 Delta Comfort+, and 38 Main Cabin seats. Flights are operated by Endeavor Air and occasionally SkyWest.

== Airlines and destinations ==
=== Passenger ===
Airlines	Destinations
Delta Connection	Detroit
United Express	Chicago–O'Hare

Destinations map
Destinations from MBS International Airport

== Top destinations ==
Busiest routes from MBS (September 2025 – August 2026)
Rank	Airport	Passengers	Carriers
1	Detroit Metropolitan	71,550	Delta
2	Chicago–O'Hare	38,050	United

== Accidents and incidents ==
- On April 6, 1958, Vickers Viscount N7437, operating Capital Airlines Flight 67, stalled and crashed on approach. All 47 on board were killed. The cause was attributed to ice accretion on the horizontal stabilizer.
- On August 16, 1987, a Northwest Airlines MD-80, Northwest Airlines Flight 255, originated at MBS. After departing MBS, the flight dropped off and picked up passengers at Detroit Metropolitan Airport before crashing on takeoff en route to Phoenix, Arizona, killing 148 passengers and six crew members. There was only one survivor.
- On May 30, 2016, a Cessna 170 was substantially damaged on landing at MBS International. The pilot reported that after a long straight-in final approach, as he reduced power for the landing flare, the airplane dropped "flat" and bounced hard on the runway. The pilot further reported that he added power to cushion the touchdown after the bounce, but the right main landing gear had collapsed after the initial impact. Subsequently, the airplane veered off the runway to the left and nosed over. The probable cause was found to be the pilot's exceedance of the critical angle of attack during the landing flare, which resulted in an aerodynamic stall, hard landing, right main landing gear collapse, runway excursion, and nose over.
- On September 8, 2023, emergency crews first learned of issues on a twin engine Cessna 310 around 1 p.m. The airplane could not return to MBS, where it took off, for an unknown reason. The plane flew toward Harry Browne Airport in Saginaw and then to the Tuscola Area Airport in Caro airport, before making an emergency landing at Flint's Bishop International Airport.
- On September 21, 2023, a single-engine propeller aircraft was having issues with its landing gear. Upon landing on the runway, the landing gear collapsed. There were three passengers on board the plane, but no injuries were reported and the aircraft was announced to be stable.

== Transportation ==
Rental car services are provided by Hertz Rent A Car, Enterprise Rent-A-Car, Avis Car Rental, National Car Rental, and Budget Rent a Car. Various taxi and limousine services are available to passengers as well.

== Expansion ==
In July 2019, the FAA announced that MBS airport would receive $4.65 million for taxiway construction. This included $1.3 million in entitlement funding and $3.3 million in discretionary funding. The project added a second connection in and out of the terminal ramp, and was projected to improve efficiency.

In July 2023, the MBS Airport Commission announced that Jacksonville-based RS&H would serve as construction administrator for a major runway rehabilitation project. The Runway 14/32 project was expected to take just three months to complete, at a price point of $530,000.

== See also ==
- List of airports in Michigan
- Michigan World War II Army Airfields

== Historical photographs ==
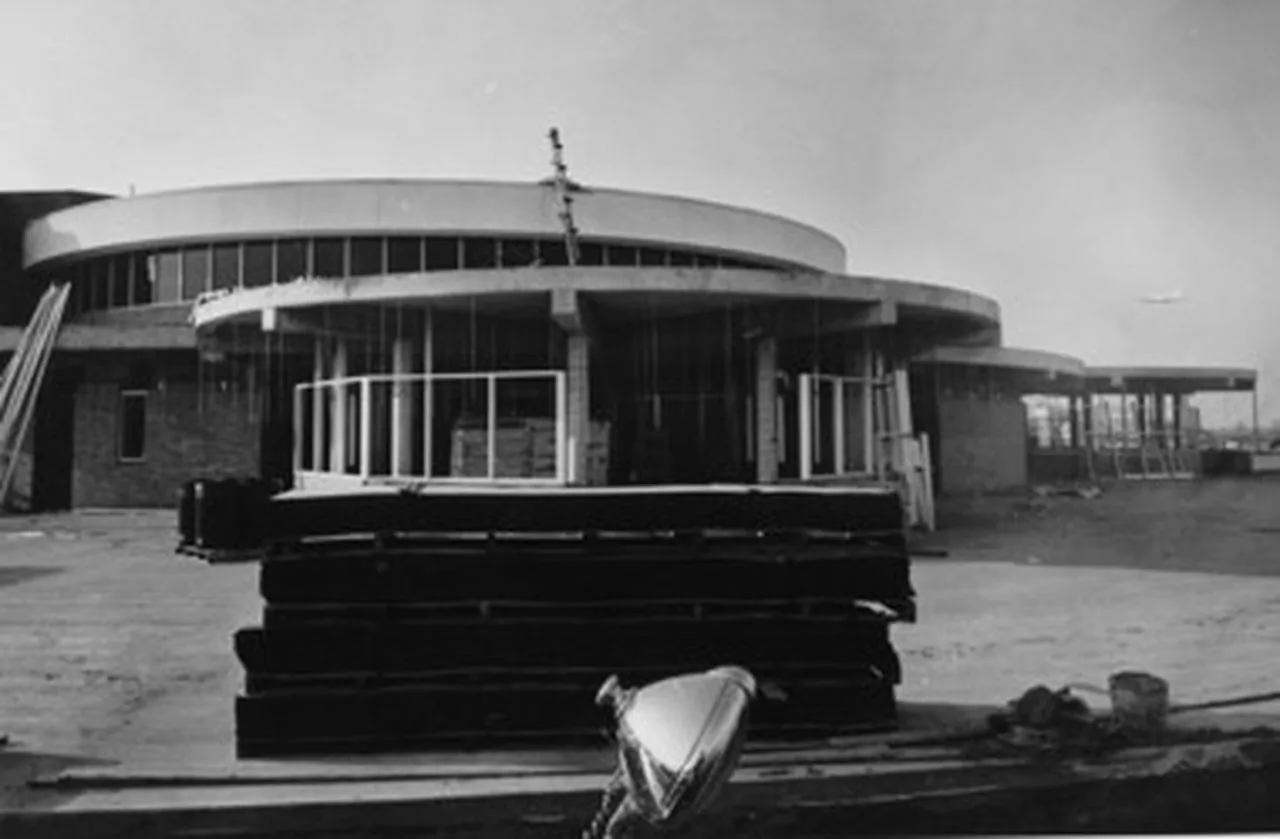
Construction started on Tri-City Airport

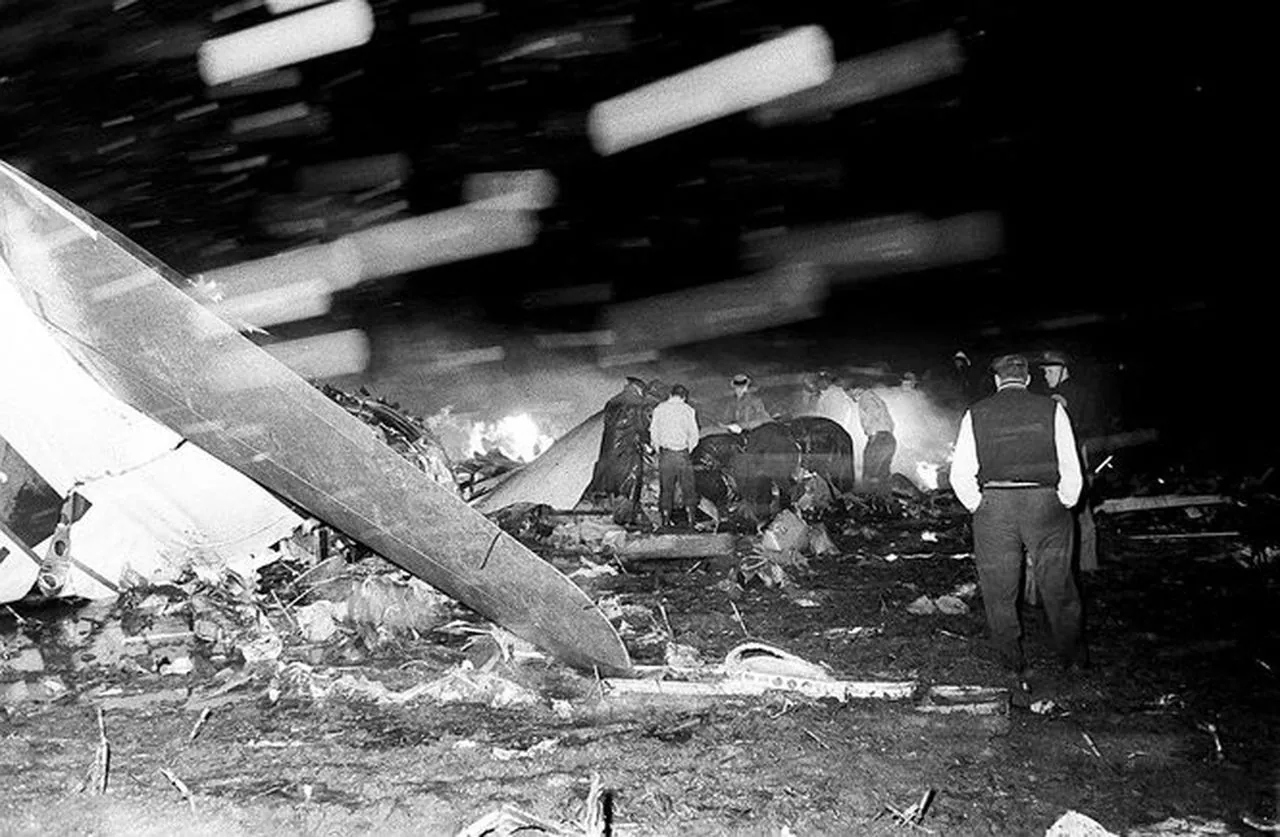
Responders search the wreckage of Capital Airlines Flight 67.

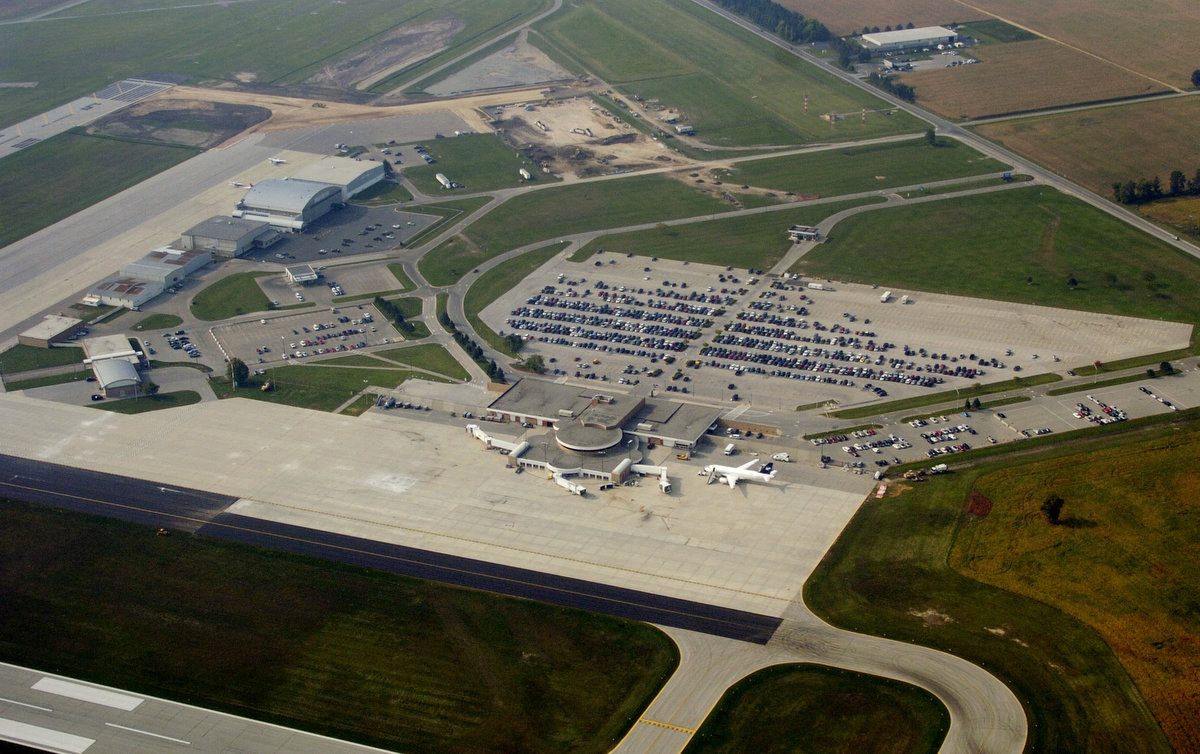
MBS former terminal building

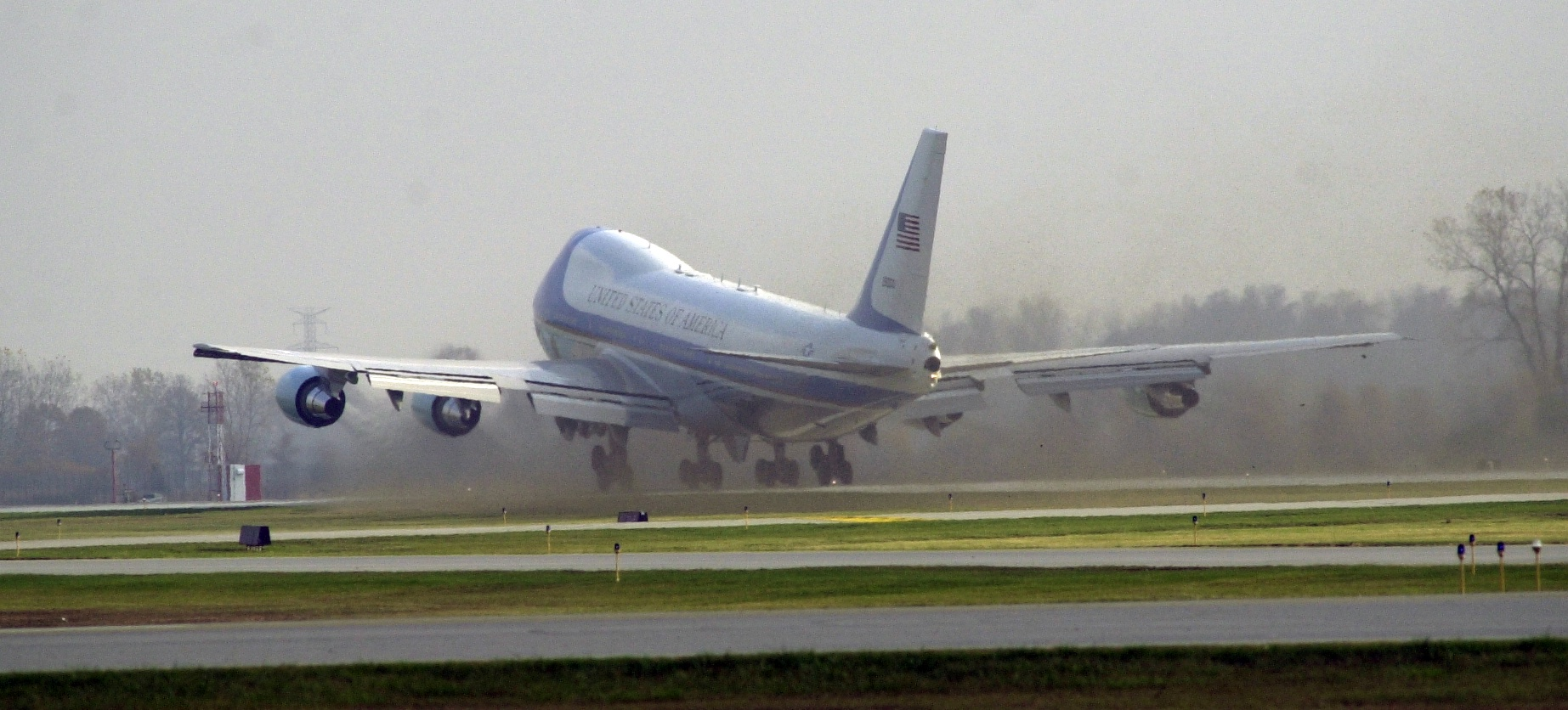
Air Force One landing at MBS (2004)

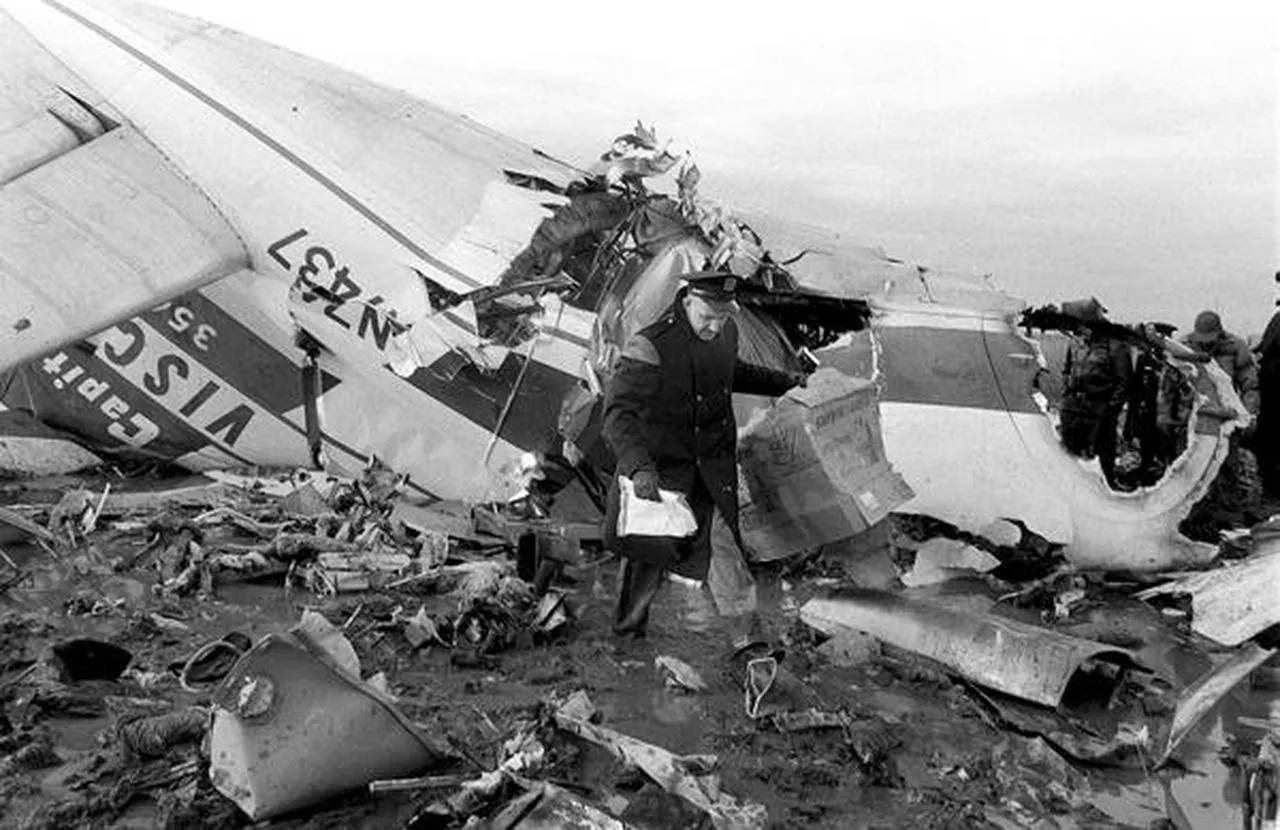
A first responder removes debris from the wreckage of Capital Airlines Flight 67.

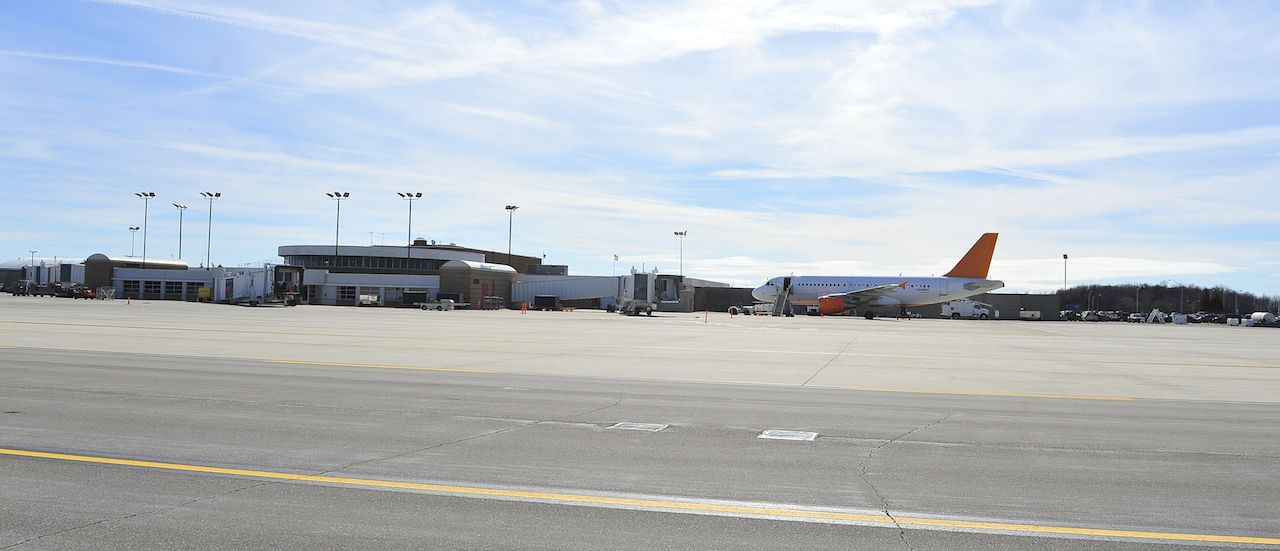
Plane parked at former terminal

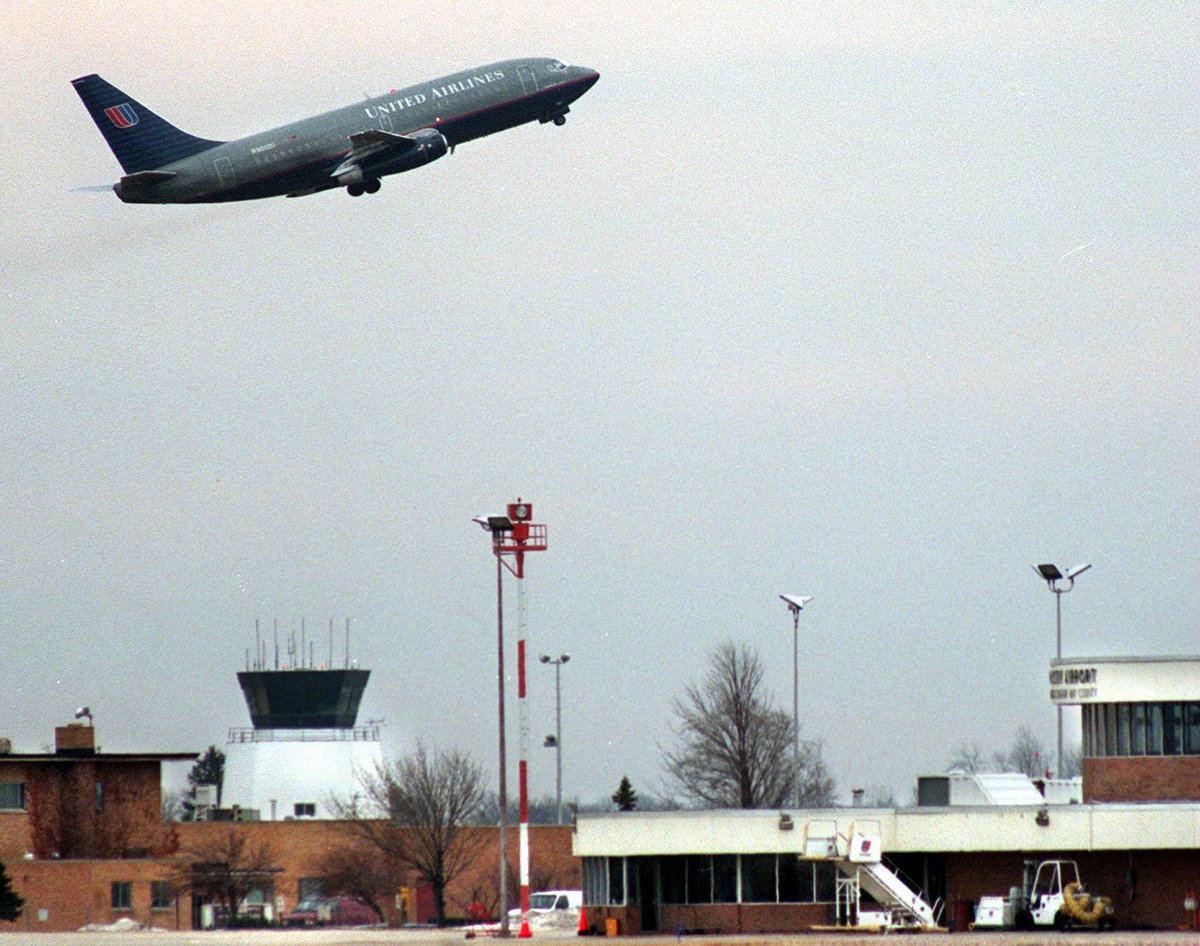
United Airlines flight taking off from MBS
