= Capital Airlines Flight 20 =

1960 aviation accident

Coordinates: 37°23′00″N 76°57′14″W

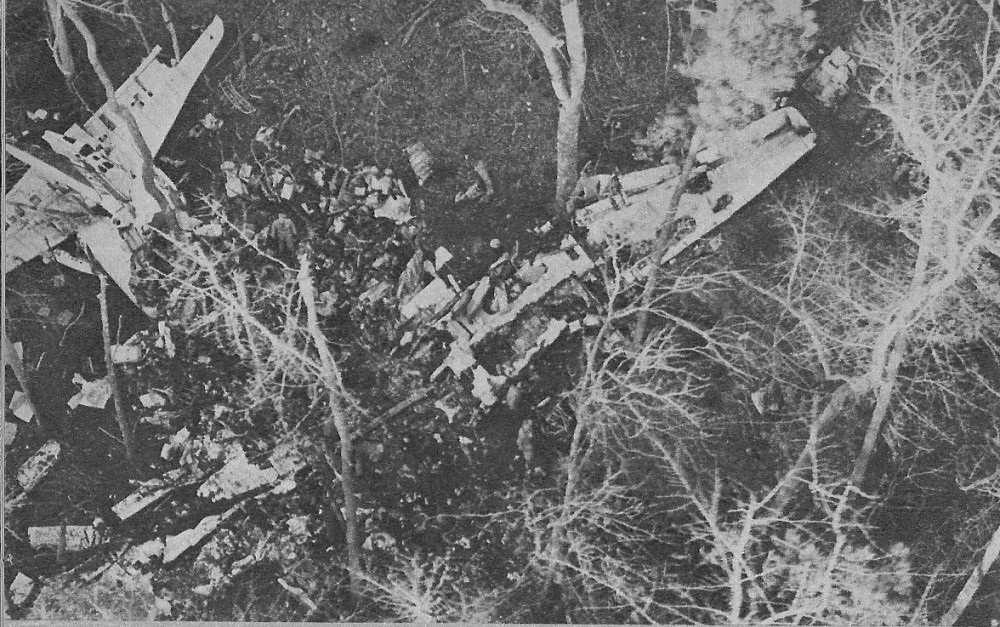
- Crash site

Accident
- Date: January 18, 1960
- Summary: Loss of control after total engine failure due to icing
- Site: Holdcroft, near Charles City, Virginia

Aircraft
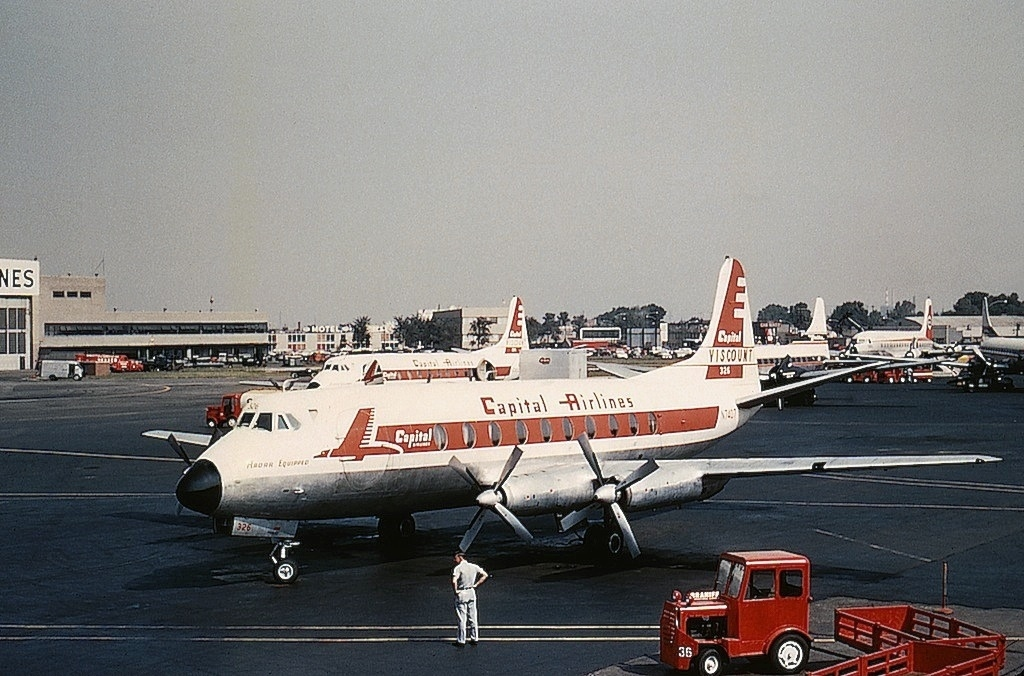
- A Capital Airlines Vickers Viscount similar to the one which crashed.
- Aircraft type: Vickers 745D Viscount
- Operator: Capital Airlines
- Registration: N7462
- Flight origin: Chicago Midway Airport, Chicago, Illinois, United States
- 1st stopover: Washington National Airport; Arlington County, Virginia, United States
- Destination: Norfolk Municipal Airport, Norfolk, Virginia, United States
- Passengers: 46
- Crew: 4
- Fatalities: 50
- Survivors: 0

Capital Airlines Flight 20 was a U.S. scheduled passenger flight from Washington, D.C. to Norfolk, Virginia. A Vickers Viscount flying the route crashed into a farm in Charles City County, Virginia, on January 18, 1960. The accident was the fourth fatal crash involving a Capital Viscount in less than two years; the first three were Capital Airlines Flight 67 (April 1958), Capital Airlines Flight 300 (May 1958) and Capital Airlines Flight 75 (May 1959).

== Accident ==
The plane was cruising at an altitude of 8,000 feet when it encountered icing. This caused two engines to fail. As the craft descended, the other two engines also failed, causing the propellers to autofeather. The crew tried and failed to restart the engines, and were unable to unfeather the propellers normally; they then put the plane into a dive in an attempt to force the propellers from their feathered position. Eventually they succeeded in restarting engine number four. They applied full power to this engine, which caused the craft to enter a circling descent until crashing into trees; at the time of impact it had almost no forward velocity. Five trees were driven through the fuselage, yet their trunks remained intact.

The plane burned for hours after the crash, the police said at the time. They also indicated that they had not been able to approach it to make an effort at recovering bodies. In addition, treacherous underfooting made the use of firefighting equipment almost impossible.

Heavy fog had closed many airports throughout eastern Virginia and had blanketed the area when the plane bearing 44 passengers and a crew of four came down on swampland near Sandy Gut, a tributary of the Chickahominy River about 30 miles southeast of Richmond. The plane was flying from Chicago to Norfolk – where the airport was open – by way of Washington. It had left Washington at 9:40 p.m. and crashed at 11 p.m. Capital Airlines in Washington identified the jet-prop aircraft's crew as Capt. James B. Fornasero, pilot; Philip Henry Cullom, first officer; and two hostesses, Diane Margaret O'Donnell and Brigitte Friede Helene Jordt.

— New York Times, Jan. 19, 1960

== Investigation ==
The crash was attributed to the fact that, as per airline policy, the pilots had delayed arming the engine ice protection systems even though they were flying in icy conditions; causing the 2 engines to lose too much power. Capital Airlines changed its emergency checklist after the crash, deleting the instruction that pilots were to descend to a warmer climate to relight the systems and instructing them that, provided that correct procedure was followed, the engine could be restarted at any height.
