= WGU-20 =

Emergency government civil defense preparedness radio station

PERki the dog, mascot of Public Emergency Radio

WGU-20 was an emergency government civil defense preparedness radio station in Chase, Maryland, United States, operated by the United States Defense Civil Preparedness Agency in the 1970s.

== Public emergency radio ==
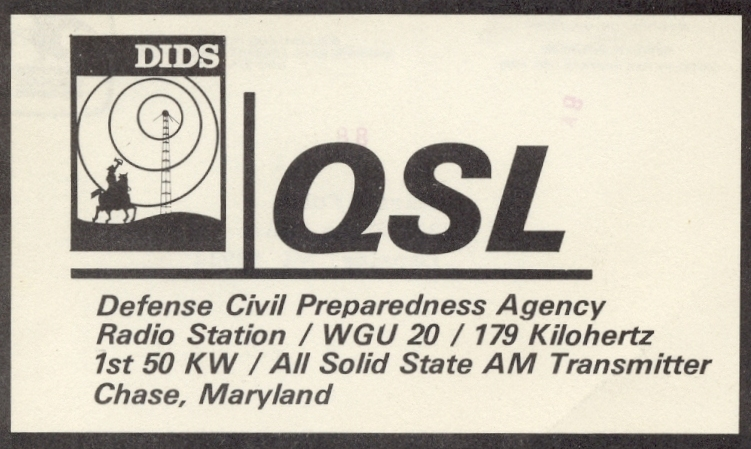
QSL card for WGU-20

Operating 24 hours a day on a longwave frequency of 179 kHz from Chase, Maryland, WGU-20's programming consisted of pre-recorded announcements (including weather reports) and time checks. The transmitter was situated at 39°21'3.4"N 76°20'44.7"W and used a single-mast antenna with a height of 219.45 metres (720.0 ft), which was demolished in 2011. The broadcast had the mechanical sound of early speech synthesis systems but the message could be clearly understood, with time ticks in the background and a continuous announcement akin to the speaking clock:

Good evening. This is WGU-20, a defense civil-preparedness agency station, serving the east central states with emergency information. Eastern Standard Time seventeen hours, twenty minutes, twenty seconds. Good evening. This is WGU-20, a defense civil-preparedness agency station, serving the east central states with emergency information. Eastern Standard Time seventeen hours, twenty minutes, thirty seconds. Good evening. ...

(The recording was changed to "good morning" or "good afternoon" at the appropriate times of day.)

Utilizing the world's first all-solid state 50 kilowatt radio transmitter built by Westinghouse Electric Corporation, the signal covered much of the East Coast of the United States. WGU-20 was something of a mystery initially, with thousands of ham radio operators and radio hobbyists speculating about the nature of the station, until a small news article in Popular Electronics magazine outlined exactly what WGU-20 was. Afterwards, reception reports (some from as far away as Texas) were sent a special QSL card featuring Paul Revere on a horse, raising the alarm.

== Decision Information Distribution System ==
WGU-20 was originally designed to be part of the Decision Information Distribution System (DIDS) that would be used to alert the public of an enemy attack (along the same lines as the then-current Emergency Broadcast System). As originally envisioned, many home devices, including radios, televisions, and even smoke detectors, would have inexpensive longwave receivers built into them, ensuring the attack message would get out. A longwave frequency was chosen because the extended groundwave signal it produced was supposed to be relatively immune to the effects of a nuclear detonation.

Built for US$2 million in 1973, WGU-20 was the prototype of ten DIDS "distribution stations". These were to operate 50 kW at 167, 179 and 191 kHz with 700-foot towers. Besides the Maryland site, candidate sites for distribution stations were Maynard, Massachusetts; Mount Joy, Pennsylvania; Gray, Maine; Morristown, Tennessee; Starke, Florida or Chiefland, Florida; Mazomanie, Wisconsin; Carthage, Texas, Marshall, Texas or Seagoville, Texas; Alcova, Wyoming or Riverton, Wyoming; Mendota, California or Selma, California; Winslow, Arizona; Hermiston, Oregon; and Wallula, Washington. The network was designed to be connected to the Safeguard Radar network, which would predict where missiles and bombers would attack and broadcast a warning that would tell the listener which areas to avoid.

These ten stations were to cover the 48 contiguous states. Alaska and Hawaii were to have special, unspecified arrangements. All DIDS stations would be partially below ground level and protected against blast and electromagnetic pulse effects.

The distribution stations would be activated by two "control stations" at 61.15 kHz, in Ault, Colorado and Cambridge, Kansas. These two stations would run 200 kW from 1,260-foot towers. Federal authorities would send the "go" signal by microwave and landline to the control stations. The ten distribution stations would then sign on and play taped messages to the public.

The DIDS system was never implemented, partly because it was too expensive and partly due to it being a one-way system with nothing going up the line. The job of attack warning in the US remained with the EBS (now the Emergency Alert System). However the 179 kHz frequency range was used by the government's Ground Wave Emergency Network (GWEN) which, instead of notifying the public of a war, was supposed to be a (nuclear war) survivable communications network linking various military installations.

== See also ==
- CONELRAD
- Continuity of government
- Emergency Broadcast System, American emergency warning system during the Cold War
- Four-minute warning, British public alert system during the Cold War
- Wartime Broadcasting Service, a service of the BBC that is intended to broadcast in the United Kingdom either after a nuclear attack or if conventional bombing destroyed regular BBC facilities in a conventional war.
