= Chase, Maryland =

Unincorporated community in Maryland, United States

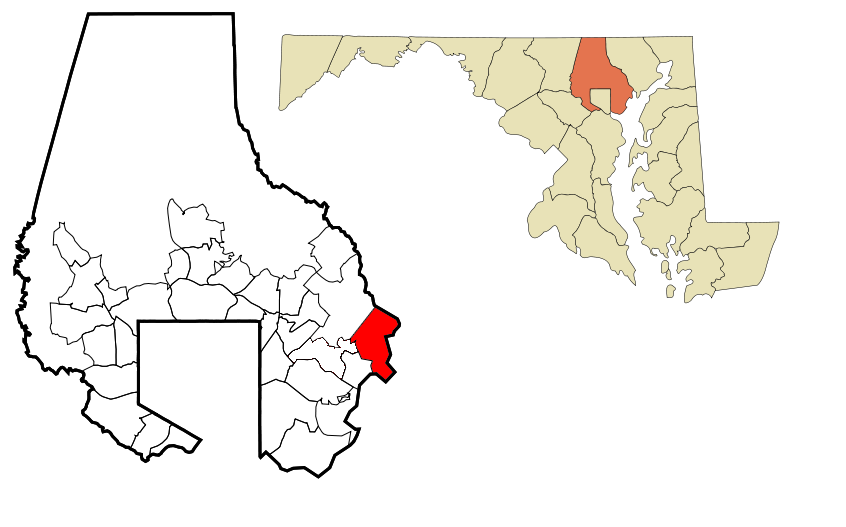
- Location of Chase in the State of Maryland
- Coordinates: 39°21′48″N 76°22′16″W
- Country: United States
- State: Maryland
- County: Baltimore
- Elevation: 26 ft (8 m)
- Time zone: UTC-5 (Eastern (EST))
  - Summer (DST): UTC-4 (EDT)
- ZIP code: 21220, 21027
- Area code: 410
- GNIS feature ID: 0589943

Chase is an unincorporated community in eastern Baltimore County, Maryland, United States.

== Geography ==
Chase is located at 39°21′48″N 76°22′16″W (39.3634413, -76.3710704). Chase is located on the waterfront of the Gunpowder River, Middle River, Dundee Creek, Saltpeter Creek, and the Chesapeake Bay. Nearby places include Middle River, Bowleys Quarters, Essex, and Aberdeen Proving Grounds.

== History ==
The community now known as Chase was founded as "Chase's Station" in 1850 as a stop for the Baltimore Railroad. Following the Civil War, Chase became populated by freed African American slaves, who established farms and residences along Eastern Avenue Extended. Founded later in the nineteenth century, the community of Bengies was similarly established as a rural African American community west of Chase along Eastern Avenue Extended. Eventually the two communities grew together and became known as Bengies-Chase, or simply Chase. From its inception until the mid-twentieth century, the primary employers were the Baltimore Railroad and local farms. Chase remained a primarily African American rural community until the mid-twentieth century, when Chase began to be used as a suburb of Baltimore City.

During World War II, Chase received a population boost following the opening of the Glenn L. Martin Company aircraft plant in Middle River.

On May 12, 1959, Capital Airlines Flight 75 crashed in Chase en route from La Guardia Airport to Atlanta Airport.

From 1949 to 1969, the United States Army used Carroll Island (a large island near Chase), and Graces Quarters (a large peninsula between the Dundee Creek and Gunpowder River) to test and dispose of chemical weapons, including: VX (nerve agent), sarin, mustard gas, incapacitating agents, and other lethal agents. These areas were considered to be a part of Aberdeen Proving Grounds and were the only part of Aberdeen Proving Grounds within Baltimore County. The chemicals at these sites were dumped in open pits, with no precautions taken against groundwater contamination and few records kept of exactly what was dumped where. In the 1980s, groundwater testing revealed contamination, and on February 21, 1990, the area was listed as one of Superfund's "most serious uncontrolled or abandoned hazardous waste sites." Some cleanup was completed in the 1990s but most remains unfinished. These sites remain off-limits to the public and undeveloped due to extreme contamination.

In the 1970s, WGU-20, a longwave radio station, was established by the Defense Civil Preparedness Agency (now the Federal Emergency Management Agency (FEMA)) near the Graces Quarters chemical weapons site. The purpose of the station was to alert the entire Eastern seaboard in the event of an enemy attack.

In the 1980s, Chase became a part of the zip code 21220 after a new, larger post office was built in Middle River to serve the entire area. The old zip code (21027) and post office remain for the purpose of P.O. boxes.

On January 4, 1987, Amtrak train 94 (the Northeast Regional, formerly the Colonial) crashed into three Conrail diesel locomotives as it passed through Chase. The Conrail engineer, Ricky Lynn Gates, and his brakeman, Edward "Butch" Cromwell, had both been smoking marijuana, which caused them to miss numerous warning signals. Fourteen passengers were killed, including the lounge car attendant and Amtrak engineer Jerome Evans, making this Amtrak's deadliest crash ever at the time. The crash became national news and led to new safety regulations and drug testing in the railroad industry. The crash also caught the attention of President Ronald Reagan, who honored some of the residents that lived by the accident scene for helping to evacuate unhurt passengers from the train.

On March 7, 2000, Joseph Palczynski murdered three people in an apartment complex in nearby Bowleys Quarters. The next day he murdered a fourth victim in Chase. Palczynski was raised in Chase, and being an outdoorsman was very familiar with the wooded areas surrounding the community. Thus, from March 7 to March 17 he sent the entire area into lock-down by hiding in the woods, evading police. He was finally killed by police on March 21 after a standoff in Dundalk.

Since the 1990s, efforts have been underway to revitalize Chase similar to those taking place in Essex and Middle River. These efforts have included the razing of half of the Formerly Tidewater Village & Whispering Woods (now Hopkins Point) apartment complex in the late-1990s, the opening of the MD 43 extension in 2006, and the addition of sidewalks along Eastern Avenue in 2007.

== See also ==
- Capital Airlines Flight 75
- WGU-20
