= Francis Scott Key Bridge replacement =

Bridge project in Baltimore, Maryland, US

- Graphic board showing a rendering of the design, February 2025
- Coordinates: 39°13′01″N 76°31′42″W
- Crosses: Patapsco River
- Locale: Baltimore metropolitan area, Maryland, U.S.
- Maintained by: Maryland Transportation Authority
- Website: keybridgerebuild.com

History
- Construction cost: US$4.3 billion to $5.2 billion (projected)
- Opened: December 2030; 4 years' time (projected)
- Replaces: Francis Scott Key Bridge

Location
- Interactive map of Francis Scott Key Bridge replacement

The Francis Scott Key Bridge replacement is a project to replace the Francis Scott Key Bridge in greater Baltimore, Maryland, United States. The 1.6-mile (2.6 km) bridge collapsed on March 26, 2024, after a container ship struck one of its piers. The southernmost crossing of the lower Patapsco River, the bridge was part of the Interstate Highway System and a major piece of the region's transport infrastructure: a well-trafficked part of the Baltimore Beltway (Interstate 695 or I-695) linking Dundalk in Baltimore County and the Hawkins Point neighborhood of Baltimore. It crossed the deep-water shipping channel leading to the Port of Baltimore, one of the country's busiest ports.

Six weeks after the collapse, officials at the Maryland Department of Transportation announced plans to replace the bridge by October 2028 at an estimated cost of $1.7 billion to $1.9 billion. The cost will be borne by the federal government under a December 2024 bill signed by President Joe Biden. In November 2025, Maryland officials announced that the projected cost had more than doubled, to an estimated $4.3 billion to $5.2 billion, and that the anticipated opening date had been delayed two years to late 2030. In April 2026, the state abruptly cut ties with the design contractor Kiewit. The executive director of the Maryland Transportation Authority Bruce Gartner attributed the decision to costs and impasse on design.

== Background ==
In the early morning of March 26, 2024, the Francis Scott Key Bridge collapsed after the container ship Dali struck one of its piers. Operated by the Maryland Transportation Authority (MDTA), the bridge was the outermost of three toll crossings of Baltimore's harbor, along with the Baltimore Harbor and Fort McHenry tunnels. Built for $141 million (about $743 million in 2024 dollars) the bridge carried an estimated 11.5 million vehicles annually, including many trucks carrying hazardous materials that are prohibited in the tunnels. It was a steel arch-shaped continuous truss bridge, the second-longest in the United States and third-longest in the world.

== Bridge replacement planning ==
=== Initial planning considerations ===
In an address later on the day of the bridge's collapse, President Joe Biden said that he would ask Congress to fund a replacement bridge. Two days later, on March 28, 2024, the federal government released an initial $60 million in emergency aid under the Emergency Relief (ER) Program of the Federal Highway Administration (FHWA) that is subsidized by the Highway Trust Fund. Transportation Secretary Pete Buttigieg also urged Congress to provide funding for a replacement bridge. Senate Minority Leader Mitch McConnell said that it was the federal government's responsibility to absorb the costs.

On April 5, 2024, the House Freedom Caucus issued a statement listing conditions for their support of funding for a replacement bridge, including that the federal government seek maximum liability from the shipping companies upfront, that funding only draw upon available federal funds and be offset with budget cuts, that various federal regulations be waived, and that the Biden administration lift its pause on liquefied natural gas exports. Ben Cardin, U.S. senator from Maryland, vowed to hold those responsible for the bridge collapse accountable, but argued against waiting for related litigation to be resolved and insurance claims to be approved, saying, "We're not going to delay opening our channel or rebuilding our bridge with the lengthy process that may take", with which Buttigieg agreed. On April 8, 2024, Maryland governor Wes Moore said he would talk with members of Congress the following week about funding a replacement bridge. At an April 10, 2024, hearing of the Senate Commerce Committee, ranking member Ted Cruz of Texas said the federal government "needs to help rebuild the bridge", but also argued that legal protections to protect taxpayers from the costs of litigation should be implemented and expressed concern about potential bureaucratic delays.

While some engineering professors suggested that replacing the bridge could take as long as 10 years and cost at least $350 million, a report issued by the Congressional Research Service (CRS) noted that replacement bridges can qualify for a Categorical Exclusion (CE) under the National Environmental Policy Act to accelerate regulatory review and project delivery. The report also noted that the I-35W Saint Anthony Falls Bridge that replaced the I-35W Mississippi River bridge was completed in 11 months with the help of a CE, while repairs to the Sunshine Skyway Bridge took five years to complete.

The CRS report notes that a replacement bridge project could be eligible to receive up to 80% of its funding from the FHWA ER Program since the bridge was a state highway, 90% if the expenses cause the state government to exceed its federal-aid highway program funds for the fiscal year, or 100% of the project cost if Congress makes an exception for the project from the ER Program rules (which Congress did for the I-35W Saint Anthony Falls Bridge), while any state funds received from an approved insurance claim would offset funding awarded from the ER Program. However, the ER Program has a $2.1 billion backlog of emergency relief reimbursements to states and only $890 million on hand. Policy scholars at the Eno Center for Transportation have suggested that a replacement bridge could qualify for funding under the Bridge Investment Program created under the Infrastructure Investment and Jobs Act.

On April 9, 2024, the Maryland congressional delegation announced that they would introduce a bill to make an exception to the ER Program rules for a replacement bridge. On April 11, 2024, Cardin and Maryland senator Chris Van Hollen introduced a bill in the Senate (S. 4114; referred to the Senate Environment and Public Works Committee), while Maryland representatives Kweisi Mfume, Steny Hoyer, Dutch Ruppersberger, John Sarbanes, Andy Harris, Jamie Raskin, David Trone, and Glenn Ivey introduced a bill in the House (H.R. 7961; referred to the House Transportation Committee).

On May 2, 2024, Maryland Department of Transportation officials said they planned to replace the bridge by October 2028 at an estimated cost of $1.7 billion to $1.9 billion.

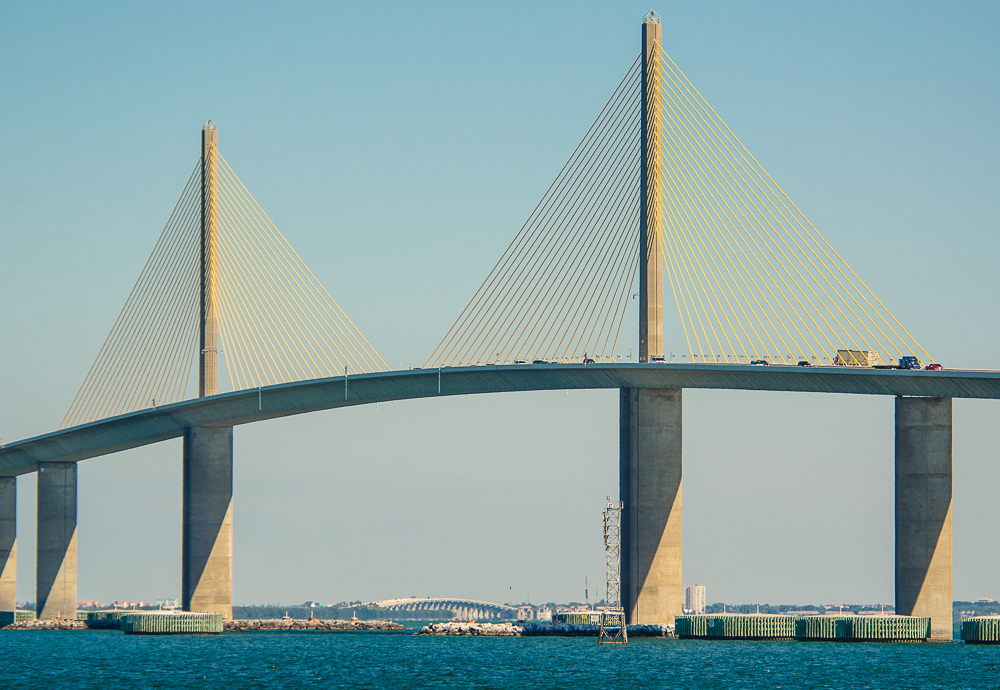
One firm proposed a cable-stayed bridge like the replacement for Florida's Sunshine Skyway Bridge, the original bridge having suffered a similar fate.

On May 3, 2024, Webuild, a European-based construction firm with a U.S. subsidiary, became the first engineering firm to submit a design proposal to the Maryland officials. The proposal called for a cable-stayed bridge with central support cables, similar to the Sunshine Skyway Bridge in St. Petersburg, Florida; it would have a central span of 2,300 feet (700 m), twice that of the old bridge, and rise 213 feet (65 m), compared to the previous 185 feet (56 m).

More than 1,700 contracting firms signed up for a May 7, 2024, MDTA industry briefing on the project.

=== Request for proposals ===
In May 2024, MDTA officials issued a request for proposals to build the new bridge. The desired completion date remains the fourth quarter of 2028.

=== Design work ===
In August 2024, the Maryland Transportation Authority awarded a $73 million contract to Kiewit for pre-construction and design work. The Baltimore Sun described it as a "down payment on what is expected to be at least a $1.7 billion project". State officials cited Kiewit's work for MDTA and similar projects around and beyond the United States.

In November, 2025, Maryland officials announced that the anticipated opening date had been delayed two years to late 2030, and the projected cost had more than doubled, to an estimated $4.3 billion to $5.2 billion. The original bridge—shorter, lower, and more susceptible to failure—was built for an inflation-adjusted $584 million.

Kiewit's contract with the state of Maryland required the state to negotiate first with Kiewit on an option on phase two construction. In April 2026, state and federal transportation officials announced that they would part ways with Kiewit at the end of its design and planning contract, citing high cost estimates.

== Demolition and construction ==
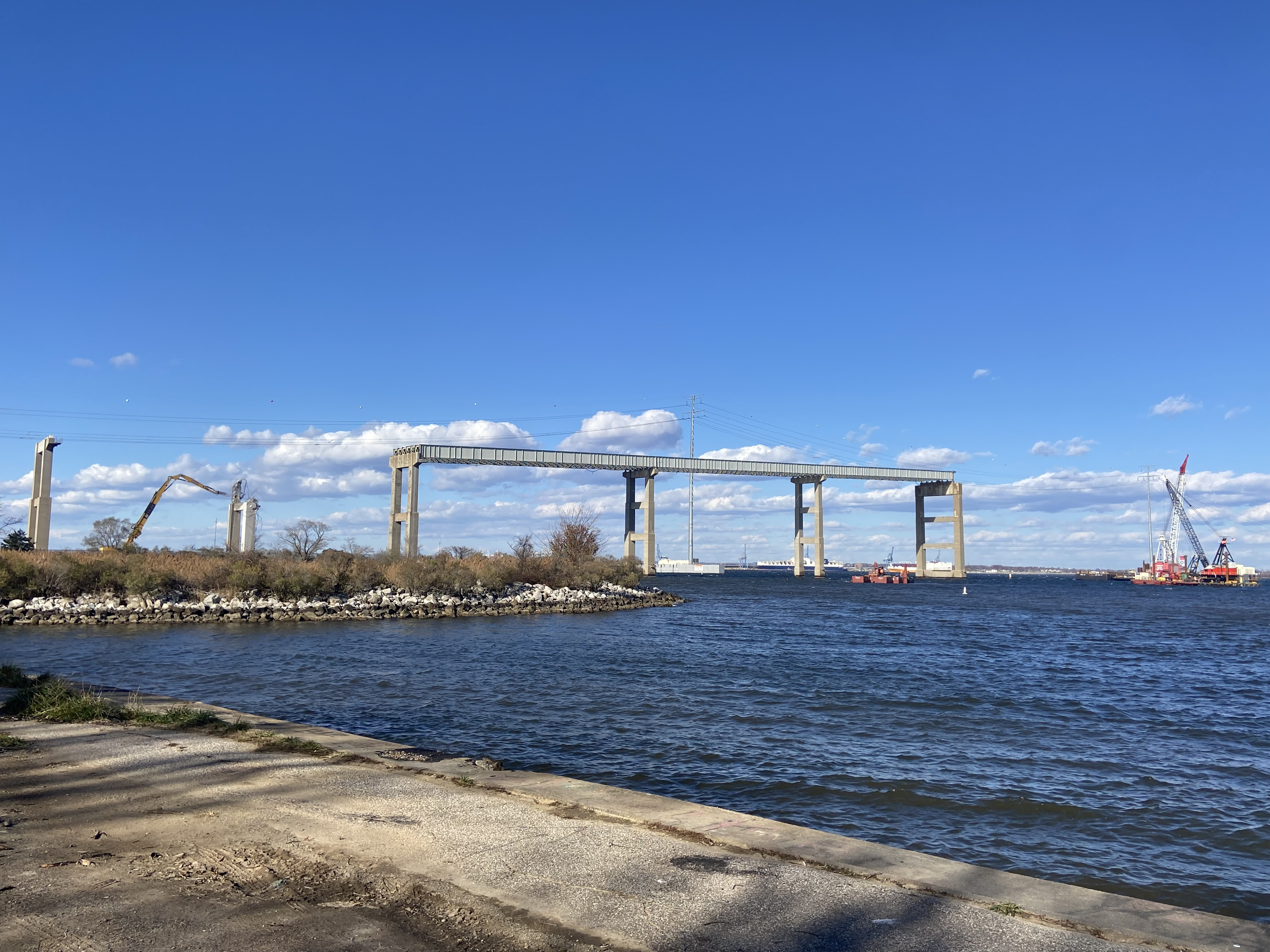
Demolition of the bridge on November 16, 2025

Demolition of the original bridge's remaining ramps, piers, and aboveground structures was originally planned for 2024. But on November 14, 2024, MTA officials pushed it to 2025 and said it was expected to take about 10 months.

Demolition of the remaining bridge began in July 2025 and was expected to take nine months. In November 2026, Maryland officials agreed to a $38.6 million contract with the Joseph B. Fay Company to raze the remnants of the bridge.

== Design ==
In August 2024, MDTA officials said that the new bridge will be built on the same route as the old bridge.

It will be slightly wider to accommodate today's federal bridge code, which requires wider shoulders. The new bridge will have two 12-foot lanes in each direction, 10-foot-wide outside shoulders and 4-foot-wide inside shoulders per direction of travel.

On February 4, 2025, the Maryland Transportation Authority unveiled a preliminary design for a cable-stayed bridge, Maryland's first. It is to have two travel lanes in each direction, with a 1,600-foot (490 m) main span and 600-foot (180 m) supporting towers. Its clearance over the shipping channel will be at least 230 feet (70 m), 45 feet (14 m) higher than the old bridge's 185 feet (56 m). The bridge will be longer so the roadway can reach the increased height with an acceptably gradual incline.

A comparison of the old and new bridges:

Feature	Old bridge	New bridge
Opening year	1977	2030 (scheduled)
Bridge type	Continuous truss	Cable stayed
Vertical clearance	185 feet (56.4 m)	230 feet (70.1 m)
Maximum height	358 feet (109.1 m) (truss)	602 feet (183.5 m) (towers)
Total bridge length	1.7 miles (2.7 km)	2.2 miles (3.5 km)
Main span length	1,209 feet (368.5 m)	1,665 feet (507.5 m)
Total span length	2,643 feet (805.6 m)	3,365 feet (1,025.7 m)
Shipping channel width	700 feet (213.4 m)	1,000 feet (304.8 m)

== See also ==
- List of bridge types
