= Thruway =

Thruway may refer to:

- Amtrak Thruway, an inter-city busing service operated by Amtrak
- Harbor Tunnel Thruway, a freeway in the vicinity of Baltimore, Maryland, United States
- New York State Thruway, a toll highway in New York, United States
- In its most generic sense, another term for controlled-access highway
