= Francis Scott Key Bridge (Baltimore) =

Bridge in Maryland, U.S. (1977–2024)

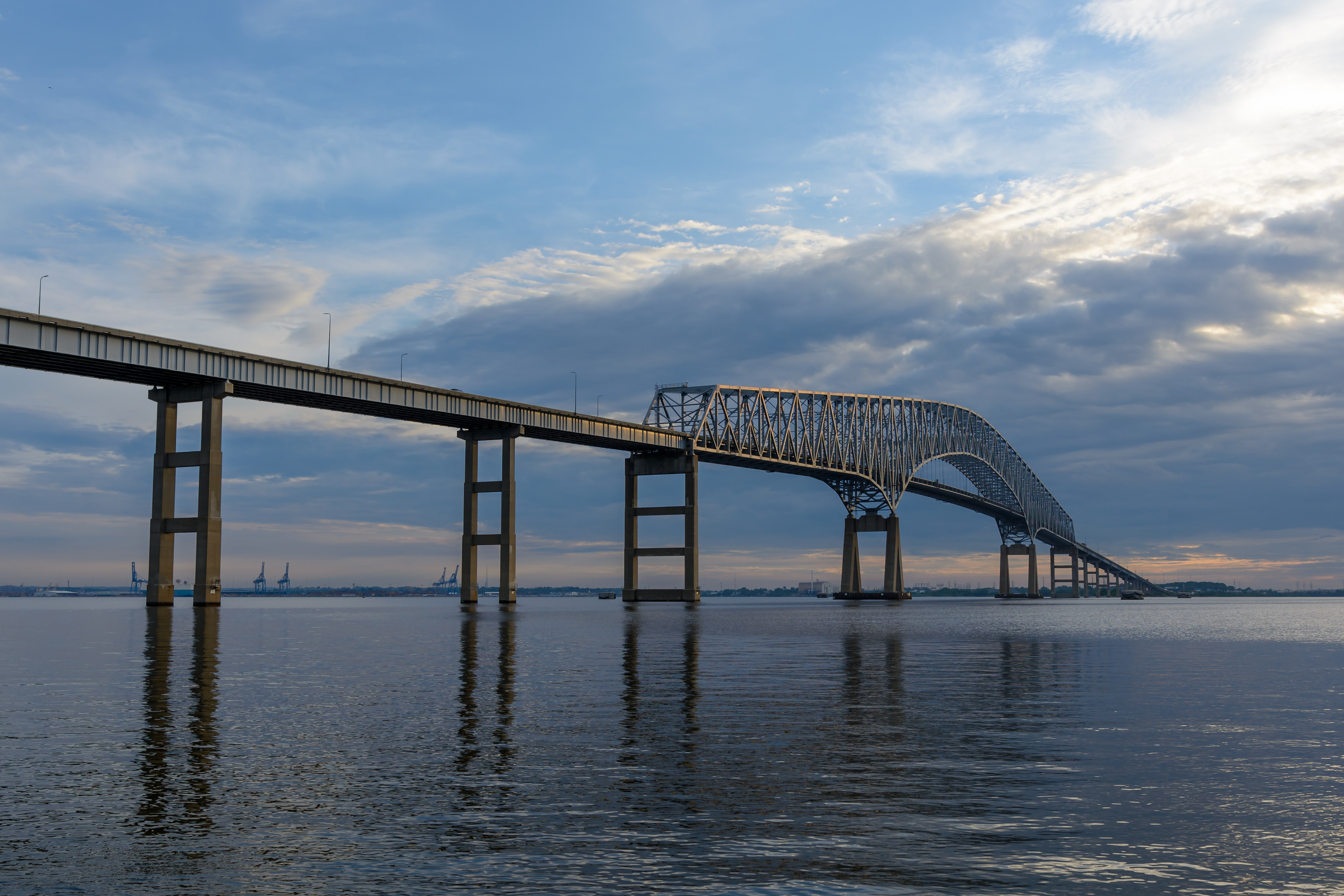
- View from Fort Armistead Park in 2015
- Coordinates: 39°13′01″N 76°31′42″W
- Carried: 4 lanes of I-695 Toll
- Crossed: Patapsco River
- Locale: Baltimore metropolitan area, Maryland, U.S.
- Maintained by: Maryland Transportation Authority
- ID number: 300000BCZ472010
- Website: web.archive.org/web/20240324212456/mdta.maryland.gov/Toll_Facilities/FSK.html

Characteristics
- Design: Steel arch-shaped continuous through truss bridge
- Material: Steel
- Total length: 8,636 feet (2,632.3 m; 1.6 mi)
- Width: 58 feet (18 m)
- Height: 358 feet (109 m)
- Longest span: 1,200 feet (366 m)
- Clearance below: 185 feet (56 m)

History
- Designer: J. E. Greiner Company
- Construction start: 1972; 54 years ago
- Opened: March 23, 1977; 49 years ago
- Collapsed: March 26, 2024; 2 years ago

Statistics
- Daily traffic: 34,000
- Toll: Suspended (Was $1.40–45)

Location
- Interactive map of Francis Scott Key Bridge

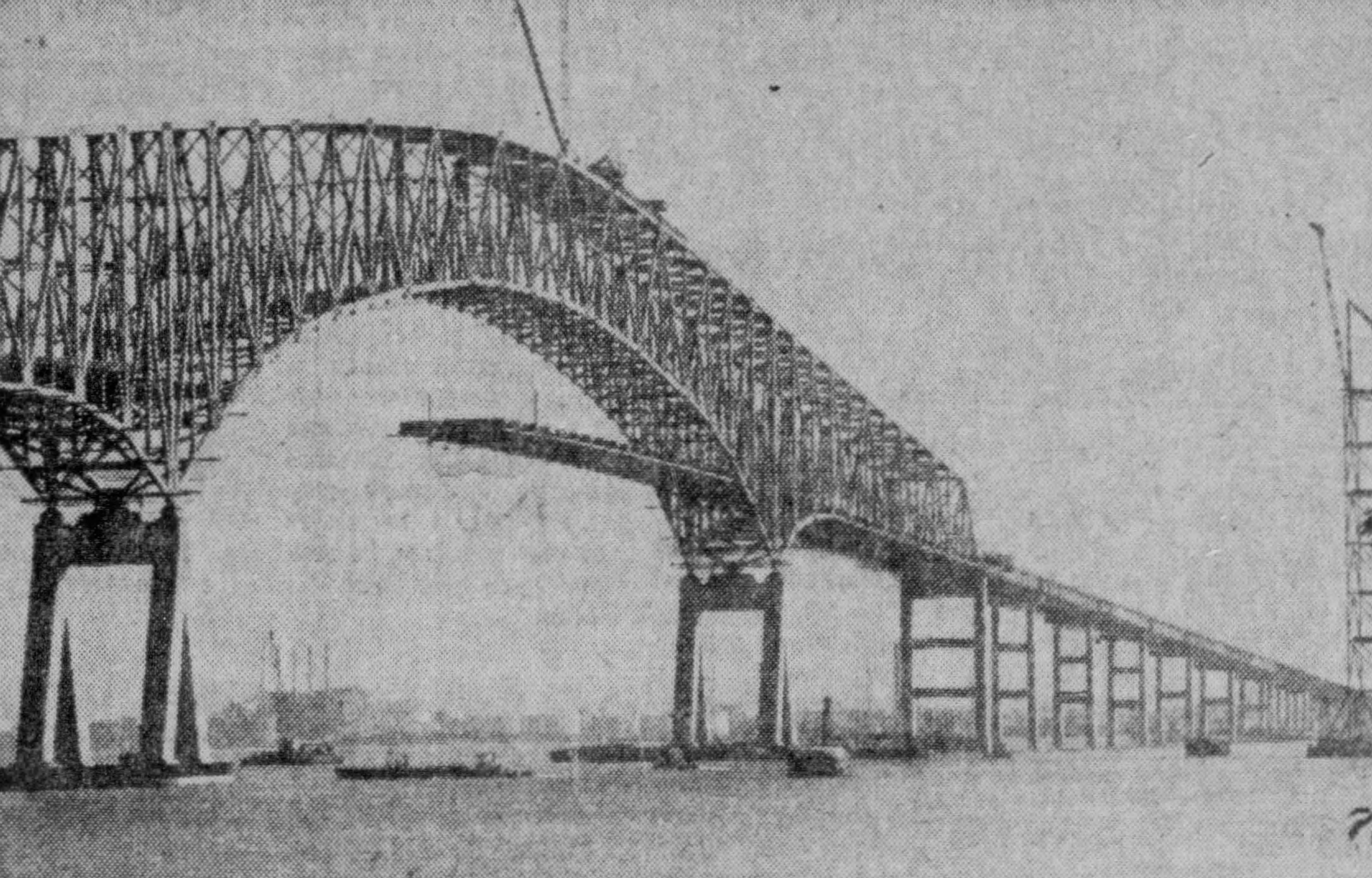
The Francis Scott Key Bridge under construction in 1976

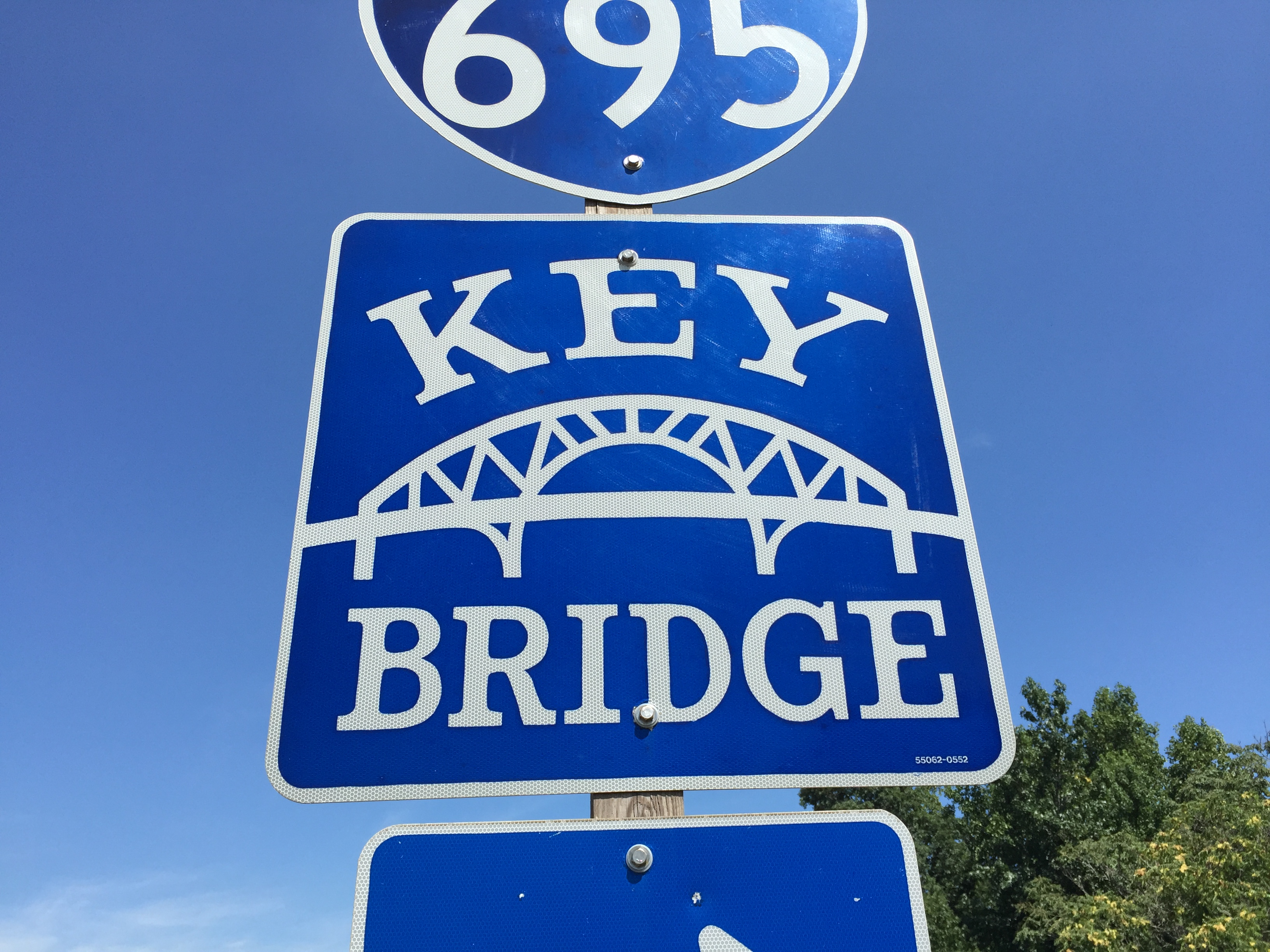
Sign for the Key Bridge used on approach roads

The Francis Scott Key Bridge (informally, Key Bridge or Beltway Bridge) was a highway bridge in Maryland that crossed the lower Patapsco River and outer Baltimore Harbor/Port. The bridge opened on March 23, 1977, connecting the Baltimore Beltway (Interstate 695 or I-695) between Dundalk and Hawkins Point.

Initially named the Outer Harbor Crossing, the bridge was renamed in 1976 for poet Francis Scott Key, who wrote the lyrics to "The Star-Spangled Banner", the U.S. national anthem. It was the second-longest bridge in the Baltimore metropolitan area, after the Chesapeake Bay Bridge, at 8,636 feet (2,632 m). Francis Scott Key Bridge's main span of 1,200 feet (366 m) was the third-longest of any continuous truss in the world.

Operated by the Maryland Transportation Authority (MDTA), the bridge was the outermost of three crossings of Baltimore's harbor, along with the Baltimore Harbor tunnel and the Fort McHenry tunnel, all of which require tolls for passage. The bridge carried an estimated 11.5 million vehicles annually, including trucks carrying hazardous materials prohibited in the tunnels. It completed the last gap in I-695's circuit of the city, although the bridge roadway was officially a state road: the unsigned Maryland Route 695.

On March 26, 2024, the main span collapsed when the container ship MV Dali struck one of its piers, killing six workers who were doing maintenance on the bridge at the time. As of March 2026, the remnants are being demolished and a replacement bridge is being built at the site, with completion scheduled in December 2030.

== History ==
=== Construction ===
By the early 1960s, the Baltimore Harbor Tunnel (Interstate 895), the first crossing of Baltimore's Harbor, had reached its traffic capacity. The Maryland State Roads Commission concluded there was a need for a second harbor crossing. They began planning another single-tube tunnel under the Patapsco River, downstream and to the southeast, between Hawkins Point and Sollers Point in the outer harbor. In October 1968, this Outer Harbor Tunnel project received financing through a $220 million bond issue (equivalent to $2 billion in 2025) that also funded the twinning of the Chesapeake Bay Bridge. But when the bids to build the tunnel were opened in July 1970, they were substantially higher than expected. So officials drafted alternative proposals, including a four-lane bridge, which had the advantage of providing a route across Baltimore Harbor for vehicles carrying hazardous materials barred from tunnels.

In April 1971, the Maryland General Assembly approved the bridge project. The United States Coast Guard issued a bridge permit in June 1972, replacing the earlier approval of the tunnel by the Army Corps of Engineers. Baltimore engineering firm J. E. Greiner Company was selected as the primary design consultant, with the side approaches being handled by New York City's Singstad, Kehart, November & Hurka in joint venture with Baltimore Transportation Associates, Inc. The construction was to be performed by the John F. Beasley Construction Company with material fabricated by the Pittsburgh-Des Moines Steel Co.

Construction of the Outer Harbor Bridge began in 1972, several years behind schedule and $33 million over budget. Each of the bridge's main piers—Nos. 17 and 18—was protected by dolphins upstream and downstream, each with a 25-foot-diameter sheet pile filled with tremie concrete with a reinforced concrete cap. These piers also had 17-foot fender system: crushable thin-walled concrete boxes of 100 by 84.5 feet, clad with timber members and steel plate at the base.

In 1976, as construction went on, the facility was named for Francis Scott Key, the author of "The Defence of Fort M'Henry", the poem upon which "The Star-Spangled Banner" is based. Key was inspired to write the poem after witnessing the bombardment of Fort McHenry during the Battle of Baltimore in September 1814. Key had been aboard an American truce ship with the British Royal Navy fleet in Baltimore Harbor near Sollers Point; the approximate location is within 100 yards (91 m) of the bridge and marked by a buoy in the colors of the U.S. flag.

=== Operation ===
The Key Bridge opened to traffic on March 23, 1977. The bridge project was 1.6 miles (2.57 km) in length with 8.7 miles (14.00 km) of approach road. In 1978, the bridge received an Award of Merit from the American Institute of Steel Construction in the Long Span category. In 1980, a cargo ship collided with the Key Bridge, but the bridge was relatively undamaged.

The bridge opened with four lanes, but its approaches were two lanes to reduce costs. The south approach was widened in 1983. A project for the north approach was completed in 1999 after several years of delays.

In July 2013, the toll for cars was $4. The bridge was part of the E-ZPass system and its toll plaza included two dedicated E-ZPass lanes in each direction. On October 30, 2019, the bridge's tolling went fully cashless; drivers paid via E-ZPass or video tolling. At the time of the collapse, tolls ranged from $1.40 for those under the commuter plan to $45 for vehicles exceeding five-axles that used the video tolling service.

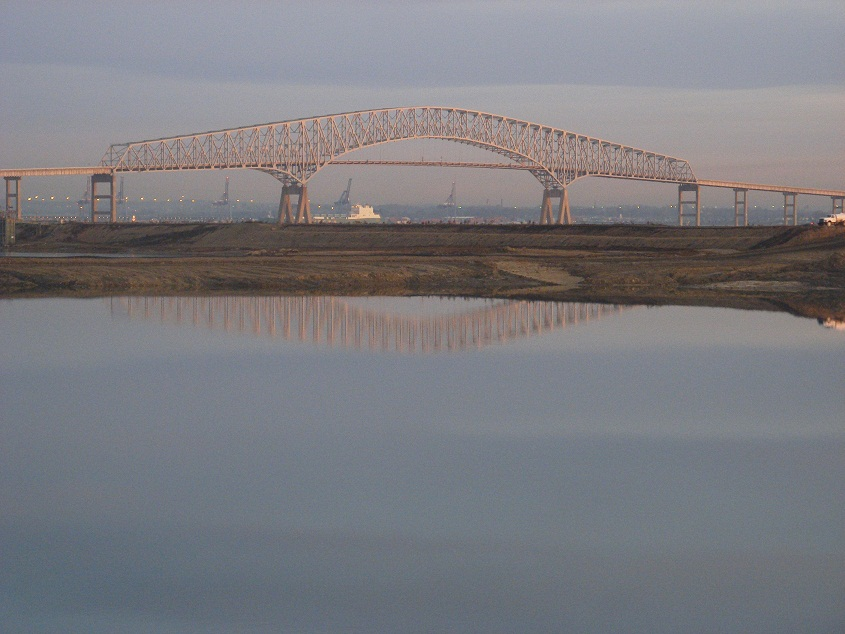
Key Bridge with Baltimore in the background, viewed from Cox Creek Industrial Park, in northeast Anne Arundel County, November 2011

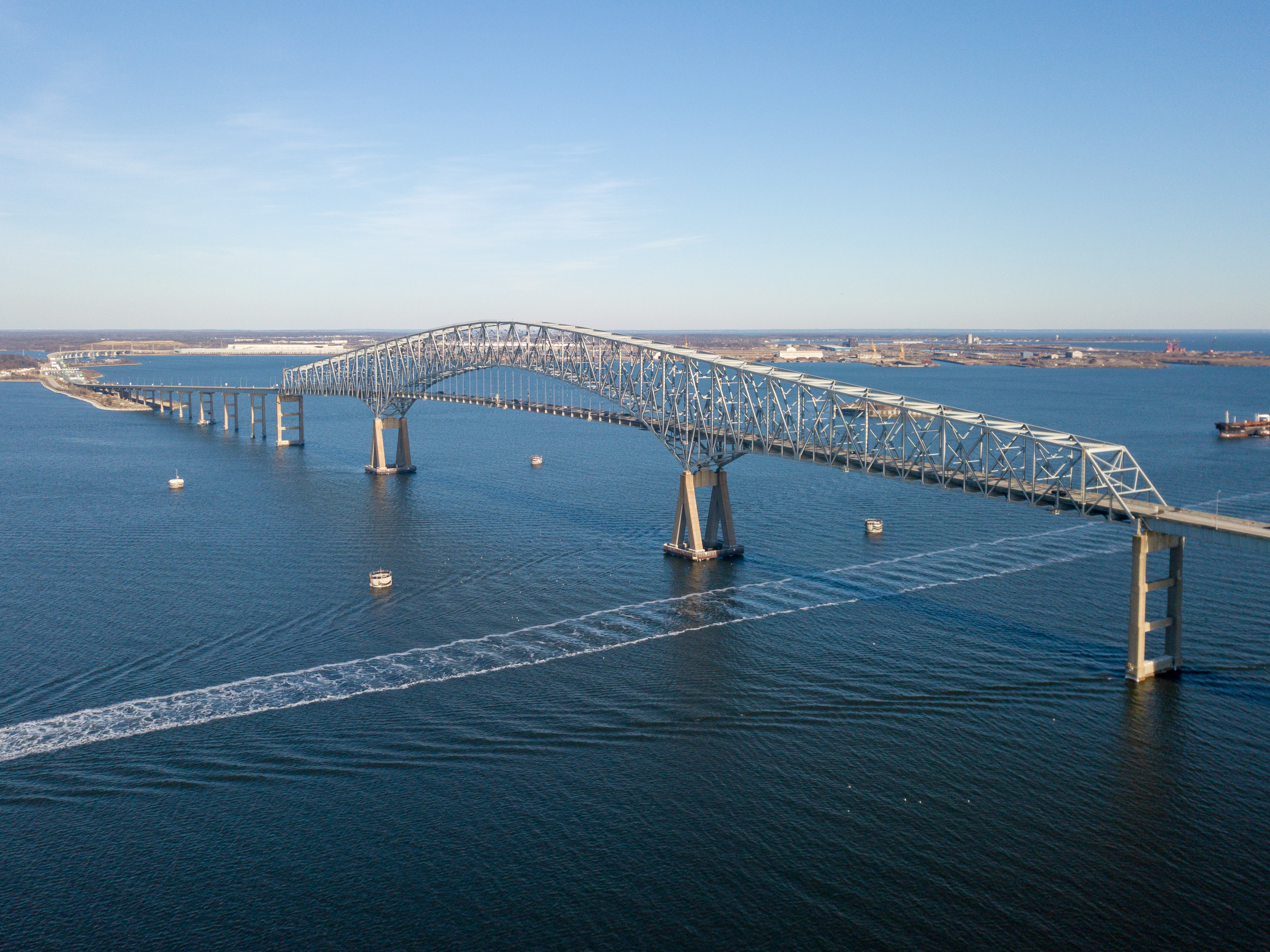
Key Bridge looking to the northeast with Sparrows Point and the Bethlehem Steel Corporation steel mill and shipyards of southeast Baltimore County in the distance, February 2018

Driving on the inner loop (westbound) across the bridge, November 2023

=== Collapse ===
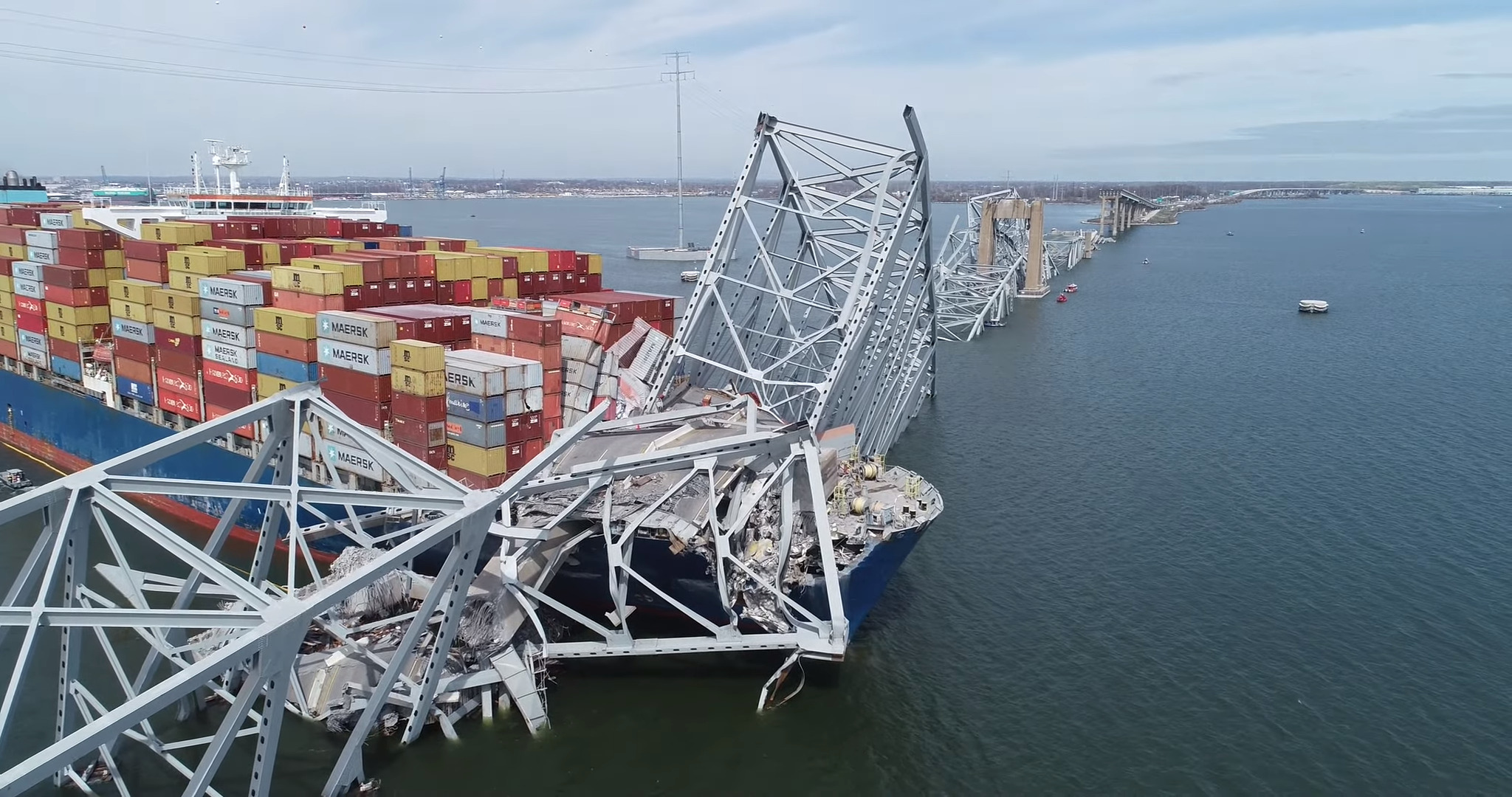
Ten hours after the collapse, remnants of the bridge's superstructure and roadway rest on Dali's bow.

On March 26, 2024, at 01:28 EDT (05:28 UTC), the main spans of the bridge collapsed after the Singapore-registered container ship MV Dali lost power and collided with the southwest supporting pier of the main truss section. The NTSB noted that the Key Bridge was built before the introduction of redundant support structures, which are widely used in modern bridges and would have prevented such a collapse.

Members of an eight-person maintenance crew working on the bridge are believed to be the only people injured or killed in the disaster. Six bodies were recovered and two people were rescued: one uninjured and the other transported to a hospital in critical condition. A mayday distress call sent by the ship's crew just before the collision led police and bridge workers to halt traffic onto the bridge, likely saving many lives.

The collapse, which blocked the Patapsco shipping channel, immediately halted almost all passenger and cargo shipping to the Port of Baltimore. Maryland Governor Wes Moore declared a state of emergency. Economic losses were initially estimated at $15 million per day. Insurers were expected to incur multi-billion dollar losses for the damages, business disruptions, and liability claims.

Three temporary channels were opened by April 20, allowing about 15% of pre-collapse shipping to pass. A temporary deep-draft channel was opened on April 25, allowing some larger ships to enter and leave, then closed on April 29, enabling salvage crews to resume removing bridge wreckage.

The collapsed part of the bridge includes the three spans under the metal truss, and three more to the northeast (right of image in Dundalk, Maryland). The left side of the image is Hawkins Point, Baltimore.

In May, the authorities used explosives in order to remove the portions of the collapsed remnants of the bridge that lay atop the ship.

=== Replacement ===
Hours after the collapse, President Joe Biden said that the federal government would pay for the reconstruction of the bridge. On May 2, 2024, Maryland Department of Transportation officials said that they planned to replace the bridge by late 2028 at an estimated cost of $1.7 billion to $1.9 billion. The original bridge had cost $141 million to build ($568 million today). On November 17, 2025, Maryland officials announced that the projected replacement cost had increased to $4.3 billion to $5.2 billion and that the anticipated opening date had been delayed to late 2030.

In August 2024, the Maryland Transportation Authority awarded a progressive design-build contract for the replacement bridge to Kiewit Corporation of Omaha, Nebraska. That month, the state also received a $350 million insurance payout from Chubb, the bridge's insurer. In October 2024, the United States Department of Justice announced a $101.98 million settlement with Grace Ocean Private Ltd. and Synergy Marine Private Ltd., the owner and manager of the cargo ship Dali, to resolve federal claims for costs incurred in clearing the Fort McHenry Channel and restoring access to the Port of Baltimore. In December 2024, Congress provided that the federal share for Emergency Relief funds used to respond to the damage caused by the Dali, including reconstruction of the bridge and its approaches, would be 100 percent; the law also provided that insurance proceeds, settlements, judgments and other compensation recovered for the reconstruction would be used to reduce federal liability for the project. Pre-construction activities for the replacement bridge were scheduled to begin on January 7, 2025.

== Sources ==
- NTSB (May 14, 2024). "Contact of Containership Dali with the Francis Scott Key Bridge and Subsequent Bridge Collapse" (PDF). National Transportation Safety Board.
