= MDTA =

The initials MDTA may refer to:

- The Maryland Transportation Authority, the agency that operates toll facilities in Maryland
- Miami-Dade Transit, the public transit authority in Miami-Dade County, Florida
