= Interstate 895 =

Highway in Maryland

Interstate 895
- Harbor Tunnel Thruway
- I-895 and spurs highlighted in red

Route information
- Auxiliary route of I-95
- Maintained by MDTA
- Length: 11.44 mi (18.41 km)
- Existed: 1979–present
- NHS: Entire route
- Restrictions: No hazardous goods allowed in the Baltimore Harbor Tunnel

Major junctions
- South end: I-95 in Elkridge
- US 1 in Elkridge; I-695 in Halethorpe; MD 295 in Baltimore Highlands; MD 2 in Baltimore; US 40 in Baltimore
- North end: I-95 in Baltimore

Location
- Country: United States
- State: Maryland
- Counties: Howard, Baltimore, Anne Arundel, Baltimore City

Highway system
- Interstate Highway System; Main; Auxiliary; Suffixed; Business; Future; Maryland highway system; Interstate; US; State; Scenic Byways
| ← MD 894 | → MD 896 |

Interstate 895 (I-895) is an auxiliary Interstate Highway in the US state of Maryland. Known as the Harbor Tunnel Thruway, the highway runs 11.44 miles (18.41 km) between one junction with I-95 in Elkridge and another interchange with I-95 on the east side of Baltimore. I-895 is a toll road that crosses the Patapsco River estuary via the Baltimore Harbor Tunnel, connecting U.S. Route 1 (US 1), I-695, and the Baltimore–Washington Parkway (B–W Parkway) in the southwestern suburbs of Baltimore with US 40 on the east side of Baltimore. In conjunction with a pair of spurs, unsigned I-895A and I-895B, I-895 provides access to the tunnel from I-97 and Maryland Route 2 (MD 2) in Glen Burnie. The highway is designed for through traffic by having partial interchanges that require vehicles from almost all starting points (with the two northernmost exits being exceptions) to pass through the tunnel and the tunnel toll plaza, where a $1.40-$6.00 toll is charged to passenger vehicles, before exiting the facility.

The idea of a crossing of the Patapsco River south of Downtown Baltimore had been studied since the 1930s. In the early 1950s, the Maryland State Roads Commission (SRC) chose to construct a four-lane tunnel between the Canton and Fairfield neighborhoods of Baltimore and approach highways to connect the tunnel with major highways to Washington, D.C.; Annapolis; Richmond, Virginia; and Philadelphia, Pennsylvania. The tunnel and approach highways were constructed beginning in 1955 and opened in November 1957, opening a bottleneck for Baltimore through traffic, which formerly had to navigate the city streets. The Harbor Tunnel Thruway was connected with the John F. Kennedy Memorial Highway in the early 1960s and the portion of I-95 south to Washington DC in the early 1970s. With these connections, I-895 was burdened with most of the through traffic passing through Baltimore. The congestion was not resolved until I-95 through Baltimore was completed when the eight-lane Fort McHenry Tunnel opened in November 1985. The transfer of most traffic to the new tunnel allowed the Baltimore Harbor Tunnel to be partially shut down for extensive maintenance in the late 1980s.

In 2024, I-895 was designated a main detour route for through non-hazmat traffic in the wake of the Francis Scott Key Bridge collapse.

== Route description ==
I-895 is maintained by the Maryland Transportation Authority (MDTA) and, like all Interstate Highways, is a part of the National Highway System for its entire length.

=== Western approach ===
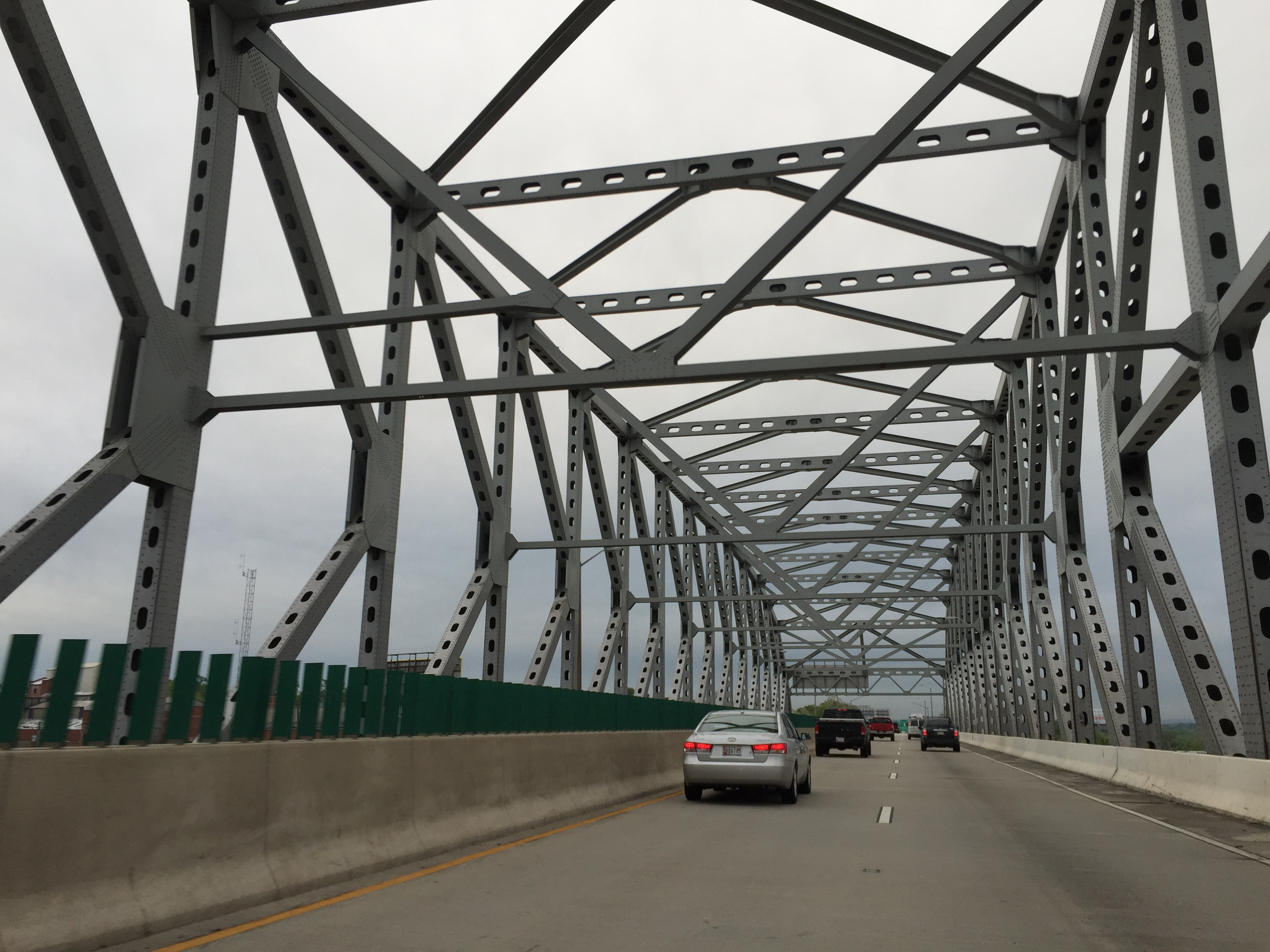
K-Truss Bridge over railroad tracks southwest of the tunnel

I-895 begins at exit 46 of I-95 in Elkridge with single-lane flyover ramps from northbound I-95 to I-895 and from I-895 to southbound I-95. The highway, which has a speed limit of 65 mph (105 km/h), expands to four lanes on a viaduct over local roads and CSX Transportation's Capital Subdivision railroad line and MARC Train's Camden Line. I-895 crosses the Patapsco River (the Howard–Baltimore county line) and US 1 (Washington Boulevard), then receives the exit 1 flyover ramps from northbound US 1 and to southbound US 1 before passing under I-195 with no access. I-895 continues east parallel to the Patapsco River. The highway passes along the southern edge of Halethorpe, where it crosses Amtrak's Northeast Corridor railroad line and MARC Train's Penn Line along with Herbert Run.

I-895 meets I-695 (Baltimore Beltway) at exit 3, which includes a loop ramp from eastbound I-695 and a ramp to westbound I-695. The highway crosses Hammonds Ferry Road in Baltimore Highlands before exit 4 with MD 295 (B–W Parkway), which includes a loop ramp to southbound MD 295 and a ramp from northbound MD 295. The speed limit drops to 55 mph (89 km/h), then the highway crosses MD 648 (Annapolis Road) and curves northeast across marshland, the main line of the Maryland Transit Administration (MTA)'s Baltimore Light RailLink, and the Patapsco River into Anne Arundel County. East of the river, I-895 receives flyover ramps from the thruway's southern approach, unsigned I-895B, at exit 6 in Brooklyn Park.

The highway enters the city of Baltimore and curves to the east over Patapsco Avenue before exit 7 with MD 2 (Potee Street), which includes a loop ramp to southbound MD 2 and a ramp from the intersection of MD 2 and MD 173 (Patapsco Avenue). I-895 parallels CSX Transportation's Curtis Bay Branch as the highway passes along the northern edge of the Brooklyn neighborhood. The highway crosses the Curtis Bay Branch on a steel K-truss bridge ahead of exits 8A and 8B. Exit 8A includes a loop ramp to and a flyover ramp from Shell Road, which heads toward the Curtis Bay neighborhood. Exit 8B includes ramps from eastbound Frankfurst Avenue and to westbound Frankfurst Avenue; that street leads to Hanover Street and Downtown Baltimore. I-895 passes through the 14-booth toll plaza for the tunnel; immediately to the east of the toll plaza is exit 9, a half diamond interchange with Childs Street for traffic to and from the toll plaza. The speed limit decreases to 50 mph (80 km/h) as the highway curves to the northeast through the Fairfield unit of the Port of Baltimore and descends into the Baltimore Harbor Tunnel.

=== Northern approach ===
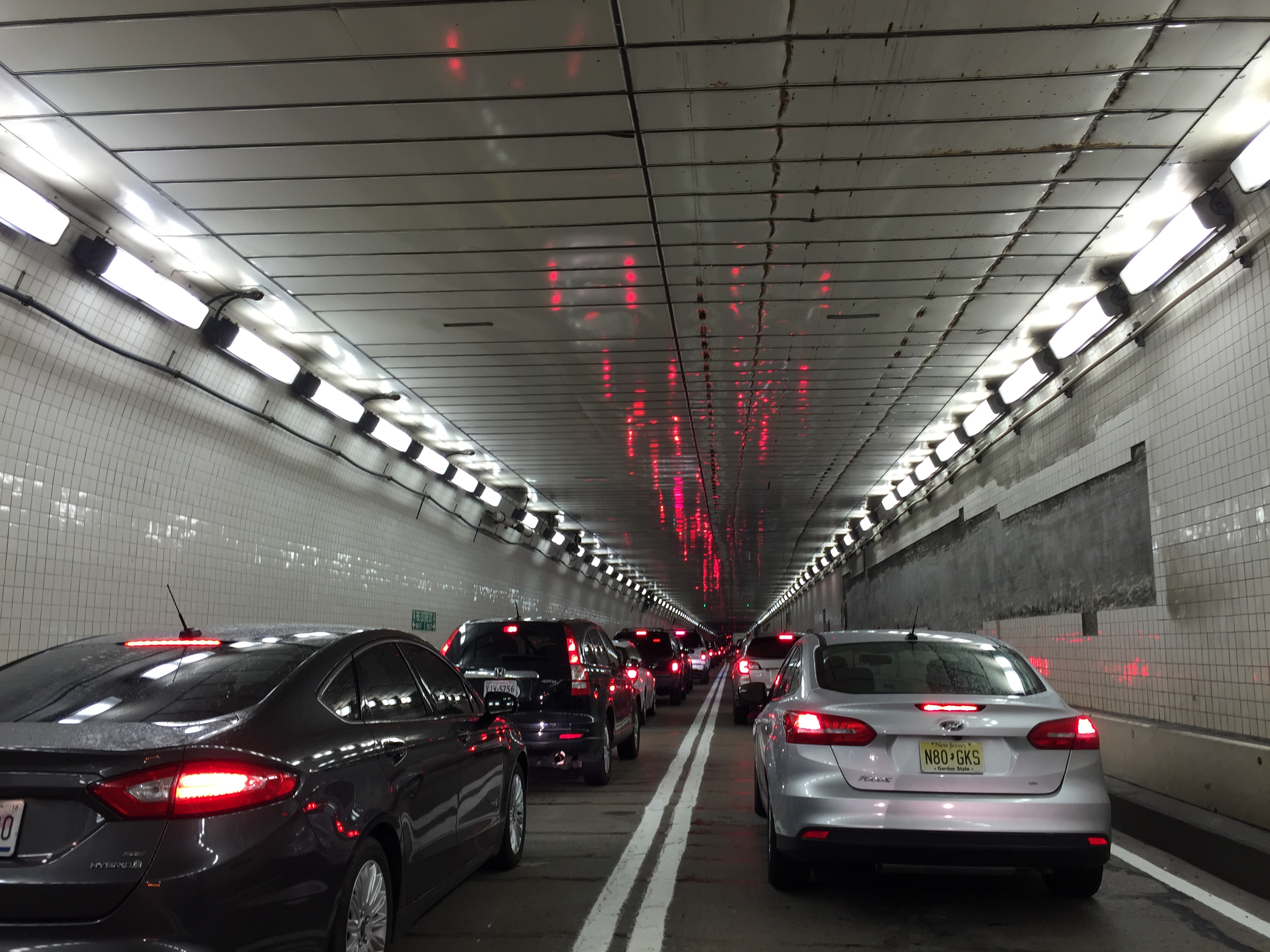
Baltimore Harbor Tunnel

I-895 surfaces from the tunnel adjacent to the toll plaza for the Fort McHenry Tunnel within the Canton neighborhood. The highway passes over several rail lines of the Canton Railroad and several streets as it curves to the north. The exit 10 ramp to Holabird Avenue diverges from I-895 immediately before the highway passes under I-95 with no access. I-895 returns to ground level and the highway crosses Ponca and Boston streets; the speed limit increases to 55 mph (89 km/h) ahead of exits 11A and 11B, which serve Boston and O'Donnell streets, respectively (with ramps to/from eastbound Boston Street and loop ramps to/from westbound O'Donnell Street). The highway crosses a rail line before passing through the Greektown neighborhood in a cut. I-895 passes under MD 150 (Eastern Avenue) ahead of exit 12, a four-ramp partial cloverleaf interchange with Lombard Street just to the west of Johns Hopkins Bayview Medical Center that has ramps in both directions of the Interstate, and is the only interchange to be built out that way.

The highway veers northeast and crosses both Amtrak's Northeast Corridor and CSX Transportation's Philadelphia Subdivision railroad lines before exit 13 with US 40 (Pulaski Highway) and MD 151 (Erdman Avenue); the entrance ramp extends from the US 40–MD 151 partial cloverleaf interchange immediately to the north and west. After crossing Herring Run, I-895 meets Moravia Road at exit 14, a five-ramp partial cloverleaf interchange that lacks an exit from northbound I-895, which is accessed via exit 13 and a loop ramp to the northwest. This interchange complements exit 60 off I-95, where the eastern terminus of Moravia Road meets the planned western terminus of the Windlass Freeway. A branch of the I-95 Express Toll Lanes begin within the interchange with Moravia Road, there are ramps from northbound I-895 to the northbound toll lanes, and from the southbound toll lanes to southbound I-895. The highway crosses Moores Run before reaching its northern terminus at exit 62 of I-95 (John F. Kennedy Memorial Highway), a pair of flyover ramps from I-895 to northbound I-95 and from southbound I-95 to I-895 on the boundary between the city of Baltimore and the Baltimore County community of Rosedale.

== History ==
=== Planning and construction ===
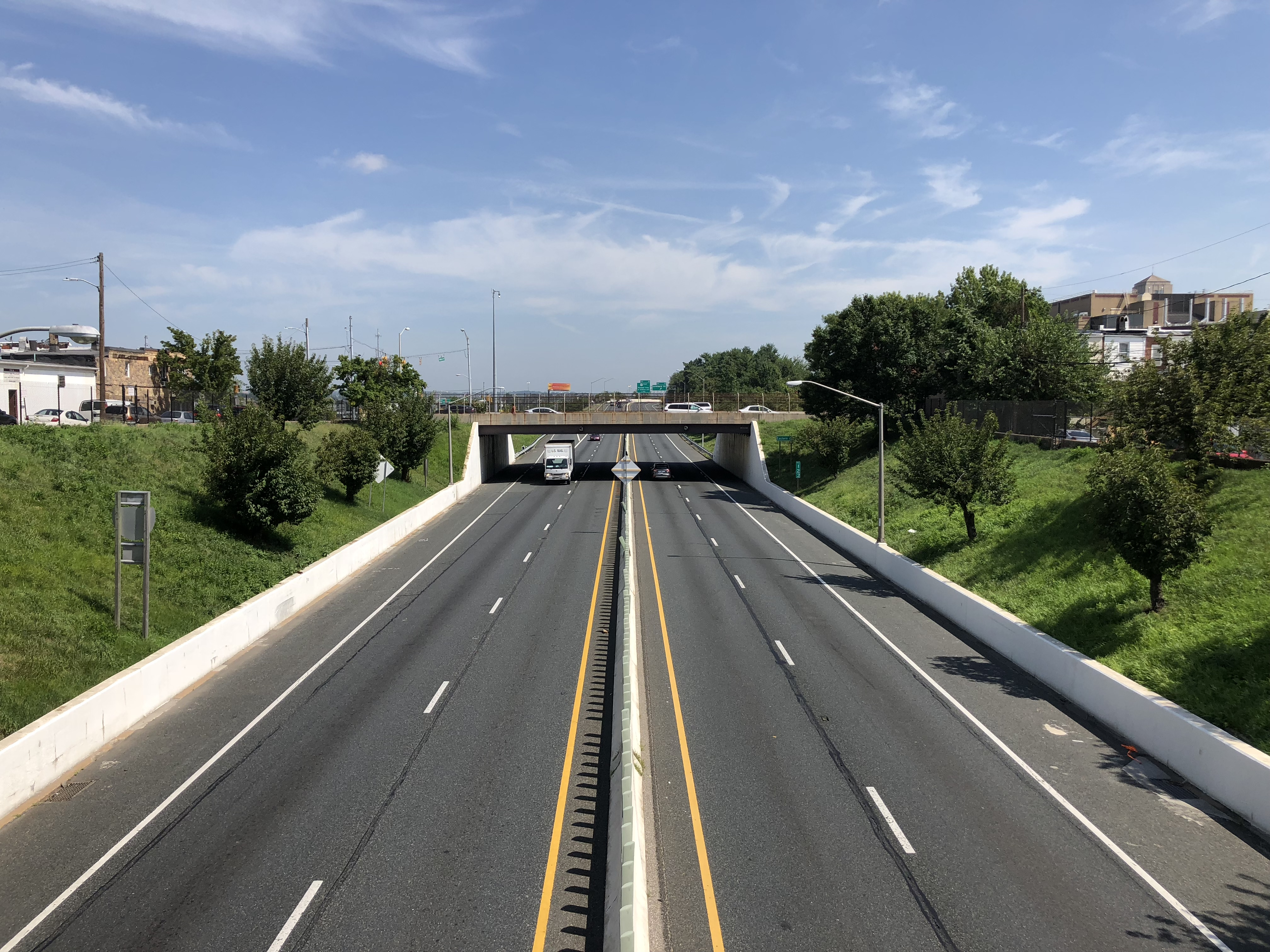
I-895 northbound passing through the Greektown section of Baltimore

In 1938, the SRC commissioned an engineering study, Maryland's Primary Bridge Program, to examine feasibility of major bridges across significant transportation barriers, including a bridge crossing the Patapsco River southeast of the Inner Harbor. Another study in 1944 examined the idea of a bridge with limited-access approach roads running from US 1 in Elkridge to the Patapsco River crossing and from the bridge to US 40 near Erdman Avenue in east Baltimore. The financial resources for the project were established in 1947 when the Maryland General Assembly passed an act allowing for the pooling of revenue bonds and toll receipts between the state's toll facilities—the existing Potomac River and Susquehanna River bridges, and the upcoming Chesapeake Bay Bridge—to finance the construction of the Patapsco River Crossing. Finally, a 1953 study examined three different routes—Canton–Fairfield, Canton–Fort McHenry, and a Canton–Fort McHenry–Fairfield dual crossing option—and whether the crossing should be a bridge or tunnel.

In 1954, the SRC decided to construct a tunnel between Canton and Fairfield, with three approach highways: a west approach from US 1 in Elkridge, a south approach from MD 2 in Glen Burnie to connect with the west approach in Brooklyn Park, and a north approach from US 40 and Erdman Avenue in east Baltimore. The approach highways were to be limited-access with directional, partial interchanges so that only traffic intending to use the tunnel would use the approach roads. Any vehicles entering an approach road would not be able to exit until having passed through the tunnel and the tunnel toll facility.

Shortly after work began on the Patapsco Tunnel Project on April 7, 1955, several changes were made to the plans for the approach highways. The northern terminus at US 40 was altered to allow an extension from US 40 to the southern end of the future Northeastern Expressway (now the John F. Kennedy Memorial Highway). As a result, additional connections with US 40 were planned for the area around present day exit 14. In addition, the south approach was to have a tie-in to the Glen Burnie Bypass (now I-97) then under construction. The tunnel and approach highways were completed and opened November 29, 1957, as the Baltimore Harbor Tunnel and the Harbor Tunnel Thruway, respectively. The opening of the tunnel and approach roads removed a significant amount of traffic from the streets of Baltimore and eliminated 51 traffic lights from the route of motorists passing through the city.

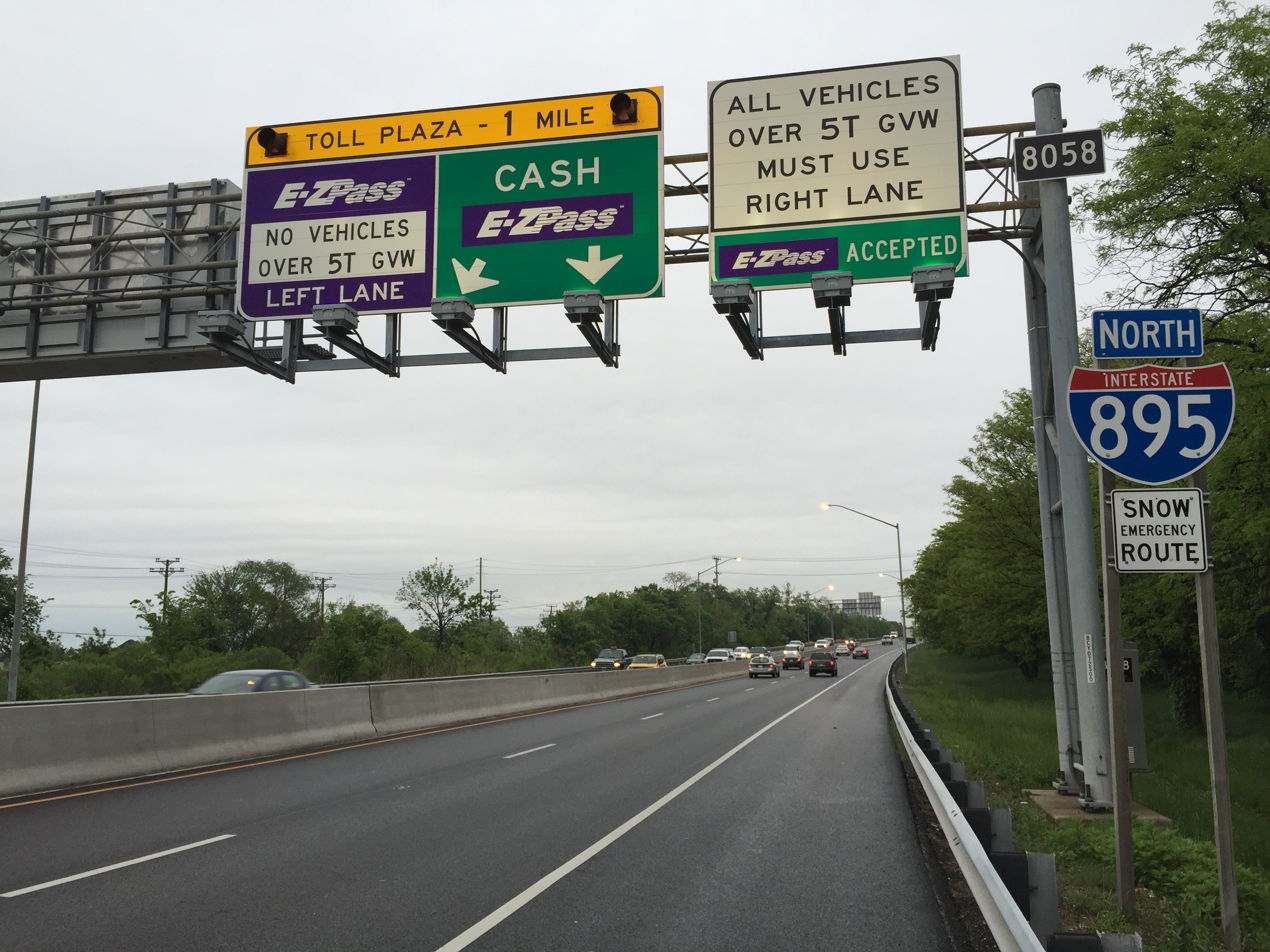
View north along I-895 just after entering Baltimore City

=== Improvements and relief ===
The Harbor Tunnel Thruway was extended north to the city limits of Baltimore to seamlessly connect with the Northeastern Expressway when that highway opened northeast to the Baltimore Beltway in 1961. In 1969, Moravia Road was extended east to US 40 using the connector between US 40 and the thruway and several ramps were added to that road's interchanges with US 40 and the thruway. In addition, flyover ramps were constructed at the city limits for I-95 to diverge from the John F. Kennedy Memorial Highway onto its own path through east Baltimore in 1970. The Harbor Tunnel Thruway was extended at its south end in 1973 to connect with I-95 shortly after that Interstate was completed between the Capital Beltway and the Baltimore Beltway in 1971.

Since I-95 had not yet been completed through Baltimore, the Harbor Tunnel Thruway, which was designated I-895 in 1979, was the main route for traffic passing through Baltimore. As a result, the highway was very congested, and travel through Baltimore had once again become a bottleneck. Relief came with the completion of the eight-lane Fort McHenry Tunnel on I-95 on November 23, 1985. With most traffic diverted to the new tunnel, major reconstruction work began on the Baltimore Harbor Tunnel. Traffic was reduced to one lane in each direction through the tunnel as each of the two tubes was renovated between 1987 and 1989. More recent changes include the elimination of the entrance ramp from Ponca Street at exit 10, the expansion of exit 12 to a full interchange (the only full interchange along the route other than its termini at I-95) to provide access to Johns Hopkins Bayview Medical Center in both directions (thus shortening the toll portion of I-895), and the reconstruction of the northern interchange with I-95 in 2009 so I-895 enters and exits I-95 on the right side of the roadway; previously, I-95 exited itself southbound by forcing traffic to weave to the right and access a flyover ramp, and northbound I-895 merged with I-95 from the left.

The Canton Viaduct, a 3,400-foot (1,000 m) elevated structure carrying I-895 over a railroad yard, Ponca Street and the ramps connecting I-95 to Keith Avenue, was replaced in the late 2010s and early 2020s. The project was announced in 2014. The viaduct, next to the toll plaza for the Fort McHenry Tunnel, was one of the oldest Interstate bridges in Maryland. Similar to what was done in the late 1980s rehabilitation of the tunnel, one side of the viaduct was closed while the other operated with one lane in each direction. Construction started in 2018 and was expected to be completed in 2021.

=== Tolls and exit numbers ===
The original toll for the Harbor Tunnel Thruway was $0.40 (equivalent to $4.59 in 2025) for passenger vehicles and $0.85 (equivalent to $9.74 in 2025) for trucks. By 1985, the toll had risen to $1.00 (equivalent to $2.99 in 2025). Electronic toll collection began at the toll plaza in 1999 for M-TAG customers; the M-TAG system was absorbed by E-ZPass in 2001. The MDTA increased the toll for passenger vehicles to $2.00 (equivalent to $3.50 in 2025) in 2003. In May 2011, the agency announced the toll for the Harbor Tunnel Thruway and the two other harbor crossings would increase to $3.00 (equivalent to $4.29 in 2025) on October 1, 2011, and to $4.00 (equivalent to $5.53 in 2025) on July 1, 2013.

The Harbor Tunnel Thruway has had three different exit number systems throughout its existence. The first numbering scheme was in place by 1963. The northbound exits were numbered between 1 (Holabird Avenue) and 5 (US 40), while the southbound exits were numbered 1 (Hanover Street) to 7 (US 1). The second numbering scheme, which did not change the interchange numbers on the northern approach to the tunnel, was introduced in 1971. The exits on the western approach were renumbered 11 (Hanover Street) to 17 (US 1). Under both schemes, the Childs Street exit did not have a number and the Moravia Road interchange was numbered as exit 1 of the John F. Kennedy Memorial Highway. The third and present numbering scheme was enacted in 1991.

== Exit list ==
| County | Location | mi | km | Exit | Destinations | Notes |
|---|---|---|---|---|---|---|
| Howard | Elkridge | 0.00 | 0.00 | — | I-95 south | Exit 46 on I-95 |
| Baltimore | Elkridge | 1.04 | 1.67 | 1 | US 1 south (Washington Boulevard) | Southbound exit and northbound entrance |
| Baltimore | Halethorpe | 3.43 | 5.52 | 3 | I-695 north – Towson | Southbound exit and northbound entrance; exit 8A on I-695 |
| Baltimore | Baltimore Highlands | 4.37 | 7.03 | 4 | MD 295 south (Baltimore–Washington Parkway) to I-695 east – BWI Marshall Airport | Southbound exit and northbound entrance |
| Anne Arundel | Brooklyn Park | 5.78 | 9.30 | 6 | To I-97 south / MD 2 south – Glen Burnie, Annapolis | Southbound exit and northbound entrance; access via I-895B; also serves Bowie and Richmond |
| Baltimore City | | 6.86 | 11.04 | 7 | Potee Street south (MD 2) | Southbound exit and northbound entrance; serves Brooklyn |
| Baltimore City | | 7.82 | 12.59 | 8 | Frankfurst Avenue to Shell Road / Hanover Street | Southbound exit and northbound entrance; signed as exits 8A (Shell Road) and 8B (Hanover Street) |
| Baltimore City | | 8.12 | 13.07 | Baltimore Harbor Tunnel Toll Plaza (E-ZPass or Video Tolling) | | |
| Baltimore City | | 8.26 | 13.29 | 9 | Childs Street to Frankfurst Avenue | Northbound exit and southbound entrance; serves Port of Baltimore |
| Baltimore City | | 8.87– 10.18 | 14.27– 16.38 | Baltimore Harbor Tunnel under Patapsco River | | |
| Baltimore City | | 11.01 | 17.72 | 10 | Holabird Avenue – Dundalk | Northbound exit only |
| Baltimore City | | 11.68 | 18.80 | 11A | Boston Street | Northbound exit and southbound entrance |
| Baltimore City | | 11.68 | 18.80 | 11B | O'Donnell Street | Northbound exit and southbound entrance |
| Baltimore City | | 12.43 | 20.00 | 12 | Lombard Street | Serves Johns Hopkins Bayview Campus |
| Baltimore City | | 13.28 | 21.37 | 13 | US 40 east (Pulaski Highway) / Erdman Avenue | Northbound exit and southbound entrance |
| Baltimore City | | 13.89 | 22.35 | 14 | Moravia Road | No northbound exit; additional southbound exit and northbound entrance via express lanes |
| Baltimore City | | 13.89 | 22.35 | — | I-95 Express north to MD 43 | Northbound exit only; express lanes use E-ZPass or Video Tolling |
| Baltimore City | | 14.87 | 23.93 | — | I-95 north – New York | Exit 62 on I-95 |
1.000 mi = 1.609 km; 1.000 km = 0.621 mi: Electronic toll collection; Incomplete access

== Auxiliary routes ==
I-895 has two unsigned auxiliary routes, I-895A and I-895B. Both highways are portions of the southern approach to the Baltimore Harbor Tunnel that connects with the mainline of the Harbor Tunnel Thruway in Brooklyn Park. Both spurs are maintained by MdTA. I-895A and the portion of I-895B north of I-895A are part of the main National Highway System. The segment of I-895B between MD 2 and I-895A is a National Highway System principal arterial.

=== I-895A ===
I-895A is the designation for the 0.71-mile (1.14 km) connector between the northern end of I-97 just north of I-695 (Baltimore Beltway) and I-895B within Glen Burnie. The highway was constructed in 1957 to connect the northern end of the Glen Burnie Bypass with the Harbor Tunnel Thruway. In conjunction with the reconstruction of I-97's interchange with I-695, in which the loop ramp from I-97 north to I-695 west was replaced with a flyover joining I-695 on the left, a loop ramp was added on I-895A in 1995 to allow access to the right side of I-695 west for traffic exiting at MD 648 (Baltimore–Annapolis Boulevard).

=== I-895B ===
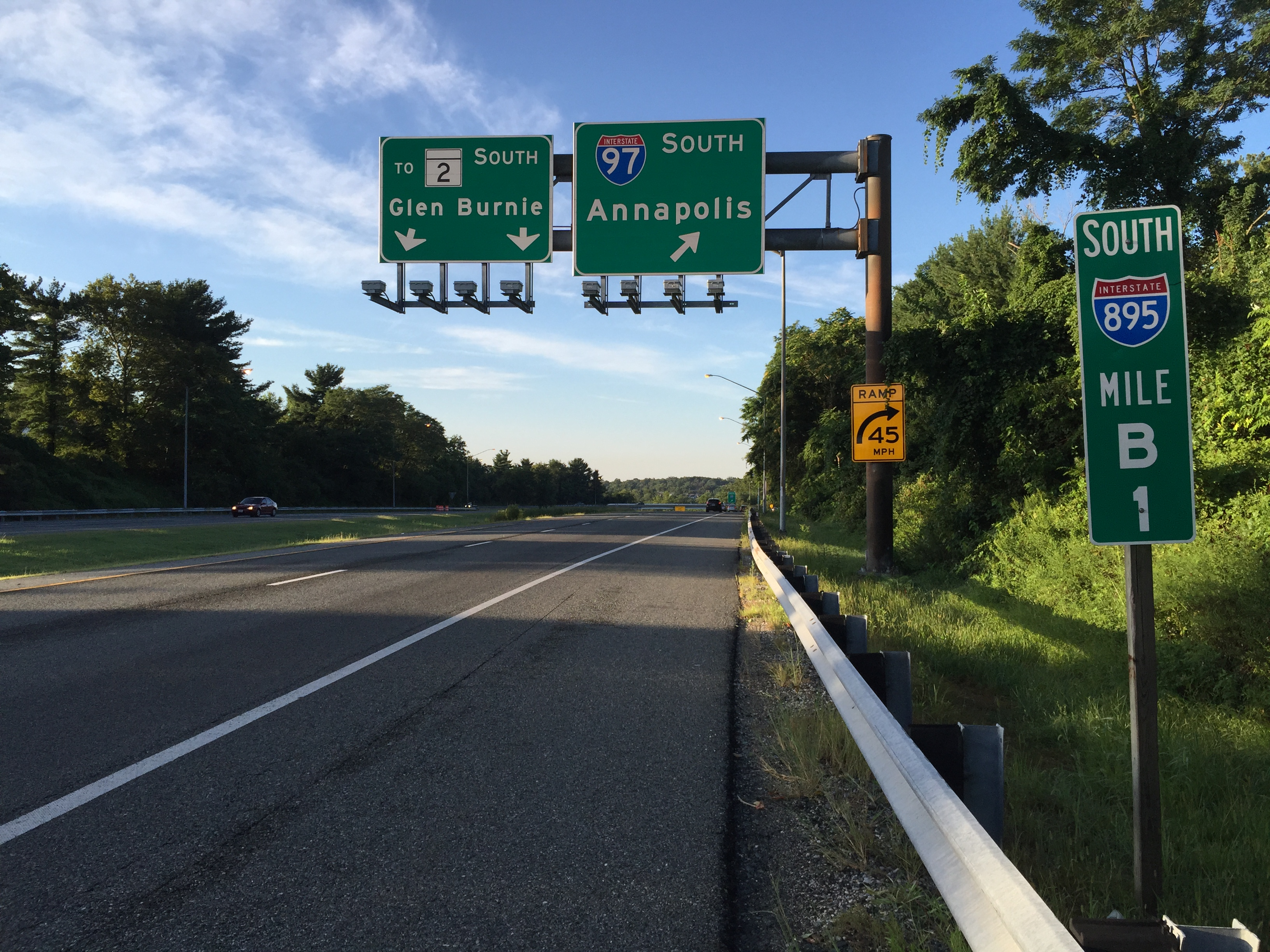
View looking south along I-895B (Baltimore Harbor Tunnel Thruway/Governor Ritchie Highway Connector) from overhead bridge for Hammonds Lane in Brooklyn Park

I-895B is the designation for the 2.67-mile (4.30 km) southern approach to the mainline of Harbor Tunnel Thruway between MD 2 (Governor Ritchie Highway) in Glen Burnie and I-895 in Brooklyn Park. The highway was completed in 1957 with the remainder of the Harbor Tunnel Thruway. The only change to the southern approach is the addition of ramps from I-895B north to I-695 west and from I-695 east to I-895B south to improve access between MD 2 and the Baltimore Beltway; these ramps, now marked as exit 3A on I-695 east, were completed in 1968.
