= Fort McHenry Tunnel =

Tunnel in Baltimore

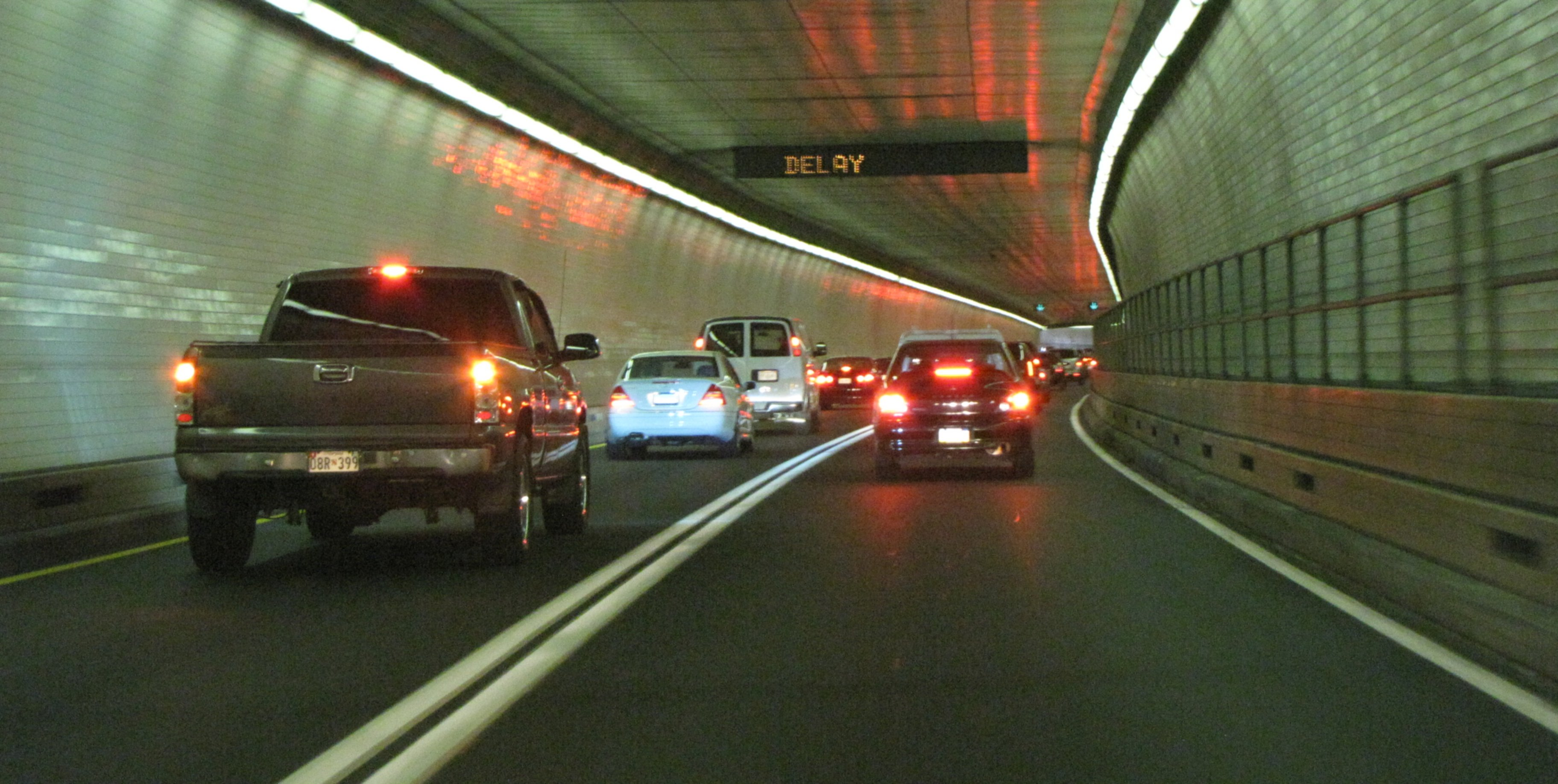
- Southbound tunnel, Bore 2

Overview
- Location: Baltimore Harbor
- Coordinates: 39°15′39.2″N 76°34′36.3″W
- Route: I-95
- Start: Locust Point
- End: Canton

Operation
- Constructed: 1980–1985
- Opened: November 23, 1985; 40 years ago
- Owner: Maryland Transportation Authority
- Traffic: Automotive
- Character: Highway
- Toll: Passenger cars: $3 Maryland E-ZPass $4 non-Maryland E-ZPass $6 Video toll
- Vehicles per day: 115,000

Technical
- Length: 1.5 miles (2.4 km)
- No. of lanes: 8
- Operating speed: 55 miles per hour (89 km/h)
- Min elevation: 107 feet (33 m) below harbor water surface
- Tunnel clearance: 13.6 feet (4.1 m)
- Width: 26 feet (7.9 m)

The Fort McHenry Tunnel is a four-tube, bi-directional tunnel that carries traffic on Interstate 95 (I-95) underneath the Baltimore Harbor. Named for nearby Fort McHenry, the tunnel is the lowest point in the Interstate Highway System under water.

Construction began in May 1980; the tunnel opened on November 23, 1985. Having consumed some $750 million (equivalent to $2.2 billion in 2025), it was the most expensive Interstate project until surpassed by the Big Dig in Boston. As of 2009, it was used by 43.4 million vehicles annually.

Tolls are collected in both directions. The toll for cars is $3 with a Maryland E-ZPass and $4 with another state's E-ZPass. Vehicles without an E-ZPass pay more, as do those with more than two axles—up to $45 for a 6+ axle vehicle without an E-ZPass. All-electronic tolling using E-ZPass or toll-by-plate started in March 2020 as a result of the COVID-19 pandemic and was made permanent in August 2020. A project to demolish the toll plaza and replace it with overhead gantries for open road tolling started in 2022.

== Location ==
Northbound trip through tunnel

The tunnel crosses the Patapsco River, just south of Fort McHenry; it connects the Locust Point and Canton areas of Baltimore City.

The original intent for I-95 was to fly a bridge over Fort McHenry. Local residents of Locust Point, the neighborhood surrounding Fort McHenry fought against the bridge into the tunnel that exists today. This local resistance was led by Shirley Ann Doda and her husband, Victor P. Doda who fought vociferously with Mayor William Donald Schaeffer. They would later become allies who shared a love for the city.

== Design and construction ==
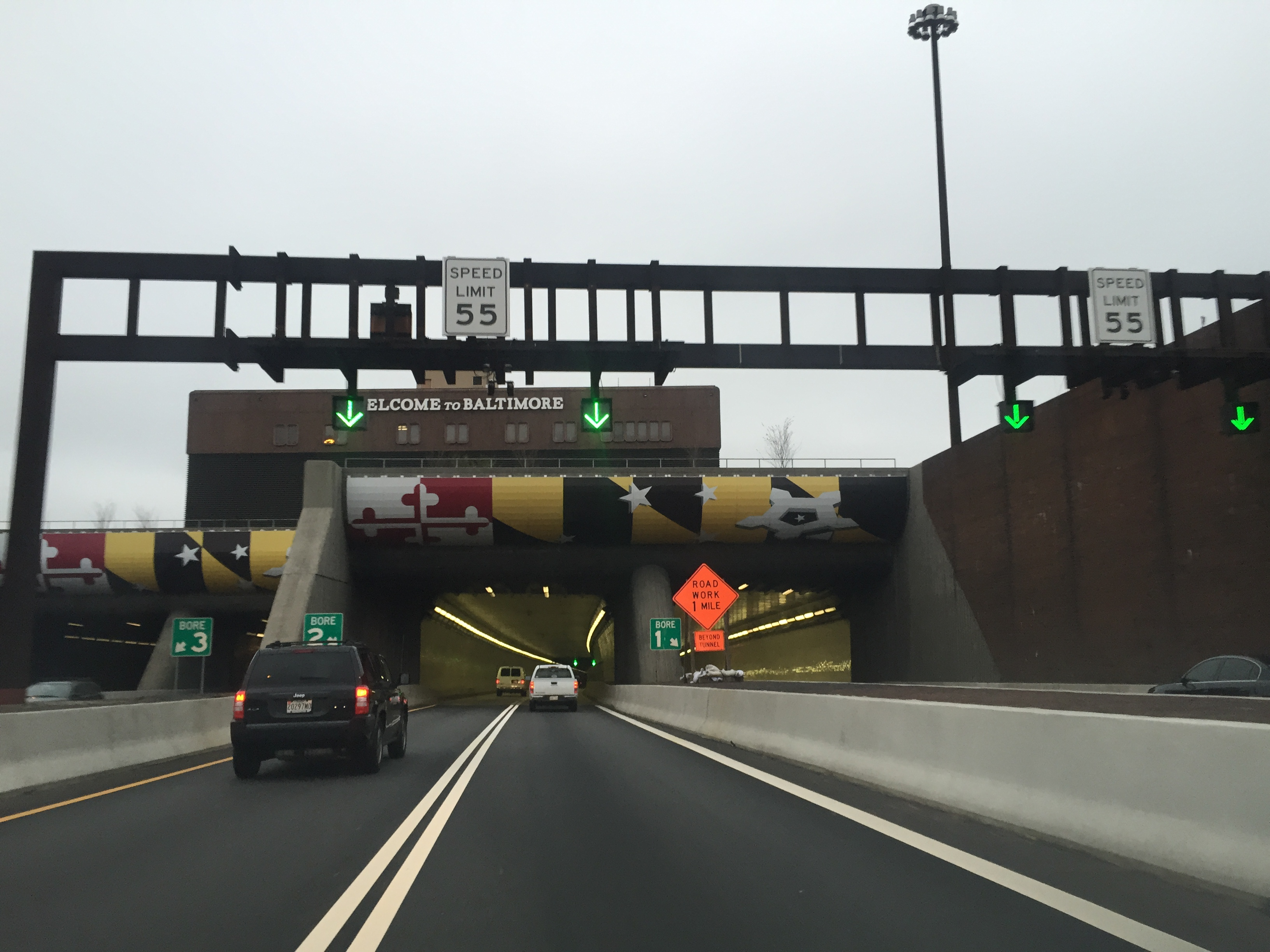
View of entrance to tunnel

Plans for a second crossing of the Baltimore Harbor that would become the Fort McHenry Tunnel began in the late 1960s. Early plans called for an 8-lane double-deck bridge to carry I-95 over the harbor just south of Fort McHenry. In 1975, plans were changed to a tunnel after it was determined that a bridge would hurt Fort McHenry's status as a national monument.

The state of Maryland originally intended to build the tunnel with a reinforced concrete box design, but plans were changed in February 1976 to use a steel tubular design after a dispute with the Federal Highway Administration. The tunnel was to be constructed using the immersed tube method, with prefabricated tubes sunken into the harbor.

Construction began in May 1980 by K-R-T (a joint venture between Peter Kiewit Sons Company, Raymond International Builders, and Tidewater Construction Corporation), and was completed in November 1985. Ninety percent of construction costs were covered by federal funding, while 10 percent came from state funding. The tunnel consists of 32 tube sections, each 82 feet (25 m) wide and 42 feet (13 m) tall. The east and west approaches are 1,600 feet (490 m) and 3,200 feet (980 m) long, respectively.

Opened on time and under budget, the tunnel closed a gap in I-95 through Maryland. Soon after the Fort McHenry Tunnel opened, the nearby Baltimore Harbor Tunnel, which had opened to traffic in 1957, was extensively rehabilitated.

The Fort McHenry Tunnel continues to be a vital transportation link in the Mid-Atlantic region. After the Francis Scott Key Bridge collapsed on March 26, 2024, the tunnel became one of the primary alternate routes for drivers and trucks containing non-hazardous loads.

== See also ==
- Francis Scott Key Bridge (Baltimore)
