= Baltimore Harbor Tunnel =

Tunnel in Baltimore, Maryland, US

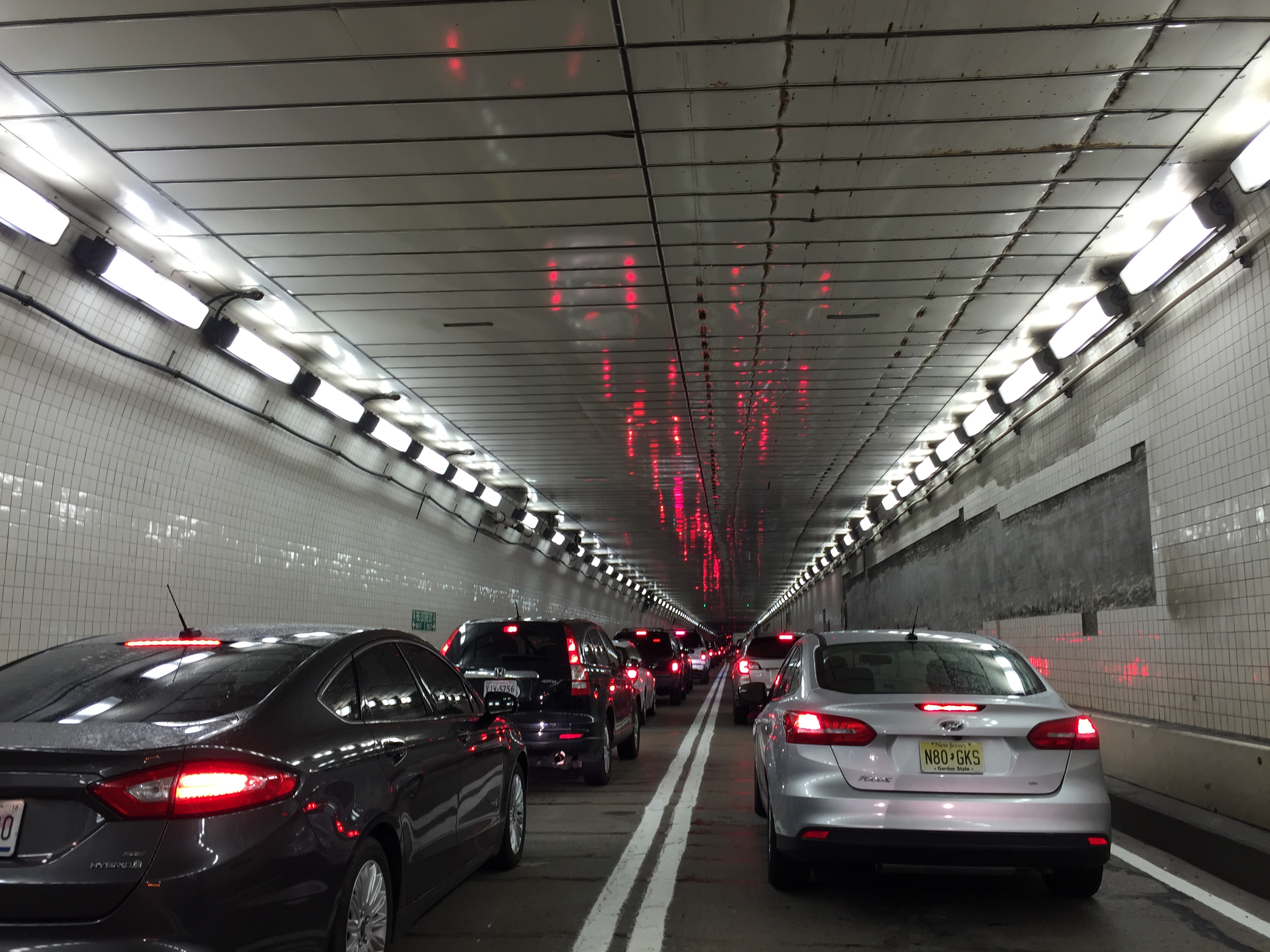
- Baltimore Harbor Tunnel, traveling northbound on I-895

Overview
- Location: Patapsco River, Baltimore, Maryland, U.S.
- Coordinates: 39°15′15″N 76°34′16″W
- Route: I-895

Operation
- Opened: November 29, 1957; 68 years ago
- Operator: Maryland Transportation Authority
- Toll: Passenger cars: $3 Maryland E-ZPass $4 non-Maryland E-ZPass $6 Video toll

Technical
- Length: 7,650 ft (1.45 mi; 2.33 km)
- No. of lanes: 4
- Operating speed: 50 miles per hour (80 km/h)
- Tunnel clearance: 14 ft (4.3 m)

The Baltimore Harbor Tunnel is a pair of two-lane road tunnels carrying I-895 under the Patapsco River southeast of downtown Baltimore, Maryland.

== Description ==
The pair of tunnels are 7,650 feet (1.45 mi; 2.33 km) long, stretching from the south shore of the Patapsco River to the north shore near Dundalk. Each tunnel is 22 feet (6.7 m) wide and 14 feet (4.3 m) high, and accommodates two lanes of traffic. The maximum speed within the tunnel is 50 miles per hour (80 km/h). Two-way traffic may occur in either tunnel for overnight roadwork or during emergencies that close down one of the tunnels. The Tunnel has lane control signals to control which lanes are open, closed or as contra-flow traffic.

Both portals have ventilation buildings, with a total of 32 fans in place to replace the air within the tunnels, which is drawn in through the tunnel floors and exhausted through the tunnel ceilings. The tubes themselves range from a depth of 50 feet (15.2 m) below ground to 101 feet (30.8 m) below ground.

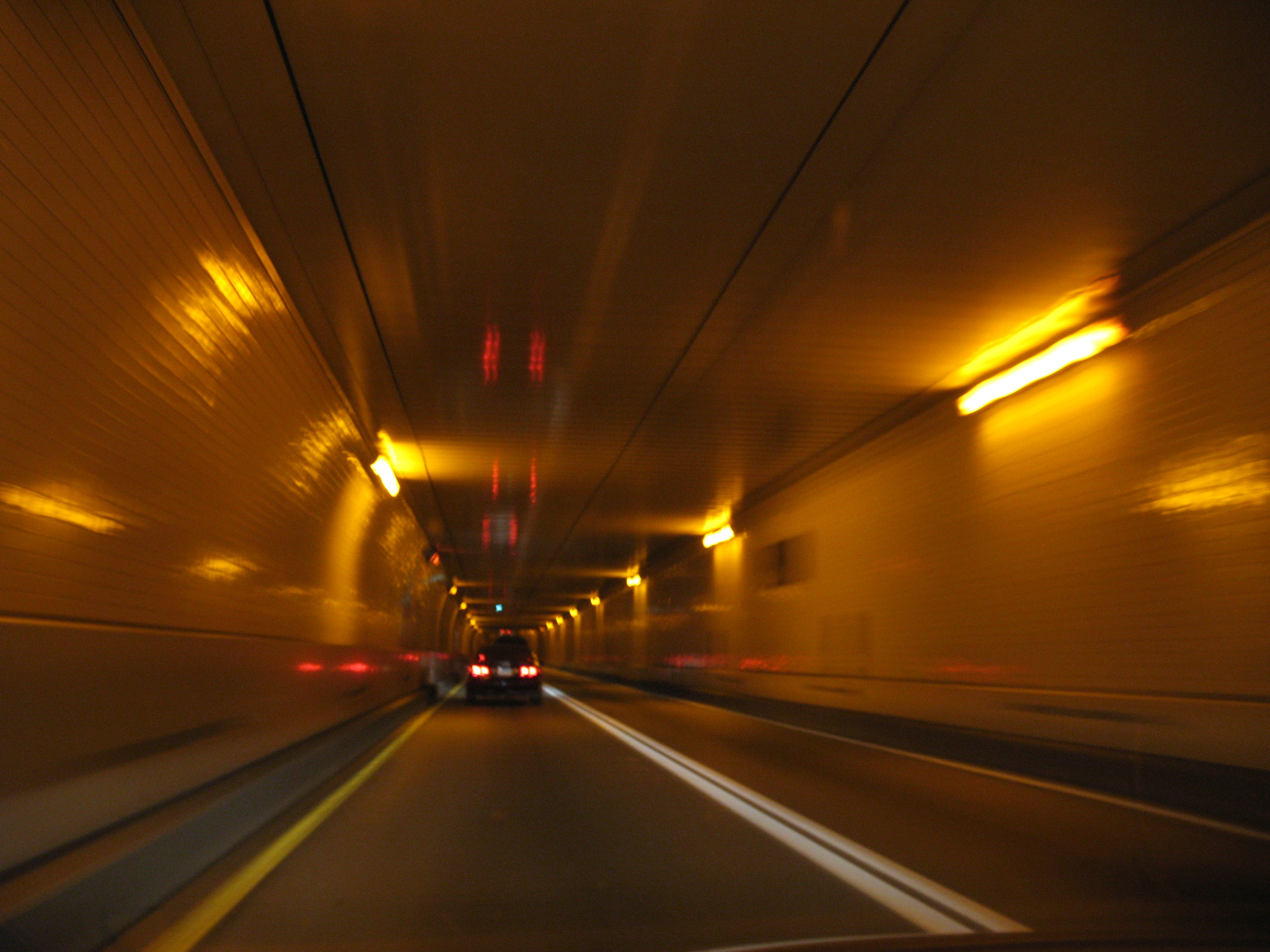
Baltimore Harbor Tunnel, traveling southbound on I-895

As of July 1, 2015, the toll rate for cars is $4.00 cash or $3.00 E-ZPass, paid in both directions. Vehicles with more than two axles pay additional amounts, up to $30.00 for six axles. In March 2020, all-electronic tolling was implemented as a result of the COVID-19 pandemic, with tolls payable through E-ZPass or Video Tolling, which uses automatic license plate recognition. All-electronic tolling was made permanent in August 2020.

== History ==
The tunnel and approaches were designed by Singstad and Baillie, a New York-based engineering firm specializing in tunnel design, in association with the J. E. Greiner Company, a local Baltimore-based firm. The tunnel was formed out of twenty-one 310-foot-long (94 m) sections individually submerged into a pre-dredged trench in the harbor and secured with rocks and backfill; the first of these tunnel segments was sunk on April 11, 1956. The remainder of the tunnel was constructed using the cut-and-cover method, extending from the submerged tubes to the north and south portals. The project's costs ultimately reached $150 million ($1,719 million in 2025).

The tunnel opened on November 29, 1957, with a dedication by Maryland Governor Theodore McKeldin and a crowd of 4,000 spectators. The initial toll for standard cars was 40¢. In the first 12 hours of operation, the tunnel handled an estimated 10,000 vehicles, mostly drivers from Maryland. In the same period, the tunnel also experienced its first collision (15 minutes after opening), first flat tire and first stalled vehicle.

The tunnel was considered a success by the Maryland Transportation Authority (MDTA), as it eliminated 51 traffic signals for through-traffic in Baltimore, and reduced neighborhood street commercial traffic by up to 40%. However, increased tunnel usage and high traffic volume led to the planning, construction, and opening of the nearby Fort McHenry Tunnel in 1985, creating the final link of Interstate 95 in Maryland. The Harbor Tunnel was then closed in phases for extensive rehabilitation, beginning in March 1987. It was fully reopened by 1990.

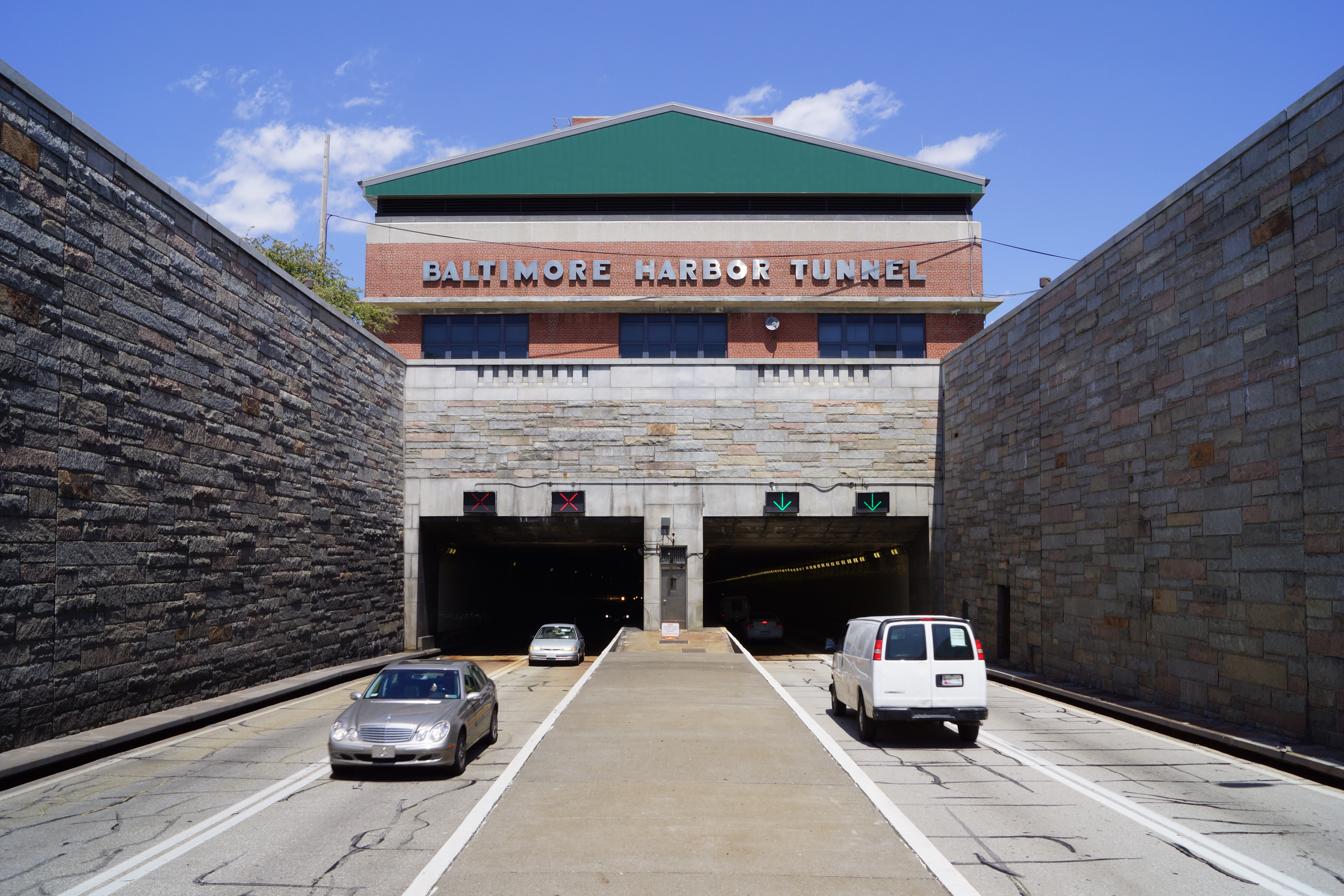
The southwestern entrance of the tunnel

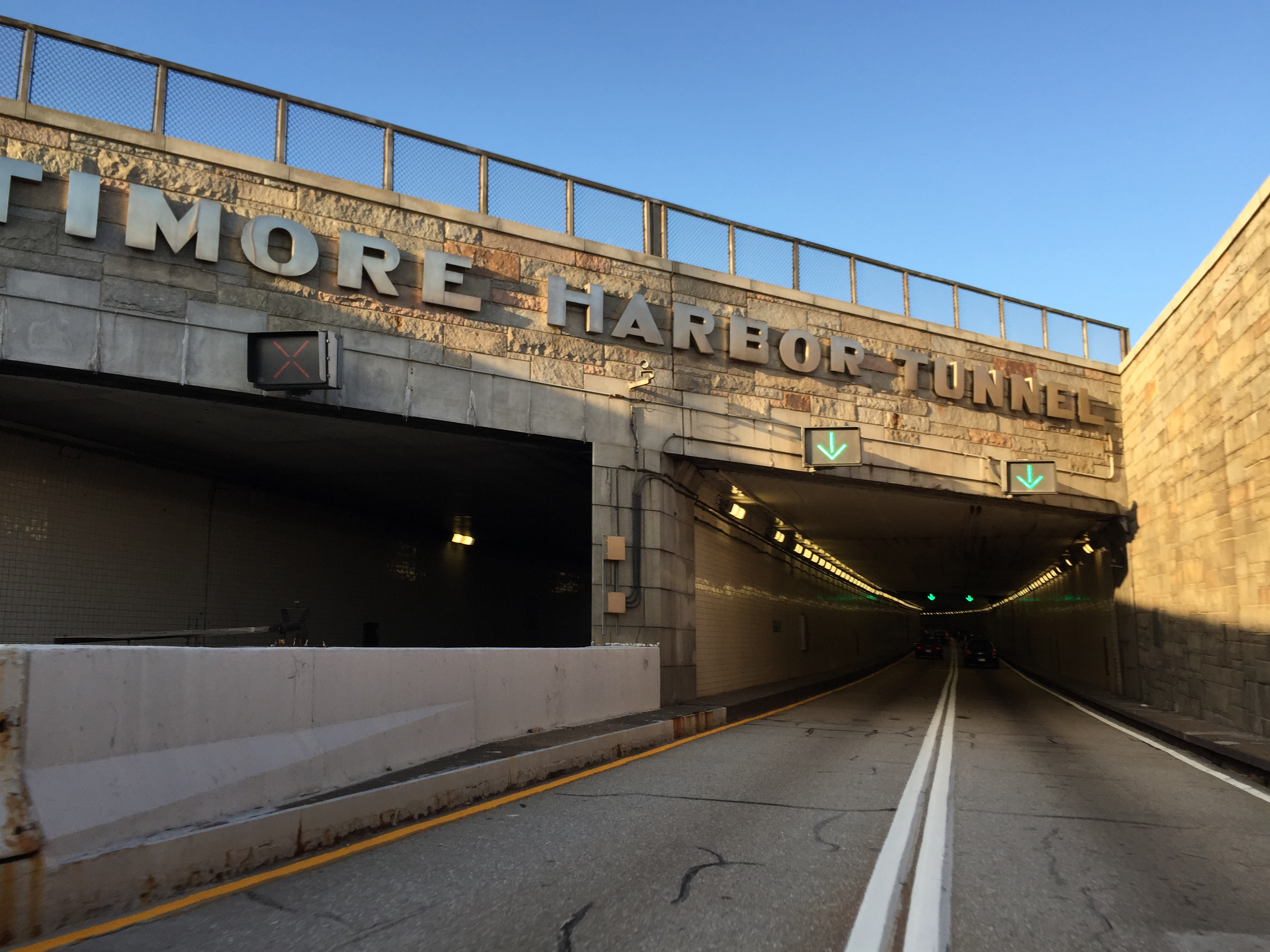
The northeastern entrance of the tunnel

In November 2007, the 50th anniversary of the tunnel serving travelers was observed. In November 2018, the MDTA started a multi-year project to replace the I-895 bridge spans north of the tunnel. The $189 million project also includes $28 million to repair and upgrade the tunnel itself. Originally planned to be complete by summer 2021, work was largely finished ahead of schedule in December 2020.

After the Francis Scott Key Bridge collapse on March 26, 2024, the Harbor Tunnel became one of the primary alternate routes for drivers and trucks containing non-hazardous loads.
