= Maryland Transportation Authority =

Maryland state government agency

Agency overview
- Formed: 1971; 55 years ago
- Jurisdiction: Maryland
- Headquarters: 2310 Broening Highway, Baltimore, Maryland, U.S. 21224
- Employees: 1,700
- Agency executives: Katie Thomson, Board Chairman; Bruce W. Gartner, Executive Director
- Parent agency: Maryland Department of Transportation
- Website: mdta.maryland.gov

The Maryland Transportation Authority (MDTA) is an independent state agency responsible for financing, constructing, operating, and maintaining eight transportation facilities, currently consisting of two toll roads, two tunnels, and four bridges in Maryland. It also provides the Maryland Department of Transportation with financing for other revenue producing transportation projects.

== Agency structure ==
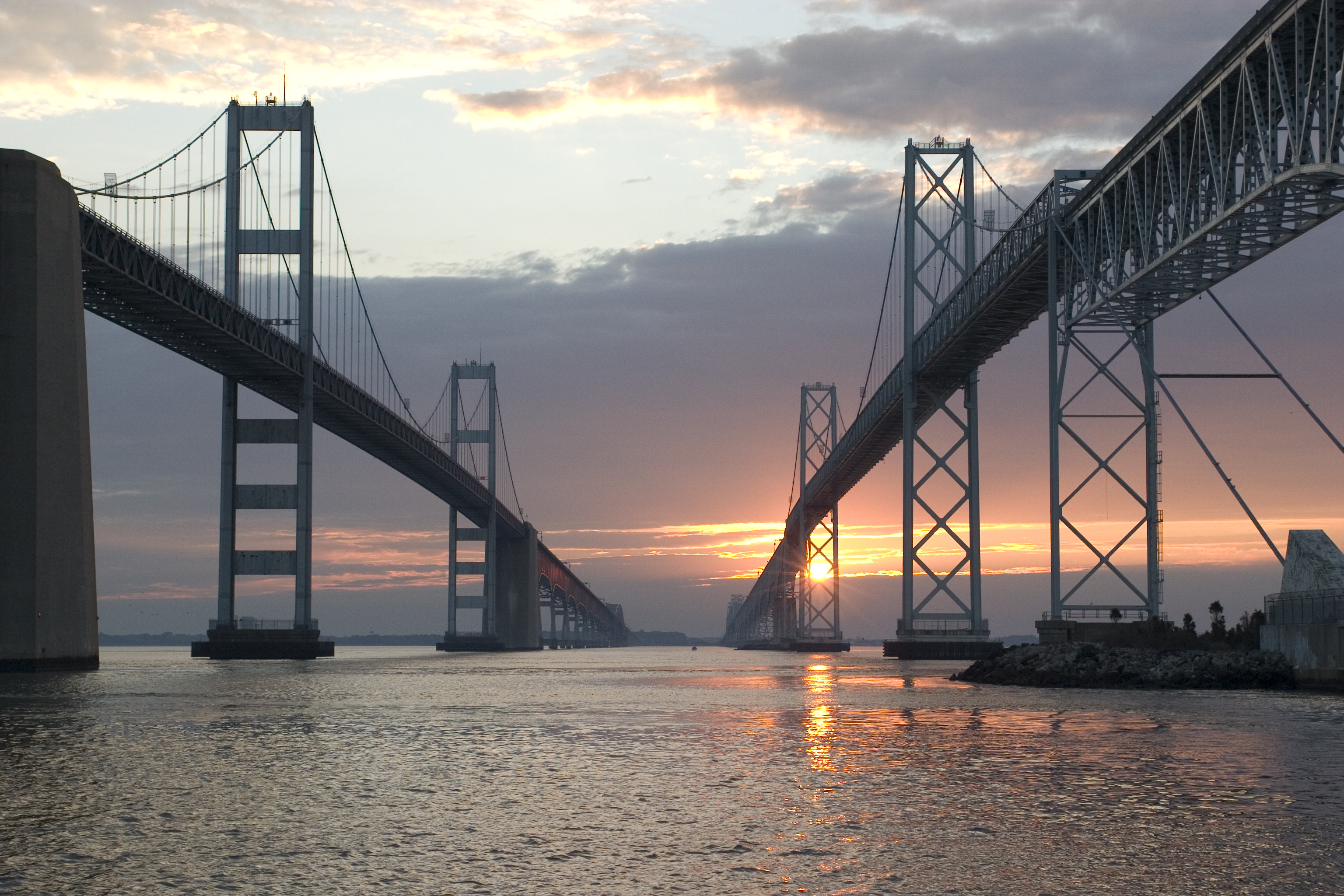
William Preston Lane Jr. Memorial (Bay) Bridge

The MDTA was established in 1971 to take over functions previously performed by the former State Roads Commission. Financially independent from Maryland's general fund and transportation trust fund, the Authority operates as a purely enterprise agency, providing services on a user charge basis similar to the operation of a commercial enterprise. Its capital projects and operations are funded by tolls, concessions, investment income, and revenue bonds.

In addition to its own transportation facilities, the Authority finances construction of other revenue-producing transportation facilities for the Maryland Department of Transportation (MDOT). These projects have included improvements at the Port of Baltimore and the Baltimore-Washington International Airport. To provide construction funding, the Authority issues revenue bonds, which will be paid off over a period of years by tolls and other user fees generated by the facilities.

The MDTA can issue either taxable or exempt bonds to finance large scale projects. As of June 30, 2010, the Authority had outstanding revenue bonds totaling $2.7 billion. Most of this debt was in the form of transportation facility revenue bonds valued at $1.6 billion, for MDTA toll facilities. Grant and Revenue Anticipation (GARVEE) bonds, secured by federal grants and revenue pledged from individual projects, comprised $651 million of the debt. Conduit revenue bonds, for the construction of transportation parking and airport passenger facilities, also secured by federal grants and the future revenue of specific facilities, comprised the rest of the debt. Unlike the transportation facility bonds, the conduit and GARVEE bonds are pledged to revenue sources managed by other agencies, external to the MDTA.

=== Governing board ===
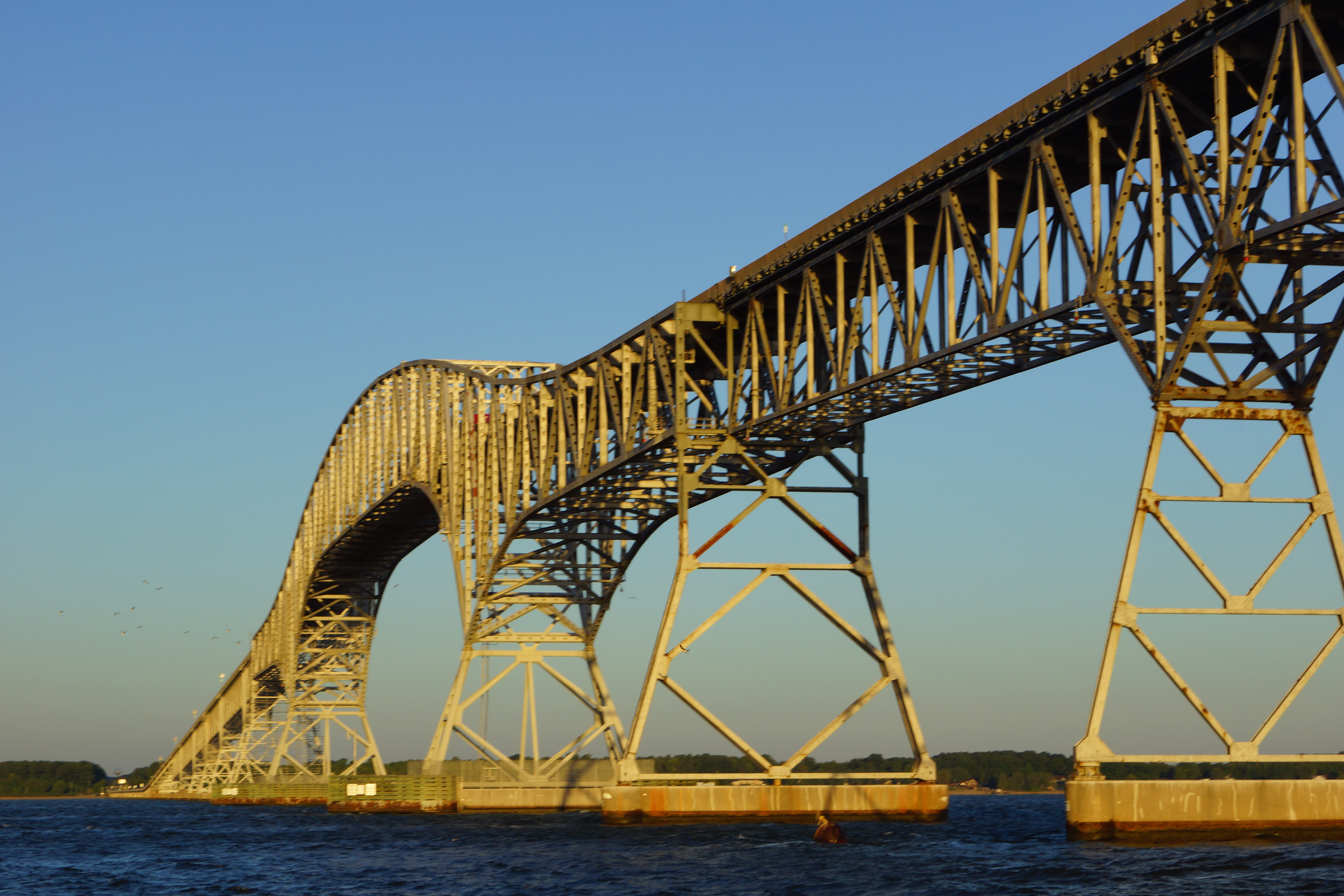
Gov. Harry W. Nice Memorial Bridge

The Maryland Secretary of Transportation serves as chairperson of the Authority's governing board. Eight other board members are appointed to four year terms by the Governor, with confirmation by the Maryland Senate. Term expirations are staggered. Board members can be reappointed to additional terms, but a limit of three consecutive terms was established in 2007.

Daily operations of the Authority are overseen by the Executive Director who serves as the chief executive officer for the agency and is hired by the MDTA Board.

Members of the board are:

- Katie Thomson, Maryland Transportation Secretary, Chair
- Dontae Carroll
- Marcela Cordova
- William H. Cox Jr.
- John F. von Paris
- Cynthia D. Penny-Ardinger
- Jeffrey S. Rosen
- Samuel D. Snead
- Frank S. Waesche III

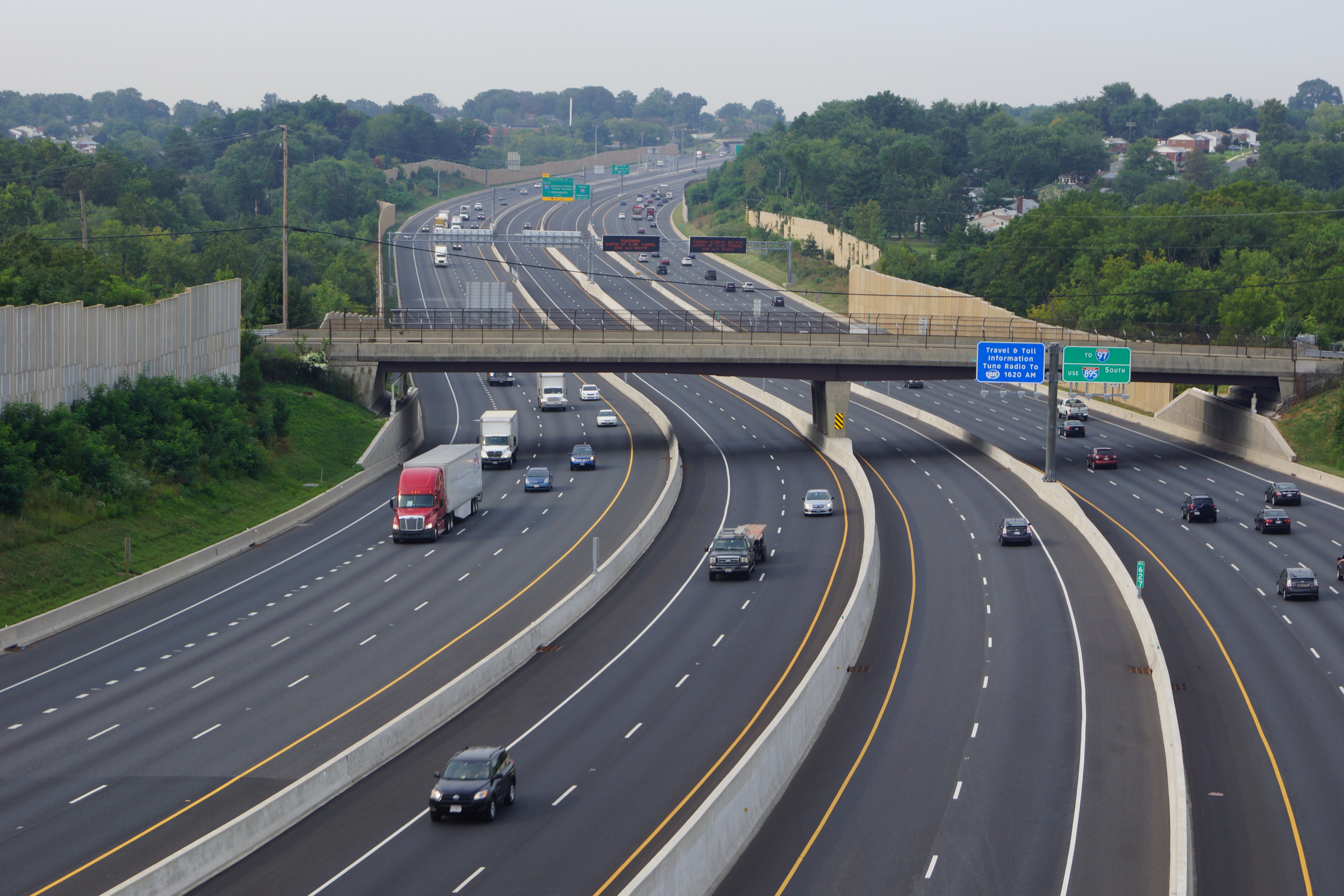
I-95 Express Toll Lanes (ETL)

The chairman is always the Maryland Secretary of Transportation. The chair has an absolute veto on all decisions; that is, no policy can be adopted or action carried out without the "concurrence" of the chair. Meeting minutes show the board usually votes unanimously.

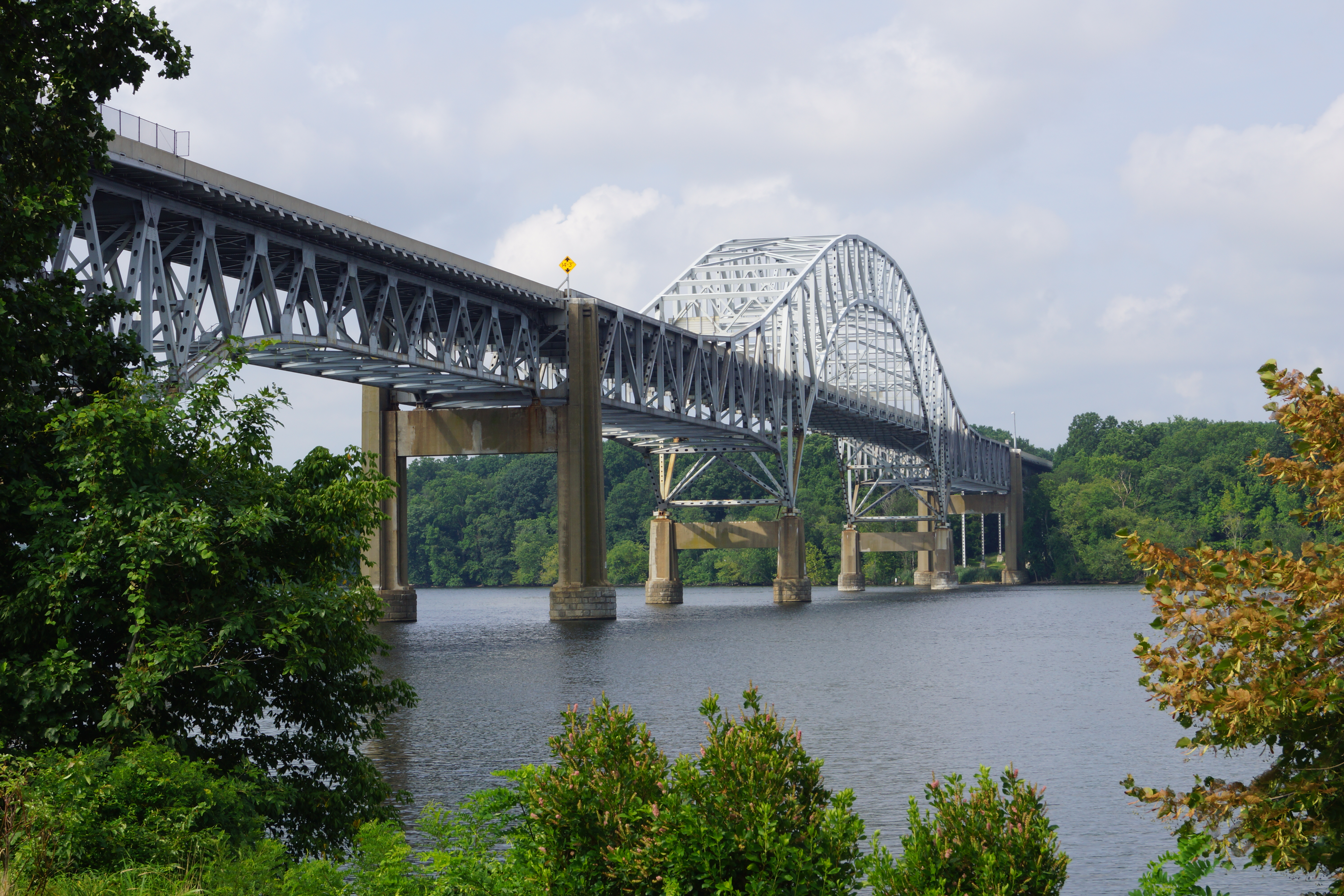
Thomas J. Hatem Memorial Bridge

The MDTA Board and its two active standing committees (Capital Committee and Finance Committee) were found in violation of the Maryland Open Meetings Act a number of times between 2009 and 2012. In response to one of the complaints, the MDTA began notifying the public of Finance and Capital committee meetings; allowing the public to attend them; and began putting meeting schedules and minutes of the two committees and the Board online. The MDTA maintains recordings of meetings at its offices on Broening Highway, Baltimore. Meeting audio or video is not available through their website.

=== MDTA Police ===
The Maryland Transportation Authority Police were established in 1971 as part of the MDTA. Their mission is protection of the Authority's facilities as well as several other transportation facilities including the Port of Baltimore and BWI Airport.

== Facilities ==
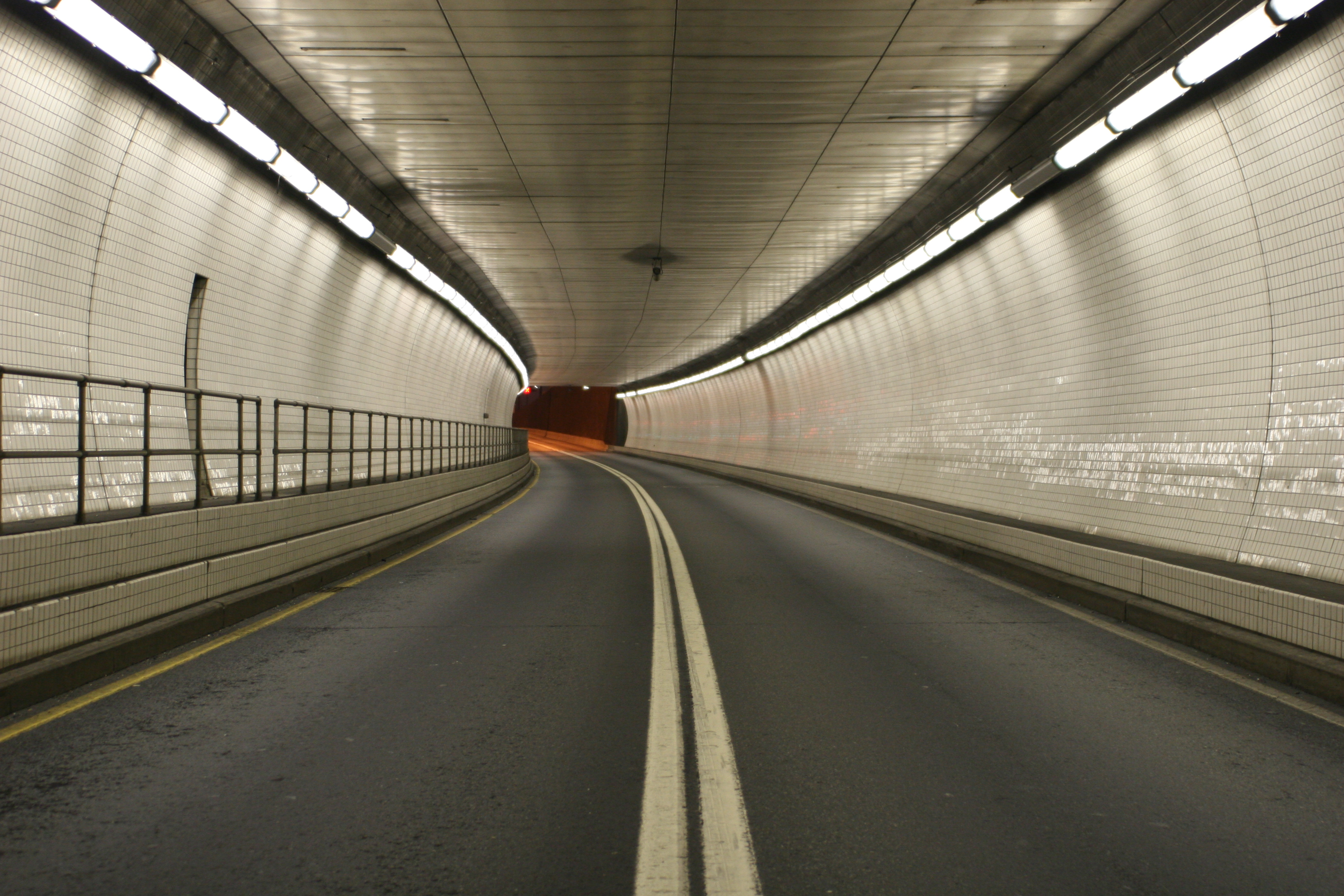
Fort McHenry Tunnel

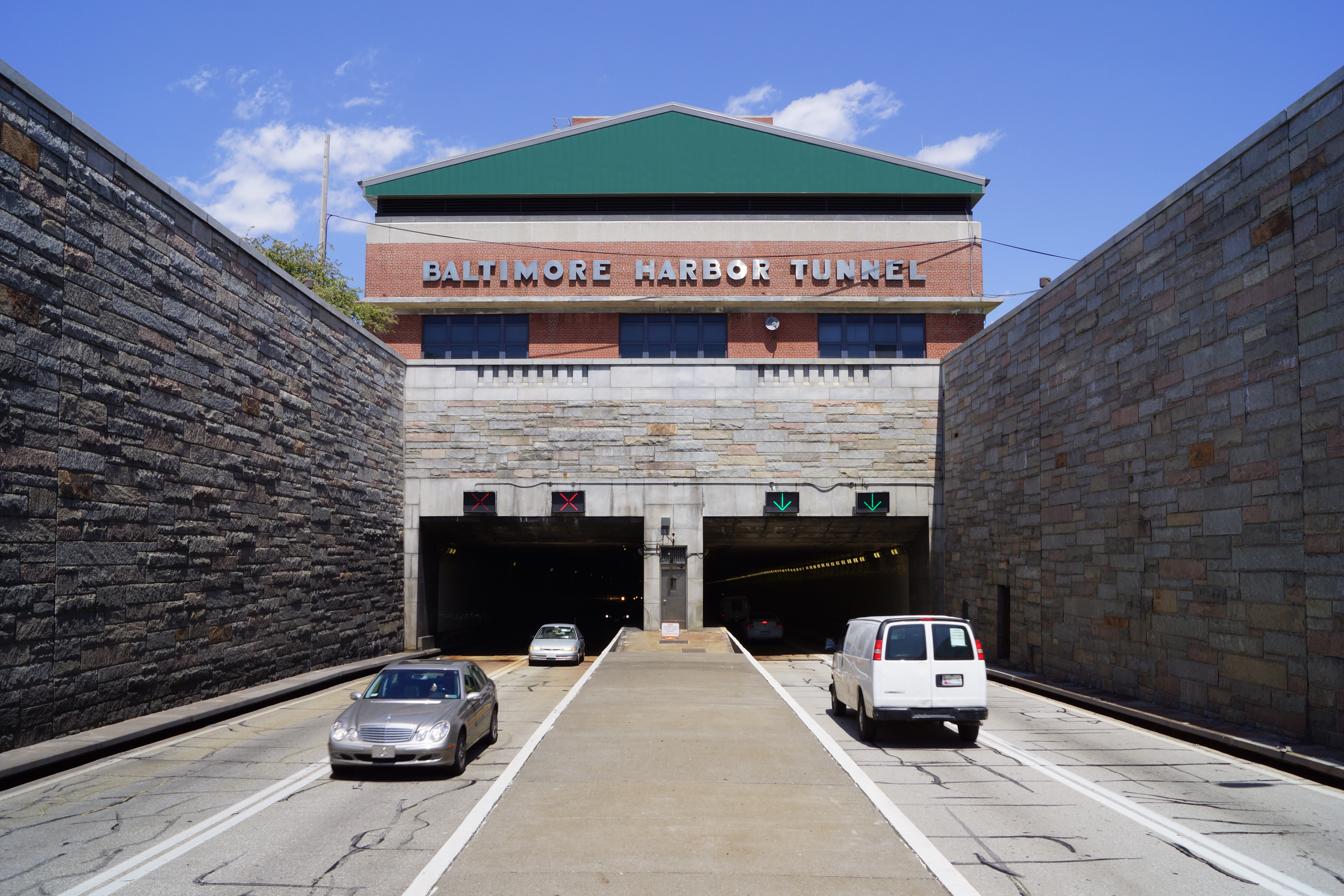
Baltimore Harbor Tunnel

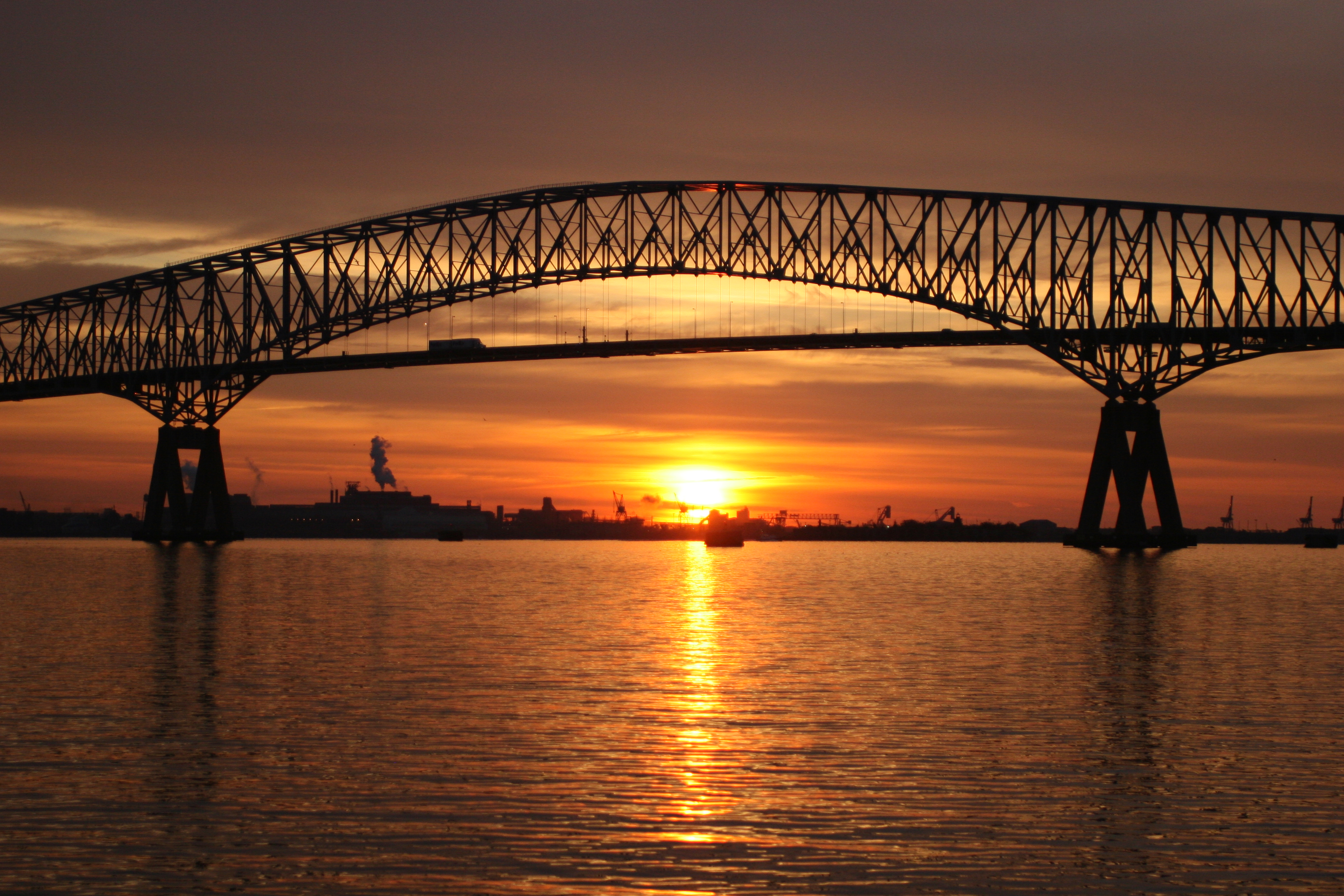
Francis Scott Key Bridge

=== Toll facilities ===
The MDTA operates eight toll facilities:

- Thomas J. Hatem Memorial Bridge, which carries U.S. Route 40 (US 40) across the Susquehanna River between Harford and Cecil counties
- William Preston Lane Jr. Memorial Bridge (Chesapeake Bay Bridge), which carries US 50/US 301 across the Chesapeake Bay between Anne Arundel and Queen Anne's counties
- Francis Scott Key Bridge, which carried I-695, the Baltimore Beltway, over the outer portions of the Baltimore Harbor. The bridge was partially destroyed on March 26, 2024.
- Governor Harry W. Nice Memorial Bridge, which carries US 301 across the Potomac River between Charles County, Maryland, and King George County, Virginia
- John F. Kennedy Memorial Highway, the 50-mile (80 km) section of I-95 that traverses northeastern Maryland from the Baltimore city line to the Delaware state line
- Fort McHenry Tunnel, which carries I-95 under the Baltimore Harbor
- Baltimore Harbor Tunnel, which carries I-895 under the Baltimore Harbor
- Maryland Route 200, the Intercounty Connector

Although the John F. Kennedy Memorial Highway is referred to as a toll road, tolls are only collected at a gantry located a mile north of the Millard E. Tydings Memorial Bridge over the Susquehanna River, for northbound traffic only. Vehicles that do not traverse this section, and all southbound vehicles, do not pay a toll.

In September 2017, Governor Larry Hogan announced a plan to widen the Baltimore-Washington Parkway by four lanes, adding express toll lanes to the median, as part of a $9 billion proposal to widen roads in Maryland. The project would be a public-private partnership with private companies responsible for constructing, operating, and maintaining the lanes. As part of the proposal, the portion of the parkway owned by the National Park Service would be transferred to the Maryland Transportation Authority.

=== Intercounty Connector ===
Maryland Route 200, the Intercounty Connector (ICC), links areas of Montgomery County and Prince George's County between Interstate 370 at Shady Grove and Interstate 95 in Laurel with an 18 mi (29.0 km) east–west limited-access highway. The $2.4 billion project was financed by MDTA, with the Maryland State Highway Administration serving as the project manager for engineering and construction.

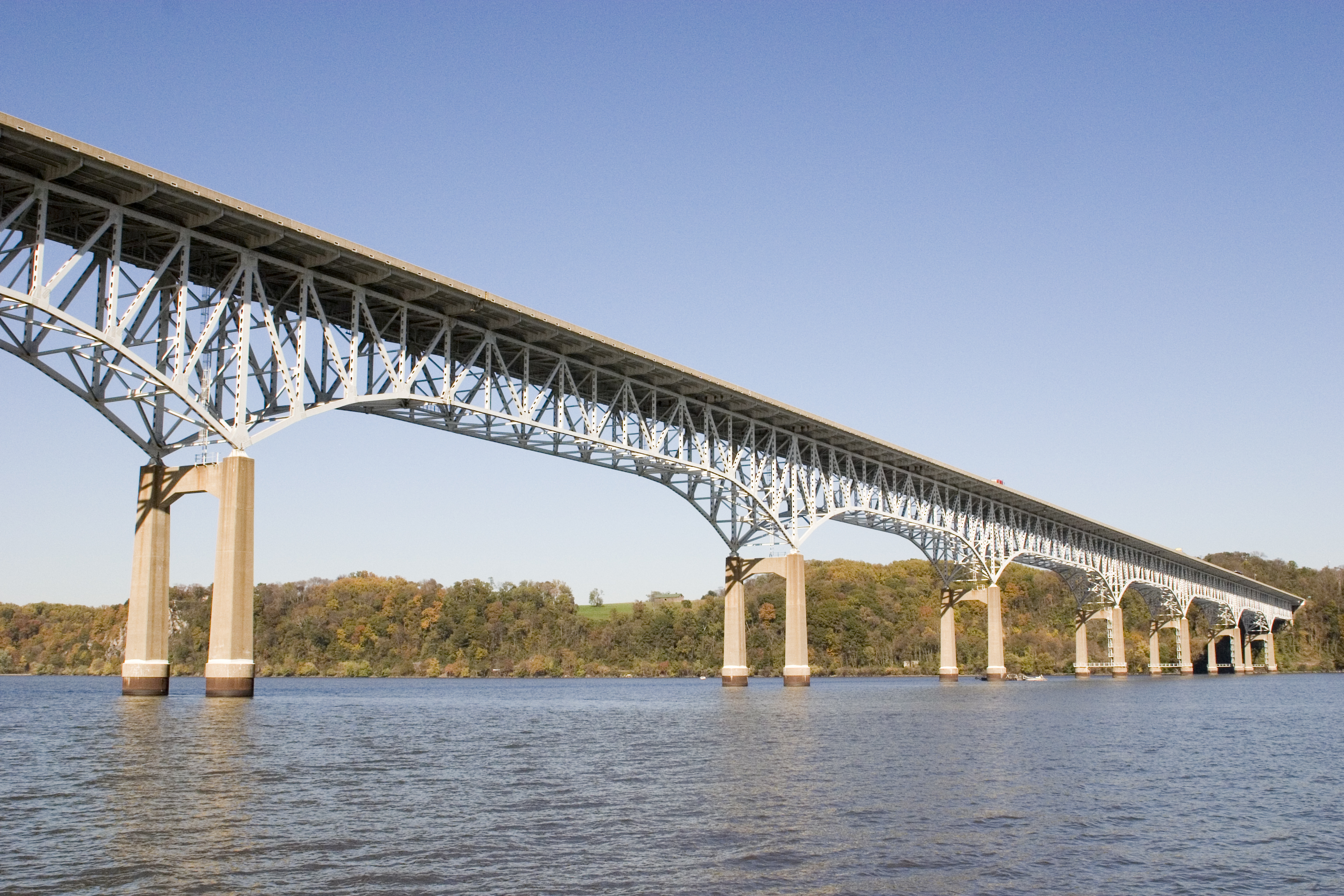
Tydings Bridge

When the first segment of the ICC opened on February 23, 2011, it became the first toll facility in Maryland with fully automated toll collection. Connecting Interstate 370 with Maryland Route 97, the first segment is 5.65 miles (9.09 km) long.

=== Express toll lanes ===
The MDTA began construction of the I-95 express toll lanes on a congested portion of Interstate 95, north of Downtown Baltimore, in May 2005. Now completed, the new toll system extends for 8 mi (12.9 km), from the east side of Baltimore City, at the I-895 split, into Baltimore County, north of Maryland Route 43 in White Marsh. This segment of the John F. Kennedy Memorial Highway (Interstate 95) has two Express Toll and four general purpose lanes in each direction. Tolls for using the Express Toll lanes vary, depending on traffic conditions, to reduce congestion. The general purpose lanes continue to operate toll-free.

=== Other facilities ===
The MDTA has owned the Canton Railroad, which operates as a for-profit enterprise, since 1987.

== M-Tag ==
M-TAG refers to the first generation of Electronic Toll Collection (ETC) system used in the state of Maryland by MDTA from 1999 to 2001. The request for proposal for the system was issued by the authority in 1995. The contractor awarded the contract for the state of Maryland that developed the M-TAG software was Lockheed Martin IMS Division.

M-TAG / E-ZPass is an electronic toll-collection system available at all MDTA Toll facilities: the Baltimore Harbor Tunnel, the Fort McHenry Tunnel, and the Francis Scott Key Bridge. When it came on line in 1999, the system was known as M-TAG. As of October 2001 the system became reciprocal with the other E-ZPass Toll agencies and Maryland then renamed its system to E-ZPass. At that time the JFK Memorial Highway joined, followed by the William Preston Lane Memorial (Bay) Bridge and the Harry W. Nice Bridge, and the Thomas J. Hatem Bridge was the last to come up in April 2002. E-ZPass allows a customer to drive from North Carolina to Maine and Illinois without stopping to pay tolls. A driver receives a small radio frequency transponder to place on the inside of a vehicle's windshield. Equipment in the toll lanes records the transactions, and trips are automatically deducted from the customer's account.

== Toll increases ==
A two-part toll increase became effective at all Maryland toll facilities on October 1, 2011, and July 1, 2013. The toll increase was proposed by the Authority's board on June 2, 2011. The changes were expected to raise an additional $77 million during the first fiscal year after their implementation. Additional revenue was considered necessary by the board to expand highway capacity and rehabilitate aging infrastructure.

The previous toll increase was in 2009, but only affected vehicles with three or more axles. The previous increase for passenger vehicles was in 2003.
