= Ferry crash =

"Ferry crash" may refer to:

- 2003 Staten Island Ferry crash, during which a ferry crashed into a concrete pier.
- Queen of Oak Bay, which drifted into a marina.
- MV Queen of the North, which ran aground.
- Sinking of MV Sewol, which capsized and sank
