= Francis Scott Key Bridge collapse =

2024 bridge collapse near Baltimore, Maryland, US

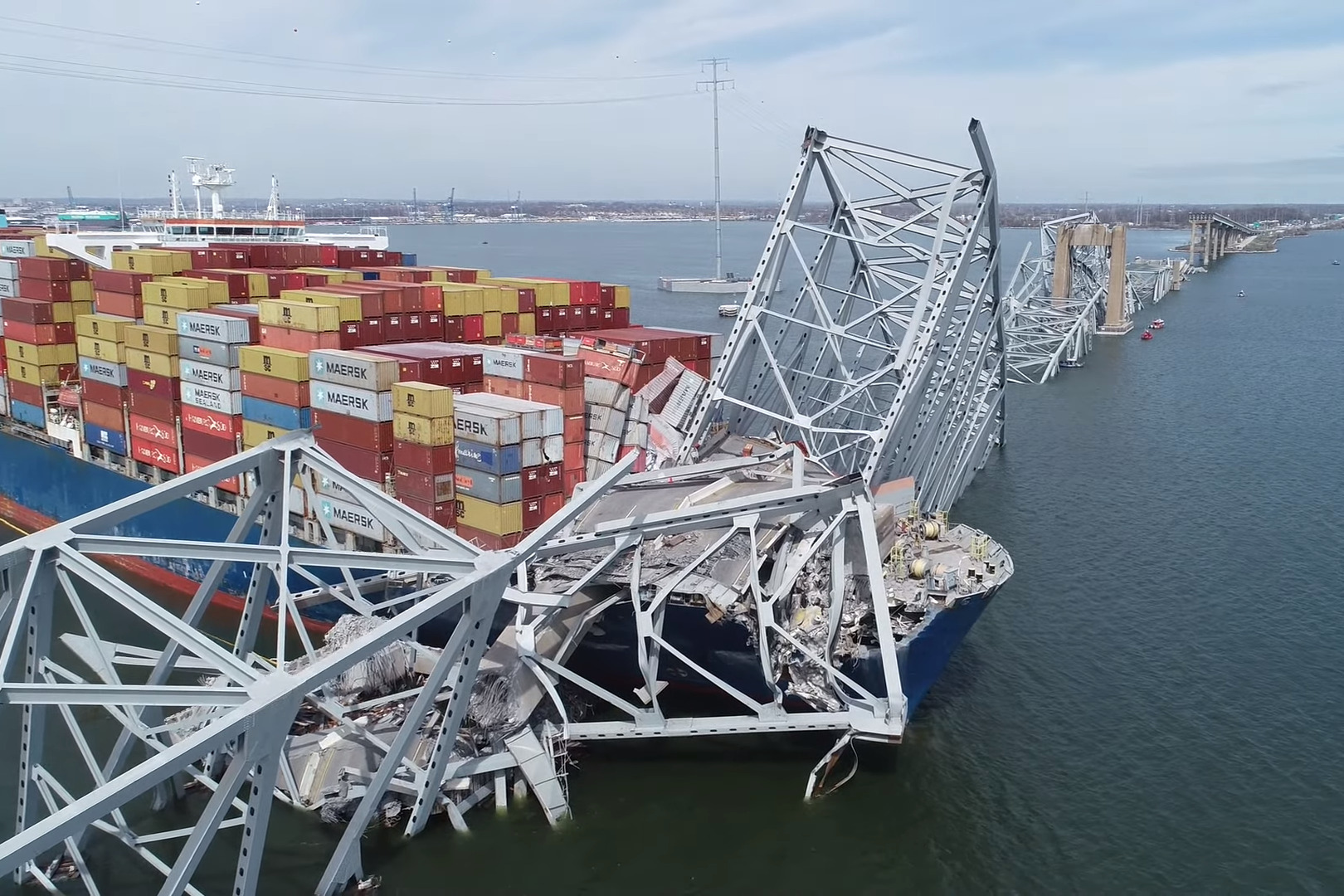
- Dali under one of the collapsed segments of the bridge
- Date: March 26, 2024; 2 years ago
- Time: 1:28:49 a.m. EDT (05:28:49 UTC)
- Location: Baltimore metropolitan area, Maryland, United States; 39°12′56″N 76°31′47″W
- Type: Bridge collapse
- Cause: Loss of propulsion on ship, leading to collision (Note: A crash between two moving vessels is a collision; a crash between a moving vessel and a stationary object, such as a bridge, is an allision. Maritime law treats the two differently: in the latter, the moving vessel is generally presumed to be at fault. This usually makes it easier to prove liability, shortening post-crash legal wrangling.) with pier and subsequent collapse of the bridge truss
- Deaths: 6
- Injuries: 2+
- Property damage: Collapse of bridge spans; Damage to Dali and its cargo; At least seven vehicles submerged

On March 26, 2024, the main spans and the three nearest northeast approach spans of the Francis Scott Key Bridge across the Patapsco River in the Baltimore metropolitan area of Maryland, United States, collapsed after one of the bridge piers was struck by the container ship Dali, which had suffered catastrophic power outages that impaired its control systems. Six members of a maintenance crew working on the roadway were killed, one was rescued from the river, and an inspector was rescued from the remaining structure.

The collapse blocked most shipping to and from the Port of Baltimore for 11 weeks. Maryland Governor Wes Moore called the event a "global crisis" that affected more than 8,000 jobs. The economic impact of the closure of the waterway was estimated at $15 million per day.

Maryland officials have said they plan to replace the bridge by late 2030; initial cost estimates of $1.7 billion to $1.9 billion were later revised to $4.3 billion to $5.2 billion.

== Background ==
Dali, though larger than most earlier ships, carries less than half the cargo of today's largest container ships. Bigger ships can cause bigger disasters, such as the 1,300-foot (400 m) Taiwanese-flagged vessel Ever Given in the 2021 Suez Canal obstruction.

The Francis Scott Key Bridge was a steel arch-shaped continuous truss bridge, the second-longest in the United States and third-longest in the world. Opened in 1977, the 1.6-mile (2.6 km; 1.4 nmi) bridge ran northeast from Hawkins Point, Baltimore, to Sollers Point in Dundalk in Baltimore County, Maryland. Before being damaged, it carried Interstate 695, a beltway around Baltimore; its four lanes (two in each direction) were used by some 34,000 vehicles each day, including 3,000 trucks, many of which hauled hazardous materials barred from the two harbor tunnels.

The bridge crossed one of the busiest shipping routes in the United States: the lower Patapsco River, which connects the Port of Baltimore to the Chesapeake Bay and the Atlantic Ocean. In 2023, the port handled more than 444,000 passengers and 52.3 million tons of foreign cargo valued at $80 billion. It was the second-largest U.S. port for coal, and had been the leading port for automobiles and light trucks for 13 straight years, handling more than 847,000 vehicles in 2023. It employed 15,000 people and indirectly supported 140,000 others, annually helping to generate $3.3 billion in wages and salaries, $2.6 billion in business revenue, and $400 million in state and local tax revenue.

MV Dali is a container ship registered in Singapore, and at the time of the collision was operated by Synergy Marine Group and owned by Grace Ocean Private Ltd, both based in Singapore. A Neopanamax vessel completed in 2015, Dali has a length of 980 feet (300 m), a 157-foot (48 m) beam, and a 40-foot (12.2 m) draft. Danish shipping company Maersk chartered Dali upon its delivery. Once in service, Dali underwent 27 inspections at ports globally, including two in 2023: one in June in San Antonio, Chile, where a fuel-pressure gauge was repaired, and the second in September by the U.S. Coast Guard in New York, which found no problems.

In March 2024, Dali was crewed by 20 Indian nationals and one Sri Lankan. The ship traveled from Panama to New York, arriving on March 19, then sailed to the Virginia International Gateway in Portsmouth, Virginia. The ship left Virginia on March 22 and the following day arrived in Baltimore, where it underwent engine maintenance. An anonymous source told the Associated Press that an alarm on the ship's refrigerated containers went off while the ship was docked, likely due to an inconsistent power supply.

When the bridge was completed in 1977, the largest container ships could hold 2,000 to 3,000 twenty-foot equivalent unit (TEU) containers. In the 2000s, the governments of Maryland and Baltimore, which relied on port operations to replace lost manufacturing jobs, seized the opportunity provided by the Panama Canal's expansion: they installed new cranes and dredged the harbor to accommodate the up-to-14,000-TEU vessels that began passing through the canal in 2016. At the time of its collision, Dali was loaded nearly to its 10,000-TEU capacity with 4,700 forty-foot containers.

In 1980, a ship roughly one-third the size of Dali struck and lightly damaged one of the bridge's piers. After the bridge collapsed in 2024, anonymous former agency officials told The Washington Post that the Maryland Transportation Authority (MDTA) did not consider studying the possibility of a collision with a larger ship, and instead spent decades studying how terrorists might attack the bridge after the September 11 attacks or inspecting for structural flaws similar to those that caused the I-35W Mississippi River bridge collapse in 2007. In 2018, the World Association for Waterborne Transport Infrastructure noted that ships frequently hit bridges but rarely destroy them; between 1960 and 2015, thousands of barges and ships collided with U.S. bridges, destroying 18 of them.

Federal regulations require national highway bridges to conform to standards established by the American Association of State Highway and Transportation Officials, but AASHTO did not specify how strong bridges should be to withstand ship collisions until 1994. Federal regulations for bridge protection systems from ship collisions were updated in 1991 after the Sunshine Skyway Bridge collapse in 1980, but existing bridges were exempted by a grandfather clause, and the Francis Scott Key Bridge piers lacked the level of fender system or island barriers required of newer bridges. However, engineering experts debate whether such bridge protection systems could have prevented the collapse, given Dali's size. The preliminary National Transportation Safety Board (NTSB) report noted that inspections conducted in March 2021 and May 2023 to National Bridge Inspection Standards found the bridge in satisfactory condition.

== Collapse ==
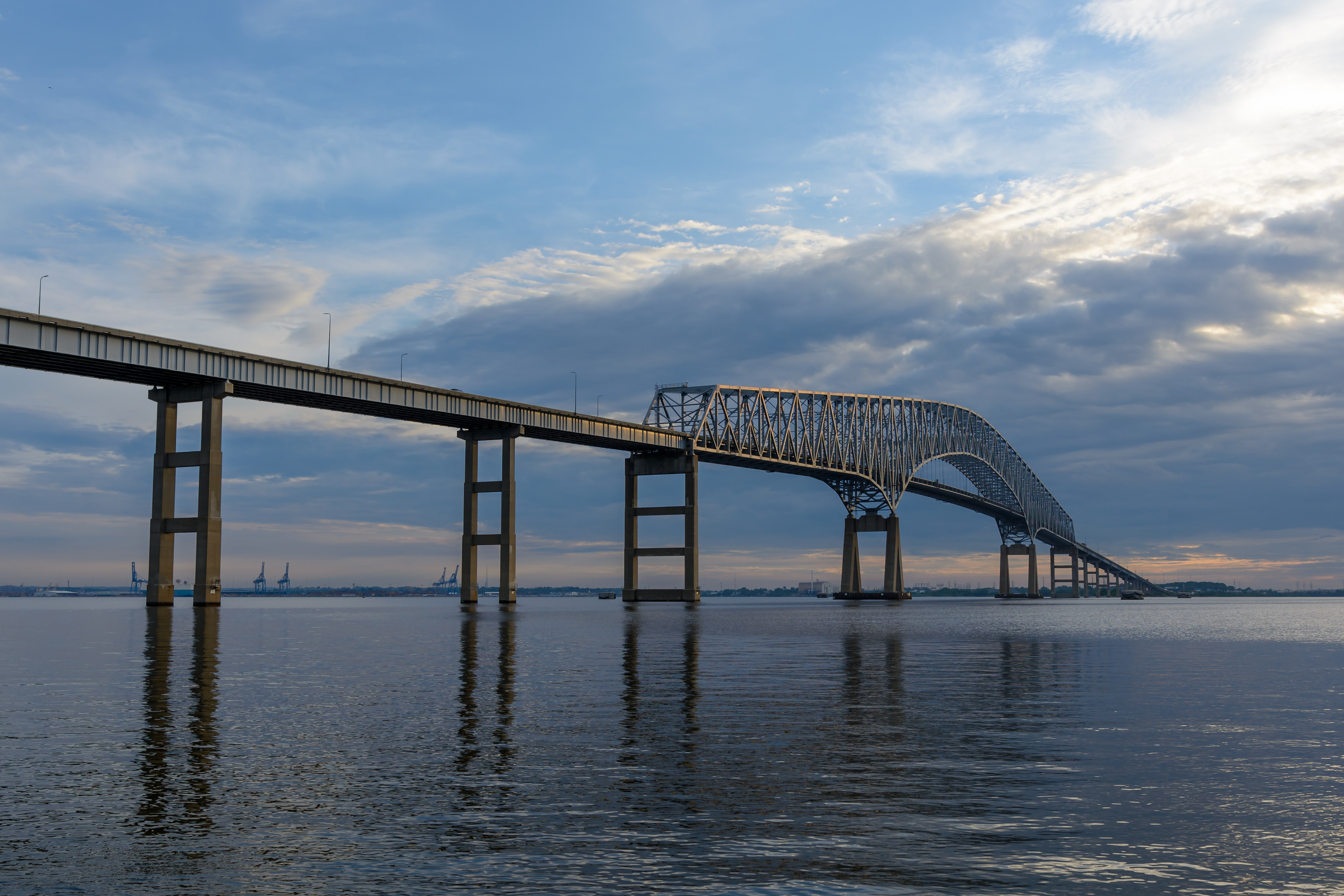
Upstream view of the bridge in 2015; Dali hit the fourth pier from left.

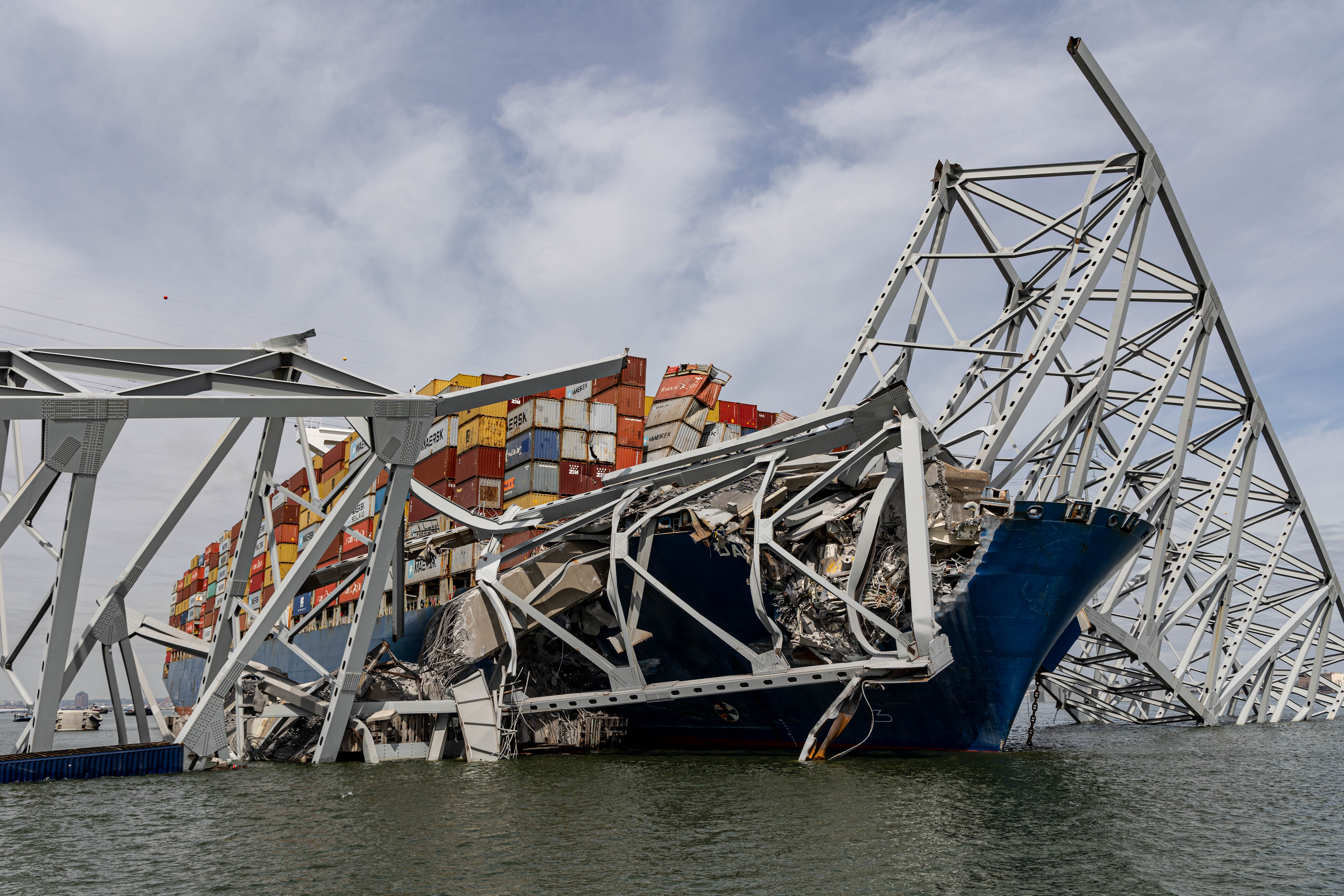
MV Dali immobilized by the wreckage

Dali left the Port of Baltimore at 12:44 a.m. EDT (04:44 UTC) on Tuesday, March 26, 2024, bound for Colombo, Sri Lanka. The ship had two local harbor pilots on board. Following standard operating procedure in Baltimore, tugboats that piloted the ship from its berth were released once the ship was in the channel. At 1:24 a.m., the ship suffered a "complete blackout" and began to drift out of the shipping channel; a backup generator supported electrical systems but did not provide power to the propulsion system. At 1:27 a.m., a mayday call was made from the ship, notifying the Maryland Department of Transportation that the crew had lost propulsion and control of the vessel and that a collision with the bridge was possible.

One of the pilots requested that traffic be stopped from crossing the bridge immediately. The ship's lights went out and came on again some moments later, then again went off and returned just before impact as smoke once again began rising from the funnel. At the pilot's request, the MDTA Police dispatch asked officers to stop traffic in both directions at 1:27:53 a.m.; outer loop (eastbound/northbound) traffic was stopped at the south side after 20 seconds, while inner loop (westbound/southbound) traffic was stopped at the north side by 1:28:58 a.m., around the time of the collapse. The Maritime and Port Authority of Singapore (MPA) reported that the ship dropped anchor before hitting the bridge, as part of its emergency procedures.

At 1:28:45 a.m., the ship struck the southwest pier of the central truss arch span, at roughly 8 knots (9.2 mph; 15 km/h). AIS data showed the ship traveling at a speed of 8.7 knots (10.0 mph; 16.1 km/h) at 1:25 a.m. before departing the channel and slowing to 6.8 knots (7.8 mph; 12.6 km/h) by the time of the collision two minutes later.

Within seconds of the collision, the bridge broke apart in several places, leaving sections protruding from the water and the roadway's approaches cut off. The main span fell onto the ship's bow and a section of it came to rest there. The bridge strike and partial collapse were recorded on video.

Multiple vehicles were on the bridge at the time it collapsed, though initially no one was believed to be inside them. Workers were repairing potholes on the bridge and were in their vehicles on a break at the time of the collapse. A resident living near the bridge recalled being awakened by deep rumbling that shook his residence for several seconds following the collapse, which he said "felt like an earthquake".

Emergency teams began receiving 911 calls at 1:30 a.m. The Baltimore Police Department was alerted to the collapse at 1:35 a.m. Large rescue and recovery efforts began. The Coast Guard deployed boats and a helicopter as part of rescue efforts. Fifty public safety divers in eight teams were dispatched to search for people who fell into the river.

=== Timeline ===
This timeline is based mostly on the National Transportation Safety Board's preliminary analysis of events from the ship's voyage data recorder, the Maryland Transportation Authority Police log, and the NTSB's Marine Investigation Report MIR-25-40

Time (a.m. EDT)	Event
00:36	Dali departs Seagirt Marine Terminal.
01:07	Dali enters Fort McHenry Channel, and the first tugboat leaves the ship.
01:08	The second tugboat leaves the ship, and the engines are set to "slow ahead" (8–10 knots (9.2–11.5 mph; 15–19 km/h)).
01:24:59	With Dali approximately 3,200 feet (980 m) from the bridge and underway at a heading of 142° at 8.9 knots (10.2 mph; 16.5 km/h), the ship loses low-voltage (LV) power, causing a loss of lights, steering, fuel pumps, cooling pumps, and bow thrusters.
01:25:03	The voyage data recorder (VDR) ceases to record ship systems, but continues to record audio.
01:25:08	The main engine shuts down, but generators 3 and 4 remain operational.
01:25:47	Dali starts turning to starboard, and the helmsman attempts to turn hard to port, not realizing that the rudder was not operational.
01:25:58	The ship's electrician manually closes the breaker on the transformer that converts high voltage to low voltage, restoring LV power and causing the lights to come back on. VDR parametric data recording resumes 4 seconds later. The flushing pump, which was being used to supply the two running generators with fuel, does not start because it was not set to restart automatically. With the ship 2,430 feet (740 m), or 2.5 ship lengths, from the Key Bridge, the pilot calls the Association of Maryland Pilots dispatcher and tells them to have the police stop traffic on the bridge.
01:26:10	The emergency generator turns on, restoring steering power, and the helmsman sets the rudder to port 20°. Dense black smoke begins to pour from Dali's funnel
01:26:18	The ship reaches its maximum rate of turn away from the bridge, 7.5°/minute.
01:26:38	The pilot sends a radio call requesting tugboat assistance.
01:26:44	The pilot association dispatcher informs the Maryland Department of Transportation (MDTA) duty officer of Dali's lack of steering. One tugboat begins heading towards the Dali.
01:27:02	The pilot orders the port anchor be dropped.
01:27:04	Generators 3 and 4 begin underperforming due to a lack of fuel. The ship's power management system attempts to start generator 2, but is not able to get it online before the other generators fail. Both high and low voltage circuit breakers open. Only limited lighting, steering, and other equipment powered by the emergency generator remain operational.
01:27:07	Generator 2 comes online providing high voltage power, but low voltage power is not restored because the circuit breakers remain open.
01:27:23	The pilot commands hard to port, and the pilot in training makes a distress call over VHF radio.
01:27:36	The electrician manually closes the breakers, restoring LV power to the lighting, main engine, and additional steering pumps. The main engine, which needed to be restarted manually, remains off. An engineer is sent to manually restart the flushing pump that supplies generators 3 and 4.
01:27:46	With Dali approximately 939 feet (286 m) from the bridge, the pilot commands the bow thruster be set to "full to port". The bow thruster is not operational because its pumps had not been manually restarted.
01:27:53	The MDTA duty officer dispatches units to shut down the bridge.
01:27:55	The flushing pump is restarted, but the bridge is informed that crews were unable to release the brake to drop the anchor.
01:28:10	Dali leaves the Fort McHenry Channel and begins to impact the mud near bridge pier 17.
01:28:21	An MDTA officer blocks off the north end of the Key Bridge, and tells the duty officer that he would warn the constructions crews once another officer was able to relieve him.
01:28:42	The anchor brake is manually released, allowing the anchor to be dropped.
01:29:09	Dali collides with a support pillar of the bridge at 6.4 knots (7.4 mph; 11.9 km/h).
01:29:22	Pier 17 collapses, with the main spans and their support piers following a few seconds later.
01:29:27	MDTA reports collapse of bridge.
01:29:37	Pilot reports collapse of bridge.
01:29:51	All vehicular approaches to the bridge reported shut down.

=== Damage ===
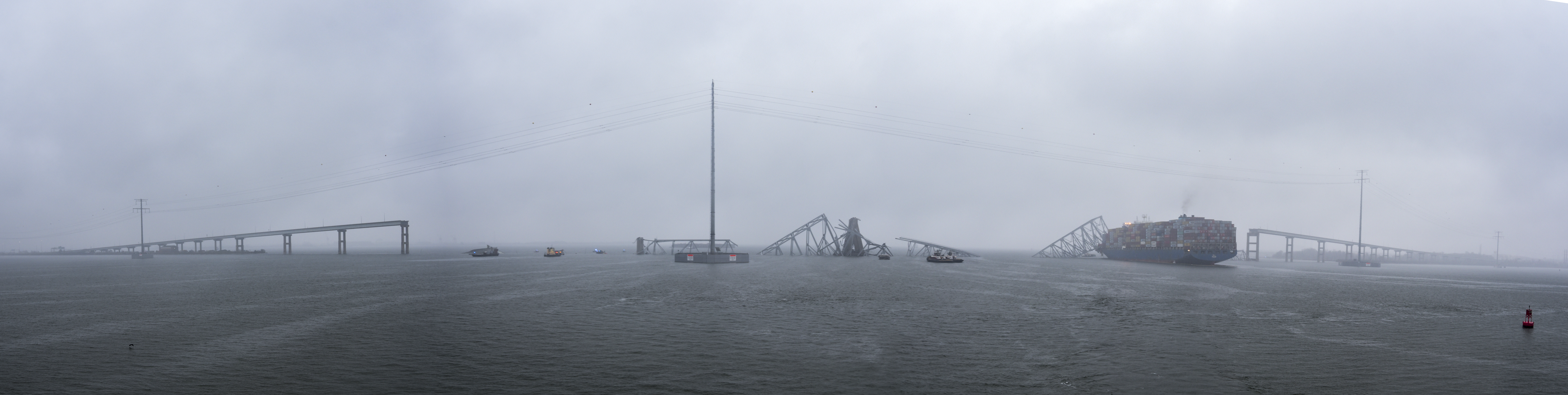
The collapsed portion of the bridge comprised the three spans under the metal truss, and three others to the northeast (left of the images, in Dundalk, Maryland; right is Hawkins Point, Baltimore).

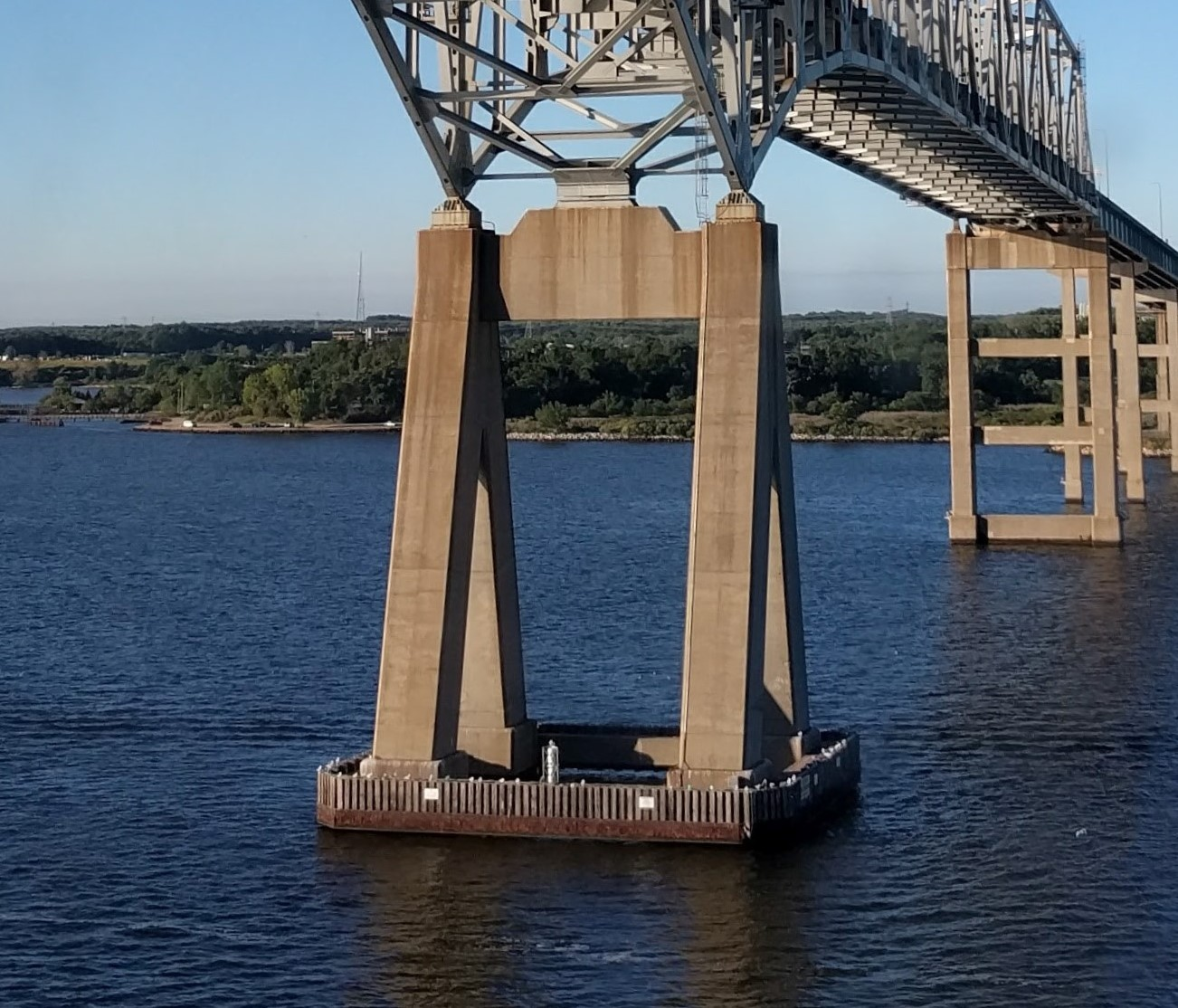
2016 photo of the pier struck by the ship

Aerial view of the damage

Sentinel-2 satellite images of Baltimore Harbor

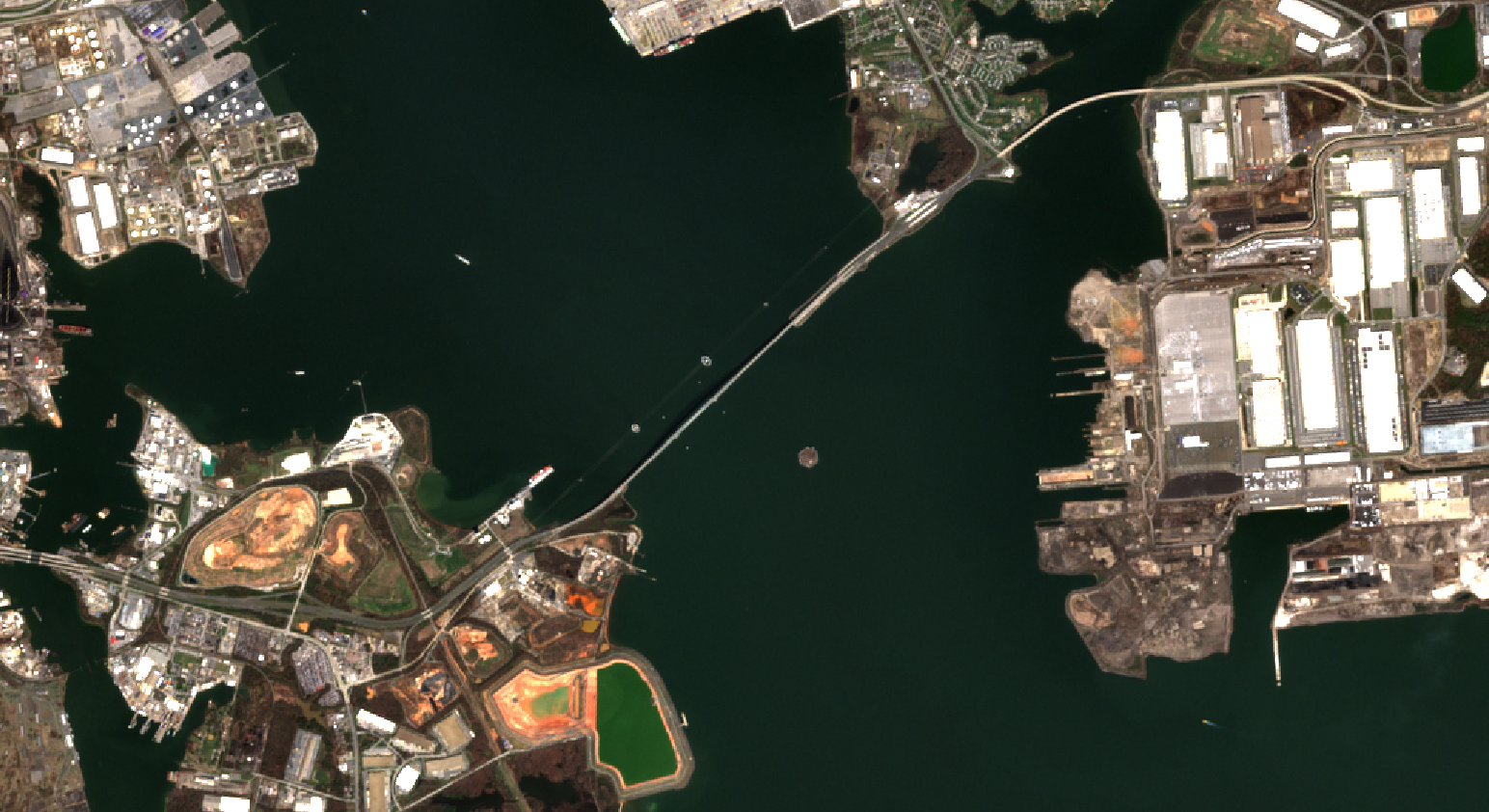
March 25, 2024: one day before the collapse

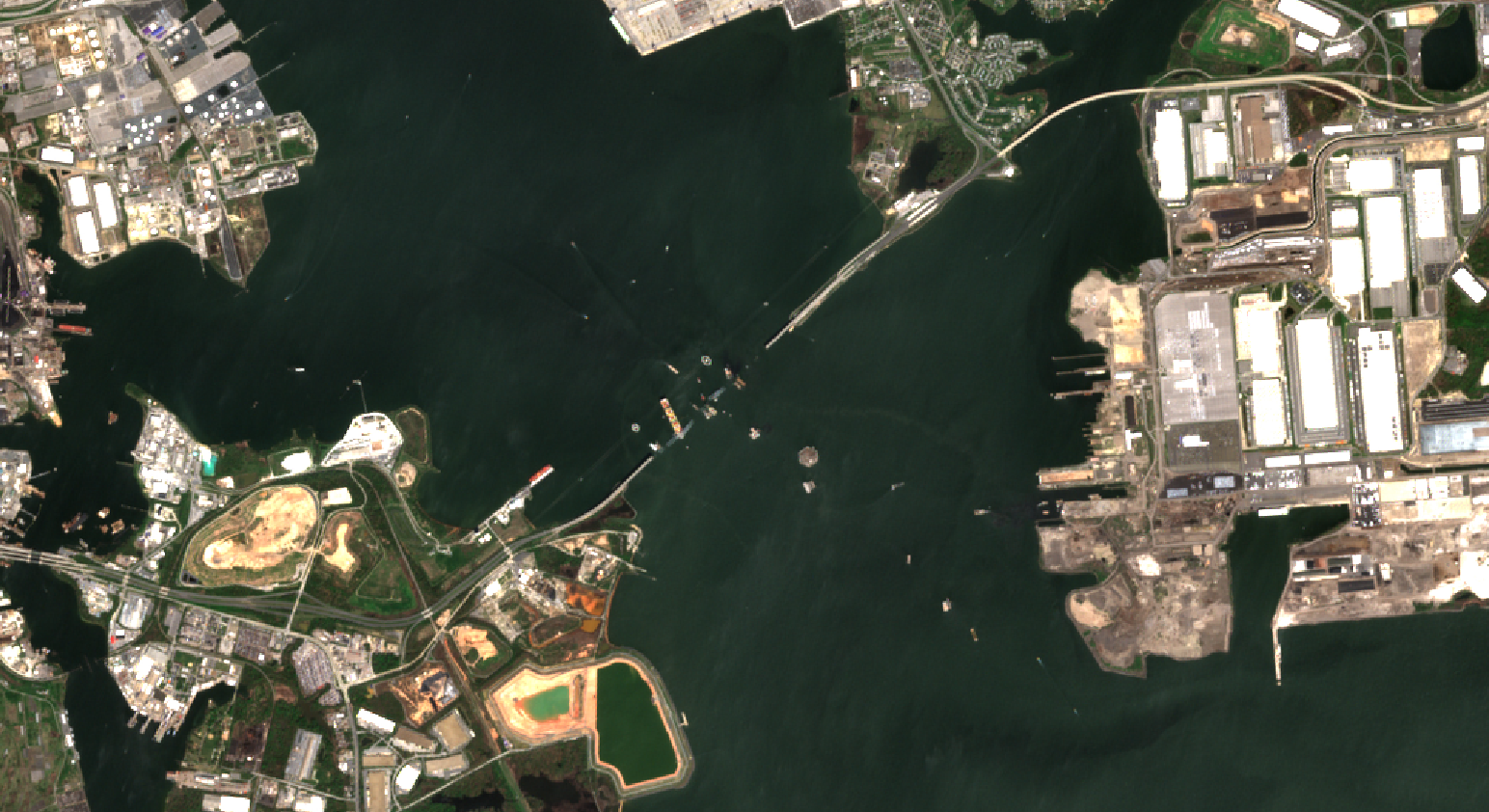
April 14, 2024: 19 days after the collapse

The force of the impact with the pier was estimated to be between 27 and 52 million pounds-force (120 and 230 MN) by The New York Times writers, who used equations from the American Association of State Highway and Transportation Officials publication Guide Specifications and Commentary for Vessel Collision Design of Highway Bridges. In comparison, Saturn V rockets generated 7.9 million pounds-force (35 MN) of thrust at launch.

The bridge's continuous truss relied on its overall structure to maintain integrity; in engineering terms, it was fracture critical, meaning it had no redundancy against removal of support of any particular part of it. The collision destroyed its southwest main truss pier, causing the south and central spans to collapse, which led to the collapse of a northern span. Each failure sequence took seconds, and within 30 seconds the entirety of the trussed spans, and three others, had fallen.

The bridge was determined to be fully compliant with the building code when it collapsed. The bridge had dolphin and fender protection against ship impact, but these protections were insufficient.

Of Dali's 4,700 shipping containers, 13 were damaged in the collision. Two fell into the water, neither of which carried hazardous substances. Dali sustained hull damage above the water line and the ship was impaled by remnants of the bridge superstructure (estimated to be 3,000 to 4,000 tonnes of bridge wreckage), which pressed it against the channel floor. The ship remained watertight, and the shipping company initially claimed there was no water pollution directly from the ship. Authorities installed 2,400 feet (730 m) of water containment booms around the ship after a sheen was detected in the waterway, which was believed to have been produced by 21 US gallons (17 imp gal; 79 L) of oil that leaked from a bow thruster on the ship. On March 27, the NTSB announced an investigation into a hazmat spill resulting from breached containers aboard Dali, including some of the 56 containers that carried about 764 tons of hazardous materials: primarily corrosives, flammable substances (including lithium batteries), and Class 9 materials.

== Casualties ==
NOAA reported a water temperature of 47 °F (8 °C) at the time of the collapse.

Two people were rescued, one from the river in "very serious" condition and the other from the remaining bridge, uninjured. One of those rescued was a Mexican national. The lawyer of one survivor said his client, who was in his car as the bridge collapsed, escaped by manually rolling down his window.

Six people, all part of the maintenance crew working on the bridge, were reported missing and presumed dead after a Coast Guard search was suspended. Their bodies were all recovered, from underwater, by May 7.

On March 27, the bodies of a 35-year-old Mexican national and a 26-year-old Guatemalan national were found inside a red pickup truck 25 feet (7.6 m) below the mid-section of the bridge.

On April 5, the body of a 38-year-old Honduran national was recovered from a submerged vehicle.

On April 14, another body was recovered from a submerged construction vehicle. The family of the victim requested the identity of the deceased be withheld.

By that point, the underwater searches had found five submerged vehicles, including three passenger vehicles and a transit mixer. On April 30, the Maryland State Police announced that they had identified "areas of interest" where the bodies of the two remaining missing victims could be. These areas had been inaccessible to recovery crews, before April 13.

On May 1, a fifth body, belonging to Miguel Angel Luna Gonzalez, 49, of Glen Burnie, was recovered from a red truck that had been among the missing construction vehicles.

On May 7, the sixth and final body, belonging to José Mynor López, 37, of Baltimore, was recovered.

Occupational Safety and Health Administration regulations require that construction companies keep skiffs available at construction sites over waterways. Coast Guard officials said they did not know whether the company that employed the highway workers had one available. Satellite imagery at the time of the bridge collapse does not appear to show one present. The company declined to respond to press inquiries about whether a boat was available.

Dali's crew and the two pilots sustained no serious injuries. One crew member was slightly injured and required some stitches. Groups such as the Baltimore International Seafarers' Center made efforts to support the crew members as they remained on the boat, including providing them with Wi-Fi hotspots.

== Investigation ==
External videos
- Press conference with NTSB Chair Jennifer Homendy, March 26, 2024, C-SPAN
- Board meeting detailing official findings, November 18, 2025

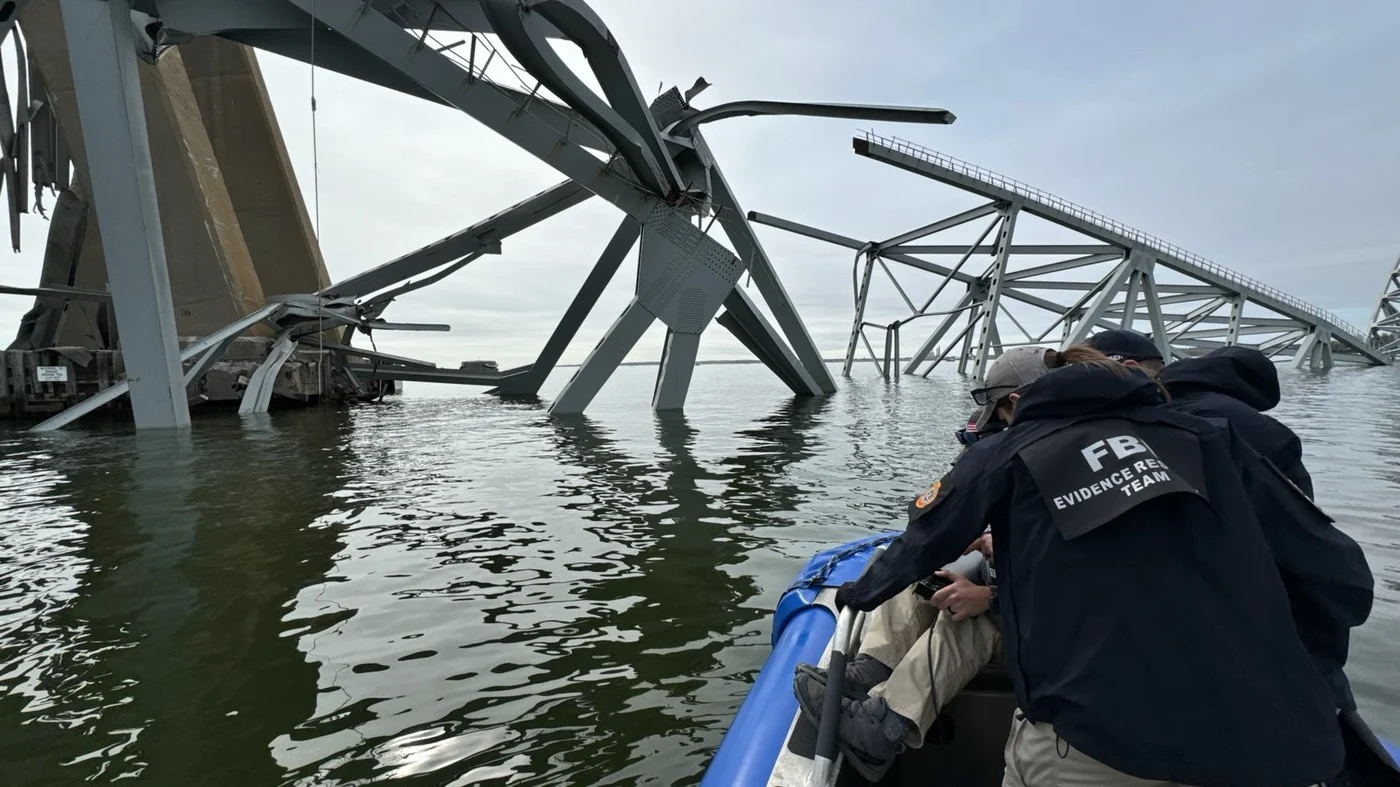
An evidence response team from the FBI examines a segment of the bridge several hours after the collapse. Pictured, March 26, 2024

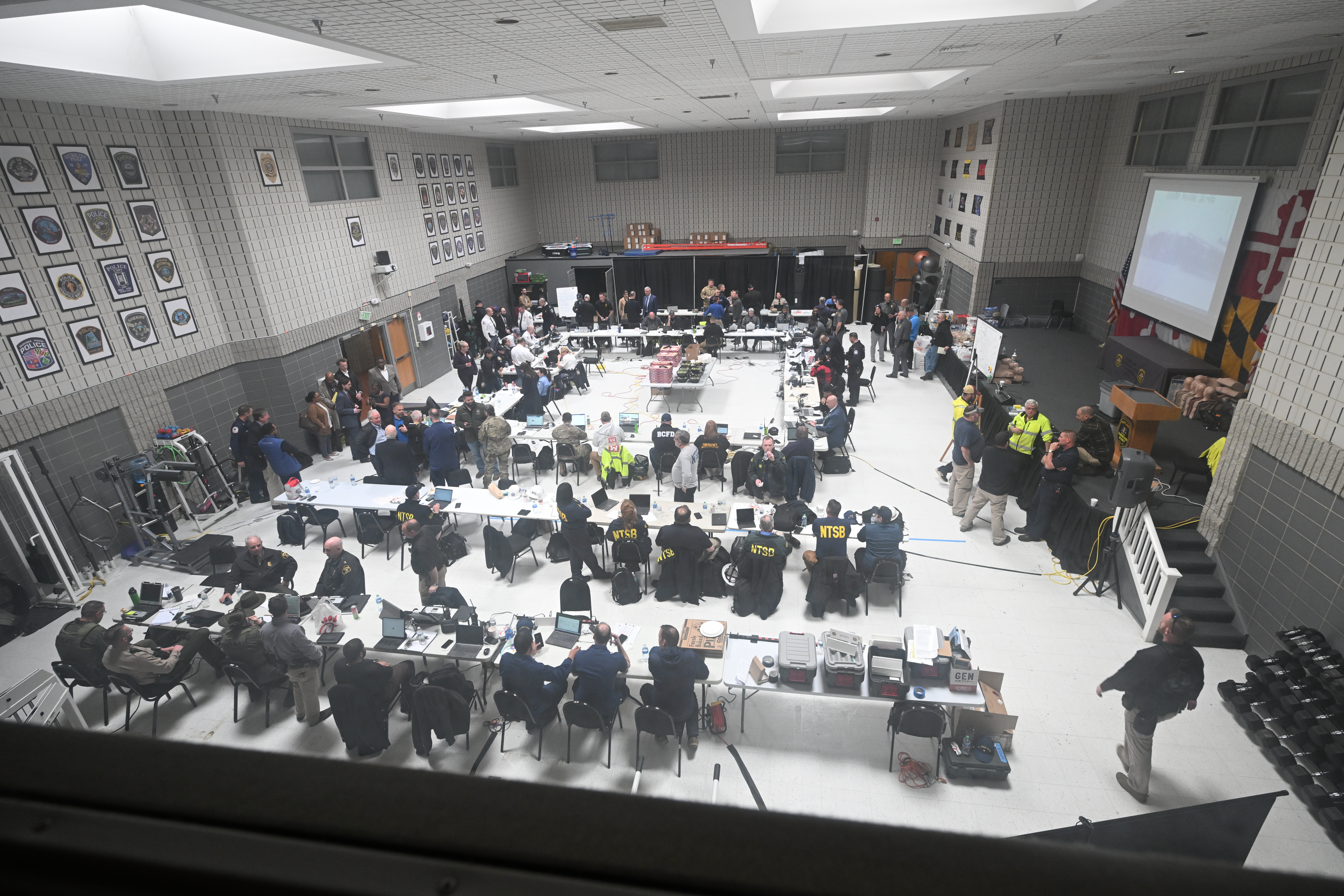
Officials coordinate response and rescue efforts at the Maryland Transportation Authority headquarters on the day of the collapse pictured, March 26, 2024

The NTSB began an investigation and sent a team to the site. The Federal Bureau of Investigation (FBI) was also deployed to the scene, but said that terrorism was not suspected in the incident. On March 27, 2024, a Unified Command Joint Information Center was established to coordinate the investigation and salvage. The command includes members from primary stakeholders, including the U.S. Coast Guard, Maryland Department of the Environment, MDTA, Maryland State Police, and Synergy Marine.

As the flag state, Singapore's Transport Safety Investigation Bureau (TSIB) sent personnel to Baltimore, to help in investigations, alongside the Maryland Port Administration (MPA). The MPA said it offered support to the NTSB and the Office of Marine Safety.

NTSB personnel boarded the ship late on March 26, 2024, and obtained the voyage data recorder (VDR), which would help investigators develop a timeline of events leading up to the collision. Several possible factors were being considered, including the possibility that contaminated fuel or an improper grade of fuel had caused the loss of the ship's power. At a Senate Commerce Committee hearing on April 10, NTSB Chair Jennifer Homendy said the agency would not likely issue its preliminary report until the first week of May. She said investigators were gathering data about the ship's electrical system, examining its circuit breakers with the assistance of Dali shipbuilder Hyundai Heavy Industries, and comparing the bridge's design and pier protection to current regulatory standards.

On April 15, 2024, FBI agents searched Dali in a criminal investigation to establish whether the crew left the port aware that the ship had problems with its electrical or mechanical systems. On May 8, anonymous sources told The Wall Street Journal that the FBI investigation is looking for potential violations of the Seaman's Manslaughter Statute, which can carry up to a 10-year prison sentence for ship officers, crew, ship owners, and charterers when violations result in deaths.

The preliminary NTSB report was released on May 14, 2024. The report stated that the ship had two power outages in port: the first occurred 10 hours before departure when an engine damper (mistakenly closed by a crew member when working on the diesel engine scrubber system) prevented exhaust gas from flowing out of the ship stacks and caused the engine to stall; the second outage occurred when insufficient fuel pressure caused the ship's backup generator to shut off—which led the crew to modify the ship's electrical configuration by switching from a transformer and breaker system that had been in use for several months to a different system on the accident voyage. However, the report did not draw a connection between the in-port outages and the voyage outages, and stated that the NTSB's investigation of the electrical configuration was ongoing. The report also stated that fuel testing found no evidence of contamination. In testimony before the House Transportation Committee on May 15, NTSB Chair Jennifer Homendy stated that the in-port power outages and voyage outages were "mechanically distinct" and that switching circuit breakers after an outage is a common practice, but that changing the electrical configuration may have resulted in the voyage outages.

On September 12, 2024, the NTSB released a 41-page report detailing tests completed on Dali in the weeks after the collapse; it said investigators had found a loose electrical cable in the transformer and breaker system that could have caused electrical problems.

On September 21, 2024, FBI agents in Baltimore boarded Maersk Saltoro, a ship owned by Dali owner Synergy Marine Group. No reason was given publicly for the search of the ship, though experts noted that its make and manufacture was close enough for Maersk Saltoro to be considered a sister ship to Dali.

=== Findings ===
On November 18, 2025, the NTSB released its final report, detailing its findings. It determined the probable cause of the accident to be a loose signal wire 1 in the ship's electrical control center's terminal block 381, which caused a circuit breaker to open that led to both blackouts on the night of the incident. The wire came loose because an improperly attached plastic label prevented its ferrule from being properly inserted into the terminal block's socket spring clamp. The NTSB found that the wire's unreliability could have been detected with available thermography equipment, and recommended that the vessel manager implement a safety management system that incorporates, among other things, routine thermal imaging. The NTSB also recommended that WAGO Corporation, which supplied the terminal blocks, as well as Hyundai Heavy Industries, which installed them, update their documentation to warn about improper label placement impeding wire insertion.

The NTSB found that additional factors prevented the timely recovery of steering capability:

- The main engine had been configured to shut down if cooling water pressure was too low, but the electric cooling water pumps were not able to function when power was lost.
- Fuel was being supplied to the engines by the flushing pump, which was designed only for maintenance tasks and had no redundancies, instead of the supply and booster pumps.
- Circuit breakers had been set to manual mode, not automatic, and it took crew time to find and reset them.
- The backup generator did not attempt to start because sensors indicated that the radiator damper was in the incorrect position, but classification societies only require lockouts on the ventilation dampers.

The NTSB also found as a contributing factor that the Maryland Transportation Authority and many other large bridge owners across the U.S. had made inadequate plans for ship-bridge allisions given the trend of increasing ship sizes in the previous four decades. It recommended increasing adoption of driver warning systems on bridges, which would have helped prevent the loss of life after the allision.

== Impact ==
The debris from the collapse blocked maritime access to virtually the entirety of the Port of Baltimore; nearly 30 ships had signaled the port as their destination, and more than 40 were trapped. Only one part of the Port of Baltimore was unaffected: the Tradepoint Atlantic marine terminal at Sparrows Point, on the seaward side of the Key Bridge. Tradepoint Atlantic said on April 3 that it began preparing for an influx of redirected ships and estimated that it would unload and process 10,000 vehicles over the next 15 days.

Maryland governor Wes Moore declared a state of emergency shortly thereafter, and Maryland Secretary of Transportation Paul Wiedefeld ordered the suspension of all shipping to and from the Port of Baltimore until further notice; trucking facilities remained operational. At 4:15 a.m., the Federal Aviation Administration imposed a 5-nautical-mile (5.8 mi; 9.3 km) temporary flight restriction around the incident site. Maersk, which chartered the vessel, saw the price of its shares decline by about 2% when trading opened at Nasdaq Copenhagen on March 26.

=== Supply chain disruptions ===
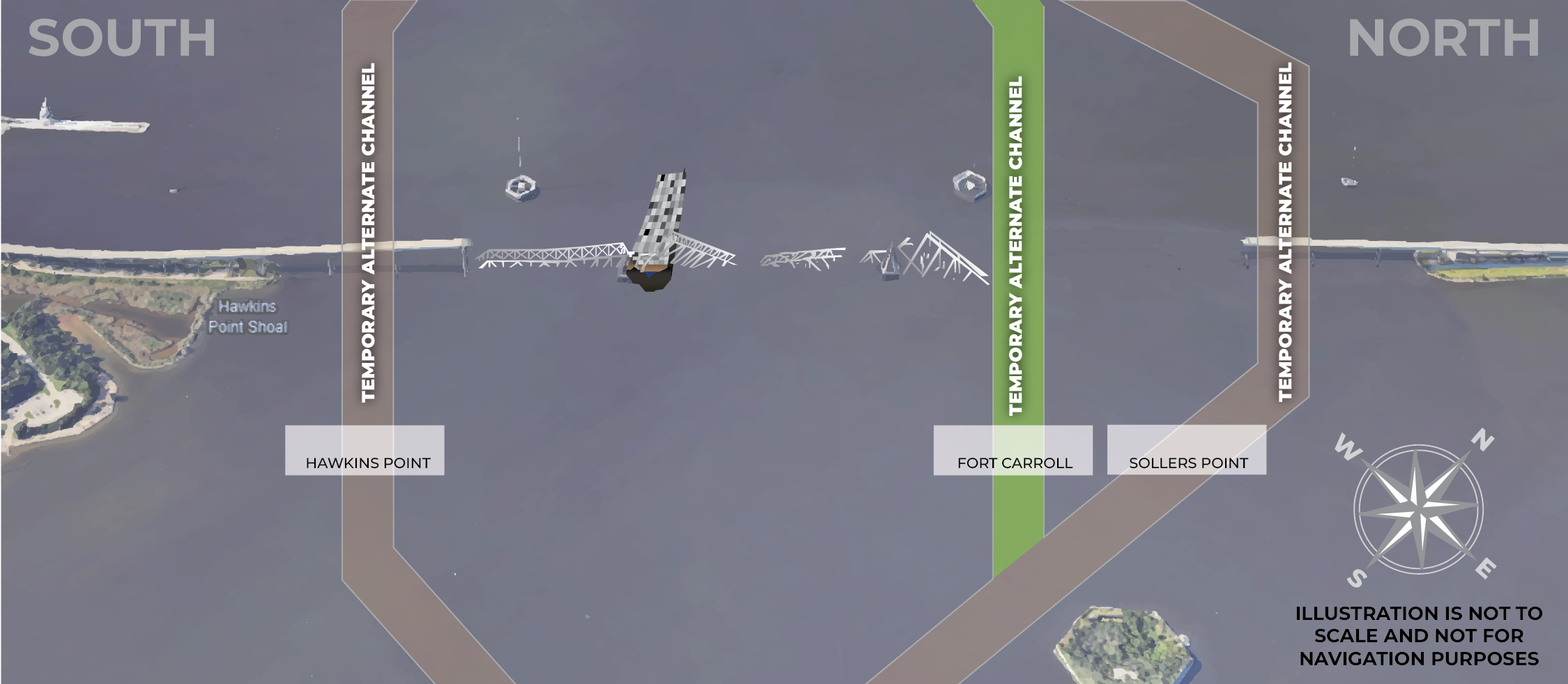
Map of the three temporary channels as of April 20, 2024

The collapse blocked access to all of Baltimore's marine terminals except the Sparrows Point terminal, closing them to shipping. This led shipping lines to seek alternate ports for ships en route to Baltimore and forced shippers to attempt to arrange for land transportation from those ports before unloaded cargoes would incur detention and demurrage charges—i.e., late fees. Four shipping lines—CMA CGM, then COSCO and Evergreen on March 26, and Mediterranean Shipping Company on March 28—declared force majeure, allowing them to terminate their contracts of carriage with clients once cargo is delivered to diversion ports. Maersk, however, announced that it would arrange transport for cargo from diversion ports to its clients.

Stellantis and General Motors said they would divert vehicle imports to other ports, and Toyota reported that some of its exports could be affected. The bridge collapse also isolated the terminals of Mercedes-Benz, CSX at Curtis Bay, and Consol Energy. On April 1, CSX announced a new route for diverted Baltimore imports arriving at the Port of New York and New Jersey; the railroad completed its first shipments of diverted cargo three days later. On April 3, Norfolk Southern announced its own dedicated service to haul diverted imports from New York to Baltimore.

While economists said the port closure was unlikely to reduce U.S. economic growth, Dun & Bradstreet estimated the weekly cost of the supply chain disruptions caused by the port closure to be $1.7 billion. On March 28, New York governor Kathy Hochul and New Jersey governor Phil Murphy offered the use of ports in their states in handling affected cargo shipments to minimize supply chain disruptions.

On May 7, Maersk North America's president said the company would decide within 5 to 10 days whether to restart operations in Baltimore if the channel were reopened by the end of the month.

=== Local effects ===
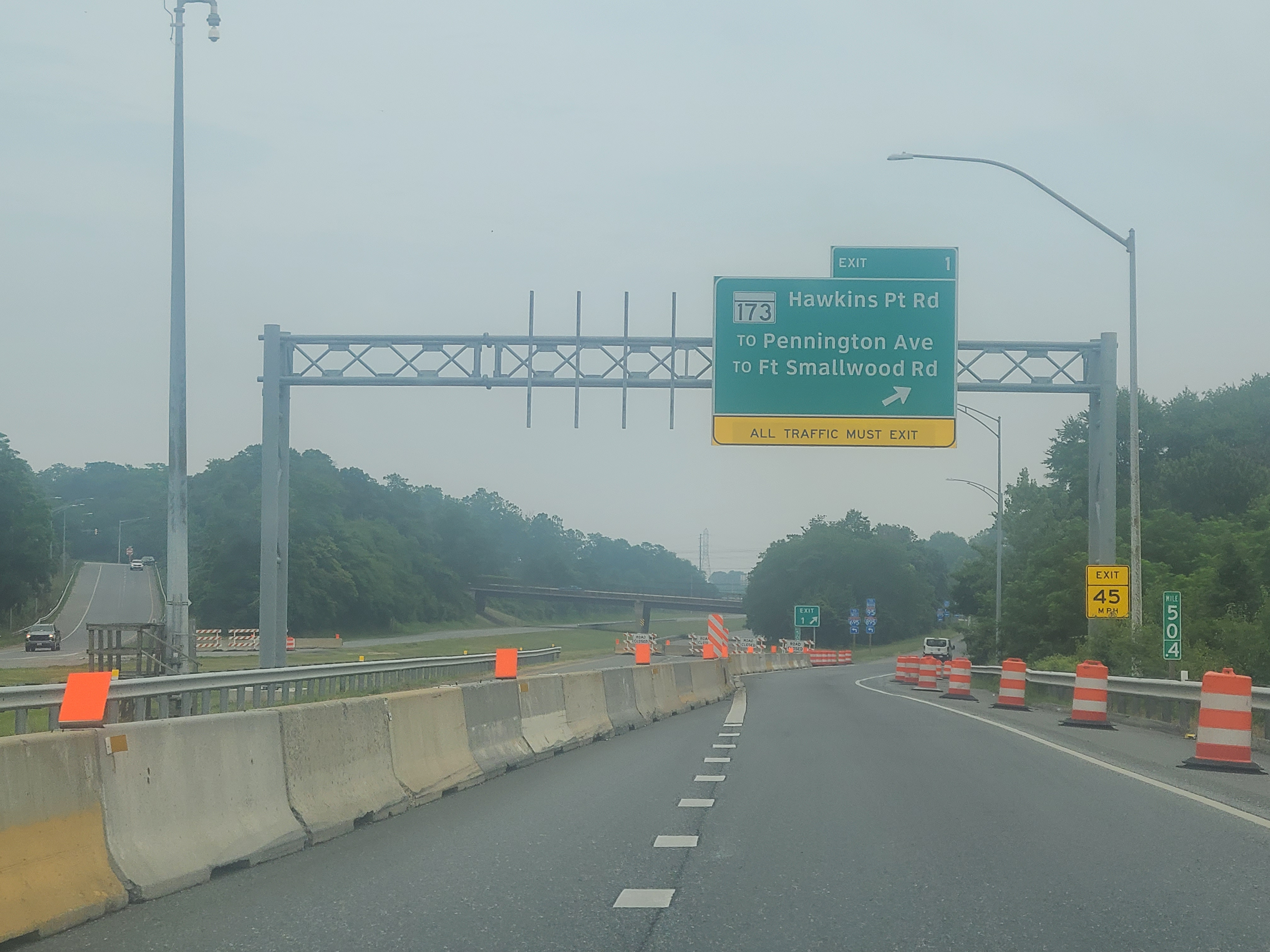
Eastbound I-695 traffic is forced to exit at exit 1 (MD 173). The empty sign mounts on the left formerly held a sign designating the mainline as tolled I-695.

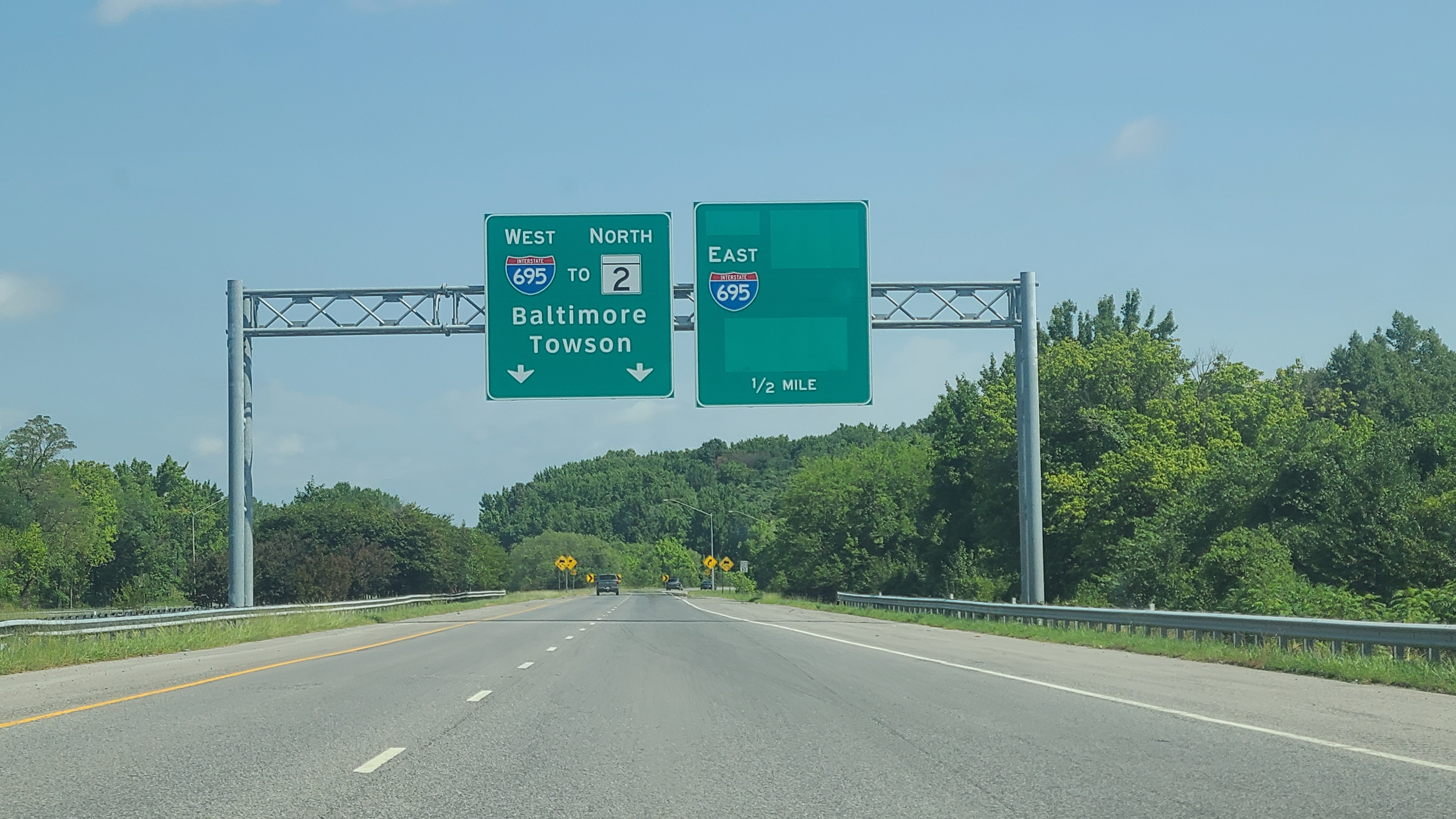
MD 10 approaching I-695, with references to the Key Bridge and eastbound points on the highway sign patched over

I-695 remains closed between the MD 173 and Route 695C interchanges. Most traffic is detoured along I-95 and I-895, which cross Baltimore Harbor in tunnels, both of which prohibit hazardous materials and impose size restrictions. Vehicles that are carrying hazardous loads or are too large for the tunnels are detoured along the western section of I-695, bypassing from the north and west the entire city of Baltimore. Warnings of traffic delays were initially issued to motorists as far away as Virginia.

Cruise ships originally bound for Baltimore docked in other cities. For example, Carnival Legend docked in Norfolk, Virginia, on March 31 and seventy buses took passengers back to Maryland. On April 4, Vision of the Seas was diverted to Norfolk, where its 2,200 passengers boarded buses for Baltimore.

Governor Moore said that 8,000 jobs could be affected by the bridge's collapse and called the disaster a "global crisis". The waterway's closure is causing an estimated daily loss of $15 million. On March 30, the Small Business Administration (SBA) announced that it would make low-interest and long-term loans of up to $2 million to small businesses hurt by the bridge collapse in the Mid-Atlantic states, and the SBA received 500 applications by April 4.

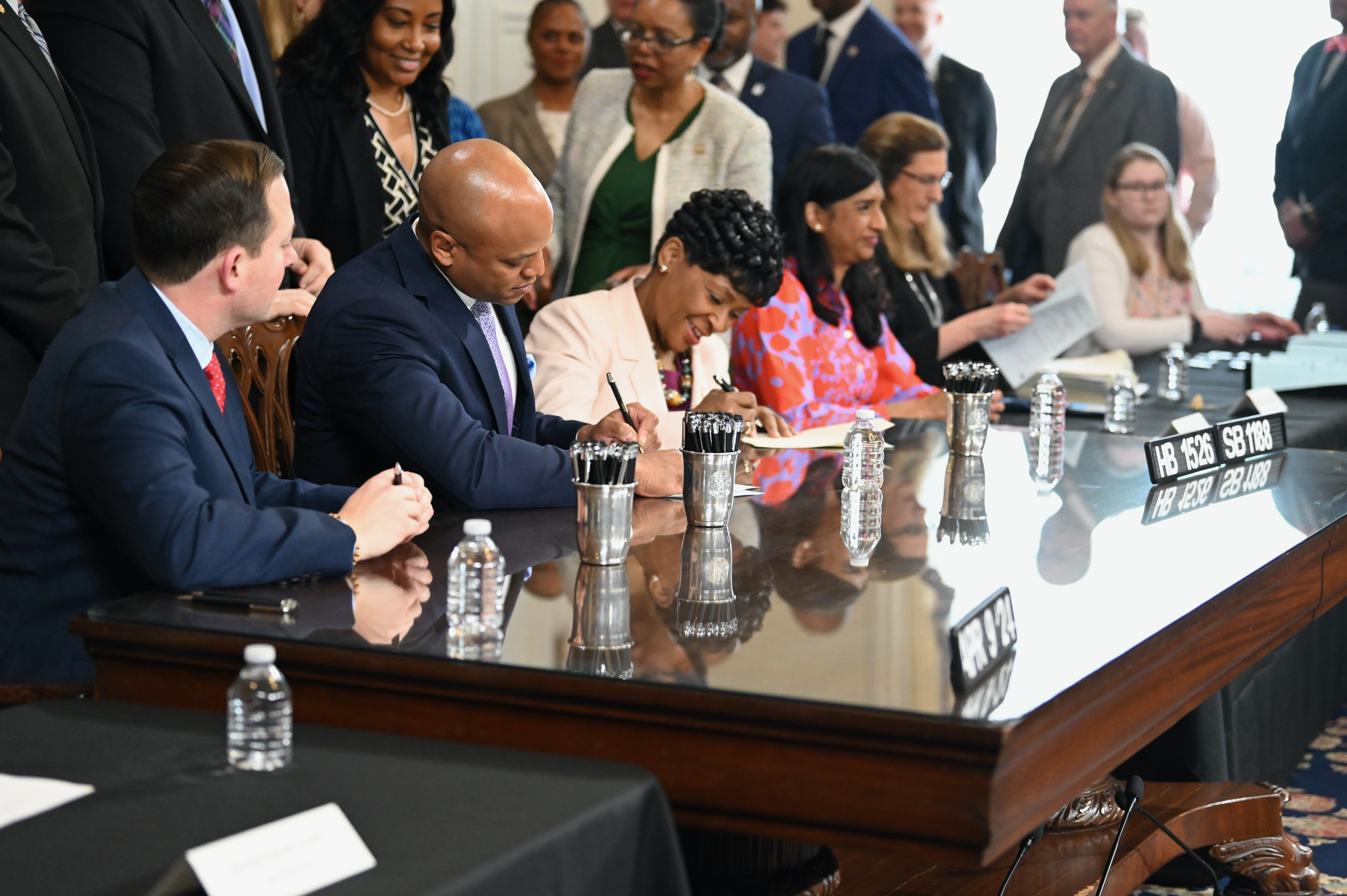
Governor Wes Moore signs the PORT Act into law on April 9, 2024

In the Maryland General Assembly, Bill Ferguson, the president of the Maryland Senate, and state delegate Luke Clippinger introduced emergency legislation to provide money to workers and local businesses affected by the disaster. After discussions with the Moore administration, Ferguson added a provision to establish a state scholarship for the children of the maintenance workers killed in the collapse. On April 8, the General Assembly passed a bill to draw upon the state's rainy day fund to pay port employees who were thrown out of work and are not covered by state unemployment insurance; the governor may also use the fund to help some small businesses avoid layoffs and to encourage companies that shift to other ports to return to a reopened Baltimore port. Governor Moore signed the bill the following day. On April 12, Moore issued an executive order under the law to start a $12.5 million program operated by the Maryland Department of Labor to prevent layoffs by port businesses. On June 14, multiple state agencies announced that they would stop accepting applications for the temporary worker and business assistance programs implemented by the PORT Act on June 28.

Republican state senators Bryan Simonaire and Johnny Ray Salling introduced another bill to allow the governor to declare a year-long state of emergency after damage to critical infrastructure, but it would also have eliminated the authority to seize private property for government use, as now allowed under a state of emergency; Simonaire withdrew the bill after discussions with the Moore administration.

Local roads experienced higher commercial truck traffic, leading to increased wear and tear. Dundalk and Sparrows Point had a 25% increase in potholes following the bridge's collapse.

=== Litigation and insurance ===
Barclays, Morningstar DBRS, Fitch Ratings, and the Insurance Information Institute estimated that the insured losses from the collision could range from $1 billion to $4 billion, surpassing the losses from the 2012 Costa Concordia disaster. Lloyd's of London chairman Bruce Carnegie-Brown said the claims could become the largest marine insurance loss in history. Wrongful death liabilities were estimated to total $350 million to $700 million. Moody's Ratings officials said most claims would likely fall on reinsurance companies, about 80 of which provide some $3 billion in coverage to Dali's insurers. The Maryland state government's insurance for the bridge covered up to $350 million for damage, while the bridge cost $60 million to construct in 1977 (about $319 million in 2025).

==== 2024 ====
On April 1, Grace Ocean Private and Synergy Marine Group filed a joint petition in the Maryland U.S. District Court to limit their liability to about $43.6 million under the Limitation of Liability Act of 1851. Chief Judge James K. Bredar is overseeing the proceedings. Grace Ocean and Synergy Marine are represented by Duane Morris and Blank Rome. An initial court date of June 1st, 2026 has been set for the case. The legal process could last up to a decade and has been described as likely being "one of the most contentious marine insurance cases in recent decades".

On April 17, Grace Ocean Private filed a general average declaration to require cargo owners to cover part of the salvage costs.

On April 15, Baltimore's mayor and city council hired personal injury firm Saltz Mongeluzzi & Bendesky and civil rights firm DiCello Levitt to pursue legal action against Grace Ocean, Synergy Marine, and Maersk.

On April 22, city officials filed papers accusing Grace Ocean Private and Synergy Marine of negligence, claiming the ship was unseaworthy and had an incompetent crew who ignored warnings of an inconsistent power supply before leaving port. If the vessel is proved unseaworthy, through mechanical or human deficiencies, the judgement will void the entities' insurances.

On April 25, a Baltimore-based publishing company sued Grace Ocean and Synergy Marine in a class-action lawsuit that seeks damages for local businesses whose revenues were reduced by the collapse.

On May 2, officials at Willis Towers Watson, the bridge's insurance broker, said that Chubb Limited, the bridge's insurer, was in the process of approving a $350 million insurance claim for the state government.

On September 18, Brawner Builders, the construction company that employed workers who died in the collapse, sued Grace Ocean and Synergy Marine for negligence and sought damages. One day later, Ace American Insurance sued the companies, seeking to recoup $350 million it said it paid to the Maryland Transportation Authority as part of its property insurance policy. Lawsuits alleging negligence were also filed against the companies by the families of six workers who died in the collapse, the family of one worker who survived, and the road work inspector on the bridge at the time of collapse.

Also on September 18, the U.S. Justice Department sued the two companies, alleging negligence, mismanagement, and jury-rigging of Dali's mechanical and electrical systems. The agency sought $100 million, partly to recoup federal expenditures for the emergency response and channel restoration, and partly for punitive damages. On October 24, the department announced that Grace Ocean and Synergy Marine had agreed to pay $101.9 million to settle the government's civil claims.

On September 24, 2,200 members of the International Longshoremen's Association filed a class-action lawsuit against the two companies seeking compensation for lost wages. That same day, the Maryland state government sued the companies, seeking punitive damages and compensation for the total replacement cost for the bridge, expenses for the emergency response, salvage, bridge demolition, unemployment insurance, and business interruption relief, lost revenue from tolls, fees, and taxes, other economic losses, and environmental and infrastructure damage.

==== 2025 ====
Work on the new bridge was scheduled to start January 7, 2025, after the approval by Congress of the December 2024 continuing resolution which included $2 billion in funding. On February 4, 2025, the Maryland Transportation Authority unveiled a preliminary design for a cable-stayed bridge, Maryland's first. It is to have two travel lanes in each direction, with a 1,600-foot (490 m) main span and 600-foot (180 m) supporting towers. Its clearance over the shipping channel will be at least 230 feet (70 m), higher than the old bridge's 185 feet (56 m). The bridge will be longer so the roadway can reach the increased height with an acceptably gradual incline. Demolition of the remaining bridge began in July 2025. The demolition was expected to take nine months.

==== 2026 ====
On June 1, the United States District Court for the District of Maryland scheduled a hearing regarding whether the Limitation of Liability Act of 1851 limits economic damages against the owners and operators of MV Dali. An Order, 840, was granted, on June 1, to stay these proceedings, to a future date.

In June 2026, prosecutors agreed to a deferred prosecution for the vessel's chief engineer, Karthikeyan Deenadayalan, who admitted to conduct that constitutes a criminal violation of the Ports and Waterways Safety Act, regarding an unsafe fuel supply arrangement, which led to the collision. Additional Synergy employees, including Radhakrishnan Karthik Nair, who had instructed Deenadayalan, were charged separately.

=== Crew ===
On May 15, 2024, the BBC reported that the 21 crew members of Indian and Sri Lankan nationality remained below deck on Dali. They had not been permitted to disembark as they did not have the necessary entry visas or shore passes, and the FBI had confiscated their mobile phones. In June, all members of the crew were allowed to disembark. Ten members of the crew were allowed to leave the United States, but eleven higher-ranked crew members were ordered to stay in Baltimore indefinitely as legal proceedings continue.

As of March 2026, eight members of the crew of the Dali were still confined to Baltimore as part of an agreement between the U.S. government and their employer. Some were allowed to visit home for a limited time.

== Response ==
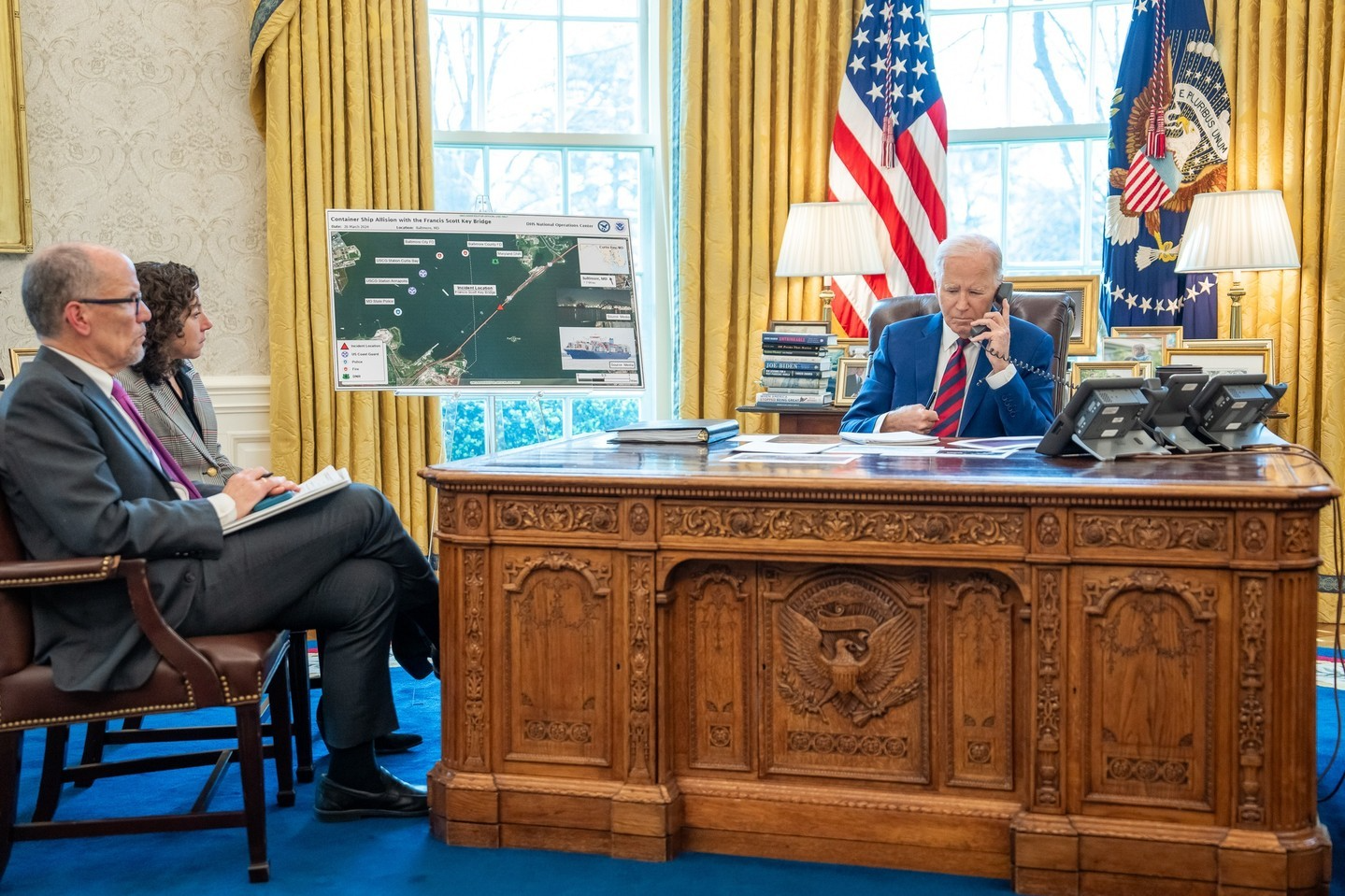
President Biden is briefed on the collapse

External videos
- Remarks by U.S. president Joe Biden on the bridge collapse, March 26, 2024, C-SPAN

President Joe Biden was briefed on the disaster within hours of the collision. U.S. Secretary of Transportation Pete Buttigieg contacted Maryland governor Wes Moore and Baltimore mayor Brandon Scott to offer his department's support. Moore addressed the families of the victims in Spanish, saying, "Estamos contigo, ahora y siempre [we are with you, now and always]". Maryland Center for History and Culture vice president David Belew said, "Our harbor, port and many families are fundamentally changed" by the disaster. On March 27, Moore and Biden thanked Dali's crew for transmitting the mayday call warning of the ship's power failure and the impending collision. On March 28, three officers of the MDTA were recognized at the opening game of the Baltimore Orioles for their role in stopping traffic before the bridge collapsed.

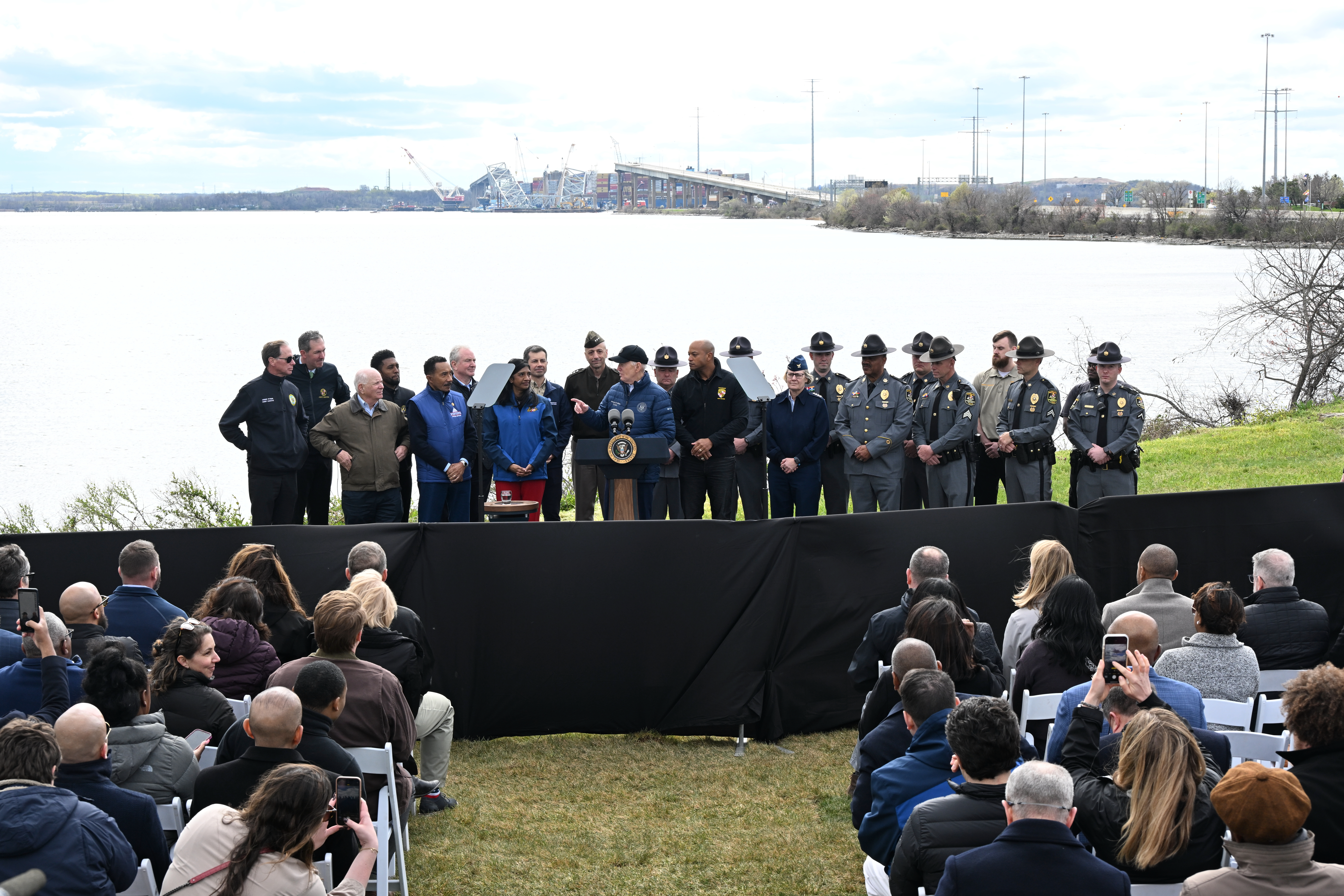
President Biden joins Governor Moore and local officials to speak near the bridge

Biden visited the site on April 5; he surveyed the wreckage from Marine One and was later briefed by officials from the local government, the Coast Guard and USACE. He pledged the support of the federal government for a bridge replacement and the recovery effort "every step of the way", adding that "the nation has your back". He also met with families of the victims.

The Mexican embassy in the U.S. provided consular assistance to the families, setting up a dedicated phone line for affected Mexican nationals. Mexican president Andrés Manuel López Obrador said the disaster highlighted the contribution of migrants to the US economy and "demonstrates that migrants go out and do risky jobs at midnight". Rafael Laveaga Rendón, head of the consular section, travelled to Baltimore to help the workers' families. It has been confirmed that one of the rescued was from Michoacán, while the two Mexican nationals whose bodies were recovered were from Michoacán and Veracruz.

On April 11, Moore announced that the state government had launched a website with information about federal, state, and local government programs related to the bridge collapse. That month, members of the Baltimore County Latino community created a memorial for the construction workers at the south end of the bridge.

=== Racism and conspiracy theories ===
Soon after the collision, racist memes appeared on alt-right social media platforms targeting Brandon Scott and Wes Moore (who are African-American), as well as Baltimorean public workers (Baltimore is majority Black) and the mostly Indian crew of the MV Dali. Many users of the platforms, as well as far-right media outlet The Blaze, blamed DEI for the incident, suggesting that it was the fault of non-White members of the crew or Baltimore government officials.

There is no evidence that terrorists or foreign governments were involved, according to Moore and an FBI officer in charge of the station in Baltimore. Still, Andrew Tate, Jackson Hinkle, and others suggested without evidence that the collision was caused by Israel, Ukraine, or Russia.

=== Salvage ===
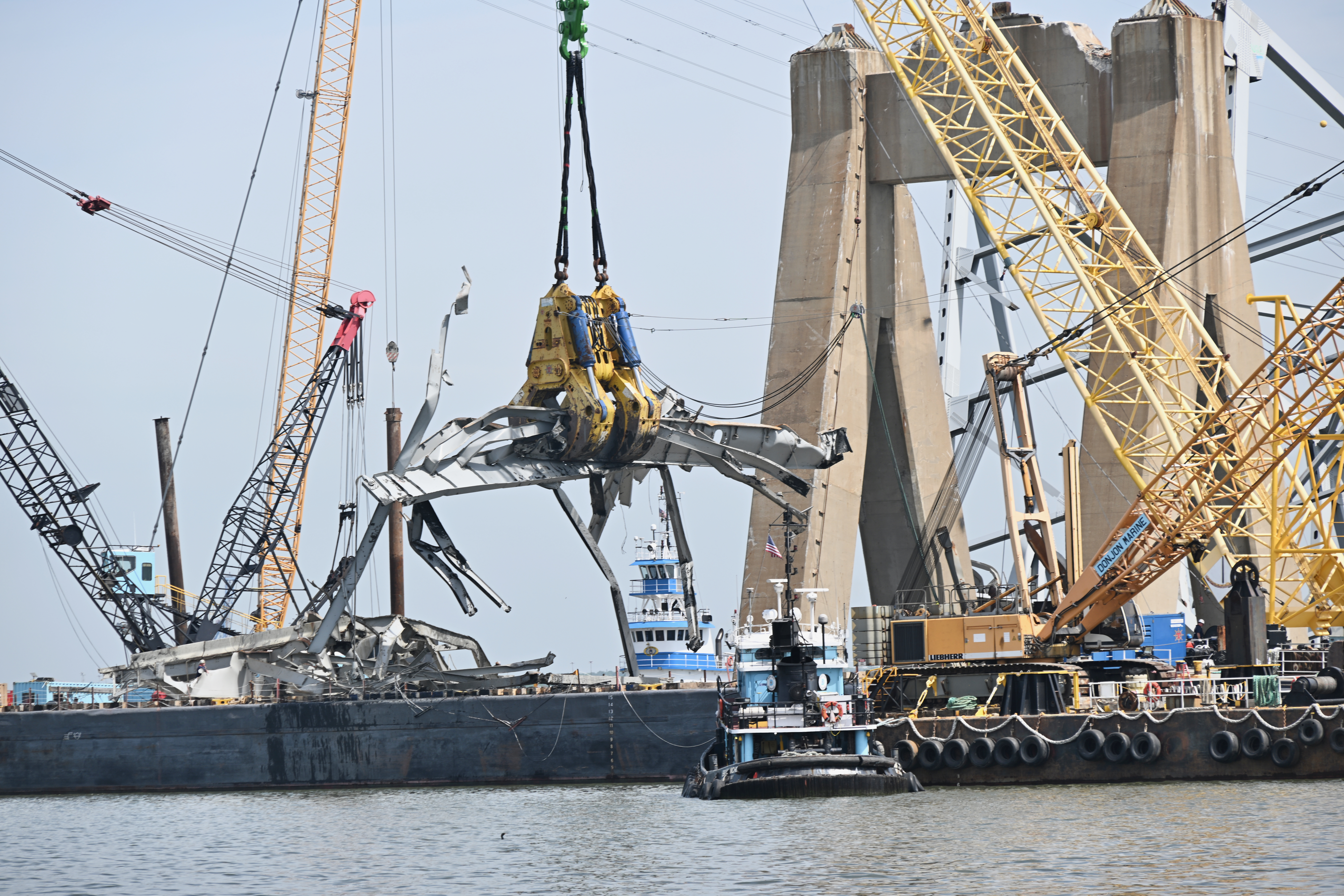
Debris being removed on April 30

The U.S. Army Corps of Engineers (USACE) took the lead in removing the fallen portions of the bridge. The U.S. Navy hired heavy-lift cranes to remove submerged wreckage, including the Weeks 533 and the Donjon Marine Co.'s Chesapeake 1000. The latter, dubbed the "largest crane ship on the East Coast", can lift 1,000 short tons (890 long tons; 910 t). The designated salvor is Resolve Marine. Thirty-two USACE personnel and 38 Navy contractors were deployed to the scene. More than 1,100 engineering specialists were to join them. Seven floating cranes, ten tugboats, nine barges, eight salvage vessels, and five Coast Guard boats were deployed around the bridge.

On March 30, engineers began removing the first piece of the bridge from the river. On April 1, the Coast Guard opened a temporary passage for commercial work vessels involved in recovery and clearing efforts, with a controlling depth of 11 feet (3.4 m), a horizontal clearance of 264 feet (80 m) and a vertical clearance of 96 feet (29 m), and was approving ships' passage case by case. The next day, the first work vessel used the alternate channel: a tugboat pushing a fuel barge to Dover Air Force Base in Delaware. A second channel was opened the next day, as work continued on a third channel. On April 7, salvage crews began to remove containers from Dali. By April 16, the salvage operation had removed more than 1,000 tons of steel from the waterway, and by April 19, 120 of the 140 containers necessary to build a staging area to remove steel and concrete fallen onto the ship's deck.

By April 26, some 3,000 of a total of about 50,000 tons of wreckage had been pulled from the river, and 171 commercial vessels had passed through the four alternate channels. The salvage and recovery flotilla had grown to 36 barges, 27 tugboats, 22 floating cranes, 10 excavators, 1 dredger, 1 skimmer, and 3 Coast Guard cutters. The workforce included more than 250 uniformed and civilian workers from 53 agencies from across the U.S. plus 553 contractors handling dive, crane and vessel operations. By April 30, another 300 tons of wreckage had removed. MPA officials said salvors were expected to disentangle and remove Dali by May 10.

On May 13, after a delay for weather, explosives were detonated to remove the part of the bridge span that was resting on Dali's bow. The hull had not been breached below the waterline, enabling the ship to stay afloat and easing the salvage operation. On May 20, the ship was disentangled from wreckage materials, pulled from the mud shoal upon which it had been partly grounded, and tugged away from the bridge.

=== Channel restoration ===
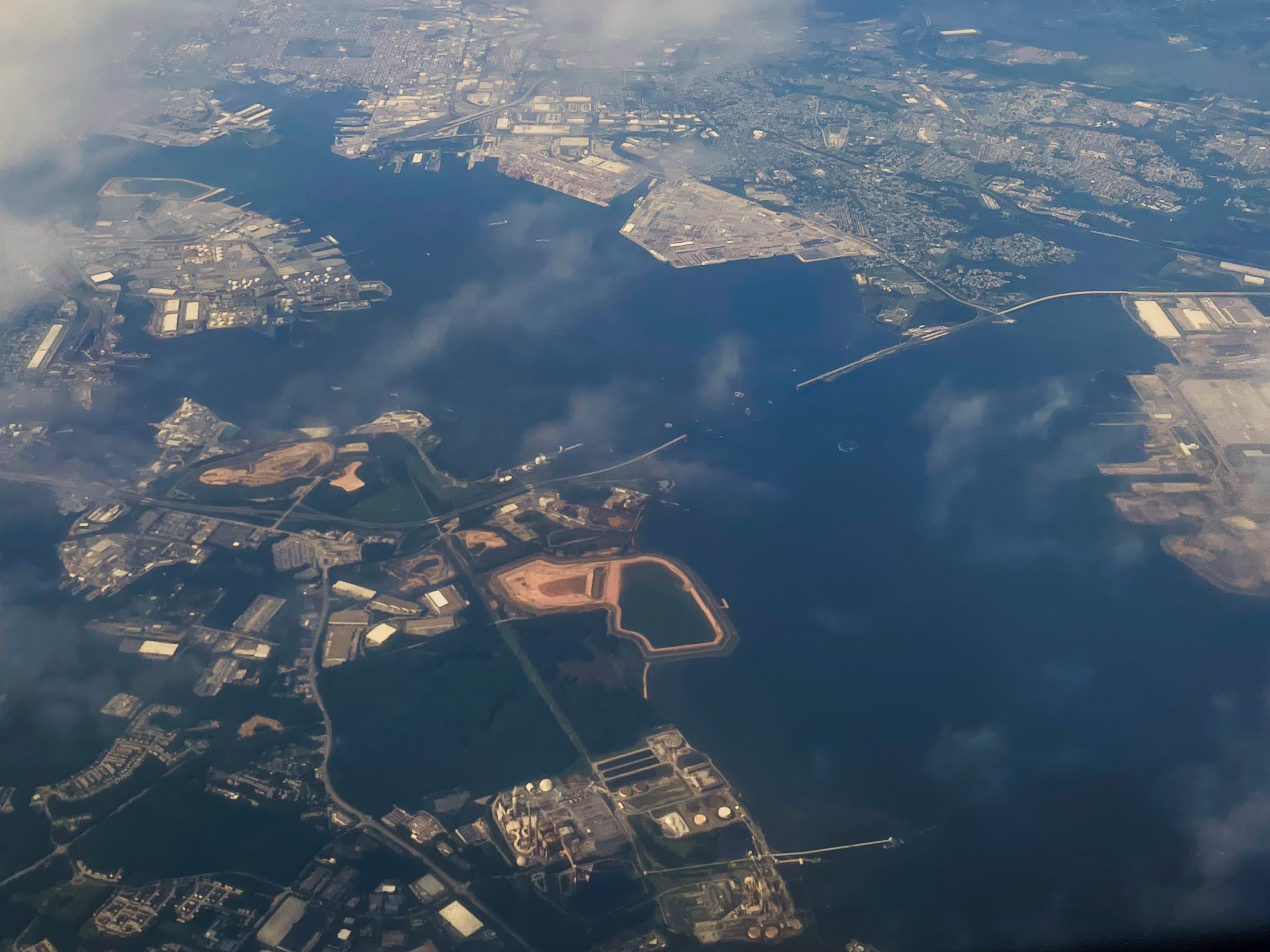
August 2024 view showing the open channel and missing bridge segment

One week after the collapse, USACE officials said clearing the Fort McHenry Channel to reopen the port would probably take weeks rather than months. They announced a tentative schedule to a limited-access one-way channel for barges and roll-on/roll-off ships by the end of April and the entire channel by the end of May. Salvage experts also said the reopening could happen as early as May.

By April 20, three temporary channels had been opened, enabling roughly 15% of pre-collapse shipping to pass. The channels were named for local landmarks; from north to south, they are Sollers Point, Fort Carroll, and Hawkins Point Shoal.

On April 25, salvage crews opened a fourth temporary channel—at 35 feet (11 m), the deepest yet—about a week ahead of schedule. An MPA spokesman said the fourth channel could serve about half of the ships that use the port, though the Coast Guard would determine just which vessels may pass. Four of the eleven ships that had been trapped in port used the fourth channel to depart by April 29, when the channel was closed again to allow salvage crews to resume removing bridge wreckage.

On May 20, Dali was disentangled from the bridge wreckage and removed from the vicinity of the bridge. Four days later, officials said the channel would be fully restored to its original 700 ft (200 m) wide x 50 ft (15 m) deep clearance by June 10.

On June 10, the channel reopened, 11 weeks after the bridge's collapse.

=== Bridge safety regulation ===
On March 27, Buttigieg said that the U.S. Department of Transportation would apply the findings of the NTSB investigation of the bridge collapse to "regulation, inspection, design or funding of bridges in the future". He noted that the bridge was not designed to withstand the impact of a vessel of Dali's weight (about 95,000 tonnes empty). In 2022, the FHWA finalized new data specifications for state inspectors to use for bridge pier protections that are scheduled to take effect in 2026.

According to a Wall Street Journal analysis of the National Bridge Inventory, there are eight U.S. bridges that are fracture critical (a condition flagged by the NTSB in its investigation) and have similar vertical clearance as the Francis Scott Key Bridge: the Tacoma Narrows Bridge, the Lewis and Clark Bridge over the Columbia River, the St. Johns Bridge, the San Francisco–Oakland Bay Bridge, the Golden Gate Bridge, the George Washington Bridge, the Verrazzano–Narrows Bridge, and the Chesapeake Bay Bridge. The preliminary NTSB report stated that the agency was working with the Maryland Transportation Authority to study short-term and long-term modifications to the pier protection system for the Chesapeake Bay Bridge.

When reporters asked about a proposal to require tugboats to pilot vessels around critical maritime infrastructure, officials with the Coast Guard, the Department of Transportation, the Cybersecurity and Infrastructure Security Agency, and the U.S. Department of Homeland Security Joint Information Center either referred the inquiries to different agencies or said their agencies lacked jurisdiction to create such a regulation. By April 11, the Maryland Port Administration had begun consulting tugboat operators about potential modifications to protocol, which would depend upon recommendations from the NTSB and the Coast Guard.

=== Bridge replacement ===
Hours after the collapse, President Biden said that the federal government would pay for the entire cost of reconstructing the bridge. In June 2024, the Maryland Department of Transportation accepted bids to design and build a replacement bridge by autumn 2028 at an estimated cost of $1.7 billion to $1.9 billion. The Maryland Transportation Authority, however, announced in November 2025 that their cost estimates had been revised upward, to between $4.3 billion and $5.2 billion.

== See also ==
- List of bridge failures
- Severn Railway Bridge accident – a similar incident in the UK in 1960
- Tasman Bridge disaster – a similar incident in Australia in 1975
- Almö Bridge collapse – a similar incident in Sweden in 1980
- MV Summit Venture – a similar incident in Florida in 1980
