= MV Dali =

Singapore-registered container ship

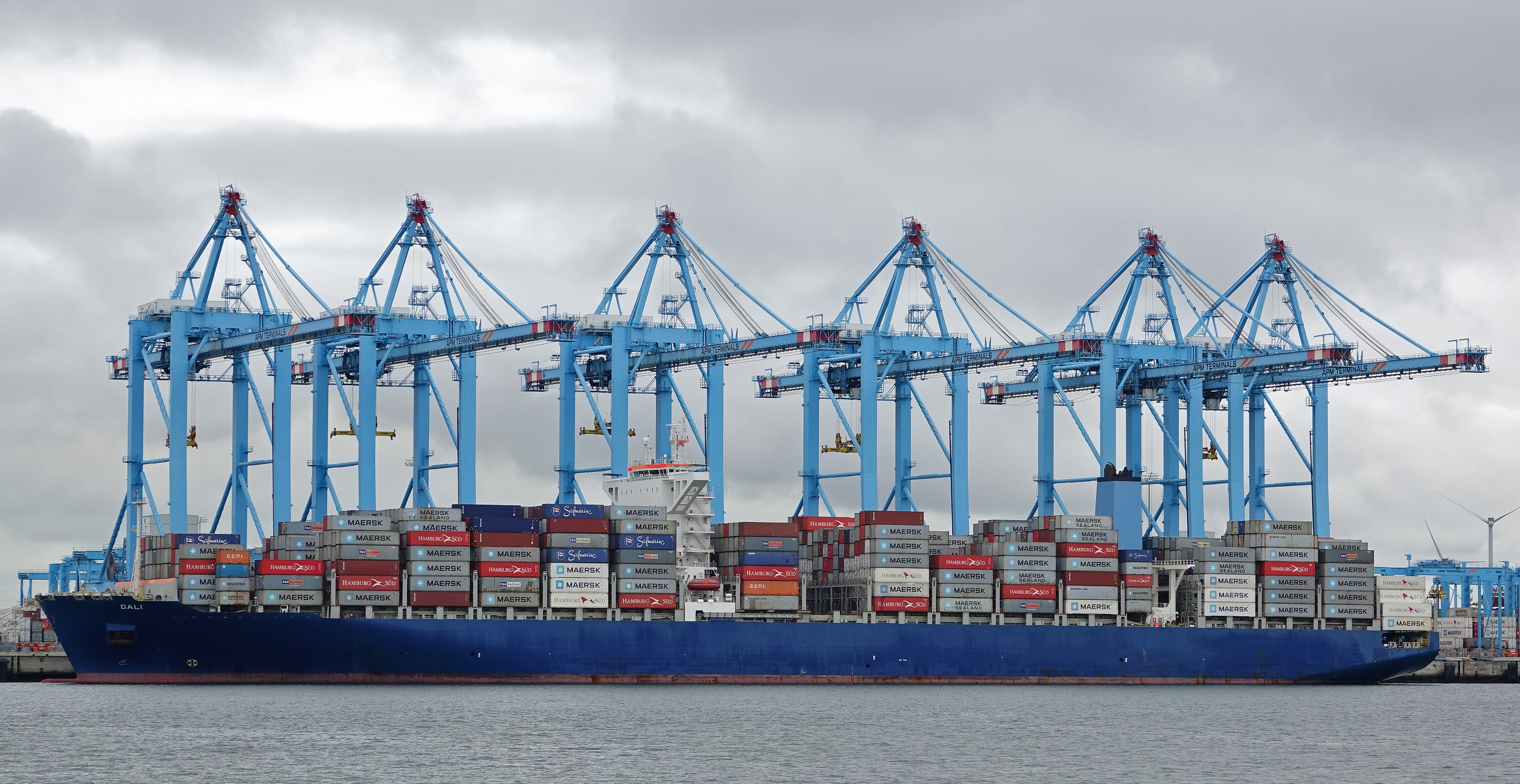
- Dali in the Port of Rotterdam in 2018

History
- Name: Dali
- Namesake: Salvador Dalí
- Owner: Stellar Marine LLC (2015–2016); Grace Ocean Pte. Ltd. (2016–present)
- Operator: Maersk (charterer); Oceanbulk Container Management (2015–2016); Synergy Marine Pte. Ltd. (2016–present)
- Port of registry: Majuro, Marshall Islands (2015–2016); Singapore (2016–present)
- Ordered: 14 May 2013
- Builder: Hyundai Heavy Industries (Ulsan, South Korea)
- Yard number: 2678
- Laid down: 10 October 2014
- Launched: 27 December 2014
- Christened: 5 January 2015
- Completed: 5 March 2015
- Identification: IMO number: 9697428; MMSI number: 563004200 (2016–present); Call sign: 9V5283 (2016–present)
- Status: Active

General characteristics
- Class & type: Neopanamax container ship
- Tonnage: 95,128 GT; 52,150 NT; 116,851 DWT
- Displacement: 148,984 t (146,631 long tons)
- Length: 299.92 m (984 ft)
- Beam: 48.2 m (158 ft 2 in)
- Draught: 15.03 m (49 ft 4 in)
- Depth: 24.8 m (81 ft 4 in)
- Installed power: MAN-B&W 9S90ME-C9.2; 41,480 kW (55,630 hp)
- Propulsion: Single shaft; fixed pitch propeller
- Speed: 22 knots (41 km/h; 25 mph)
- Capacity: 9,971 TEU

MV Dali is a Neopanamax container ship built by Hyundai Heavy Industries. On 26 March 2024, she caused the collapse of the Francis Scott Key Bridge in Baltimore when she lost power and collided with one of its supports.

Contracted in 2013, her hull was laid down in October 2014, launched in December, and she was named after Spanish painter Salvador Dalí in January 2015. In March, she was delivered to Stellar Marine, a subsidiary of the Greek shipowner Oceanbulk Maritime. In July 2016, she collided with the berth at the container terminal of the Port of Antwerp, damaging the ship and the berth.

Dali was sold by Stellar Marine to Grace Ocean, a Singaporean company, in October 2016; she was placed under the management of Synergy Marine and reflagged as Singaporean. A faulty fuel pressure gauge was detected at the port of San Antonio, Chile, in June 2023; the gauge was replaced and no faults were detected at a further check three months later. On 26 March 2024, shortly after leaving the Port of Baltimore with a crew of 22 and two Maryland pilots en route to Colombo, Sri Lanka, the ship lost power and struck a support pillar of the Francis Scott Key Bridge, causing its collapse. Traffic had been stopped on the bridge in response to a mayday call, but six construction workers were killed.

== Description ==
Dali is a Neopanamax container ship with a length of 299.92 metres (984 ft), beam of 48.2 metres (158 ft 2 in), moulded depth of 24.8 metres (81 ft 4 in), and summer draft of 15.03 metres (49 ft 4 in). Her gross and net tonnages are 91,128 and 52,150, respectively, and her deadweight tonnage is 116,851 tonnes. Her container capacity is 9,971 twenty-foot equivalent units (TEU).

Dali is propelled by a single low-speed two-stroke crosshead diesel engine coupled to a fixed-pitch propeller. Her main engine, a 9-cylinder MAN-B&W 9S90ME-C9.2 unit manufactured by Hyundai Heavy Industries under license, is rated 41,480 kW (55,630 hp) at 82.5 rpm. Her service speed is 22 knots (41 km/h; 25 mph). For manoeuvring, Dali has a single 3,000 kW (4,000 hp) bow thruster. Electricity is generated onboard by two 3,840 kW (5,150 hp) and two 4,400 kW (5,900 hp) auxiliary diesel generators.

== Construction ==
On 14 May 2013, Hyundai Heavy Industries was contracted to build two container ships based on the "Hyundai 9000 wide beam" design that was modified by moving the wheelhouse from three-quarters aft to a more forward position to increase the container capacity from 9,034 to 9,962 TEU. A further two similar ships were ordered for CMA CGM and four for Maersk later in 2013.

The construction began in Ulsan, South Korea, in July 2014 and the hull with the yard number 2678 was laid down on 10 October 2014 and launched on 27 December of the same year. On 5 January 2015, Dali and her sister ship Cezanne were named for painters Salvador Dalí and Paul Cézanne.

== Service ==
Dali was delivered to Stellar Marine LLC, a subsidiary of the Greek shipowner Oceanbulk Maritime SA, on 5 March 2015 and registered in Majuro, Marshall Islands. In October 2016, she was sold to Grace Ocean Pte. Ltd. and placed under the management of Synergy Marine Pte. Ltd., both based in Singapore where the ship was also reflagged. The ship has been chartered to the Danish shipping and logistics company Maersk since it was delivered in 2015.

On 11 July 2016, Dali collided with the berth at the container terminal in the Port of Antwerp, Belgium, causing significant damage to her stern and transom. The berth was also damaged and closed for cargo handling operations. No injuries or water pollution were reported.

While in the port of San Antonio, Chile, in June 2023, port state control inspection revealed a single deficiency related to "gauges, thermometers etc." in the ship's machinery, subsequently clarified as a monitor gauge for fuel pressure which was rectified prior to departure. The ship was not detained, and at the follow-up inspection in the United States, three months later, no problems were identified.

== Francis Scott Key Bridge collapse ==
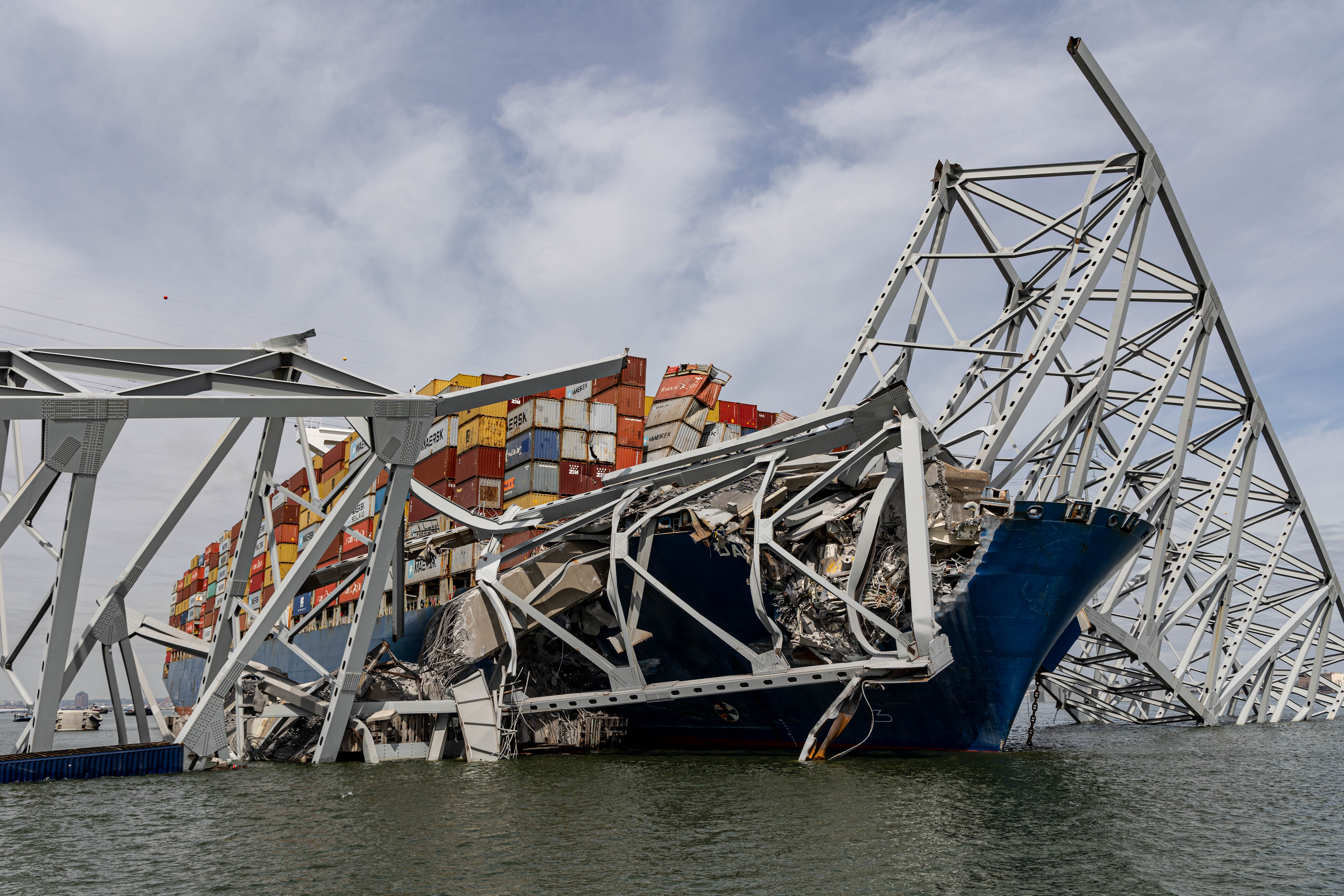
Dali with bridge wreckage across her bow

Dali's size, though considered large, is less than that of the largest container ship.

On 26 March 2024, Dali departed the Port of Baltimore in the United States, carrying a total load of nearly 4,700 containers and bound for Colombo, Sri Lanka, while under charter to Maersk, with a crew of twenty-two and two pilots. Shortly after leaving the port, the ship lost power twice, but was able to broadcast a mayday call in between. Soon afterwards, she collided with a support pillar of the Francis Scott Key Bridge, causing a major part of the bridge to collapse, with one span falling onto the ship's forecastle. None of the 24 on board was seriously injured. All moving traffic had left the bridge, but six construction workers died. The National Transportation Safety Board conducted the investigation and interviewed the crew. It released its findings on 18 November 2025, tracing the ship's two power outages to an improperly labeled signal wire 1 for terminal block 381 in the electrical control room, which came loose; since the defect could have been found by off-the-shelf thermography technology right after installation, the NTSB found Hyundai's subcontractor WAGO Company at fault.

Grace Ocean Private and Synergy Marine Group filed a joint petition on 1 April 2024 in the Maryland U.S. District Court to limit their liability to about $43.6 million under the Limitation of Liability Act of 1851. Chief judge James K. Bredar is overseeing the proceedings. On 17 April, Grace Ocean Private filed a general average declaration to require cargo owners to cover part of the salvage costs.

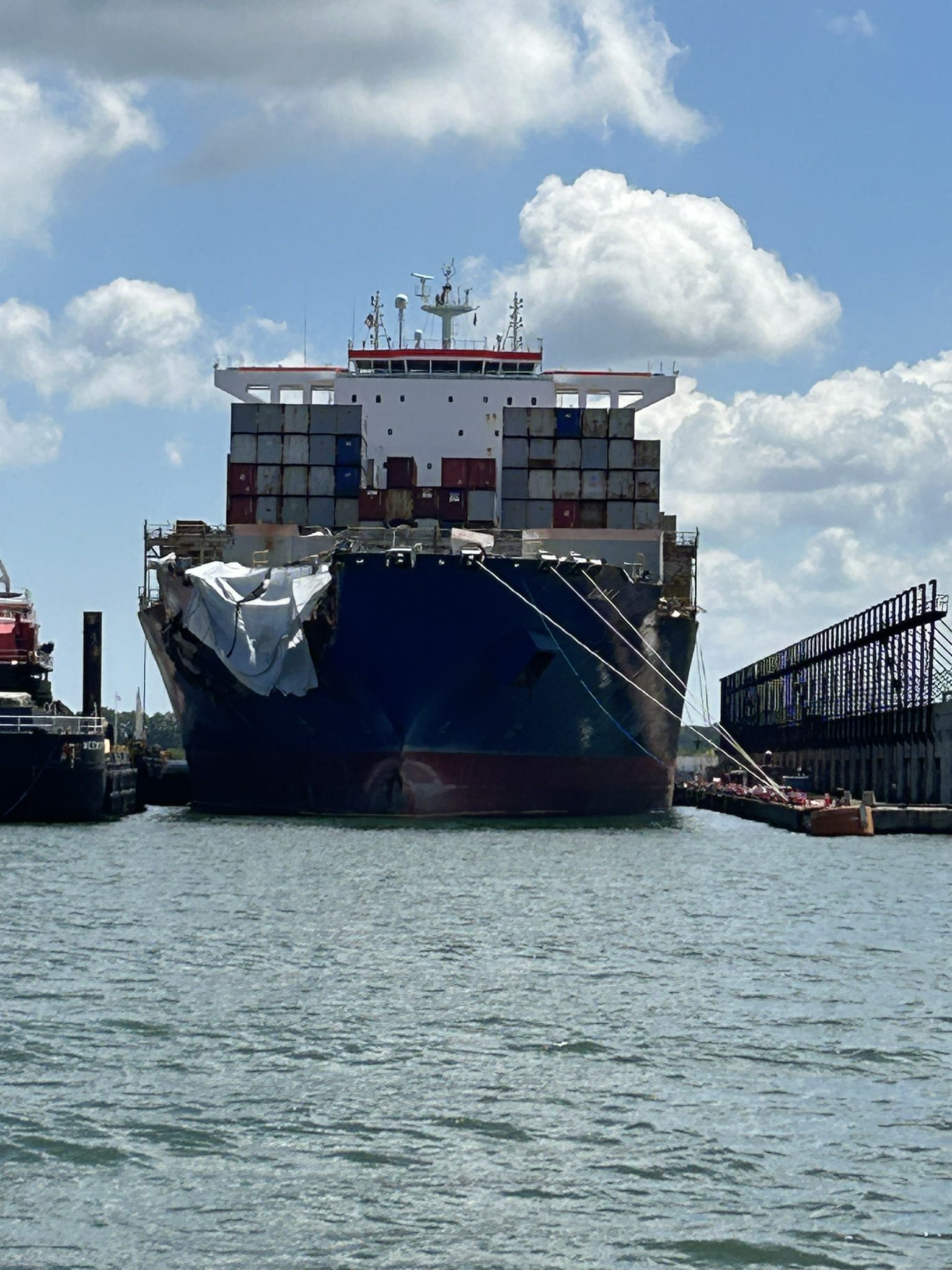
Dali undergoing repairs at the Norfolk International Terminals in Norfolk, Virginia

On 23 April, the Mayor and City Council of Baltimore filed papers, in the Northern District of Maryland, seeking a jury trial within the district, to obtain compensation from Grace Ocean Private Limited of Singapore (owners), and Synergy Marine PE Ltd of Singapore (managers), for the resultant financial losses. The plaintiffs alleged that the defendants provided an incompetent, inattentive, improperly trained, improperly supervised crew, on an improperly maintained and unseaworthy vessel, resulting in the bridge collapse, harming the city.

The collapsed parts of the bridge were separated from the ship on 13 May by explosives. A week later the authorities removed Dali using tugboats which berthed the ship at the Seagirt Marine Terminal for inspection, assessment, and more debris removal. Dali arrived in Hampton Roads on 25 June 2024, to unload its cargo at Virginia International Gateway and undergo repairs.

Dali left Norfolk for China in September 2024. On 13 November, she arrived at Fujian Huadong Shipyard, where structural damage to the ship's bow and deck was repaired, and work done on the vessel's machinery, anchors, thrusters, electrical and hydraulic systems and number-one cargo hold. It was unclear whether the work fixed problems that contributed to the collision. Post-repair sea trials began on 12 January 2025. Dali was returned to service on 21 January under the management of Synergy Marine, and was assigned to Maersk's AC3 route between Asia and Central America.

In June 2026, prosecutors agreed to a deferred prosecution for the vessel's chief engineer, Karthikeyan Deenadayalan, who admitted to conduct that constitutes a criminal violation of the Ports and Waterways Safety Act, regarding an unsafe fuel supply arrangement, which led to the collision. Additional Synergy employees, including Radhakrishnan Karthik Nair, who had instructed Deenadayalan, were charged separately.

== See also ==
- Lake Illawarra, the bulk carrier that collided with the Tasman Bridge in 1975
- Marine Floridian, the tanker that collided with the Benjamin Harrison Memorial Bridge in 1977
- Summit Venture, the bulk carrier that collided with the Sunshine Skyway Bridge in 1980
