= Limitation of Liability Act of 1851 =

United States law passed in 1851

Limitation of Liability Act
- Long title: An act to limit the Liability of Ship-Owners, and for other Purposes.
- Enacted by: the 31st United States Congress
- Effective: March 3, 1851

Citations
- Statutes at Large: 9 Stat. 635 (Ch.43)

In United States maritime law, the Limitation of Liability Act of 1851 states that the owner of a vessel may limit damage claims to the value of the vessel at the end of the voyage plus "pending freight", as long as the owner can prove it lacked knowledge of the problem beforehand. This Act was the subject of a 2001 United States Supreme Court case in Lewis v. Lewis & Clark Marine, Inc.

== History ==
The Act was passed by Congress on March 3, 1851 to protect the maritime shipping industry; at the time, shipowners were subject to loss from events beyond their control such as storms and pirates, so the Act was designed to limit the shipowners' liability to the value of the vessel. Without it, American shipping was "at a competitive disadvantage" compared to other maritime countries where similar limitations applied.

Section 3 of the 1851 Act states "the liability of the owner or owners of any ship or vessel ... shall in no case exceed the amount or value of the interest of such owner or owners respectively, in such ship or vessel, and her freight then pending". The 1851 Act was later codified as Rev. Stat. §4282–4289, with Section 3 forming Rev. Stat. §4283.

The original bill was subsequently amended many times:

- 1871, which added Rev. Stat. §4281
- 1875, which modified Rev. Stat. §4289 with an editorial correction
- 1877, which modified Rev. Stat. §4284 with an editorial correction
- 1884, the Shipping Act of 1884, which limited an individual owner's liability to the owner's share of debts and liabilities, later codified as 46 U.S.C. Appendix Ch.8 §§189
- 1886, which modified Rev. Stat. §4289 to clarify which vessels are covered
- 1893, the Harter Act, which was later codified as 46 U.S.C. Appendix Ch.8 §§190–196
- 1935, which modified Rev. Stat. §4283 and added §4283A
- 1936, which modified Rev. Stat. §4283, §4285, and §4289; and added §4283B
- 1940, which repealed 46 U.S.C. Appendix Ch.8 §§175
- 1984, which modified Rev. Stat. §4283
- 1992, which modified Rev. Stat. §4283B
- 1993, which modified Rev. Stat. §4283B
- 1996, which modified Rev. Stat. §4283 and §4283B
- 2010, which moved the code to 46 U.S.C. § 30501

The 1936 amendment clarified whether the act applied to foreign shipowners; previously, the 1851 Act stated the owner of "any ship or vessel" could limit their liability, whether domestic or foreign, which was affirmed by an 1876 court decision. The 1936 amendment made explicit the applicability to foreign shipowners, stating "The liability of the owner of any vessel, whether American or foreign ... shall not, except in the cases provided for ... exceed the amount or value of the interest of such owner in such vessel, and her freight then pending".

Rev. Stat. §4281–89 eventually were moved to 46 U.S.C. App. Ch. 8, and then to 46 U.S.C. § 30501 in 2010.

== Invocation ==
The statute has been invoked to limit the liability of certain parties in the sinking of RMS Titanic (1912), the Deepwater Horizon oil spill (2010), and the sinking of MV Conception (2019). In the case of RMS Titanic, the district court judge initially ruled that British limitation of liability law would apply, but that decision was reversed by the United States Supreme Court in 1914.

The statute was again invoked on April 1, 2024, when MV Dali owner Grace Ocean Private and crew manager Synergy Marine Group filed a joint petition in the Maryland U.S. District Court to limit their liability to about $43.6 million under the Act, following the Francis Scott Key Bridge collapse.

=== Unsuccessful attempts to amend the act ===
An attempt to create The Deepwater Horizon Survivors' Fairness Act was put before the Senate in 2012, and sought to amend the Limitation of Liability Act to make an exception for personal injuries and wrongful death claims related to the explosion and destruction of the Deepwater Horizon oil drilling platform. It was referred to the Committee on Commerce, Science, and Transportation. The Congressional Budget Office provided a cost estimate. The bill died in committee.

Rejected bills were introduced simultaneously in the House and Senate in September 2021 to amend the Limitation of Liability Act. As originally written, the bills would take effect retroactively to September 2, 2019 and apply to the sinking of MV Conception. The bills died in committee.
