= Lewis v. Lewis & Clark Marine, Inc. =

- Supreme Court of the United States

Argued November 29, 2000 Decided February 21, 2001
- Full case name: James F. Lewis v. Lewis & Clark Marine Incorporated
- Citations: 531 U.S. 438 (more) 121 S. Ct. 993; 148 L. Ed. 2d 931

Case history
- Prior: On Writ of Certiorari to the United States Court of Appeals for the Eighth Circuit

Holding
- A District Court did not abuse discretion when it dissolved an injunction under the LLA, which prevented a seaman from suing a vessel owner in state court.

Court membership
- Chief Justice William Rehnquist Associate Justices John P. Stevens · Sandra Day O'Connor; Antonin Scalia · Anthony Kennedy; David Souter · Clarence Thomas; Ruth Bader Ginsburg · Stephen Breyer

Case opinion
- Majority: O'Connor, joined by unanimous

Laws applied
- Limitation of Liability Act

Lewis v. Lewis & Clark Marine, Inc., 531 U.S. 438 (2001), was a decision by the Supreme Court of the United States involving an injunction under the Limitation of Liability Act and whether a district court acted properly in dissolving it.

== Background ==
In 1998, James F. Lewis, a deckhand aboard a ship owned by Lewis & Clark Marine, Inc., claimed that he was injured when he tripped over a wire on the boat. Lewis then sued Lewis & Clark in Illinois County Court, for personal injuries claiming negligence under the Jones Act. Lewis & Clark had already filed a complaint for exoneration from, or limitation of, liability in the District Court under the Limitation of Liability Act (Act). Subsequently, the court approved a surety bond of $450,000, representing Lewis & Clark's interest in the vessel, ordered that any claim related to the incident be filed with the court within a specified period, and enjoined the filing or prosecution of any suits related to the incident. The injunction prevented Lewis from litigating his personal injury claims in state court and he moved to dissolve it. Ultimately, the court dissolved the injunction. The Eight Circuit Court of Appeals reversed.

== Opinion of the Court ==
Justice Sandra Day O'Connor wrote the unanimous opinion of the Court which reversed the Eighth Circuit's decision. The Court held that because state courts may adjudicate claims like Lewis' against vessel owners so long as the owner's right to seek limitation of liability is protected, the Court of Appeals erred in reversing the District Court's decision to dissolve the injunction. Writing for the Court, Justice O'Connor rejected the respondent's proposal to make "run of the mill personal injury actions involving vessels a matter of exclusive federal jurisdiction except where the claimant happens to seek a jury trial."

== See also ==
- Merchant Marine Act of 1920 (the "Jones Act")
- Personal injury
