= 2003 Staten Island Ferry crash =

Fatal accident in New York City

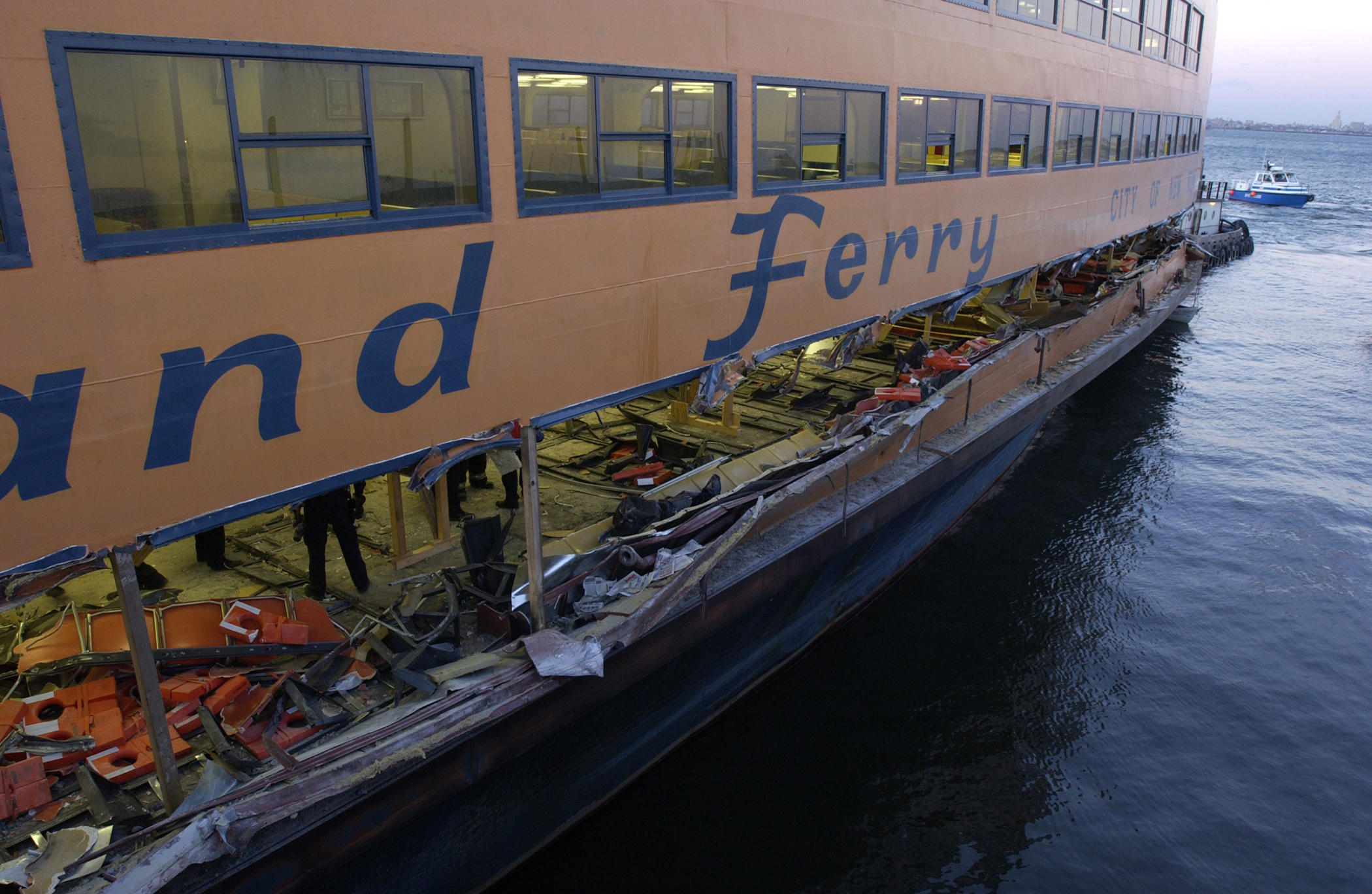
- Damage to the ferry after the crash

Details
- Date: October 15, 2003; 3:21 p.m. (EDT)
- Location: St. George Ferry Terminal; St. George, Staten Island; 5.34 mi (8.59 km) from New York City
- Coordinates: 40.6439312°N 74.0726063°W
- Country: United States
- Line: Staten Island Ferry
- Operator: New York City Department of Transportation
- Service: Passenger
- Cause: Pilot impairment

Statistics
- Passengers: ~1,500 passengers, 15 crew
- Deaths: 11
- Injured: 70

On October 15, 2003, at 3:21 p.m. EDT, the Staten Island Ferry vessel Andrew J. Barberi crashed full-speed into a concrete maintenance pier at the St. George Terminal in Upper New York Bay. Eleven people were killed and 70 injured, some critically. Pilot Richard J. Smith and New York City ferry director Patrick Ryan pleaded guilty and were jailed for seaman's manslaughter. Smith was piloting under impairment from painkillers, and Ryan failed to enforce the city rule requiring two pilots in the wheelhouse during docking.

== Crash ==
The 310-foot (94 m) ferry was at the end of its 5-mile (8 km), 25-minute trip from South Ferry, Manhattan to St. George, Staten Island. On board were approximately 1,500 passengers, one-quarter of the maximum capacity of 6,000. Winds were heavy that afternoon, with gusts of more than 40 mph (64 km/h). The water in New York Harbor was described as "very choppy".

Instead of docking, the ferry angled away from its berth and collided with a concrete maintenance pier. The pier ripped into the ferry's starboard side and tore into the boat's main deck where many passengers were crowding forward to disembark. The collision left a number of victims trapped in a pile of metal, glass, and splintered wood, while other passengers jumped overboard. The ferry's hull on the Staten Island end sustained significant damage, including the destruction of bulkheads, support frames and support columns along the starboard side.

== Fatalities and injuries ==
Ten people were killed, plus an eleventh person who died two months after the crash from injuries sustained during the collision, and 70 others were injured in the crash, including several who lost limbs. All the fatalities and most of the injuries were to passengers on the main deck; some passengers on the upper decks were injured during the crowd's panic, and many were treated for shock. The deaths included a survivor of the September 11 attacks and a woman who was placed in a drug-induced coma for two months after the crash. Paul Esposito, a 24-year-old waiter, had both legs severed below the knee. His life was saved by Kerry Griffiths, a sightseeing 34-year-old pediatric nurse from England, who applied tourniquets.

== Aftermath ==
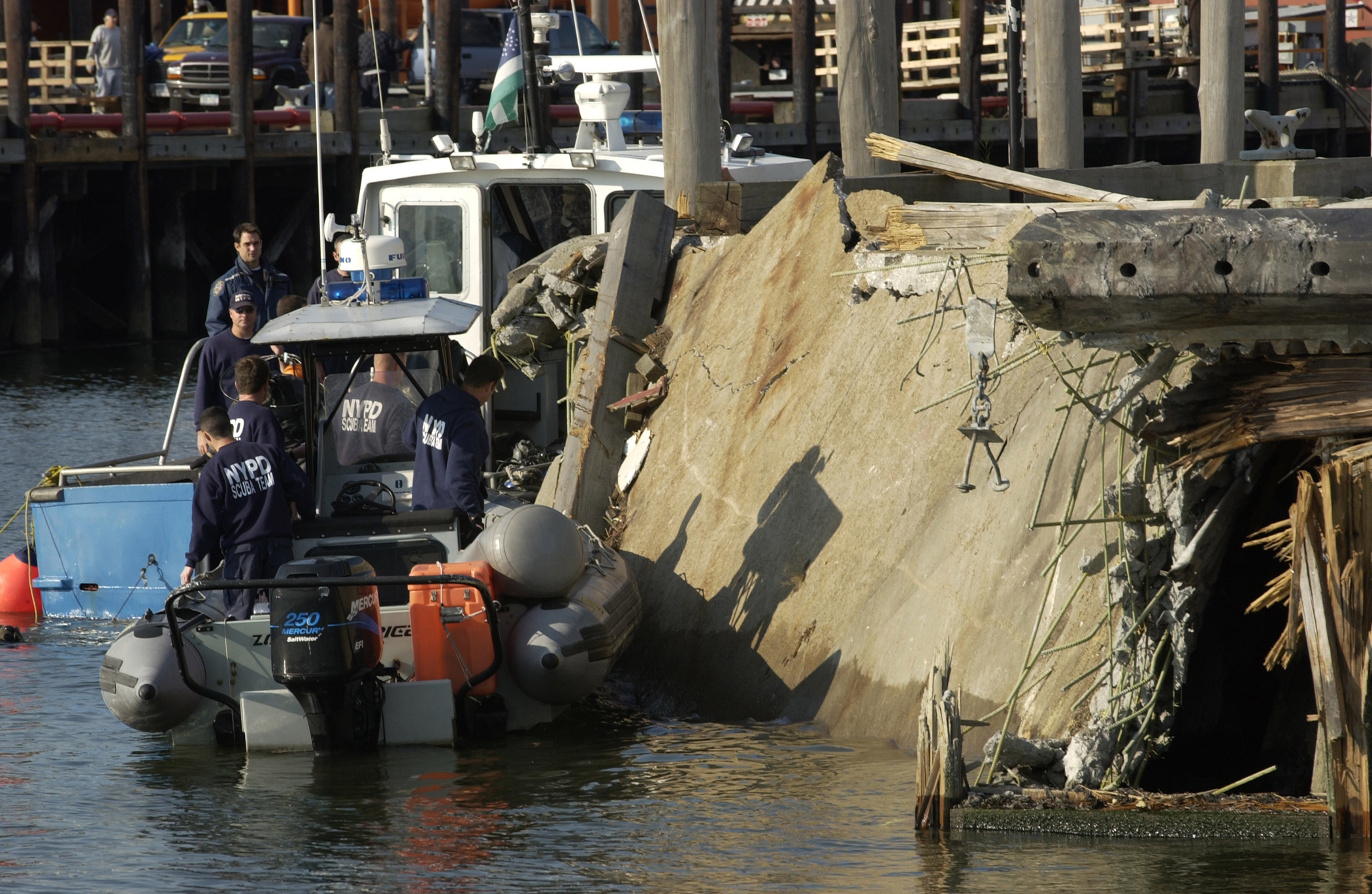
Damage to the pier after the crash

The ferry's pilot, Richard J. Smith, fled the scene and was found shortly afterwards at home. Smith had tried to kill himself by cutting his wrists and shooting himself in the chest twice with a pellet gun. He was taken to the same hospital where victims of the crash were being treated.

It was later determined that Smith had lost consciousness while at the ship's controls. He had taken the painkillers tramadol and Tylenol PM, both of which can cause drowsiness, blurred vision and seizures, any or all of which may have contributed to the crash. The city rules required two pilots to be present during docking, but this rule had not been enforced by the management of the ferry service, and Smith was the only pilot in the wheelhouse at the time.

A total of five people were charged in the U.S. District Court for the Eastern District of New York. Smith was charged with eleven counts of seaman's manslaughter as well as making false statements in his medical report when applying to the U.S. Coast Guard for a renewal of his pilot's license. His doctor, William Tursi, was charged for lying on the same report. The city's ferry director, Patrick Ryan, was also charged with seaman's manslaughter and making false statements arising from his failure to enforce the two-pilot rule. Michael J. Gansas, the ferry's captain, was charged with lying to investigators. John Mauldin, the port captain, was charged with obstruction of justice and lying to investigators; he falsely claimed that information regarding the two-pilot rule had been distributed to employees.

On August 4, 2004, Smith pleaded guilty to seaman's manslaughter. He was sentenced to 18 months in prison on January 10, 2006. New York's former city ferry director, Patrick Ryan, who had also pleaded guilty to seaman's manslaughter, was sentenced to a year and a day.

The crash resulted in 191 civil lawsuits against the City, leading to more than $90 million in settlements to victims and their families. Structural repairs cost $6.9 million for the boat and $1.4 million for the pier.

The crash was at first said by New York City to be an Act of God, with attorneys arguing that the Department of Transportation should not be held responsible for the crash, an argument that disturbed many survivors and New York City residents. City attorneys, citing a 19th-century maritime law, would later argue that the total amount of damages sought against the city should not exceed the $14.4 million value of the ferryboat. On February 26, 2007, U.S. District Judge Edward Korman rejected this argument and held that the city could not cap damages, writing: "The city's failure to provide a second pilot or otherwise adopt a reasonable practice that addresses the issue of pilot incapacitation was plainly a substantial factor in causing the disaster."

Despite these rulings and a similar, independent federal probation report by officer Tony Garoppolo into the culpability of the ferry service's upper management, in which he viewed "the lion's share of culpability in this case as resting with the high level management of the Ferry Service", no other employees of the New York City Department of Transportation were prosecuted.

On May 8, 2010, the same boat was involved in another crash, due to a mechanical failure. The impact caused 37 injuries, one of which was serious.
