= Seaman's Manslaughter Statute =

U.S. criminal statute for deaths on ships and boats

Steamboat Act of 1838

United States Congress
- Long title: An Act to provide for the better security of the lives of passengers on board of vessels propelled in whole or in part by steam
- Enacted: July 7, 1838

Summary
- Vessel owners and operators can be charged for criminal manslaughter for deaths resulting from misconduct or negligence aboard vessels in United States waters

The Seaman's Manslaughter Statute, codified at 18 U.S.C. § 1115, criminalizes misconduct or negligence that result in deaths involving vessels (ships and boats) on waters in the jurisdiction of the United States.

The statute exposes three groups to criminal liability:

- ship's officers, such as captains, engineers, and pilots;
- those having responsibility for the vessel's condition, such as owners, charterers, and inspectors; and
- corporate management.

Unlike common law manslaughter, which requires a mens rea or mental state of gross negligence or heat of passion in absence of malice, this statute requires only simple negligence — a breach of duty to perform an act or omission in violation of a standard of care. The accident need not occur on a boat, and the threshold of criminal liability is lower than in standard manslaughter cases due to the reduced mens rea requirement.

== History ==
Laws of this form date from steamboat accidents in the early 1800s. The first such legislation passed was the Steamboat Act of 1838 (5 Stat. 304), which established that any act of "misconduct, negligence, or inattention" by those responsible for steamboat operation or navigation which results in death shall be deemed guilty of manslaughter. An early case in 1848 established a precedent that prosecutors would not need to prove any malicious intent.

The Steamboat Act of 1852 (10 Stat. 61) amplified the earlier 1838 Act in response to continuing deaths and moved enforcement to the United States Department of the Treasury. "Public officers" and vessel owners were added to the list of those who could be held criminally liable in 1864 (13 Stat. 390). The Steamboat Inspection Service was created in 1871 (16 Stat. 440), which also explicitly made boiler inspectors subject to criminal liability.

The 1904 fire aboard PS General Slocum resulted in another Act in 1905 (33 Stat. 1023) to make executive officers of corporate-owned steamboats criminally liable, and also added the term "neglect" to the list of actionable offenses. By this time, the criminal liabilities had been added to Section 5344 of the Revised Statutes of the United States. The criminal liabilities for seaman's manslaughter were moved to 18 U.S.C. § 1115 in 1948 (62 Stat. 757) and amended in 1994 to remove the maximum US$10,000 fine as an alternative or in addition to incarceration (108 Stat. 2147).

=== Notable cases ===
Cases that established the negligence threshold include US v. Warner (1848), US v. Farnham (1853), US v. Collyer (1855), US v. Keller (1884), and US v. Van Schaick (1904). The last of these refers to the prosecution of Captain William Von Schaick, who was held responsible for the 1904 fire aboard General Slocum which killed 1,021.

The pilot of the Staten Island Ferry MV Andrew J. Barberi lost consciousness while at the controls and crashed into a maintenance pier in October 2003, killing 11. Both the pilot and the city director of ferries were charged with seaman's manslaughter as a result; the director was found to be negligent by failing to enforce a requirement to have two pilots present during docking.

On March 11, 2015, the United States Court of Appeals for the Fifth Circuit published U.S. v. Kaluza, wherein it discussed the individuals included within the statute's "other person" provision. The court determined that two "well site leaders" working on the Deepwater Horizon at the time of the explosion were not "other person[s]." Using the ejusdem generis statutory interpretation rule, the Fifth Circuit reasoned that "well site leaders" did not have the same "common attribute" as vessel captains, engineers, and pilots (individuals who were involved in the "marine operations, maintenance, or navigation of the vessel").

In December 2020, the captain of the MV Conception, Jerry Boylan, was charged with 34 counts of seaman's manslaughter after a fire killed 34 people off the coast of Santa Barbara. Defense attorneys argued that the fire was a single incident, causing prosecutors to issue a superseding indictment of a single count of seaman's manslaughter instead. In August 2022, the judge George H. Wu dismissed his indictment without prejudice as defective, due to the use of negligence instead of gross negligence as the required standard for seaman's manslaughter. Contrary to prior cases and the text of the statute, the district court found that a similar statute for involuntary manslaughter (18 US Code §1112) also lacked an explicit requirement for gross negligence, but the common law understanding at the time implied that Congress understood that manslaughter required gross negligence, and therefore seaman's manslaughter, being a similar crime, should also incorporate the same common law meanings. The government submitted a new indictment on October 18, 2022, and Boyland was found guilty of seaman's manslaughter by a jury on November 6, 2023 and sentenced to four years in prison.

== Text ==
That every captain, engineer, pilot, or other person employed on board of any steamboat or vessel propelled in whole or in part by steam, by whose misconduct, negligence, or inattention to his or their respective duties, the life or lives of any person or persons on board said vessel may be destroyed, shall be deemed guilty of manslaughter, and, upon conviction thereof before any circuit court in the United States, shall be sentenced to confinement at hard labor for a period of not more than ten years.

— §12 of the Steamboat Act of 1838 (5 Stat. 304)

That the provisions of [§12 of the 1838 Act] hereby, extended to the owner or owners of any steamboat or other vessel propelled in whole or in part by steam, and to all public officers, by, or in consequences of, whose fraud, connivance, misconduct, or violation of law, the life or lives of any person or persons on board such steamboat or vessel may be destroyed.

— §6 of the Steamboat Act of 1864 (13 Stat. 390)

That any captain, engineer, or pilot, or other person employed on any steamboat or vessel, by whose misconduct, negligence, or inattention to his or their respective duties on such vessel, the life of any person shall be destroyed, or [if] in consequence of fraud, connivance, misconduct, or violation of law by any owner or inspector, or other public officer, the life of any person shall be destroyed, he or they shall be deemed guilty of manslaughter, and, upon conviction thereof before any circuit court of the United States, shall be sentenced to confinement at hard labor for a period of not more than ten years.

— §57 of the Steamboat Act of 1871 (16 Stat. 440)

Every captain, engineer, pilot, or other person employed on any steamboat or vessel, by whose misconduct, negligence, or inattention to his duties on such vessel the life of any person is destroyed, and every owner, charterer, inspector, or other public officer, through whose fraud, neglect, connivance, misconduct, or violation of law, the life of any person is destroyed, shall be deemed guilty of the felony of manslaughter, and upon conviction thereof, before any circuit court of the United States, shall be sentenced to pay a fine of not more than ten thousand dollars, or to confinement at hard labor for a period of not more than ten years, or either, or both: Provided, That when the owner or charterer of any steamboat or vessel shall be a corporation, any executive officer of such corporation, for the time being actually charged with the control and management of the operation, equipment, or navigation of such steamboat or vessel, who has knowingly and willfully caused or allowed such fraud, neglect, connivance, misconduct, or violation of law, by which the life of any person is destroyed, shall be deemed guilty of the felony of manslaughter, and upon conviction thereof, before any circuit court of the United States, shall be sentenced to confinement at hard labor for a period of not more than ten years.

— §5 of the Steamboat Act of 1905 (33 Stat. 1023)

== See also ==
- General Slocum disaster
