= List of shopping malls in Maryland =

This is a list of shopping malls in Maryland, including defunct ones.

== Allegany County ==
- Country Club Mall - Cumberland

== Anne Arundel County ==
- Arundel Mills - Hanover
  - Arundel Mills Marketplace
- Marley Station Mall - Glen Burnie
- Annapolis Mall - Annapolis
- Harundale Plaza - Glen Burnie
- Centre at Glen Burnie - Glen Burnie

Defunct

- Harundale Mall - Glen Burnie
- Glen Burnie Mall - Glen Burnie

== Baltimore City ==
- The Shops at Canton Crossing
- Harborplace pavilions
- Mondawmin Mall
- Reisterstown Road Plaza
- The Rotunda
- The Village of Cross Keys
- Broadway Market
- Lexington Market
- Harborplace Redevelopment (coming soon)

Defunct

- The Brokerage
  - The Gallery at Harborplace
- Old Town Mall

== Baltimore County ==
- Security Square Mall - Woodlawn
- The Shops at Kenilworth - Towson
- Circle East - Towson
- Towson Town Center - Towson
- White Marsh Mall - White Marsh
- Mill Station - Owings Mills
- White Marsh Town Center - White Marsh

Defunct

- Eastpoint Mall - Dundalk
- Owings Mills Mall - Owings Mills
- Towson Square - Towson (only Cinemark Towson and XD is still open)
- Towson Commons – Towson (original mall)

== Carroll County ==
- TownMall of Westminster

Defunct

- Carrolltown Centre

== Charles County ==
- St. Charles Towne Center - Waldorf

== Frederick County ==
- Francis Scott Key Mall - Frederick

Defunct

- Frederick Towne Mall - Frederick

== Harford County ==
- Harford Mall - Bel Air

== Howard County ==
- The Mall in Columbia - Columbia
- Savage Mill - Savage

== Montgomery County ==
- Clarksburg Premium Outlets
- Ellsworth Place - Silver Spring
- Westfield Montgomery - Bethesda
- Westfield Wheaton - Wheaton
- Lakeforest Redevelopment - Gaithersburg (coming soon)

Defunct

- White Flint Mall - North Bethesda
- Lakeforest Mall - Gaithersburg

== Prince George's County ==
- Beltway Plaza Mall - Greenbelt
- Bowie Town Center - Bowie
- The Centre at Forestville - Forestville
- The Shops at Iverson - Hillcrest Heights
- The Mall at Prince Georges - Hyattsville

Defunct

- Landover Mall - Landover
- Laurel Mall - Laurel

== Queen Anne's County ==
- Queenstown Premium Outlets

== Washington County ==
- Hagerstown Premium Outlets - Hagerstown
- Valley Mall - Hagerstown

== Wicomico County ==
- The Centre at Salisbury

Defunct

- Salisbury Mall

== Worcester County ==
- Tanger Outlets Ocean City
- Gold Coast Mall - Ocean City

Defunct

- Ocean Plaza Mall
