= USS Vaud J. =

Patrol vessel of the United States Navy

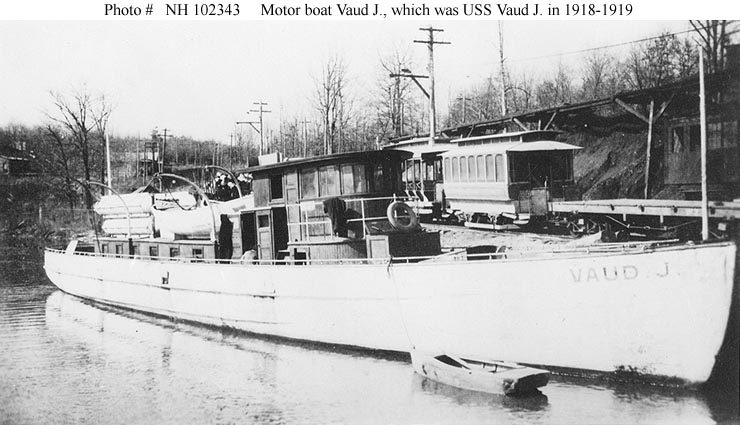
- Vaud J. as a civilian motorboat sometime between 1907 and 1918.

History

United States
- Name: USS Vaud J.
- Namesake: Previous name retained
- Builder: Thomas Johnson, Wildwood, New Jersey
- Completed: 1907
- Acquired: 17 or 27 September 1918
- Commissioned: Never
- In service: 1918
- Stricken: 30 June 1919
- Fate: Sold 30 June 1919
- Notes: Operated as civilian motorboat Vaud J. 1907-1918 and 1919-1932

General characteristics
- Type: Patrol vessel
- Tonnage: 63 Gross register tons
- Length: 101 ft 0 in (30.78 m)
- Beam: 19 ft 8 in (5.99 m)
- Draft: 4 ft 6 in (1.37 m) mean
- Speed: 8.6 knots
- Complement: 8
- Armament: None

USS Vaud J. (SP-3361) was a United States Navy patrol vessel in service from 1918 to 1919.

Vaud J. was built in 1907 as a private motorboat of the same name by Thomas Johnson at Wildwood, New Jersey. She was the property of A. L. Dunn of Govans, Maryland, on 23 April 1917 when the U.S. Navy inspected her for possible World War I service as a section patrol boat but deemed her unsuitable for use by either the Navy or the United States Army. On 23 September 1918, however, the Navy reinspected Vaud J. at Bear Creek near Baltimore, Maryland, and apparently found her acceptable, because it took control of her on 27 September 1918 and assigned her the section patrol number 3361.

Although Vaud J. never was commissioned, she was assigned to the Bureau of Ordnance and towed by the tug USS Tioga (1916) to the Naval Proving Ground at Indian Head, Maryland, where she operated in connection with range construction work into the spring of 1919.

Vaud J. was stricken from the Navy List on 30 June 1919 and simultaneously sold to the Chesapeake Water Supply Company. She was carried on lists of American merchant vessels into the early 1920s, but her owner was not listed. From 1924 to 1929, she was the property of Hurley Booye of Cape May, New Jersey, until either late 1929 or early 1930 when Harry Mogok of Cape May purchased her. Vaud J. operated until 1932, when she apparently was discarded and her name disappears from the mercantile listings.
