= Govans, Baltimore =

Coordinates: 39°21′46″N 76°36′35″W

Govans Govanstown
- Neighborhood of Baltimore
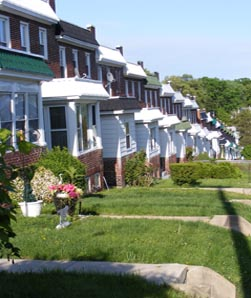
- Row houses in Govans

- Location within Baltimore
- Country: United States
- State: Maryland
- City: Baltimore
- Time zone: UTC-5 (Eastern)
  - Summer (DST): EDT
- ZIP code: 21212
- Area code: 410, 443, and 667

Govans is a neighborhood located in northeastern Baltimore, Maryland. It includes the communities of Mid-Govans, Rosebank, Lothian, Benninghause, Woodbourne McCabe, Winston-Govans, Homeland, and Richnor Springs.

== History ==
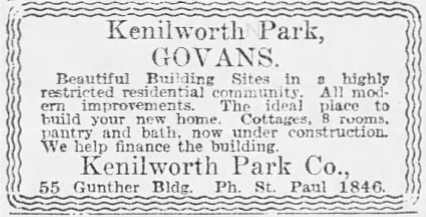
1920 Baltimore Sun advertisement for racially restricted houses in Govans.

The area of Govans was originally granted to William Govane, a wealthy Baltimore shipowner, in 1755 by Frederick Calvert, the sixth Lord Baltimore. Govane named his land “Drumquehastle,” (aka Drumcastle) after the family’s estate in Scotland. William’s son, William James Govane, inherited the estate, and built a store around the current intersection of York Road and Woodbourne Avenue. The Govane estate was divided up and sold off after James’ death in 1807, yet the Govane name remained, and the area eventually became known as Govanstown and then Govans. In 1808, the York-town Turnpike, running from York, Pennsylvania, to Baltimore Harbor was established over a historic Indian route. Soon the road was one of the main thoroughfares out of Baltimore and the area of Govans became a popular resting point for traveling farmers from Pennsylvania.

Prior to the passage of the Fair Housing Act of 1968, racial covenants were used in Baltimore to exclude African-Americans and other minorities. A May 28, 1920 advertisement in the Baltimore Sun advertised houses in the Kenilworth Park section of Govans as "highly restricted".

== Prominent residents and industry ==
The oldest remaining building in Govans is the former Govanstown Hotel that was built in 1840 to house the area’s influx of travelers. Bellona Avenue became another important route from the large Bellona Gunpowder Mills North of Govans on the Jones Falls. However, most of Govans was still a rural agricultural farmland that lured some of the city’s most prominent citizens. The Perine family owned an extensive estate in present-day Homeland, while on the other side of Govans, Baltimore businessman and philanthropist Enoch Pratt owned 95 acres of agricultural land where he built his “Tivoli” house. Just north was philanthropist and art collector William Walters' “St. Mary’s” house and estate. The neighborhood was also home to a thriving flower-growing horticultural industry. The York-town turnpike was expanded by the Yorktown Turnpike Railway in 1863 which began streetcar traffic. In 1890 electric cars replaced the horse drawn cars and greatly improved transportation from Baltimore into the expanding suburbs.

== 20th century urbanization ==
Towards the beginning of the 20th century, Govans was becoming increasingly urban, including expanding residential neighborhoods and business blocks along the York Road corridor. The automobile quickly replaced the streetcar and connected Baltimore even further into the surrounding county. In 1918, Baltimore officially annexed Govans part of a 35 square mile expansion to the city limits. After the Great Depression, York Road undertook new developments such as the grand Art Deco Senator Theatre built in 1939. In 1948, Baltimore department store, Hochschild, Kohn, opened their second branch location in Govans at the corner of York Road and Belvedere Avenue, in what was deemed one of Baltimore’s most prosperous neighborhoods. Yet by the mid-1960s, Govans was facing the economic hardships prevalent throughout the city.

== 1980s decay and subsequent revival ==
The neighborhood experienced an influx of black residents that was countered by white flight from the area. The Hochschild Kohn store closed in 1984, along with dozens of other stores along the York Road corridor. The Belvedere Market was built in 1987, but closed in 1995. Over the last couple of decades, community activists and organizations have helped bring new development and finances into Govans. Belvedere Square reopened in 2003 and the Senator Theatre reopened after extensive renovations in 2013. In 2013, the York Road Corridor Collective, led by nearby Loyola University Maryland, hired a consulting team to blueprint long term improvements for Govans and the York Road corridor.
