= Frederick Towne Mall =

Defunct mall in Maryland, United States

District 40
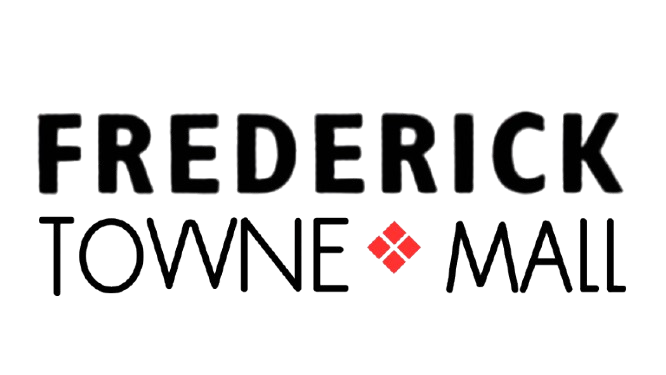

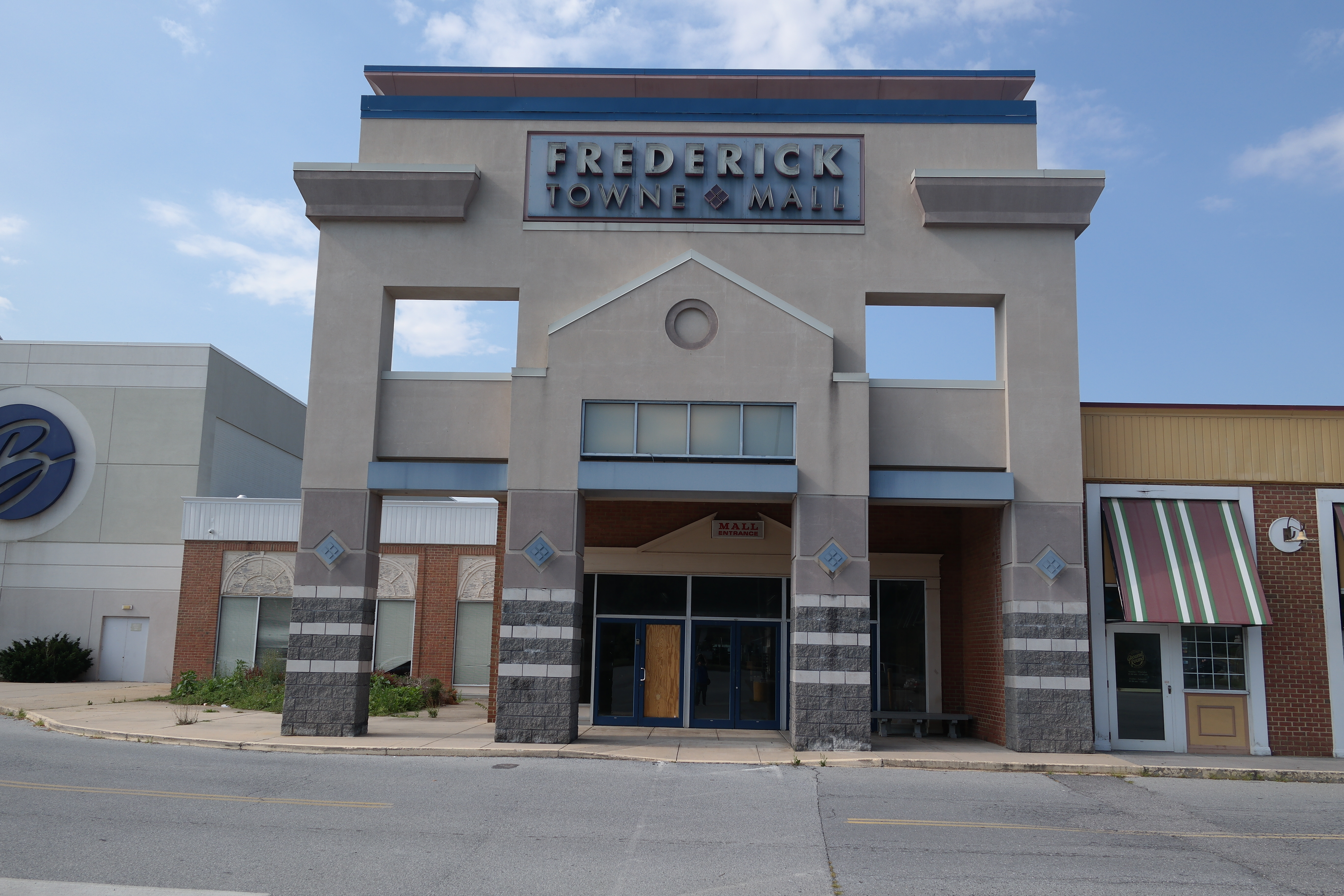
- Main entrance next to Boscov's
- Location: Frederick, Maryland, United States
- Coordinates: 39°25′12″N 77°27′19″W
- Address: 1301 W Patrick St, 21702
- Opened: August 17, 1972; 54 years ago
- Renovated: 1995; 2020; 2024
- Closed: April 2013; 13 years ago (interior only)
- Previous names: Frederick Towne Mall (1972–2019)
- Developer: Shopco Advisory Group
- Owner: West Frederick Center LLLP
- Num. of stores: 6
- Num. of anchor tenants: 3
- Floor area: 582,000 square feet (54,100 m^{2})
- Floors: 1 (2 in Boscov's)
- Parking: 3500
- Public transit: TransIT bus: 10, 40, 50, 51, 80
- Website: Archived 2013-04-15 at the Wayback Machine

Frederick Towne Mall, also known by its new name District 40, is a partially-abandoned mall located in Frederick, Maryland, United States. The mall opened in the summer of 1972 on U.S. Route 40 along the "Golden Mile". It closed in April 2013, except for two anchor stores, Boscov's and Home Depot, which remain operational as of then. In November 2019, it was announced that the mall would be renamed District 40 and would become an entertainment center.

== History ==
=== 1970–1999: Development, opening, early years, and renovation ===
Frederick Towne Mall was first announced in 1970; early plans called for the mall to be between 350,000 and 400,000 square feet (33,000 and 37,000 m^{2}), but plans were later pushed to 630,000 square feet (59,000 m^{2}), with a central second floor for service tenants. An opening date was set for April 1971. By March 1971, anchors for the mall were announced, which were Montgomery Ward, JCPenney, and Eyerly's, with Wards set to open in the fall of 1971, followed by the rest of the mall "in about a year". Other tenants announced included McCrory's, Peoples Drug, Thom McAn, RadioShack, Foxwood Casuals, Chess King, General Nutrition Centers, Kay Jewelers, and Waldenbooks.

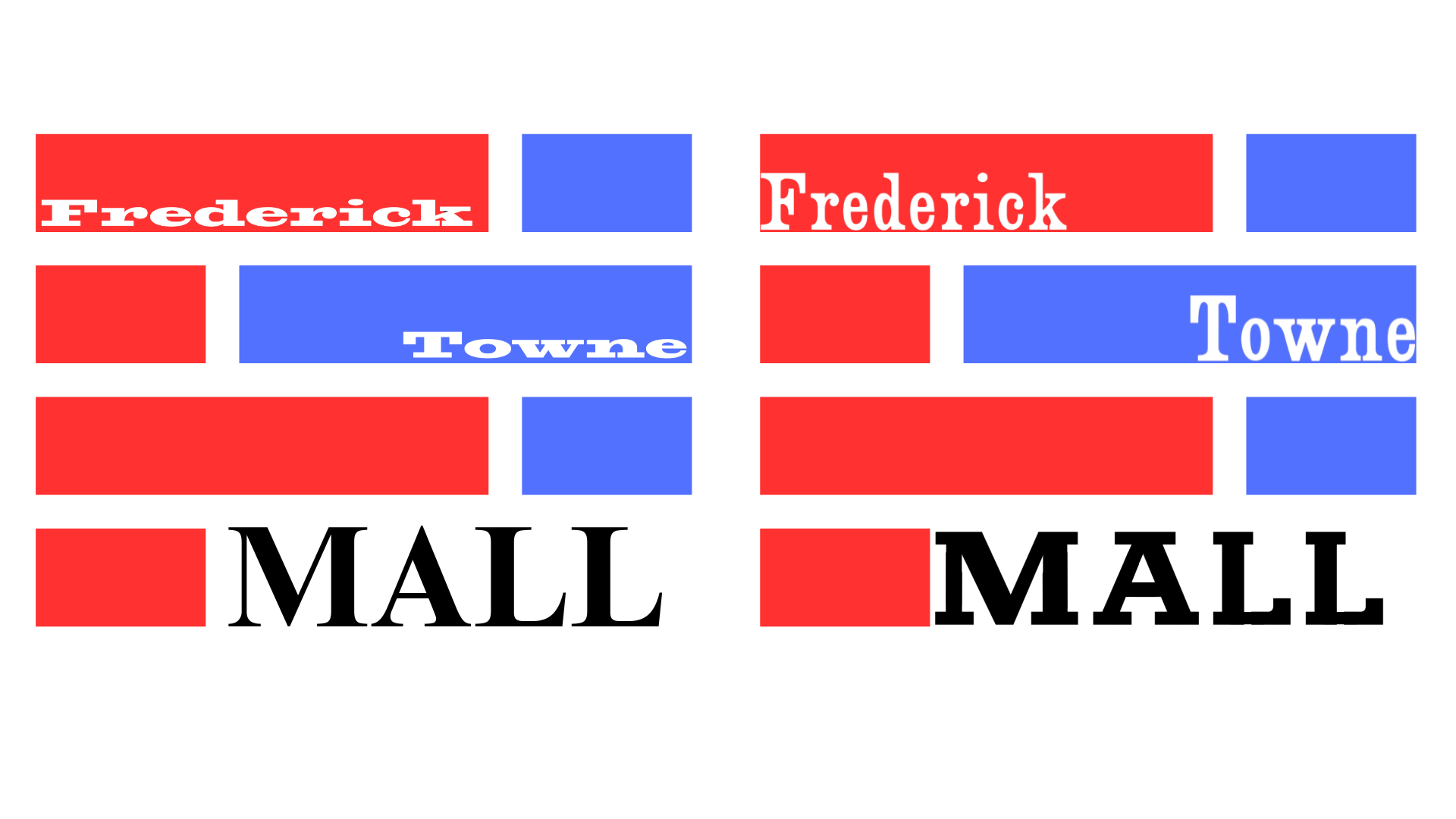
The two former logos of the Frederick Towne Mall, pictured here is the logo used on flyers, bags etc. (left), and the logo mainly used on the outdoor sign facing Route 40 (right). These logos were used from the mall's opening until its 1995 renovation.

Wards opened on November 10, 1971, followed by the announcement of Eyerly's on August 1, 1972. The rest of the mall opened on August 17, at 4 p.m. EDT, with 50 tenants and over 5,000 people attending the grand opening. The project costed $14 million. At its peak, the mall had 73 stores. A large appeal was its large footprint and its extensive parking, which had 3,500 spaces.

The area surrounding the mall eventually intensified with low income housing, as did violent crime in the surrounding area. After a series of well-publicized events earned the mall a reputation for crime and frequent fights, mall tenants began relocating their dollars to a safer retail district across the city near the competing Francis Scott Key Mall, which opened in 1978.

In the 1980s, Eyerly's became The Bon-Ton. On November 4, 1983, the mall was sold to a group of investors for $31.5 million. The mall was sold again on February 23, 1989, to J. DeBartolo and Equitable Real Estate Investment Management for nearly $600,000.

On December 1, 1995, the Frederick Towne Mall completed a $4 million renovation. This included new flooring with ceramic tiles, five new skylights, new ceiling tiles, new entranceways, and landscaping improvements costing $140,000. The twin-screen movie theater was replaced by Hoyts Cinemas 10, which opened on December 20, 1996. The mall had over 60 retailers around this time. The mall was sold to investors in New York on December 23, 1999.

=== 1997–2019: Decline and closure ===
Hoyts Cinemas in January 2012

On March 5, 1997, JCPenney opened in the Francis Scott Key mall alongside a conversion and renovation of the older Frederick Towne Mall location to a JCPenney Home Store. Montgomery Ward closed in 2001 due to bankruptcy, which would come after a $3 million remodel a year prior. The space was replaced in the summer of 2004 by The Home Depot, which wouldn't have an interior mall entrance. JCPenney closed on January 17, 2003, and was renovated and replaced with Boscov's in October 2003. In 2005, Gentlemen's Choice Barber Shop, the last remaining original tenant, moved out.

In 2006, proposals were made to redevelop the mall into a mixed-use complex. However, by 2009, economic issues caused by the Great Recession led to the project to be canceled.

On December 11, 2007, the reputation for crime the mall increased, when a woman was robbed and beaten while exiting Bon-Ton. The Hoyts Cinemas closed two years later, by June 22. (Note: Hoyts Cinemas was not listed as a tenant on the Golden Mile Occupancy Data dated to June 15, 2009) 38 storefronts were vacant at this time.

The main mall corridor after its abandonment, lined with empty storefronts

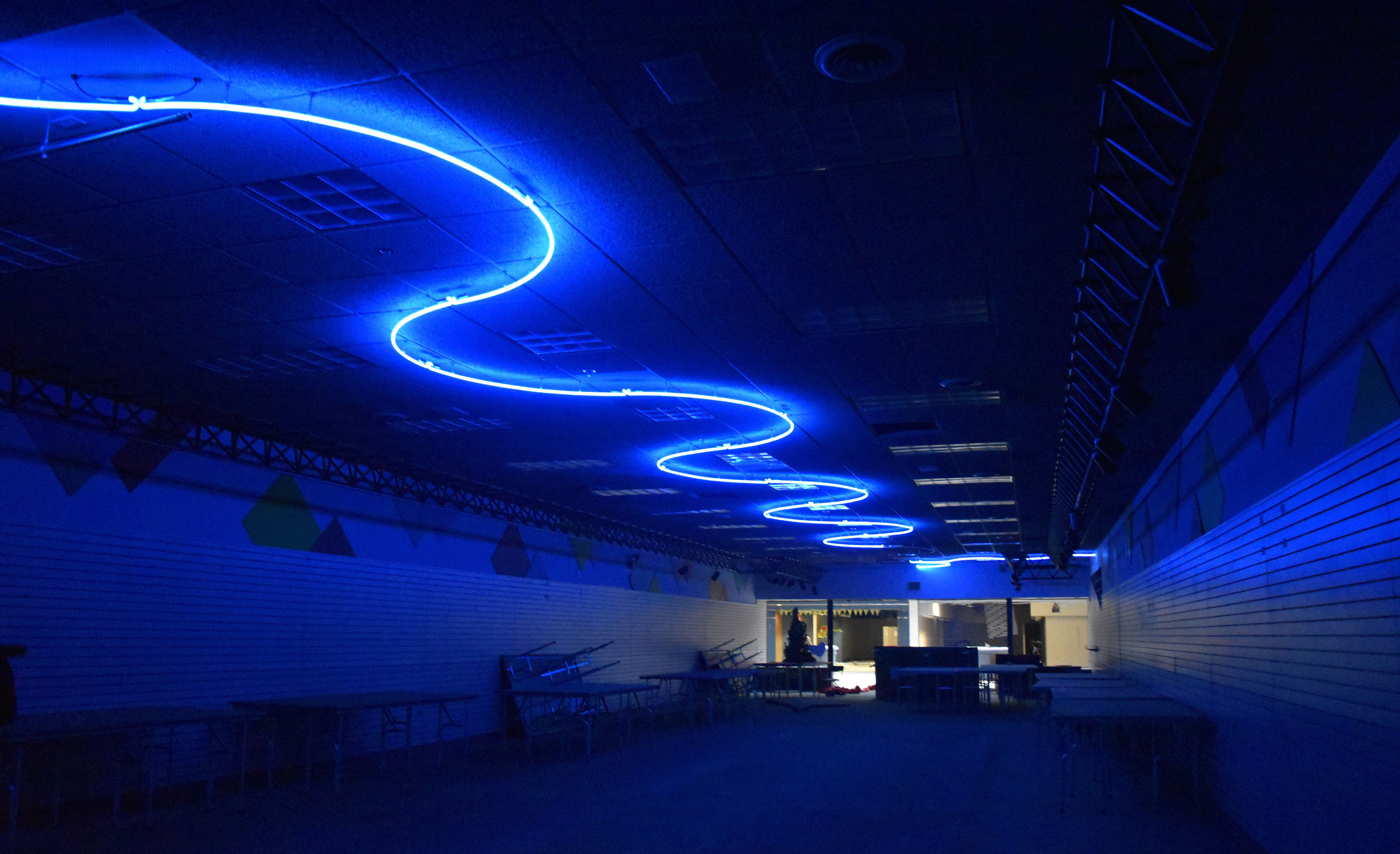
This piece of blue neon lighting, which is located in one of the mall's empty stores, is a common tourist attraction among urban explorers. This light is also what gave the mall the nickname "Neon Dreams Mall" coined by YouTuber and urban explorer Dan Bell.

On November 8, 2010, it was announced that Bon-Ton and their furniture gallery would be closing at the end of January 2011, leaving the mall without any original anchors. John's Hallmark, the last interior tenant, closed its doors in April 2013; however, by this time it was selling merchandise out of its back door due to the closure of the mall's interior to the public in early April.

In May 2014, FBI training sessions were held on the property. On August 10, three men were charged with burglary and trespassing after breaking into the mall by prying one of its doors. Officers went inside and arrested the three men. Their motive for breaking into the mall remains unclear.

On July 18, 2013, it was announced that Walmart had plans to open on the site. In October 2014, the land was approved for redevelopment as Frederick Towne Center. Boscov's and Home Depot would be kept and the mall in between would be demolished. The new site plan would include a 155,000-square-foot (14,400 m^{2}) Walmart. Work on redevelopment began in 2016, with an expected completion of 2017. Walmart, however, canceled their plans for redevelopment in September of that year.

Shortly afterwards, the owner of the property considered selling the mall. On November 23, 2016, there was an auction for the site between December 6 to 8, with a starting bid of $2.5 million. On February 24, 2017, the property was sold to a private investment company, West Frederick Center LLLP, headed by urologist Mohammed Mohiuddin.

On July 21, 2019 two men broke into the mall and uploaded a video on Twitter of themselves vandalizing and destroying glass and lighting inside the building. The owners decided to not press charges.

=== 2019–present: Redevelopment as District 40 ===
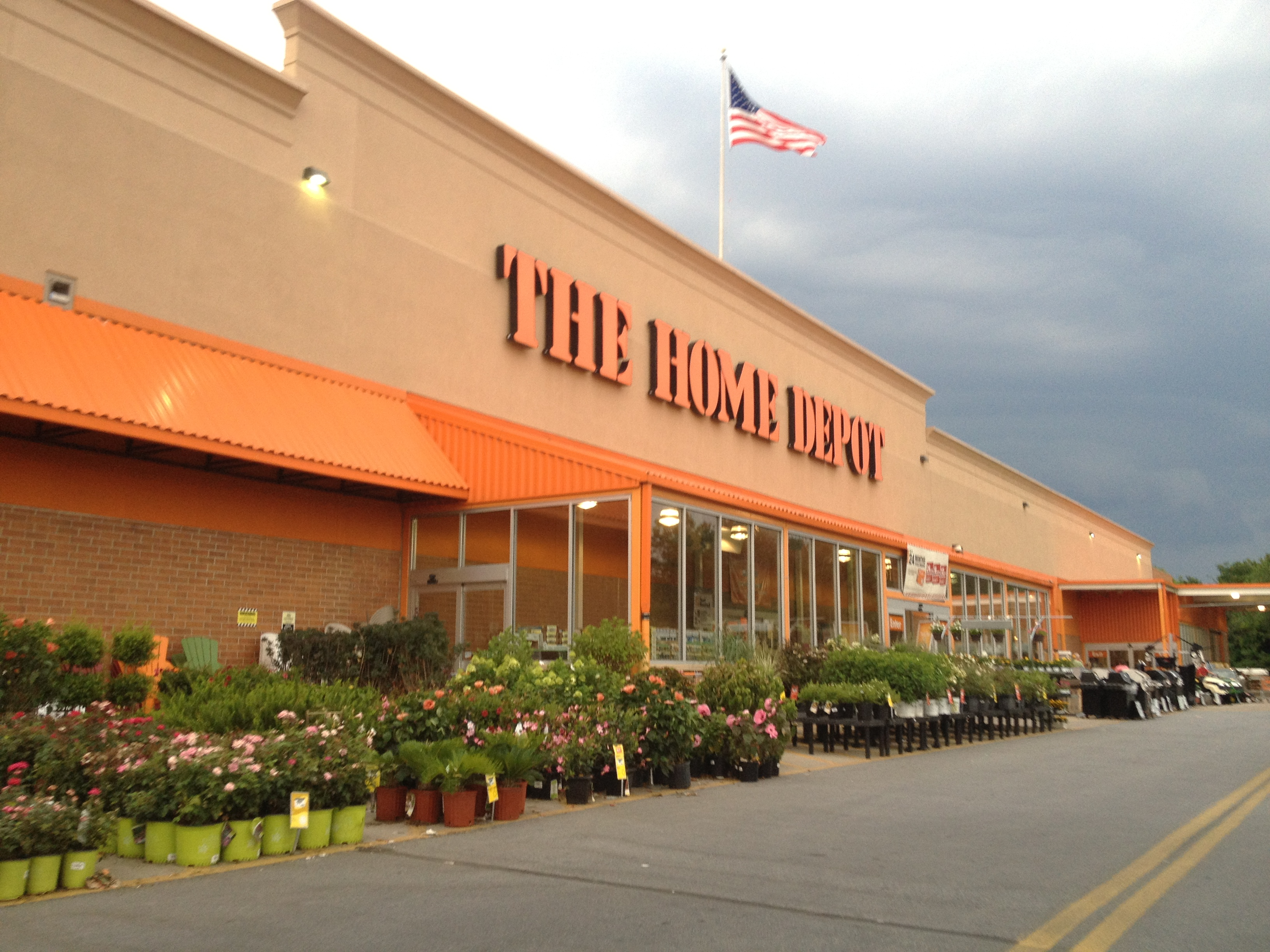
The Home Depot in 2012

On November 11, 2019, it was officially announced that the mall was being renamed District 40 and may include tenants with business such as go-karts, a bowling alley, a video arcade, a trampoline park, and restaurants. According to the report, Home Depot, which is connected to the old mall, is technically not included in the property and Boscov's still has a lease, but no further details were disclosed about the future of the store.

By June 30, 2020, Frederick Furniture opened. On July 9, Taj Mahal Indian Restaurant opened in the former Ground Round site. On September 4, Warehouse Cinemas opened in the former Hoyts Cinemas 10 site, taking up an entire wing of the mall and completely renovating the area.

In July 2022, it was announced that Big Country Lanes Bowling Alley would replace the former Bon-Ton using the liquidated assets of the defunct Terrace Lanes Bowling Alley, which had closed earlier that year. In December 2025, Big Country Lanes Bowling Alley deemed the location "unworkable" and has since relocated its plans to the former Big Lots building across the street.

On May 17, 2023, 40-year-old Jose Pedro Hernandez was found covered in blood and barely breathing in the parking lot of The Home Depot. He had been stabbed in the neck and later died of his injuries at Frederick Health Hospital. Hernandez's murderer, Santos Felipe Reyes Valle, was arrested a few weeks later and was found guilty by a jury and sentenced to life in prison on June 23, 2025.

As of 2026, both Home Depot and Boscov's still operate at the site. A new junior anchor tenant known as Spinners Pinball Arcade was announced to renovate and use the former Bon-Ton space towards the back of the mall. Spinners leased the location in October 2023 and on February 20, 2024, they closed their East Street location. Their new location opened in January 2026. As of April 2026, Taj Mahal underwent renovations to be rebranded to Saffron Grill & Bar after changing ownership in December 2025.

== Gallery ==
The Ground Round

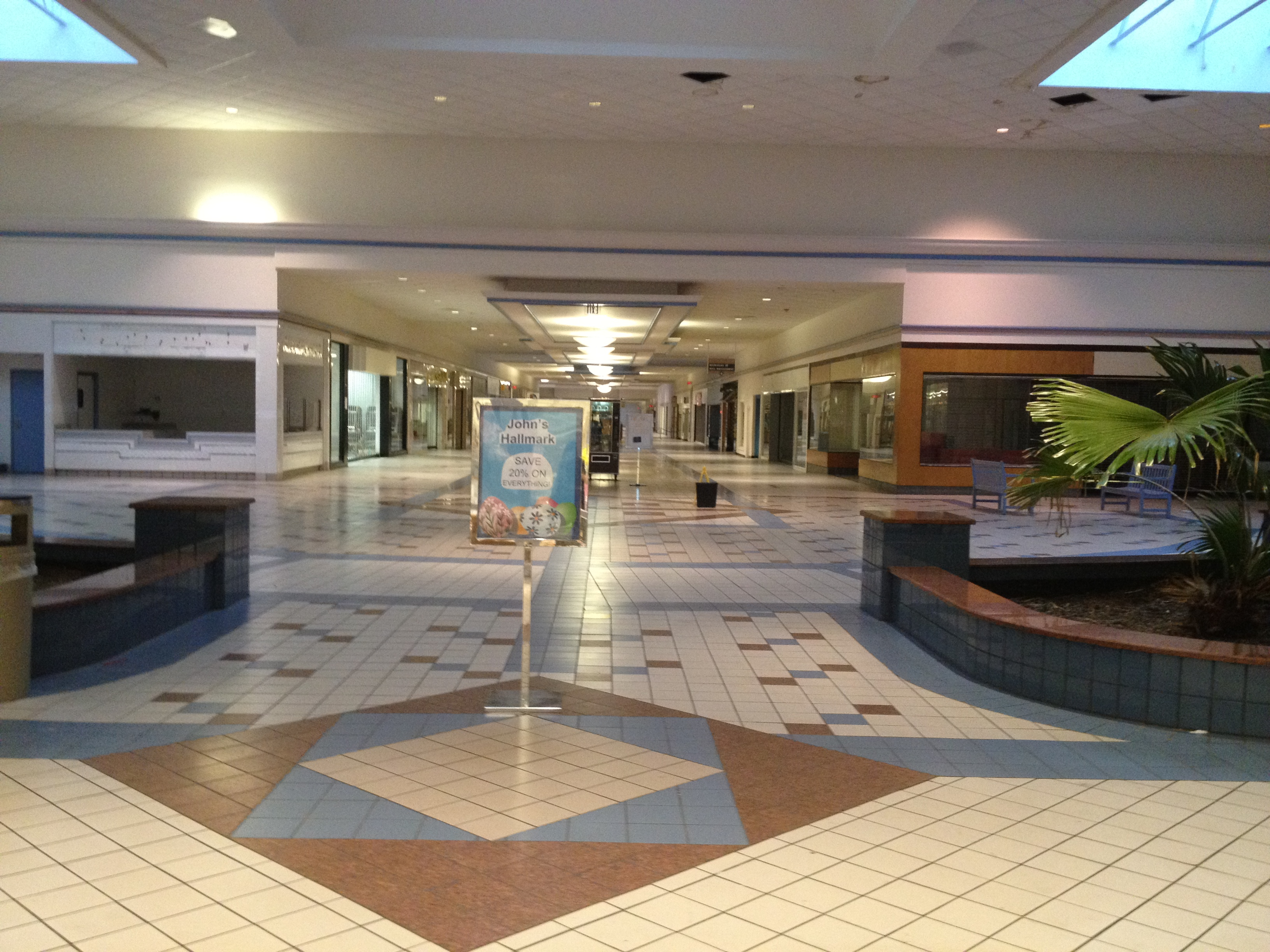
Interior view from Boscov's

Mall pylon

Boscov's

Former Bon-Ton

== See also ==
- List of shopping malls in Maryland
- Valley Mall (Hagerstown)
- Foxcroft Towne Center at Martinsburg
- TownMall of Westminster
