= Harundale Mall =

Defunct mall in Anne Arundel County, Maryland, U.S.

Coordinates: 39°9′5.56″N 76°36′56.02″W

- Location: Glen Burnie, Maryland, U.S.
- Address: 7440 Ritchie Hwy, 21061
- Opened: October 1, 1958; 68 years ago
- Renovated: 1980
- Closed: 1997; 29 years ago
- Demolished: March 1998 – May 1999
- Developer: Community Research & Development, Inc.
- Owner: Manekin Corporation
- Architect: Rogers, Taliaferro, Kostritsky, & Lamb (RTKL)
- Num. of stores: 45 (at peak)
- Num. of anchor tenants: 1 (at peak)
- Floor area: 368,000 square feet (34,200 m^{2})
- Floors: 1 (2 in Value City)

Harundale Mall, in Glen Burnie, Maryland, United States at the intersection of Ritchie Highway and Aquahart Road, was the first enclosed, air-conditioned mall built east of the Mississippi River.

Originally developed in 1958 by the Baltimore-based James W. Rouse under his development firm, Community Research & Development, Inc. (the predecessor to The Rouse Company), the mall later became outdated, suffering competition from the newer Marley Station Mall. Rouse sold the mall to Manekin Corporation in 1995, and the mall permanently closed in 1997. It was demolished and redeveloped in 1999 as Harundale Plaza, a shopping center anchored by Lidl and Urban Air Trampoline & Adventure Park.

== History ==
=== Opening ===
The mall opened on October 1, 1958. Developed by Community Research & Development Inc, headed by James W. Rouse and designed by architectural firm Rogers, Taliaferro, & Lamb (later RTKL Associates), the fully enclosed and air-conditioned center, which was constructed at a cost of $10 million, was described as the first one of its kind on the east coast. Built around an existing group of six stores on the property, the mall consisted of a total of 350,000 square feet, and featured fountains and plants throughout the mall. The primary "Garden Court" featured a 35-foot cage of "Mynah birds", along with a staircase leading to a balcony restaurant over top a fountain. Major retailers included department stores Hochschild, Kohn, & Co and Brager's, a large Oppenheim Collins branch, both S.S. Kresge and G. C. Murphy variety stores, and Food Fair. Grand opening ceremonies, beginning at 9 AM, featured Governor Theodore McKeldin, James W, Rouse, president of Hochschild, Kohn, & Co Martin Kohn, and various other politicians, including then senator John F. Kennedy.

In 1959, Brager's would convert to the Brager-Gutman's name, with the two store's merger that year. A single screen theater, operated by General Cinemas, opened across from the mall in 1964. By 1971 the mall's Food Fair had also been converted to the new Pantry Pride name.

=== Missing persons ===
The mall was connected to two missing persons cases, in 1969 and 1970. Twenty-year-old Joyce Malecki was last seen at the Harundale Mall on November 11, 1969; she was found dead two days later at a shooting range in Fort Meade, Maryland. The next year, 16-year-old Pamela Conyers was last known as having driven to the Harundale Mall on October 16, before her body was found four days later in a wooded area, near what is now the Waterford Road/Maryland Route 648 overpass along Maryland Route 100.

=== Changes and decline ===
The mall's first renovation began on July 14, 1980. Done by Leblang & Associates, the $250,000 renovation consisted of a total repaint and re-tiling of the mall, in addition to a new "picnic area" in the south court, redesigned kiosks, and expanded planters and seating areas. The mall's Pantry Pride location was sold at auction in 1981 to E-Zee Markets, who went on to close the store in 1983. Hutzler's would acquire the Harundale Mall location of Hochschild, Kohn, & Co in 1984, with that location replacing their existing store at the Southdale Shopping Center. This location would become one of several announced to become "Hutzler's Value Way" in September 1988, before closing later that year. Value City took over the former Hutzler's space in 1989.

The mall, then at 80% occupancy, was put up for sale by owner The Rouse Company in 1995. The next year, McCrory announced it would close its Harundale store once it reached the end of its lease in October, as part of wider store closures as a result of their 1992 bankruptcy. The mall quietly closed in 1997, with only two exterior tenants including Value City staying open. This was followed by the sale of the property to Manekin Corp, who announced plans to demolish the mall and redevelop the property into a strip mall.

== Redevelopment as Harundale Plaza ==
Harundale Plaza
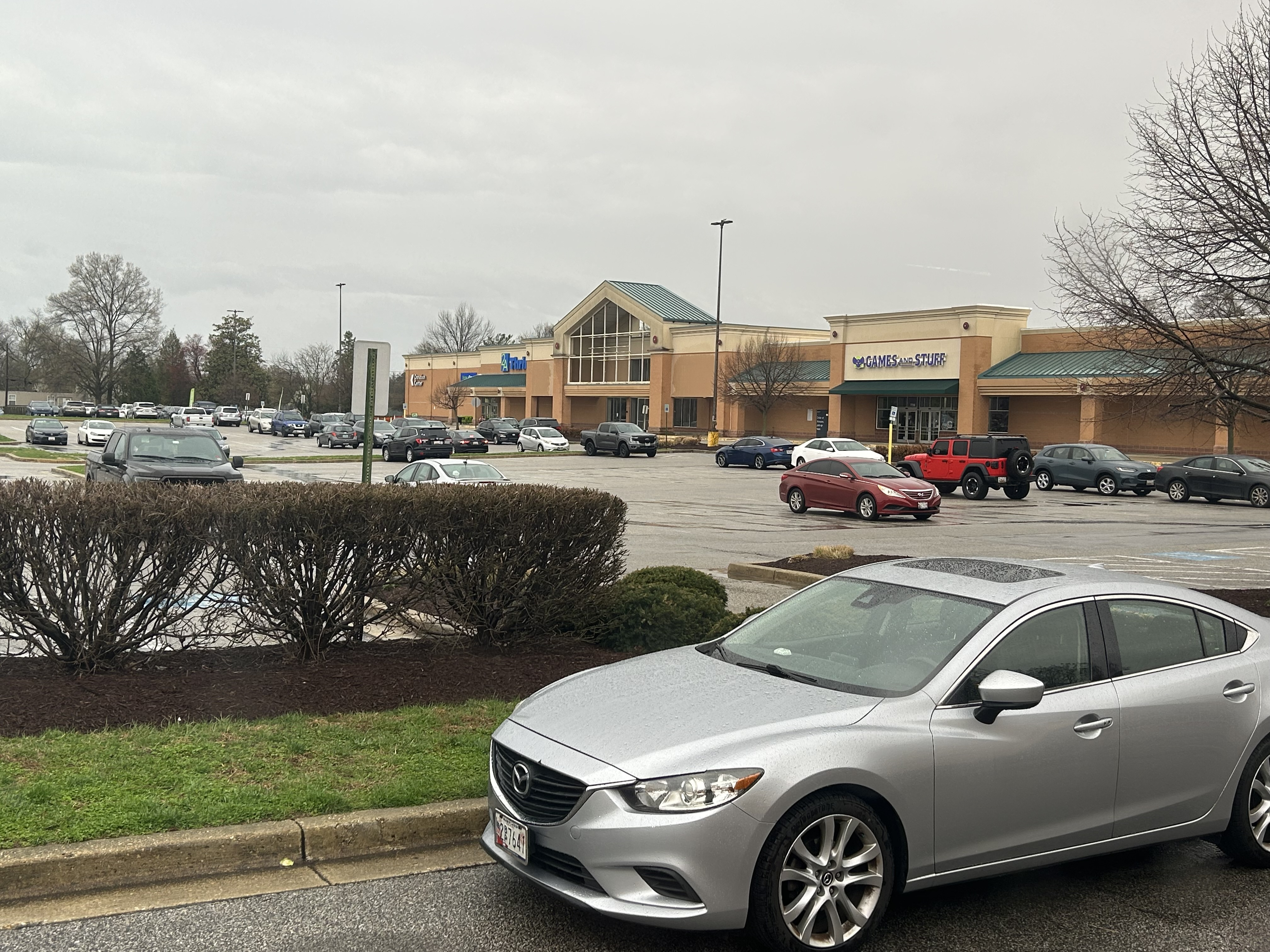
- Exterior view (March 2026)
- Location: Glen Burnie, Maryland, U.S.
- Address: 7900 Governor Ritchie Highway
- Opened: 1999; 27 years ago
- Developer: Manekin Corporation
- Manager: Time Equities Inc.
- Owner: Time Equities Inc.
- Num. of stores: 18
- Num. of anchor tenants: 2
- Floor area: 218,000 sq ft (20,300 m^{2})
- Floors: 1 (2 in Lidl/Urban Air)
- Parking: Parking lot
- Website: Official website

By 1998, anchors for the strip mall had been announced, to include a Superfresh Supermarket and an expanded Value City, with both bank tenants at the former mall, First Union and Crestar, negotiating leases for new locations. Demolition began in March 1998, and was finished the next year. The final major store, AJWright, was announced in November 1999.

Value City closed its doors in 2008, and was converted to a Burlington Coat Factory as part of a deal reached by owner Retail Ventures Inc to sell leases of up to 24 stores. AJWright was converted to HomeGoods in February 2011, and later that year, Superfresh closed its doors. Regency Furniture later opened in that space.

On September 5, 2019, Burlington closed its Harundale location upon moving to the under-construction Centre at Glen Burnie, which had its grand opening the following day.

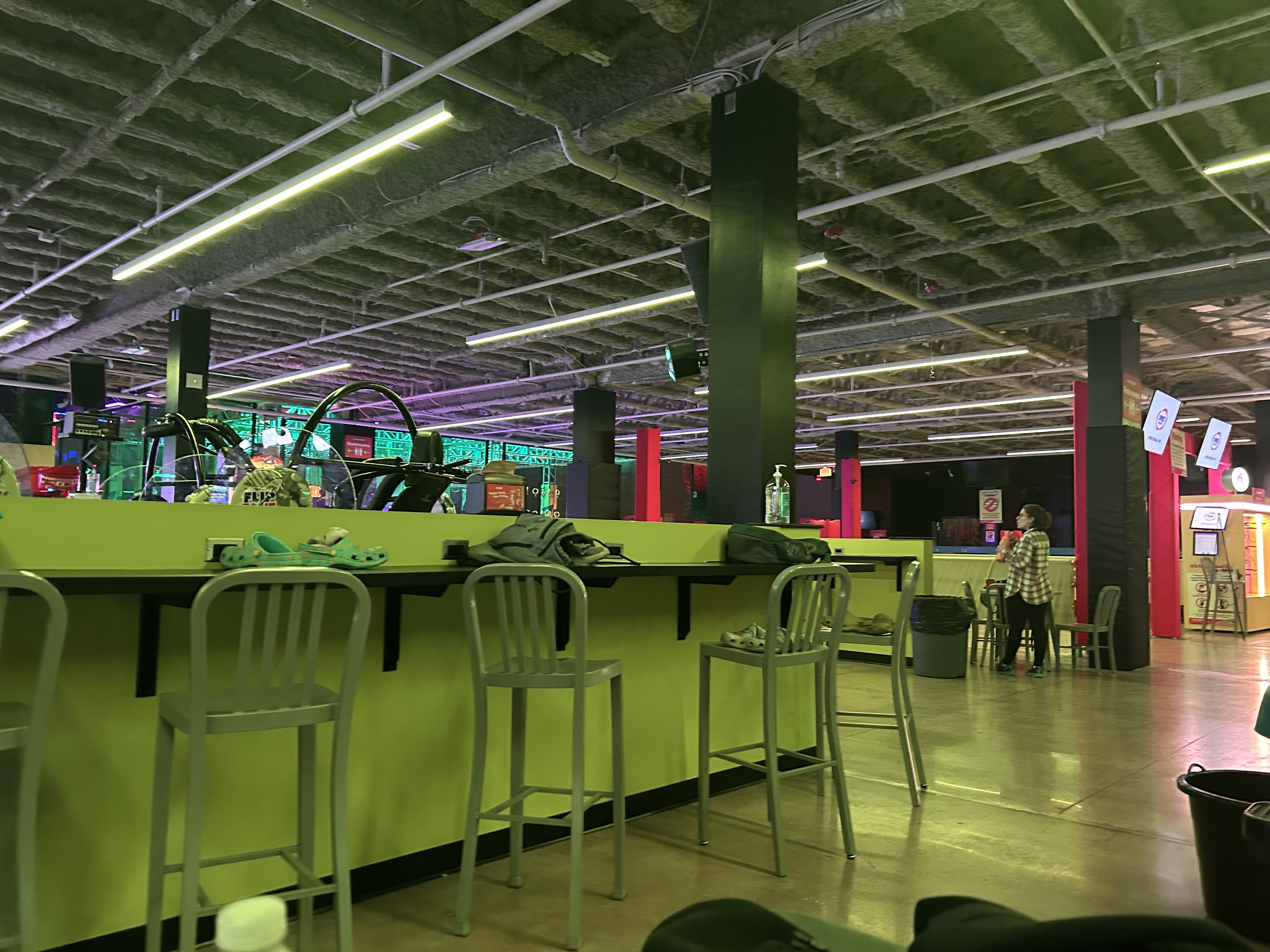
Urban Air in March 2026

The former Burlington space was taken by Urban Air Trampoline & Adventure Park, which opened on July 13, 2024. Lidl, which had opened in 2020, also occupied a portion of the space.
