= First Avenue School =

Building in Glen Burnie, Maryland, US

- U.S. National Register of Historic Places
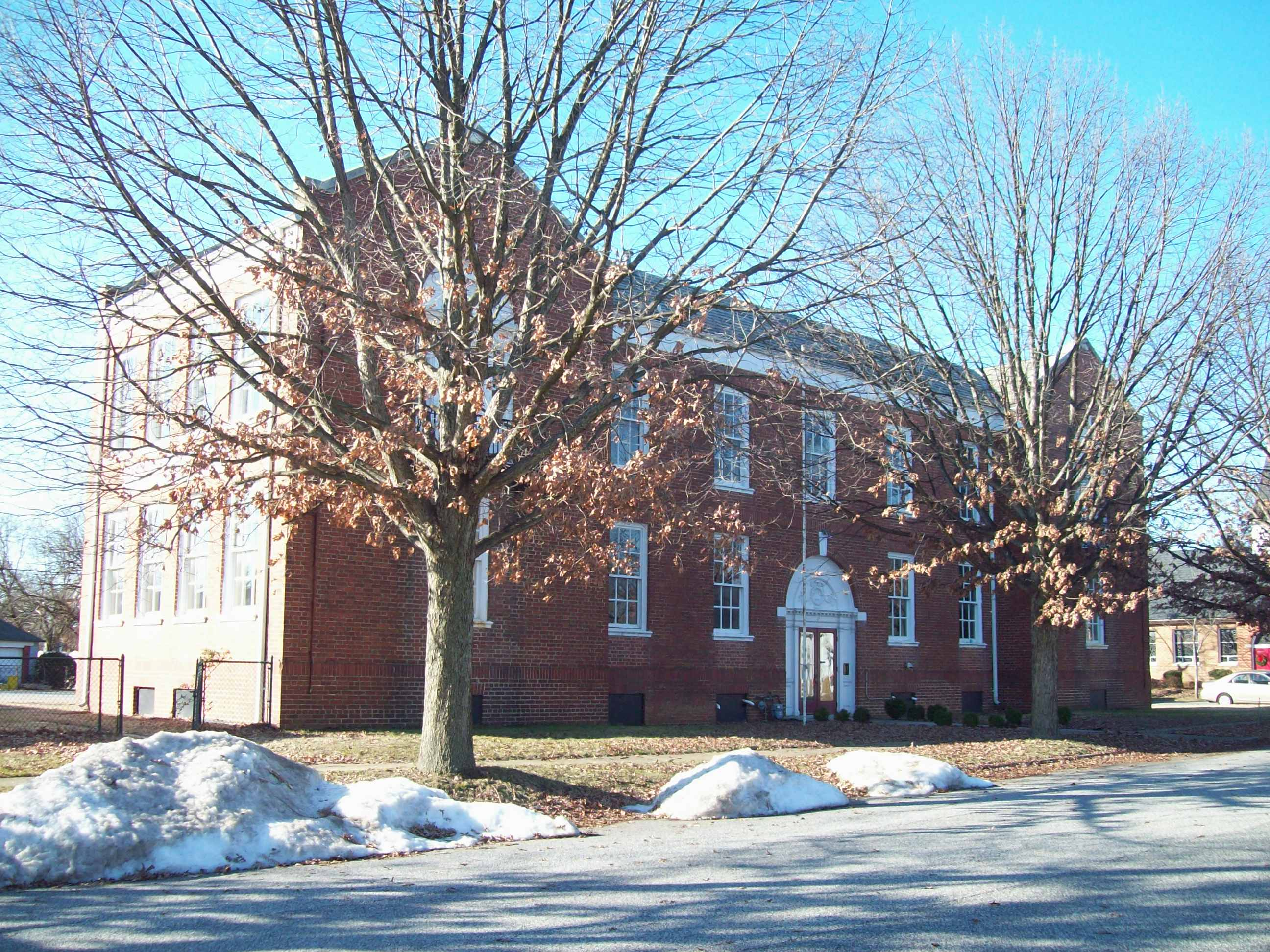
- First Avenue School, December 2009

- Location within Maryland Location within the United States
- Location: 13 SW 1st Ave., Glen Burnie, Maryland
- Coordinates: 39°09′47″N 76°37′39″W
- Area: less than one acre
- Built: 1899
- Architect: Woodfall, Edward
- Architectural style: Classical Revival, Tudor Revival
- NRHP reference No.: 07001309
- Added to NRHP: December 26, 2007

First Avenue School is a historic school building at Glen Burnie, Anne Arundel County, Maryland. It is a large classically inspired building prominently situated on a mostly residential street, one block west of Glen Burnie's central business district. It was built and probably designed by Edward Woodfall, a noted local architect and builder. The school has two sections; one built in 1899 and a second in 1917. The first section is a brick, one-story, two-room, hip-roofed building now serves as a rear wing to the 1917 addition. The large two-story brick gable-roofed Classical Revival-style addition more than quadrupled the school's size. After closure as a school, the building was used as a beauty school and church, and is being converted to condominiums.

It was listed on the National Register of Historic Places in 2007.
