= Transit (Frederick County) =

Public transit agency in Frederick County, Maryland

Transit Services of Frederick County
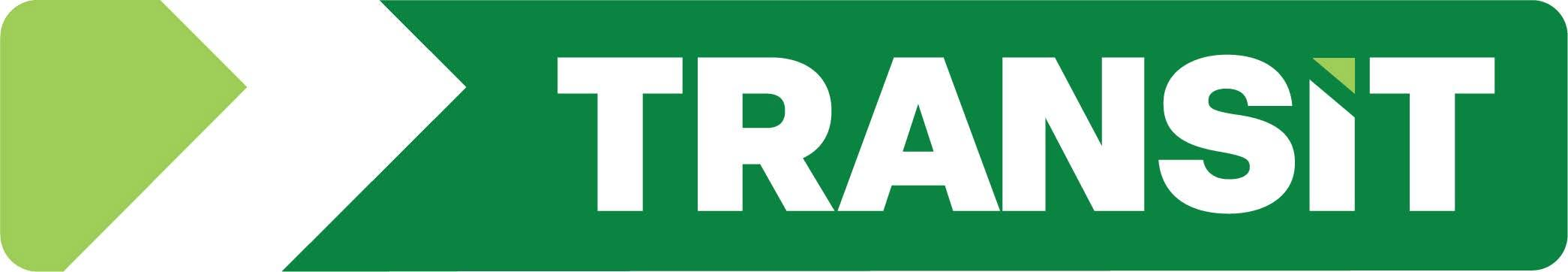
- Parent: Frederick County
- Headquarters: 1040 Rocky Springs Road
- Locale: Frederick, Maryland
- Service area: Frederick County
- Service type: bus service, paratransit, commuter services, travel training
- Routes: 16
- Fleet: 33 buses
- Website: Transit Services

Transit Services of Frederick County branded as Transit is a public transportation agency in Frederick County, Maryland, that is operated by the county government. The agency currently operates 10 Connector bus routes, mostly in the city of Frederick, 6 shuttles, and demand-response for seniors and other eligible persons. Transit provides connections to other public transportation services in the region, including the MTA Maryland's routes 204 and 515 commuter bus and MARC Train service. According to the agency's homepage, the service had approximately 928,650 riders in FY 2025.

Transit Services is the result of merging the former Trans-Serve Frederick County shuttles and the Frederick City Transit lines in 1992.

Connector bus routes operate weekdays with reduced Saturday services. The agency does not operate on Sundays or federal holidays. Most routes provide midday service (every 30 minutes) in addition to hourly service on weekdays.

== Fares ==
In April 2014, the fare for a one-way trip using Transit for the general public was $1.25 with a monthly pass costing $45.00. In June 2014, the one-way trip fare for the general public increased to $1.50. At the same time, the fare for TransIT Plus also increased.

If the bus needs to deviate from its normal route for a stop, an additional $1.50 is charged to the passenger and 24 hours heads up must be given. In March 2020, Transit became free to ride on all Connectors and Shuttles. It has remained free ever since.

== Routes ==
Transit Services routes are ten based, with the first digit designated to the part of the city/county the bus runs outbound. During peak hours, 4 routes run every half-hour. These buses are designated with a P after the route number denoting it is a peak hour, extra bus. Example, the number 50 bus may show as the 50P. In 2024, Transit Services discontinued using the "P" designation as the routes transitioned to efficient half-hour service throughout the weekday.

In the spring of 2024, the Route 40 connector was renamed the Golden Mile Connector to better reflect the service area. Then in the summer of 2025, the Route 50 Connector was renamed to Waverley via Prospect Boulevard and the Route 51 Connector was renamed to Waverley via 7th Street due to the relocation of the transfer hub from Boscov's/Frederick Towne Mall. In June 2026, Transit Services introduced the Route 15 Ballenger via Downtown Connector, which expanded more service in Ballenger Creek and Downtown Frederick. The route began service on July 6, 2026 alongside with the Route 10 Connector being modified to have better timed transfers and having hourly service between Waverley Drive and Kingsbrook Crossing.

Route number	Name	Major Destinations	Notes
10	Ballenger via Waverley	Frederick Towne Mall, Kingsbrook Crossing	
15	Ballenger via Downtown	Transit Center, Kingsbrook Crossing, Francis Scott Key Mall	
20	Francis Scott Key Mall Connector	Monocacy MARC station, Francis Scott Key Mall	
40	Golden Mile Connector	Golden Mile area	
50	Waverley via Prospect Boulevard	Frederick Towne Mall	
51	Waverley via 7th Street	Frederick Towne Mall	
60	Frederick Community College Connector via East Street	Frederick YMCA, Frederick Community College	
61	Frederick Community College Connector via Taney Ave	Frederick Community College	
65	Walkersville Connector	Walkersville, Monocacy Village	
80	North-West Connector	Frederick Community College, Frederick Towne Mall	
85	Route 85 Shuttle	Business and industrial parks of southern Frederick	
ET	Emmitsburg-Thurmont Shuttle	Emmitsburg, Thurmont, Frederick Transit Center	
BJ	Brunswick-Jefferson Shuttle	Brunswick, Jefferson, Knoxville, Frederick	
EF	East Frederick Shuttle	Frederick Fairgrounds, MVA	
MTM	Point of Rocks Meet-the-MARC Shuttle	Point of Rocks, Mt. Zion Road park and ride, Frederick Transit Center	
MTM	Walkersville Meet-the-MARC Shuttle	Walkersville, Waterside, Frederick Transit Center	
NF	North Frederick Shuttle	Frederick Transit Center, Rt. 26 Area	

== Former Logo ==
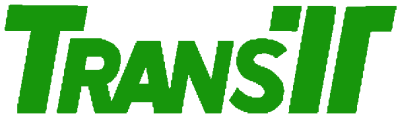
Former TransIT logo

From 1992 until 2025, Transit Services has used their simple green TransIT logo on buses and company brand.

== Fleet ==
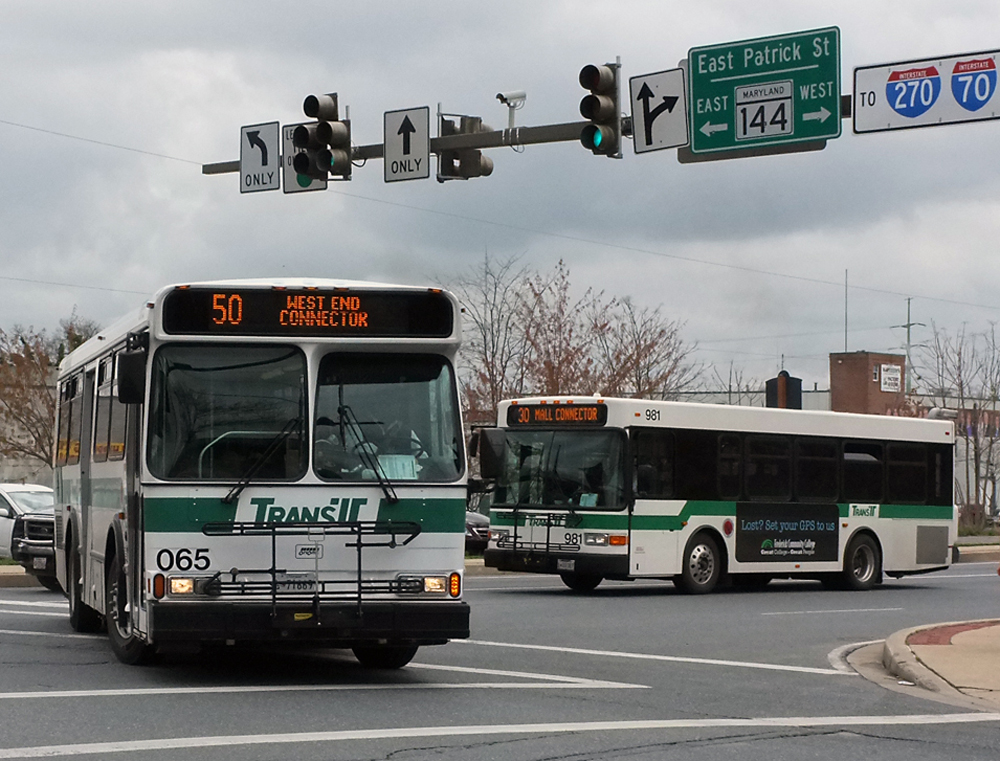
Two TransIT buses (Orion V #065 and Gillig Low Floor #981) heading toward the square, downtown in the fall 2012.

Transit currently has a fleet composing of full length buses for their connector routes as well as cut-away para transit vehicles used for shuttles and TransIT+ services. Fleet subsets are replaced and returned on average every 14 years, the maximum service life for a bus permitted by Maryland law. There are 24 buses and 35 para-transit cut-away buses on the active fleet, along with several minivans, and passenger cars used for various TransIT special needs services.

=== Current fleet ===
Year	Image	Make	Model	Fleet series
2010		Gillig	Low Floor 29'	981-986
2011		Gillig	Low Floor 35' HEV	157-158
2009-2010		New Flyer	DE40LFR	40225-40227
2012		New Flyer	XDE40	40228
2018-2024		ENC	E-Z Rider II 32'	2018: 956-958, 122-124 2024: 39652, 39653, 39740
2018		Champion	Frieghtliner M2	959
2020		BYD	K7M 30'	364-367
2025		Gillig	Low Floor 35' CNG	40389-40390, 40003-40004

=== Former fleet ===
The original Frederick City Transit bus system utilized several former Frederick County Public School buses fitted with rear exit doors and painted white.

Year	Image	Manufacturer	Model	Fleet series	Total
1976		Superior	Pioneer 40	101–102	2
1981		Transportation Manufacturing Corporation	Citycruiser	200–203	3
1987		Orion	Orion I	204	1
1994		Orion	Orion V	322–325	4
1997		Champion Bus Incorporated	Breadbox	246–248	3
1998		Champion Bus Incorporated	Breadbox	872–874	3
2002		Thomas Dennis	SLF-230	917–921	5
2003		Orion	Orion V	922–928	7
2004		Orion	Orion V	060–066	7
2016		Complete Coach Works/Gillig	Advantage Low Floor ZEPS	779–783	5

== See also ==
- Maryland Transit Administration
- Washington Metropolitan Area Transit Authority
