= Hess Shoe Store =

Defunct Maryland area shoe store

- Formerly: N. Hess' Sons
- Type: Private company
- Industry: Retail
- Founded: 1872
- Defunct: 1999
- Fate: Bankruptcy
- Headquarters: Baltimore, Maryland, United States
- Area served: Maryland
- Products: Shoes

N. Hess' Sons was a Baltimore, Maryland area shoe store founded in 1872. Privately held, it was acquired from the founding family by a German company in the late 1970s. At its peak in 1989 it had 32 stores, shrinking to 23 stores in 1994 in a conscious effort to achieve economies of scale after a bankruptcy and reorganization. At its demise in 1999 it had 11 stores throughout the Baltimore region.

Its Edmondson Village store (Hess Monkey Town) adjoined a children's barber shop which featured live monkeys.

The 1948 building that housed its flagship store on York Rd. is part of the Hochschild, Kohn Belvedere and Hess Shoes Historic district.
