= Hochschild Kohn's =

American department store chain

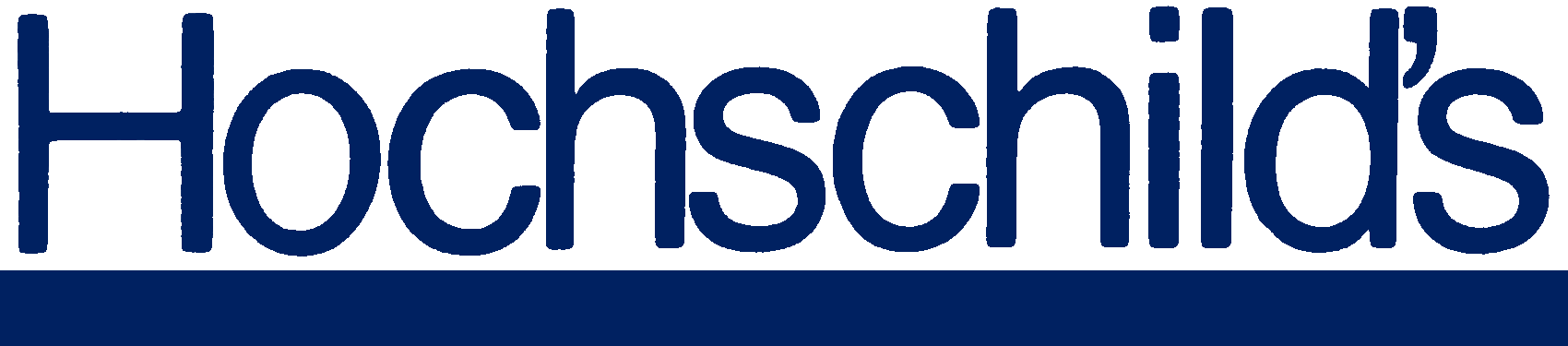
- Industry: Retail
- Founded: 1897
- Defunct: 1984
- Fate: Bankruptcy
- Headquarters: Baltimore, Maryland
- Key people: Max Hochschild, Benno Kohn, Louis B. Kohn, founders
- Products: General merchandise

Hochschild Kohn's, also known as Hochschild-Kohn or simply Hochschild's, was a 20th-century American department store chain based in Baltimore, Maryland. It was started in 1897 as a partnership between Max Hochschild, Benno Kohn, and his brother Louis B. Kohn. Hochschild-Kohn & Company opened that year with a downtown-Baltimore store on the northwest corner of Howard and Lexington Streets. The chain closed in 1984.

== History ==
Max Hochschild was a Jewish immigrant from Hesse, Germany, while Benno and Louis B. Kohn were the American-born sons of Jewish parents who immigrated from Bavaria. The company prospered and in 1912 purchased a building at 208 N. Howard Street. When incorporated in 1922, Hochschild-Kohn was Baltimore's largest department store. Also in 1922, the company started the Belvedere brand record label. Space needs led to the purchase of most of the block bounded by Howard, Franklin, Park, and Centre Streets in 1923 in anticipation of building a new, more modern and spacious store, but financial difficulties and Max Hochschild's retirement as president led to the plan's abandonment. (The building now standing at the Howard and Lexington location echoes some of the original building's semi-circular arched door and window profiles.)

Benno Kohn died in 1929. Management then consisted of Irving Kohn (Louis' son) president; Walter Sondheim and Walter Kohn, vice-presidents. Although financed by corporate stock, Hochschild-Kohn was still run as a partnership. At that time plans for a new building at Howard and Franklin Streets were abandoned, and the Lexington Street building was leased, improved, and connected to the Howard and Lexington Street property.

During the Great Depression, Hochschild-Kohn lost more in sales percentages than the aggregate sales lost by other Baltimore department stores. Sales were down almost fifty percent from 1930 in the Depression's worst year. Management also suffered from discord between Irving and Walter Kohn, who retired in 1935. Management then consisted of Irving Kohn, Walter Sondheim, and Martin Kohn. After illness caused Walter Sondheim to be less active in 1943, and Irving Kohn's death in 1945, Martin B. Kohn became president of the store. Louis Kohn II and Walter Sondheim Jr. were his vice-presidents.

Martin B. Kohn pioneered the suburban expansion of downtown department stores with the opening of Hochschild-Kohn's Edmondson Village store in 1947. Later expansion included stores at York Road and Belvedere Avenue in northern Baltimore in 1948, known as the Hochschild, Kohn Belvedere store, and at Harundale Mall south of the city. Other locations included Security Square Mall in Woodlawn and The Mall in Columbia in Columbia.

In 1966 Warren Buffett and Charlie Munger became investors.

In December 1969 Supermarkets General purchased Hochschild's and did not divulge its purchase price. Under Supermarkets General, Hochschild Kohn adopted a "compete-or-get-trampled-on" outlook. The company's York, Pennsylvania store opened on September 27, 1968, followed by its large The Mall in Columbia location on August 2, 1971. Chairman Louis B. Kohn II called the Columbia store's opening, "A start of a new era for Hochschild's." Other later locations included Freestate Mall in Bowie, Maryland. The Bowie location was the last Hochschild's to open. By 1984, Supermarket's General had closed Hochschild's as a chain, and many Hochschild-Kohn stores were purchased by Hutzler's later that year. These stores included locations such as Harundale Mall and Security Square Mall, which at the time was the highest volume store for Hochschild's.

The Hochschild, Kohn Belvedere store was listed on the National Register of Historic Places in 2003.
