= Glen Burnie, Maryland =

- Census-designated place
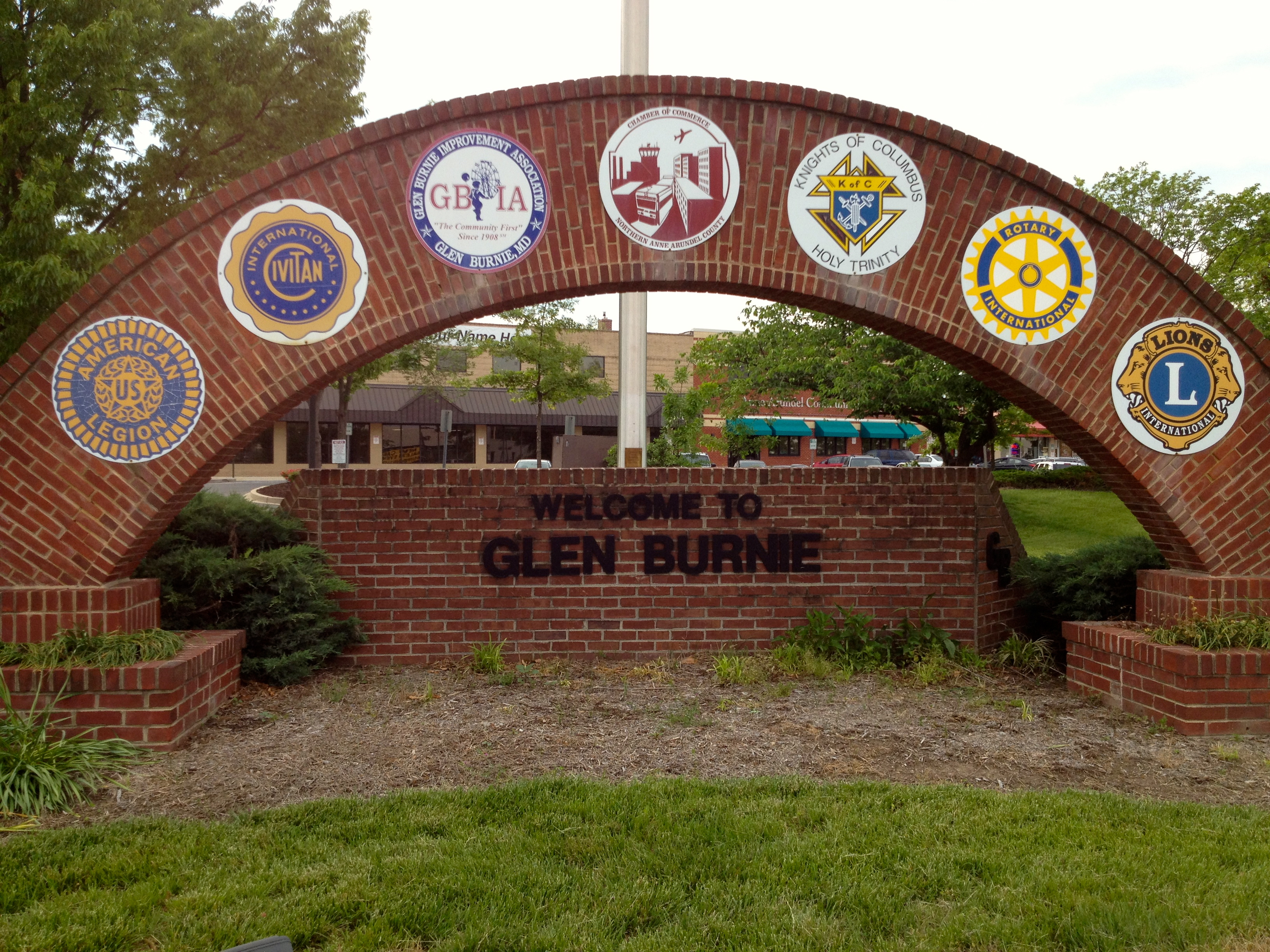
- Nickname: "Chrome City"
- Location of Glen Burnie, Maryland
- Coordinates: 39°9′36″N 76°36′38″W
- Country: United States
- State: Maryland
- County: Anne Arundel
- Founded: 1812

Area
  - Total: 18.02 sq mi (46.67 km^{2})
  - Land: 17.31 sq mi (44.84 km^{2})
  - Water: 0.71 sq mi (1.84 km^{2})
- Elevation: 52 ft (16 m)

Population (2020)
  - Total: 72,891
  - Density: 4,210.5/sq mi (1,625.69/km^{2})
- Time zone: UTC−5 (Eastern (EST))
  - Summer (DST): UTC−4 (EDT)
- ZIP codes: 21060-21062
- Area codes: 410, 443, and 667
- FIPS code: 24-32650
- GNIS feature ID: 0590311

Glen Burnie is an unincorporated town and census-designated place (CDP) in Anne Arundel County, Maryland, United States. It is a suburb of Baltimore. The population was 72,891 at the 2020 census.

== History ==
In 1812, Elias Glenn, a district attorney, established a country estate south of Baltimore. He named his property "Glennsburne". The name was changed to "Glennsbourne Farm", and eventually "Glenburnie", as the property was passed through Glenn's descendants. Records also show the name as "Tracey's Station" and "Myrtle", after local postmaster Samuel Sewell Tracey and one of Tracey's boarders, before the final decision was made.

In 1854, William Wilkins Glenn, Elias Glenn's grandson, incorporated the Curtis Creek Mining, Furnace and Manufacturing Company into his family's property. The business flourished during the 19th century, and with it came several thousand acres of land in northern Anne Arundel County.

Upon the death of William Wilkins Glenn, his son, brother and nephew began to manage the family's business affairs, and Glenburnie became an official state subdivision in 1888. The Glenn family contracted George T. Melvin and Henry S. Mancha to lay out and promote the town. It would not be until 1930 that postmaster Louis J. DeAlba decided two words were better than one, and gave the town a final name change to the current Glen Burnie.

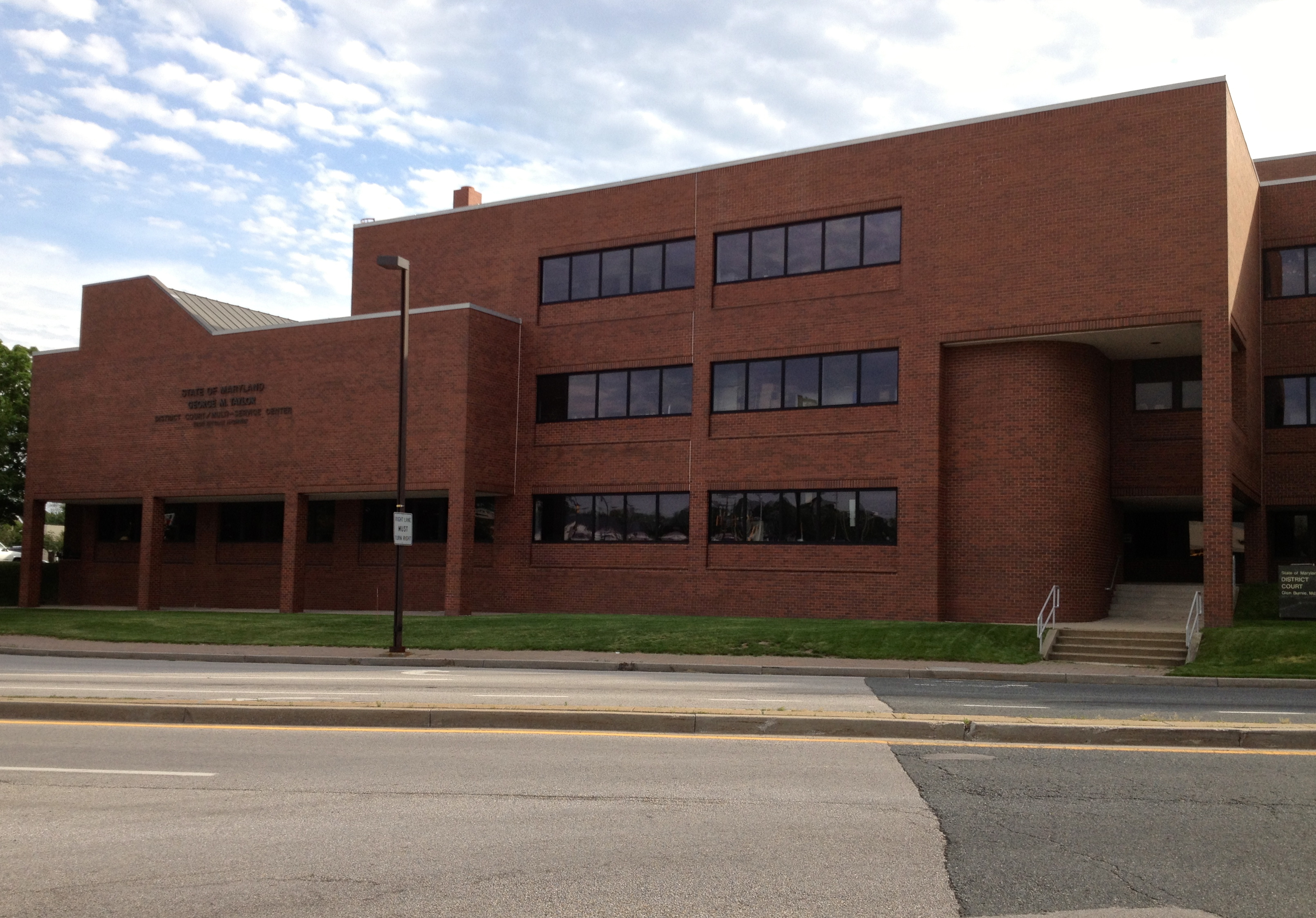
Courthouse, Glen Burnie

Among the earliest Glen Burnie schools was First Avenue Elementary, built in 1899. The oldest area church is St. Alban's Episcopal, which was built in 1904, with many of its bricks dating back to Marley Chapel, an early Maryland parish from the 1730s. Crain Highway, one of Glen Burnie's main thoroughfares (named after Robert Crain), opened in 1927 and Ritchie Highway (Maryland Route 2, named for ex-Governor Albert C. Ritchie) followed in 1939. Ritchie Highway carried nearly all Baltimore-area traffic headed for Annapolis and the Chesapeake Bay Bridge until an alternate bypass road, Interstate 97, opened in the 1980s.

Until 1950 the Baltimore and Annapolis Railroad provided passenger and freight service through Glen Burnie from Annapolis to Baltimore; passenger service ended in February 1950 due to increased competition from buses and private automobiles, but freight service continued until Hurricane Agnes did so much damage to a trestle crossing the Severn River in Annapolis that the trestle was condemned for use by trains by the Army Corps of Engineers in the late 1960s. (The trestle remained as a haven for fishermen and crabbers until it was dismantled.) North Glen Burnie is now served by the Baltimore Light Rail system's Cromwell/Glen Burnie station.

Schools and churches were built in the ensuing decades, and construction was completed on Harundale Mall, the first enclosed shopping center east of the Mississippi River, in 1958. It was one of the first shopping centers to be called a "mall" and was developed by James W. Rouse of the Rouse Company (which also developed nearby Columbia, Maryland). The mall was developed in a joint effort with a local real estate developer, Charles Steffey. The originally planned location was not on Ritchie Highway but on Crain Highway (the main arterial for Glen Burnie). Charlie Steffey and Jim Rouse negotiated unsuccessfully with the "city fathers" of Glen Burnie, offering to regenerate the (then failing) center of town with their revolutionary concept. The "sticking point" was that the intersection of Crain Highway and Quarterfield Road (the proposed location) habitually flooded in even nominal rainstorms, to the point of cars being up to their doors in the river that ensued.

The "city fathers" decided that the advantage of having the "mall" there was overshadowed by the cost of fixing the storm water situation and declined. As a result, Glen Burnie Mall followed in 1962. Marley Station, another large shopping center, opened in February 1987. The Maryland Motor Vehicle Administration office building employs many people in town. In the 1970s, developers tried to make Glen Burnie more urban by building and funding new projects, projects like Empire Towers in 1974, or Crain Towers in 1990, then with the addition of an Anne Arundel Community College branch in the town center. In 1965, North Arundel Hospital opened as a community hospital, but as it was constantly overflowed with patients, the University of Maryland Medical System bought the hospital in 2000 and renovated it to accommodate more patients and equipment.

== Geography ==
Glen Burnie is a suburb of Baltimore. It is located at 39°9′36″N 76°36′38″W (39.159982, −76.610588). The intersection of Central Avenue and Crain Highway forms the boundaries of the NW, SW, NE & SE postal quadrants in the community's center.

According to the United States Census Bureau, the CDP has a total area of 18.0 square miles (46.7 km^{2}), of which 17.3 square miles (44.9 km^{2}) is land and 0.69 square miles (1.8 km^{2}), or 3.95%, is water.

=== Climate ===
The climate in this area is characterized by hot, humid summers and generally mild to cool winters. According to the Köppen Climate Classification system, Glen Burnie has a humid subtropical climate, abbreviated "Cfa" on climate maps.

Climate data for Baltimore/Washington International Airport (1981−2010 normals, extremes 1950−present)
Month	Jan	Feb	Mar	Apr	May	Jun	Jul	Aug	Sep	Oct	Nov	Dec	Year
Record high °F (°C)	75 (24)	79 (26)	89 (32)	94 (34)	98 (37)	103 (39)	106 (41)	105 (41)	100 (38)	98 (37)	86 (30)	77 (25)	106 (41)
Mean maximum °F (°C)	63.5 (17.5)	66.2 (19.0)	76.4 (24.7)	85.1 (29.5)	90.1 (32.3)	95.2 (35.1)	97.3 (36.3)	95.9 (35.5)	90.8 (32.7)	82.9 (28.3)	74.5 (23.6)	65.6 (18.7)	98.6 (37.0)
Mean daily maximum °F (°C)	41.4 (5.2)	44.9 (7.2)	53.6 (12.0)	64.6 (18.1)	73.9 (23.3)	83.0 (28.3)	87.2 (30.7)	85.1 (29.5)	77.9 (25.5)	66.8 (19.3)	56.4 (13.6)	45.3 (7.4)	65.1 (18.4)
Mean daily minimum °F (°C)	24.4 (−4.2)	26.6 (−3.0)	33.5 (0.8)	42.7 (5.9)	52.0 (11.1)	61.9 (16.6)	66.8 (19.3)	65.2 (18.4)	57.6 (14.2)	45.4 (7.4)	36.5 (2.5)	28.1 (−2.2)	45.1 (7.3)
Mean minimum °F (°C)	7.6 (−13.6)	11.9 (−11.2)	18.9 (−7.3)	29.1 (−1.6)	38.6 (3.7)	49.4 (9.7)	56.4 (13.6)	54.4 (12.4)	43.7 (6.5)	32.0 (0.0)	23.0 (−5.0)	13.2 (−10.4)	4.6 (−15.2)
Record low °F (°C)	−7 (−22)	−3 (−19)	4 (−16)	20 (−7)	32 (0)	40 (4)	50 (10)	45 (7)	35 (2)	25 (−4)	13 (−11)	0 (−18)	−7 (−22)
Average precipitation inches (mm)	3.05 (77)	2.90 (74)	3.90 (99)	3.19 (81)	3.99 (101)	3.46 (88)	4.07 (103)	3.29 (84)	4.03 (102)	3.33 (85)	3.30 (84)	3.37 (86)	41.88 (1,064)
Average snowfall inches (cm)	6.8 (17)	8.0 (20)	1.9 (4.8)	trace	0 (0)	0 (0)	0 (0)	0 (0)	0 (0)	0 (0)	0.4 (1.0)	3.0 (7.6)	20.1 (51)
Average precipitation days (≥ 0.01 in)	10.2	8.9	10.4	10.8	11.4	10.6	10.0	8.6	8.5	8.2	8.7	9.9	116.2
Average snowy days (≥ 0.1 in)	3.5	2.8	1.1	0.1	0	0	0	0	0	0	0.3	1.7	9.5
Average relative humidity (%)	63.2	61.3	59.2	58.9	66.1	68.4	69.1	71.1	71.3	69.5	66.5	65.5	65.8
Average dew point °F (°C)	19.9 (−6.7)	21.6 (−5.8)	28.9 (−1.7)	37.6 (3.1)	50.4 (10.2)	60.1 (15.6)	64.6 (18.1)	64.0 (17.8)	57.6 (14.2)	45.5 (7.5)	35.2 (1.8)	25.3 (−3.7)	42.6 (5.9)
Mean monthly sunshine hours	155.4	164.0	215.0	230.7	254.5	277.3	290.1	264.4	221.8	205.5	158.5	144.5	2,581.7
Percentage possible sunshine	51	54	58	58	57	62	64	62	59	59	52	49	58
Source: NOAA (relative humidity, dew point and sun 1961–1990)

== Demographics ==
Historical population
Census	Pop.	Note	%±
2000	38,922		—
2010	67,639		73.8%
2020	72,891		7.8%
U.S. Decennial Census

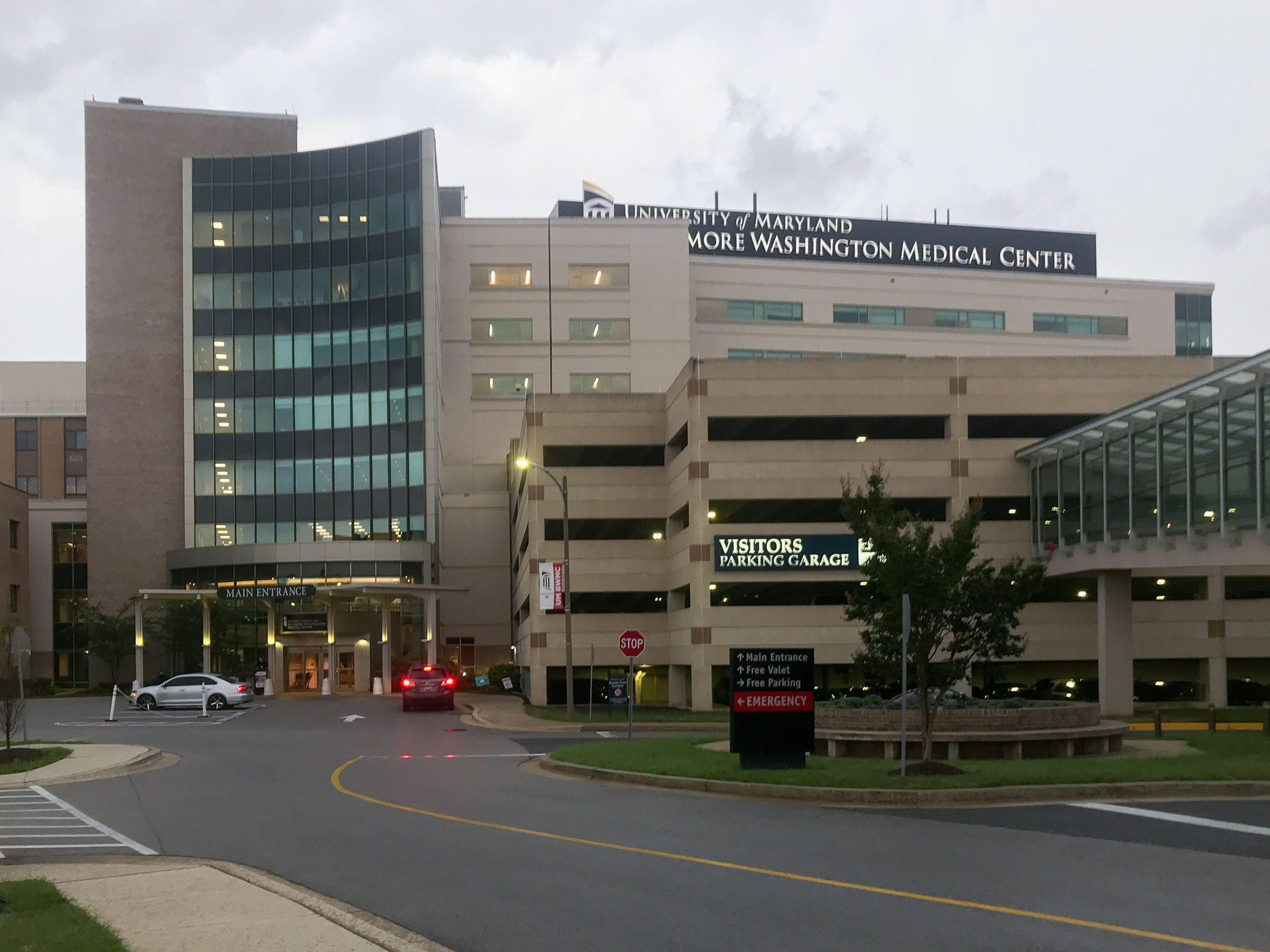
University of Maryland Baltimore Washington Medical Center

=== 2020 census ===
As of the 2020 census, Glen Burnie had a population of 72,891. The median age was 36.9 years. 21.6% of residents were under the age of 18 and 13.8% of residents were 65 years of age or older. For every 100 females there were 94.8 males, and for every 100 females age 18 and over there were 91.8 males age 18 and over.

100.0% of residents lived in urban areas, while 0.0% lived in rural areas.

There were 28,216 households in Glen Burnie, of which 30.6% had children under the age of 18 living in them. Of all households, 39.7% were married-couple households, 20.4% were households with a male householder and no spouse or partner present, and 31.7% were households with a female householder and no spouse or partner present. About 28.3% of all households were made up of individuals and 9.5% had someone living alone who was 65 years of age or older.

There were 29,631 housing units, of which 4.8% were vacant. The homeowner vacancy rate was 1.4% and the rental vacancy rate was 6.1%.

Racial composition as of the 2020 census
Race	Number	Percent
White	38,201	52.4%
Black or African American	19,144	26.3%
American Indian and Alaska Native	399	0.5%
Asian	3,214	4.4%
Native Hawaiian and Other Pacific Islander	73	0.1%
Some other race	5,408	7.4%
Two or more races	6,452	8.9%
Hispanic or Latino (of any race)	9,168	12.6%

Among residents identifying with more than one race, 446 reported three races, 76 reported four races, and 4 reported five races; each subgroup represented less than one percent of the population.

=== 2000 census ===
As of the 2000 census, there were 38,922 people, 15,210 households, and 9,977 families residing in the CDP. The population density was 3,182.1 inhabitants per square mile (1,228.6/km^{2}). There were 15,902 housing units at an average density of 1,300.1 per square mile (502.0/km^{2}). The racial makeup of the CDP was 81.11% White, 13.52% Black, 0.35% Native American, 2.40% Asian, 0.07% Pacific Islander, 0.78% from other races, and 1.78% from two or more races. Hispanic or Latino of any race were 2.46% of the population.

There were 15,210 households, out of which 29.6% had children under the age of 18 living with them, 47.1% were married couples living together, 13.1% had a female householder with no husband present, and 34.4% were non-families. 27.2% of all households were made up of individuals, and 9.3% had someone living alone who was 65 years of age or older. The average household size was 2.53 and the average family size was 3.07.

In the CDP, the population was spread out, with 23.7% under the age of 18, 9.0% from 18 to 24, 32.3% from 25 to 44, 22.1% from 45 to 64, and 12.9% who were 65 years of age or older. The median age was 36 years. For every 100 females, there were 94.7 males. For every 100 females age 18 and over, there were 92.2 males.

The median income for a household in the CDP was $45,281, and the median income for a family was $51,845. Males had a median income of $35,957 versus $27,078 for females. The per capita income for the CDP was $20,170. About 5.9% of families and 7.7% of the population were below the poverty line, including 10.2% of those under age 18 and 9.1% of those age 65 or over.

== Education ==
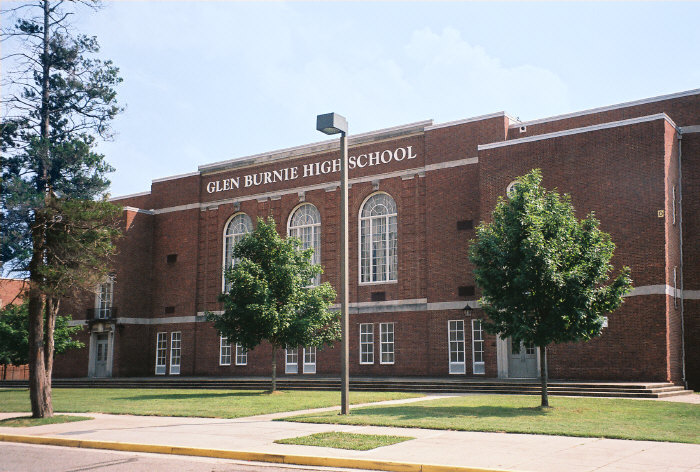
Glen Burnie High School

The following public schools are in Glen Burnie or serve students who reside in Glen Burnie:

- Glen Burnie High School
- Marley Elementary
- Marley Middle
- Glendale Elementary
- Freetown Elementary
- Monarch Academy
- Point Pleasant Elementary
- Solley Elementary
- Corkran Middle
- George T. Cromwell Elementary
- Glen Burnie Park Elementary
- North County High School
- North Glen Elementary
- Oakwood Elementary
- Woodside Elementary
- Old Mill High School
- Old Mill Middle School South
- Old Mill Middle School North
- Richard Henry Lee Elementary
- Rippling Woods Elementary
- Southgate Elementary
- Severn Run High School
- Northeast Middle School
- Northeast High School

The private Monsignor Slade Catholic School operates in the community. Glen Burnie is also home to a campus of Anne Arundel Community College.

== Transportation ==
=== Aviation ===
Baltimore/Washington International Airport is directly adjacent to the west of Glen Burnie, providing the city access to domestic and international flights.

=== Public transit ===
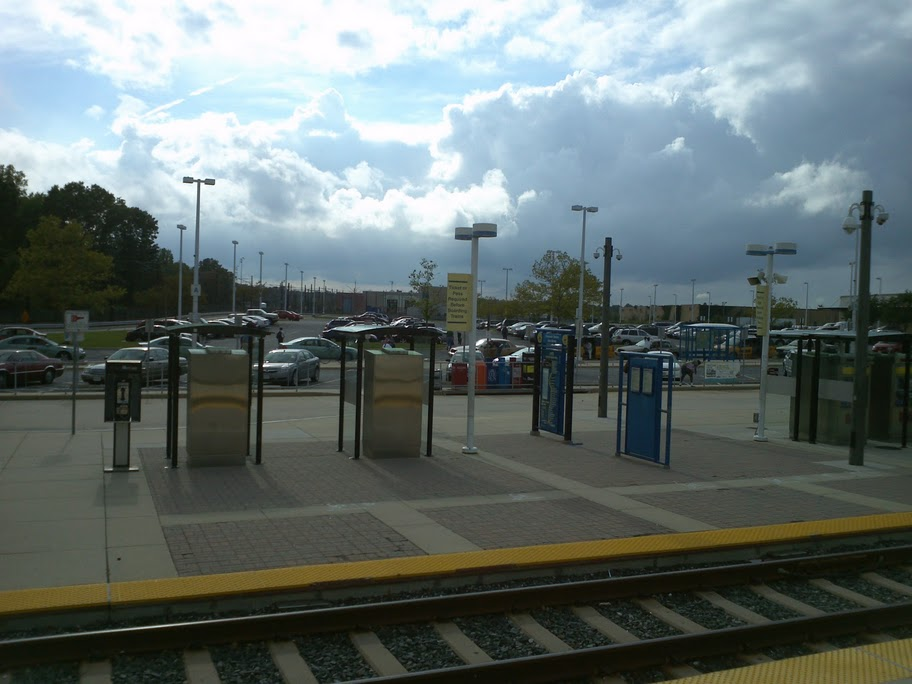
Glen Burnie station

As the southern terminus of the Cromwell Branch of the Baltimore Light Rail, Glen Burnie is home to two light rail stops, Ferndale and Glen Burnie. Glen Burnie station, located at the intersection of Baltimore-Annapolis Boulevard and Dorsey Road, is equipped with a free park-and-ride for commuters, as well as a bus connection to MTA Route 14 and bike connection to the Baltimore & Annapolis Trail.

BWI Rail Station located in nearby Linthicum provides regional rail service to Glen Burnie via the MARC Penn Line and Amtrak.

=== Roads ===
The Glen Burnie area is served by the following major roadways:

- MD 2 Governor Ritchie Highway: Glen Burnie's main commercial boulevard running north–south.
- MD 3 Robert Crain Highway: Glen Burnie's main street stemming off of MD 2 towards New Cut Road and Veterans Highway.
- MD 10 Arundel Expressway: A by-pass expressway running north–south from the Baltimore Beltway to Ritchie Highway in Pasadena.
- MD 100 Paul T, Pitcher Memorial Highway: Another expressway running east–west connecting Glen Burnie to Ellicott City and Gibson Island.
- I-97 Glen Burnie Bypass: A major north–south interstate highway connecting Glen Burnie to Baltimore and Annapolis.
- I-695 Baltimore Beltway: Located in north Glen Burnie, the Baltimore Beltway provides circumferential travel throughout Greater Baltimore.
- Airport Loop A set of highways forming a loop around BWI Thurgood Marshall Airport.

== Notable people ==
- Jack Andraka, student, inventor
- Jacob M. Appel, author
- Kevin Barnes, Washington Redskins player
- Hunt Block, actor
- Toni Braxton, singer
- John A. Cade, former state senator
- Steve Clevenger, Major League baseball player
- Bill Currier, football player
- Bob Eberly, big band singer, died in Glen Burnie
- Elwood Edwards, voice of America Online greetings (“Welcome. You’ve got mail”), born in Glen Burnie
- James Ellsworth, professional wrestler
- Mark E. Ferguson III, Admiral, US Navy, Vice Chief of Naval Operations
- Mary Leona Gage, Miss Maryland USA 1957, Miss USA 1957
- Rudy Gay, basketball player for the Sacramento Kings
- Duane Gill ("Gillberg"), professional wrestler and a former WWF Light Heavyweight Champion
- Terry R. Gilleland, Jr., elected official
- Clayton Greene, Jr., jurist, born in Glen Burnie
- Kevin Levrone, IFBB champion bodybuilder
- C. Edward Middlebrooks, politician
- Tony Saunders, Major League Baseball pitcher 1997-1999
- Montel Williams, television and radio talk-show host

== See also ==
- Baltimore & Annapolis Trail
- Glen Burnie High School - football field is featured in the film The Replacements
- Harundale Mall
- Marley Station
