= TownMall of Westminster =

Shopping mall in Carroll County, Maryland, U.S.

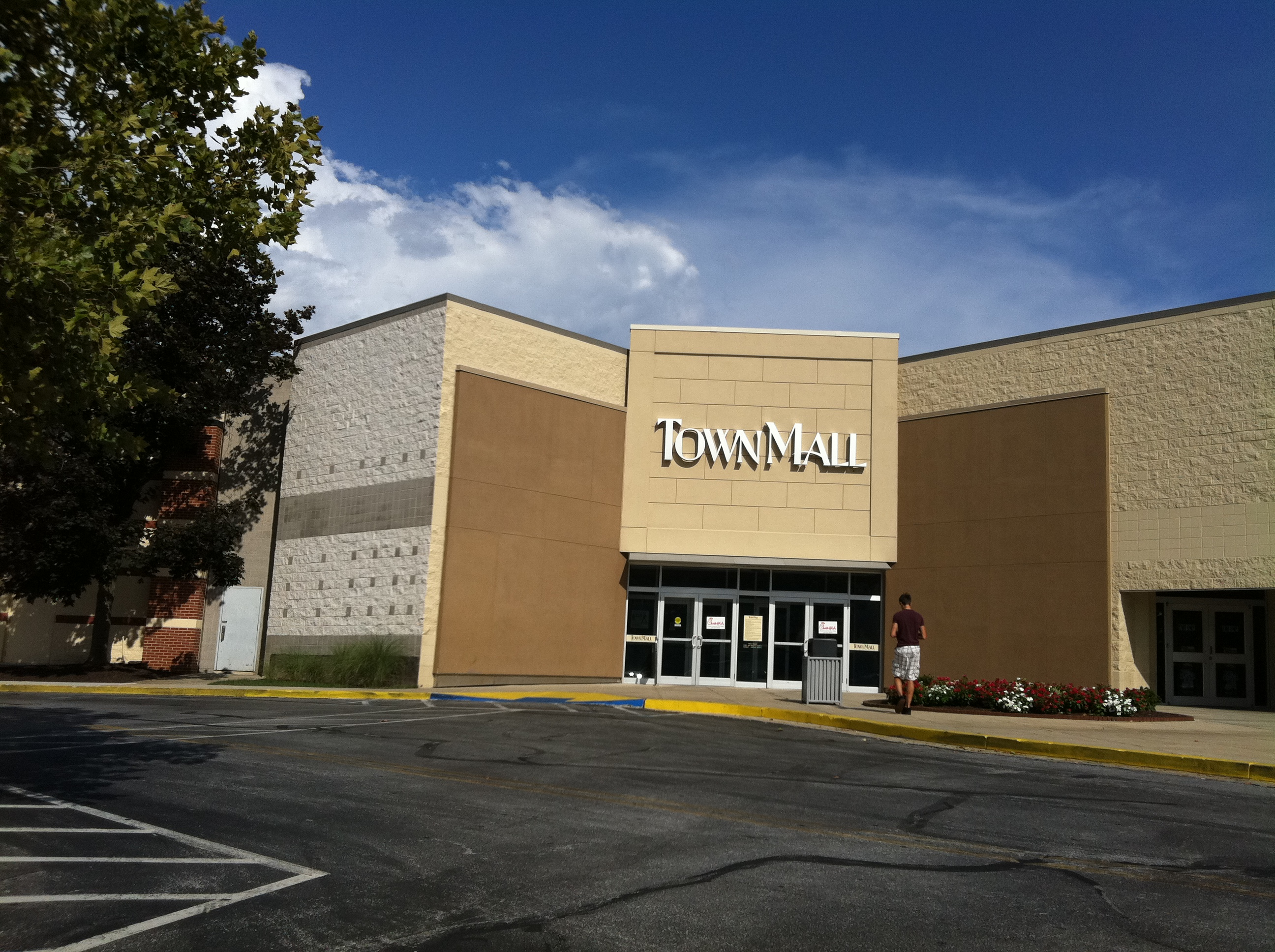
- Main entrance (August 2011)
- Location: Westminster, Maryland, U.S.
- Coordinates: 39°34′43″N 76°58′59″W
- Address: 400 N. Center Street, 21157
- Opened: March 4, 1987; 39 years ago
- Developer: Shopco Advisory Group
- Manager: The Woodmont Company
- Owner: Westminster Mall LLC
- Num. of stores: 75
- Num. of anchor tenants: 4 (3 open, 1 vacant)
- Floor area: 629,097 square feet (58,445.0 m^{2})
- Floors: 1 (2 in Boscov's)
- Parking: 2,708 spaces
- Public transit: Carroll Transit System bus: Eldersburg to Westminster, Taneytown to Westminster, Westminster TrailBlazer
- Website: townmallofwestminster.com

TownMall of Westminster, formerly Cranberry Mall, is a shopping mall located in Westminster, Maryland, United States on Maryland Route 140, 30 miles northwest of Baltimore. Owned by Westminster Mall LLC, and managed by The Woodmont Company. The mall features more than 20 stores, including a food court and Movie Theater. Belk, Boscov's, Dick's Sporting Goods, and RC Theaters are the mall's anchors. It's the only enclosed regional shopping center in Carroll County.

== History ==
The mall opened in 1987 as "Cranberry Mall". The original anchors were Leggett (now Belk), Caldor, Montgomery Ward (now Boscov's) and Sears, which opened on a site originally planned for Hutzler's before that chain went bankrupt. Montgomery Ward opened in 1990. After closing in 2001, Montgomery Ward became Boscov's, while Caldor closed in 1999 and later became the first Steve & Barry's store in Maryland. After this store closed, the space was split in 2010 between Dick's Sporting Goods, Gold's Gym and Paradise of Fun (now Fun and Fit Factory). It is the only mall to have both northeastern chain Boscov's and southern chain Belk together in the same mall. The Boscov's store has the only escalators in Carroll County.

On October 7, 2011, a man was stabbed in the mall outside the movie theater, he was taken to the University of Maryland Shock Trauma Center in Baltimore.

As of December 2015, there have been a number of closings, including Shenk&Title, The Dress Barn, Super Buffet, Radio Shack, Bon Worth, Hurricane Racing, Deb, Things Remembered, KFC, and a coffee shop that had changed names a few times over the past two years Mugshots, Black and White, Coffee Shop. Many of the closed store's spaces remain vacant or house temporary seasonal clientele.

On June 23, 2017, Gold's Gym announced it would be closing as a result of an inability of not coming to terms of leasing. Later in the year, THE GYM opened up in that space.

In early December 2017, it was announced that the mall had been sold to Westminster Mall, LLC.

On October 15, 2018, it was announced the Sears store would be closing as part of a plan to close 142 stores nationwide as a result of filing for Chapter 11 bankruptcy. The store closed on January 6, 2019.

In 2021, Books-a-Million, FYE, and Yankee Candle are among the longtime tenants to close their doors.
