= Carroll Transit System =

Mass transportation provider in Maryland, US

- Headquarters: 1300 Old Meadow Branch Road
- Locale: Westminster, Maryland
- Service area: Carroll County, Maryland
- Service type: bus service, paratransit
- Routes: 6 routes (formerly 7)
- Website: https://www.carrollcountymd.gov/government/directory/public-works/carroll-transit-system/

Carroll Transit System (CTS) is the primary provider of mass transportation in Carroll County, Maryland. The agency operates 6 bus routes from Monday through Friday and once ran an additional route on Saturdays. Approximately 600 people use the service each day. The Saturday route was discontinued in October 2022 due to low ridership.

== Route list ==
- Westminster (Purple)
- Westminster (Black)
- Taneytown (Green)
- South Carroll (Red)
- Eldersburg (Blue)
- North Carroll (Orange)
- Westminster Saturday
- Eldersburg Monday
