= Hochschild, Kohn Belvedere and Hess Shoes =

Historic district in Maryland, United States

- U.S. National Register of Historic Places
- U.S. Historic district
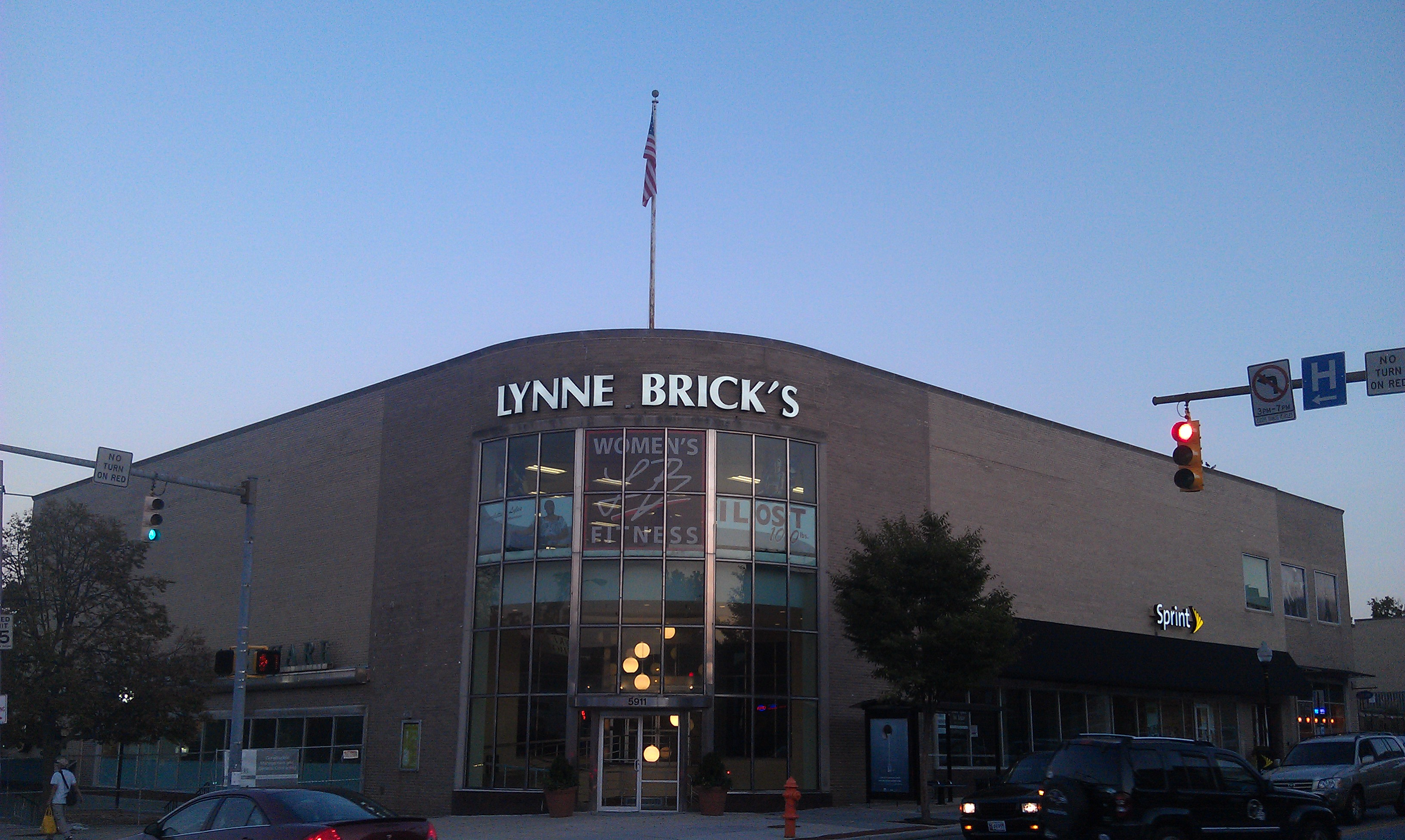
- Hochschild, Kohn Belvedere Store, September 2012

- Location within Baltimore Location within Maryland Location within the United States
- Location: 5911 York Rd. and 510 Belvedere Ave., Baltimore, Maryland
- Coordinates: 39°21′57″N 76°36′35″W
- Area: less than one acre
- Built: 1946
- Architect: Edmunds, James R. Jr.; Tyler, Ketcham & Myers
- Architectural style: Modern Movement
- NRHP reference No.: 03001296
- Added to NRHP: December 18, 2003

Hochschild, Kohn Belvedere and Hess Shoes is a national historic district consisting of a combined department store and shoe store building located at Baltimore, Maryland, United States. It consists of the 45,000-square-foot (4,200 m^{2}) two-story plus basement, Hochschild, Kohn Belvedere department store (constructed 1946–1948) and 1948 Hess Shoes store across the street. The structures comprise the modern-style core of a commercial development at York Road and Belvedere Avenue. The department store features a rounded corner with a glazed curtain wall facing the prominent intersection.

Hochschild, Kohn Belvedere and Hess Shoes was listed on the National Register of Historic Places in 2003.
