= Francis Scott Key Mall =

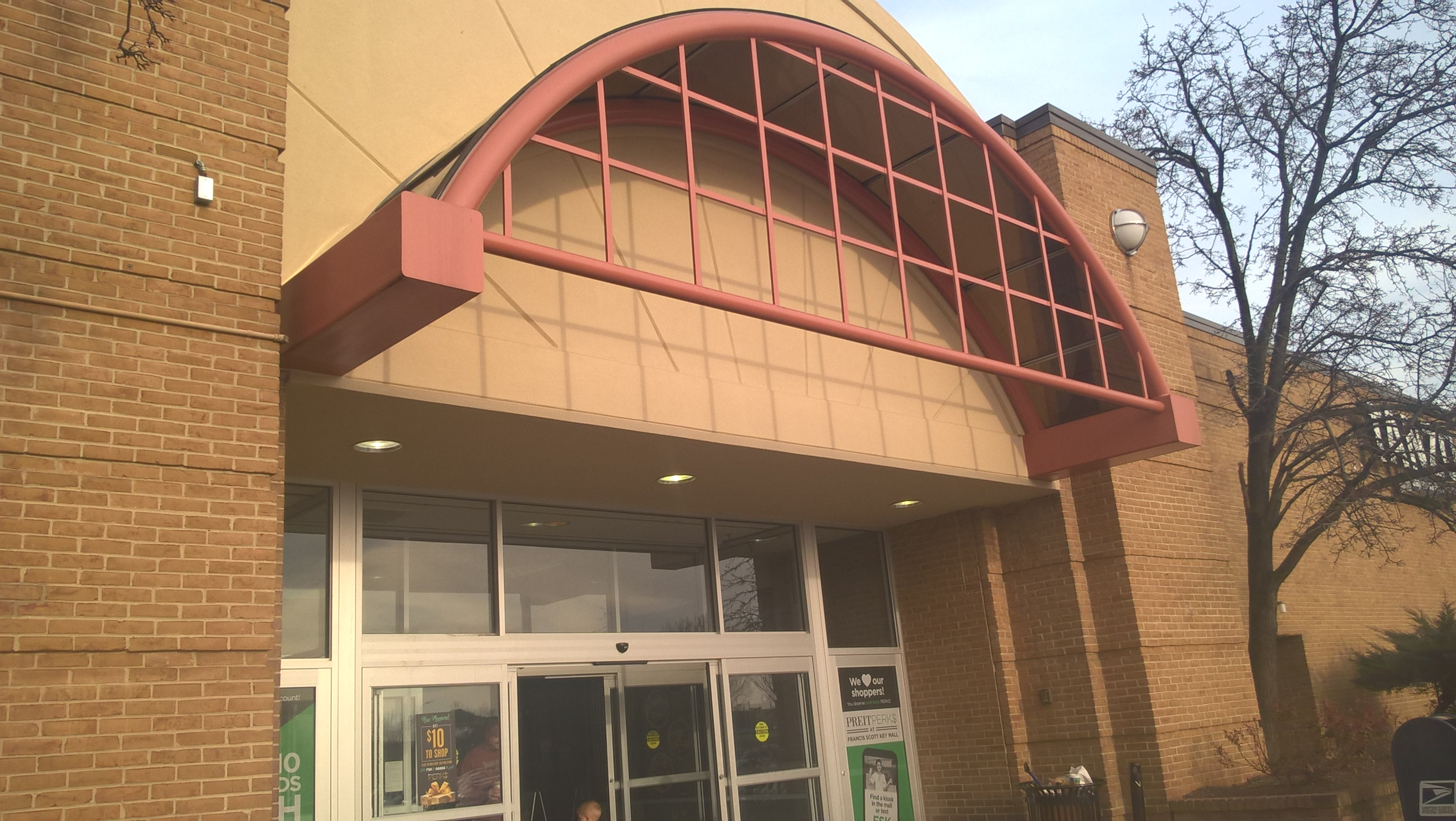
- Exterior view of Francis Scott Key Mall, December 2018
- Location: Frederick, Maryland, United States
- Coordinates: 39°22′58″N 77°24′21″W
- Address: 5500 Buckeystown Pike
- Opened: 1978
- Developer: Crown American
- Manager: PREIT
- Owner: PREIT
- Num. of stores: 100
- Num. of anchor tenants: 7 (1 vacant, 1 pending)
- Floor area: 755,000 sq ft (70,100 m^{2})
- Floors: 1 (staff mezzanine in JCPenney)
- Public transit: TransIT bus: 10, 20

Francis Scott Key Mall is an enclosed shopping mall in Frederick, Maryland, United States. Opened in 1978, it is anchored by JCPenney, Macy's, DSW, Ethan Allen, Barnes & Noble, and Dick's Sporting Goods. Previously, the mall housed a Sears department store that closed in 2023 and a Value City Furniture that closed in 2026.

== History ==
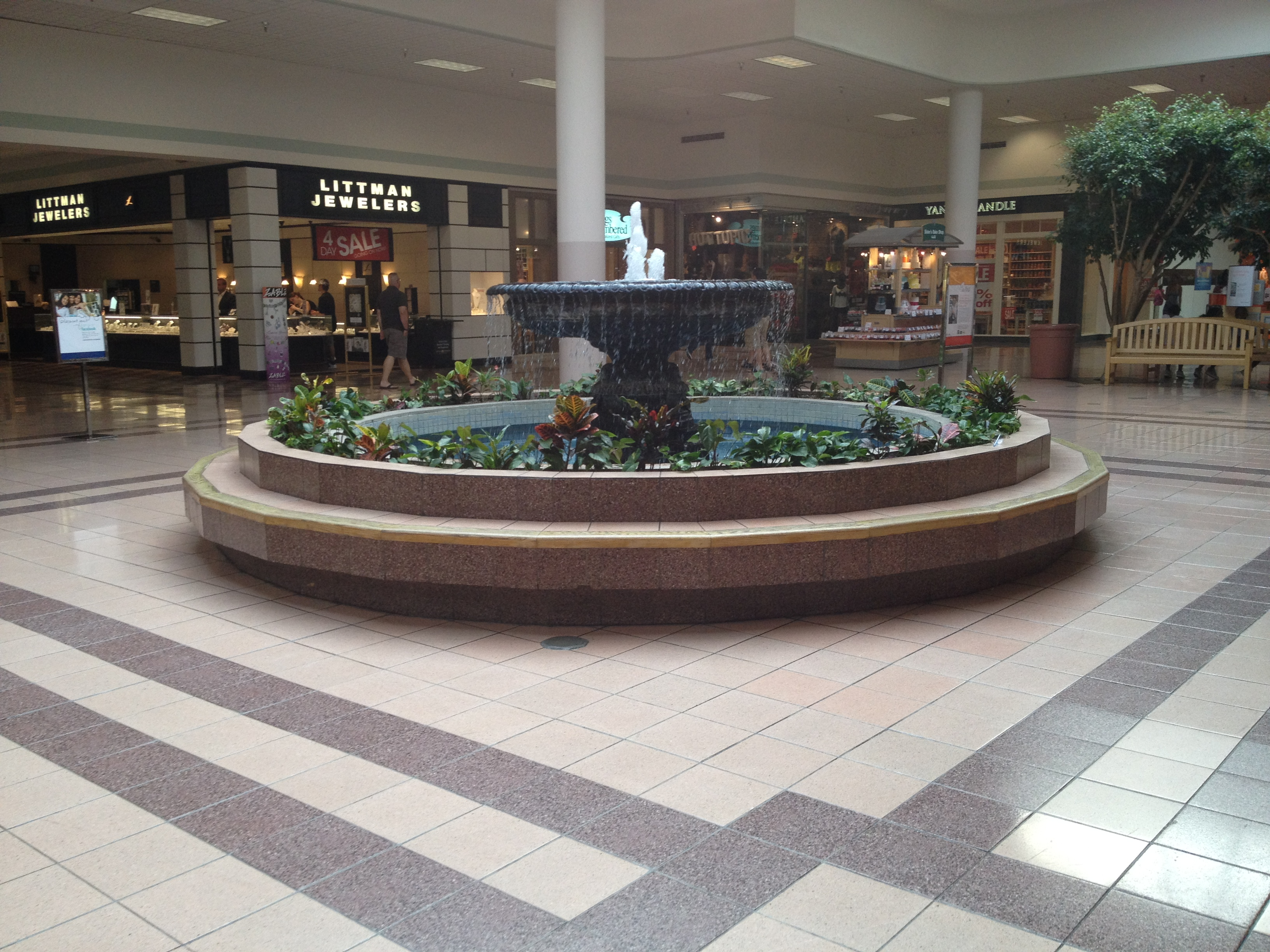
Interior view of Francis Scott Key Mall, July 2012

Original anchors at Francis Scott Key Mall in 1978 included Sears, Hess's, and Gee Bee. The mall was then owned by Crown American. It was the second mall serving Frederick, the first being Frederick Towne Mall, which opened six years prior. Leggett, now Belk, opened at the mall in 1991. The store was sold in 1996 to JCPenney, who partially relocated from Frederick Towne Mall. Woolworth, an original tenant, closed in the mid-1990s. Its space was divided among smaller stores. Also, Hess's sold its store to Hecht's in 1995. Hecht's became Macy's in 2006.

Barnes & Noble opened a store in the mall in 2007. Value City operated out of the former Gee Bee building from 1992 until 2008, when it was converted to Value City Furniture and DSW. Dick's Sporting Goods opened in a new building outside close to Sears and Value City/DSW in 2014.

On December 12, 2022, it was announced that Sears would be closing on January 15, 2023. This was the last Sears store in Maryland to stay open.

In 2024, plans were released by anchor tenant Dick’s Sporting Goods which looks to create a Dick’s House of Sport location in the old Sears building. A gym is expected to open in the current Dick’s Sporting Goods building when the new store is open. Value City Furniture closed in 2026. The mall's Red Robin will close permanently on May 24, 2026 as the company continues a major restructuring effort.
