= Marley Station Mall =

Dead mall in Anne Arundel County, Maryland, U.S.

- Interior view (April 2026)
- Location: Glen Burnie, Maryland, United States
- Coordinates: 39°8′21″N 76°36′21″W
- Address: 7900 Governor Ritchie Highway, 21061
- Opened: February 25, 1987; 39 years ago
- Developer: Taubman Centers
- Manager: Mason Asset Management
- Owner: Namdar Realty Group
- Architect: A. Alfred Taubman
- Num. of stores: 32
- Num. of anchor tenants: 4 (1 open, 3 vacant)
- Floor area: 1,069,000 square feet (99,300 m^{2})
- Floors: 2 (3 in former Macy's and Boscov's)
- Parking: Six parking lots
- Public transit: MTA Maryland bus: 70
- Website: www.shopmarleystationmall.com

Marley Station Mall is a super-regional shopping mall in Glen Burnie, Maryland. Opened in 1987, it was expanded in 1994 and 1996, with the additions of JCPenney and Sears. The mall features an 8-screen Horizon Cinemas movie theater, which was originally operated by Regal Cinemas and United Artists Theatres as the Movies at Marley Station.

The mall had a peak of 130 stores, and five anchors. As of 2026, JCPenney is the mall's last remaining senior anchor, with Gold's Gym serving as a junior anchor. The other three anchor spaces were occupied by Boscov's until 2008, Sears until late 2020, and Macy's until 2026. The Boscov's space originally held Macy's until they relocated to the Hecht's space in 2006. Under Namdar Realty Group following numerous auctions and ownership changes, the property has become a dead mall, failing to compete with the more successful Arundel Mills.

== History ==
=== 1985–1996: Development and expansions ===
Marley Station Mall began construction on the former site of Marley station along the Baltimore and Annapolis Railroad in 1985, but in April of that year, workers found human remains inside a metal trashcan on the site. The remains were those of Roger Hearn Kelso, who had died of a homicide and gone missing in 1962. Marley Station had its grand opening celebration on February 24, 1987 following a major snowstorm.

The mall was developed by the Bloomfield Hills, Michigan-based Taubman Centers and originally featured 84 inline stores, and two anchors: Hecht's and Macy's. The 8-screen UA Movies at Marley Station opened on June 5, 1987, near the mall's food court. Taubman expanded the mall in 1994 by adding a third anchor, JCPenney, which was the most-requested store among mall patrons at the time. Sears was added in 1996 as a fourth anchor, replacing an existing Sears in Glen Burnie that was built in the 1960s.

=== 2002–2012: Anchor changes ===
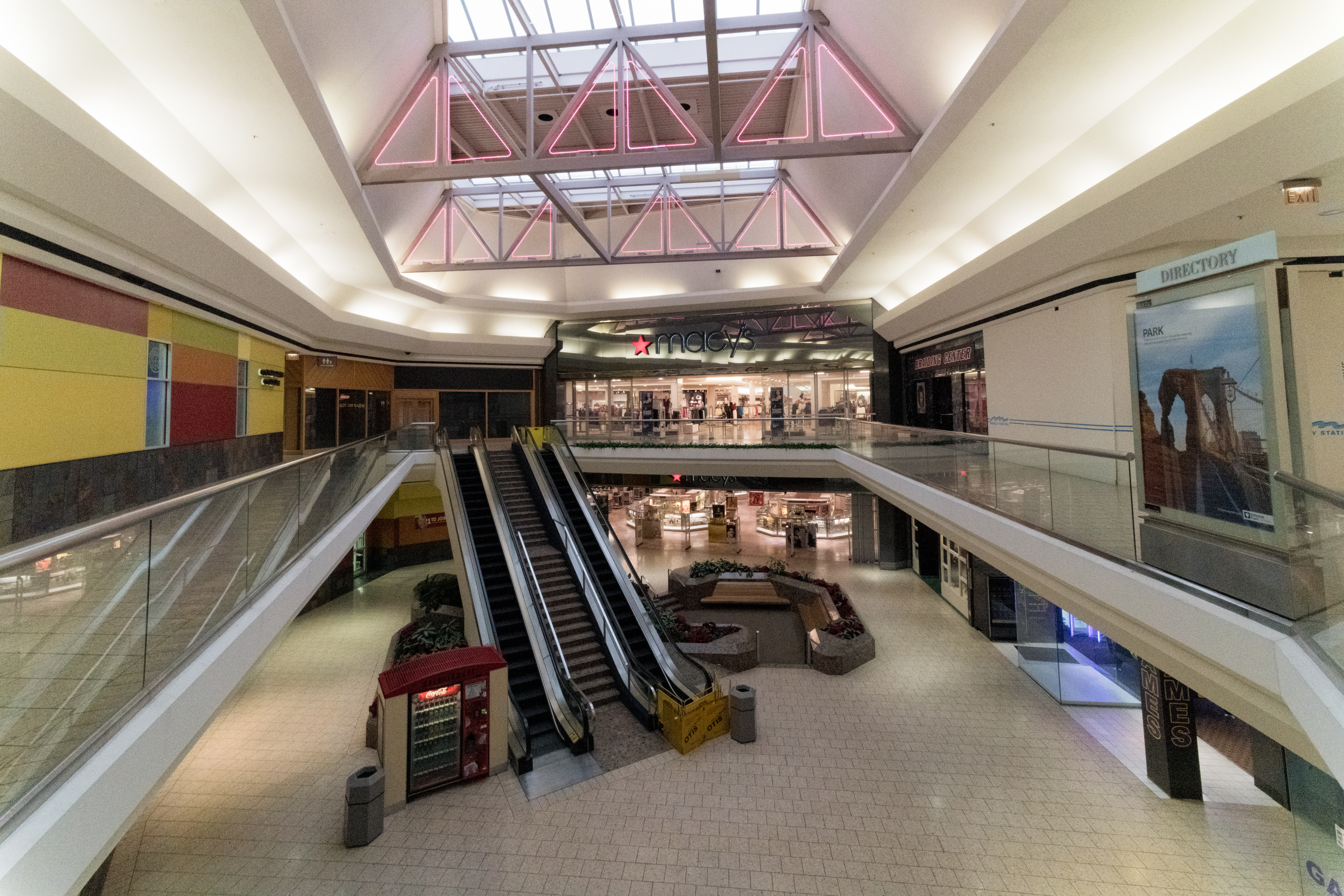
Macy's wing (December 2024)

In May 2002, United Artists Theatres, the parent company of the mall's movie theater, merged with Regal Cinemas and Edwards Theatres to form Regal Entertainment Group (REG); as a result, Movies at Marley Station was converted into Regal Cinemas. Taubman sold the mall to the Arlington, Virginia-based Mills Corporation in August 2004, which built Marley Station's nearby competitor, Arundel Mills. In February 2006, Hecht's was announced to be converted into another Macy's within the mall after Federated Department Stores acquired the May Department Stores Company. The original Macy's was sold and converted into Boscov's, and the conversion of Hecht's to Macy's began construction in April of that year.

In May 2006, The Mills Corporation was being investigated by the Securities and Exchange Commission (SEC) due to extensive accounting irregularities and fraudulent financial reporting. As a result, in February 2007, the company's portfolio, including Marley Station and Arundel Mills, would be acquired by the Indianapolis, Indiana-based Simon Property Group and Farallon Capital Management for $1.64 billion, following the rejection of Brookfield Asset Management's offer to acquire the Mills Corp. for $1.35 billion. The acquisition was completed in April 2007. Boscov's announced that they would close permanently in August 2008 as part of the chain's Chapter 11 bankruptcy proceedings.

=== 2012–present: Decline and neglect ===
A section of the mall with empty storefronts (January 2026)

Former Sears (April 2026)

As of January 2012, Marley Station had a vacancy rate of 44%, up from 33% a year earlier. On the 20th of that month, AiNET purchased the former Boscov's space, and announced in March of that year that they would open a 300,000-square-foot (28,000 m^{2}) data center called CyberNAP inside the former department store. At capacity, AiNET expected $1 billion in economic activity, and 2,500 jobs at CyberNAP.

The Woodmont Company of Dallas/Fort Worth, Texas, was appointed as the receiver to manage and lease Marley Station in March 2013 until Bank of America settles a loan dispute with Simon Property Group; otherwise, the property would undergo foreclosure. A spokeswoman for Woodmont said the occupancy rate at the mall by then was close to 85%. In June of that year, AiNET expressed an interest in buying all the properties to expand the data center throughout the mall. However Woodmont said there are no plans to sell or close down, but rather, "We are working to increase current occupancy by both retaining existing tenants as their leases renew and by leasing current vacancies." This caused a massive legal battle between AiNET and Woodmont over Common Area Maintenance (CAM) charges, leading to AiNET to countersue Woodmont, arguing that they thwarted their business opportunities by blocking the 1.5×10^{6} sq ft (140,000 m^{2}) data center expansion. However, the courts ultimately ruled against AiNET's counterclaim.

The mall was listed on the Alex Cooper Real Estate website as being up for auction on September 25, 2013. On February 20, 2014, the Regal UA movie theater closed its doors after nearly 27 years of service without notice. Two months later, mall management announced that the theater would be renovated and reopen in the summer of that year as Horizon Cinemas Marley Station Movies. On June 20, Horizon Cinemas had its grand opening with four screens—and an additional four to follow later—featuring all new 3D digital projectors, a new lobby with digital signage and upgraded concessions, updated restrooms, and roomier seating.

Moody's rates the mall's debt; as of the 2015 report, the mall had near term rollover risk and is advising investors to expect 70% losses on their investment. As of the 2016 report, the mall was 29% of the remaining fund and all classes of debt were rated as below investment grade or in default. The mall's occupancy at that point was reported as under 75%. During the same period, the mall was appraised for $39.8 million of the original $114.4 million loan—in total there was a $88.7 million difference between the appraisal and the total amount due on the loan. In a February 2016 appraisal, the mall's appraised value dropped to $31.5 million (-22.4%). In late May of that year, Aeropostale as part of its bankruptcy announced it would close its store at the mall. Marley Station was listed for auction on the Ten-X website in September, with a starting price of $5 million. The mall ownership rebuffed an earlier $10 million offer by AiNET's Deepak Jain.

In an auction ended on October 19, 2016, Marley Station was sold by LNR Properties LLC to G.L. Harris for a price revealed after closing on December 20 of that year, to be $22.7 million. LNR Properties bought the property from TKL East in 2014. TKL East obtained it through foreclosure from original owner Simon Property Group. The mall's vacancy rate was reported in January 2017 to be just over 2%. The body found when the mall was under construction was formally identified in June 2019. Marley Station Mall went back to auction on September 14, 2020. The sale price was $1.65 million plus at least $15 million existing debt. The sale was halted in November 2020 by the Texas Bankruptcy Court after Marley Station Mall LLC, a legal affiliate of G.L. Harris, filed for Chapter 7 bankruptcy.

==== Second foreclosure ====
Closure of Macy's (April 2026)

On November 6, 2020, it was announced that Sears would be closing as part of a plan to close seven stores nationwide, which left JCPenney and Macy's as the only traditional anchors left. On July 7, 2021, Alex Cooper Real Estate announced that the property would be auctioned off on July 21, at the Anne Arundel County Circuit Court, marking the mall's second foreclosure. In the fall of that year, YAM Marley Station LLC of Scottsdale, Arizona was formed as a legal affiliate of Namdar Realty Group and Mason Asset Management, which purchased ownership of Marley Station. On June 14, 2022, Marley Station's management was sold to the New York-based partnership consisting of Mason Asset and Namdar, with their plans involving an "aggressive leasing strategy" to improve current vacancy rates in the mall. However, on December 21, 2023, Namdar made a controversial business decision to hike the monthly rent from $65 to a massive $2,500 for the run by the Emmanuel Lutheran Church-ran Holiday Train Garden, a 30-year local tradition. This forced the attraction to dismantle and leave. However, it returned in late November 2024.

Thelma's Kitchen & Catering opened on December 14 of that year. In December 2025, an Anne Arundel County judge ordered Namdar to pay over $400,000 to settle a breach-of-lease lawsuit filed by Gold's Gym. On January 8, 2026, Macy's announced that it would be closing as part of a plan to close 14 stores by the end of Q1 2026, leaving Marley Station with only JCPenney as its last traditional anchor, and Horizon Cinemas.

== Gallery ==
JCPenney wing (April 2026)

An entrance from the interior that is immediately greeted with vacant storefronts (April 2026)

Horizon Cinemas, with the original UA Movies at Marley Station branding intact (January 2026)

Former Boscov's (January 2026)

An entrance to the mall at night (January 2026)

== See also ==
- Lakeforest Mall
- Pittsburgh Mills
- St. Louis Mills
- White Marsh Mall
- UA Movies at Harbor Park
