= Centre at Glen Burnie =

Shopping center in Anne Arundel County, Maryland, U.S.

The Centre at Glen Burnie
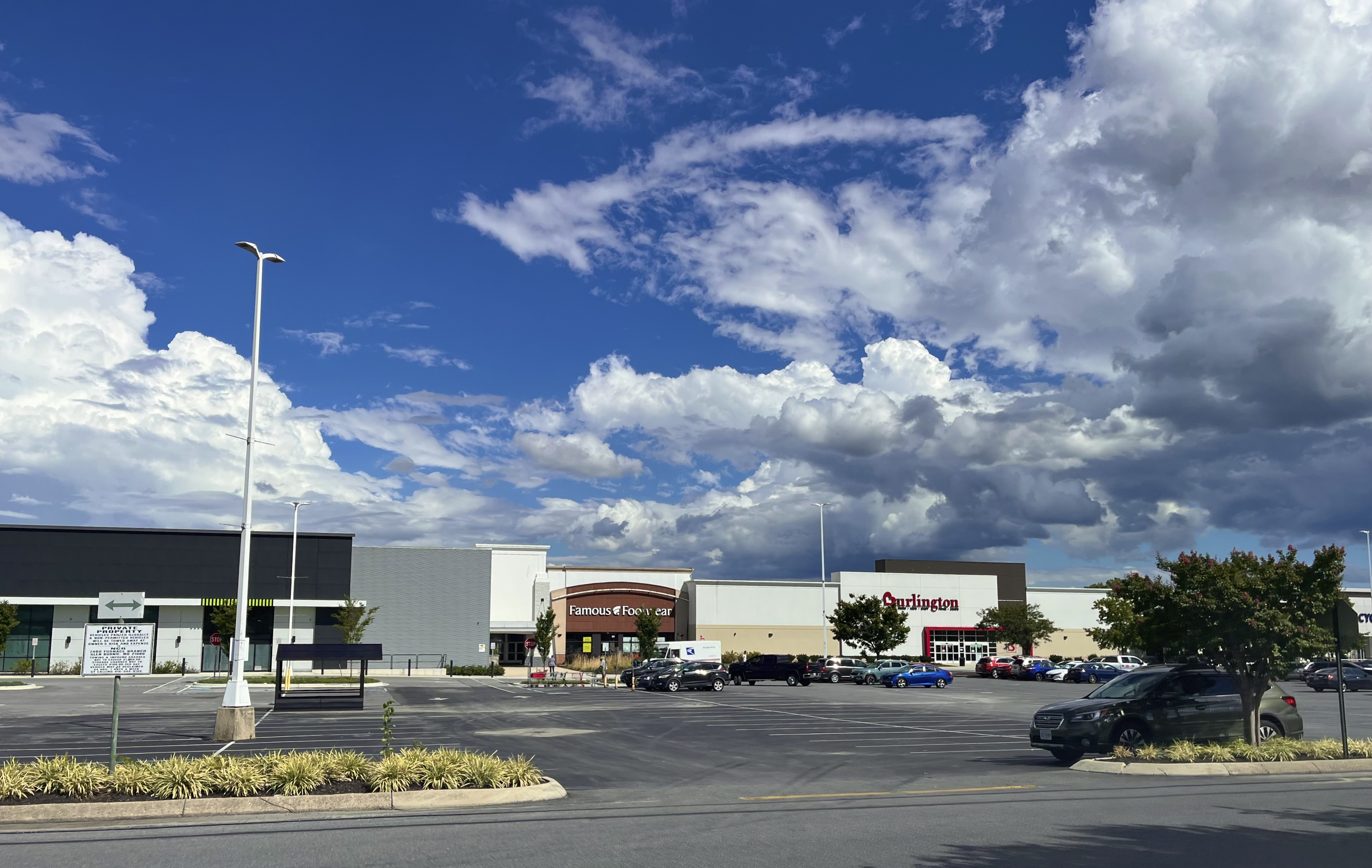
- The center in August 2024
- Location: Glen Burnie, Maryland, United States
- Coordinates: 39.1913°N 76.6107°W
- Address: 6711 Ritchie Highway, 21061
- Opened: 1963; 63 years ago (as an indoor mall); 2022; 4 years ago (as an outdoor mall)
- Closed: 2018; 8 years ago (as an indoor mall)
- Developer: Edward J. DeBartolo Corporation
- Manager: LNR Property LLC
- Owner: Goodman Properties
- Num. of stores: 16
- Num. of anchor tenants: 3
- Floors: 1
- Parking: 2,212
- Website: www.goodmanproperties.org/goodman-properties/centre-at-glen-burnie/

The Centre at Glen Burnie is a power center in Glen Burnie, Maryland. It is owned by Goodman Properties and managed by 6711 Glen Burnie Retail, LLC a subsidiary of LNR Property Inc. Formerly an enclosed shopping mall, it has the following anchors: Burlington, Ollie's Bargain Outlet, and Target.

== History ==
The center opened in 1963 as the Glen Burnie Mall, the third shopping mall developed by Edward J. DeBartolo, Sr. At the time of its opening it had Montgomery Ward as an anchor as well as an A&P grocery store, a G.C. Murphy variety store and a single-screen movie theater. The mall's second anchor, a Topps Discount City (a division of Interstate Department Stores), was dedicated in March 1969. This store was shuttered in late 1974. There was also a Dick's Sporting Goods occupying one of the anchor spaces, but it closed in the early 2000s and reopened a few years later across the street. The former sporting goods store was used as a furniture clearance center but closed about a year or two later. Toys "R" Us (another Interstate division) opened a store in the Topps space, as did Baltimore-based Epstein's department store. Toys "R" Us closed its store in 2018 due to Chapter 11 bankruptcy. Half of the Topps space that was occupied by Toys "R" Us became an Ollie's Bargain Outlet in 2018. The half of the former Topps was once occupied by Best Buy, which moved across the street in 2010. The space was then converted into H.H. Gregg in 2011, but it went out of business six years later and closed all locations in 2017. The former H.H. Gregg space was used as a seasonal Spirit Halloween store, but it, along with the former Office Depot next door, has since been turned into a single space for a yet-to-be-named store. Next door was Office Depot, which closed in 2019. A fire damaged the north end of the mall on October 24, 1981. The center, except for Montgomery Ward, was closed while renovations could be completed. The mall re-opened in November 1982.

Montgomery Ward went out of business in 2000. In 2002, the mall was sold to Petrie Ventures, which announced plans to tear down the vacant Wards store and built a new Target discount store. The mall also underwent extensive renovations that added outward-facing retail bays. In 2005, the mall was renamed as Centre at Glen Burnie. In 2012, Jones Lang LaSalle was named leasing agent and manager of the center.

The property was transferred on March 14, 2016, from the legal entity BACM 2006-5 Ritchie Highway LLC to one known as 6711 Glen Burnie Retail LLC for a book amount of $15M. Both LLC's are, in turn, ultimately owned by Starwood Property Trust LLC in Greenwich, CT. Starwood owns the property through its $1.05 billion acquisition of LNR Property LLC and its subsidiary LNR Partners LLC of Miami, FL in 2013.

== Shopping center ==
In 2018, renovations were underway to the Centre at Glen Burnie to become an outdoor strip mall. By 2022, the strip mall opened, with the former Dick's Sporting Goods space now demolished.
