= Wrestling at the 1976 Summer Olympics – Men's freestyle 68 kg =

Men's freestyle 68 kg at the Games of the XXI Olympiad
- Venue: Maurice Richard Arena
- Dates: 27–31 July 1976
- Competitors: 24 from 24 nations

Medalists
1st place, gold medalist(s)		Pavel Pinigin	Soviet Union
2nd place, silver medalist(s)		Lloyd Keaser	United States
3rd place, bronze medalist(s)		Yasaburo Sugawara	Japan

The Men's Freestyle 68 kg at the 1976 Summer Olympics as part of the wrestling program were held at the Maurice Richard Arena.

== Medalists ==
Gold	Pavel Pinigin; Soviet Union
Silver	Lloyd Keaser; United States
Bronze	Yasaburo Sugawara; Japan

== Tournament results ==
The competition used a form of negative points tournament, with negative points given for any result short of a fall. Accumulation of 6 negative points eliminated the loser wrestler. When only three wrestlers remain, a special final round is used to determine the order of the medals.

Legend

- TF — Won by Fall
- IN — Won by Opponent Injury
- DQ — Won by Passivity
- D1 — Won by Passivity, the winner is passive too
- D2 — Both wrestlers lost by Passivity
- FF — Won by Forfeit
- DNA — Did not appear
- TPP — Total penalty points
- MPP — Match penalty points

Penalties

- 0 — Won by Fall, Technical Superiority, Passivity, Injury and Forfeit
- 0.5 — Won by Points, 8-11 points difference
- 1 — Won by Points, 1-7 points difference
- 2 — Won by Passivity, the winner is passive too
- 3 — Lost by Points, 1-7 points difference
- 3.5 — Lost by Points, 8-11 points difference
- 4 — Lost by Fall, Technical Superiority, Passivity, Injury and Forfeit

=== Round 1 ===
TPP	MPP		Score		MPP	TPP
0	0	Tsedendambyn Natsagdorj (MGL)	21 - 6	Zsigmond Kelevitz (AUS)	4	4
4	4	Segundo Olmedo (PAN)	TF / 2:43	Go Jin-won (KOR)	0	0
3	3	Rafael González (PUR)	13 - 16	Lennart Lundell (SWE)	1	1
4	4	Ronald Joseph (ISV)	TF / 2:09	Rami Miron (ISR)	0	0
1	1	Doncho Zhekov (BUL)	9 - 4	János Kocsis (HUN)	3	3
0	0	José Ramos (CUB)	TF / 7:79	Clive Llewellyn (CAN)	4	4
0	0	Eberhard Probst (GDR)	TF / 1:32	Arona Mané (SEN)	4	4
0	0	Joseph Gilligan (GBR)	TF / 2:30	Sergio Fiszman (ARG)	4	4
4	4	Gerhard Weisenberger (FRG)	7 - 19	Mohammad Reza Navaei (IRI)	0	0
4	4	Kari Övermark (FIN)	4 - 20	Lloyd Keaser (USA)	0	0
1	1	Yasaburo Sugawara (JPN)	8 - 7	Mehmet Sarı (TUR)	3	3
3	3	Šaban Sejdiu (YUG)	3 - 8	Pavel Pinigin (URS)	1	1

=== Round 2 ===
TPP	MPP		Score		MPP	TPP
0	0	Tsedendambyn Natsagdorj (MGL)	19 - 4	Segundo Olmedo (PAN)	4	8
5	1	Zsigmond Kelevitz (AUS)	11 - 8	Ko Jin-Won (KOR)	3	3
3	0	Rafael González (PUR)	TF / 2:08	Ronald Joseph (ISV)	4	8
5	4	Lennart Lundell (SWE)	3 - 16	Rami Miron (ISR)	0	0
4	3	Doncho Zhekov (BUL)	4 - 9	José Ramos (CUB)	1	1
4	1	János Kocsis (HUN)	7 - 5	Clive Llewellyn (CAN)	3	7
0	0	Eberhard Probst (GDR)	TF / 4:51	Joseph Gilligan (GBR)	4	4
8	4	Arona Mané (SEN)	TF / 4:49	Sergio Fiszman (ARG)	0	4
4.5	0.5	Gerhard Weisenberger (FRG)	24 - 14	Kari Övermark (FIN)	3.5	8.5
4	4	Mohammad Reza Navaei (IRI)	TF / 6:40	Lloyd Keaser (USA)	0	0
1	0	Yasaburo Sugawara (JPN)	TF / 2:31	Šaban Sejdiu (YUG)	4	7
6	3	Mehmet Sarı (TUR)	3 - 10	Pavel Pinigin (URS)	1	2

=== Round 3 ===
TPP	MPP		Score		MPP	TPP
1	1	Tsedendambyn Natsagdorj (MGL)	9 - 6	Ko Jin-Won (KOR)	3	6
5	0	Zsigmond Kelevitz (AUS)	TF / 1:48	Rafael González (PUR)	4	7
9	4	Lennart Lundell (SWE)	3 - 17	Doncho Zhekov (BUL)	0	4
4	4	Rami Miron (ISR)	DQ / 7:42	János Kocsis (HUN)	0	4
2	1	José Ramos (CUB)	10 - 8	Eberhard Probst (GDR)	3	3
8	4	Joseph Gilligan (GBR)	TF / 5:56	Gerhard Weisenberger (FRG)	0	4.5
8	4	Sergio Fiszman (ARG)	TF / 4:44	Mohammad Reza Navaei (IRI)	0	4
0	0	Lloyd Keaser (USA)	DQ / 4:21	Yasaburo Sugawara (JPN)	4	5
2		Pavel Pinigin (URS)		Bye		

=== Round 4 ===
TPP	MPP		Score		MPP	TPP
3	1	Pavel Pinigin (URS)	4 - 3	Tsedendambyn Natsagdorj (MGL)	3	4
8	3	Zsigmond Kelevitz (AUS)	4 - 7	Rami Miron (ISR)	1	5
4.5	0.5	Doncho Zhekov (BUL)	13 - 5	Eberhard Probst (GDR)	3.5	6.5
7	3	János Kocsis (HUN)	3 - 8	José Ramos (CUB)	1	3
8.5	4	Gerhard Weisenberger (FRG)	TF / 1:55	Lloyd Keaser (USA)	0	0
8	4	Mohammad Reza Navaei (IRI)	1 - 16	Yasaburo Sugawara (JPN)	0	5

=== Round 5 ===
TPP	MPP		Score		MPP	TPP
3	0	Pavel Pinigin (URS)	DQ / 7:06	Rami Miron (ISR)	4	9
7	3	Tsedendambyn Natsagdorj (MGL)	7 - 7	Doncho Zhekov (BUL)	1	5.5
7	4	José Ramos (CUB)	DQ / 7:47	Lloyd Keaser (USA)	0	0
5		Yasaburo Sugawara (JPN)		Bye		

=== Round 6 ===
TPP	MPP		Score		MPP	TPP
6	1	Yasaburo Sugawara (JPN)	5 - 5	Pavel Pinigin (URS)	3	6
8.5	3	Doncho Zhekov (BUL)	5 - 9	Lloyd Keaser (USA)	1	1

=== Final ===
Results from the preliminary round are carried forward into the final (shown in yellow).

TPP	MPP		Score		MPP	TPP
	0	Lloyd Keaser (USA)	DQ / 4:21	Yasaburo Sugawara (JPN)	4	
5	1	Yasaburo Sugawara (JPN)	5 - 5	Pavel Pinigin (URS)	3	
3.5	0.5	Pavel Pinigin (URS)	12 - 1	Lloyd Keaser (USA)	3.5	3.5

== Final standings ==
1. Pavel Pinigin (URS)
2. Lloyd Keaser (USA)
3. Yasaburo Sugawara (JPN)
4. Doncho Zhekov (BUL)
5. José Ramos (CUB)
6. Tsedendambyn Natsagdorj (MGL)
7. Rami Miron (ISR)
8. Eberhard Probst (GDR)
