= Maryland Route 648 =

Highway in Maryland

Maryland Route 648
- Maryland Route 648 highlighted in red

Route information
- Maintained by MDSHA and Baltimore DOT
- Existed: 1938–present

Location
- Country: United States
- State: Maryland
- Counties: Anne Arundel, Baltimore, City of Baltimore

Highway system
- Maryland highway system; Interstate; US; State; Scenic Byways
← MD 646	→ MD 650

Maryland Route 648 (MD 648) is a collection of state highways in the U.S. state of Maryland. These nine highways are current or former sections of the Baltimore–Annapolis Boulevard between Annapolis and Baltimore via Glen Burnie. There are five signed mainline segments of MD 648 through Arnold, Severna Park, Pasadena, Glen Burnie, Ferndale, and Pumphrey in northern Anne Arundel County; Baltimore Highlands in southern Baltimore County; and the independent city of Baltimore. MD 648 mainly serves local traffic along its meandering route, with long-distance traffic intended to use the parallel and straighter MD 2 south of Glen Burnie and freeway-grade Interstate 97 (I-97), I-695, and MD 295 between Glen Burnie and Baltimore.

The Baltimore–Annapolis Boulevard was constructed in the early to mid-1910s as the primary highway between Baltimore and Annapolis. The highway was specifically authorized by the Maryland General Assembly, which insisted the Maryland State Roads Commission complete the highway along its originally planned route instead of using what is now MD 2 north of Glen Burnie. The boulevard was designated parts of MD 2 and MD 3 in 1927; the latter number was replaced with U.S. Route 301 (US 301) in 1939. MD 648 was assigned to the Baltimore–Annapolis Boulevard south of Glen Burnie in the late 1930s after it was functionally replaced by MD 2's present course. In the late 1950s, after US 301 was moved to freeways from south of Glen Burnie to Baltimore, MD 648 was extended north from Glen Burnie into Baltimore. MD 648 has had few major changes since then, the most significant being relocations between Pasadena and Glen Burnie in the 1970s.

== Route description ==
There are five mainline segments of MD 648.

- MD 648A runs 2.09 miles (3.36 km) from MD 450 just east of the Severn River at Annapolis to a dead end located just south of US 50 and US 301 near Arnold.
- MD 648F has a length of 0.61 miles (0.98 km) from a ramp from westbound US 50 and US 301 immediately to the north of MD 648A's terminus to MD 2 in Arnold.
- MD 648D extends 4.18 miles (6.73 km) between intersections with MD 2 in Arnold and Severna Park.
- MD 648H runs 3.49 miles (5.62 km) from MD 2 in Severna Park north to MD 177 in Pasadena.
- MD 648E has a length of 11.15 miles (17.94 km) from MD 177 in Pasadena north to MD 295 in the city of Baltimore.

=== Annapolis–Arnold ===
Maryland Route 648A
- Location: Annapolis–Arnold
- Length: 2.09 mi (3.36 km)

MD 648A begins at an intersection with MD 450 (Baltimore–Annapolis Boulevard/Governor Ritchie Highway) just east of the Naval Academy Bridge that crosses the Severn River into the city of Annapolis. The state highway heads east and immediately intersects the access road for Jonas Green Park, which is unsigned MD 648AB. At the junction with MD 672 (Greenbury Point Road), which serves several facilities of the U.S. Navy and U.S. Naval Academy, MD 648 turns north and meets the west end of MD 179 (Saint Margarets Road). The state highway continues north through a forested residential area to its terminus at a dead end just south of US 50 and US 301, which run concurrently as Blue Star Memorial Highway. The westbound direction of the freeway has a right-in/right-out intersection with MD 648F directly opposite from the dead end of MD 648A. MD 648F heads west parallel to the freeway then turns north to a partial intersection with MD 2 (Governor Ritchie Highway). There is no access from northbound MD 648F to southbound MD 2.

=== Arnold–Severna Park ===
Maryland Route 648D
- Location: Arnold–Severna Park
- Length: 4.18 mi (6.73 km)

There are two county-maintained segments of Baltimore–Annapolis Boulevard on the southbound and northbound sides, respectively, of MD 2 (Governor Ritchie Highway) through Arnold. MD 648D begins at an intersection with MD 2 in Arnold a short distance north of the second county highway loop. The state highway parallels the southbound direction of MD 2 and the Baltimore & Annapolis Trail, which the highway follows closely except close to its termini. On the northern end of Arnold, MD 648 and MD 2 approach closely; within this stretch there is a spur from MD 648 to southbound MD 2 and a spur from both directions of MD 2 to MD 648. The state highway leaves the vicinity of MD 2 then splits from the rail trail to its northern terminus at an oblique intersection with MD 2 within a commercial area in Severna Park.

=== Severna Park–Pasadena ===
Maryland Route 648H
- Location: Severna Park–Pasadena
- Length: 3.49 mi (5.62 km)

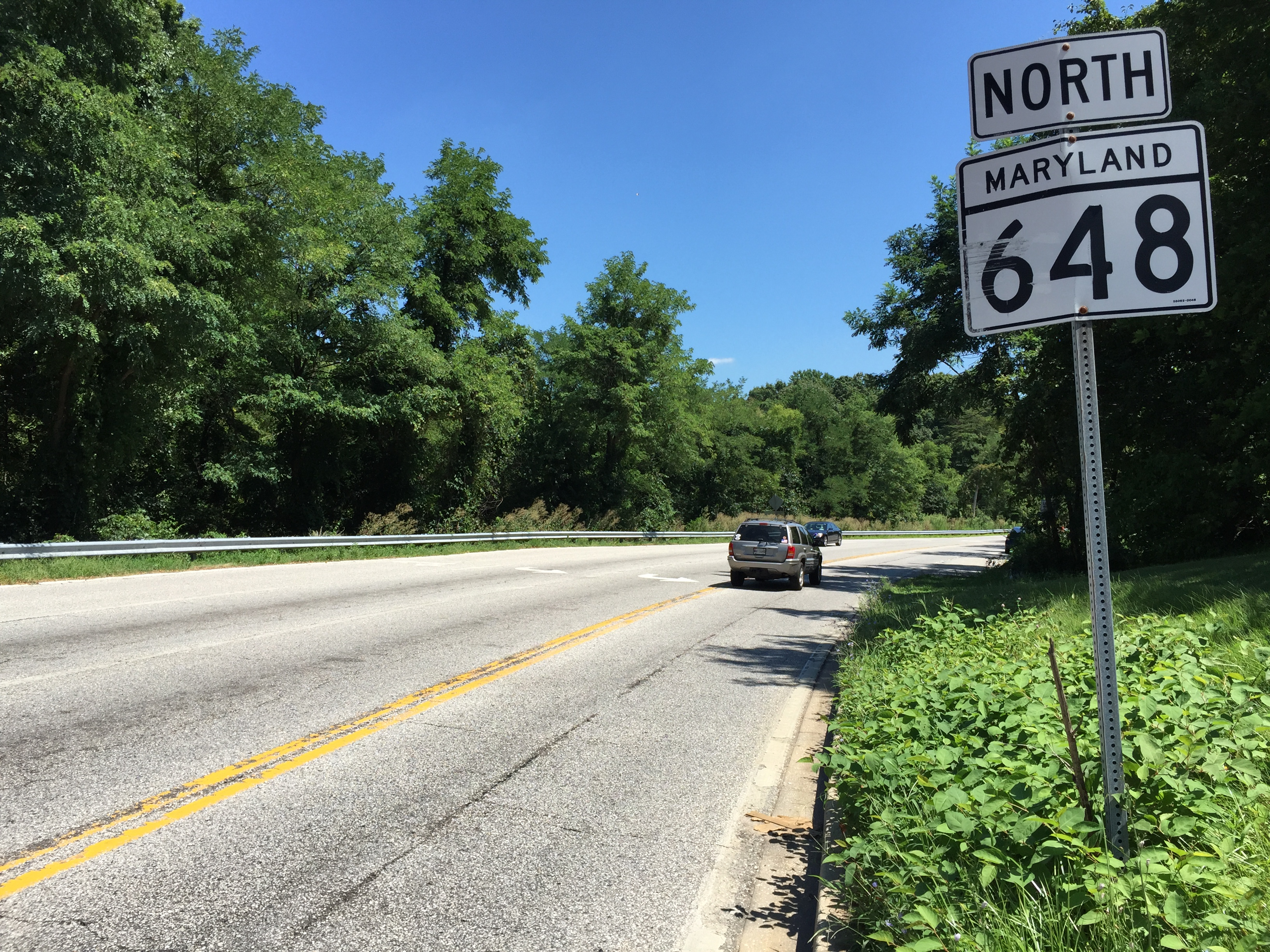
MD 648H northbound past MD 2 in Severna Park

MD 648H begins at an intersection with MD 2 (Governor Ritchie Highway) in Severna Park. The state highway heads east, crossing Cattail Creek before intersecting Asbury Drive, which is unsigned MD 648AA. MD 648 veers north through residential subdivisions in Pasadena. The state highway passes along the eastern edge of Waterford Park, where the highway crosses the Magothy River just downstream from its impoundment, Lake Waterford. Just north of the lake, Baltimore–Annapolis Boulevard veers to the northwest as unsigned MD 915. MD 648 continues north as Waterford Road. The state highway crosses over MD 100 (Paul T. Pitcher Memorial Highway) with no access before reaching its northern terminus at MD 177 (Mountain Road).

=== Pasadena–Baltimore ===
Maryland Route 648E
- Location: Pasadena–Baltimore
- Length: 11.15 mi (17.94 km)

MD 648E, which is the longest section of MD 648, is mostly located in Anne Arundel County; a small portion of the highway passes through the southeastern corner of Baltimore County before heading into Baltimore, where the highway is maintained by the Baltimore City Department of Transportation. MD 648 has freeway connections with MD 10 and I-97 in Glen Burnie, I-695 in Ferndale, and MD 295 in Baltimore. The state highway is a part of the National Highway System between I-97 and the entrance to the Glen Burnie station of MTA Maryland's Baltimore Light RailLink.

MD 648E begins at an intersection with MD 177 (Mountain Road) and Jumpers Hole Road at Lipins Corner near Pasadena, about 1 mile (1.6 km) west of the intersection of MD 177 and MD 648H. This intersection is a short distance to the east of MD 177's partial interchanges with MD 10 and MD 100 (Paul T. Pitcher Highway) and the highway's western terminus at MD 2. MD 648 heads north as a three-lane road with center turn lane through residential subdivisions. The state highway expands to a five-lane road with center turn lane as it curves to the west, crosses Marley Creek, and intersects MD 270 (Furnace Branch Road); the south leg of that intersection is unsigned MD 648G, which is also named Baltimore–Annapolis Boulevard. MD 648 temporarily becomes a four-lane divided highway through its partial cloverleaf interchange with MD 10 (Arundel Expressway).

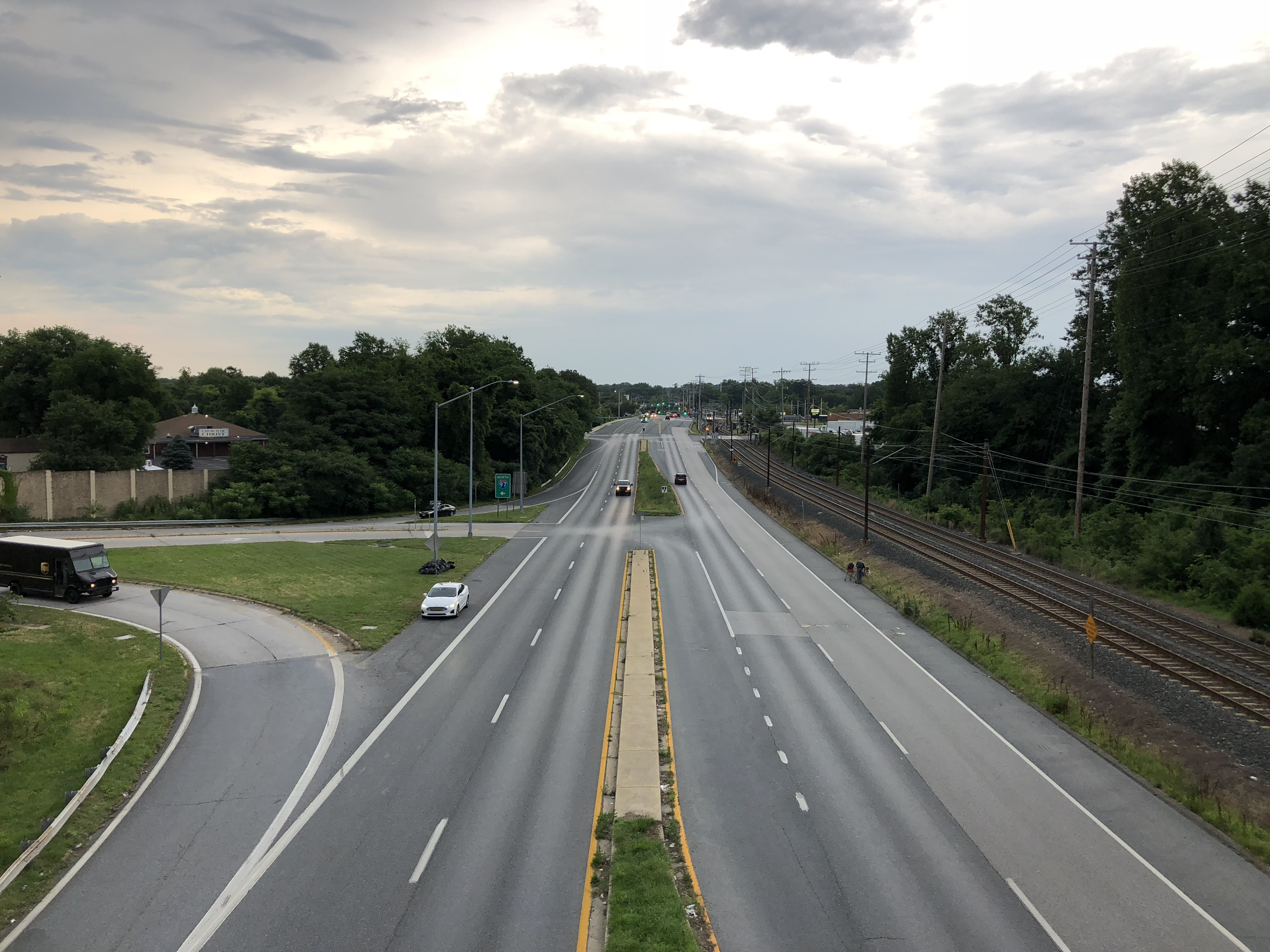
MD 648E southbound viewed from I-97 in Ferndale

MD 648 reduces to two lanes as it passes through a residential neighborhood in Glen Burnie, passing to the north of Glen Burnie High School. The state highway curves to the northwest through a commercial area in the center of the suburb where the highway intersects MD 2 (Governor Ritchie Highway) and MD 3 Business (Robert Crain Highway). MD 648 expands to a four-lane undivided highway at its intersection with Eighth Avenue and MD 176 (Dorsey Road), which heads west toward Baltimore/Washington International Thurgood Marshall Airport. The state highway begins to parallel MTA Maryland's Baltimore Light RailLink and its southern terminal station, Cromwell / Glen Burnie station. North of the station, MD 648 becomes divided and has a folded diamond interchange with I-97.

MD 648 continues to parallel the transit line as a two-lane road north through Ferndale. The state highway passes the Ferndale station in the center of the community. MD 648 veers north away from the transit line at Hollins Ferry Road, then passes North County High School and crosses Cabin Branch. The state highway intersects Furnace Branch Road and the eastern end of MD 169 (Maple Road) prior to meeting I-695 (Baltimore Beltway) at a partial cloverleaf interchange. In the center of Pumphrey, MD 648 intersects MD 170, which heads northeast as Belle Grove Road and southwest as Camp Meade Road past the North Linthicum station on the light rail line. The state highway passes under the Baltimore Light RailLink tracks and begins to parallel them. MD 648 intersects MD 168 (Nursery Road) just west of the Nursery Road station shortly before the highway veers away from the transit line and crosses the Patapsco River.

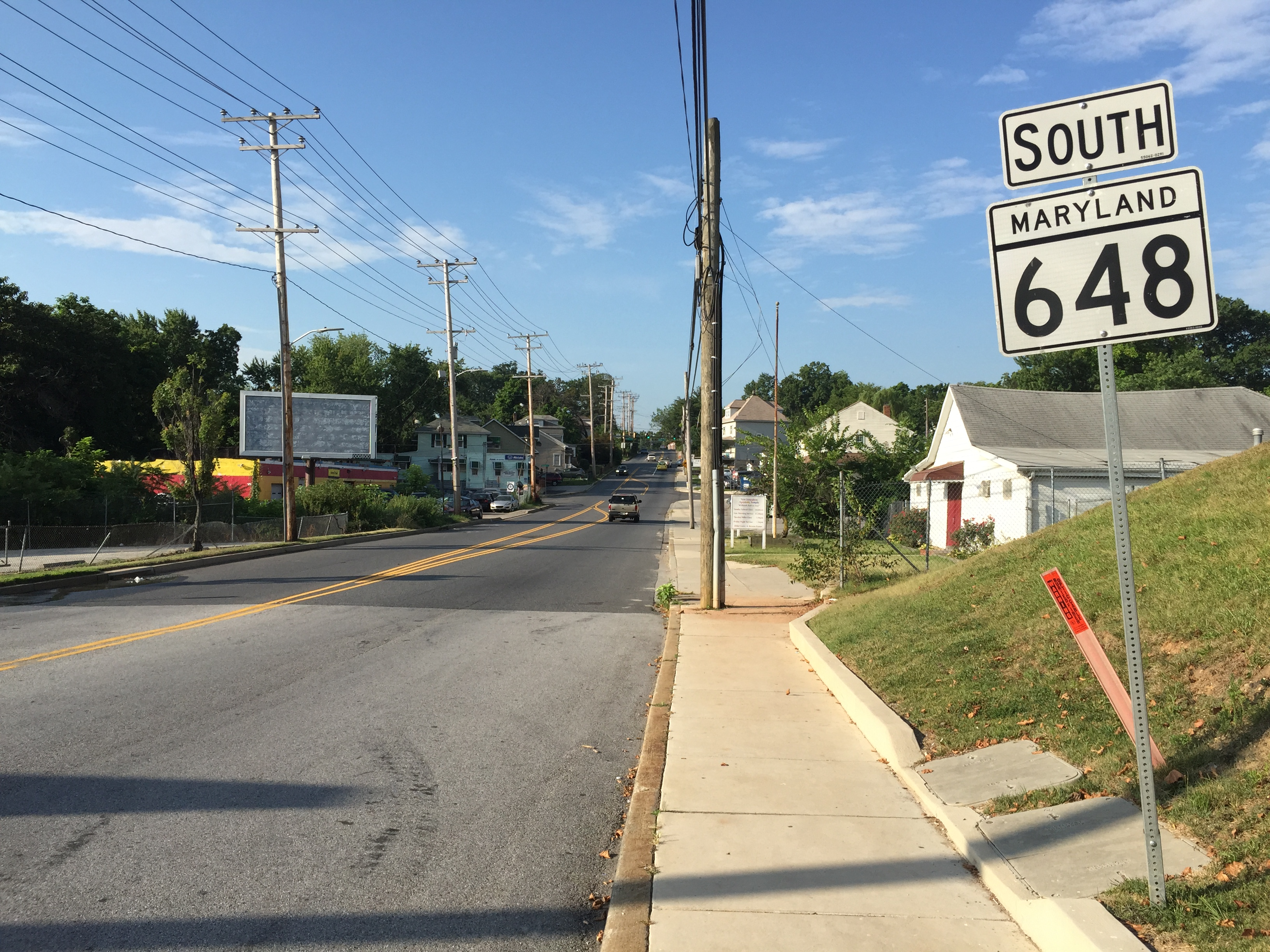
View south along MD 648 just south of the Baltimore city limits in Lansdowne

MD 648 continues north as Old Annapolis Road, crossing under I-895 (Harbor Tunnel Thruway) with no access before passing through the suburb of Baltimore Highlands in the southeastern corner of Baltimore County. The state highway enters the city of Baltimore and its name changes to Annapolis Road shortly before intersecting Patapsco Avenue. MD 648 crosses over MD 295 (Baltimore–Washington Parkway) and under the Curtis Bay Branch of CSX's Baltimore Terminal Subdivision railroad line. The state highway intersects ramps to and from the southbound parkway as it passes to the east of Mount Auburn Cemetery. MD 648 has a pair of intersections with Waterview Avenue on both sides of an east–west segment to cross to the east side of MD 295. The state highway passes through the Westport neighborhood, where Wenburn Street and Manokin Street lead west to ramps with the northbound and southbound directions of the parkway, respectively. MD 648 meets a pair of rail lines at-grade, intersects Monroe Street, and passes under I-95 before crossing over Gwynns Falls. The state highway reaches its northern terminus at a right-in/right-out interchange with the ramp from northbound I-95 to northbound MD 295, which continues north as Russell Street toward Downtown Baltimore.

MD 648E is a part of the National Highway System as an intermodal connector from the entrance to the Cromwell Station / Glen Burnie light rail station to I-97 in Glen Burnie.

== History ==
=== Baltimore–Annapolis Boulevard constructed ===
The original designation of much of Baltimore–Annapolis Boulevard was MD 2

In 1910, the Maryland General Assembly authorized funding for the construction of a boulevard between Annapolis and Baltimore. This boulevard, which would have a minimum road width of 16 feet (4.9 m), would begin in Annapolis, cross the Severn River, head northwest to Glen Burnie, and continue through Anne Arundel and Baltimore counties to the tracks of the Baltimore and Ohio Railroad (B&O Railroad) in South Baltimore. The newly formed Maryland State Roads Commission was placed in charge of constructing the new Baltimore–Annapolis Boulevard. The boulevard was constructed as a 16-foot (4.9 m) wide macadam road from the Severn River north to Arnold and from Severna Park to Pasadena in 1910 and 1911. The sections between Arnold and Severna Park and from Pasadena to Glen Burnie were completed in 1912. The boulevard followed much of what is today MD 648, with the major difference being in Pasadena, where instead of following Waterford Road north to MD 177, the boulevard headed northwest along what are discontinuous segments of MD 915 to Lipins Corner.

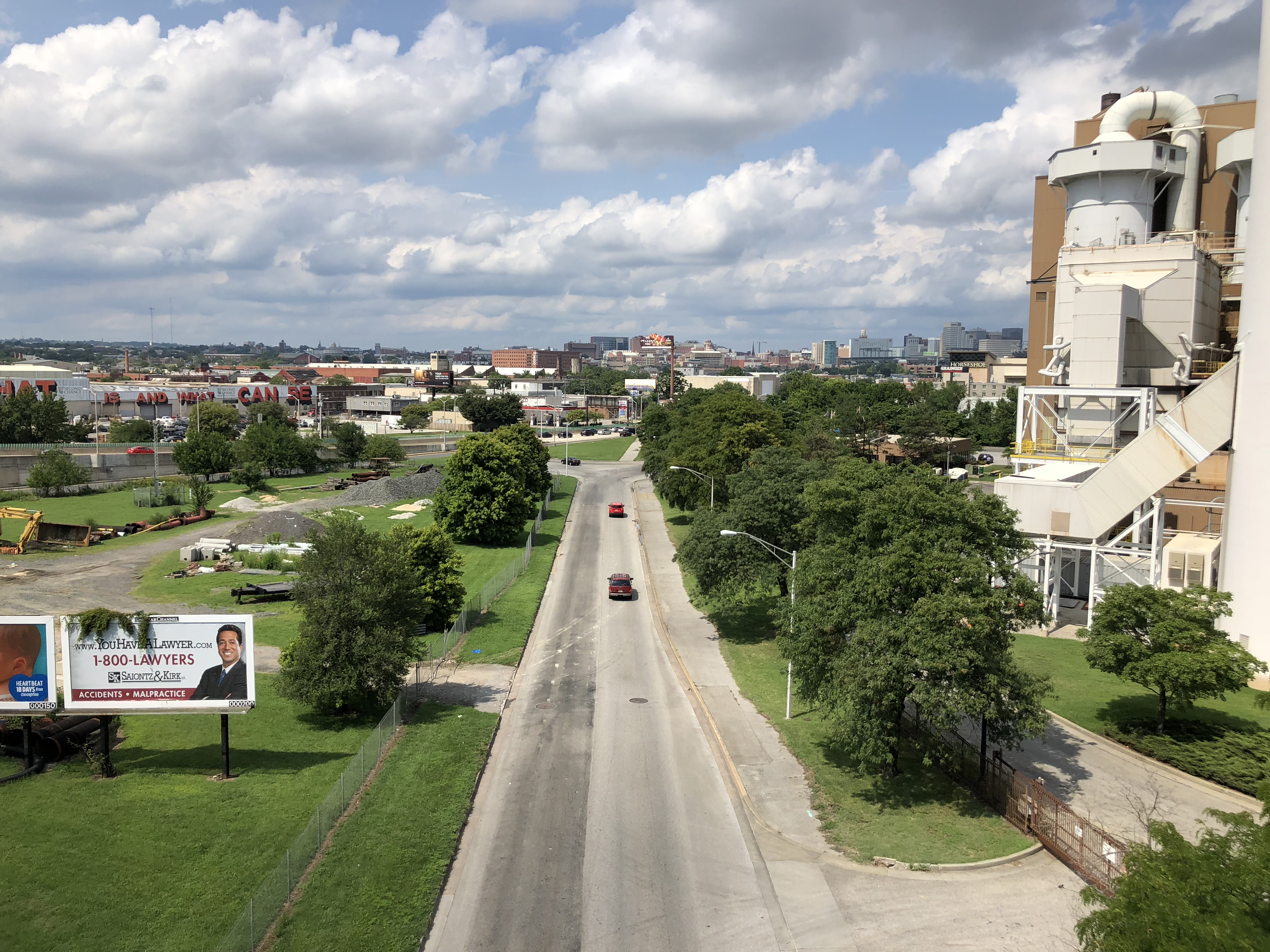
The north end of MD 648 at MD 295, viewed from I-95 in Baltimore

Unrelated to the Baltimore–Annapolis Boulevard, the commission constructed a 14-to-18-foot (4.3 to 5.5 m) wide macadam road from Glen Burnie to Brooklyn, which was then in Anne Arundel County. In Brooklyn, the new highway connected with the south end of the Light Street Bridge that crossed the Patapsco River into Baltimore. The first section of the highway between Glen Burnie and South Baltimore was an 18-foot (5.5 m) wide macadam road that had been started in 1909, prior to the 1910 act. This highway was completed in 1911 from the Western Maryland Railway crossing in Westport, then part of Anne Arundel County, south to the English Consul Estate, which is now the community of Baltimore Highlands. With a road completed from Annapolis to Baltimore, the roads commission suggested that it should not be required to complete a road between Glen Burnie and South Baltimore. The commission asked the Maryland General Assembly to pass a bill releasing the commission from the responsibility of completing the highway from Glen Burnie to South Baltimore.

However, the Maryland General Assembly disagreed with the Maryland State Roads Commission and passed a bill in 1914 requiring the commission to finish the boulevard between Glen Burnie and South Baltimore. The Baltimore–Annapolis Boulevard was constructed as a 16-foot (4.9 m) wide concrete road from Glen Burnie to Pumphrey and from the Patapsco River to the English Consul Estate in 1914 and 1915. The northernmost part of the boulevard was constructed as a 60-foot (18 m) wide street surfaced with asphalt, bricks, and granite blocks from Westport into the city, where the highway followed Russell Street, Bush Street, and Ridgely Street to the B&O Railroad crossing southwest of the present location of M&T Bank Stadium. The final section of the Baltimore–Annapolis Boulevard was completed in 1916 as a 16-foot (4.9 m) wide concrete road from Pumphrey to the Patapsco River. This segment included a 24-foot (7.3 m) wide, 14-foot (4.3 m) high underpass of the Washington, Baltimore and Annapolis Electric Railway at Pumphrey completed the same year.

=== Improvements and redesignation ===
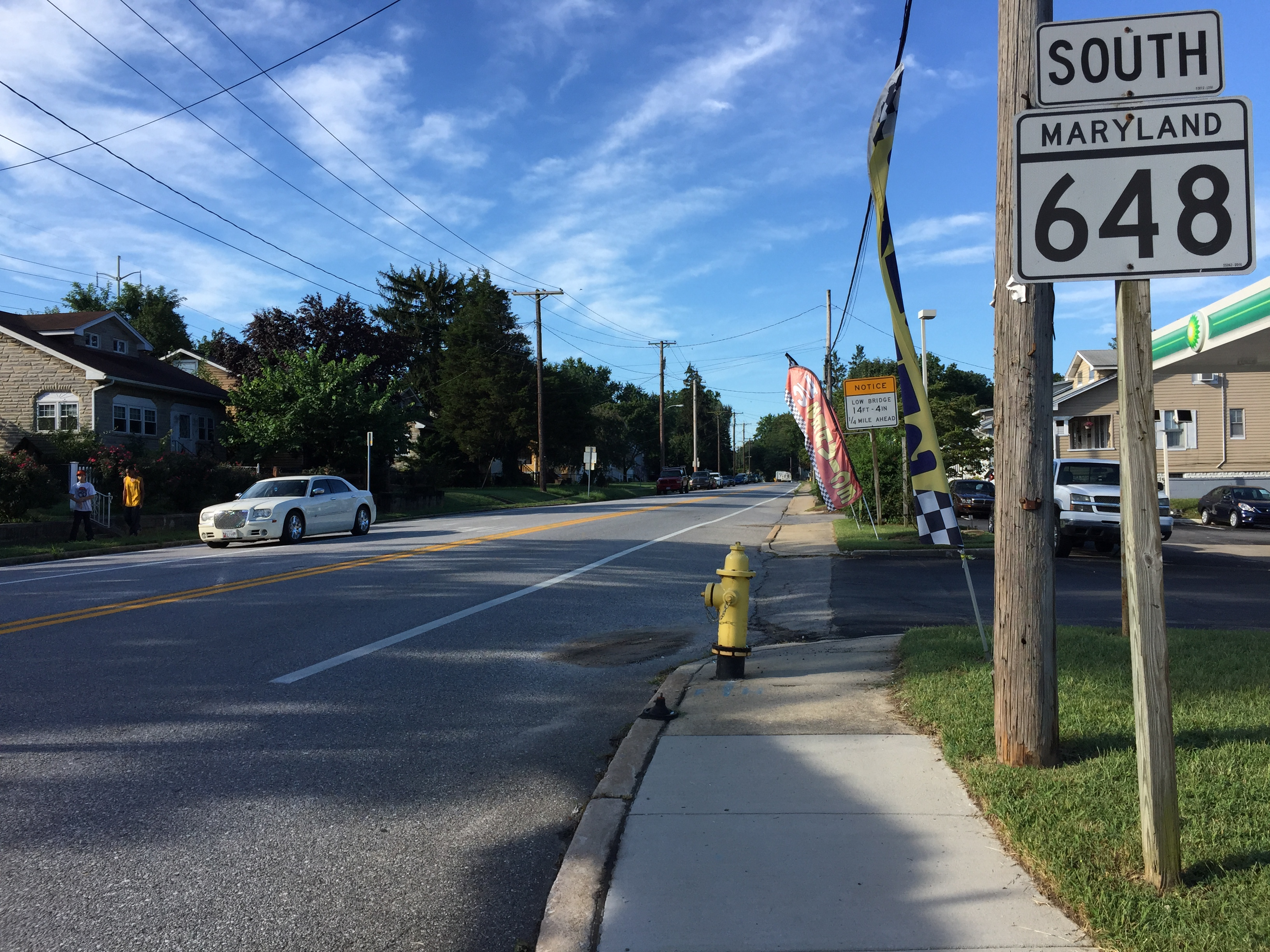
MD 648 southbound past MD 168 in Linthicum

The entire length of the Baltimore–Annapolis Boulevard was widened to 22 feet (6.7 m) with a pair of 3-foot (0.91 m) wide concrete shoulders by 1927. The highway's bridge over Marley Creek was rebuilt from a width of 16 feet (4.9 m) to 36 feet (11 m) in 1926. When the Maryland State Roads Commission first assigned numbers to state highways in 1927, the boulevard from Annapolis to Glen Burnie was designated MD 2, and the highway from Glen Burnie to Baltimore via Pumphrey was designated MD 3. In 1930, a concrete cut-off was built in Glen Burnie that allowed MD 2 traffic to bypass the community's central intersection to the northeast. By 1933, Russell Street was extended south from Bush Street to Waterview Avenue in Baltimore. MD 3 was relocated onto Russell Street from Annapolis Road, bypassing the Westport neighborhood, by 1936.

In 1934, the Maryland State Roads Commission recommended expanding Baltimore–Annapolis Boulevard to at least 30 feet (9.1 m) in width for its entire length, with a width of 40 feet (12 m) urged from MD 177 to MD 3 and on MD 2 from the center of Glen Burnie to Furnace Branch. The first portion of Governor Ritchie Highway was completed as a four-lane divided upgrade to existing MD 2 from the Baltimore city limit in Brooklyn Park to Furnace Branch in 1934 and 1935. Construction on the remainder of Governor Ritchie Highway began in 1936 and was completed south from Furnace Branch to the Severn River in 1938. All old segments of MD 2 were redesignated MD 648 by 1939. This includes the portion of Robert Crain Highway from Glen Burnie to Furnace Branch that is now the northern part of MD 3 Business. That same year, MD 3 was replaced by US 301 through Southern Maryland and along Baltimore–Annapolis Boulevard from Glen Burnie to Baltimore.

During World War II, the Waterford Road section of MD 648 was built as MD 706 and the Pumphrey grade separation with the defunct WB&A Railway was dismantled and the road widened. In 1949, the portion of MD 648 on Robert Crain Highway was widened and resurfaced, shortly before it was replaced with US 301 Alternate, which ran concurrently with MD 2 from Furnace Branch into Baltimore. US 301 proper was widened to 24 feet (7.3 m) from the Baltimore city limits to Pumphrey in 1950 and from Pumphrey to Glen Burnie in 1951. MD 648 was widened and resurfaced from US 301 in Glen Burnie south to MD 177 at Lipins Corner between 1954 and 1956. The Glen Burnie Bypass (now I-97) was completed in 1956. US 301 was moved from Baltimore–Annapolis Boulevard to the Glen Burnie Bypass, the Expressway Connector that would become the Baltimore Beltway, and the Baltimore–Washington Expressway (now MD 295) into the city of Baltimore in 1957, two years before the US 301 was relocated to the Eastern Shore of Maryland and replaced with MD 3. MD 648 was then extended from Glen Burnie through Pumphrey to its crossing of the Baltimore–Washington Expressway just north of the Baltimore city limits.

MD 648 replaced MD 706 on Waterford Road when MD 100 was completed in 1971; the old segments of MD 648 became MD 915. MD 648 was relocated as a four-lane divided highway at Marley Creek, including a new bridge over the creek, when the highway's interchange with MD 10 was built in 1976. By 1977, MD 648 had been extended north in Baltimore to its present northern terminus. The highway was expanded to a divided highway at its interchange with I-695 when the bridge over the Interstate was replaced in 1989. The southern end of what is now MD 648H was relocated in Severna Park to cross Cattail Creek and have a perpendicular intersection with MD 2 in 1989; the old alignment along Asbury Drive became MD 648AA. By 1999, the portions of Baltimore–Annapolis Boulevard between US 50 and MD 648D in Arnold had been transferred to county maintenance, and all segments of MD 648 existed as they do today.

== Junction lists ==
=== MD 648A and MD 648F ===
The entire route is in Anne Arundel County.

Location	mi	km	Destinations	Notes
Annapolis	0.00	0.00	MD 450 (Baltimore–Annapolis Boulevard/Governor Ritchie Highway) – Annapolis, Glen Burnie	Southern terminus of MD 648A
Annapolis	0.46	0.74	MD 672 east (Greenbury Point Road)	Western terminus of MD 672; MD 648 turns north to remain on Baltimore–Annapolis Boulevard
Annapolis	0.88	1.42	MD 179 east (Saint Margarets Road) / Sharpe Road	Western terminus of MD 179
Arnold	2.09	3.36	Dead end on south side of US 50 / US 301	Northern terminus of MD 648A
Arnold	0.00	0.00	US 50 west / US 301 south (Blue Star Memorial Highway) – Washington, Richmond	Southern terminus of MD 648F; right-in/right-out intersection
Arnold	0.61	0.98	MD 2 north (Governor Ritchie Highway) – Glen Burnie	Northern terminus of MD 648F; no access from northbound MD 648F to southbound MD 2
1.000 mi = 1.609 km; 1.000 km = 0.621 mi: Incomplete access

=== MD 648D ===
The entire route is in Anne Arundel County.

Location	mi	km	Destinations	Notes
Arnold	0.00	0.00	MD 2 (Governor Ritchie Highway) – Annapolis	Southern terminus of MD 648D
Arnold	1.85	2.98	MD 2 south (Governor Ritchie Highway) – Annapolis	Spur from MD 648D to southbound MD 2; no access to northbound MD 2
Severna Park	4.18	6.73	MD 2 (Governor Ritchie Highway) – Glen Burnie	Northern terminus of MD 648D
1.000 mi = 1.609 km; 1.000 km = 0.621 mi: Incomplete access

=== MD 648H ===
The entire route is in Anne Arundel County.

Location	mi	km	Destinations	Notes
Severna Park	0.00	0.00	MD 2 (Governor Ritchie Highway) / White Road west – Annapolis, Glen Burnie	Southern terminus of MD 648H
Pasadena	2.39	3.85	Baltimore–Annapolis Boulevard north	Unsigned MD 915; MD 648H continues on Waterford Road
Pasadena	3.49	5.62	MD 177 (Mountain Road) / Solley Road north – Jacobsville, Glen Burnie	Northern terminus of MD 648H
1.000 mi = 1.609 km; 1.000 km = 0.621 mi

=== MD 648E ===
County	Location	mi	km	Destinations	Notes
Anne Arundel	Pasadena	0.00	0.00	MD 177 (Mountain Road) / Jumpers Hole Road south – Jacobsville	Southern terminus of MD 648E
Anne Arundel	Glen Burnie	1.77	2.85	MD 270 north (Furnace Branch Road) / Baltimore–Annapolis Boulevard south	Southern terminus of MD 270; Baltimore–Annapolis Boulevard is unsigned MD 648G
Anne Arundel	Glen Burnie	1.99	3.20	MD 10 (Arundel Expressway) – Baltimore, Pasadena	Partial cloverleaf interchange
Anne Arundel	Glen Burnie	3.07	4.94	MD 2 (Governor Ritchie Highway) – Brooklyn Park, Pasadena	
Anne Arundel	Glen Burnie	3.29	5.29	MD 3 Bus. (Robert Crain Highway)	
Anne Arundel	Glen Burnie	3.81	6.13	MD 176 west (Dorsey Road) / Eighth Avenue east – Dorsey	Eastern terminus of MD 176
Anne Arundel	Ferndale	4.29	6.90	I-97 – Baltimore, Bowie, Upper Marlboro	I-97 Exit 16
Anne Arundel	Ferndale	6.26	10.07	MD 169 west (Maple Road) – Linthicum Heights	Eastern terminus of MD 169
Anne Arundel	Ferndale	6.43	10.35	I-695 (Baltimore Beltway) – Towson, Key Bridge	I-695 Exit 5
Anne Arundel	Pumphrey	7.05	11.35	MD 170 (Belle Grove Road/Camp Meade Road) – Brooklyn Park, Linthicum	
Anne Arundel	Pumphrey	7.53	12.12	MD 168 west (Nursery Road) / Shenandoah Avenue east – Linthicum Heights	Eastern terminus of MD 168
Baltimore	No major junctions				
Baltimore City		9.47	15.24	Patapsco Avenue	
Baltimore City		10.15	16.33	MD 295 south (Baltimore–Washington Parkway) – Washington	
Baltimore City		10.31	16.59	Waterview Avenue east	MD 648 turns east at this intersection
Baltimore City		10.35	16.66	Waterview Avenue east	MD 648 turns north at this intersection
Baltimore City		11.15	17.94	MD 295 north (Russell Street) – Downtown Baltimore	Northern terminus of MD 648E; right-in/right-out interchange with ramp from northbound I-95 to northbound MD 295
1.000 mi = 1.609 km; 1.000 km = 0.621 mi: Incomplete access

== Auxiliary routes ==
- MD 648AB is the designation for the unnamed 0.10-mile (0.16 km) access road to Jonas Green Park. The park features the southern end of the Baltimore & Annapolis Trail, a rail trail that follows the abandoned right-of-way of the Baltimore & Annapolis Railroad from Annapolis to Glen Burnie.
- MD 648AA is the designation for Asbury Drive, a section of old alignment of MD 648 in Severna Park. The state highway runs 0.48 miles (0.77 km) from Leelyn Drive near MD 2's intersection with MD 648D north to MD 648H.
- MD 648G is the designation for Baltimore–Annapolis Boulevard, a 0.05-mile (0.080 km) service road in Glen Burnie. The highway heads south from the intersection of MD 648E and MD 270 to MD 648I (McGivney Way). In 2010, the section of MD 648G from MD 648I west to a dead end, which followed an old alignment of MD 648, was transferred to Anne Arundel County.
- MD 648I is the designation for McGivney Way, a 0.13-mile (0.21 km) section of old alignment that serves a Knights of Columbus hall at its eastern terminus, a dead end at Marley Creek. McGivney Way is named for Michael J. McGivney, the founder of the fraternal organization.
