= Maryland Route 168 =

State highway in Anne Arundel County, Maryland, U.S., known as Nursery Rd

Maryland Route 168
- Nursery Road
- Maryland Route 168 highlighted in red

Route information
- Maintained by MDSHA
- Length: 1.28 mi (2.06 km)
- Existed: 1929–present

Major junctions
- West end: Hammonds Ferry Road in Linthicum
- I-695 in Linthicum
- East end: MD 648 in Pumphrey

Location
- Country: United States
- State: Maryland
- Counties: Anne Arundel

Highway system
- Maryland highway system; Interstate; US; State; Scenic Byways
← MD 166	→ MD 169

Maryland Route 168 (MD 168) is a state highway in the U.S. state of Maryland. Known as Nursery Road, the highway runs 1.28 miles (2.06 km) from Hammonds Ferry Road in Linthicum east to MD 648 in Pumphrey in northern Anne Arundel County. MD 168 was built in the late 1920s.

== Route description ==
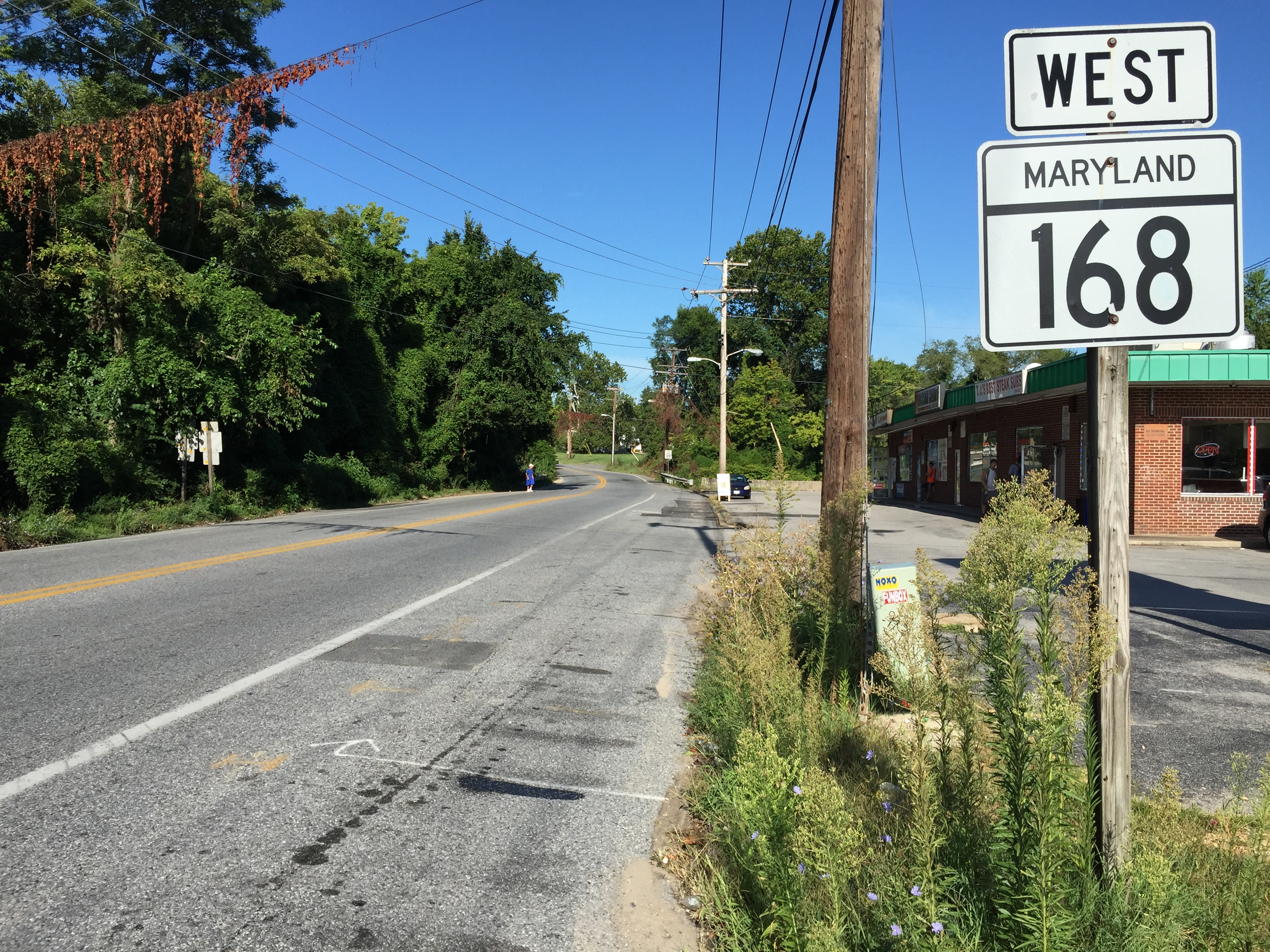
View west along MD 168 at MD 648 in Linthicum

MD 168 begins at an intersection with Hammonds Ferry Road in a mixed commercial and industrial area at the northern end of the unincorporated community of Linthicum. Access between MD 168 and eastbound Interstate 695 (I-695, Baltimore Beltway) is via the county highway between the state highway and the Patapsco River to the north. The west leg of the intersection is county-maintained West Nursery Road, which curves to the south, has a diamond interchange with MD 295 (Baltimore–Washington Parkway), and serves a business district near Baltimore/Washington International Thurgood Marshall Airport. MD 168 heads east as a two-lane undivided road that passes underneath I-695 and intersects Fairview Avenue, which is unsigned MD 969A and provides access to westbound I-695. The state highway enters a residential area after it crosses MD 295. MD 168 reaches its eastern terminus at its junction with MD 648 (Baltimore–Annapolis Boulevard) in Pumphrey. Nursery Road continues east into the parking lot for the Nursery Road station of MTA Maryland's Baltimore Light RailLink.

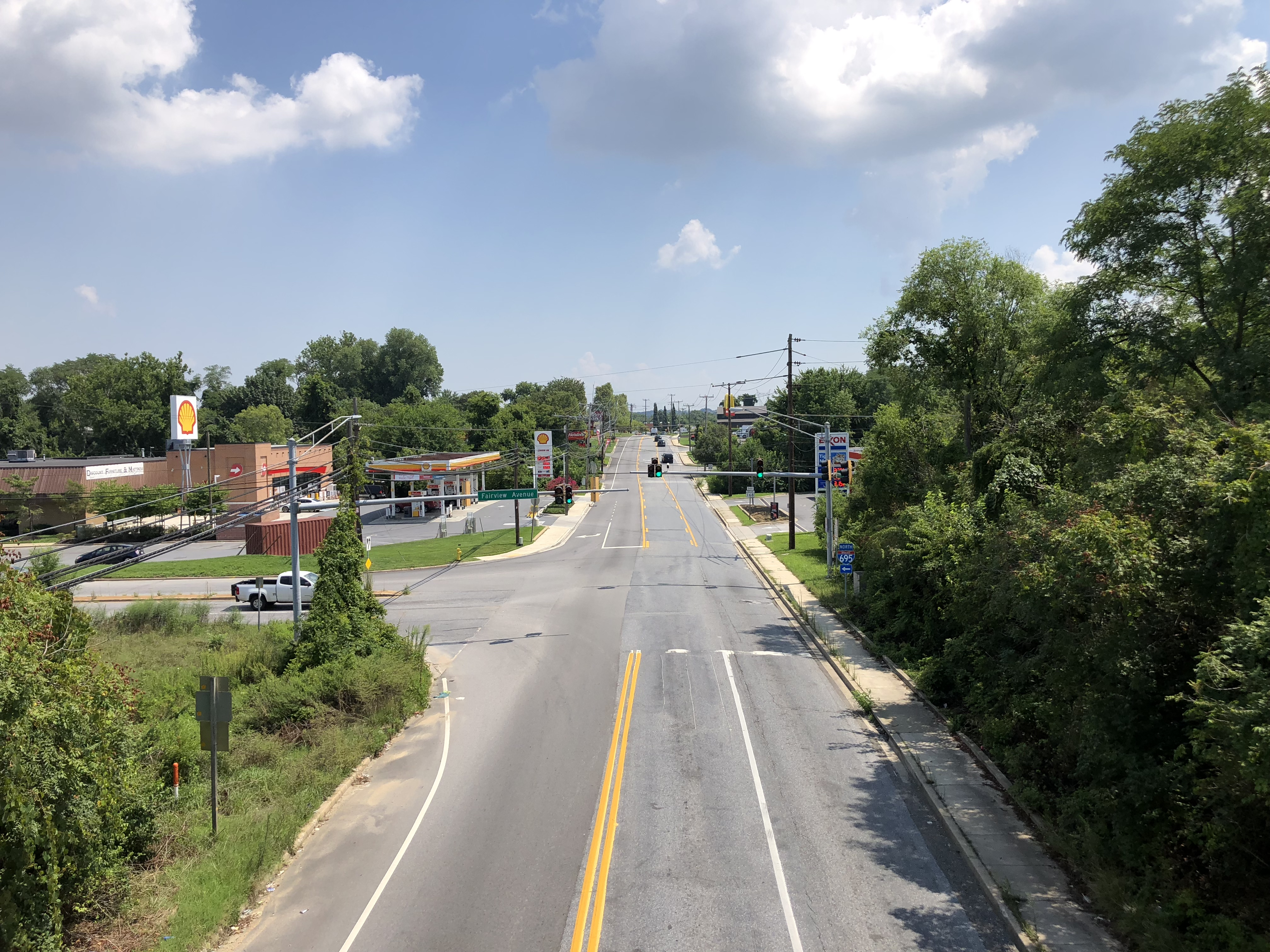
View east along MD 168 from I-695 in Linthicum

== History ==
MD 168 was paved in concrete in 1929 from Hammonds Ferry Road—which was built contemporaneously and was designated MD 167—to the Baltimore–Annapolis Boulevard, which was then part of MD 3.

== Junction list ==
The entire route is in Anne Arundel County.

Location	mi	km	Destinations	Notes
Linthicum	0.00	0.00	West Nursery Road / Hammonds Ferry Road to I-695 east	Western terminus
Linthicum	0.21	0.34	Fairview Avenue to I-695 west	Fairview Avenue is unsigned MD 969A
Pumphrey	1.28	2.06	MD 648 (Baltimore–Annapolis Boulevard) – Ferndale, Baltimore Highlands	Eastern terminus; officially MD 648E
1.000 mi = 1.609 km; 1.000 km = 0.621 mi
