= Zhecho Stankov =

Bulgarian politician (born 1982)

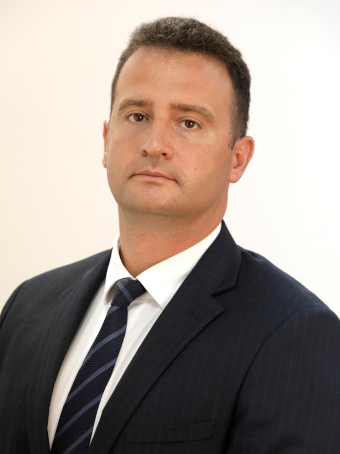
- Stankov in 2021

Minister of Energy
- Incumbent
- Assumed office 16 January 2025
- Prime Minister: Rosen Zhelyazkov
- Preceded by: Vladimir Malinov

Member of the National Assembly
- Incumbent
- Assumed office 21 July 2021
- Constituency: Burgas
- In office 19 April 2017 – 5 May 2017
- Succeeded by: Galya Zhelyazkova
- Constituency: Burgas

Personal details
- Born: 4 August 1982 (age 43)
- Party: GERB
- Parent: Doncho Zhekov (father)

Zhecho Donchev Stankov (Bulgarian: Жечо Дончев Станков; born 4 August 1982) is a Bulgarian politician of GERB. He has been a member of the National Assembly since 2021, having previously served in 2017. From 2015 to 2021, he served as deputy minister of energy. He is the son of Doncho Zhekov.
