= Lloyd Keaser =

American wrestler (born 1950)

Personal information
- Full name: Lloyd Weldon Keaser
- Nickname: Butch
- Born: February 9, 1950 (age 76) Pumphrey, Maryland, U.S.

Sport
- Country: United States
- Sport: Wrestling
- Events: Freestyle and Folkstyle
- College team: Navy
- Team: USA
Medal record
Men's freestyle wrestling
Representing United States
Olympic Games
Silver medal – second place	1976 Montreal	68 kg
World Championships
Gold medal – first place	1973 Tehran	68 kg
Pan American Games
Gold medal – first place	1975 Mexico City	68 kg
Collegiate Wrestling
Representing the Navy Midshipmen
NCAA Division I Championships
Bronze medal – third place	1972 College Park	142 lb

Lloyd Weldon Keaser (born February 9, 1950) is an American former wrestler who competed in the 1976 Summer Olympics for the United States in freestyle wrestling. In 1973, he won a gold medal at the World Championships and became the first African American to achieve this honor.

== Wrestling career ==
Keaser was born in Pumphrey, Maryland. He wrestled for the United States Naval Academy and was a two-time NCAA All American, placing fourth as junior and third as a senior. He was an alternate on the 1972 USA Olympic team to Dan Gable. In 1973, he won a gold medal at the World Championships and became the first African American to achieve this honor. In 1976, he won the silver medal at the Montreal Olympics in freestyle wrestling. Keaser is now the wrestling coach at Wilde Lake High School in Columbia, Maryland.

In 1996, Keaser was inducted into the National Wrestling Hall of Fame as a Distinguished Member.

== Bibliography ==
- Moffat, James V. 2007. Wrestlers At The Trials. Exit Zero Publishing. ISBN 978-0-9799051-0-0
- Hammond, Jairus K. & Little, Lisa. 2008. The African American Wrestling Experience. National Wrestling Hall of Fame and Museum
- Moore, Roger. 2009. Glory Beyond the Sport: Wrestling and the Military. National Wrestling Hall of Fame and Museum
