= Rami Miron =

Israeli former Olympic wrestler

Personal information
- Native name: רמי מירון
- Born: January 17, 1957 (age 69) Baku, Azerbaijan, Soviet Union

Sport
- Country: Israel
- Sport: Weightlifting
- Weight class: Lightweight
- Event: Freestyle

Rami Miron (Hebrew: רמי מירון; also "Meron"; born January 17, 1957) is an Israeli former Olympic wrestler.

== Early life ==
Miron is Jewish, and was born in Baku in Azerbaijan in the Soviet Union. He made aliyah (immigrated to Israel) from Russia in the Soviet Union.

== Wrestling career ==
In 1975, as a lightweight, Miron finished 6th in the World Youth Championships, and 7th in the World Championships. He also won a gold medal in the 1975 Tel Aviv International Wrestling Tournament, and was awarded the "Sportsman of the Year" award by the Israeli newspaper Maariv.

Miron competed for Israel at the 1976 Summer Olympics in Montreal, Canada, at the age of 19, in Wrestling--Men's Lightweight, Freestyle. He came in 7th. He defeated Ronald Joseph of the US Virgin Islands, Lennart Lundell of Sweden, and Zsigmond Kelevitz of Australia, while losing to János Kocsis of Hungary and in the quarter-finals to gold medal winner Pavel Pinigin of the Soviet Union. When he competed in the Olympics, he was 5 ft 6.5 in (168.9 cm) tall, and weighed 150 lb (68 kg).

In 1977, Miron finished 4th at the World Championships.
