= Övermark =

Surname list

Övermark is a surname. Notable people with the surname include:

- Jarmo Övermark (born 1955), Finnish wrestler
- Kari Övermark (born 1956), Finnish wrestler

== See also ==
- Overmars
