= Galya Zhelyazkova =

Bulgarian politician (born 1988)

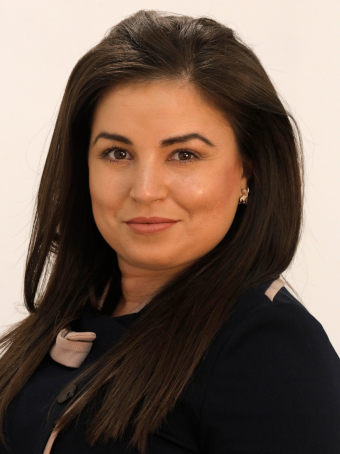
- Zhelyazkova in 2021

Member of the National Assembly
- Incumbent
- Assumed office 21 July 2021
- Constituency: Burgas
- In office 10 May 2017 – 26 March 2021
- Preceded by: Zhecho Stankov
- Constituency: Burgas

Personal details
- Born: Galya Stoyanova Vasilevа; 18 May 1988 (age 37)
- Party: GERB

Galya Stoyanova Zhelyazkova (Bulgarian: Галя Стоянова Желязкова; born 18 May 1988) is a Bulgarian politician. She has been a member of the National Assembly since 2021, having previously served from 2017 to 2021. From 2011 to 2017, she was a municipal councillor of Burgas. She was a co-founder of GERB in 2006.
