= Pinigin =

Pinigin (Russian: Пинигин) is a Russian masculine surname, its feminine counterpart is Pinigina. It may refer to:

- Mariya Pinigina (born 1958), Russian sprinter
- Pavel Pinigin (born 1953), Russian wrestler
- 7976 Pinigin, the asteroid
