= Yehuda Maayan =

Israeli sailor

Personal information
- Native name: יהודה מעין
- Nationality: Israel
- Born: April 19, 1955 (age 71) Israel
- Height: 5 ft 10 in (178 cm)
- Weight: 176 lb (80 kg)

Sailing career
- Sport: Sailing
- Class: Mixed Two-Person Heavyweight Dinghy

Yehuda Maayan (Hebrew: יהודה מעין; also Mayan; born April 19, 1955) is an Israeli former Olympic competitive sailor, and Chairman of the Israel Sailing Association.

== Sailing career ==
When Maayan competed in the Olympics he was 5 feet 10 inches (178 cm) tall, and weighed 176 pounds (80 kg).

Maayan competed for Israel at the 1976 Summer Olympics with Yoel Sela, at the age of 21, in Montreal, Canada, in Sailing - Mixed Two Person Heavyweight Dinghy, and came in 17th.

== Israel Sailing Association ==
Maayan became Chairman of the Israel Sailing Association in 1992. In 1993, he established a women's team, with Shani Kedmi and Anat Fabrikant, who went on to finish 12th at representing Israel at the 1996 Summer Olympics and 4th representing Israel at the 2000 Summer Olympics.
