= Yoel Sela =

Israeli sailor

Personal information
- Native name: יואל סלע
- Nationality: Israel
- Born: June 10, 1951 (age 75) Hadera, Israel
- Height: 5 ft 7 in (170 cm)
- Weight: 168 lb (76 kg)

Sailing career
- Sport: Sailing
- Class: Mixed Two Person Heavyweight Dinghy

Yoel Sela (Hebrew: יואל סלע; born June 10, 1951) is an Israeli Olympic competitive sailor. He was born in Hadera, Israel, and is Jewish.

== Sailing career ==
When Sela competed in the Olympics he was 5 ft 7 in (170 cm) tall, and weighed 168 lb (76 kg).

Sela competed for Israel at the 1976 Summer Olympics with Yehuda Maayan, at the age of 25, in Montréal, Canada, in Sailing – Mixed Two Person Heavyweight Dinghy, and came in 17th. He competed for Israel at the 1984 Summer Olympics with Eldad Amir, at the age of 33, in Los Angeles, California, in Sailing – Mixed Two Person Heavyweight Dinghy, and came in 8th.

Sela competed for Israel at the 1988 Summer Olympics with Eldad Amir, at the age of 37, in Seoul, Korea, in Sailing – Mixed Two Person Heavyweight Dinghy, and came in 4th. They came very close to winning the first Olympic medal in Israeli history, missing one by 11.30 points. Their second race fell on Yom Kippur, and Israeli officials forbade them from competing that day, so they had missed that race. Had they been able to compete in the second race, they would have certainly medaled.

In 1990, Sela and Amir came in 5th in the World Championships. In 1991, they won the Italian Open and came in second in the France Open.

Sela competed for Israel at the 1992 Summer Olympics with Eldad Amir, at the age of 41, in Barcelona, Spain, in Sailing – Mixed Two Person Heavyweight Dinghy, and came in 20th.
