= Mehmet Sarı =

Turkish wrestler (born 1948)

Personal information
- Nationality: Turkish
- Born: 29 January 1948 (age 78) Tarsus, Turkey

Sport
- Sport: Wrestling

Mehmet Sarı (born 29 January 1948) is a Turkish wrestler. He competed in the men's freestyle 68 kg at the 1976 Summer Olympics.

== Early life and education ==
Born in 1961 in the Taşova district of Amasya, Sarı completed his primary, secondary, and high school education in Amasya. He was introduced to commerce while working with his father in the market.

He passed the free boarding exam in 1973 and entered Amasya Imam Hatip High School. Sarı was the President of the Ülkü Ocakları between 1978-1980.

He graduated from the Business Administration Department of Eskişehir Anadolu University.

== Business career ==
Sarı started his career at İhlas Holding, working in various managerial positions at Türkiye newspaper. He played a role in the establishment of TGRT. Later, he worked as a manager at İhlas Food. He retired in 2002 and continued his business life by establishing his own business.

== Political career ==
Sarı, who was a candidate for Amasya deputy in 2015, was elected Mayor of Amasya in the local elections of March 31, 2019, and received his mandate on April 3, 2019. Mehmet Sarı resigned on March 16, 2023, to run for parliament.

== Personal life ==
He is married and a father of three children.
