= Eduard Weitz =

Israeli weightlifter

Personal information
- Native name: אדוארד וייץ
- Born: April 16, 1946 (age 79); Chernihiv, Soviet Union
- Height: 5 ft 2.5 in (159 cm)
- Weight: 130 lb (59 kg)

Sport
- Country: Israel
- Sport: Weightlifting
- Weight class: Men's Featherweight

Eduard Weitz (Hebrew: אדוארד וייץ; also "Edward"; born April 16, 1946) is an Israeli former Olympic weightlifter.

Weitz was born in Chernihiv, in the Soviet Union. He was ranked in the top 5 in the Soviet Union, before he made aliyah (emigrated) to Israel in 1974.

== Career ==
He competed for Israel at the 1976 Summer Olympics in Montreal, Quebec, Canada, in Weightlifting—Men's Featherweight. Weitz placed 5th, with a combined lift of 578.7 pounds (262.5 kg; 110.0 kg in the snatch, and 152.5 kg in the clean and jerk), behind the bronze medalist Kazumasa Hirai of Japan's combined lift of 275.0 kg. It was then the closest Israel had ever come to winning an Olympic medal. At the time, he was 5 ft 2.5 in (159 cm) tall, and weighed 130 lb (59 kg).

Weitz won the gold medal in the featherweight division at the 1976 Asian Games, with a combined lift of 260 kg. He was Israel's Sportsman of the Year that year.

In 1998, Weitz was honored as one of the top 50 athletes in Israel's history.
