= Overmars =

Overmars is a surname. Notable people with the surname include:

- Mark Overmars (born 1958), Dutch computer scientist and the creator of Game Maker
- Marc Overmars (born 1973), Dutch football player

== See also ==
- Övermark
