= Rafael González (wrestler) =

Puerto Rican wrestler

Personal information
- Nationality: Puerto Rican
- Born: 2 August 1956 (age 69)

Sport
- Sport: Wrestling

Rafael González (born 2 August 1956) is a Puerto Rican wrestler. He competed in the men's freestyle 68 kg at the 1976 Summer Olympics.
