= Linthicum Heights Historic District =

Historic district in Maryland, United States

- U.S. National Register of Historic Places
- U.S. Historic district
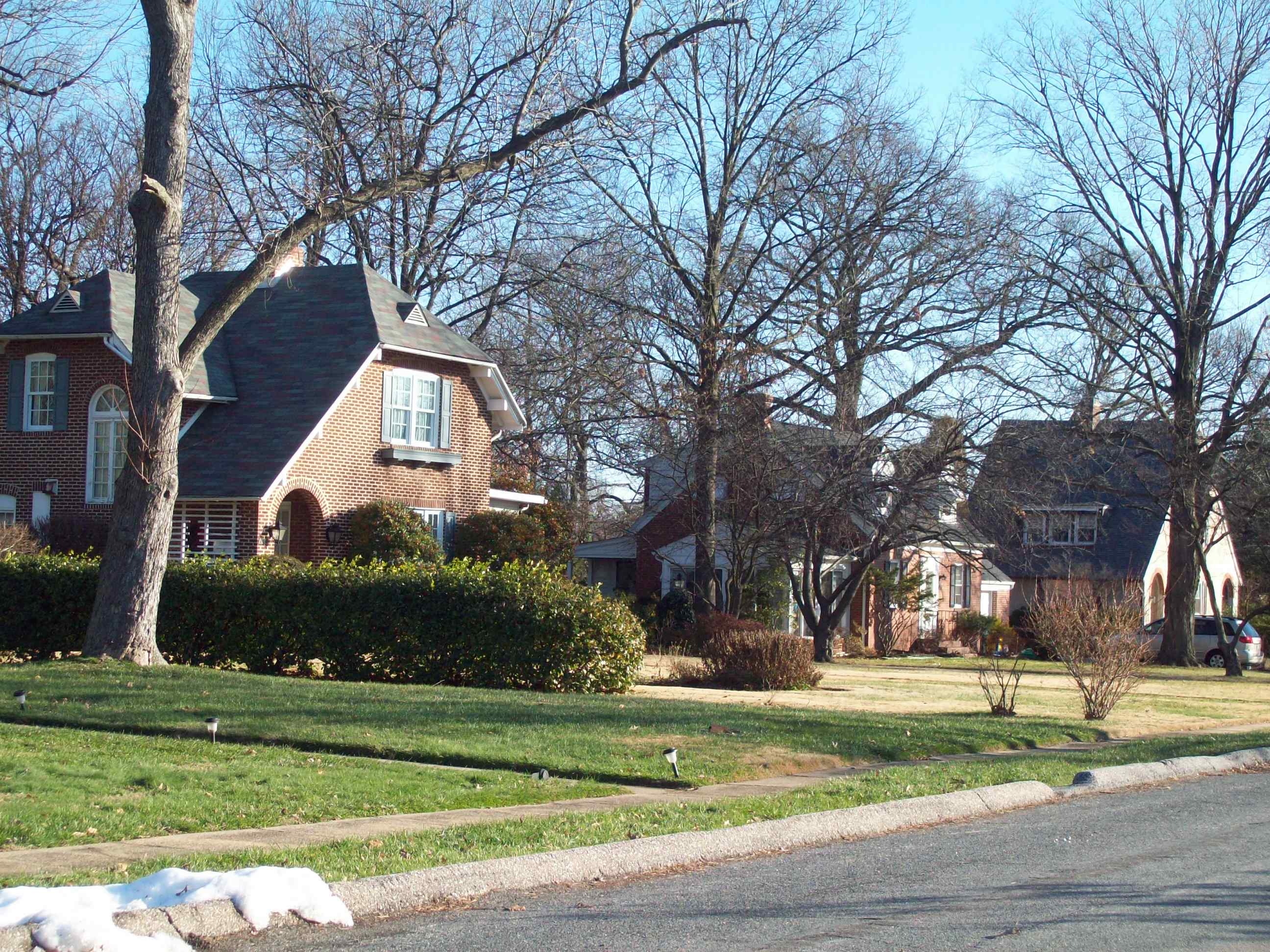
- Streetscape in Linthicum Heights Historic District, December 2009

- Location within Maryland Location within the United States
- Nearest city: Linthicum, Maryland
- Coordinates: 39°12′22″N 76°39′17″W
- Area: 166 acres (67 ha)
- Built: 1908
- Architectural style: Bungalow/Craftsman, Late 19th And 20th Century Revivals
- NRHP reference No.: 06000451
- Added to NRHP: May 31, 2006

Linthicum Heights Historic District is a national historic district at Linthicum Heights, Anne Arundel County, Maryland. It consists of a suburban community surrounding the intersection of Camp Meade Road (MD 170) and Maple Road. The community is situated on a series of low hills about three miles south of the Patapsco River and includes 17 tree-shaded streets created originally as a planned railroad suburb on the lines connecting Baltimore, Annapolis, and Washington, beginning in 1908. The district consists of 254 contributing resources, including two churches, a cemetery, and a former commercial/residential building. Most of the housing was built prior to 1939 and include examples of the Bungalow, American Foursquare, Colonial Revival, Dutch Revival, and Tudor Revival styles.

It was listed on the National Register of Historic Places in 2006.

== Gallery ==
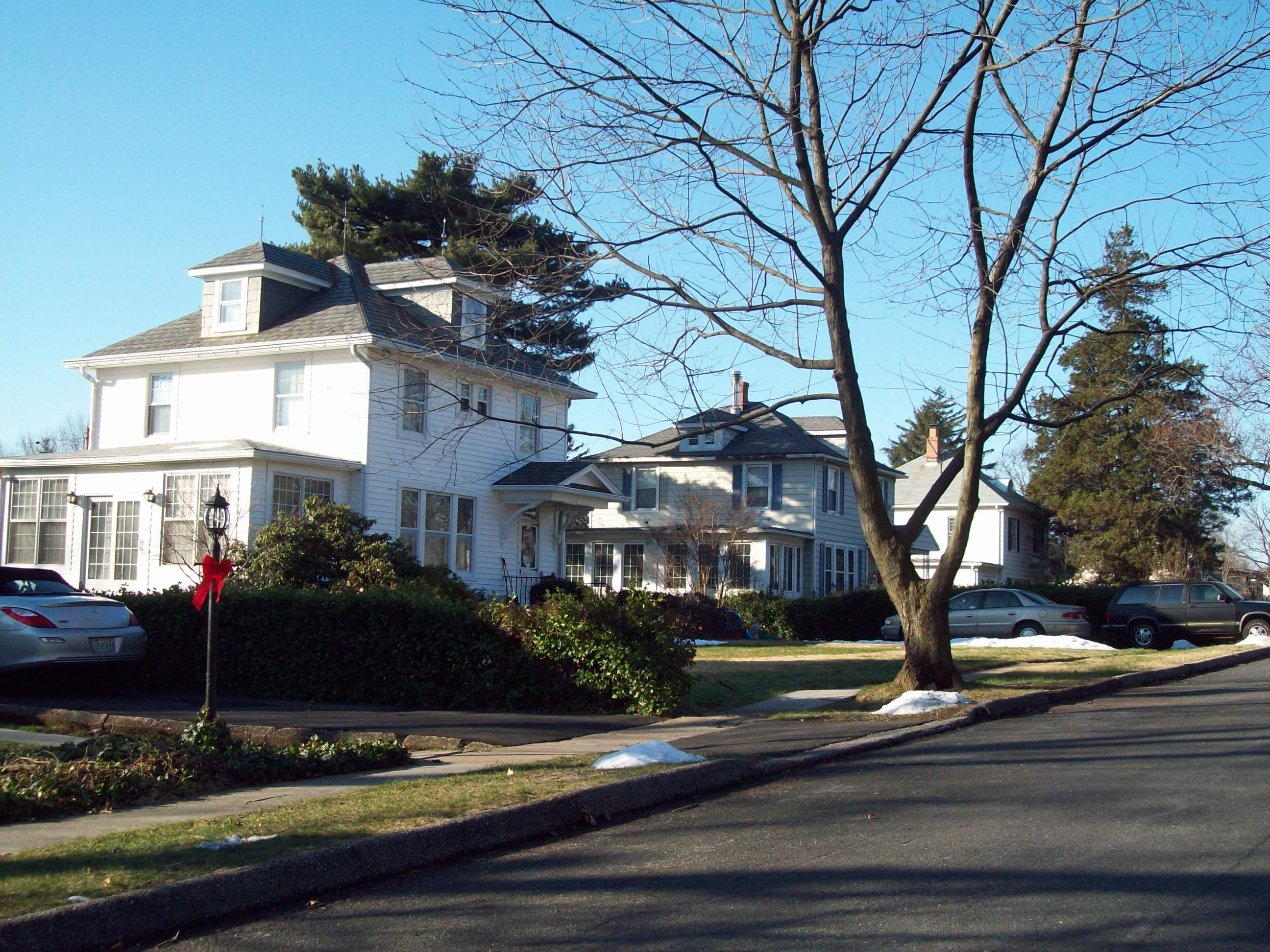
Streetscape in Linthicum Heights Historic District, December 2009
