= Doncho Zhekov =

Bulgarian wrestler

Personal information
- Nationality: Bulgarian
- Born: 1 August 1952 (age 73) Burgas, Bulgaria
- Children: Zhecho Stankov

Sport
- Sport: Wrestling

Doncho Zhekov (born 1 August 1952) is a Bulgarian wrestler. He competed in the men's freestyle 68 kg at the 1976 Summer Olympics.
