= Yasaburo Sugawara =

Japanese wrestler (born 1952)

Medal record

Men's freestyle wrestling

Representing Japan

Olympic Games
Bronze medal – third place	1976 Montreal	lightweight

Yasaburo Sugawara (菅原 弥三郎, Sugawara Yasaburō; born 26 November 1952) is a Japanese former wrestler who competed in the 1976 Summer Olympics.
