= János Kocsis =

Hungarian wrestler (1951–2025)

Personal information
- Nationality: Hungarian
- Born: 3 February 1951; Budapest, Hungary
- Died: 20 April 2025 (aged 74)

Sport
- Sport: Wrestling

János Kocsis (16 February 1951 – 20 April 2025) was a Hungarian wrestler. He competed at the 1976 Summer Olympics and the 1980 Summer Olympics. Kocsis died on 20 April 2025, at the age of 74.
