= Sergio Fiszman =

Argentine wrestler

Personal information
- Nationality: Argentine
- Born: 17 October 1955 (age 69)

Sport
- Sport: Wrestling

Sergio Fiszman (born 17 October 1955) is an Argentine former wrestler. He competed in two events at the 1976 Summer Olympics.
