= Brooklyn Park, Maryland =

- Census-designated place
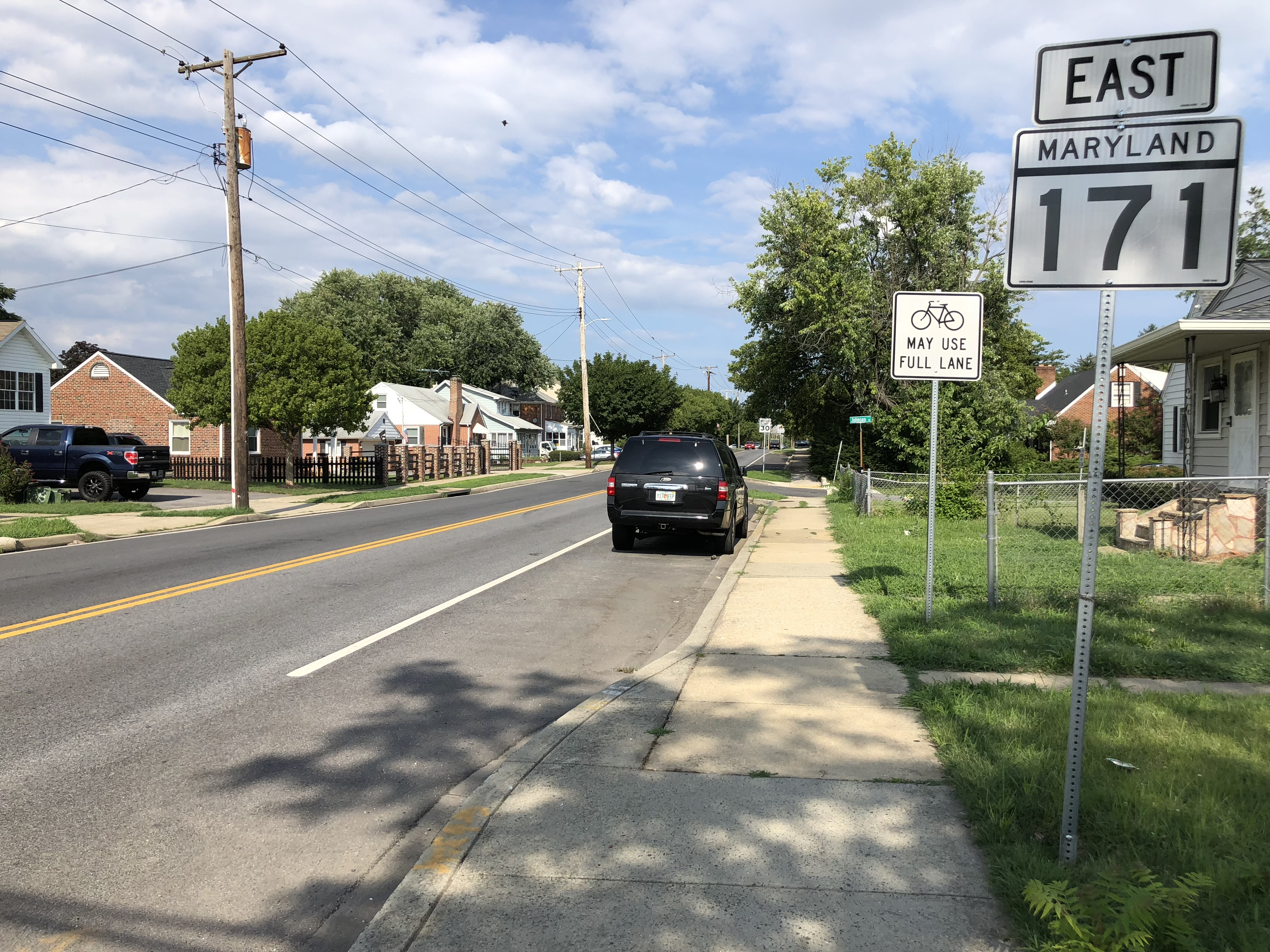
- View east along Maryland State Route 171 (Church Street) at Maryland State Route 2 (Governor Ritchie Highway) in Brooklyn Park.

- Location of Brooklyn Park, Maryland
- Coordinates: 39°13′29″N 76°36′46″W
- Country: United States
- State: Maryland
- County: Anne Arundel

Area
  - Total: 4.27 sq mi (11.06 km^{2})
  - Land: 4.21 sq mi (10.91 km^{2})
  - Water: 0.058 sq mi (0.15 km^{2})
- Elevation: 112 ft (34 m)

Population (2020)
  - Total: 16,112
  - Density: 3,826.6/sq mi (1,477.44/km^{2})
- Time zone: UTC−5 (Eastern (EST))
  - Summer (DST): UTC−4 (EDT)
- FIPS code: 24-10475
- GNIS feature ID: 0589827

Brooklyn Park is a census-designated place (CDP) in Anne Arundel County, Maryland, United States. The population was 14,373 at the 2010 census, and 16,112 at the 2020 census.

== Geography ==
Brooklyn Park is located at 39°13′29″N 76°36′46″W (39.224857, −76.612655) on the northern edge of Anne Arundel County and borders the city of Baltimore along the latter's southern boundary of 1919. The CDP is bordered as well by Interstate 695 (the Baltimore Beltway) to the south, by Maryland Route 648 (Baltimore Annapolis Boulevard) to the west, and by the Patapsco River, which forms the Anne Arundel County/Baltimore County boundary, to the northwest.

According to the United States Census Bureau, the CDP has a total area of 4.3 square miles (11.1 km^{2}), of which 4.2 square miles (10.9 km^{2}) is land and 0.077 square miles (0.2 km^{2}), or 1.65%, is water, consisting largely of the Patapsco River and associated wetlands.

To the north of the CDP, are the older Baltimore city neighborhoods of Brooklyn (founded 1853), Curtis Bay (development proposed in 1874, buildings began in 1889), and several smaller communities that are now defunct: Fairfield, Masonville, Wagner's Point (also known as East Brooklyn), Arundel Cove, and Hawkins Point. To the northeast is the Baltimore County community of Baltimore Highlands, to the west is Linthicum, and to the south are Ferndale and Glen Burnie.

The Brooklyn Park CDP in Anne Arundel County is composed of several smaller neighborhoods: old Brooklyn Park (west of Gov. Ritchie Highway - Maryland Route 2), Brooklyn Heights (east of Gov. Ritchie Highway), Arundel Village (along and north of Church Street), Roland Terrace (along and south of Church Street), Arundel Gardens (southwest of Gov. Ritchie Highway and south of Hammonds Lane), and Pumphrey, which lies along Belle Grove Road, south of the Patapsco River.

A History of Brooklyn-Curtis Bay, of approximately 200 pages, was published in September 1976, in celebration of the American Bicentennial by the members of the Brooklyn-Curtis Bay Historical Committee.

== Demographics ==
Historical population
Census	Pop.	Note	%±
1970	13,896		—
1980	11,508		−17.2%
1990	10,987		−4.5%
2000	10,938		−0.4%
2010	14,373		31.4%
2020	16,112		12.1%

=== Racial and ethnic composition ===
Brooklyn Park CDP, Maryland – Racial and ethnic composition Note: the US Census treats Hispanic/Latino as an ethnic category. This table excludes Latinos from the racial categories and assigns them to a separate category. Hispanics/Latinos may be of any race.
Race / Ethnicity (NH = Non-Hispanic)	Pop 2000	Pop 2010	Pop 2020	% 2000	% 2010	% 2020
White alone (NH)	9,969	10,282	8,799	91.14%	71.54%	54.61%
Black or African American alone (NH)	458	2,362	3,332	4.19%	16.43%	20.68%
Native American or Alaska Native alone (NH)	51	50	62	0.47%	0.35%	0.38%
Asian alone (NH)	164	400	591	1.50%	2.78%	3.67%
Native Hawaiian or Pacific Islander alone (NH)	4	5	10	0.04%	0.03%	0.06%
Other race alone (NH)	19	18	72	0.17%	0.13%	0.45%
Mixed race or Multiracial (NH)	99	398	953	0.91%	2.77%	5.91%
Hispanic or Latino (any race)	174	858	2,293	1.59%	5.97%	14.23%
Total	10,938	14,373	16,112	100.00%	100.00%	100.00%

=== 2020 census ===
As of the 2020 census, Brooklyn Park had a population of 16,112. The median age was 37.0 years. 24.2% of residents were under the age of 18 and 14.2% of residents were 65 years of age or older. For every 100 females there were 96.3 males, and for every 100 females age 18 and over there were 93.8 males age 18 and over.

100.0% of residents lived in urban areas, while 0.0% lived in rural areas.

There were 5,596 households in Brooklyn Park, of which 34.8% had children under the age of 18 living in them. Of all households, 40.3% were married-couple households, 19.0% were households with a male householder and no spouse or partner present, and 30.8% were households with a female householder and no spouse or partner present. About 24.8% of all households were made up of individuals and 10.6% had someone living alone who was 65 years of age or older.

There were 5,926 housing units, of which 5.6% were vacant. The homeowner vacancy rate was 1.8% and the rental vacancy rate was 4.9%.

=== 2010 census ===
By the 2010 census, the local population had grown and changed substantially. In 2010 Brooklyn Park had 14,373 people, 5,158 households and 3,634 families. The racial makeup of the CDP was 76.8% White, 18.6% African American, 6% Latino, and 3.4% Asian (NB: some Latinos had responded as both Latino and white).

=== 2000 census ===
As of the census of 2000, there were 10,938 people, 4,093 households, and 2,910 families residing in the CDP. The population density was 3,701.0 inhabitants per square mile (1,429.0/km^{2}). There were 4,311 housing units at an average density of 1,458.7 per square mile (563.2/km^{2}). The racial makeup of the CDP was 92.15% White, 4.21% African American, 0.48% Native American, 1.50% Asian, 0.04% Pacific Islander, 0.58% from other races, and 1.05% from two or more races. Hispanic or Latino of any race were 1.59% of the population.

There were 4,093 households, out of which 30.6% had children under the age of 18 living with them, 50.2% were married couples living together, 15.1% had a female householder with no husband present, and 28.9% were non-families. 22.8% of all households were made up of individuals, and 11.2% had someone living alone who was 65 years of age or older. The average household size was 2.67 and the average family size was 3.10.

In the CDP, the population was spread out, with 24.9% under the age of 18, 8.0% from 18 to 24, 28.9% from 25 to 44, 22.2% from 45 to 64, and 16.0% who were 65 years of age or older. The median age was 38 years. For every 100 females, there were 94.8 males. For every 100 females age 18 and over, there were 90.5 males.

The median income for a household in the CDP was $42,207, and the median income for a family was $50,496. Males had a median income of $33,476 versus $26,316 for females. The per capita income for the CDP was $18,582. About 6.6% of families and 8.0% of the population were below the poverty line, including 13.5% of those under age 18 and 6.3% of those age 65 or over.

== See also ==
- Brooklyn, Baltimore
- Curtis Bay, Baltimore
