= Linthicum, Maryland =

- Census-designated place
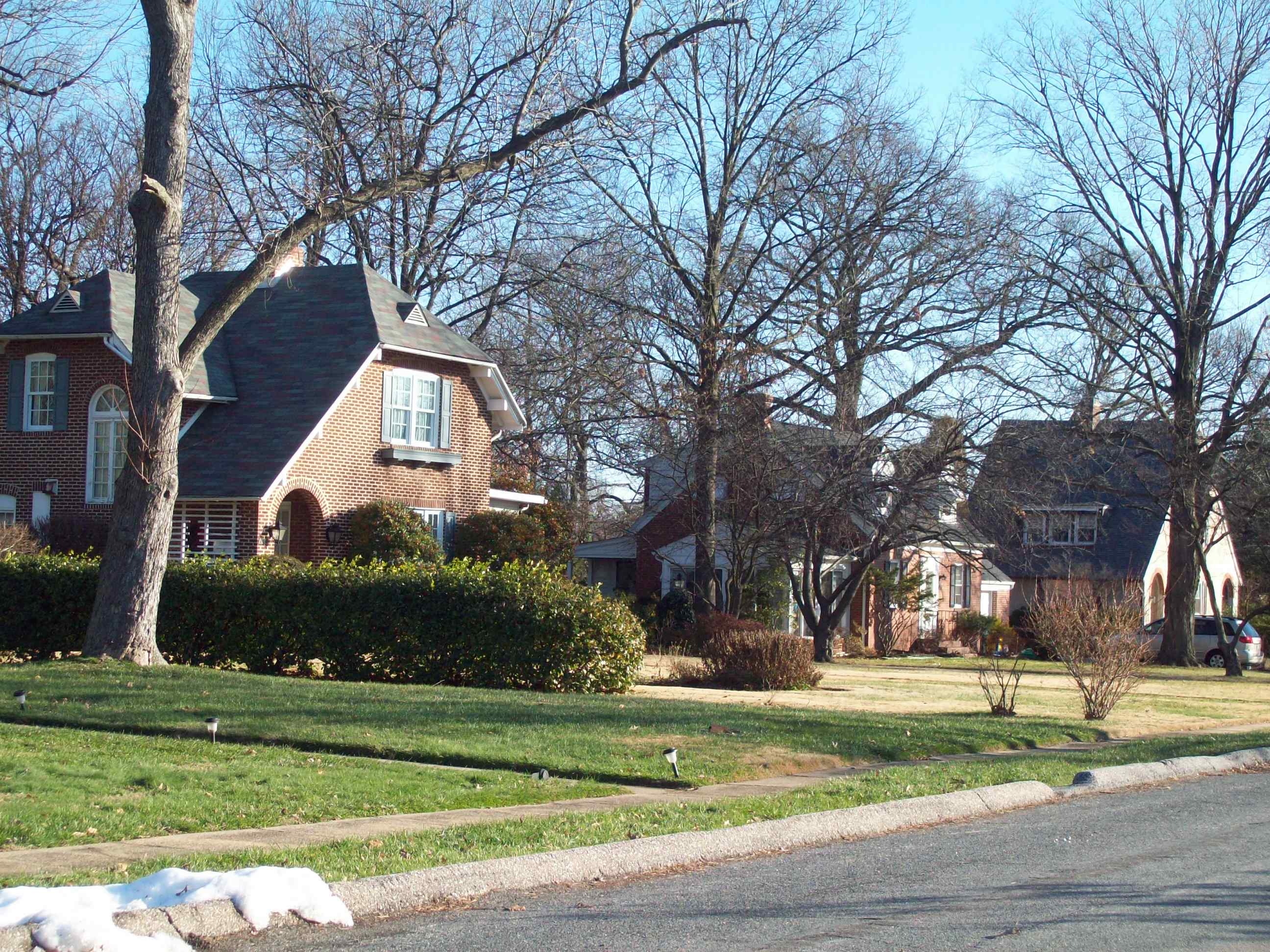
- A street in Historic Linthicum Heights

- Location of Linthicum, Maryland
- Coordinates: 39°12′14″N 76°39′38″W
- Country: United States
- State: Maryland
- County: Anne Arundel

Area
  - Total: 5.51 sq mi (14.26 km^{2})
  - Land: 5.46 sq mi (14.15 km^{2})
  - Water: 0.046 sq mi (0.12 km^{2})
- Elevation: 138 ft (42 m)

Population (2020)
  - Total: 11,190
  - Density: 2,048.6/sq mi (790.96/km^{2})
- Time zone: UTC−5 (Eastern (EST))
  - Summer (DST): UTC−4 (EDT)
- ZIP code: 21090
- Area code: 410
- FIPS code: 24-47125
- GNIS feature ID: 1710221

Linthicum is a census-designated place (CDP) and unincorporated community in Anne Arundel County, Maryland, United States. The population was 10,324 at the 2010 census. It is located directly north of Baltimore–Washington International Thurgood Marshall Airport (BWI). The location is designed "Linthicum Heights" by the U.S. Postal Service, with the zip code 21090.

Linthicum has been traditionally divided into two distinct communities, each with its own community association and identity. These two communities, split by the Baltimore Beltway in 1957, are Linthicum and North Linthicum (or, alternatively, Linthicum-Shipley and North Linthicum.) Both communities developed as a result of their locations adjacent to the Baltimore and Annapolis Short Line railroad which brought commuters to the original truck farming community.

As a developed community, Linthicum began with the 1908 founding of the "Linthicum Heights Company", though a "Linthicum" or "Linthicum's" station on the 1887 Annapolis and Baltimore Short Line railroad existed at least as early as 1889. The community's name was from the area's primary land-owning family since an 1801 purchase by Abner Linthicum.

The Linthicum Heights Historic District was listed on the National Register of Historic Places in 2006.

== Geography ==
Linthicum is located at 39°12′14″N 76°39′38″W (39.203876, −76.660506) in northern Anne Arundel County. It extends from the Patapsco River in the north (the Baltimore County line) to Maryland Route 170 (Aviation Boulevard) in the south, and from Interstate 195 in the west to Maryland Route 648 (Baltimore Annapolis Boulevard) in the east. It is bordered by the CDPs of Baltimore Highlands to the north (in Baltimore County), Brooklyn Park to the east, and Ferndale to the southeast, and by the Baltimore–Washington International Airport to the south.

The BWI Business District West Nursery area is located in Linthicum along the West Nursery Road corridor. The business district is home to numerous companies, offices, and commercial services.

Two major highways run through the CDP. The Baltimore Beltway (Interstate 695) runs northwest–southeast through Linthicum and intersects with the Baltimore–Washington Parkway (Maryland Route 295), which runs northeast–southwest. By the parkway it is 6 miles (10 km) northeast to downtown Baltimore and 32 miles (51 km) southwest to Washington, D.C.

According to the United States Census Bureau, the CDP has a total area of 5.5 square miles (14.3 km^{2}), of which 5.4 square miles (14.1 km^{2}) is land and 0.039 square miles (0.1 km^{2}), or 0.81%, is water.

== Demographics ==
Historical population
Census	Pop.	Note	%±
2000	7,539		—
2010	10,324		36.9%
2020	11,190		8.4%
U.S. Decennial Census

=== 2020 census ===
As of the 2020 census, Linthicum had a population of 11,190. The median age was 40.8 years. 20.2% of residents were under the age of 18 and 18.1% of residents were 65 years of age or older. For every 100 females there were 97.9 males, and for every 100 females age 18 and over there were 97.2 males age 18 and over.

100.0% of residents lived in urban areas, while 0.0% lived in rural areas.

There were 4,299 households in Linthicum, of which 29.5% had children under the age of 18 living in them. Of all households, 53.1% were married-couple households, 17.9% were households with a male householder and no spouse or partner present, and 21.8% were households with a female householder and no spouse or partner present. About 23.7% of all households were made up of individuals and 10.0% had someone living alone who was 65 years of age or older.

There were 4,511 housing units, of which 4.7% were vacant. The homeowner vacancy rate was 0.8% and the rental vacancy rate was 5.7%.

Racial composition as of the 2020 census
Race	Number	Percent
White	8,807	78.7%
Black or African American	701	6.3%
American Indian and Alaska Native	54	0.5%
Asian	601	5.4%
Native Hawaiian and Other Pacific Islander	21	0.2%
Some other race	284	2.5%
Two or more races	722	6.5%
Hispanic or Latino (of any race)	615	5.5%

=== 2000 census ===
As of the census of 2000, there were 7,539 people, 2,877 households, and 2,206 families residing in the CDP. The population density was 1,793.1 inhabitants per square mile (692.3/km^{2}). There were 2,950 housing units at an average density of 701.6 per square mile (270.9/km^{2}). The racial makeup of the CDP was 94.39% White, 1.76% African American, 0.24% Native American, 2.44% Asian, 0.15% Pacific Islander, 0.23% from other races, and 0.80% from two or more races. Hispanic or Latino of any race were 0.89% of the population.

There were 2,877 households, out of which 28.3% had children under the age of 18 living with them, 64.3% were married couples living together, 8.7% had a female householder with no husband present, and 23.3% were non-families. 19.5% of all households were made up of individuals, and 10.5% had someone living alone who was 65 years of age or older. The average household size was 2.61 and the average family size was 2.98.

In the CDP, the population was spread out, with 21.3% under the age of 18, 6.2% from 18 to 24, 25.5% from 25 to 44, 26.4% from 45 to 64, and 20.6% who were 65 years of age or older. The median age was 43 years. For every 100 females, there were 93.0 males. For every 100 females age 18 and over, there were 91.7 males.

The median income for a household in the CDP was $61,479, and the median income for a family was $72,821. Males had a median income of $46,586 versus $35,104 for females. The per capita income for the CDP was $27,559. About 2.0% of families and 3.6% of the population were below the poverty line, including 3.1% of those under age 18 and 7.8% of those age 65 or over.

== Economy ==
Ciena and Northrop Grumman Electronic Systems are among the companies based in Linthicum.

== Public transportation ==
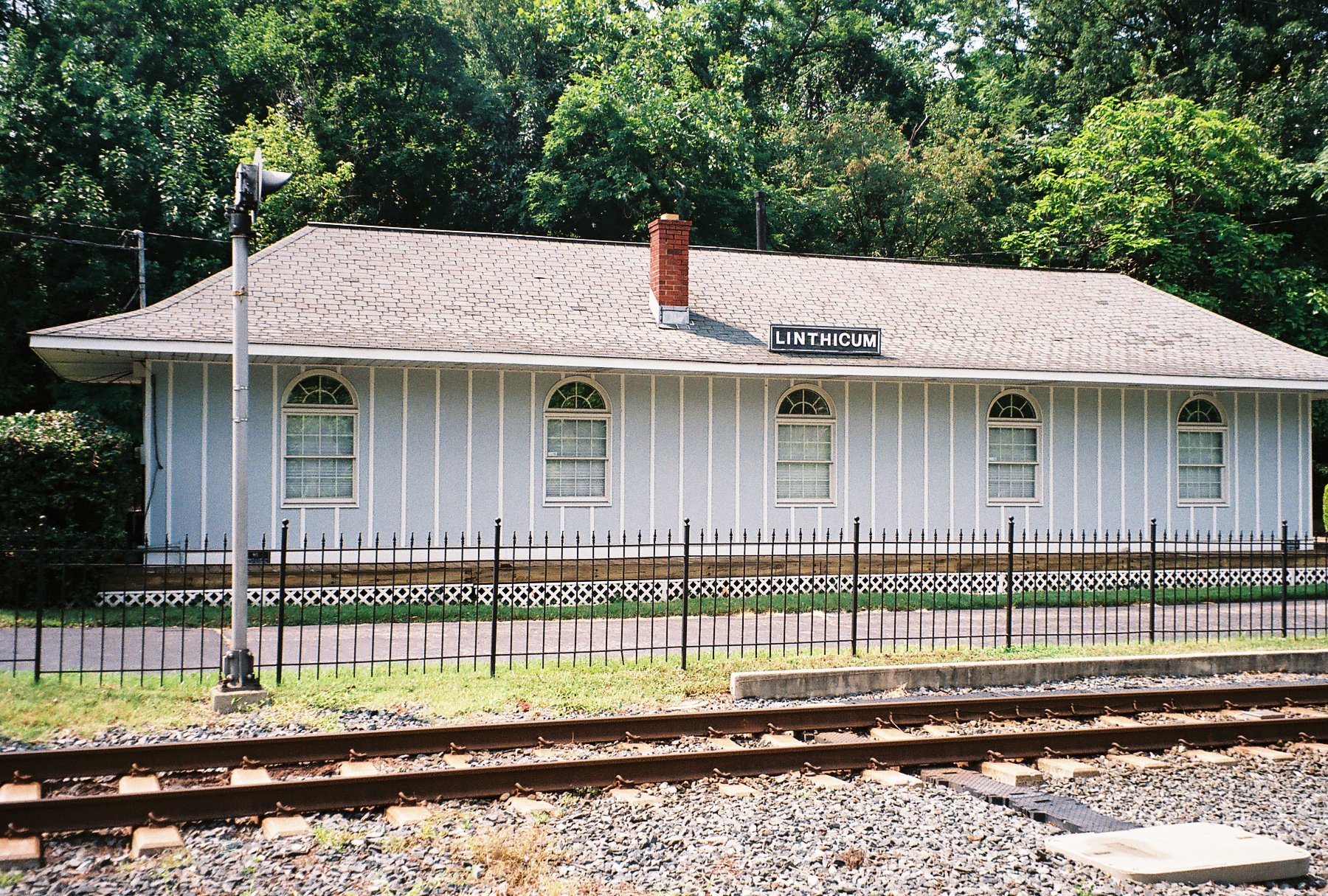
The former Linthicum Heights, Maryland (U.S.), station of the defunct Baltimore and Annapolis Railroad and its predecessor Washington, Baltimore and Annapolis Electric Railway, adjacent to the current tracks of the Maryland Transit Administration (MTA) Light Rail

Linthicum is served by buses and three stops on the Baltimore Light Rail:

- Nursery Road, 6825 Baltimore-Annapolis Boulevard
- North Linthicum, 450 N. Camp Meade Road, Linthicum Heights
- Linthicum, 308 S. Camp Meade Road, Linthicum Heights

From 1887 to February 1950, Linthicum was served by the now-defunct Baltimore and Annapolis Railroad's line between Baltimore and Annapolis, Maryland.

== North Linthicum ==
The community of North Linthicum is defined by the North Linthicum Improvement Association as the area bounded by the Patapsco River from the Baltimore Beltway (I-695) to Old Annapolis Road (MD 648), Old Annapolis Road from the Patapsco River to the Baltimore Beltway, the Baltimore Beltway from Old Annapolis Road to the Baltimore–Washington Parkway, the Baltimore–Washington Parkway from the Baltimore Beltway to Hammonds Ferry Road, and Hammonds Ferry Road from the Baltimore–Washington Parkway to the Patapsco River.

== Adjacent towns ==
- Glen Burnie
- Baltimore
- Hanover
- Elkridge

== Points of interest ==
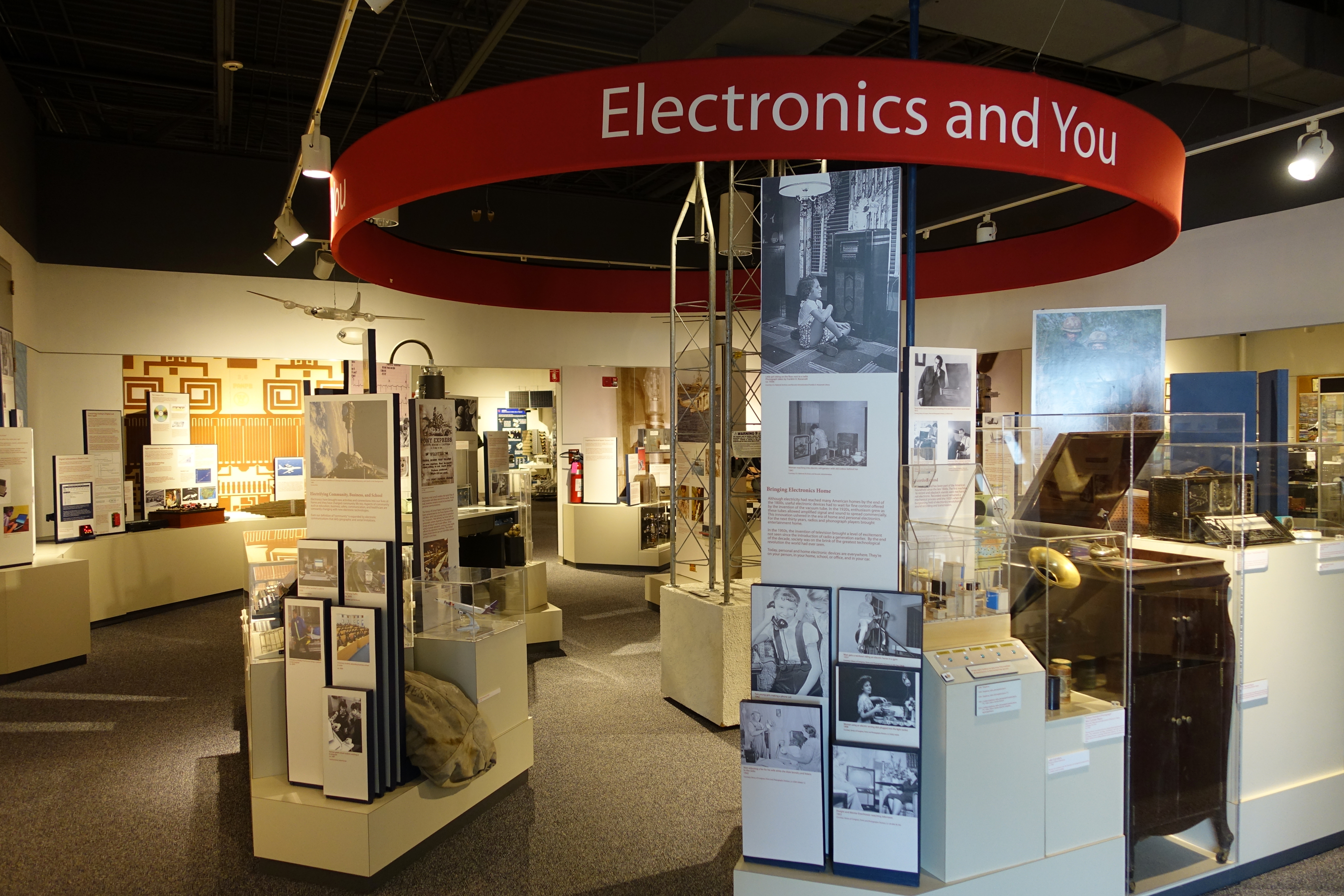
Interior of the National Electronics Museum

- National Electronics Museum
- William P. Didusch Center for Urologic History
- Benson-Hammond House
- Friendship Church of the Brethren
- Overlook Elementary School
- Linthicum Elementary School
- Lindale Middle School
- St. Philip Neri School
- Hutman Artistic "Environment", a library and car art studio
- The Performing Arts Association of Linthicum
- Holy Cross Antiochian Orthodox Church

== Notable people ==
- Rafael Alvarez (born 1958), journalist, author, television writer
- Helen Delich Bentley (1923–2017), U.S. congresswoman (1985–1995)
- Pamela Beidle (born 1958, date questionable), Member, Maryland State Senate (District 32) and Maryland House of Delegates (District 32)
- Diane Lynn Warren Black (born 1951), U.S. congresswoman (2011–2019), Tennessee General Assembly (1998–2010)
- Michael W. Burns (born 1958), Maryland House of Delegates member (1994–1998), administrative law judge and attorney
- Robert A. Costa (born 1958), Maryland House of Delegates member since 2003
- John C. Inglis (born 1954), National Security Agency Deputy Director (2006–2014)
- John Charles Linthicum (1867–1932), U.S. congressman (1911–1932)
- G. E. Lowman (1897–1965), national radio evangelist
- Dorothy Mays (born 1957), Playboy July 1979 Playmate of the Month
- Brian Knighton aka Axl Rotten was found dead in a McDonald's restroom near a motel in Linthicum in 2016.
- Donald E. Murphy (born 1960), Maryland House of Delegates member (1995–2003)
- Leonard T. "Max" Schroeder Jr. (1918–2009), U.S. Army colonel
- Jim Spencer (1947–2002), Major League Baseball player (1968–1982, 1973); Major League Baseball All-Star Game
