= Nursery Road station =

Baltimore Light Rail station in Pumphrey, Maryland, US

Nursery Road
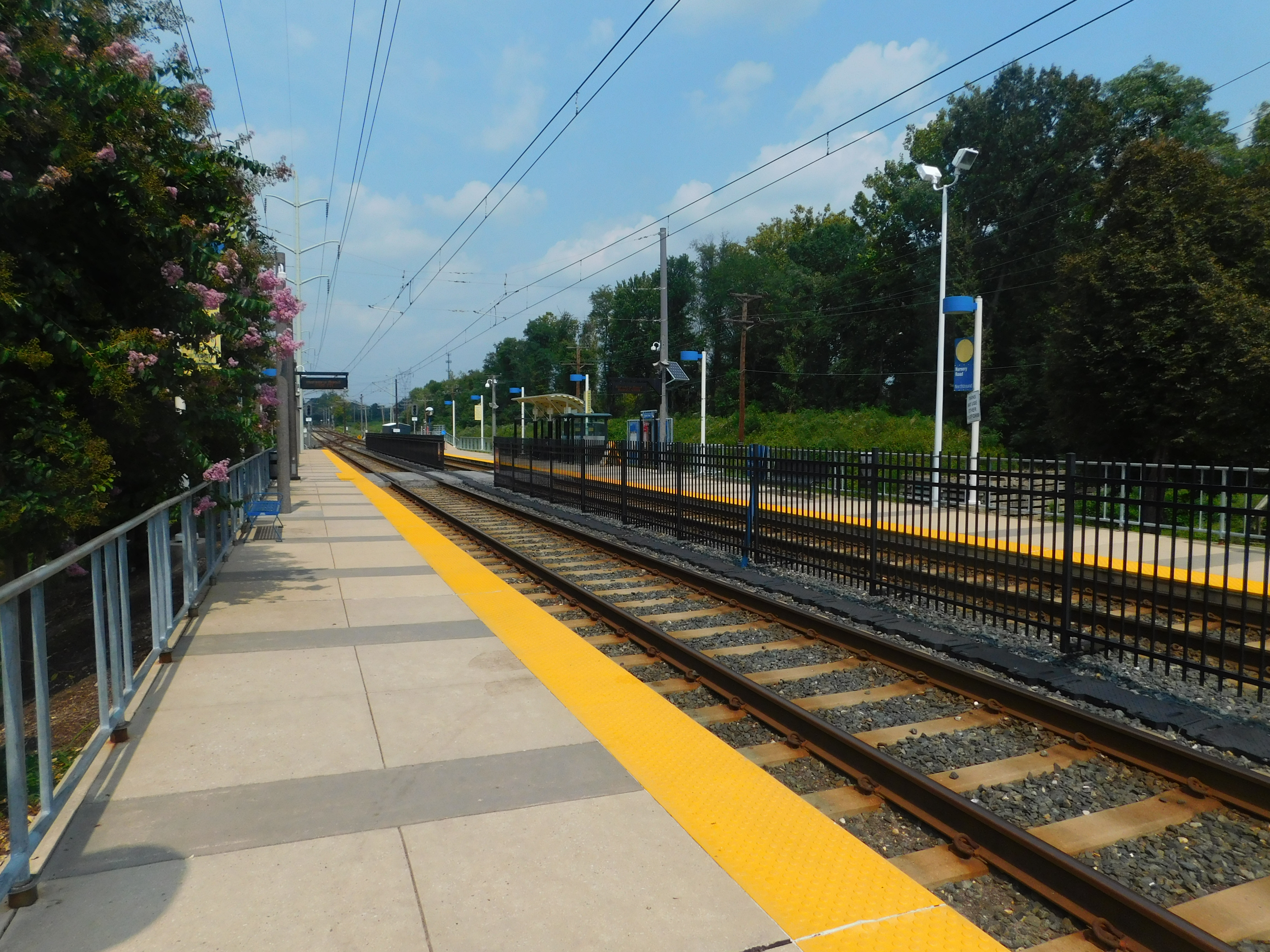
- The Nursery Road station in August 2018

General information
- Location: 6825 Baltimore-Annapolis Boulevard; Pumphrey, Maryland
- Coordinates: 39°13′17.6″N 76°38′29.1″W
- Owner: Maryland Transit Administration
- Platforms: 2 side platforms
- Tracks: 2
- Connections: 17

Construction
- Parking: 37 free spaces
- Accessible: Yes

History
- Opened: 1993

Passengers
- 2017: 427 daily

Services
Preceding station	Maryland Transit Administration	Following station
North Linthicum toward BWI Airport or Glen Burnie	Light RailLink	Baltimore Highlands toward Hunt Valley
Location

Nursery Road station is a Baltimore Light Rail station in Pumphrey, Maryland. There are 37 free parking spaces and connections can be made to MTA Maryland's Route 17 bus from here.

Though officially located at 6825 Baltimore-Annapolis Boulevard (MD 648) the actual location of the Nursery Road stop is at the corner of Nursery Road and South Old Annapolis Road. Nursery Road is designated Maryland Route 168 west of Baltimore & Annapolis Boulevard, and a local street east of Route 648.

== Station layout ==
G
G	Side platform, doors will open on the right
G	Southbound	← Light Rail toward BWI Airport or Glen Burnie (North Linthicum)
G	Northbound	Light Rail toward Fairgrounds or Hunt Valley (Baltimore Highlands) →
G	Side platform, doors will open on the right
G	Street level	Exit/entrance

== See also ==
- Washington, Baltimore and Annapolis Electric Railway (1908–1935) - Pumphrey Station
- Baltimore and Annapolis Railroad (1887–1980) - Pumphrey Station
