= Pumphrey, Maryland =

- Unincorporated community
- Location of Pumphrey, Maryland
- Coordinates: 39°12′55″N 76°38′23″W
- Country: United States
- State: Maryland
- County: Anne Arundel

Area
  - Total: 2.5 sq mi (6.6 km^{2})
  - Land: 2.4 sq mi (6.3 km^{2})
  - Water: 0.12 sq mi (0.3 km^{2})
- Elevation: 69 ft (21 m)

Population (2000)
  - Total: 5,317
  - Density: 2,181/sq mi (841.9/km^{2})
- Time zone: UTC−5 (Eastern (EST))
  - Summer (DST): UTC−4 (EDT)
- FIPS code: 24-64250
- GNIS feature ID: 0591081

Pumphrey is an unincorporated community and former census-designated place (CDP) in Anne Arundel County, Maryland, United States. At the 2000 census, the population was 5,317. It was split between the Linthicum and Brooklyn Park CDPs for the 2010 census.

== History ==
According to the 1878 survey of Anne Arundel County prepared by G. M. Hopkins, Civil Engineer (CE) of Philadelphia, the area that is located along the West Branch of the Patapsco River and is now known as Pumphrey was owned in large part by Charles Pumphrey.

Charles Pumphrey was a direct descendant of Walter Pumphrey. Walter was a Quaker who emigrated from England and arrived in Burlington, New Jersey, on a "boat load of Quakers" in 1678. Walter Pumphrey moved to the Baltimore area in 1708 to provide carpentry services to the many Quakers in that city. He purchased property throughout northern Anne Arundel County for a source of wood. A section of marshland in the area between what is now Linthicum and Pumphrey was known for some time as "Pumphrey's Swamp."

== Geography ==
Pumphrey is located at 39°12′55″N 76°38′23″W (39.215357, −76.639775).

According to the United States Census Bureau, the CDP had a total area of 2.5 square miles (6.5 km^{2}), of which 2.4 square miles (6.2 km^{2}) is land and 0.1 square miles (0.26 km^{2}) (4.33%) is water.

== Demographics ==
As of the census of 2000, there were 5,317 people, 2,026 households, and 1,391 families residing in the CDP. The population density was 2,180.6 inhabitants per square mile (841.9/km^{2}). There were 2,115 housing units at an average density of 867.4 per square mile (334.9/km^{2}). The racial makeup of the CDP was 78.62% White, 16.25% African American, 0.45% Native American, 2.41% Asian, 0.13% Pacific Islander, 0.53% from other races, and 1.62% from two or more races. Hispanic or Latino of any race were 1.75% of the population.

There were 2,026 households, out of which 26.9% had children under the age of 18 living with them, 51.5% were married couples living together, 12.8% had a female householder with no husband present, and 31.3% were non-families. 24.9% of all households were made up of individuals, and 9.2% had someone living alone who was 65 years of age or older. The average household size was 2.55 and the average family size was 3.03.

In the CDP, the population was spread out, with 21.8% under the age of 18, 6.3% from 18 to 24, 28.7% from 25 to 44, 25.6% from 45 to 64, and 17.6% who were 65 years of age or older. The median age was 41 years. For every 100 females, there were 95.7 males. For every 100 females age 18 and over, there were 90.4 males.

The median income for a household in the CDP was $45,321, and the median income for a family was $58,105. Males had a median income of $35,697 versus $29,828 for females. The per capita income for the CDP was $20,507. About 6.0% of families and 7.9% of the population were below the poverty line, including 11.1% of those under age 18 and 3.5% of those age 65 or over.

== See also ==
- Washington, Baltimore and Annapolis Electric Railway (1908–1935) - Pumphrey Station
- Baltimore and Annapolis Railroad (1887–1980) - Pumphrey Station
- Light Rail (Baltimore) (1992-present) - Nursery Road Station (Pumphrey)
