= Israel at the 1976 Summer Olympics =

- IOC code: ISR
- NOC: Olympic Committee of Israel

in Montreal
- Competitors: 26 in 10 sports
- Flag bearer: Esther Roth-Shachamarov
- Medals: Gold 0 Silver 0 Bronze 0 Total 0

Summer Olympics appearances (overview)
- 1952; 1956; 1960; 1964; 1968; 1972; 1976; 1980; 1984; 1988; 1992; 1996; 2000; 2004; 2008; 2012; 2016; 2020; 2024

Israel competed at the 1976 Summer Olympics in Montreal, Quebec, Canada. 28 competitors, 26 men and 2 women, took part in 19 events in 10 sports.

== Summary ==
Israel sent to the Olympics a football team, that qualified for the second time, and 11 individual athletes, the same number as the victims in Munich massacre four years earlier. All seven sports represented at the 1972 Olympics were retained for 1976: Athletics, swimming, shooting, fencing, wrestling, weight lifting and sailing. In addition to football, gymnastics also appeared for the second time, after a break of 16 years, and judo made its debut on the Israeli Olympic team.

This was by far the most successful Olympic Games for Israel until then. Esther Roth-Shahamorov, the only team member who was also in Munich, became the first Israeli athlete in any sport who reached an Olympic final, and finished sixth in women's 100m hurdles. Her place is still the best achievement by an Israeli track athlete. In weightlifting, Eduard Weitz came in fifth place, the best achievement of an Israeli at the Olympics in any sport until then, which still remains the best achievement in weightlifting in Israel's Olympic history. Another fine achievement was seventh place (unofficially) for Rami Miron in wrestling. Those three results were better than any previous result of Israeli athlete at the Olympics.

The football team, despite drawing its three preliminary round matches, still advanced to the quarterfinals, where it was eliminated by Brazil. It was a repeat of Israel's achievement in 1968.

== Athletics ==
Event	Participant	Result	Ref
Women's 100 metres hurdles	Esther Roth-Shahamorov	6th	13.04

== Fencing ==
Event	Participant	Result	Ref
Women's foil	Nili Drori		

== Football ==
During the 1976 Summer Olympics, Israel competed in football along with Iran and North Korea in the AFC. Additionally, Israeli referee Abraham Klein worked the tournament. Israel lost to Brazil in the quarter-finals and was eliminated.

=== Preliminary round - Group B ===
==== Standings ====
Team	Pld	W	D	L	GF	GA	GD	Pts
France	3	2	1	0	9	3	+6	5
Israel	3	0	3	0	3	3	0	3
Mexico	3	0	2	1	4	7	−3	2
Guatemala	3	0	2	1	2	5	−3	2

==== Matches ====
July 19, 1976
12:00

Israel	0 – 0	Guatemala
	Report

Varsity Stadium, Toronto
Attendance: 9.500
Referee: Vladimir Rudnev (Soviet Union)

July 21, 1976
12:00

Mexico	2 – 2	Israel
Rangel 19' 44'	Report	Oz 51'; Shum 55' (pen.)

Olympic Stadium, Montreal
Attendance: 36.569
Referee: Alberto Michelotti (Italy)

July 23, 1976
12:00

France	1 – 1	Israel
Platini 80' (pen.)	Report	Peretz 75'

Olympic Stadium, Montreal
Attendance: 33.639
Referee: Ramón Barreto (Uruguay)

=== Quarterfinals ===
==== Bracket ====
Quarter-finals
July 25 - Ottawa
East Germany	4
France	0
July 25 - Sherbrooke
Soviet Union	2
Iran	1
July 25 - Toronto
Brazil	4
Israel	1
July 25 - Montreal
Poland	5
North Korea	0

Semi-finals
July 27 - Montreal
East Germany	2
Soviet Union	1
July 27 - Toronto
Poland	2
Brazil	0

Final
July 31 - Montreal
East Germany	3
Poland	1
Bronze medal match
July 29 - Montreal
Soviet Union	2
Brazil	0

==== Matches ====
July 25, 1976
12:00

Brazil	4 – 1	Israel
Jarbas 56' 74' Erivelto 72'; Júnior 88'	Report	Peretz 80'

Varsity Stadium, Toronto
Attendance: 18.601
Referee: Károly Palotai (Hungary)

==== Final ranking ====
Pos	Team	Pld	W	D	L	GF	GA	GD	Pts
1	East Germany	5	4	1	0	10	2	+8	9
2	Poland	5	3	1	1	11	5	+6	7
3	Soviet Union	5	4	0	1	10	4	+6	8
4	Brazil	5	2	1	2	6	6	0	5
5	France	4	2	1	1	9	7	+2	5
6	Israel	4	0	3	1	4	7	−3	3
7	Iran	3	1	0	2	4	5	−1	2
8	North Korea	3	1	0	2	3	9	−6	2
9	Mexico	3	0	2	1	4	7	−3	2
10	Guatemala	3	0	2	1	2	5	−3	2
11	Cuba	2	0	1	1	0	1	−1	1
12	Spain	2	0	0	2	1	3	−2	0
13	Canada	2	0	0	2	2	5	−3	0

Source: rsssf.com

=== Goal scorers ===
2 goals

- Vicky Peretz

1 goal

- Itzhak Shum
- Yaron Oz

=== Squad ===
Head coach: David Schweitzer

No.	Pos.	Player	DoB	Age	Caps	Club	Tournament games	Tournament goals	Minutes played	Sub off	Sub on	Cards yellow/red
1	GK	Yitzhak Vissoker	Sep 18, 1944	31	?	(Israel) Hapoel Petah Tikva	4
2	DF	Avraham Lev	Aug 24, 1948	27	?	(Israel) Beitar Tel Aviv	2
3	MF	Yaron Oz	May 10, 1952	24	?	(Israel) Maccabi Tel Aviv	3	1
4	DF	Haim Bar	May 14, 1954	22	4	(Israel) Maccabi Netanya	4
5	MF	Moshe Schweitzer	Apr 24, 1954	22	?	(Israel) Maccabi Tel Aviv	4
6	FW	Vicky Peretz	Feb 11, 1953	23	?	(Israel) Maccabi Tel Aviv	4	2
7	MF	Itzhak Shum	Sep 1, 1948	27	?	(Israel) Hapoel Kfar Saba	4	1
8	DF	Eli Leventhal	Mar 18, 1953	23	?	(Israel) Hapoel Haifa	4
9	MF	Rifaat Turk	Sep 16, 1954	21	?	(Israel) Hapoel Tel Aviv	2
10	FW	Gideon Damti	Oct 31, 1951	24	?	(Israel) Shimshon Tel Aviv	4
11	GK	Yosef Sorinov	May 17, 1946	30	?	(Israel) Hapoel Ramat Gan	0
12	DF	Meir Nimni	Sep 29, 1948	27	?	(Israel) Maccabi Tel Aviv	4
13	FW	Oded Machnes	Jun 8, 1956	20	?	(Israel) Maccabi Netanya	2
14	DF	Avi Cohen	Nov 14, 1956	19	?	(Israel) Maccabi Tel Aviv	3
15	MF	Yehoshua Gal	Jul 11, 1951	25	?	(Israel) Maccabi Netanya	1
16	FW	Ehud Ben Tuvim	Aug 12, 1952	23	?	(Israel) Bnei Yehuda	0
17	DF	Alon Ben Dor	Mar 18, 1952	24	?	(Israel) Hapoel Be'er Sheva	4

== Gymnastics ==
Event	Participant	Result	Ref
	Dov Lupi		

== Judo ==
Event	Participant	Result	Ref
Men's -70 kg	Yona Melnik	Round of 32	

== Sailing ==
Event	Participant	Result	Ref
	Yehuda Maayan & Yoel Sela		

== Shooting ==
Event	Participant	Result	Ref
	Micha Kaufman		

== Swimming ==
Event	Participant	Result	Ref
	Dov Nisman		
	Adi Prag		

== Weightlifting ==
Event	Participant	Result	Ref
Weightlifting—Men's Featherweight	Eduard Weitz	5th	

== Wrestling ==
Event	Participant	Result	Ref
Men's Lightweight, Freestyle	Rami Miron	7th	
