= North Linthicum station =

North Linthicum
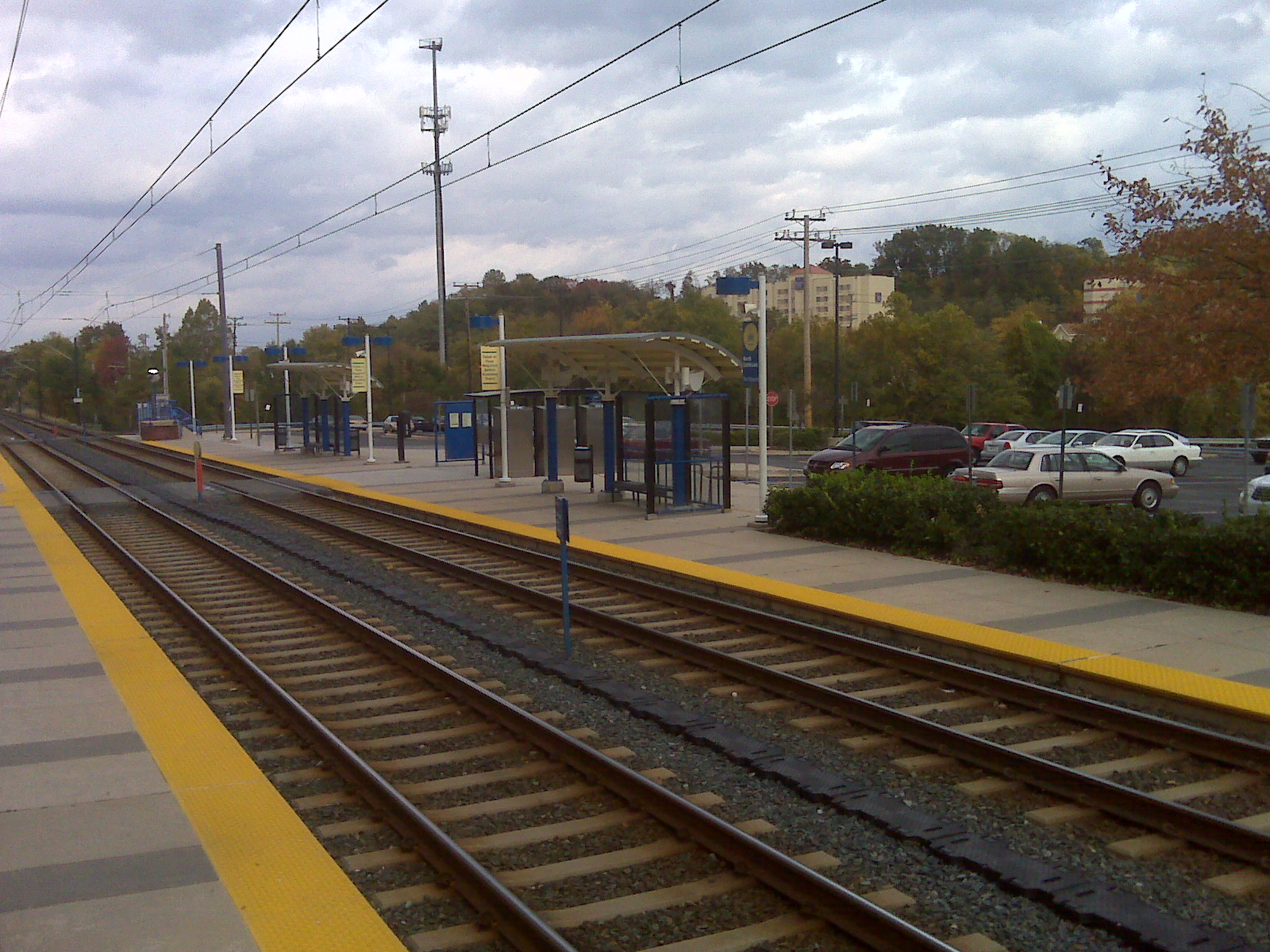
- North Linthicum station in 2010

General information
- Location: 450 North Camp Meade Road; Linthicum Heights, Maryland
- Coordinates: 39°12′51.6″N 76°38′45.9″W
- Owner: Maryland Transit Administration
- Platforms: 2 side platforms
- Tracks: 2

Construction
- Parking: 347 free spaces
- Accessible: Yes

History
- Opened: 1887 (B&A Railroad) as Pumphrey station
- Rebuilt: 1993

Passengers
- 2017: 579 daily

Services
Preceding station	Maryland Transit Administration	Following station
Linthicum toward BWI Airport or Glen Burnie	Light RailLink	Nursery Road toward Hunt Valley
Location

North Linthicum station is a Baltimore Light Rail station in Linthicum Heights, Maryland. There are currently 347 free parking spaces at this station. No bus connections can be made from here.

This station is the penultimate station on the light rail's trunk line that is shared by trains of both the Hunt Valley – BWI Marshall line and the Hunt Valley – Cromwell line. Both lines depart onto branches to BWI Marshall Airport station and Glen Burnie station south of the Linthicum station.

== Station layout ==
G
G	Side platform, doors will open on the right
G	Southbound	← Light Rail toward BWI Airport or Glen Burnie (Linthicum)
G	Northbound	Light Rail toward Hunt Valley (Nursery Road) →
G	Side platform, doors will open on the right
G	Street level	Exit/entrance
