= José Ramos (wrestler) =

Cuban wrestler (born 1949)

Personal information
- Full name: José Ramos Cardoso
- Born: 29 March 1949 (age 77) Camagüey, Cuba
- Height: 168 cm (5 ft 6 in)
- Weight: 70 kg (154 lb)

Sport
- Country: Cuba
- Sport: Wrestling
Medal record
Men's freestyle wrestling
Representing Cuba
Pan American Games
Silver medal – second place	1979 San Juan	68 kg

José Ramos Cardoso (born 29 March 1949) is a Cuban former wrestler who competed in the 1968 Summer Olympics, in the 1972 Summer Olympics, in the 1976 Summer Olympics, and in the 1980 Summer Olympics.
