= Kari Övermark =

Finnish wrestler

Personal information
- Nationality: Finnish
- Born: 2 August 1956 (age 69) Lappajärvi, Finland

Sport
- Sport: Wrestling

Kari Övermark (born 2 August 1956) is a Finnish wrestler. He competed in the men's freestyle 68 kg at the 1976 Summer Olympics.
