= 2nd MMC – Burgas =

Bulgarian constituency

Coordinates: 42°30′N 27°15′E

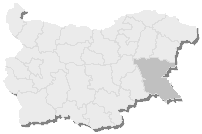
Map of Bulgaria, 2nd MMC - Burgas is highlighted

2nd Multi-member Constituency - Burgas is a constituency whose borders are the same as Burgas Province.

== Background ==
In the 2009 Bulgarian parliamentary election 2nd MMC – Burgas elected 12 members in the Bulgarian National Assembly, 11 of which were through proportionality vote and 1 was through first-past-the-post voting.

== Members in the Bulgarian National Assembly ==
- Through first-past-the-post voting

Election	Member	Party
2009		

- Through proportionality vote

Election	Member	Party
2009		
2009		
2009		
2009		
2009		
2009		
2009		
2009		
2009		
2009		
2009		

== Elections ==
2009 election

- proportionality vote

Party	Votes	%	Change	Seats	Change	
Citizens for European Development of Bulgaria						
Coalition for Bulgaria						
Movement for Rights and Freedoms						
National Union Attack						
National Movement for Stability and Progress						
Blue Coalition						
Lider (Bulgaria)						
Order, Lawfulness, Justice						
Others				—		—
Total-Valid				'—		
Invalid			—	—	—	—
Total Turnout			—	—	—	—

- first-past-the-post voting

Party	Candidate	Votes	%	Change
Citizens for European Development of Bulgaria	Bozhidar Dimitrov			
Coalition for Bulgaria	Lyubomir Pantaleev			
Movement for Rights and Freedoms	Iordan Tsonev			
National Union Attack	Volen Siderov			
National Movement for Stability and Progress	Hristo Grozev			
Blue Coalition	Valcho Cholakov			
Lider (Bulgaria)	Miroslav Sevlievski			
Order, Lawfulness, Justice	Georgi Manev			
Others				
Total Turnout			—	—

== See also ==
- 2009 Bulgarian parliamentary election
- Politics of Bulgaria
- List of Bulgarian Constituencies
