= Pavel Pinigin =

Soviet wrestler (born 1953)

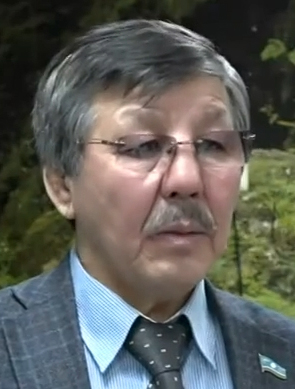
- Pavel Pinigin in 2016

Personal information
- Born: March 12, 1953 (age 73) Dirin, Russian SFSR, Soviet Union
- Height: 1.78 m (5 ft 10 in)
- Weight: 68 kg (150 lb)
- Spouse: Mariya Pinigina

Sport
- Sport: Freestyle wrestling
Medal record
Men's freestyle wrestling
Representing Soviet Union
Olympic Games
| Gold medal – first place | 1976 Montreal | 68 kg |
World Championships
| Gold medal – first place | 1975 Minsk | 68 kg |
| Gold medal – first place | 1977 Lausanne | 68 kg |
| Gold medal – first place | 1978 Mexico City | 68 kg |
Summer Universiade
| Silver medal – second place | 1973 Moscow | 68 kg |

Pavel Pinigin (Russian: Павел Павлович Пинигин; Yakut: Пинигин Павел Павлович; born 12 March 1953) is a former Soviet wrestler and Olympic champion in Freestyle wrestling. He is also three times world champion in freestyle wrestling. He is married to athlete and Olympic champion Mariya Pinigina.

== Olympics ==
Pinigin competed at the 1976 Summer Olympics in Montreal where he received a gold medal in Freestyle wrestling, the lightweight class.
