= Maryland Route 179 =

State highway in Anne Arundel County, Maryland

Maryland Route 179
- Maryland Route 179 highlighted in red

Route information
- Maintained by MDSHA
- Length: 3.16 mi (5.09 km)
- Existed: 1927–present

Major junctions
- West end: MD 648 near Annapolis
- US 50 / US 301 near Cape St. Claire
- East end: End of state maintenance in Cape St. Claire

Location
- Country: United States
- State: Maryland
- Counties: Anne Arundel

Highway system
- Maryland highway system; Interstate; US; State; Scenic Byways
← MD 178	→ MD 180

Maryland Route 179 (MD 179) is a state highway in the U.S. state of Maryland. Known for most of its length as St. Margarets Road, the highway runs 3.16 miles (5.09 km) from MD 648 near Annapolis east to the end of state maintenance in Cape St. Claire. MD 179 serves a suburban area near the southern end of the Broadneck Peninsula of northeastern Anne Arundel County. The state highway was paved in the 1920s from its western end to Skidmore near Sandy Point. MD 179 was truncated at what is now U.S. Route 50 (US 50)/US 301 when their predecessor highway replaced the stretch to Skidmore in the early 1940s. MD 179 was extended into Cape St. Claire in the early 1990s.

== Route description ==
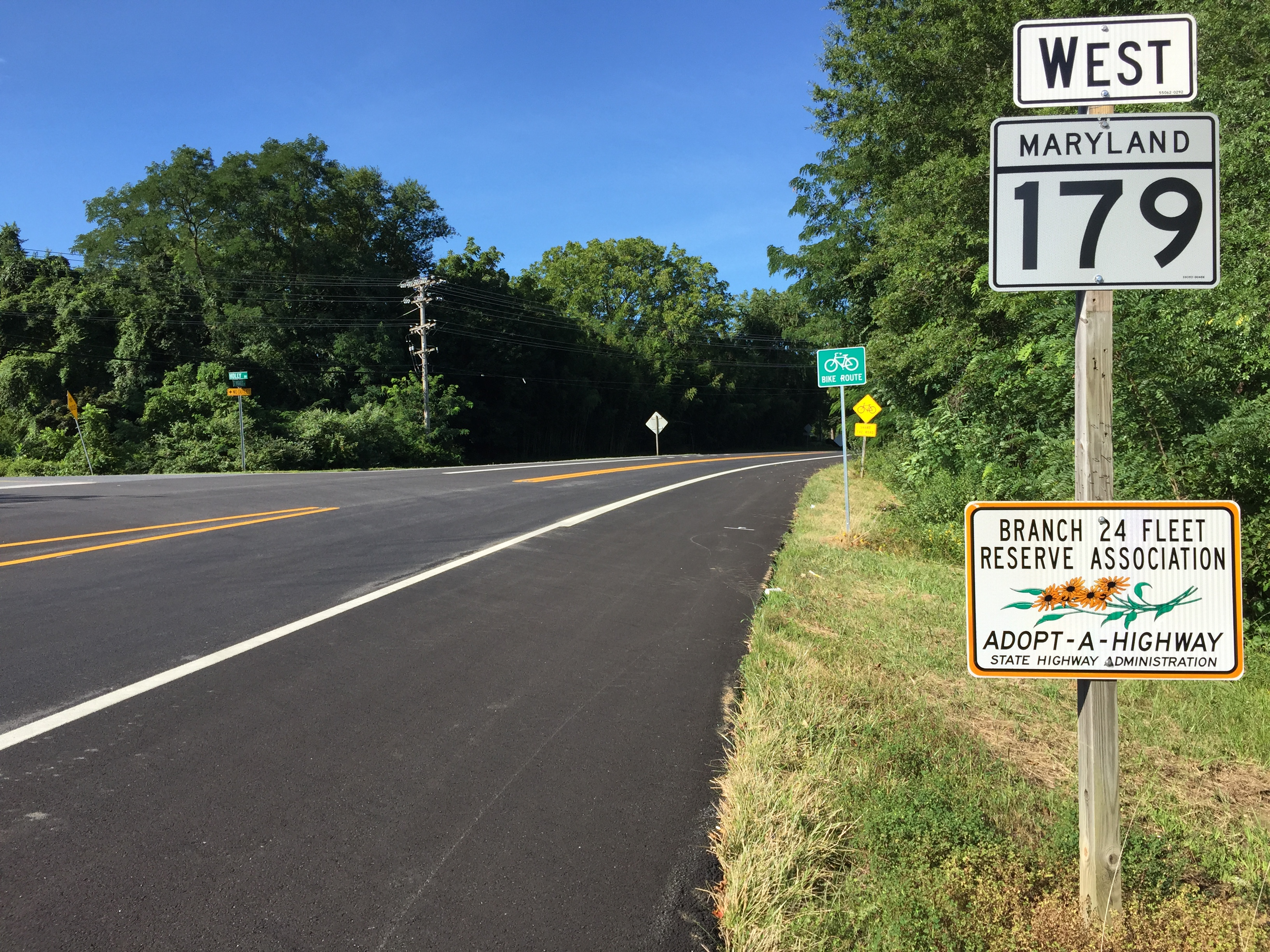
View west along MD 179 near US 50/US 301 near Cape St. Claire

MD 179 begins at an intersection with MD 648 (Baltimore-Annapolis Boulevard) east of Annapolis. The state highway heads northeast as two-lane undivided St. Margarets Road, which crosses Mill Creek and passes through the hamlet of St. Margaret's, the site of St. Margaret's Episcopal Church. At Holly Drive, which is unsigned MD 931L, MD 179 expands to a two-lane divided highway with auxiliary lanes. The highway has an intersection with Buschs Frontage Road and Whitehall Road, which are unsigned MD 908A and MD 908C, respectively. Buschs Frontage Road leads to ramps to and from eastbound US 50/US 301 (Blue Star Memorial Highway). MD 179 receives a ramp from the eastbound freeway immediately before it crosses over the freeway, then intersects ramps to and from westbound US 50/US 301. The highway continues northeast as Cape St. Claire Road and intersects College Parkway, which is unsigned MD 931Q. MD 179 reduces to a two-lane undivided road for the final stretch before its eastern terminus at an arbitrary spot between Woodland Circle, which is unsigned MD 931U, and Forest Terrace. Cape St. Claire Road continues as a county highway into the center of the namesake community at the mouth of the Magothy River.

== History ==
MD 179 was constructed from the Baltimore-Annapolis Boulevard (later MD 2 and now MD 648) east to St. Margarets in 1920. The highway was extended to the site of the US 50/US 301 interchange in 1928. MD 179 was extended east to Skidmore, a hamlet just west of what is today Sandy Point State Park, in 1929 and 1930. Between 1942 and 1944, a ferry terminal was constructed at Sandy Point as the new western end of the Annapolis-Matapeake ferry. A 6-mile (9.7 km) highway was constructed from MD 2 east to the new terminal along the alignment of the modern US 50/US 301 freeway. This highway, which was designated a westward extension of MD 404 by 1946, replaced the portion of MD 179 east of the modern US 50/US 301 interchange. MD 179's interchange with US 50 was constructed in 1991. The state highway was expanded to a divided highway through the interchange and extended northeast to its present terminus in Cape St. Claire.

== Junction list ==
The entire route is in Anne Arundel County.

Location	mi	km	Destinations	Notes
Annapolis	0.00	0.00	MD 648 (Baltimore-Annapolis Boulevard)	Western terminus; officially MD 648A
Cape St. Claire	2.42	3.89	MD 908 (Buschs Frontage Road/Whitehall Road) to US 50 east / US 301 north – Bay Bridge	Buschs Frontage Road is unsigned MD 908A; Whitehall Road is unsigned MD 908C
Cape St. Claire	2.65	4.26	US 50 west / US 301 south (Blue Star Memorial Highway) – Annapolis, Washington	US 50/US 301 exit 29
Cape St. Claire	2.83	4.55	College Parkway	Unsigned MD 931Q
Cape St. Claire	3.16	5.09	Cape St. Claire Road north	Eastern terminus; end of state maintenance
1.000 mi = 1.609 km; 1.000 km = 0.621 mi
