= Andrew Truxal =

American university President

Andrew Gehr Truxal
- Born: February 2, 1900
- Died: February 3, 1971 (aged 71)
- Occupation: Academic
- Known for: Third president of Hood College

Andrew Gehr Truxal (February 2, 1900 – February 3, 1971) was the third president of Hood College and the first president of Anne Arundel Community College. Truxal was a lifelong academic serving as instructor at several institutions and chairman of the sociology department of Dartmouth College.

Truxal is commemorated by a professorship and scholarship in Sociology at Hood College and a library named after him at Anne Arundel College.

== Education and early career ==
In 1920, Truxal graduated from Franklin and Marshall College in Lancaster, Pennsylvania, where he joined Phi Kappa Psi. Following that, he attended the Eastern Theological Seminary of the Evangelical and Reformed Church of the United States in Lancaster where he received his degree in divinity and became an ordained minister in 1923. He then served as instructor of history and economics at Franklin and Marshall and instructor of history at Millersburg State Teachers College.

Truxal received his doctorate from Columbia University in 1928. Upon this, he joined the faculty of Dartmouth as a professor in sociology before taking over as chairman of that department in 1935. He briefly served, along with Bancroft H. Brown and W. Stuart Messer, as interim Dean of the Faculty of Dartmouth following the death of Dean Gordon Bill.

== Presidency at Hood College ==
On October 21, 1948, Truxal was inaugurated as the third president of Hood College in Frederick, Maryland. He succeeded Irvin Stahr who resigned in July 1948. The ceremony was held in the Hodson Outdoor Theater and featured a keynote address by Isaiah Bowman, former president of Johns Hopkins University. In his inaugural address, Dr. Truxal told the students that

We have been entirely too content with the mere training of the intellect. The only kind of education that will be at all adequate for the world of tomorrow must be an education which gives equal emphasis to the training of intellect and to the development of character.

During his time at Hood, Truxal oversaw the construction of Hodson Science Hall, Coffman Chapel, Gambrill Gymnasium, the President's House, and Fox Alumnae Headquarters. With the completion of the President's House, Dr. Truxal auctioned off the rights to spend an evening with the Truxals in the house. All funds raised in these auctions were given to the World Student Service Fund. He briefly stepped aside in 1953 after suffering a heart attack. An administrative committee stood in his place during his recovery.

On January 22, 1961, Truxal was named the first president of Anne Arundel Junior College. Dr. Randle Elliott was announced as Truxal's successor at Hood on February 8 and Truxal retired from the college on July 1 of that year.

== Presidency at Anne Arundel Community College ==
Truxal was the unanimous choice of the Anne Arundel County commissioners to become the president of the new college. The college opened in September 1961 offering night classes at Severna Park High School. In 1967, under his tenure as president, the college moved to its current campus in Arnold, Maryland. The college also received its full accreditation from the Middle States Commission on Higher Education during his presidency. He retired from the position in August 1968.

== Legacy ==
Truxal died on February 3, 1971, of a heart attack in his winter home in Naples, Florida. Hood College still recognizes the contributions of Dr. Truxal through a sociology scholarship. The chair of the sociology department at Hood receives the title of "Andrew G. Truxal Professor of Sociology." In addition, the pergola located at the center of the residential quad is named in his honor.

Anne Arundel has honored Dr. Truxal with the Andrew G. Truxal Library on its campus. One male and one female student-athlete a year receive the Dr. Andrew G. Truxal Award for his or her total involvement with athletics and accomplishments in extracurricular activities.

== Bibliography ==
- Truxal, Andrew G. and Francis E. Merrill. The Family in American Culture. New York, Prentice Hall, 1947.
