= Michael Peroutka =

American politician (born 1952)

Chairman of the Anne Arundel County Council
- In office December 4, 2017 – December 1, 2018
- Preceded by: John Grasso
- Succeeded by: Andrew Pruski

Member of the Anne Arundel County Council from the 5th district
- In office December 1, 2014 – December 1, 2018
- Preceded by: Dick Ladd
- Succeeded by: Amanda Fielder

Personal details
- Born: Michael Anthony Peroutka; 1952 (age 73–74)
- Party: Republican (2014–present)
- Other political affiliations: Constitution (before 2014)
- Education: Loyola University, Maryland (BA); University of Baltimore (JD)

Michael Anthony Peroutka (born 1952) is an American far-right politician, lawyer, and neo-Confederate activist from Maryland. He was the Republican nominee for Attorney General of Maryland in 2022, and was the Constitution Party candidate for president in 2004.

Peroutka is a former member of the League of the South, a white supremacist and white nationalist organization designated by the Southern Poverty Law Center as a hate group. Peroutka is known for his pro-secessionist views, and has said that he is "still angry" that Maryland did not join the Confederacy in the Civil War. Peroutka has voiced support for disproven conspiracy theories about the September 11 terrorist attacks, falsely claiming that the attacks were an "inside job" accomplished using explosives.

Peroutka attended Loyola University Maryland and the University of Baltimore School of Law. He was the chairman of the Constitution Party of Maryland and a member of the executive committee of the Constitution Party National Committee. In 2014, he became a Republican and won election to the County Council of Anne Arundel County, Maryland, representing District 5.

He is of Czech descent.

== 2004 presidential campaign ==
In the 2004 United States presidential election, he was the Constitution Party's candidate. His campaign slogan was "God, Family, Republic" and heavily featured Christian and socially conservative themes. His running mate was independent Baptist minister Chuck Baldwin. Peroutka gained support from many paleoconservatives, and was endorsed by the America First Party and Alaskan Independence Party. Peroutka was also endorsed by the League of the South and supported by a group called "Southerners for Peroutka". Peroutka accepted the endorsement from the League at their 2004 national convention. Far-right radio host and conspiracy theorist Alex Jones stated that he would be voting for Peroutka.

Peroutka appeared on the far-right radio show The Political Cesspool to promote his campaign, describing it as a "Christian/Constitutionalist radio program" and "a great blessing to our cause". Paleoconservative political commentator Pat Buchanan stated on the September 7, 2004, edition of Hardball with Chris Matthews that he was considering voting for Peroutka. The November 8, 2004, issue of The American Conservative contained endorsements by Taki Theodoracopulos and Howard Phillips (the latter having founded the party Peroutka represented). Peroutka received just over 0.01% of the national popular vote, finishing fifth nationally with almost 150,000 votes. This was a similar showing to previous Constitution Party candidacies of Howard Phillips, and made the party the only third party to increase its share of the vote in 2004. Kentucky Republican politician Matt Bevin's support for Peroutka's candidacy was used in a 2013 attack ad by opponent Mitch McConnell.

== Political positions ==
Peroutka is a Christian nationalist who holds views outside the mainstream of U.S. political discourse, even within the modern Republican Party. He said that government officials must "take a biblical worldview and apply it to civil law and government" and referred to the principle of separation of church and state as a "great lie." Peroutka views public schools as a Communist plot; he supports homeschooling and opposes government funding for education, stating that it is "the 10th plank in the Communist Manifesto." He rejects laws and constitutional protections protecting abortion and same-sex marriage.

In 2006, he voted in favor of disaffiliating the Independent American Party of Nevada from the Constitution Party due to their allowance for abortion in certain circumstances. In 2012, the Montgomery Advertiser reported that Peroutka was the single-largest donor to Roy Moore's 2012 campaign for the Alabama Supreme Court, having contributed $50,000 of the total $78,000 received by Moore until December 31, 2011.

Peroutka is a former board member of the League of the South, a neo-Confederate organization that is classified by the Southern Poverty Law Center as a hate group. He was a member of the group's board of directors from 2012 to 2014. In 2012, the Human Rights Campaign called Peroutka an "active white supremacist and secessionist sympathizer" due to his ties to the League. Peroutka told The Baltimore Sun that he "continues to be a proud member of the League of the South," since it "has a belief that the central government is too large, too spend-thrift and too out-of-control," but he called HRC's characterization of him as a white-supremacist sympathizer "absurd" and "not at all true." In 2012, a video showed Peroutka asking a group to stand for the national anthem, and then leading them in the de facto Confederate anthem, "Dixie". In 2013, he stated that "all elevation or denigration of individuals or groups based on skin color is immoral and shameful." In October 2014, during his campaign for the Anne Arundel County Council, Peroutka announced that he had resigned from the League of the South board of directors and was no longer a member after discovering statements made by members that were "contrary to [his] beliefs". He declined to disavow the group during his 2022 campaign for Maryland attorney general.

== Split from the National Constitution Party ==
In 2006, the Maryland Constitution Party disaffiliated from the national party along with other state parties following a schism at the national party's 2006 convention, in which it failed to disaffiliate the Nevada party despite its chairman and gubernatorial candidate's support for legal abortion in some cases. Peroutka stated, "At this point I could not, in good faith, represent the Constitution Party nor endorse any of its candidates. Unless serious changes occur, I could not run for President in 2008."

Peroutka's supporters, however, collected enough signatures to get his name approved as a write-in candidate in Georgia for the 2008 presidential election.

== Republican Party ==
=== Election in 2014 to Anne Arundel County Council ===
In February 2014, Peroutka switched his voter registration from Constitution Party to Republican and filed to run for a seat on the Anne Arundel County Council as well as a seat on the county's Republican Central Committee. Peroutka won the seat on the Central Committee, becoming an official representative of the Republican Party in Anne Arundel County, Maryland. Peroutka also won the primary election for county council from District 5 on June 24, defeating a number of other Republican candidates, including the incumbent councilman Dick Ladd. He won by 38 votes over Maureen Carr-York to become the Republican nominee in the November 2014 general election. Peroutka won in the general election with 53 percent of the vote and a margin of victory of nearly 1,900 votes over his Democratic opponent. His district covered Severna Park, Millersville, Arnold, and Broadneck. Peroutka, along with the rest of the council, was sworn in on December 1, 2014.

=== Loss in 2018 re-election campaign ===
Running for reelection from District 5 in June 2018, Peroutka lost the Republican primary to candidate Amanda Fiedler, 53 percent to 47 percent.

=== 2022 campaign for Attorney General of Maryland ===
In February 2022, Peroutka filed to run for Attorney General of Maryland. He ran on the slogan "Liberty forever, Mandates never!" and a platform of opposing COVID-19 restrictions, fear of crime and immigration, election integrity, and opposition to abortion. Peroutka ran on a platform in which he prioritize what he called "God-given, constitutionally-protected rights" over state and federal laws, specifically those on abortion and same-sex marriage. He also pledged to take legal action against Governor Larry Hogan and local health officers for actions they took to slow the spread of COVID-19. Peroutka won the Republican primary on July 19, 2022, with 55.0 percent of the vote over his challenger Jim Shalleck. Peroutka's victory made him one of several extremist candidates nominated by the Republican Party in 2022.

During the general election, he said that he would accept the results of the election if they "appear to be lawful and legal", but supported legal efforts by state delegate and Republican nominee for governor Dan Cox to block the counting of mail-in ballots ahead of Election Day. Peroutka was defeated by Democratic U.S. Representative Anthony Brown in the general election on November 8, 2022. On November 10, Peroutka said he would not concede the election to Brown, claiming without evidence that "many odd and suspicious incidents were reported by poll watchers, and more reports are being gathered today."

== Support for creationism ==
In May 2014, Peroutka, acting on behalf of the Elizabeth Streb Peroutka foundation, a charity he and his brother Stephen established and named after their mother, donated an Allosaurus skeleton to the Creation Museum, a 70,000-square-foot museum in Petersburg, Kentucky, that promotes the pseudoscientific young Earth creationist explanation of the origins of the universe put forth in Biblical literalism.

Party political offices
Preceded by Howard Phillips	Constitution nominee for President of the United States; 2004	Succeeded by Chuck Baldwin
