= Stephen Barchet =

American football player, naval officer (1901–1964)

Navy Midshipmen
- Position: Halfback

Personal information
- Born: April 4, 1901; St. Margaret's, Maryland, US
- Died: November 30, 1964 (aged 63); Annapolis, Maryland, US

Career information
- College: Navy (1921-1922)

Awards and highlights
- 2× Third-team All-American (1921, 1922)

Stephen George Barchet (April 4, 1901 – November 30, 1964) was an American football player and a rear admiral in the United States Navy.

Barchet was born in St. Margaret's, Maryland, in 1901. He received his early education at the Donaldson School in Baltimore, St. John's College in Annapolis and Johns Hopkins University. Barchet then attended the United States Naval Academy, where he played baseball and football. He played as a halfback for the Navy Midshipmen football team and was selected by Walter Camp as a third-team All-American in both 1921 and 1922 and won the Thompson Trophy in 1922.

After graduating from the Naval Academy, Barchet served in the United States Navy for 30 years from 1924 to 1954, attaining the rank of rear admiral. He commanded USS Argonaut, which was near Midway Island, when the attack on Pearl Harbor occurred. He later commanded a submarine division base in Panama and served as operations officer for the Atlantic submarine force. In 1945, he received the Legion of Merit for his contributions to the development of the Atlantic and Pacific submarine fleets. In all, Barchet received two awards of the Legion of Merit and a Bronze Star Medal for his World War II service.

From June 1949 to March 1951, Barchet was assigned to the Naval War College, where he served as administrative secretary. He retired from the Navy in 1954 and was advanced to rear admiral on the retired list. He later worked for the American Trading and Production Company and as the head of a paper company in Alabama. He died in 1964 at age 63 at the naval hospital in Annapolis, Maryland. He was buried at the United States Naval Academy Cemetery in Annapolis, Maryland with his wife Louise Elizabeth Lankford.
