= Little Magothy River =

River in Maryland, United States

Coordinates: 39°2′45.5″N 76°25′46.5″W

The Little Magothy River runs 2.5 miles (4.0 km) through Anne Arundel County in the U.S. state of Maryland. It is located southeast of the Magothy River, just outside its mouth and north of the Severn River.

A small, mostly tidal river, the Little Magothy's watershed (not including the water surface) covers an area of 2.2 square miles (5.7 km^{2}). All mailing addresses in the watershed are in the Annapolis zip code, and the entire watershed is within Anne Arundel County, on the north side of the Broadneck Peninsula. It is bordered on the west by the community of Cape Saint Claire, and on the east by houses and farms along Bay Head Road. It runs just west of Sandy Point State Park. It starts near College Parkway and US 50/301, just north of the Whitehall Creek watershed (which is part of the Severn River watershed that drains to Whitehall Bay), and it flows north into the Chesapeake Bay south of Gibson Island. It has one named nontidal creek that drains into its upper end, Cat Branch, which flows under Cape Saint Claire Road. According to "My River Speaks," p. 141, Cat Branch was dammed in the mid-18th century to supply water through a canal to a mill in the upper Whitehall Creek watershed (part of the Severn River watershed).

The 6.5 miles of Chesapeake shoreline including the Little Magothy River and stretching to Sandy Point, all well beyond the official mouth of the Magothy (which is 325 meters south of the southern tip of Gibson Island) are not in the Magothy drainage basin but are often included in county and state government studies of the Magothy watershed.

== See also ==
- List of Maryland rivers
