= Andrew Pruski =

American politician (born 1978)

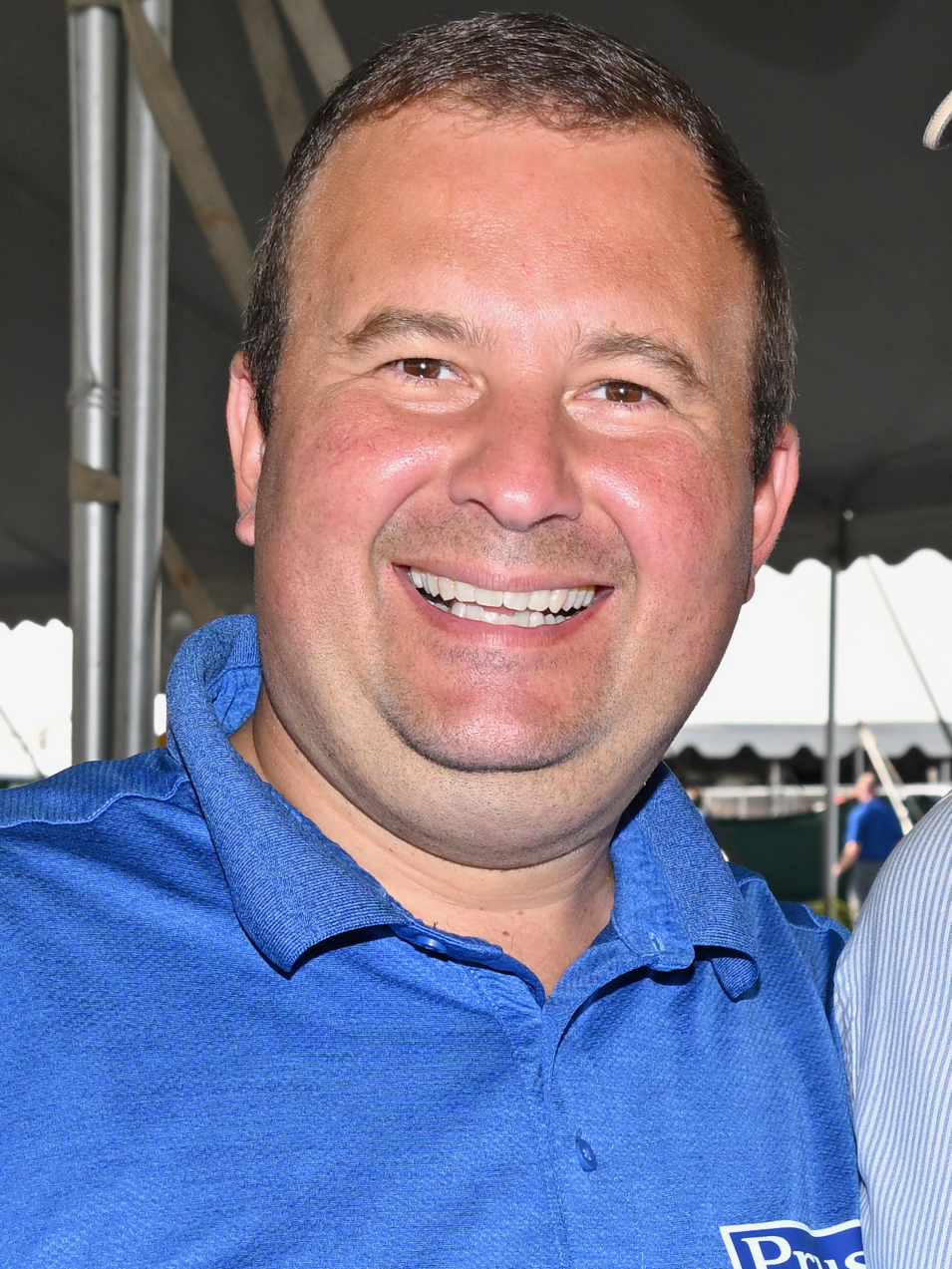
- Pruski in 2022

Member of the Maryland House of Delegates from the 33A district
- Incumbent
- Assumed office January 11, 2023
- Preceded by: Sid Saab

Chairman of the Anne Arundel County Council
- In office December 3, 2018 – December 2, 2019
- Preceded by: Michael Peroutka
- Succeeded by: Allison Pickard

Member of the Anne Arundel County Council from the 4th district
- In office December 1, 2014 – December 5, 2022
- Preceded by: Jamie Benoit
- Succeeded by: Julie Hummer

Personal details
- Born: Andrew Christopher Pruski; November 11, 1978 (age 47) Batavia, New York, U.S.
- Party: Democratic
- Education: Niagara University (BA, MS)
- Occupation: Social studies teacher
- Website: Campaign website

Andrew Christopher Pruski (born November 11, 1978) is an American politician. He is a member of the Maryland House of Delegates for District 33A in Anne Arundel County, Maryland. He was previously a member of the Anne Arundel County Council from 2014 to 2022, serving as its chair from 2018 to 2019 and its vice-chair from 2021 to 2022.

== Background ==
Pruski was born in Batavia, New York, on November 11, 1978. He graduated from Niagara University, earning his Bachelor of Arts in history in 2000 and his Master of Science in secondary education in 2001.

Shortly after graduating, Pruski became a social studies teacher at Frederick Douglass High School. In October 2003, he participated in a school employees protest at the Prince George's County Public Schools headquarters over stalled contract negotiations and persistent payroll errors. Although the school board reached a contract with the teachers' union in December, Pruski expressed discontent with the deal, saying "There are a lot of issues on the table we need to discuss. It's not just the contract." Pruski later worked as an assessment supervisor for Baltimore County Public Schools from 2005 to 2014, and for Prince George's County Public Schools since 2014.

Pruski entered politics in 2006, running unsuccessfully for the Anne Arundel County Council and losing to Jamie Benoit in the Democratic primary. In the same year, he was appointed to the Anne Arundel County Board of Appeals, where he served until 2009, when he was appointed to the Anne Arundel County Board of Education by Governor Martin O'Malley.

In August 2013, Pruski announced that he would again run for the Anne Arundel County Council in District 4. Pruski narrowly won the Democratic primary on June 24, 2014, edging out his opponent by 151 votes. Afterwards, Pruski resigned from the Anne Arundel County Board of Education, complying with a state law that prohibits candidates from appearing on a general election ballot for more than one paid position. Pruski won the general election on November 4, defeating Republican challenger Chike Anyanwu with 57.5 percent of the vote.

== Anne Arundel County Council ==
Pruski was sworn into the Anne Arundel County Council on December 1, 2014. He was re-elected in 2018, making him the only incumbent council member who was not term limited and was not defeated in the primary election. In December 2018, Pruski was unanimously elected to serve as the county council's chairman.

In September 2021, Pruski said he was considering a run for the Maryland House of Delegates, but said his decision depended on the legislative maps drawn by the General Assembly. He filed to run for delegate in District 33, later being redrawn into District 33A, in December. He won the Democratic primary on July 19, 2022, receiving 52.2 percent of the vote. He won the general election on November 8, defeating Republican challenger Kim Mills.

== In the legislature ==
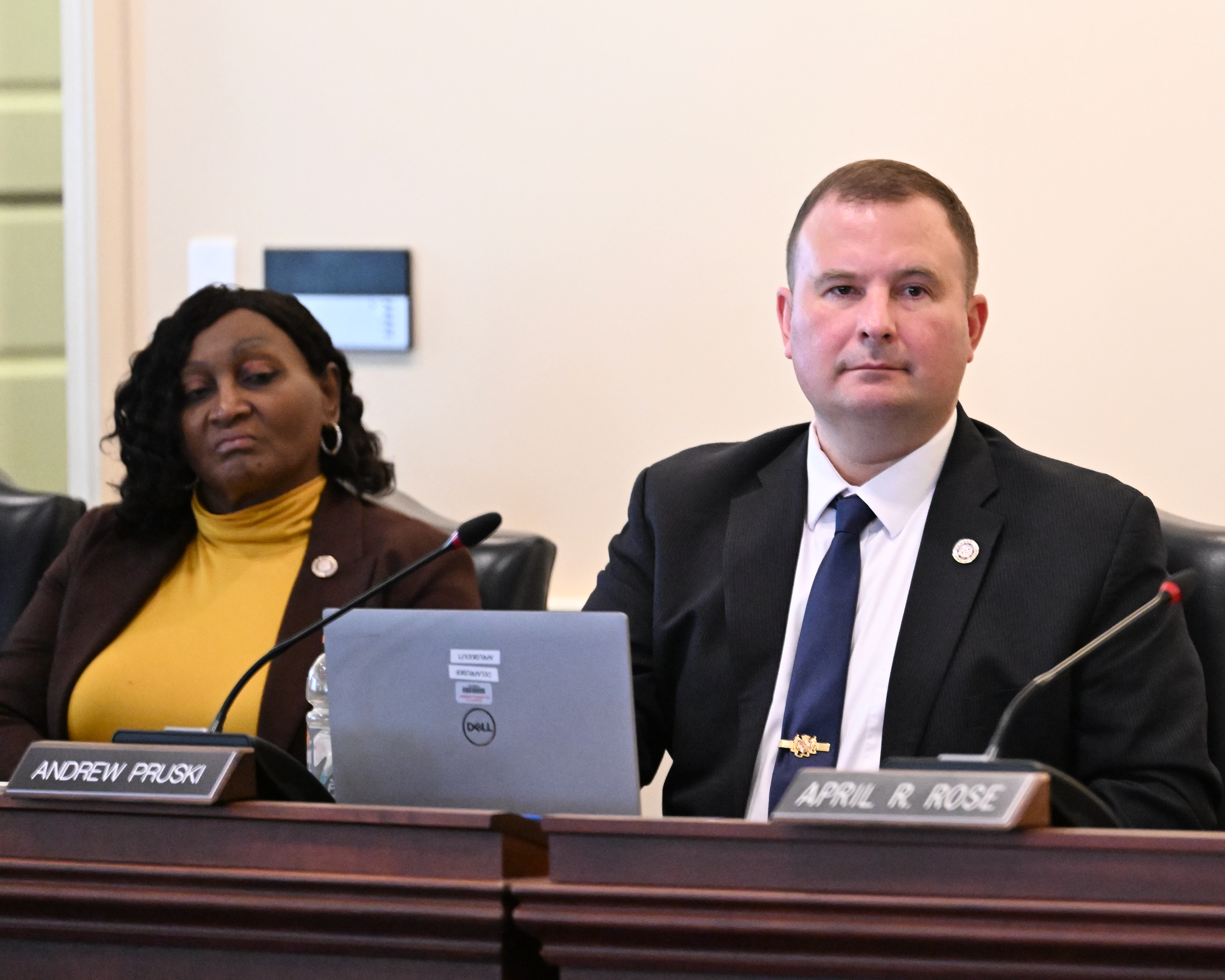
Pruski in the Economic Matters Committee, 2024

Pruski was sworn into the Maryland House of Delegates on January 11, 2023. He is a member of the House Economic Matters Committee. Pruski was a delegate to the 2024 Democratic National Convention, pledged to Kamala Harris.

== Political positions ==
=== Education ===
Pruski supports the Blueprint for Maryland's Future, a sweeping education reform bill passed by the legislature during the 2020 legislative session that would provide schools with $3.8 billion a year for 10 years, but thinks that teachers should be paid more apart from the raises outlined in the Blueprint.

In January 2010, Pruski voted against the expansion of charter middle schools through ninth grade.

In May 2019, Pruski said he supported county executive Steuart Pittman's first budget, which included $46 million in additional funding for education paid for through increased income and property taxes.

=== Environment ===
In March 2015, Pruski said he opposed a full repeal of Maryland's "Rain Tax", but supported finding ways to reduce the fees imposed by the tax. In April, he voted against bills that would repeal the stormwater fee in Anne Arundel County.

In October 2016, Pruski wrote to the Anne Arundel County Delegation to ask legislators to support a bill that would ban fracking during the 2017 legislative session.

=== Gun control ===
In January 2022, Pruski introduced a bill that requires gun store owners to install video surveillance, exterior bollards, and concrete barriers to prevent smash-and-grab style burglaries at gun stores. The bill passed and was signed into law by county executive Steuart Pittman on January 4, 2022.

=== Housing ===
In June 2019, Pruski introduced a bill that would give workforce housing a 50 percent discount on capital connection charges and expands the types of zones allowing that housing.

In June 2020, Pruski voted against a bill that would limit where assisted living facilities could be built in residential areas.

In July 2020, Pruski introduced a bill that would pause rent increases of 3 percent or more during the COVID-19 pandemic, until 120 days after the state's emergency declaration is lifted. The bill passed in a 4-3 vote.

=== Marijuana ===
In September 2015, Pruski introduced a bill that would limit where medical marijuana dispensaries could be built.

=== National politics ===
In July 2019, Pruski endorsed Joe Biden in the 2020 Democratic presidential primary.

In February 2021, Pruski voted for a resolution that condemned the January 6 United States Capitol attack and called for the disqualification of President Donald Trump from holding office again.

=== Social issues ===
In September 2018, Pruski voted against a resolution introduced by councilmember Michael Peroutka that would have recognized "preborn" children as human and deserving of humane treatment and protection. In July 2022, following the Supreme Court's decisions in Dobbs v. Jackson Women's Health Organization, Pruski voted for a resolution in the Anne Arundel County Council supporting a women's access to reproductive health care.

== Personal life ==
Pruski is married to his wife, Roxanne, who as of 2013 is an assistant at Broadneck High School. Together, they have three children and live in Gambrills, Maryland.

== Electoral history ==
Anne Arundel County Council District 4 Democratic primary election, 2006
Party	Candidate	Votes	%
Democratic	Jamie Benoit (incumbent)	3,944	68.9
Democratic	Devin F. Tucker	862	15.1
Democratic	Andrew C. Pruski	631	11.0
Democratic	Walter Kenneth Moody	290	5.1

Anne Arundel County Council District 4 Democratic primary election, 2014
Party	Candidate	Votes	%
Democratic	Andrew C. Pruski	1,508	36.1
Democratic	Scott Hymes	1,361	32.6
Democratic	Devin F. Tucker	1,307	31.3

Anne Arundel County Council District 4 election, 2014
Party	Candidate	Votes	%
Democratic	Andrew C. Pruski	12,239	57.5
Republican	E. "Chike" Anyanwu	9,008	42.3
Write-in		30	0.1

Anne Arundel County Council District 4 Democratic primary election, 2018
Party	Candidate	Votes	%
Democratic	Andrew C. Pruski (incumbent)	5,225	100.0

Anne Arundel County Council District 4 election, 2018
Party	Candidate	Votes	%
Democratic	Andrew C. Pruski (incumbent)	20,830	66.0
Republican	Torrey J. Snow	10,685	33.9
Write-in		25	0.1

Maryland House of Delegates District 33A Democratic primary election, 2022
Party	Candidate	Votes	%
Democratic	Andrew C. Pruski	1,959	52.2
Democratic	Marguerite R. Morris	1,338	35.7
Democratic	Michael J. Sopata	455	12.1

Maryland House of Delegates District 33A election, 2022
Party	Candidate	Votes	%
Democratic	Andrew Pruski	9,772	67.17
Republican	Kim Mills	4,765	32.75
Write-in		11	0.08
