= Evan Mendoza =

American baseball player (born 1996)

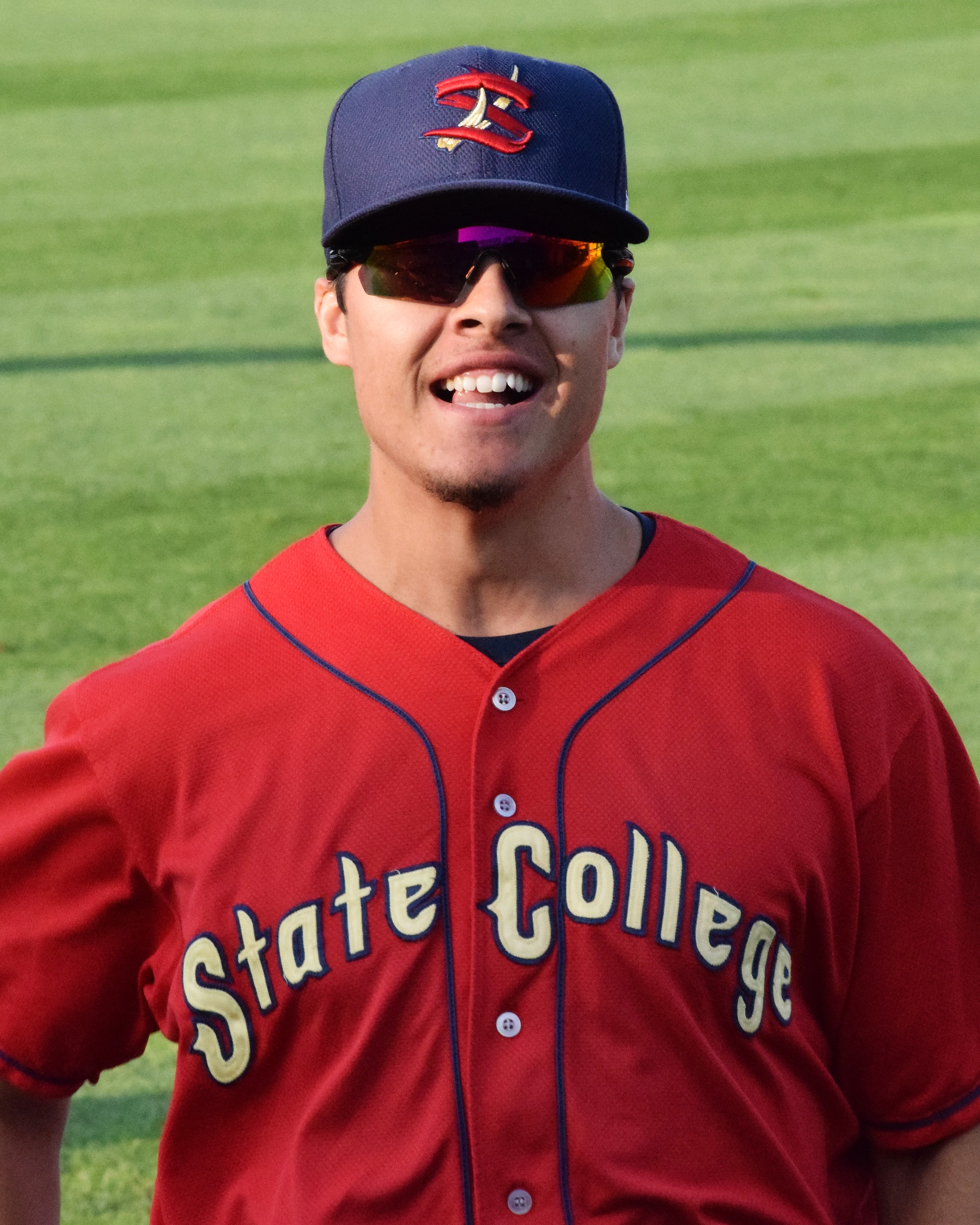
- Mendoza in 2017 with the State College Spikes
- Infielder
- Born: June 28, 1996 (age 29); Baltimore, Maryland, U.S.
- Bats: Right Throws: Right

Evan Manuel Mendoza (born June 28, 1996) is an American former professional baseball infielder. He played for the Colombia national baseball team.

== Amateur career ==
Mendoza was born in Baltimore, Maryland, and began his high school career at Severna Park High School in Severna Park, Maryland. After his freshman year, he and his family moved to Sarasota, Florida where he attended Sarasota High School. As a senior in 2014, he was 7–2 with a 0.78 ERA in 54 innings pitched. He was not drafted out of high school in the 2014 MLB draft and enrolled at North Carolina State University where he played college baseball for the NC State Wolfpack.

As a freshman at NC State in 2015, Mendoza struggled, posting a 6.75 ERA in nine appearances. After his freshman season, he was converted from a pitcher to a position player. As a sophomore he led NC State with a .362 batting average and was named to the All-ACC second team. After the 2016 season, he played collegiate summer baseball with the Bourne Braves of the Cape Cod Baseball League. In 2017, as a junior, he started all 61 of NC State's games and batted .262 with five home runs and 35 RBIs.

== Professional career ==
=== St. Louis Cardinals ===
After his junior year, the St. Louis Cardinals selected Mendoza in the 11th round of the 2017 MLB draft. He signed with the Cardinals for $150,000 and was assigned to the State College Spikes. After batting .370/.431/.549 with three home runs, 28 RBIs, and 14 doubles in 41 games he was promoted to the Peoria Chiefs in August where he finished the season, batting .270 with one home run, eight RBIs, and six doubles in 18 games. While playing for State College, he was named to the New York-Penn League All-Star Game, and his .370 batting average won him the title of 2017 New York-Penn League batting champion. He began 2018 with the Palm Beach Cardinals where he was named to the Florida State League All-Star Game. After batting .349/.394/.456 with three home runs and 16 RBIs through 37 games, he was promoted to the Springfield Cardinals in May. Mendoza was selected as St. Louis' Minor League Player of the Month for May after batting a combined .369 with an .895 OPS in 28 total games played between Palm Beach and Springfield during the month. He ended the year with Springfield, hitting .254 with five home runs and 26 RBIs in 98 games.

Mendoza began 2019 with the Memphis Redbirds but was reassigned back to Springfield in April. He was promoted back to Memphis in June, but placed on the injured list that same month after breaking his wrist, ultimately ending his season. Over sixty games between the two teams, Mendoza hit .252 with one home run and 21 RBIs. He did not play a minor league game in 2020 due to the cancellation of the minor league season caused by the COVID-19 pandemic. For the 2021 season, Mendoza returned to Memphis, slashing .242/.305/.290 with one home run, 27 RBIs, and 14 doubles over 116 games. He returned to Memphis for the 2022 season. Over 109 games, he batted .247 with four home runs, 29 RBIs, and 17 stolen bases.

=== San Diego Padres ===
On December 7, 2022, the San Diego Padres selected Mendoza from the Cardinals in the minor league phase in the Rule 5 draft. He split the 2023 season between the rookie–level Arizona Complex League Padres, Double–A San Antonio Missions, and Triple–A El Paso Chihuahuas. Playing in just 31 total games due to injury, Mendoza hit .226/.274/.287 with two home runs, 11 RBI, and five stolen bases. He elected free agency following the season on November 6, 2023.

== International career ==
Mendoza is of Colombian descent through his father. He played for the Colombia national baseball team at the 2023 World Baseball Classic.

== See also ==
- Rule 5 draft results
