= Anne Arundel Community College =

Public college in Anne Arundel County, Maryland, U.S.

Coordinates: 39.0523°N 76.5114°W

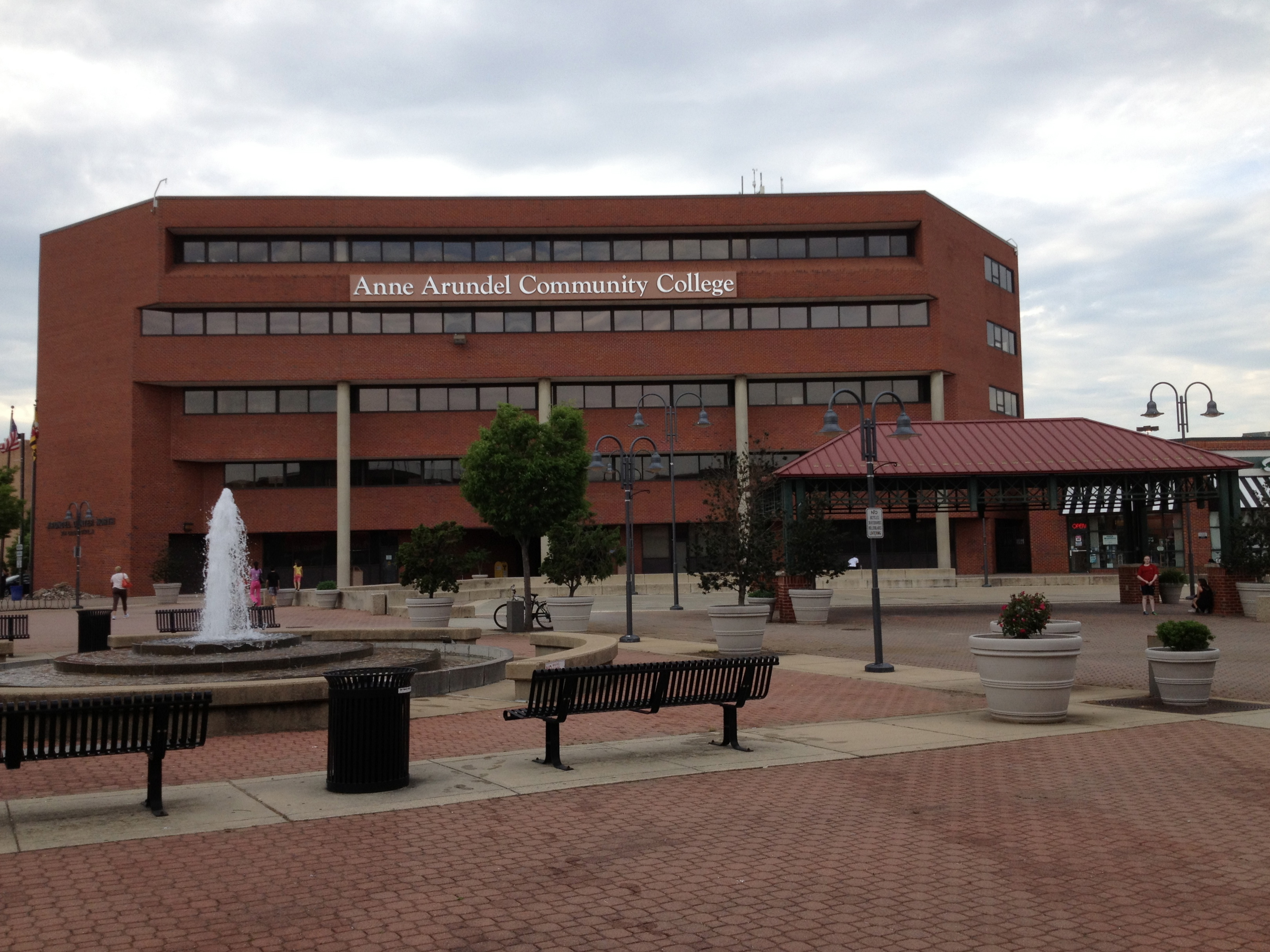
- Anne Arundel Community College, Glen Burnie branch
- Former name: Anne Arundel Junior College
- Type: Public Community College
- Established: 1961; 65 years ago
- Accreditation: MSCHE
- Endowment: $7.8 million
- President: Dawn Lindsay
- Faculty: 264 full-time 804 part-time
- Administrative staff: 610
- Students: 35,362
- Location: Arnold, Maryland, United States
- Campus: 230 acres (0.93 km^{2})
- Newspaper: Campus Current
- Colors: Deep teal, dark blue and light teal
- Nickname: Riverhawks
- Sporting affiliations: NJCAA; MDJUCO
- Mascot: Swoop the Riverhawk
- Website: www.aacc.edu

Anne Arundel Community College (AACC) is a public community college in Arnold, Maryland. The college was founded in 1961 and is accredited by the Middle States Commission on Higher Education. The community college offers letters of recognition, 46 associate degree programs, and 62 certificate programs through its five schools.

AACC's athletic teams compete in the Maryland Junior College Athletic Conference (MDJUCO) of the NJCAA. They are collectively known as the Riverhawks and have won four national championships. AACC Athletics has won the Dr. Jack Cistriano Sportsmanship Award six times. The award is presented annually by the MDJUCO to the member school whose teams have demonstrated the best sportsmanship throughout an academic year.

AACC was ranked #1 Community College in the Country by Academic Influence in 2021. It was previously named "Community College of the Year" by National Business Alliance in 2001, and has continued to receive accolades since then. It is the first higher education institution in Maryland to earn a rating from the Association for the Advancement of Sustainability in Higher Education and achieved a silver rating in 2012.

== History ==
Anne Arundel Community College was founded as Anne Arundel Junior College on January 2, 1961, by the Anne Arundel County Board of Education. Classes commenced in September 1961 at Severna Park High School with 270 students enrolled. Dr. Andrew G. Truxal served as the first president during the school's transition to a 165-acre (0.67 km^{2}) campus in Arnold, Maryland, in September 1967. The school was awarded full accreditation by the Middle States Commission on Higher Education (MSCHE) in 1968.

In August 1968, Dr. Robert P. Ludlum was appointed AACC's second president. During his eight-year term, AACC began offering transfer, career and continuing education programs as well as tuition waivers and programs for senior citizens. Additionally, Dr. Ludlum attained voting representation for students serving on the AACC's board of trustees and founded the Servicemember's Opportunity College at Fort George G. Meade.

Upon Dr. Ludlum's retirement in 1976, his successor, Dr. Justus D. Sundermann, served until 1979. He is credited with the establishment of AACC's Weekend College, cable television (media production) courses and contract education services. AACC's first off-site location in Glen Burnie and the Child Development Center in Arnold were opened during Dr. Sundermann's administration. Also under Dr. Sundermann, there were staff factions in contention with one another and enrollment was in decline. In 1978, some of AACC's female faculty members filed lawsuits against the community college and insurer Continental Casualty Company for alleged pay discrimination. The lawsuits were consolidated and received news coverage while Dr. Sundermann was president. The board subsequently voted against renewing his contract 1979. (The case was settled in 1989 in favor of the female faculty members, who were awarded $550,000 in retroactive pay.)

From 1979 until his retirement in 1994, Dr. Thomas E. Florestano put AACC on a path to unprecedented growth as it fourth president. Within that period, Anne Arundel County developed, AACC's campus expanded to 230 acres (0.93 km^{2}) and the Glen Burnie Town Center location opened. To further AACC's mission, Dr. Florestano supported the active recruitment of students, administrators and faculty members through marketing at mall booths, increased mail correspondence, a streamlined registration process and higher faculty wages. As a result of his efforts—including student retention programs and curriculum expansion through eight-week minimesters and more off-site program offerings—the community college saw enrollment grow from 13,000 to approximately 36,000 and the annual budget from $9 million to $33 million.

On August 1, 1994, Dr. Martha A. Smith became AACC's fifth president and focused on evolving the community college into one that would serve its community economically via the integration of academic and vocational education. AACC's senior administration was reorganized and the previously separate offices of academic affairs and workforce development were combined. During her tenure, tuition was kept affordable, AACC's number of degree programs grew twofold and the graduating class of 2012 was nearly double the size of that of 1996. AACC was nationally recognized as a leader in cybersecurity education, workforce training and for student excellence. Dr. Smith garnered state and county funding for campus construction and renovation projects, which led to the opening of additional off-site locations: a Sales and Service Training Center; the Regional Higher Education Center; the Hotel, Culinary Arts and Tourism Institute building and a Center for Cyber and Professional Training. After 18 years of service, Dr. Smith retired on August 1, 2012.

Dr. Dawn Lindsay was appointed the sixth president of Anne Arundel Community College in 2012.

=== Accreditation ===
AACC is accredited by the Middle States Commission on Higher Education (MSCHE). AACC's nursing programs have been accredited by the Accreditation Commission for Education in Nursing since 1970. The Maryland Board of Nursing awarded accreditation to the registered nursing program in 1966 and the practical nursing programs in 2006. The radiologic technology program has been nationally accredited by the Joint Review Committee on Education in Radiologic Technology since 1993. AACC's physical therapist assistant program has been accredited by the Commission on Accreditation in Physical Therapy Education since 1998.

In 2008, AACC's Department of Public Safety was nationally accredited through the International Association of Campus Law Enforcement Administrators (IACLEA) and became the first two-year institution in the United States to receive such an accreditation. The department was reaccredited in 2011 and 2014.

== Campus ==
The main campus is located in Arnold, Maryland, and spans 230 acres (0.93 km^{2}), making it the largest single-campus community college in the state. There are 10 academic buildings, a library, gymnasium, student services center, student union, 389-seat performing arts center, the Earl S. Scott Nature Trail and a 3,000-seat athletic field. AACC has more than 100 off-site locations across Anne Arundel County, including Arundel Mills; Fort Meade Army Education Center; Glen Burnie Town Center; the hotel, Culinary Arts and Tourism Institute; and the Sales and Service Training Center.

Anne Arundel Community College hosts Maryland's only statue of Martin Luther King Jr., which was rededicated in 2019.

In 2019, the groundbreaking ceremony for the Anne Arundel Community College Health and Life Sciences Building was held. The three-story, 175,000-square foot building, which opened in fall 2021, houses 19 biology labs, 11 health science labs, a 160-seat lecture hall, greenhouse, classrooms, computer labs, study/meeting rooms, tutoring and advising, and faculty and deans’ offices. It is one of a series of projects within AACC's 10-year plan to expand and host new programs.

The same year, AACC received a $1 million donation to support the expansion of its skilled trades program. The newly constructed Clauson Center for Innovation and Skilled Trades opened on the Arnold campus in January 2022, offering six programs and pre-employment services.

== Administration and organization ==
AACC operates under five schools: the School of Business and Law; the School of Continuing Education and Workforce Development; the School of Health Sciences; the School of Liberal Arts; and the School of Science, Technology and Education.

A typical academic year is broken up into two 15-week terms during the fall (August–December) and spring (January–May) as well as two accelerated terms that last four to six weeks during the winter (December–January) and summer (May–August). Within the terms are sessions that span 13 weeks, eight weeks and weekends. An academic year begins on the first day of the fall term and ends on the last day of the summer term.

AACC runs a program for high school students known as the Early College Access Program (ECAP) (formerly known as Jump Start). The program allows current high school students at partnering schools to take college courses.

AACC's endowment had a market value of approximately $7.8 million in the fiscal year that ended in 2019. The community college's special academic facilities include an astronomy lab and two art galleries.

== ROTC ==
AACC has crosstown agreements with the University of Maryland College Park (UMD) (Air Force and Army) and Bowie State University (BSU) (Army) for its Reserve Officer Training Corps (ROTC) program. The program is available to full-time AACC students in good academic standing. UMD and BSU's ROTC programs began in 1920 and 1974, respectively. They are home to Detachment 330 for the Air Force ROTC.

== Academics and programs ==
AACC has an open admissions policy and accepts life experience as credits. In addition to its associate and certificate degree programs, AACC offers enrichment courses for people of all ages through its Continuing Education, Gifted and Talented, homeschool, Kids in College, online, and weekend programs. AACC also offers summer camp programs for children.

The Entrepreneurial Studies Institute's Business Pitch Competition awarded $50,000 to student businesses in 2021. The winners were Annapolis Social League, Baked + Brunched Bakery, Prepared4Tech, RacalRx, Clover Run Riding, Chow, Coach Alex Ray, Müted Biergarten and Powered Puff Protection.

=== Rankings ===
- No. 1 Community College in the Country by Academic Influence in 2021.
- Community College of the Year by National Business Alliance in 2001
- Silver Rank, Association for Advancement of Sustainability in Higher Education, 2012.
- Great College to Work For, The Chronicle of Higher Education’s annual report, 2010, 2011, and 2012.

== Student life ==
=== Student body ===
As of fall 2020, AACC's student body consists of 35,362 students, including 3,188 full time and 8,760 part time students.

Demographics of student body in fall 2020
	Full and Part Time Students	U.S. Census (Note: People who identify as Hispanic/Latino are included in applicable race categories.)
International	1.3%	N/A
Multiracial American	5.6%	2.8%
Black/African American	17.1%	13.4%
American Indian and Alaska Native	0.2%	1.3%
Asian	4.7%	5.9%
Non-Hispanic White American	54.5%	60.1%
Hispanic/Latino American	9.3%	18.5%
Native Hawaiian and Other Pacific Islander	0.2%	0.2%
Other/Unknown	7.1%	N/A

=== Organizations ===
More than 80 student clubs and organizations operate at AACC, including student government, special interest and service organizations.

Cultural groups on campus include: Black History Month Committee, Experience Campus Ministries, Genders and Sexualities Alliance, Hispanic Heritage Month Committee, International Student Association, Japanese Language Club, Latinx Club and Students Out to Destroy Assumptions.

==== Publications ====
Amaranth Literary Magazine, a student-run journal published annually, features literary works by AACC students and alumni. The journal sponsors a weekly open mic event for students to share their work.

The Campus Current, AACC's independent student newspaper, originally circulated a monthly print edition, but has expanded to include a digital edition with daily posts available via its social media platforms.

== Athletics ==
In 1961, former high school basketball coach and local YMCA basketball director Dr. Johnny Laycock founded AACC's athletics program. He served as the program's director and chairman of the physical education department until he retired in 1986. Dr. Laycock led volleyball, the program's first intramural sport, at Severna Park High School, where academic courses were initially held. Basketball, wrestling and baseball followed.

Dr. Laycock is credited with significantly expanding AACC athletics during his tenure. By the early 1980s, the program had gained 12 full-time faculty, 22 varsity sports and had achieved NJCAA membership. AACC offered a sailing program for faculty and students. There were also continuing education programs for older adults: bicycling, rowing, aerobic dance, swimming and resistance training. Students were required to earn two physical education credits toward degree completion. With Dr. Laycock's input, the Arnold campus featured a newly constructed athletics complex with a gymnasium, outdoor stadium, tennis courts and fields for baseball, soccer, softball and lacrosse.

The AACC athletic teams, formerly known as the Fighting Pioneers, are collectively known as the Riverhawks. Because the mascot design for the Pioneers could not be decided, 1,000 AACC students, community members and alumni were presented with an online survey to select a new mascot. In December 2014, the majority of the votes cast determined that the AACC athletic teams would be called Riverhawks by fall 2015.

The AACC athletic association chairs 12 varsity athletic programs. The Riverhawks are members of the Maryland Junior College Athletic Conference (MDJUCO) and Region 20 of the National Junior College Athletic Association (NJCAA). Men's sports include: baseball, basketball, cross country, esports, golf, lacrosse and soccer. Women's sports include: softball, basketball, cross country, esports, lacrosse, soccer and volleyball.

AACC's teams have won four national championships in men's lacrosse (1998), women's softball (2003) and women's lacrosse (2006 and 2007).

=== Athletic facilities ===
Students and student-athletes are granted access to the on-campus fitness facilities in the David S. Jenkins Gymnasium at AACC's Arnold campus. Women's volleyball and men's and women's basketball home games are played at the gymnasium, which features a 650-seat capacity, six basketball hoops, two weight training facilities and the Riverhawk Athletic Training Facility. Siegert Stadium hosts men's and women's soccer and lacrosse home games. Softball home games are played at the Softball complex and baseball home games at “Skip” Brown Baseball Field. The three practice fields are available to the public during the day and for rent by external organizations when not in use by AACC. Student athletes and local cross-country high school students have access to the Riverhawk Cross Country Trails for meets, practice and conditioning.

== Notable alumni ==
- Brian Crecente, video game journalist, founder of Kotaku, podcaster
- C. Edward Middlebrooks, attorney, former Maryland senator
- David G. Boschert, former U.S. Marine and member of the Maryland House of Delegates
- Diane Black, former United States Representative and registered nurse
- Douglas B. Byerly, music director and founder of AACC's opera program
- Edward Snowden, former CIA employee and computer analysis subcontractor (attended but did not graduate from AACC)
- Robert A. Costa, former soldier, firefighter, EMT, real estate agent and member of the Maryland House of Delegates
- Robert R. Neall, former sailor, member of the Maryland House of Delegates, Maryland senator and state health official
- Robin P. Newhouse, dean of the Indiana University School of Nursing
- Ronald Malfi, horror novelist
- Travis Pastrana, motocross driver
- Pamela Beidle, former member of the Maryland House of Delegates and current member of the Maryland Senate
- Toni Braxton, American R&B singer, songwriter, actress and television personality
