= St. Margaret's, Maryland =

Settlement in Anne Arundel County, Maryland

Coordinates: 39.021°N 76.463°W

St. Margaret's is a suburb of Annapolis in Anne Arundel County, Maryland, United States on the scenic Broadneck Peninsula. The ZIP code is 21409.

== History ==
To the east of Annapolis, on the north shore of the Severn River, west of Whitehall Creek at Whitehall Bay and south of US Route 50 lies the St. Margaret's area, including the communities between Ridout, Burley, Minnow and Mill Creeks as well as along St. Margarets Road, Maryland Route 179.

Located on the west bank of Whitehall Creek are the present communities of Tanglewood, Whitehall Beach and Amberley previously part of a tract called Pleasant Plains. Much of these waterfront areas look onto the colonial plantation of Whitehall, located on the east bank of Whitehall Creek.

On the west of these communities is Beechwood on the Burley, Hidden Point and Milvale. The communities between Whitehall Creek and Mill Creek are all accessible from Pleasant Plains Road, a historic and scenic road that joins Route 179 at the location of St. Margaret's Episcopal Church.

To the southeast of Mill Creek are the communities of Brown's Woods Mulberry Hills, and Round View. Brown's Woods and Mulberry Hills are known as a historically black settlements. Located at the end of Forest Beach Road on Mill Creek is Cantler's Riverside Inn, the most popular restaurant in Maryland.

Providence, between Mill Creek and the U.S. Naval Academy Golf Course, was first settled in 1649 by the Puritans. The lands were later abandoned for the settlement of Annapolis due to its sheltered anchorage and deep water. The current area of Providence was acquired by Shepard and Vanous Builders in late 1962. The land was subdivided into 78 lots along with the clubhouse, swimming pool and marina.

On both sides of Ritchie Highway near the Maryland World War II Memorial is Pendennis Mount. Lands in St. Margaret's area stretch towards the Naval Academy, North Severn Complex with military family housing, golf course, marina and boat repair areas.

== Education ==
St. Margaret's is served by the Anne Arundel County Public School System.

Elementary schools:

- Windsor Farm Elementary

Middle schools:

- Severn River Middle School

High school:

- Broadneck High School

Private school:

- Harbour School

== Nearby communities ==
Though there are only two incorporated municipalities in Anne Arundel County, nearby locations to St. Margaret's include:

- Annapolis
  - United States Naval Academy
- Cape St. Claire
- Severna Park
