= Mark Budzinski =

American baseball player & coach (born 1973)

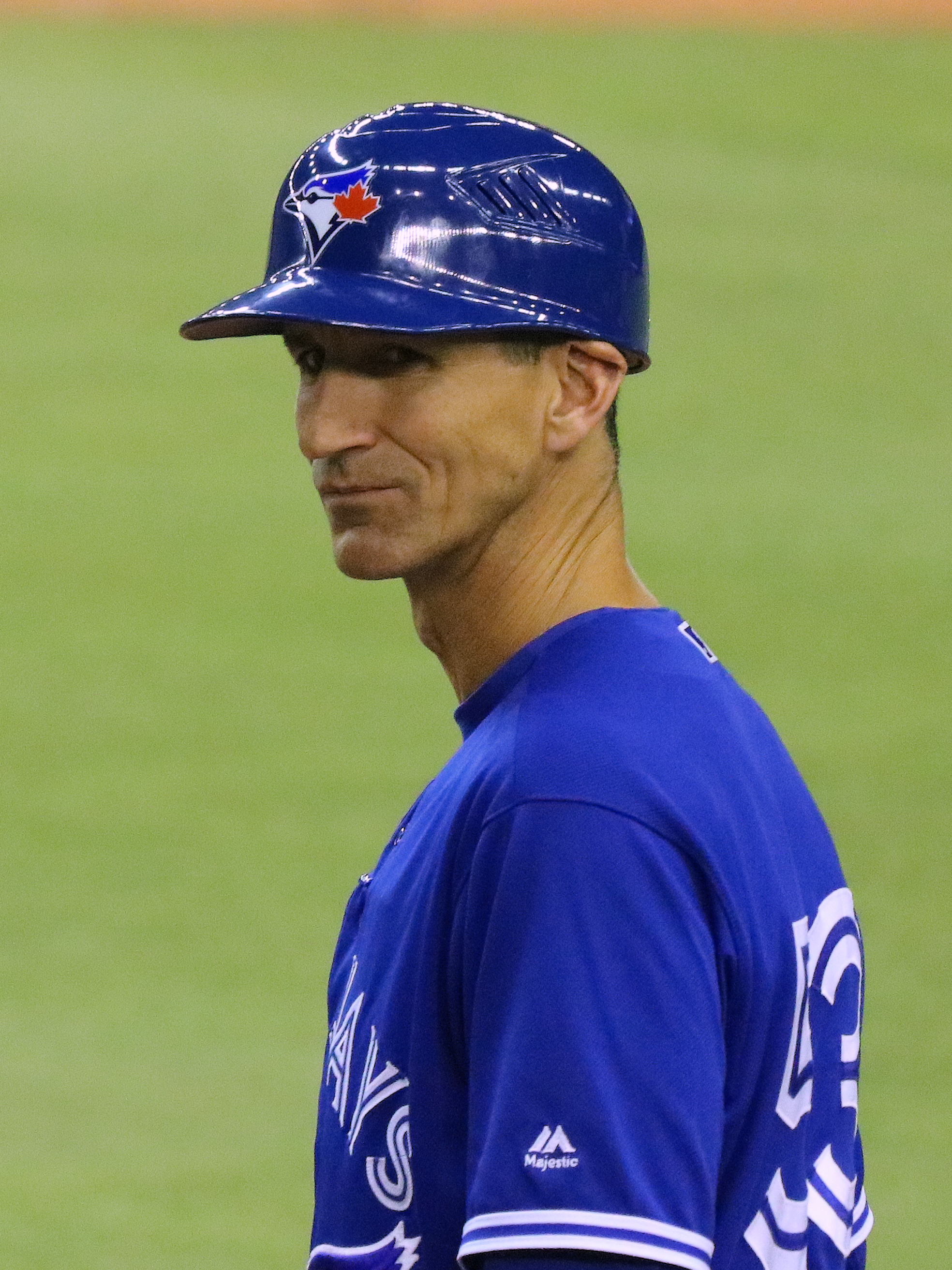
- Budzinski with the Toronto Blue Jays in 2019

Toronto Blue Jays – No. 53
- Outfielder / Coach
- Born: August 26, 1973 (age 53); Severna Park, Maryland, U.S.
- Batted: Left Threw: Left

MLB debut
- August 3, 2003, for the Cincinnati Reds

Last MLB appearance
- August 8, 2003, for the Cincinnati Reds

MLB statistics
- Batting average: .000
- Home runs: 0
- Runs batted in: 0
- Stats at Baseball Reference

Teams
- As player: Cincinnati Reds (2003); As coach: Cleveland Indians (2018); Toronto Blue Jays (2019–present)
Medals
Men's baseball
Representing United States
Baseball World Cup
Silver medal – second place	2001 Taipei	National team

Mark Joseph Budzinski (born August 26, 1973) is an American former Major League Baseball (MLB) outfielder who played with the Cincinnati Reds in 2003, and is currently the first base coach for the Toronto Blue Jays.

== Playing career ==
Budzinski attended Severna Park High School in Severna Park, Maryland. Budzinski played college baseball at the University of Richmond. In 1994, he played collegiate summer baseball with the Harwich Mariners of the Cape Cod Baseball League. The Cleveland Indians selected Budzinski in the 21st round of the 1995 MLB draft. Budzinski played professionally for 11 seasons, and he spent the 1997 campaign in the Carolina League as an outfielder for the Kinston Indians. After spending time in the Indians, Cubs, and Brewers systems, Budzinski made his Major League debut with the Cincinnati Reds on August 3, 2003. He appeared in four games before returning to the minor leagues. Budzinski retired in 2005 and returned to Richmond, Virginia to go into real estate.

== Post-playing career ==
Mark Budzinski returned to professional baseball in 2014 as the manager of the Lake County Captains. He then served as manager of the Lynchburg Hillcats in the 2015 and 2016 seasons, and the Akron RubberDucks in 2017. Budzinski was hired to the Cleveland Indians' major league coaching staff on December 11, 2017.

On November 26, 2018, Budzinski was hired as the first base coach for the Toronto Blue Jays.

== Personal life ==
Budzinski is married to Monica, with whom he raised three children (Joshua, Julia, and Lily Budzinski). His eldest daughter, Julia, died in July 2022, after a boating accident in the James River, near Glen Allen, Virginia, at the age of 17.
