= Severn Oaks Farm =

Welsh pony breeding farm in Arnold, Maryland

Coordinates: 39.0333°N 76.5134°W

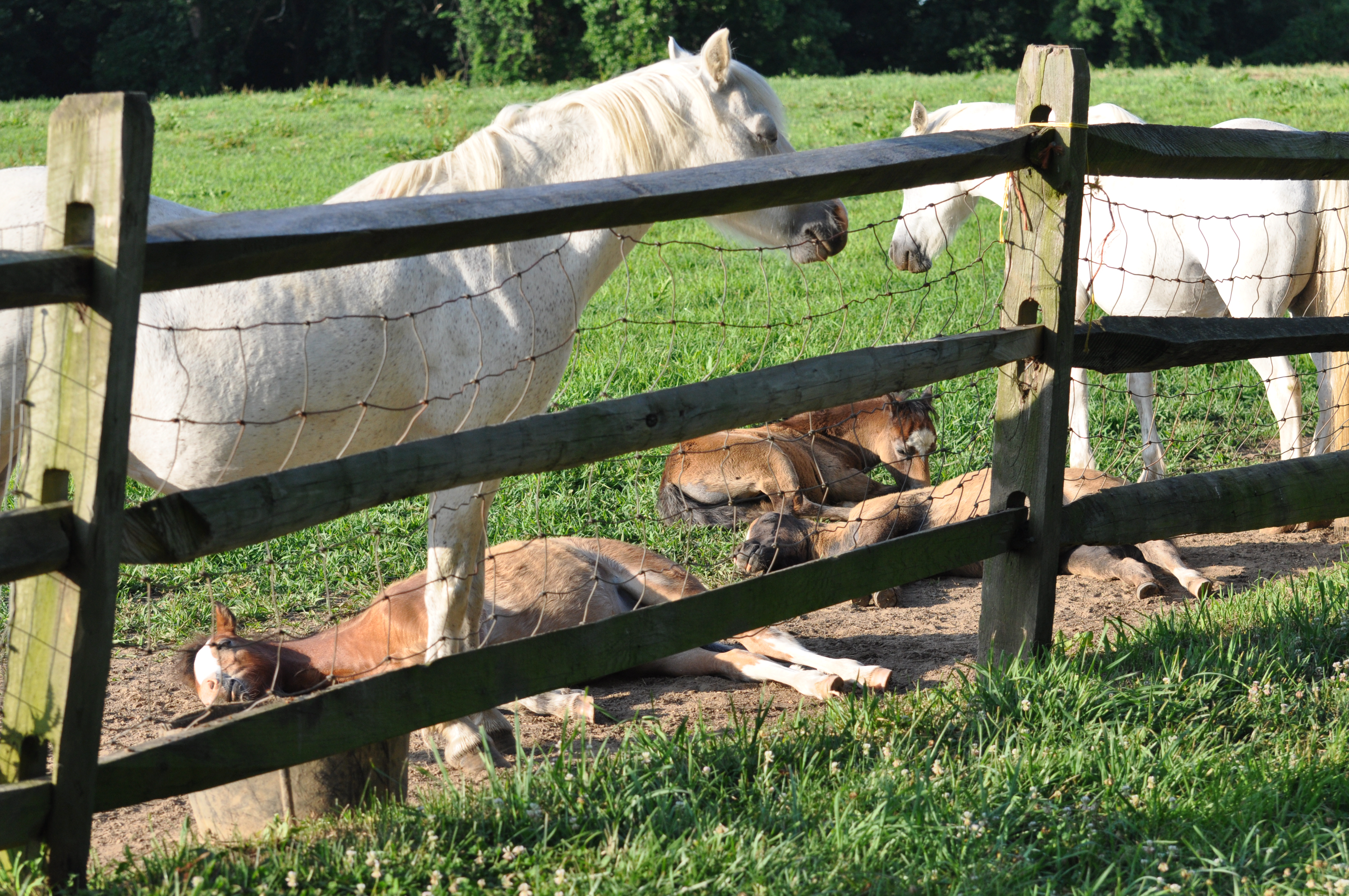
- Severn Oaks Welsh ponies
- Interactive map of Severn Oaks Farm
- Town/City: Arnold, Anne Arundel County, Maryland, United States
- Established: 1909; current ownership from 1943; breeding operations from 1947
- Area: 129 acres
- Website: https://www.severnoaks.farm

Severn Oaks Farm is a Welsh pony breeding farm in Arnold, Anne Arundel County, Maryland. Severn Oaks is first documented for a Severn River estate in 1909 that included frontage on Chase Creek. The modern equine operation is associated with Elizabeth H., and Charles E. Iliff, who purchased Severn Oaks in 1943 and began a Welsh pony breeding program in 1947, and with their daughter, Mary, who has operated the program since Elizabeth's death in 1985.

== Farm operations ==
=== Welsh pony breeding ===
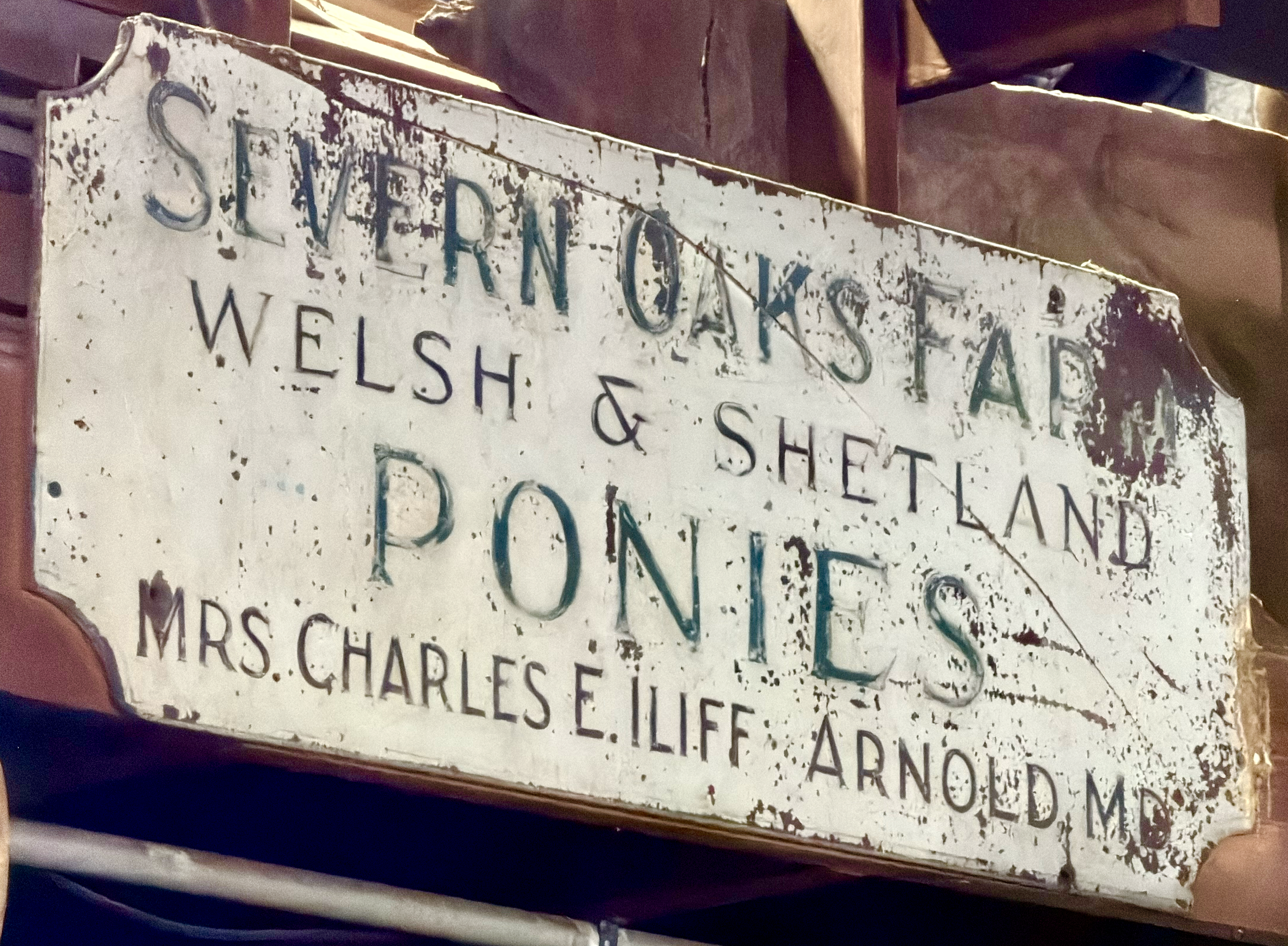
Original "Severn Oaks Farm" sign stored inside a farm barn

The Welsh pony breeding operation at Severn Oaks was founded in 1947. After acquiring the Welsh mare, Coed Coch Ebrill, Elizabeth Iliff contacted Margaret Brodrick of the Coed Coch in Wales and, in 1948, imported nine additional mares from the stud as the foundation of the Severn Oaks Welsh breeding program.

Shetland ponies and Arabian horses were also raised at the farm. In 1957, the Shetland pony stallion, Severn Firecracker, was grand champion of all Shetland ponies at the Maryland State Fair for the fourth consecutive year, and was owned jointly by Severn Oaks and Olney Pony Farm. In 1958, Severn Woodcock, a two-year-old Shetland stallion belonging to Severn Oaks, was declared grand champion pony of the breed at Timonium; Woodcock was described as a half-brother of Severn Firecracker.

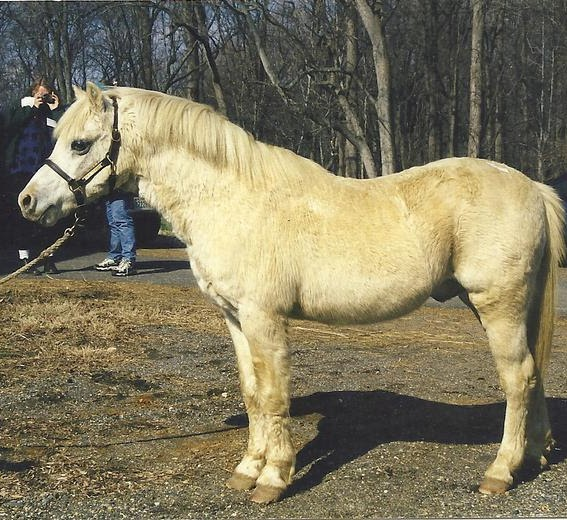
Severn West Wind

=== Severn West Wind ===
Severn West Wind was a Welsh pony stallion foaled in 1971 at Severn Oaks Farm and is regarded as the most influential sire produced by the farm's Welsh breeding program. He was bred from the Severn Oaks Welsh herd derived from imported Coed Coch bloodlines. West Wind was shown as a young stallion and was presented to the Welsh Pony and Cob Society of America (WPCSA) Section A Stallion Championship in 1978 before being retired from the show ring and standing at stud at Severn Oaks Farm. Over the course of his breeding career, Severn West Wind sired 127 registered foals. His offspring and later descendants competed extensively in Welsh pony halter, breeding, and performance divisions throughout the United States, establishing him as a prepotent sire within the American Welsh Mountain pony population.

In recognition of the sustained competitive success of his progeny, Severn West Wind was awarded the Welsh Pony and Cob Society of America Sire Legion of Merit in 1998. He remained at Severn Oaks Farm for his entire life and was buried on the property upon his death in February 2001.

=== Land ===
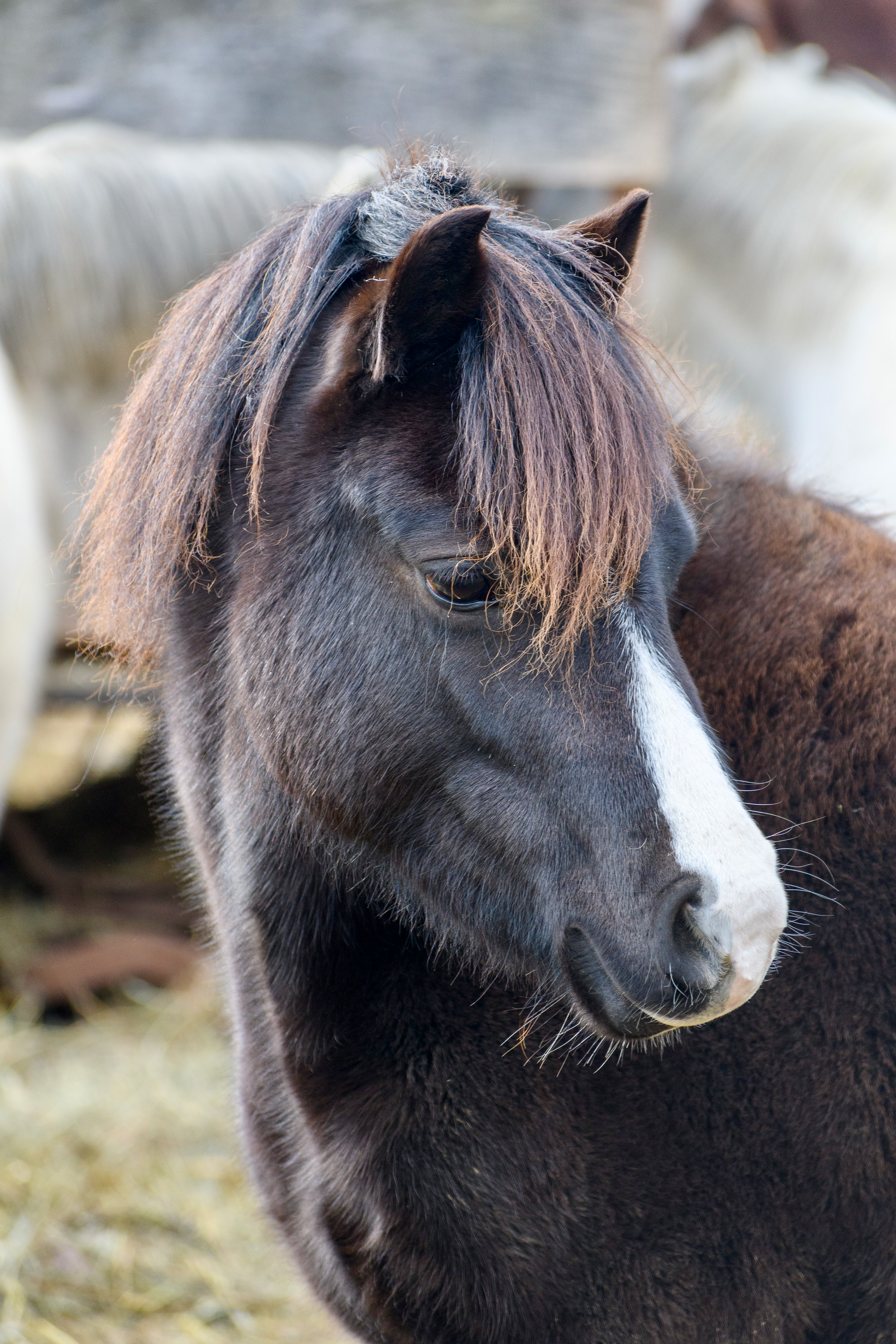
Welsh Pony at Severn Oaks Farm

The land of Severn Oaks Farm is the product of three centuries of Broadneck Peninsula agricultural land use layered through repeated cycles of division and consolidation. The land that became Severn Oaks Farm lies within the colonial grant known as Swan Neck, awarded in the mid-17th century to Edward Lloyd following Maryland’s 1652 treaty with the Susquehannocks.

Lloyd conveyed part of Swan Neck in 1659 to William Crouch, described as the first recorded resident of what is now the Joyce Lane area. In 1801, Hyde and Ray purchased roughly 695 acres of Swan Neck. Ray named his estate Rayland, operating it as a Severn River-oriented plantation, and named the adjoining pond Ray's Pond. A large portion of Rayland was purchased by Henry Joyce in the early 19th century. Joyce shipped his farmed produce to Baltimore by sail.

In 1840, Joyce divided Rayland between his sons Henry and Cyrus; Cyrus’s portion lay on what is now Joyce Lane and formed the nucleus of the later farm. As Cyrus’s heirs moved away from agriculture in the late 19th century, portions of the higher ground overlooking the river were sold and later developed for residential use, including the Briarcliff subdivision recorded in 1926 and the Ashby subdivision.

Severn Oaks is documented in local press in the early twentieth century through Samuel E. Egerton, Jr., of Roland Park in Baltimore. The Egerton family named their property “Severn Oaks” upon the 1909 purchase and maintained their estate until its purchase at auction after Samuel Egerton’s death by Charles and Elizabeth Iliff in 1943

Severn Oaks Farm as it stands today was assembled beginning with that 1943 acquisition, together with Joyce family parcels acquired during the 1940s through the 1960s, resulting in the present approximately 129 acres including adjacent family homesites.

== Chase Creek and Chase Creek Woods ==
The 1909 Baltimore Sun society column described Severn Oaks as having frontage on Chase Creek, a creek on the north shore of the Severn River in the Arnold area. The east woodlands of Severn Oaks Farm form part of the privately owned forest area known as Chase Creek Woods. The Eastern Native Tree Society field report Tall Trees of Chase Creek Woods by arborist Colby Rucker describes Chase Creek Woods in Arnold as a privately owned forest area studied for tree height and species records, reporting that approximately 150 acres of forest across privately owned tracts were measured and that the area includes multiple Maryland record-height trees.
