= Academic Influence =

Educational evaluation organization

Academic Influence is a U.S. based organization that provides college rankings. It ranks colleges and universities based on measurable academic impact, rather than institutional prestige. The platform offers a data-driven approach to educational evaluation.

== History ==
Academic Influence was established in 2020 by Jed Macosko, a Berkeley PhD and professor at Wake Forest University.

== Methodology ==
Academic Influence uses a ranking system called the 'Influence Ranking engine' to evaluate colleges and universities. The system includes key metrics such as "Concentrated Influence," which highlights the density of a university's academic impact, and the "Desirability Index," which assesses how desirable a school is by comparing which schools students choose when accepted into multiple universities. In addition to rankings, it offers tools designed to assist students in selecting majors and evaluating financial aid options.

== Notable Rankings ==
Academic Influence has introduced rankings in various areas, including:

- Campus Safety: Purdue University's West Lafayette campus was ranked as the safest in America. This ranking was based on factors such as compliance with the Clery Act, security features, crime statistics, and mental health services.
- Historically Black Colleges & Universities (HBCUs): The platform ranked what it considered the top 30 HBCUs from 2000 to 2020, with institutions like Howard University and Spelman College being recognized for their influence.
- Technological Advancement: Academic Influence recognized institutions like MIT, Stanford, and Carnegie Mellon as among "America's 15 Most Technologically Advanced Colleges".
- Liberal Arts and Online Programs: Swarthmore College was ranked as the best liberal arts college in the U.S. due to the organization's "Concentrated Influence" metric. The platform also ranked top online degree programs in fields like cybersecurity.
- Academic Stewardship: The platform introduced a ranking for academic stewardship, evaluating how colleges use their resources to achieve academic impact. Smaller institutions, including several HBCUs, ranked highly for their effective use of limited resources, with Fisk University leading the list.

== Limitations ==
A noted limitation of Academic Influence's methodology is its reliance on machine learning, which can occasionally produce outlier outputs or anomalies. This necessitates careful monitoring of the platform's database to identify and address ML/AI incongruences. Additionally, the methodology emphasizes academic impact, which may not always correspond directly with the demands of the job market. While the platform measures influence within academic circles, this does not necessarily translate to professional success or career outcomes for graduates. However, there is supporting evidence that indicates the research activity of professors positively correlates with teaching effectiveness and mentorship opportunities.
