= Arnold, Maryland =

- Census-designated place
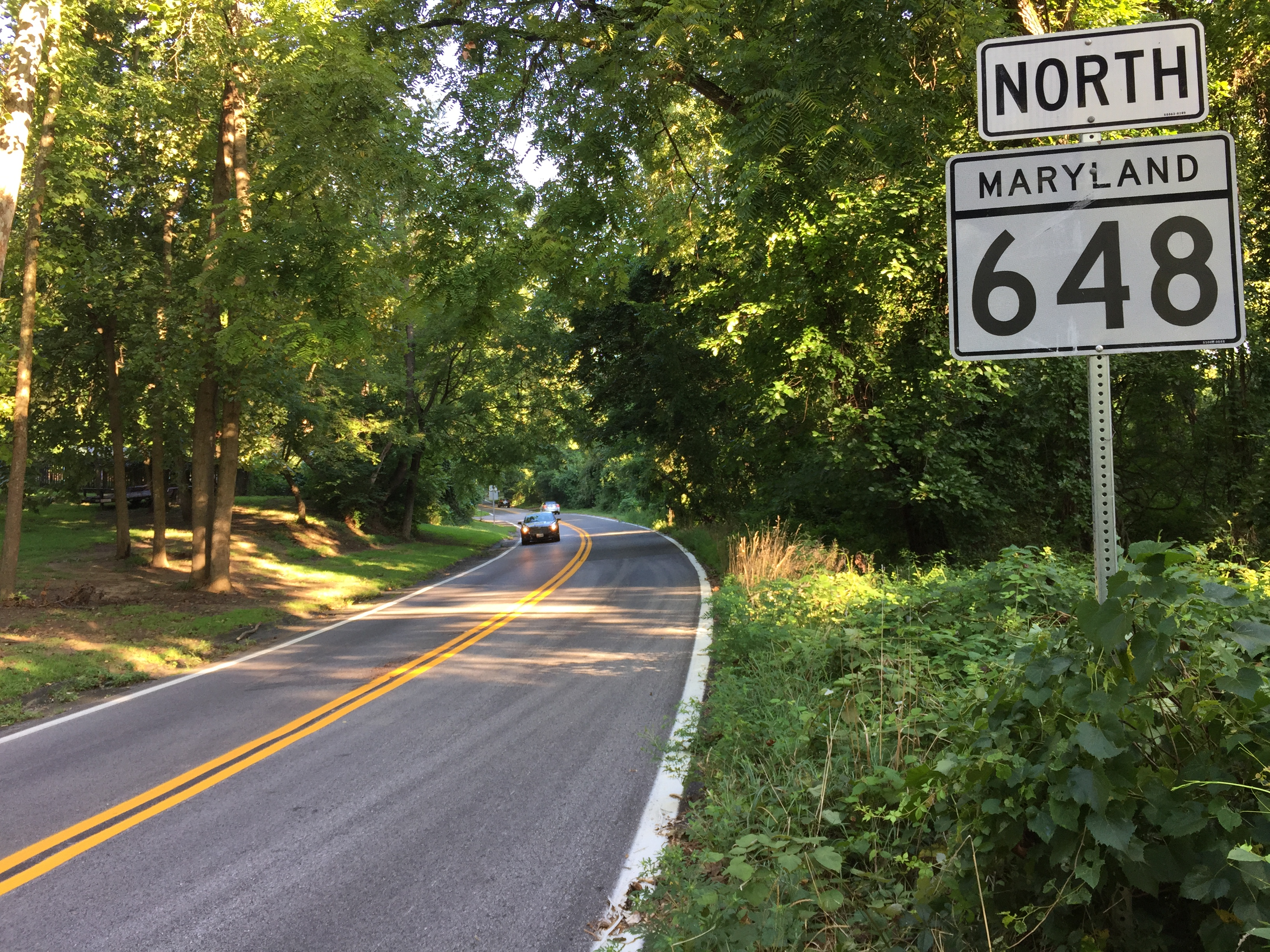
- Baltimore-Annapolis Boulevard in Arnold

- Location of Arnold, Maryland
- Coordinates: 39°01′55″N 76°30′10″W
- Country: United States
- State: Maryland
- County: Anne Arundel

Area
  - Total: 13.56 sq mi (35.11 km^{2})
  - Land: 10.82 sq mi (28.02 km^{2})
  - Water: 2.74 sq mi (7.09 km^{2})
- Elevation: 128 ft (39 m)

Population (2020)
  - Total: 24,064
  - Density: 2,224/sq mi (858.8/km^{2})
- Time zone: UTC−5 (Eastern (EST))
  - Summer (DST): UTC−4 (EDT)
- ZIP code: 21012
- Area code: 410
- FIPS code: 24-02275
- GNIS feature ID: 582920

Arnold, a census-designated place (CDP) in Anne Arundel County, Maryland, United States, located just outside of the state's capital, Annapolis. It is located 18.78 miles south of Baltimore, and 29.97 miles east of Washington, D.C. The population was 24,064 as of the 2020 census. Neighborhoods straddle College Parkway and Maryland Route 2 (Ritchie Highway). Arnold is located on the scenic Broadneck Peninsula. The ZIP code is 21012. It is bordered by Severna Park to the northwest, Cape Saint Claire to the southeast, Annapolis to the southwest, and Lake Shore (a CDP within Pasadena) to the northeast.

== History ==
Native Americans are known to have resided in the region in pre-Columbian times based on artifacts found in the Ulmstead Point area dating back to the Archaic period (5000–1500 BC). Later tribes that have been in the area include the Algonquin tribes, among others. Arrowheads and other artifacts have been found in the Briarcliff area. However, when Captain John Smith arrived in the area in 1608, he reported no Natives.

Following the establishment of Anne Arundell County (now Anne Arundel County) in 1650, much of the land that later became Arnold lay within a large proprietary land grant known as Swan Neck, which encompassed substantial portions of the Broadneck Peninsula. Governor William Stone granted Swan Neck to Edward Lloyd I, Commander of Anne Arundell County, and over time portions of the grant were subdivided and transferred. By the early nineteenth century, one such subdivision had become known as Rayland, an agricultural estate containing all of the frontage of what is now Arnold's along the Severn River, from the modern communities of Rugby Hall at the north to Pines-on-the-Severn at the south.

The early settlement of Arnold, an area between the Magothy and Severn rivers, began with the farm of John Arnold. He was a veteran of the War of 1812, who acquired 300 acres (1.2 km^{2}) on the north side of the Severn River. One of his sons, Thomas Arnold, inherited the land, later working as the local station master for the Baltimore and Annapolis Short Line Railroad.

Residents know the area to have been home to a racetrack in the present-day Revell-Downs planned community and even a rollercoaster and boardwalk in Mago Vista Beach.

== Education ==
Children in Arnold are served by the following public schools in the Anne Arundel County Public Schools district:

Elementary schools:

- Belvedere Elementary
- Broadneck Elementary
- Arnold Elementary
- Jones Elementary (Severna Park)
- Windsor Farm Elementary
- Cape St. Claire Elementary

Middle schools:

- Severn River Middle School
- Magothy River Middle School
- Severna Park Middle School (Severna Park)

High school:

- Broadneck High School
- Severna Park High School

Private schools:

- Arnold Christian Academy
- Severn School

Post-secondary:

- Anne Arundel Community College

== Geography ==
Arnold is located at 39°2′50″N 76°29′48″W (39.047263, −76.496552). It is 5 miles (8 km) north of Annapolis, the state capital, and 24 miles (39 km) south of downtown Baltimore.

According to the United States Census Bureau, the CDP has a total area of 13.6 square miles (35.1 km^{2}), of which 10.8 square miles (28.0 km^{2}) is land and 2.7 square miles (7.1 km^{2}), or 20.18%, is water, consisting of the tidal Severn (to the southwest) and Magothy (to the northeast) rivers.

== Demographics ==
Historical population
Census	Pop.	Note	%±
2010	23,106		—
2020	24,064		4.1%
U.S. Decennial Census

=== 2020 census ===
As of the 2020 census, Arnold had a population of 24,064. The median age was 40.4 years. 25.0% of residents were under the age of 18 and 16.0% of residents were 65 years of age or older. For every 100 females there were 94.8 males, and for every 100 females age 18 and over there were 92.5 males age 18 and over.

100.0% of residents lived in urban areas, while 0.0% lived in rural areas.

There were 8,684 households in Arnold, of which 37.3% had children under the age of 18 living in them. Of all households, 61.3% were married-couple households, 12.9% were households with a male householder and no spouse or partner present, and 21.0% were households with a female householder and no spouse or partner present. About 19.1% of all households were made up of individuals and 8.4% had someone living alone who was 65 years of age or older.

There were 9,064 housing units, of which 4.2% were vacant. The homeowner vacancy rate was 1.0% and the rental vacancy rate was 5.0%.

Racial composition as of the 2020 census
Race	Number	Percent
White	19,675	81.8%
Black or African American	1,138	4.7%
American Indian and Alaska Native	51	0.2%
Asian	785	3.3%
Native Hawaiian and Other Pacific Islander	16	0.1%
Some other race	442	1.8%
Two or more races	1,957	8.1%
Hispanic or Latino (of any race)	1,386	5.8%

=== 2010 census ===
As of the 2010 census, there were 23,106 people, 8,373 households, and 6,578 families residing in the CDP. The population density was 2,168.7 inhabitants per square mile (837.3/km^{2}). There were 8,989 housing units at an average density of 798.4 per square mile (308.3/km^{2}). The racial makeup of the CDP was 88.65% White, 5.23% African American, 0.23% Native American, 2.41% Asian, 0.03% Pacific Islander, 1.16% from other races, and 2.28% from two or more races. Hispanic or Latino of any race were 3.97% of the population.

There were 8,373 households, of which 40.2% had children under the age of 18 living with them; 63.8% were married couples living together, 9.5% had a female householder with no husband present, and 23.6% were non-families. 4.6% had someone living alone who was 65 years of age or older. The average household size was 2.76 and the average family size was 3.15.

In the CDP, the population was spread out, with 25.31% under the age of 18, 6.1% from 18 to 24, 30.6% from 25 to 44, 26.9% from 45 to 64, and 8.6% who were 65 years of age or older. The median age was 37 years. For every 100 females, there were 93.9 males. For every 100 females age 18 and over, there were 90.1 males.

=== Income ===
According to a 2019 estimate, the median household income was $126,310.

== Land use and natural features ==
Tall Trees of Chase Creek Woods

Chase Creek Woods in Arnold is the tallest privately owned woodland known in the eastern United States, having an index of 130.19 feet (39.68 m) for the ten tallest species. The variety of habitat supports large examples of nearly fifty native tree species. Chase Creek Woods is home to twelve of the tallest of their species on record in Maryland. The 2003 Rucker study indicates that Chase Creek Woods is an important natural area worthy of protection. Despite development over the last 50 years, Chase Creek Woods is one of the county's outstanding natural areas and, according to Rucker, has been undisturbed since at least the early 20th century.

== Farming and agriculture ==
Although Arnold is now largely suburban, agriculture played a significant role in the area’s development and continues to be part of its heritage. From the seventeenth through the early twentieth centuries, much of the Broadneck Peninsula was used for agricultural estates and riverside farming.

Historically, Arnold comprised numerous farms along both the Severn and Magothy rivers. Spriggs Farm, located on the Magothy River, encompassed approximately 400 acres in the 1870s and supported dairy and field crops into the late twentieth century; by 2008, only 55 acres of the original tract remained, but community efforts were underway to preserve the property amid suburban development.

A remaining example of local farming is Severn Oaks Farm, established circa 1909, which includes a portion of the Chase Creek Woods forest. Severn Oaks Farm, which encompassed up to 140 acres in the 1970s, is currently a 114-acre portion of the historic Swan Neck land grant that has been continuously farmed since at least 1801. It has been owned and farmed by the present family since 1943 and is known for a Welsh pony breeding program begun in 1948.

== Local attractions ==
Arnold contains many scenic riversides with cliffs and beaches, providing plenty of places for leisure and sightseeing. There are 12 marinas in Arnold. The Baltimore-Annapolis Bike Trail links Arnold to Annapolis and Severna Park with jogging and biking recreation. Arnold Park hosts a playground and provides open ball fields for sporting. Twin Oaks Park provides play equipment and a walking trail. Broadneck Park is located on the peninsula east of Arnold; this park has two enclosed areas for dogs (small and large). Bay Hills Golf Club was designed in 1969 by renowned golf course architect Ed Ault. The scenic 18-hole golf course finds its beauty in its wooded rolling terrain.

Arnold is located 5 miles (8 km) from downtown Annapolis. Sandy Point State Park is 5 miles (8 km) east of Arnold and includes a beach on the Chesapeake Bay in proximity to the Chesapeake Bay Bridge and the Sandy Point Lighthouse. Marshes and creeks in the park are home to wildlife found throughout the Chesapeake Bay, including blue crabs, herons, terrapins, rockfish, and eagles.

Anne Arundel Community College is located in Arnold along College Parkway, and is annually rated one of the top community colleges in the nation. Historic synagogue Temple Beth Shalom also calls Arnold its home.

Maryland's State Tree

The Wilmer Stone White Oak in Arnold Park is set to be dedicated as the Maryland State Tree. The 200-year-old tree scored 402 points under a system that awards points for a tree's height, circumference and crown. It was named for the late Wilmer Stone, a noted forester who once owned the Arnold Park property where it stands. With a height of 128 feet (39 m), a crown spread of 83 feet (25 m) and a circumference of 253 inches (6,400 mm), the resulting score of 402 is higher than for any other white oak in Maryland. The Wilmer Stone White Oak now stands as the Maryland Champion of its species. As such, it is now eligible to become the official State Tree. A portion of the oak was destroyed in 1988, making it jut out to the side in a broken Y formation, or it would have surpassed the National Champion in Virginia, a 427 pointer. The honored tree stands proudly in the silent Arnold forest, broken only by the calls of ospreys, wrens, blue jays and cardinals. Deer and fox also populate the woodlands, darting among the black locust trees, wild grape vines and Virginia creeper.

Dr. Martin Luther King Jr. Memorial

Dr. King's memorial is the first in Maryland to be erected in his honor. It stands in Arnold's Anne Arundel Community College's west campus on a well-maintained terrace overlooking an outdoor amphitheater. Behind the statue, five bronze plaques mounted on a stone wall quote King's speeches calling for equal opportunities in education and a just society. The statue is nine feet six inches tall and mounted on a five-foot granite base.

== Notable people ==
- Diane Black, congresswoman
- Matthew Centrowitz Jr., Olympic track and field gold-medal winner

== In popular culture ==
- A season 5 episode of the Discovery Channel series A Haunting, titled "Angels and Demons," takes place in Arnold in 2010–2011.
