= St. Margaret's Episcopal Church (Annapolis, Maryland) =

St. Margaret’s Episcopal Church
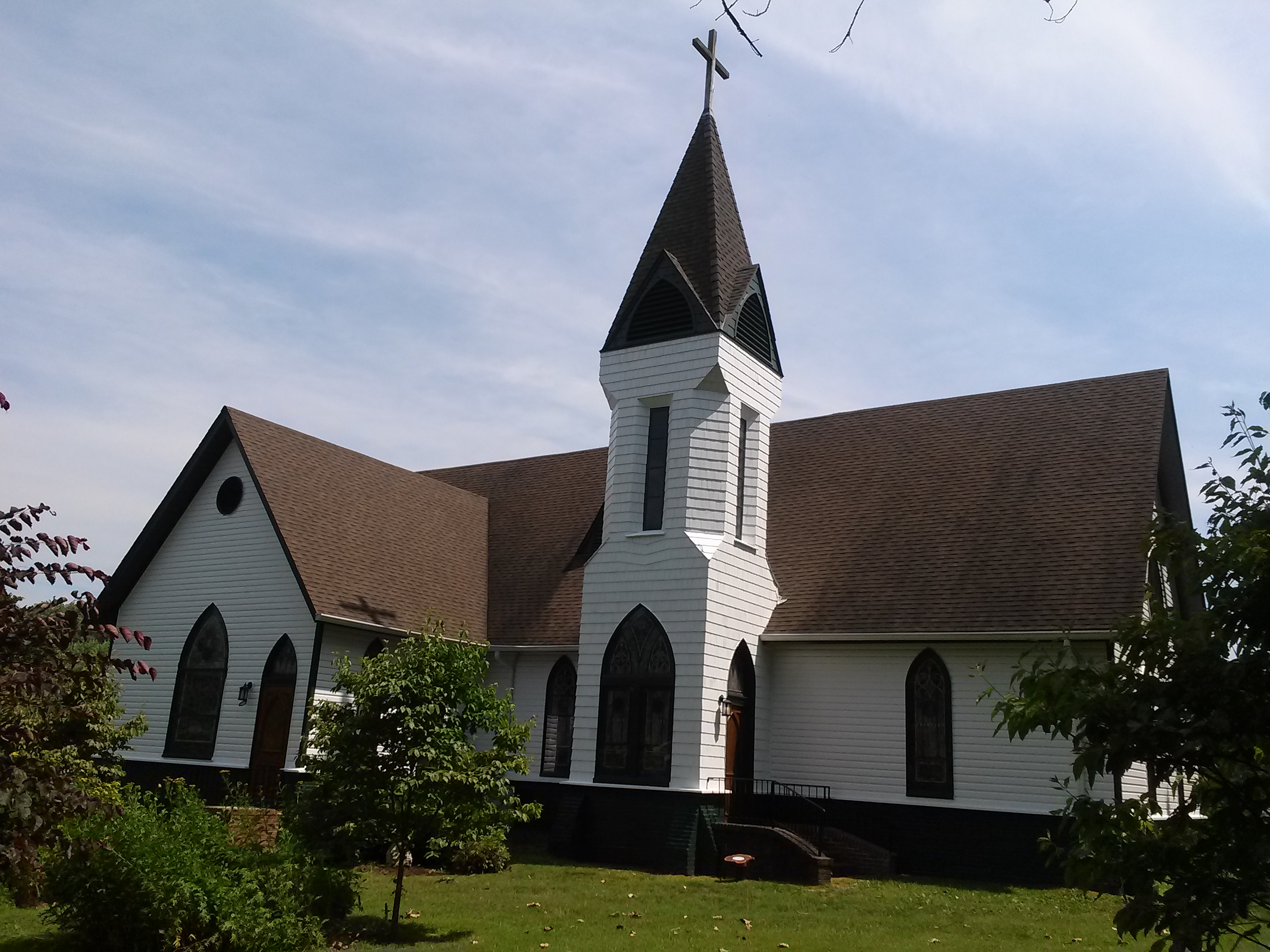
- St. Margaret’s Episcopal Church
- 39°1′14.5″N 76°27′45.5″W
- Location: 1601 Pleasant Plains Road, Annapolis, Maryland
- Country: United States
- Denomination: Episcopal
- Website: http://www.st-margarets.org

History
- Founded: 1692
- Dedication: St. Margaret of Antioch — Virgin Martyr

Architecture
- Style: Carpenter Gothic
- Completed: 1692

Administration
- Province: III
- Diocese: Maryland
- Parish: Westminster or Broad Neck

Clergy
- Rector: The Rev. Peter W. Mayer

St. Margaret's Episcopal Church is a historic Carpenter Gothic style Episcopal church building in St. Margaret's, Annapolis, Anne Arundel County, Maryland. Established in 1893 on the brick foundation of a previous church building, it is the fourth building constructed to serve Broad Neck Parish (later known as Westminster Parish), which was established in 1692 as one of the 30 original Anglican parishes in colonial Maryland

St. Margaret's Episcopal Church is still an active parish in the Episcopal Diocese of Maryland. Since 1900, four parish halls have been built on the campus, including the existing parish hall constructed in 1970 and significantly improved over the years. Two rectories have been built on the campus and the surviving 1960 rectory became rental property then administrative offices. The parish completed a $4 million formation and pre-school building in 2015.

The Rev. Peter W. Mayer is the current rector.
