= Broadneck High School =

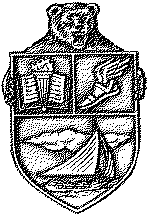

Location
- 1265 Green Holly Drive; Annapolis, Maryland 21409; United States; 39°2′21″N 76°27′12″W

Information
- Type: Public, Coeducational
- Motto: Bold, Ready, United, Innovative, Never Gives Up (B.R.U.I.N.)
- Established: 1982
- School district: Anne Arundel County Public Schools
- Principal: Katherine Smith
- Teaching staff: 108.47 (FTE)
- Grades: 9–12
- Enrollment: 2,233 (2020–2021)
- Student to teacher ratio: 18.1
- Campus: Large suburb
- Colors: Maroon, Grey, and White
- Nickname: Bruins
- Newspaper: Tribruin
- Yearbook: Kaleidoscope
- Website: www.broadneck.org

Broadneck High School is a school in the United States, located in Anne Arundel County, Maryland, on Green Holly Drive, on the border between Arnold and Cape St. Claire, suburbs of Annapolis. The Bruin is the school's mascot. Broadneck is part of the Anne Arundel County Public Schools system and known for the breadth of its Advanced Placement program, among its higher-level courses such as Linear Algebra. It has been the test school for courses such as Calculus III and offers options to take classes at the nearby Anne Arundel Community College and CAT-South schools. The current BHS feeder middle schools are Severn River Middle School and Magothy River Middle School.

== History ==
In the 1970s, nearby Severna Park High School was beginning to become overcrowded and was the only high school that served students on the Broadneck Peninsula at the time. In an attempt to solve overcrowding at Severna Park, Anne Arundel County Public Schools built Broadneck High School, which opened in January 1982 for students in grades 10–12, and had a total of 310 students. The first principal was Lawrence E. Knight. The school chose its mascot as the Bruins and its colors as maroon, grey, and white, and the football stadium was named in honor of principal Lawrence E. Knight. In 1987, Broadneck began to experience overcrowding, and as a result, portable classrooms were added to the side of the school. An auditorium was also added to the school, a gravel pit was added near the softball fields to build more room for student parking, and Broadneck athletics were added to the Anne Arundel County league. A fire occurred in the English department, resulting in the hospitalization of a teacher. Broadneck also became a smoke free school in 1987. In 1996, a large construction/expansion project began on the school building to allow room to add 9th graders to the school and in 1998 the project was finished and Broadneck opened its doors to its first freshman class. In 2010, a two-story wing extension was added to the building. In 2017 the school unveiled a newly renovated athletics field house. It was named in honor of the school's first athletic director Tim McMullen.

== Students ==
Broadneck High School's attendance area includes all of the neighborhoods in Annapolis’ 21409 zip-code and most of the neighborhoods in the adjacent CDP of Arnold. Children residing in Arnold who live west of Governor Ritchie Highway and north of Joyce Lane attend Severna Park High School. The Broadneck cluster's high school boundaries have remained unchanged since Anne Arundel County Public Schools' last county-wide school redistricting that took place in 1995 and resulted in the Belvedere Elementary School attendance area being moved from the Severna Park High School feeder system to the Broadneck High School feeder system. The addition of these new neighborhoods to the Broadneck feeder system prompted major additions and renovations to Broadneck, including the main entrance and administrative sections, as well as D-wing. These projects completed in 1997. There have been attempts in recent years to change elementary school boundaries in the Broadneck cluster to alleviate overcrowding, but a redistricting proposal in early 2020 that would have moved students from the overcrowded Broadneck Elementary School to the less crowded Cape St. Claire Elementary School was voted down by school board members.

Broadneck's Performing Visual Arts (PVA) magnet program is open to all students residing within Anne Arundel County. Those accepted to the program who live outside of Broadneck's attendance area become Broadneck High School students and receive bus transportation to and from school. Thus, Broadneck has students from all the high school clusters in Anne Arundel County.

== Demographics ==
The demographic breakdown of the 2,233 students enrolled for the school year 2020–2021 was as follows:

- Male – 49.2%
- Female – 50.8%
- Native American/Alaskan – 0.4%
- Asian/Pacific islander – 2.8%
- Black – 7.0%
- Hispanic – 10.5%
- White – 73.2%
- Multiracial – 5.8%

== Academics and rankings ==
Broadneck High School consistently ranks among the top high schools in Maryland and the nation.

- In 2018, Newsweek ranked Broadneck as one of the top 20 high schools in Maryland and top 1,000 in the country. In 2013, Broadneck received the highest rank by Newsweek out of all public High Schools in Anne Arundel County. Further, Broadneck High School also ranked among the top 300 high schools in the country by The Washington Post and among the top 10 high schools in Maryland
- In 2018, the Maryland State Department of Education began assigning schools star ratings. Each school can earn up to 5 stars based on its overall scores, which were calculated from measures related to academic performance and how well it serves its students from disadvantaged backgrounds. In the latest 2019 star ratings, Broadneck High School received 4 out of 5 stars. Broadneck's two feeder middle schools, Severn River and Magothy River Middle Schools, also received a 4 out of 5 star rating. All but one of Broadneck's feeder elementary schools received 5 out of 5 star ratings. Arnold, Cape St. Claire, Belvedere, and Winsdor Farm Elementary Schools received 5 out of 5 star ratings; Broadneck Elementary School received a 4 out 5 star rating. Collectively, schools in the Broadneck feeder system overall had the second best scores of any feeder system in Anne Arundel County, with Severna Park being first.
- Broadneck High School has been named one of the Washington, D.C., area's most challenging high schools by the Washington Post, which examined AP course participation at different high schools in the Washington, D.C., area.
- Broadneck is an Advanced Placement Certified school. Broadneck was also named an Anne Arundel County Public Schools Advanced Placement Distinguished High School in 2004, 2005, and 2006.
- Broadneck High School offers 30 different AP classes, exceeding the state average of 18 AP classes and the county's average of 24 AP classes.

== Athletics ==
Broadneck High School's athletics teams are the Bruins and Lady Bruins and their colors are maroon and grey.

- Girls Cross Country
- Boys Cross Country
- Field Hockey
- Girls Soccer
- Volleyball
- Girls Basketball
- Boys Swimming and Diving
- Wrestling (BWKA)
- Baseball
- Girls Lacrosse
- Boys Lacrosse
- Softball
- Football
- Sailing
- Bowling
- Golf
- Tennis
- Sideline Cheer
- Bocce

== Notable alumni ==
- Brooks Barnard – Former NFL punter
- Matthew Centrowitz, Jr. – 2012 & 2016 Olympian; Gold medal in 1500m in 2016
- Farrah Hall – Olympic yachting
- Christian Siriano- Winner and host of Project Runway
