= Broadneck Peninsula =

Area in Maryland, United States

Coordinates: 39°2′15″N 76°28′40″W

The Broadneck Peninsula is a peninsula in Anne Arundel County, Maryland. The peninsula is bounded by the Severn River to its south, the Magothy River to its north, and the Chesapeake Bay to the east. At the lower end of the Broadneck Peninsula is the 4.3 mile Chesapeake Bay Bridge.

== History ==
Broadneck is the site of Anne Arundel County's first European settlement in 1649. The first settlers were Puritans from Virginia who were invited by Maryland's proprietary ruler, Cecilius Calvert, 2nd Baron Baltimore, to settle on the western shore of the Chesapeake Bay. They established a dispersed hamlet at the mouth of the Severn River which they called "Providence" or "Severn", centered on the north shore of the Severn, between Greenberry Point and Hackett's Point. It was abandoned around 1670 in favor of Annapolis harbor. During this time, the area formed by Mill and Whitehall Creeks was known as "Broadneck", a name which later was applied to the entire peninsula.

By the late 17th century, the hamlet of Providence had expanded up the Broadneck Peninsula, with plantations occupying much of the interior land.

Throughout the 18th and 19th centuries the land use of the Broadneck area remained rural, supporting large plantations of tobacco and diversified crops. Annapolis served as the market center for these farms.

The African-American community of Mulberry Hills was established after the Civil War for freed slaves who had lived and worked in the area prior to the war. Similar to Brown's Woods on the north shore of Mill Creek, Mulberry Hill was subdivided into approximately 5-acre subsistence farms.

== Communities ==
The Broadneck Peninsula comprises several settlements and census-designated places, including Arnold, Cape St. Claire, and St. Margaret's. Two postal Zip Codes are assigned to the peninsula: Annapolis, 21409 and Arnold, 21012. The physical peninsula also includes most of Severna Park, 21146.

== Education ==
Broadneck is served by the Anne Arundel County Public School System.

Elementary schools:

- Broadneck Elementary
- Belvedere Elementary
- Arnold Elementary
- Cape St. Claire Elementary
- Windsor Farm Elementary
- Jones Elementary

Middle schools:

- Severn River Middle School
- Magothy River Middle School

High schools:

- Broadneck High School

Private schools:

- Chesapeake Academy

Colleges:

- Anne Arundel Community College: Located in Arnold along College Parkway

== Parks and trails ==
Sandy Point State Park: Located on the Broadneck Peninsula, this recreational park provides access to beaches and picnic areas that overlook the Chesapeake Bay. The main marina has 22 boat launching ramps for boats and personal water craft.

Baltimore & Annapolis Trail: a rail trail connecting Annapolis to Glen Burnie and passing through Arnold.

Broadneck Peninsula Trail: The first phase of the development of this planned 8.7 mile east-west recreational trail began in 2012. When completed, the trail will link Sandy Point State Park with the B&A Trail in Arnold. The park will also provide links to Anne Arundel Community College, elementary and middle schools, Broadneck High School, Broadneck Library, and community parks. The section will be a part of the American Discovery Trail.

Broadneck Park: This park contains baseball fields, a children's playground, a jogging trail and a dog park. The dog park has two enclosed areas for dogs.

== Historic landmarks ==
Wroxeter on Severn: Built for chemical magnate Edwin Pugh Baugh in 1909, this 22 room mansion was built in a Tudor revival style.

Whitehall: Erected for Governor Horatio Sharpe, Whitehall Mansion was built between 1764 and 1765 on a 1,000 acre estate overlooking Whitehall Bay.

== Waterways ==
- Magothy River (North Shore)
- Severn River (South Shore)
- Chesapeake Bay (East Shore)

North Shore (Upriver to downriver)

- Dividing Creek
- Mill Creek
- Cool Spring Creek
- Forked Creek
- Scheider's Cove
- Deep Creek
- Little Magothy
- Podickery Creek

South Shore (Upriver to downriver)

- Ringgold Cove
- Asquith Creek (Aisquith Creek)
- Ray's Pond
- Chase Creek
- Cool Spring Cove

Whitehall Bay (west to east)

- Mill Creek & Burley & Little Burley Creeks
- Providence Creek
- Minnow Creek
- Martin's Cove
- Whitehall Creek & Ridout Creek
- Meredith Creek & Jacks Cove
- Moss Pond (entrance eroded, looks like two coves)
- Westinghouse Bay (S of US 50 near Bay Bridge)
- Shorts Creek & Mezick Pond (N of US 50, creek leads to pond with marina)
