= Severna Park High School =

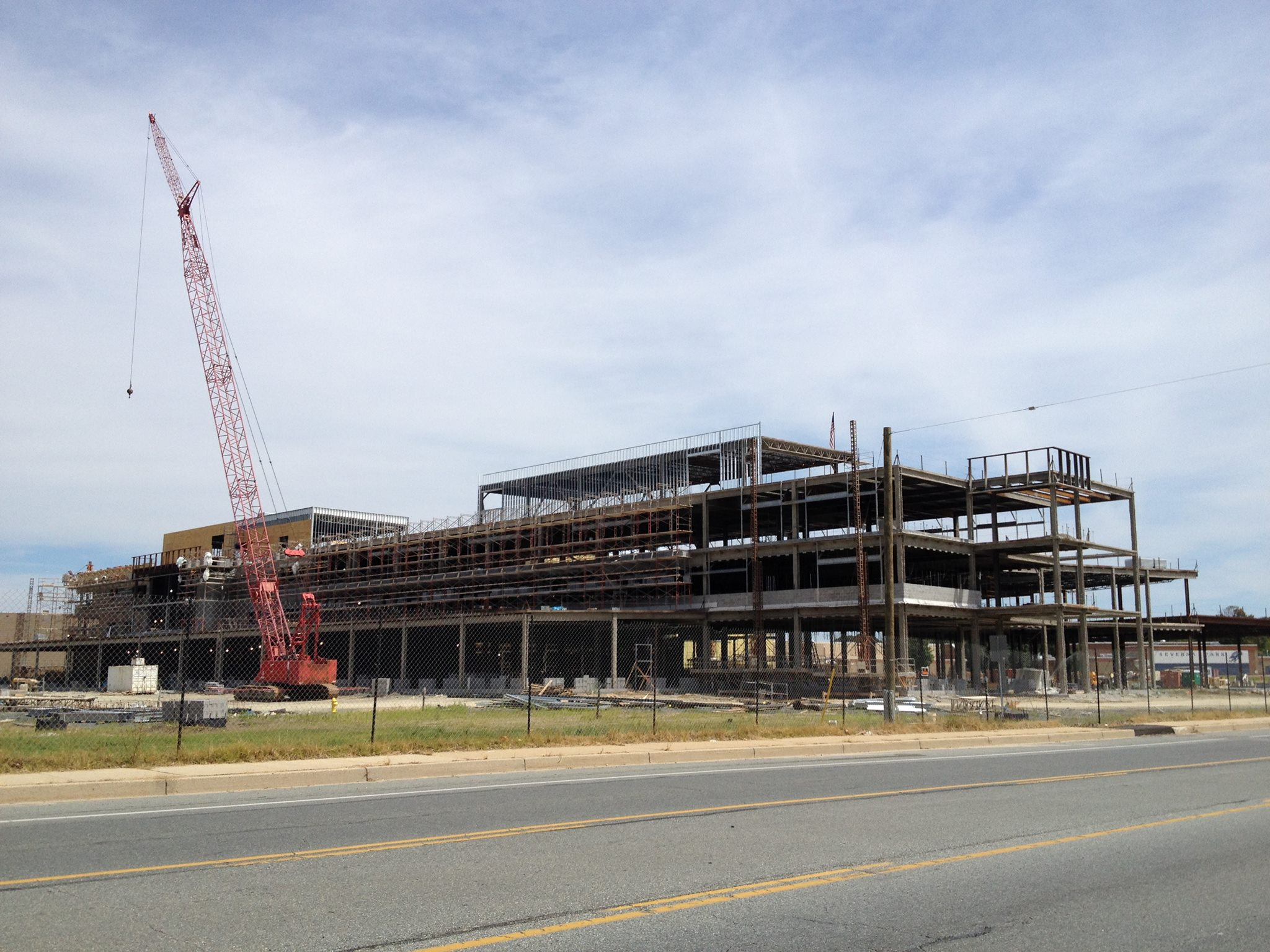
- Under Construction: August 2015

Location
- 60 Robinson Rd; Severna Park, Maryland; United States; 39°4′37″N 76°33′39″W

Information
- Type: Public high school
- Established: 1959; 67 years ago
- School district: Anne Arundel County Public Schools
- CEEB code: 210943
- NCES School ID: 240006000127
- Principal: Nathan Johnson
- Teaching staff: 97.48 FTE (2022-23)
- Grades: 9–12
- Gender: Co-educational
- Enrollment: 1,873 (2022-23)
- Student to teacher ratio: 19.21 (2022-23)
- Campus: Large suburb
- Colors: Blue, gold, and white
- Mascot: Falcons
- Rival: Broadneck High School
- Newspaper: The Talon
- Website: www.severnaparkhigh.org

Severna Park High School is a public high school located in the suburban CDP of Severna Park, Maryland, United States. It is part of the Anne Arundel County Public Schools system.

SPHS opened its doors to students in 1959 and was the seventh public high school opened in Anne Arundel County. A new school was built on the same grounds, and opened in January 2017. The Falcons are sports rivals with nearby Broadneck High School.

== Students ==
Severna Park High School has one feeder middle school: Severna Park Middle School, which has 6 feeder elementary schools: Benfield Elementary School, Folger Mckinsey Elementary School, Jones Elementary School, Oak Hill Elementary School, Severna Park Elementary School, and Shipley's Choice Elementary School. Although it is named Severna Park High School, some portions of Millersville, Arnold, and Pasadena are also zoned for Severna Park High School and its feeder schools, while the neighborhood of Riverdale in the eastern edge of Severna Park is zoned for Chesapeake High School and its feeder schools. Severna Park High School's boundaries have remained unchanged since 1995 after Anne Arundel County Public Schools conducted a county-wide school redistricting to handle overcrowding at schools across the county. The redistricting resulted in Belvedere Elementary School in Arnold being moved out of Severna Park High School's feeder system and into Broadneck High School's feeder system.

== Academics and rankings ==
Severna Park High School has often been ranked highly in a number of publications over several years. Severna Park High School was ranked among the top 10 high schools in Maryland and the top 300 - 400 high schools in the country by U.S. News & World Report in 2012, 2013, 2015, and 2020. The first year that U.S. News released high school rankings, 2012, Severna Park High School was ranked as the number one high school in the entire Baltimore region and number 211 in the United States. U.S. News included Anne Arundel County Public Schools, Howard County Public Schools, Baltimore County Public Schools, Carroll County Public Schools, Baltimore City Public Schools, Harford County Public Schools, and Queen Anne’s County Public Schools as being part of the Baltimore region. In 2020, U.S. News ranked Severna Park as the third best high school in the Baltimore region, the ninth best school in the state of Maryland, and number 403 in the United States.

In 2011, Severna Park High School was named both a National and Maryland Blue Ribbon school.

In 2018, the Maryland State Department of Education began assigning star ratings to schools in the state. In 2019, Severna Park High School and all the other schools within the Severna Park feeder system received a 5/5 star rating. Severna Park’s ratings were among the best in the state of the Maryland.

In 2020, GreatSchools gave Severna Park High School a 10/10 score in terms of racial equity and said that the school is successfully closing the academic achievement gap between white students and disenfranchised ethnic minority students. Black and Asian students’ test scores and performance at the school were rated a 10/10, and Hispanic students’ performance at the school were rated a 8/10, the same as that of white students. However, the school has notable equity issues when it comes to low-income students’ scores and performance.

== Academic competition ==
=== It's Academic! ===
Severna Park High School It's Academic competes in a regional game show against outstanding students from other high schools. The team has been the top Anne Arundel County team in back-to-back years and has also reached the Baltimore semifinals in 2015, 2016, and the finals in 2017.

=== Mock trial ===
The school's mock trial team has won the state championships in 2006, 2008, 2010, and 2015.

The mock trial team has been a powerhouse in the county for many years and did not lose in county competition until 2009. In their 2010 run to the State Championship, the mock trial team went undefeated. The team reached the State Championship level in 2015 after being undefeated in the county and regional competitions, and won.

== Athletics ==
- Girls' Soccer: 6 State championships (1989, 1990, 1995, 2000, 2002, 2003)
- Boys' Soccer: 3 state championships (1983, 2001, 2013)
- Field Hockey: 25 state championships (1979, 1980, 1981, 1986, 1987, 1992, 1993, 1994, 1995, 1997, 1998, 1999, 2000, 2003, 2005, 2006, 2007, 2008, 2009, 2011, 2013, 2014, 2015, 2019, 2021)
- Ice Hockey: 1 State Championship (2012)
- Girls' Lacrosse: 15 State championships (1990, 1991, 1992, 1993, 2000, 2001, 2007, 2008, 2009, 2010, 2012, 2014, 2015, 2019, 2024)
- Boys' Lacrosse: 19 State championships (1977, 1978, 1979, 1981, 1982, 1999, 2004, 2006, 2007, 2010, 2016, 2017, 2018, 2019, 2021, 2022, 2023, 2024, 2025)
- Girls' Softball: 3 State championships (1987, 2003, 2018)
- Girls' Track and Field: 1 State championship (1978)
- Girls' Indoor Track: 1 State Championship (1977)
- Boys' Indoor Track: 1 State Championship (1973)
- Girls' Swimming: 3 State championships {2007, 2009, 2010}
- Boys' Swimming: 2 State championships (2010, 2011)
- Girls' Cross Country: 6 State championships (1987, 1998, 2005, 2006, 2009, 2018)
- Boys' Cross Country: 6 State championships (2012, 2013, 2014, 2017, 2018, 2021)
- Volleyball: 6 State championships (1976, 1978, 1991, 1992, 1993, 2014)
- Baseball: 3 State championships (2003, 2005, 2009)

=== Special Olympic teams ===
Severna Park has three teams for special education students and other students to act as helpers. In the fall they have unified tennis, in winter they have unified bowling, and in the spring they have unified bocce.

== Notable alumni ==
- Josh Banks, former Major League Baseball player from 2007 to 2010
- Steve Bisciotti, majority owner of the Baltimore Ravens since 2004
- Mark Budzinski, former Major League Baseball player, current first base coach for the Toronto Blue Jays
- James W. Campbell, former member of the Maryland House of Delegates
- Tim Cochran, mathematician
- Tony Dokoupil, broadcast journalist for CBS
- Lauren Faust, animator and creator of My Little Pony: Friendship is Magic
- Ronald Malfi, horror novelist
- Billy Martin, guitarist and keyboardist for Good Charlotte
- Jackson Merrill, Major League Baseball player for the San Diego Padres
- Evan Mendoza, Former Minor League Baseball player
- Eric Milton, Former Major League Baseball player
- Rachel Muñoz, Maryland state delegate
- Adam Parker, Roman Catholic bishop
- Trey Smack, Professional Football player for the Green Bay Packers
- Jarred Tinordi, professional hockey player drafted 22nd overall in the 2010 NHL entry draft
- Cathy Vitale, Circuit Court Judge for Anne Arundel County, and a Maryland state delegate
