= Cape St. Claire, Maryland =

- Census-designated place
- Location of Cape St. Claire, Maryland
- Coordinates: 39°2′34″N 76°26′44″W
- Country: United States
- State: Maryland
- County: Anne Arundel

Area
  - Total: 2.53 sq mi (6.55 km^{2})
  - Land: 2.00 sq mi (5.18 km^{2})
  - Water: 0.53 sq mi (1.37 km^{2})
- Elevation: 82 ft (25 m)

Population (2020)
  - Total: 9,179
  - Density: 4,588.9/sq mi (1,771.77/km^{2})
- Time zone: UTC−5 (Eastern (EST))
  - Summer (DST): UTC−4 (EDT)
- ZIP: 21409
- Area codes: 410, 443
- FIPS code: 24-12912
- GNIS feature ID: 0589888

Cape St. Claire, a suburb of Annapolis, is a covenanted, unincorporated community as well as a census-designated place (CDP) in Anne Arundel County, Maryland, United States. While the community of Cape St. Claire lies entirely within the CDP and accounts for approximately 80% of the homes and residents, the CDP also includes the smaller communities of Atlantis, Walnut Ridge, Green Holly, and St. Claire Court. The population of the CDP was 8,747 at the 2010 census.

Contained within Cape St. Claire are three marinas, multiple parks and beaches, a shopping center, Broadneck High School, Broadneck Library, Cape St. Claire Elementary School, The Harbour School, and Cape St. Claire Swim Club. Fire protection is provided by the Cape St. Claire Volunteer Fire Company. There are many churches located in the community including: Broadneck Baptist Church, Cape St. Claire United Methodist Church and Christ Our Anchor Presbyterian Church and Saint Andrew By the Bay Roman Catholic Church.

== Geography ==
Cape St. Claire is located at 39°2′34″N 76°26′44″W (39.042910, −76.445623). The CDP is bounded to the east by the Little Magothy River, to the north by the Magothy River, to the west by Deep Creek, and to the south by College Parkway. U.S. Route 50 runs just to the south of the CDP, leading west 7 miles (11 km) to Annapolis and east 3 miles (5 km) to the Chesapeake Bay Bridge.

According to the United States Census Bureau, the CDP has a total area of 2.5 square miles (6.5 km^{2}), of which 2.0 square miles (5.2 km^{2}) is land and 0.54 square miles (1.4 km^{2}), or 20.72%, is water.

== Demographics ==
Historical population
| Census | Pop. | Note | %± |
|---|---|---|---|
| 2000 | 8,022 | | — |
| 2010 | 8,747 | | 9.0% |
| 2020 | 9,179 | | 4.9% |
U.S. Decennial Census

=== 2020 census ===
As of the 2020 census, Cape St. Claire had a population of 9,179. The median age was 39.2 years. 24.9% of residents were under the age of 18 and 14.7% of residents were 65 years of age or older. For every 100 females there were 96.0 males, and for every 100 females age 18 and over there were 92.4 males age 18 and over.

100.0% of residents lived in urban areas, while 0.0% lived in rural areas.

There were 3,364 households in Cape St. Claire, of which 38.5% had children under the age of 18 living in them. Of all households, 59.9% were married-couple households, 12.8% were households with a male householder and no spouse or partner present, and 22.2% were households with a female householder and no spouse or partner present. About 19.5% of all households were made up of individuals and 8.8% had someone living alone who was 65 years of age or older.

There were 3,474 housing units, of which 3.2% were vacant. The homeowner vacancy rate was 0.9% and the rental vacancy rate was 3.7%.

Racial composition as of the 2020 census
| Race | Number | Percent |
|---|---|---|
| White | 7,536 | 82.1% |
| Black or African American | 377 | 4.1% |
| American Indian and Alaska Native | 26 | 0.3% |
| Asian | 241 | 2.6% |
| Native Hawaiian and Other Pacific Islander | 12 | 0.1% |
| Some other race | 180 | 2.0% |
| Two or more races | 807 | 8.8% |
| Hispanic or Latino (of any race) | 571 | 6.2% |

=== 2000 census ===
As of the 2000 census, there were 8,022 people, 2,857 households, and 2,179 families residing in the CDP. The population density was 4,066.9 inhabitants per square mile (1,570.2/km^{2}). There were 2,932 housing units at an average density of 1,486.4 per square mile (573.9/km^{2}). The racial makeup of the CDP was 92.98% White, 3.84% African American, 0.11% Native American, 1.13% Asian, 0.07% Pacific Islander, 0.65% from other races, and 1.21% from two or more races. Hispanic or Latino of any race were 2.13% of the population.

There were 2,856 households, out of which 41.7% had children under the age of 18 living with them, 62.5% were married couples living together, 10.3% had a female householder with no husband present, and 23.7% were non-families. 18.2% of all households were made up of individuals, and 6.2% had someone living alone who was 65 years of age or older. The average household size was 2.79 and the average family size was 3.19.

In the CDP, the population was spread out, with 28.6% under the age of 18, 6.4% from 18 to 24, 32.7% from 25 to 44, 25.2% from 45 to 64, and 7.1% who were 65 years of age or older. The median age was 36 years. For every 100 females, there were 98.3 males. For every 100 females age 18 and over, there were 93.1 males.

The median income for a household in the CDP was $72,000, and the median income for a family was $76,657. Males had a median income of $50,133 versus $32,212 for females. The per capita income for the CDP was $27,009. About 1.4% of families and 2.6% of the population were below the poverty line, including 2.2% of those under age 18 and 13.7% of those age 65 or over.

== History ==
The area that was to become Cape St. Claire was mostly farmland until the 1940s. In the late 18th century, much of the land was operated as farmland by a couple of families. Two houses from this era remain—the "Stinchcomb House" located near the Cape St. Claire clubhouse, and Goshen Farm, located on a hill near the Cape St. Claire Elementary School.

In the early part of the 20th century, Hugh H. Young, a prominent doctor on the staff of Johns Hopkins University, began buying up the farmland with the intention of building a community. Dr. Young's first attempt, a community called Persimmon Point, was less than successful, with only a few lots being sold. This failure was brought on by the Great Depression, and the project was put on hold. Upon Dr. Young's death, his children created the River Bay Company to manage the property for development.

The River Bay Company platted the community of Cape St. Claire (incorporating the Persimmon Point property as part of the new community) on June 14, 1949. The community was envisioned and sold as a summer retreat for residents of Washington, D.C., and Baltimore. To manage the affairs of the new community, the River Bay Company created and incorporated the Cape St. Claire Club, governed by a Board of Governors. The first meeting of the Board of Governors of the Cape St. Claire Club (renamed the Cape St. Claire Improvement Association on May 12, 1959) was held on June 30, 1949. The Board consisted of three representatives of the River Bay Company named in the Cape St. Claire Club certificate of incorporation: John G. Rouse Jr.; James C. Morton Jr.; and George W. Baker Jr. James C. Morton was elected chairman.

In April 1989, the Anne Arundel County Council approved the formation of the Cape St. Claire Special Community Benefits District. The SCBD allows the community to establish a taxing district. The taxes are collected by the county government (as part of the property tax), which are then turned over to the Improvement Association to administer as voted on by the property owners in the community. This special benefits district has allowed the community to purchase additional common property, build a specially designated fishing/crabbing pier, make improvements to community assets, and hire off-duty county police for additional security.

== See also ==
- St. Margaret's, Maryland
