= Baltimore Highlands station =

Baltimore Light Rail station in Halethorpe, Maryland, US

Baltimore Highlands
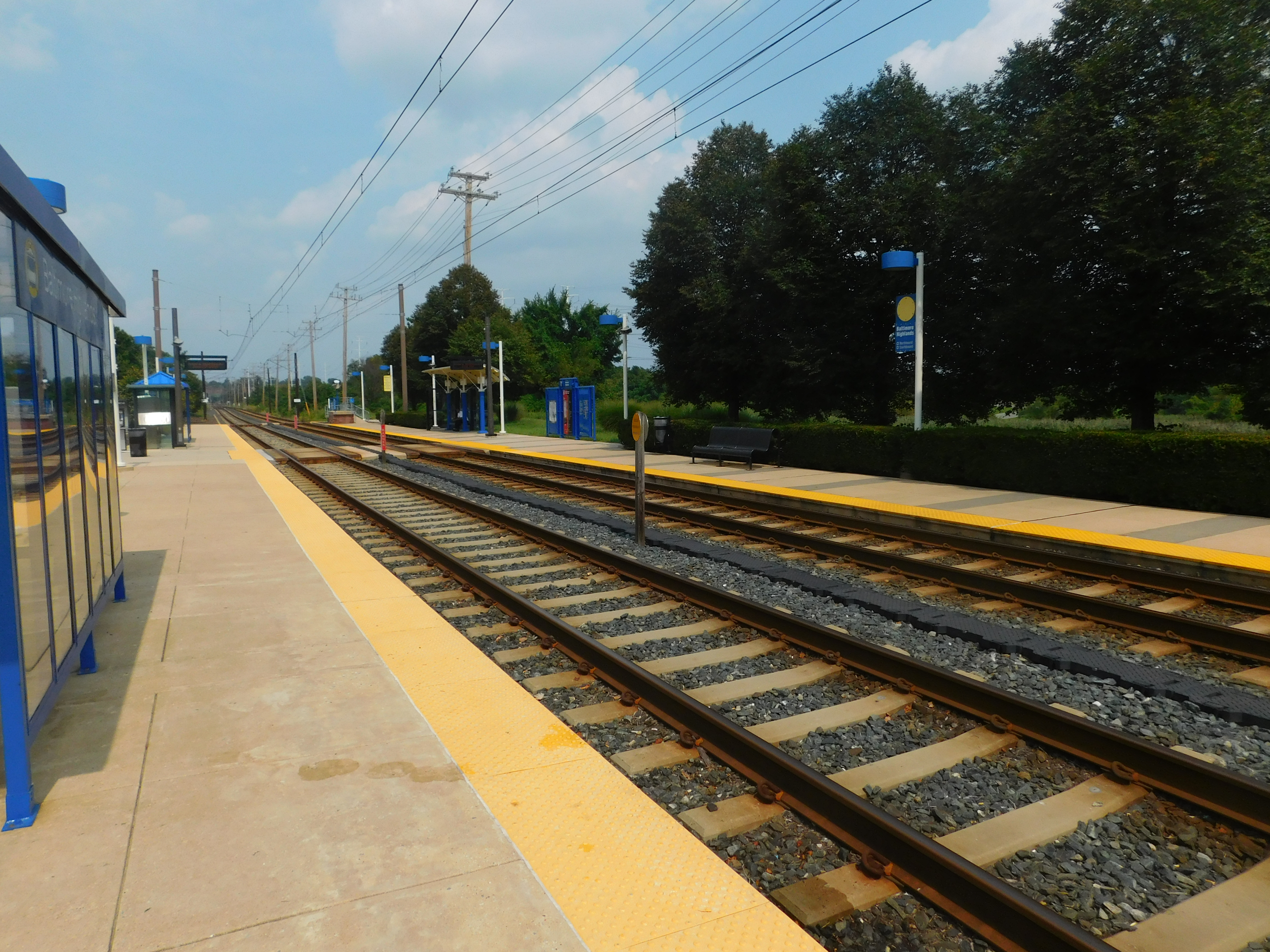
- Baltimore Highlands station in August 2018.

General information
- Location: 4215 Baltimore Street; Halethorpe, Maryland
- Coordinates: 39°14′6.4″N 76°37′58.5″W
- Owner: Maryland Transit Administration
- Platforms: 2 side platforms
- Tracks: 2

Construction
- Parking: 50 free spaces
- Accessible: Yes

History
- Opened: 1887 (B&A Railroad)
- Rebuilt: 1993

Passengers
- 2017: 269 daily

Services
Preceding station	Maryland Transit Administration	Following station
Nursery Road toward BWI Airport or Glen Burnie	Light RailLink	Patapsco toward Hunt Valley
Location

Baltimore Highlands station is a Baltimore Light Rail stop in Halethorpe, Maryland. There are currently 50 free parking spaces. There are no bus connections at this station.

The Baltimore Highlands stop currently does not have any bus lines operating directly around the station, though buses do operate on Annapolis Road nearby. When the station opened in 1993, it was served by Route 30, but complaints from area residents forced buses to be diverted to the nearby Patapsco stop, where they operate today.

The stop is located on Baltimore Street between Florida and Georgia Avenues, north of the site of the former Baltimore and Annapolis Railroad station between Georgia and Illinois Avenues, which was across from the Washington, Baltimore and Annapolis Electric Railroad station. It is also located near a model airplane club called the South West Area Park model air flying field.

== Station layout ==
G
G	Side platform, doors will open on the right
G	Southbound	← Light Rail toward BWI Airport or Glen Burnie (Nursery Road)
G	Northbound	Light Rail toward Fairgrounds or Hunt Valley (Patapsco) →
G	Side platform, doors will open on the right
G	Street level	Exit/entrance
