= Annapolis and Elk Ridge Railroad =

Rail service in Maryland, US (1837–1935)

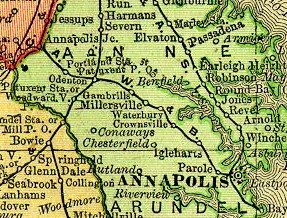
- 1890 map showing the A&ER, by then the AW&B

Overview
- Headquarters: Annapolis, Maryland
- Locale: Annapolis Junction, Maryland, to Annapolis, Maryland
- Dates of operation: 1837–1935

Technical
- Track gauge: 4 ft 8 1/2 in (1,435 mm) standard gauge
- Previous gauge: marks=

The Annapolis and Elk Ridge Railroad was a railroad that operated from 1840 to 1935. One of the country's earliest railroads, it connected Annapolis, Maryland, to the Baltimore and Ohio Railroad's Washington Branch. Reorganized in 1886 as the Annapolis, Washington and Baltimore Railroad, it was acquired in 1903 by the Washington, Baltimore & Annapolis Electric Railway. It was abandoned in 1935.

Today, the right-of-way is now primarily used as a utility corridor, with roads and trails on some sections. Remnants include some bridges, a few small sidings, and two short sections of rail, of which one is still in use.

== Annapolis and Elk Ridge Railroad ==
=== Independent railroad ===
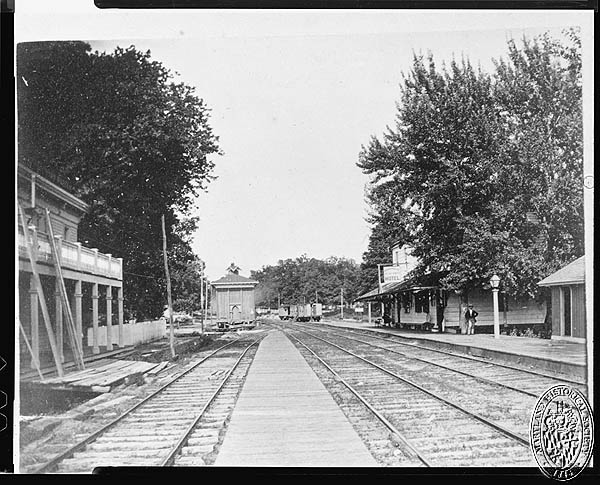
Annapolis Junction, where the A&ER met the B&O

==== Origins ====
In 1835, the Baltimore and Ohio Railroad (B&O) opened its Washington Branch, connecting its main line just outside Baltimore to Washington, D.C. In 1836, the Maryland General Assembly voted to sponsor construction of a rail line to serve the state capital in Annapolis; on March 21, 1837, a charter was granted to the Annapolis and Elk Ridge Railroad for that purpose.

Initial plans called for the line to begin at Elkridge Landing—in what was then western Anne Arundel County and is today eastern Howard County—so the line would connect not only with the B&O but also with the Patapsco River port. Instead, the line started at a point named Annapolis Junction near Savage Factory, near milestone 18 on the Washington Branch.

Construction started on June 12, 1838, finishing on December 25, 1840, for $405,658.65 with, $300,000 of which came from the state. Service was inaugurated on 26 December 1840 at 6 am out of the West Street station in Annapolis with fares of $2 to Baltimore, $2.50 to Washington, D.C., and local stations at 6 1/4 cents per mile. The railroad was single-tracked along most of its length and followed the drainage divide (or crest) into the Severn River on the north and the Patuxent River basin to the south. There were trestles spanning Chandlers Run and Rouges Harbor Branch and an excavation at Magazine Hill, just east of Waterbury. On 18 May 1841, a fire in the engine house at Annapolis damaged both engines, fueled by wood stored in the same building. Service was restored by July.

In the late 19th century, Elk Ridge changed its name to Elkridge, and the railroad did likewise, becoming the Annapolis & Elkridge Railroad. Crownsville, Millersville, and later Odenton are other present-day towns that were served by the railroad.

During the Civil War, the railroad had strategic significance and was the scene of a minor conflict early in the war. The Union's Massachusetts Infantry was moving south to secure Washington, D.C., but Maryland, a slave state, contained many southern sympathizers and when the troops attempted to march through the city the Baltimore riot of 1861 broke out. Troops were subsequently shipped by ferry to Annapolis, where they attempted to use the railroad to reach Washington via Annapolis Junction. On April 21, 1861, the telegraph lines, railroad engine and many sections of track had been torn up by Marylanders dissatisfied with the outcome of the riot. The tracks and engine were soon repaired by troops under the command of General Benjamin Franklin Butler.

The industrial era saw a major expansion of railroads into the area. The Pennsylvania Railroad-controlled Baltimore and Potomac Railroad was built in the 1870s to compete with the B&O and opened in 1872. The A&ERR was used to deliver materials for the construction of the B&P and the two built a junction connecting them, with the B&P running regular service to Annapolis.

The junction of the B&P and the Annapolis & Elkridge roughly five miles east of Annapolis Junction, became the town of Odenton (named for B&P president and Maryland governor Oden Bowie).

Near Millersville, the A&ERR line was crossed by the uncompleted Baltimore and Drum Point Railroad between 1873 and 1891.

==== Bankruptcy ====
In October 1879, the Maryland Board of Public Works began to investigate why, in 40 years, the railroad had not paid any of the interest on the state's $300,000 investment. The A&ER management blamed competition from ferry boats and high interchange tariffs charged by the Baltimore and Ohio.

In 1884 the railroad's private stockholders sued to force the sale of the railroad to recover part of their investment. The state attempted to prevent the sale, but in July 1885 the injunction they had obtained was dissolved and on November 10 of that year the Annapolis and Elkridge Railroad was sold for $100,000.

== Annapolis, Washington & Baltimore Railroad ==
=== Reorganization ===
The railroad was reorganized on March 24, 1886, and rechartered as the Annapolis, Washington & Baltimore Railroad (AW&B) with power granted to expand to multiple locations throughout the state.

A new railroad, the Bay Ridge and Annapolis Railroad, began operation on July 10, 1886. It connected to the AW&B at Bay Ridge Junction, where the AW&B crossed College Creek, and connected Annapolis with the resort town of Bay Ridge, Maryland. In September of that year it was bought out by the B&O railroad.

Competition came in the form of the Annapolis and Baltimore Shortline which opened in 1887. It provided a faster connection from Annapolis to Baltimore as it took a more direct path along the north shore of the Severn River. By 1892 it connected to the AW&B at Bay Ridge Junction.

In 1902, the Washington, Baltimore and Annapolis Electric Railway (WB&A) began constructing a third rail line between Baltimore and Washington. This line crossed the AW&B just east of Odenton at a place called Naval Academy Junction. The WB&A was an electric interurban streetcar line, a new and exciting mode of transportation at the turn of the 20th century.

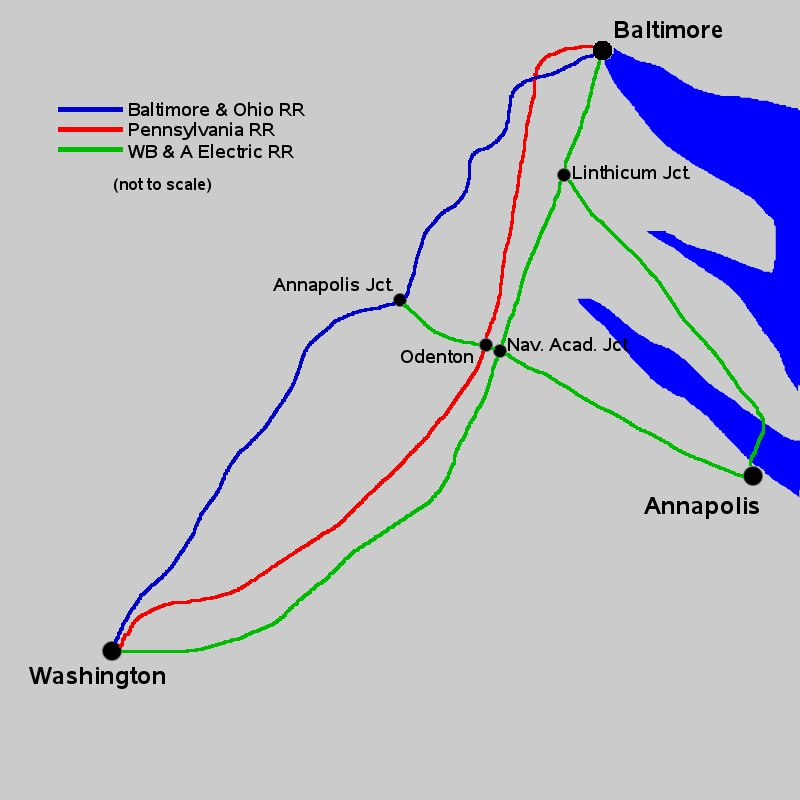
Map showing WB&A system, including former A&ER line.

=== Subsidiary ===
In 1903, the AW&B was purchased by the WB&A and in 1907, the WB&A began to transform the AW&B into an electric interurban and merge the two. The AW&B was closed and then reopened in 1908 with electric passenger rail between Naval Academy Junction and Annapolis and steam engines used to haul freight. Later, the line west of Naval Academy Junction was electrified as well and steam trains disappeared.

The AW&B had a small railyard just west of the West Street Station and by 1908 the tracks continued past the West Street Station to follow a loop through downtown Annapolis to a ferry slip on Spa Creek where a ferry connected to Claiborne, MD on the Eastern Shore and the Baltimore, Chesapeake and Atlantic Railway. By 1910 the ferry connection to Claiborne was gone.

== South Shore Line ==
In 1921, the WB&A also acquired the Baltimore & Annapolis Short Line. After the acquisition the AW&B trackage was termed the South Shore Division, and the Short Line was called the North Shore Division. In Annapolis, the South Shore Line connected with both the North Shore Line and the A&BR at Bay Ridge Junction.

=== World War I ===
There was little traffic over the west end of the line until 1917 when the U.S. entered World War I. At that time the railroad interests in the area persuaded the U.S. Army to acquire land and open a training facility in the area roughly bounded by the B&O Washington Branch on the west, the Pennsylvania Railroad-controlled Philadelphia, Baltimore and Washington Railroad on the east. It was situated around the WB&A stations at Harmans, Disney, and Portland. This would become Camp Meade. Several new tracks were extended onto post, including a line which ran north along Midway Branch almost to Mapes Road; two sidings at Disney and Admiral; and tracks of the P.P.&W.RR. The installation was supposed to be a temporary facility, used only for the duration of the war, but it became Fort Meade, a permanent establishment, in 1928 and is still in use today. The WB&A saw record traffic during this time as a result of freight and passenger service to the camp. In 1918, the railroad system carried 5,946,697 paying passengers.

=== End of the line ===
In 1931, during the Great Depression, the WB&A went into receivership. The rise of the automobile marked the end of the WB&A, along with most other electric interurbans. The system remained in operation for four more years until operation officially ceased on August 20, 1935. The WB&A was sold at public auction with scrap dealers buying most of the rolling stock. In 1935 the vast majority of the South Shore division was abandoned and sold for scrap.

Six miles of track between Annapolis Junction and Academy Junction were retained. The portion between the Fort Meade and Academy Junction was purchased by the Pennsylvania Railroad and the portion from Fort Meade to Annapolis Junction was taken over by the B&O. They served a concrete company, Fort Meade and a few smaller clients. In 1943, a cabinetmaking company, later National Plastics moved into the old WB&A shops at Academy Junction and used the rail line.

The Fort Meade sections remained busy through World War II and the Korean War, but traffic dropped when the base converted its heating plant to fuel oil. It dropped again when the 1st Squadron, 6th Cavalry Regiment which regularly required the movement of tanks and artillery by rail left Fort Meade. By 1978 traffic was down to 25 to 30 carloads of rail freight a month for the base, and a small amount on non-military rail traffic. Meanwhile, ownership of the line changed as the Pennsylvania became Penn Central and then Conrail. In 1972 the B&O stopped serving the base.

In 1981, Conrail proposed to abandon the 1.6 miles between Odenton and Fort Meade. At that time the line was only being used to move concrete ties from storage to Amtrak's Northeast Corridor. In December 1982 all rail operations to Fort Meade ceased and the base's single locomotive, an 80-ton diesel built by General Electric in 1952 and numbered 1684, left for Baltimore (pulling up the track behind it) and then the McAlester Army Ammunition Plant in Oklahoma.

The rail remained there until the Patuxent Freeway was built in 1989, at which time the line was broken on the west side of Fort Meade. Though not in use, some tracks were still extent at Fort Meade in 2015, but the bridge over Midway Branch was removed by then.

The tracks west of Academy Junction continued to be used to serve the National Plastics, later Nevamar, factory in Odenton, but saw an end to regular use after it closed in 2004.

The only remaining tracks in regular use are the junction tracks at Annapolis Junction, now part of an aggregates terminal.

== Stations ==
- Annapolis Junction - connection with the B&O
- Camp Meade Junction
- Portland
- Disney (Disney Rd)
- Admiral
- Fairall
- Odenton - connection with the Pennsylvania RR (B&P)
- Naval Academy Junction - connection with the WB&A (Academy Junction Shopping Center)
- Sappington (Sappington Station Rd)
- Gambrills
- Holladay
- Millersville
- Arundel
- Waterbury (Waterbury Rd)
- Gott
- Crownsville
- Belvoir (Belvoir Manor)
- Arth
- Iglehart (Sherwood Forest)
- Woytych (Woodlore?)
- Hockley
- Best Gate
- Camp Parole
- Homewood
- Cedar Park
- Bay Ridge Junction - connection with the Bay Ridge and Annapolis Railroad
- Annapolis at the West Street Station
- Annapolis at the U.S. Naval Academy

== Remnants ==
- The wye of track where the Annapolis & Elkridge joined the B&O Washington Branch (now owned by CSX) in Annapolis Junction is still intact. It now serves a cement plant. Just east of there, part of the railroad's bridge over Dorsey Run remains, though is unusable as much of it was removed during the construction of Route 32 in the late 1980s.
- ~1000 feet of MD-198 just west of the Patuxent Freeway interchange uses the right of way.
- Admiral Station at 39 Rock Avenue (now the Dan Daniel Distribution Center - Fort Meade Relay) and some of the warehouses that served the Fort Meade rail yard are still standing on the base south of Rock Avenue and, as of 2015, some track remained.
- A short section of the right-of-way in Odenton between Old Odenton Road and Town Center Boulevard is used for the Odenton Town Center Trail, which was built around 2009.
- A section of railroad track exists in the Academy Junction section of Odenton, Maryland. It branches off of Amtrak's Northeast Corridor just south of MD 175/Annapolis Road and travels east past the Odenton Library and across MD 170/Piney Orchard Parkway at grade before turning north to cross Annapolis Road, also at-grade. It then travels a short distance north to the site of the old Nevamar Company's manufacturing plant. This factory was built in 1943 by then-National Plastics Products Company on the site of the WB&A's Naval Academy Junction Yard using the WB&A Railroad's repair buildings and tracks. That plant shut down in 2004 and trains haven't regularly run on the spur since, although the track has been used to briefly store AMTRAK or freight cars and to access the BGE substation site. Some of the former car repair buildings remained there until the plant was cleared in 2012 to make room for the Academy Yard mixed use development.
- Several roads were built on the right-of-way including
  - Annapolis Road between Oakton Road and Gateway Boulevard.
  - Maple Road, Holladay Park Road and Sir Walter Road in Millersville
  - Most of Generals Highway (Route 178) between I-97 and US-50
  - Callahan Lane in Cape St. Clair
  - Defense Street in Annapolis.
  - Poplar Avenue and the adjacent Poplar Trail, a half mile hike-bike rail trail in Annapolis.
  - Lowe's Access Road in Annapolis
- The South Shore Trail, of which about 3 miles was built as of 2019, will eventually use about 11 miles of the right-of-way between Odenton and Parole. Currently there is a section between Crain Highway and Waterbury Road and the right-of-way, with cuts and mounds, remains in various states south of that. An original culvert across Saltworks Creek remains.
