= Bay Ridge and Annapolis Railroad =

Short line railroad in central Maryland, US

- 1915 map showing the Bay Ridge and Annapolis Railroad

Overview
- Headquarters: Annapolis, Maryland
- Locale: Annapolis, Maryland, to Bay Ridge, Maryland
- Dates of operation: 1886–1904

Technical
- Track gauge: 4 ft 8 1/2 in (1,435 mm) standard gauge

The Bay Ridge and Annapolis Railroad was a 4.5-mile long short line railroad in central Maryland. It ran 4.5 miles from a junction with the Annapolis, Washington and Baltimore Railroad to the resort town of Bay Ridge, Maryland. It mainly provided transportation between Annapolis and the resort, but also connected with a carferry and steamer service to the Eastern Shore. A small connection was eventually made to the Baltimore and Annapolis Short Line. Shortly after opening it fell under the control of the Baltimore and Ohio Railroad. It was never able to make money so it was shut down in 1904 and the tracks were removed in 1918. Almost no sign of it remains today.

== History ==
=== Origins ===
The Bay Ridge and Annapolis Railroad was incorporated by the Bay Ridge Company in March 1886. The Bay Ridge Company rebuilt the beach resort on the Chesapeake Bay in 1885. The hotel was doubled in size, the boardwalk expanded, and beach cottages were constructed. The company even opened a zoological exhibit with lions, tigers and bears.

The railroad began operation on July 10, 1886 and for the next 17 years, thousands of people used it to visit the "Queen Resort of the Chesapeake." The start up costs, however, were enormous, and in September 1886, the Bay Ridge Company issued $300,000 worth of bonds. Robert Garrett, President of the Baltimore and Ohio Railroad, bought $150,000 worth of the bonds giving the B&O a controlling interest in the Bay Ridge Company and the Annapolis and Bay Ridge Railroad.

At a point prior to 1890, a small connection was made from Chesapeake Junction to the Baltimore and Annapolis Short Line near West Annapolis.

=== Carferry connection ===
For 13 months in 1890-91 the BR&A connected to a carferry and steamer service run by the Baltimore and Eastern Shore Railroad. That service ended in October 1891 and was replaced by a steamer-only operation out of Baltimore.

=== End of the line ===
The railroad was never profitable and in 1904 it ceased operations. In 1918, with steel at a premium due to World War I, the tracks were removed.

== Stations on the line ==
- Bay Ridge Junction
- Bay Ridge

== Surviving landmarks ==
- Some right-of-way visible at Bay Ridge Junction and at points in Bay Ridge
- There are no houses on the east side of Amos Garrett Boulevard in Annapolis. The former right-of-way was incorporated into the back yards of the houses on the west side of Archwood Avenue when the railroad was closed.
- The right-of-way between Spa View Drive and Spa Creek is now Amos Garrett Waterfront Park.
- Cable lines following theright-of-way cross Spa Creek between Amos Garrett Park and Truxton Park.
- The main access road in Truxton Park follows the right-of-way
- In the mid 1960's and through the early 21st century, there still existed, running as a continuation at the southern end of Old Bay Ridge Rd in Annapolis Roads to the community of Anchorage, a raised path with a steep drop down on both sides that was where the railroad ran. Through the 1970's one could still find rotted railroad ties and spikes along the path. Currently (2023) the raised path has either eroded down or been demolished, so neither the continuous raised trackbed/path nor ANY remnants of the railroad, remains.
