= LocalLink 70 (BaltimoreLink) =

Bus route operated by the Maryland Transit Administration

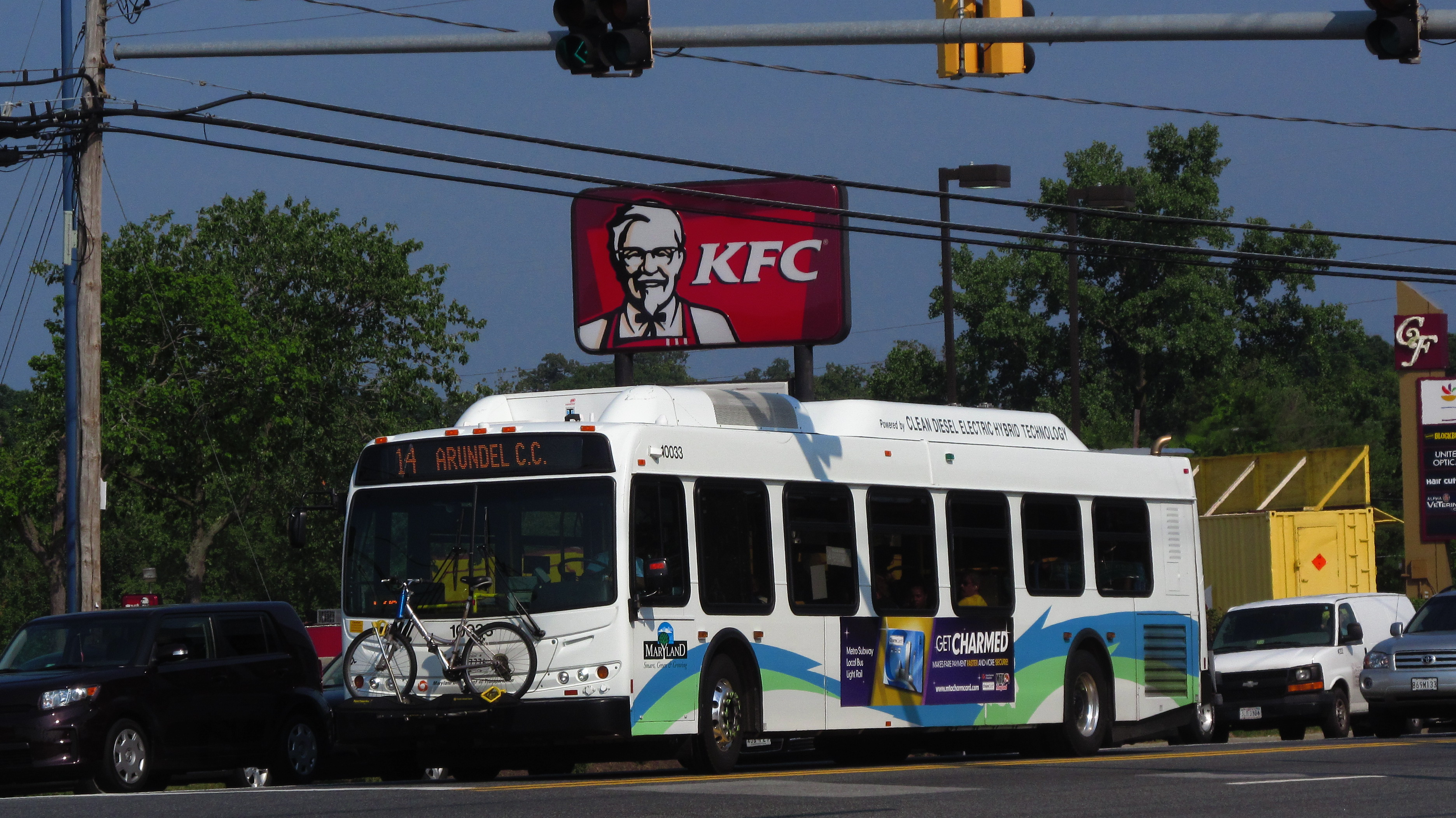

Overview
- System: Maryland Transit Administration
- Garage: Bush
- Status: active
- Began service: 1973
- Predecessors: Annapolis and Baltimore Short Line Railroad (1887–1935); Baltimore and Annapolis Railroad (1935–1950); Supplemental buses (1950–1973); Route 14 (1973-2017)

Route
- Locale: Baltimore City; Anne Arundel County; Annapolis
- Communities served: Brooklyn Park; Glen Burnie; Pasadena; Severna Park; Arnold
- Landmarks served: Baltimore Washington Medical Center; Marley Station; Anne Arundel Community College; U.S. Naval Academy; Maryland State Capitol
- Other routes: 16, 17, 51, 77

Service
- Level: Daily
- Frequency: Every 60 minutes
- Weekend frequency: Every 70-90 minutes
- Operates: 5:00 am to 1:25 am

LocalLink 70 is a bus route operated by the Maryland Transit Administration between Baltimore and Annapolis, Maryland. At most times, the line operates from the Patapsco light rail station in southern Baltimore County with short turns at Jumper's Hole in Pasadena. The bus route, one of the longest local routes operated by MTA, is the successor to the Baltimore and Annapolis Railroad interurban, and mainly operates along the parallel Ritchie Highway, serving Brooklyn Park, Glen Burnie, Pasadena, and Severna Park. When the Light Rail is not running, the 70 runs all the way to downtown Baltimore, mostly along Hanover Street.

While MTA used the zone system for its fares that was abolished in 1996, Route 14 was the only local bus that operated into Zone 5, the farthest out zone from Baltimore City, where the highest fares were paid.

== History ==
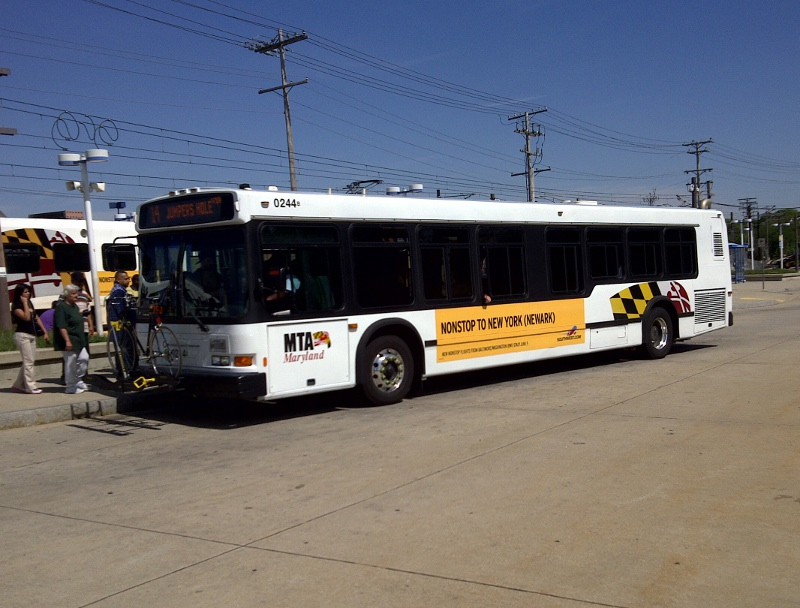
MTA Maryland Neoplan operating the old 14 at the Cromwell Light Rail Station, with a destination of Jumper's Hole.

The Annapolis and Baltimore Short Line Railroad began operating steam trains between Baltimore and Annapolis in 1887, and electrified their line in 1908. The Baltimore and Annapolis Railroad, formed in a 1935 reorganization, soon began operating buses to supplement its main line; buses replaced that main line on February 5, 1950. The MTA took over the bus route in 1973, and numbered it Route 14.

The no. 14 designation was not used for any Baltimore-Annapolis service until 1973, and prior to this date, Baltimore-Annapolis transportation was unnumbered. No. 14 previously referred to a streetcar service that operated between Ellicott City and downtown Baltimore until 1954. The portion of this service as far west as Catonsville is now served by Route 23; Ellicott City service is offered on a limited basis by Route 150.

When the Central Light Rail Line opened in 1992 along part of the old interurban line, Route 14 was truncated to the Patapsco stop during Light Rail operating hours, with selected trips deviating to Bay Meadow Industrial Park. A deviation to serve the Cromwell light rail stop was added in 1993 when this station opened.

In 1996, a new branch via Baltimore Annapolis Boulevard was added to replace a portion of Route 17 along this road that was eliminated.

In 2005, as part of the Greater Baltimore Bus Initiative, it was proposed that Route 14 be split, with route 14 operating only between Patapsco and Jumper's Hole, and the new Route 41 serving Annapolis less frequently. Due to public outcry, this plan was not implemented.

In 2008, Route 14 was split into two branches: One operates to Annapolis via the original route. The other operates to Jumper's Hole via a variation of this route to serve the Quarterfield Shopping Center, which is the location of a Wal-Mart Supercenter. This branch operates every day except Sundays.

In 2017, Route 14 became LocalLink 75 after the BaltimoreLink overhaul.
