= LocalLink 75 (BaltimoreLink) =

Bus route operated by the Maryland Transit Administration

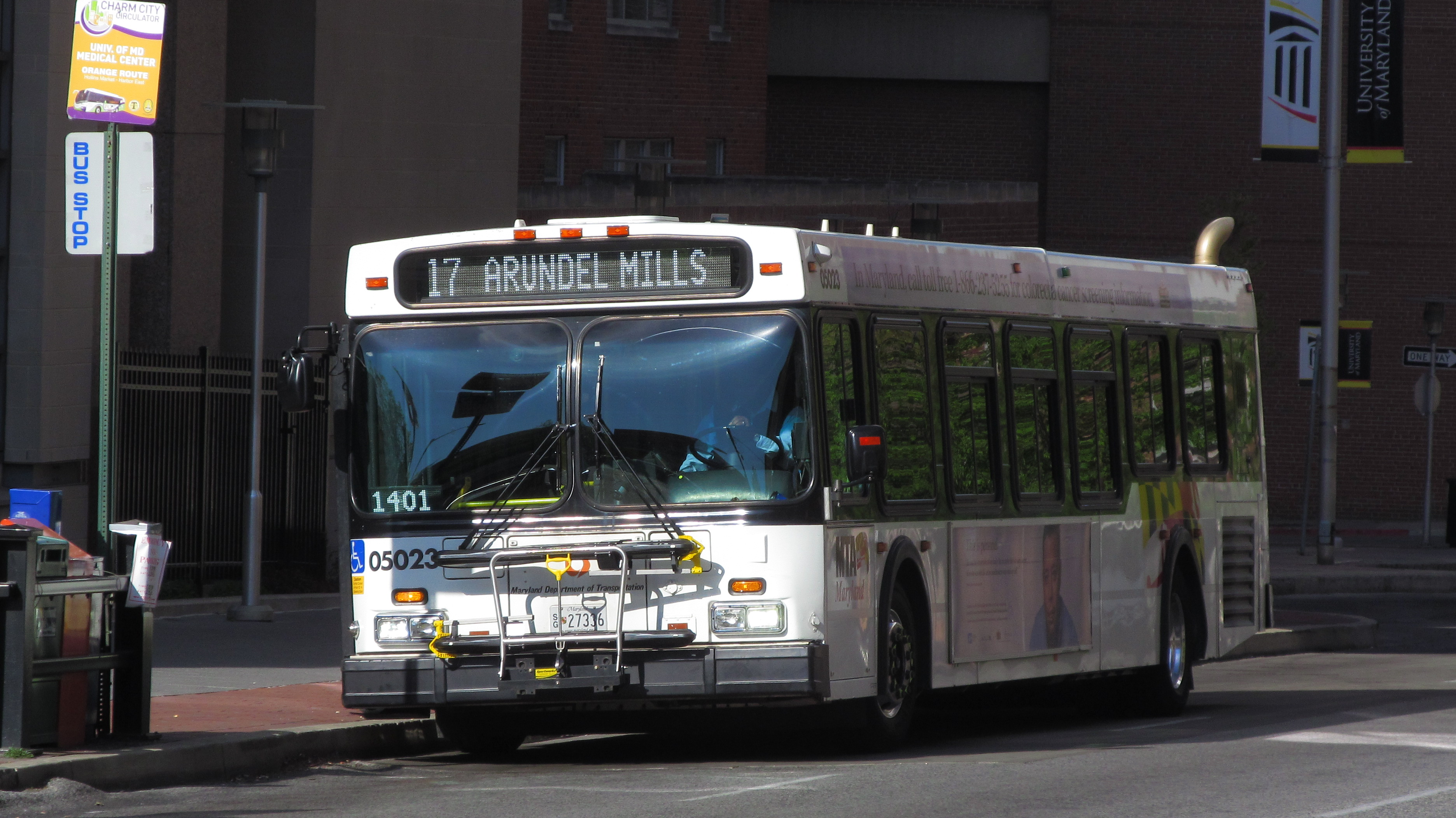

Overview
- System: Maryland Transit Administration
- Garage: Bush
- Status: active
- Began service: 1973
- Predecessors: Route 17; Bus Route 230

Route
- Locale: Baltimore City; Anne Arundel County
- Communities served: Baltimore Highlands; Pumphrey; Linthicum; Hanover
- Landmarks served: BWI Airport; Arundel Mills
- Other routes: 14, 16, 51, 77, 99, WMATA Bus Route B30; Howard Transit Silver route Annapolis Transit

Service
- Level: Daily
- Frequency: Every 60-80 minutes Every 30-35 minutes (peak)
- Weekend frequency: Every 60 minutes
- Operates: 24 hours a day

LocalLink 75 is a bus route operated by the Maryland Transit Administration in Baltimore and its suburbs. The line currently runs from the Patapsco Light Rail Stop to Arundel Mills in Anne Arundel County, via BWI Airport. The line operates to University of Maryland during hours when the light rail is not operating.

== History ==
Route 75 is one of the most modified bus routes in MTA history from its original route. Only three of the 27 miles of its initial route in 1973 are still in place today. Much of its original route is not served by any public transportation, particularly portions along Maryland Route 177.

Its current route is actually the successor to several other bus routes no longer in operation. The route has seen a very fragile existence, facing a lot of budget cuts that have resulted in its route and schedule being reduced, and a near threat of elimination.

The current Route 17 started operating in 1973 between downtown Baltimore and Gibson Island. At that time, it served the Annapolis Road/Baltimore-Annapolis Boulevard and Mountain Road corridors, mostly of Anne Arundel County. It also passed through the towns of Linthicum, Glen Burnie, and Pasadena.

The no. 17 designation was previously used for a streetcar that ran along the St. Paul Street corridor of Charles Village from 1893 to 1938. In 1939, this was converted to a bus operation and extended south to Westport along Annapolis Road. This route was replaced with other services in 1947. Another unrelated route briefly ran along East East Fayette Street 1949–50, the last Baltimore bus route to carry this designation until the introduction of the current Route 17.

The route was shortened during the 1980s from Gibson Island to Lake Shore Plaza. Gibson Island became a private island, and the causeway leading there closed to the public, and ridership demand in this area was very low. Also, trips at certain times of day terminated at Pinewood Village in the Harundale area.

Route 17 did not serve BWI Airport until 1993. From 1973 to 1989, Route 16, which operated from downtown Baltimore to Odenton, provided service to BWI. This was replaced with Route 230 in 1989. Route 230 provided a limited number of express trips to the airport until the light rail was extended into Anne Arundel County in 1993, and local bus routes replaced the service.

== Opening of Central Light Rail ==
When the Central Light Rail line was opened in South Baltimore and Anne Arundel County, Route 17 underwent a series of changes in various phases.

In September 1992, the route was converted into a feeder bus into the light rail, and was truncated to the Patapsco Light Rail Stop. The portion going to downtown Baltimore was eliminated, though it was covered locally by Route 28. In addition, Sunday service was completely abolished.

In January 1993, the route faced budget cuts. On weekdays, midday service between 9 a.m. and 2 p.m., which had very low ridership was eliminated. Saturday service was shortened to Pinewood Village.

In September 1993, when the final stretch of the light rail opened, midday service was restored, as the route underwent even more changes, replacing the then-eliminated Route 230. It was modified to serve BWI Airport and the BWI business area and hotel district. The portion along Hammonds Ferry Road in Linthicum was provided on a new Route 12. Rush hour service operated to Lake Shore Plaza, and midday service only as far as the Cromwell light rail stop.

== Combining with Route 12 and cuts ==
In 1996, Route 17 faced its biggest cuts ever. All service between BWI Airport and Lake Shore Plaza was eliminated, as MTA would no longer serve some of these communities. Service to Pinewood Village was replaced with a new limited branch of Route 14, and service on Mountain Road was no longer provided. Other parts of Baltimore-Annapolis Boulevard are within a close walk of various light rail stops. Route 17 line was also combined with Route 12 line and extended to Parkway Center, thereby providing all this service on a single route.

== Extension to Arundel Mills ==
In 2001, with the opening of Arundel Mills mall in Hanover, Maryland, Route 17 was extended to this area. All trips to Parkway Center were routed via Arundel Mills, and all trips terminating at BWI Airport were extended there. In addition, Sunday service was added to serve the mall.

== Threat of total elimination ==
In 2005, as part of the Greater Baltimore Bus Initiative, MTA proposed to eliminate Route 17, except for a few trips between downtown Baltimore and BWI Airport when the light rail was not operating. Under this plan, riders between the airport and Arundel Mills were instructed to use Howard County Transit's Red Express Route, which operates along nearly the same route in this area, and all other riders in Anne Arundel County would lose service. MTA stated that the underperforming route required a heavy taxpayer subsidy.

The plan resulted in a public outcry from riders, businesses along the route, and community activists. One of the major complaints was that many non-English-speaking riders along the route who worked within the BWI hotel district would lose service and not even know it.

In 2006, MTA revised its plan for Route 17. Under the new routing plan, the line would continue to operate full-time, but from the Patapsco Light Rail Stop to Arundel Mills only, with service provided every 30 minutes during rush hour, and every 90 minutes at other times. Some of the deviations along the route where duplicate service is provided (such as to BWI Amtrak) would be eliminated or modified. Only riders west of Arundel Mills to Parkway Center would lose service.

In 2007, GBBI was canceled, and plans to eliminate or reduce service on this line were not made.

In 2009, branches to Airport 100 Business Park and SECU were eliminated.

In 2017, Route 17 became LocalLink Route 75 under BaltimoreLink.
