= Patapsco station =

Baltimore Light Rail station in Halethorpe, Maryland, US

Patapsco
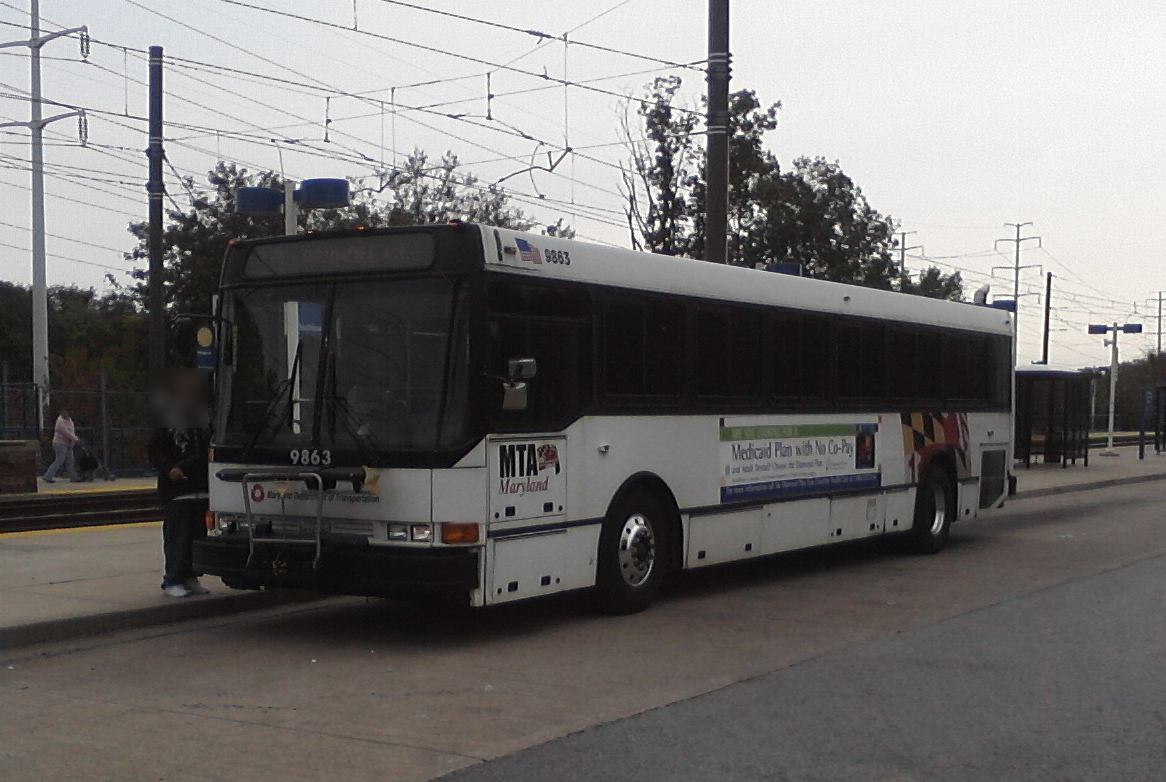
- An MTA Maryland bus at Patapsco station in 2010

General information
- Location: 751 West Patapsco Avenue; Lansdowne, Maryland
- Coordinates: 39°14′31.2″N 76°37′48″W
- Owner: Maryland Transit Administration
- Platforms: 2 side platforms
- Tracks: 2
- Connections: 14; 16; 17; 51; 75; 77

Construction
- Parking: 216 free spaces
- Accessible: Yes

History
- Opened: 1993

Passengers
- 2017: 1,192 daily

Services
Preceding station	Maryland Transit Administration	Following station
Baltimore Highlands toward BWI Airport or Glen Burnie	Light RailLink	Cherry Hill toward Hunt Valley
Location

Patapsco station is a Baltimore Light Rail station in Halethorpe, Maryland. The stop is located along Patapsco Avenue from which its name is derived. The station serves as a hub for several MTA bus routes. Patapsco was the final stop along the line for a period from September 1992 until April 1993, when the line was extended to Linthicum.

The station has 216 spaces for commuters, some of that allow for overnight parking. Patapasco station was the original northern terminus of the Baltimore and Annapolis Railroad, which connected to the Curtis Bay Branch of the Baltimore and Ohio Railroad.

Bus routes 14, 75, 51, 77 and the Patapsco branch of CityLink Yellow lay over at the station. Route 16 also passes through the station in both directions along its route.

== Station layout ==
G
G	Side platform, doors will open on the right
G	Southbound	← Light Rail toward BWI Airport or Glen Burnie (Baltimore Highlands)
G	Northbound	Light Rail toward Fairgrounds or Hunt Valley (Cherry Hill) →
G	Side platform, doors will open on the right
G	Street level	Exit/entrance
