= Washington, Baltimore and Annapolis Electric Railway =

American railroad (1899–1935)

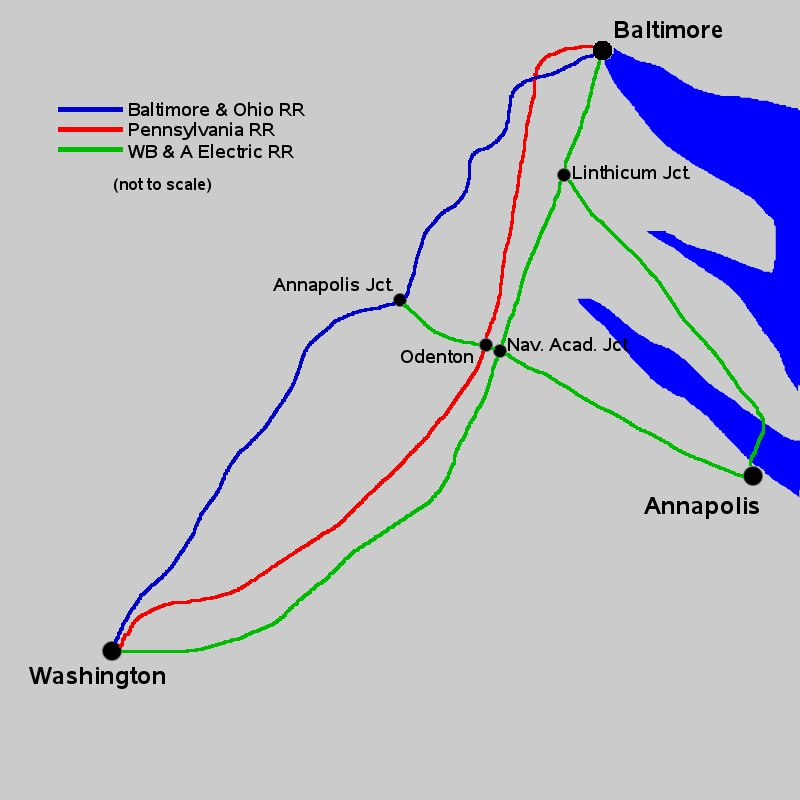
- WB&A System map

Overview
- Headquarters: Annapolis, Maryland
- Reporting mark: WB&A
- Locale: Maryland and Washington, D.C.
- Dates of operation: 1908–1935
- Successor: Franchise acquired by Baltimore-Washington Rapid Rail and the Northeast Maglev

Technical
- Track gauge: 4 ft 8 1/2 in (1,435 mm) standard gauge
- Electrification: 6,600 V AC (1908–1910); Overhead line, 1,200 V DC (after 1910)

The Washington, Baltimore and Annapolis Electric Railway (WB&A) was an American railroad that operated from 1899 until 1935 in central Maryland and Washington, D.C.

It was built by a group of Cleveland, Ohio, electric railway entrepreneurs to serve as a high-speed showpiece line using the most advanced technology of the time. The WB&A absorbed two older railroads, the Annapolis and Elk Ridge Railroad and the Baltimore & Annapolis Short Line, and added its own electric streetcar line between Baltimore and Washington. It served Washington, Baltimore, and Annapolis, Maryland, for 27 years. In 1935, the railroad was sold at auction, undermined by the Great Depression and the rise of the automobile.

Successor companies continued to offer passenger service on the line between Annapolis and Baltimore until the late 1950s, when the trains were replaced by a bus service that operated until 1968.

Today, parts of the right-of-way are used for Baltimore Light RailLink, a light rail service from Cromwell Station / north Glen Burnie to downtown Baltimore and further north through city to Hunt Valley in Baltimore County. Other parts are now rail trails or roads through Anne Arundel County.

== History ==
=== Origins ===
The WB&A was originally incorporated in 1899 as "The Potomac and Severn Electric Railway". On April 10, 1900, it changed its name to the "Washington and Annapolis Electric Railway" and finally, on April 8, 1902, to the "Washington, Baltimore and Annapolis Electric Railway".

In 1903, the WB&A purchased the Annapolis, Washington & Baltimore Railroad (AW&B) — formerly the Annapolis & Elkridge Railroad — which was closed in 1907, electrified, and reopened in 1908. It ran from the B&O main line at Annapolis Junction, crossed the WB&A main line just east of Odenton, and headed east via Millersville and Crownsville to Annapolis.

At the same time, it laid an almost straight double-track route parallel to the Baltimore and Ohio and Pennsylvania railroads, but slightly to the east in less populated territory. This was the WB&A mainline. On February 7, 1908, service began between Annapolis and Washington; the first service into Baltimore was on March 19, 1908. After 1910, the line reached the heart of downtown DC on 15th Street near the Treasury. In 1911, the WB&A electrified service on the mainline.

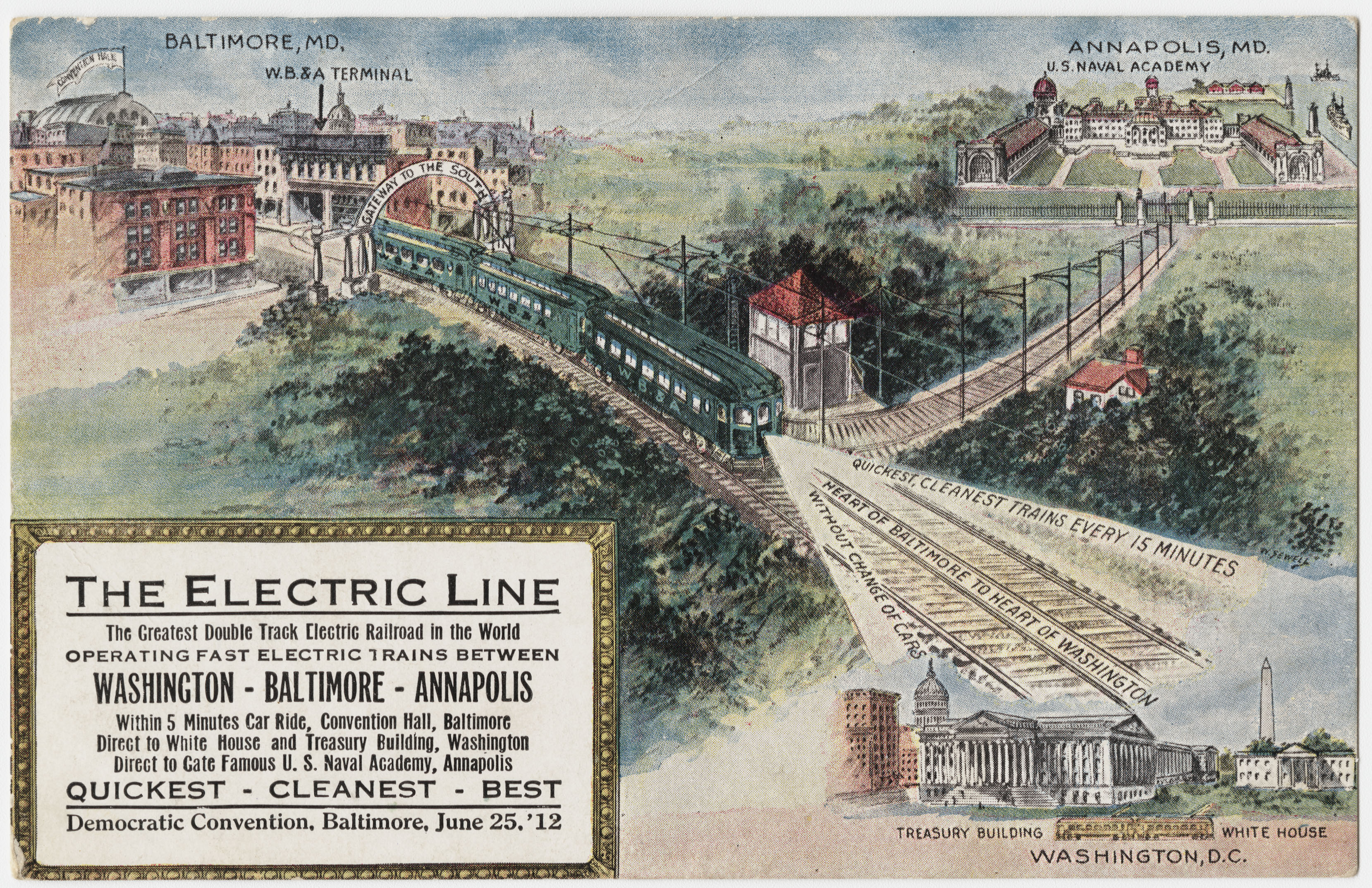
A postcard advertising WB&A's interurban service from the Democratic National Convention of 1912, held at the Fifth Regiment Armory on North Howard Street to nominate Woodrow Wilson for U.S. president.

The line built by the WB&A, later called the Main Line, ran from Baltimore to Washington through Bowie, Glenn Dale Hospital, and Glenarden to Fairmont Heights, where it met with the Chesapeake Beach Railway just outside Washington at Chesapeake Junction. From there, it continued to Deanwood on the Washington Railway and Electric Company's Seat Pleasant Line, running parallel to the Chesapeake Beach Railway tracks and across the Benning Road Bridge into downtown Washington.

Once onto their own right-of-way, the WB&A's expresses regularly hit 60 mph, but street running in the terminal cities slowed their overall time. A typical B&O express made the trip in 50 minutes, but the best the WB&A could do was an hour and 20 minutes. Offsetting these handicaps were its cleanliness, lower fares, half-hourly express service, and better-located downtown terminals.

=== Business along the route ===
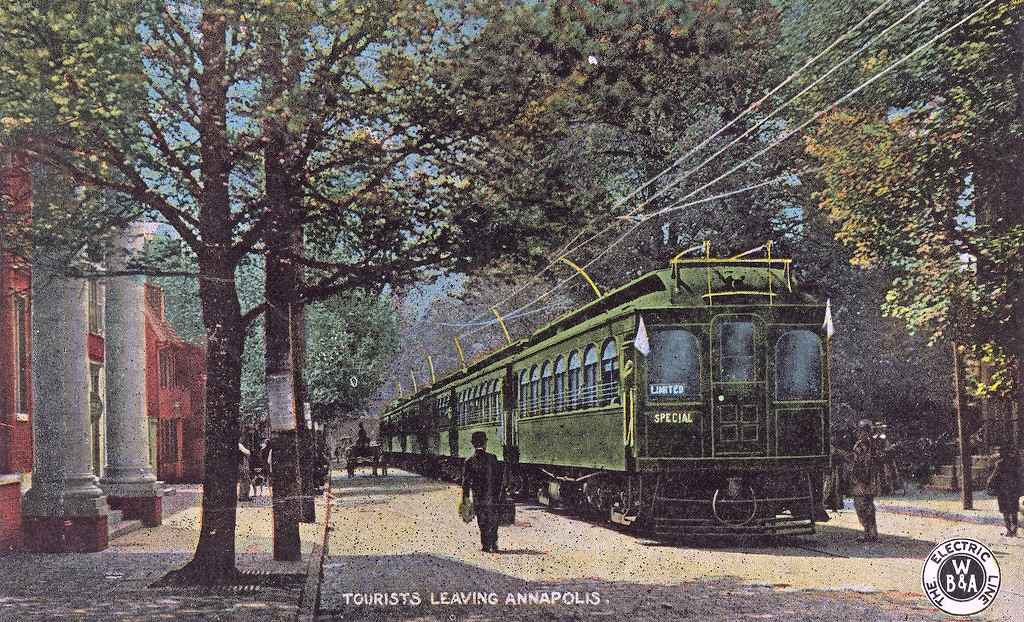
6-car excursion extra departing Annapolis for Washington in 1910

Always looking for new sources of business, the railroad, in 1914, convinced the Southern Maryland Agricultural Fair Association to establish Bowie Race Track along the Main Line. The railroad built a short spur off the line to a railyard there.

In September 1917, as the U.S. entered World War I, George Bishop, the WB&A's well-connected president, persuaded the U.S. Army to acquire land owned by the railroad and open a training facility. Camp Meade was established in the area roughly bounded by the B&O Washington Branch on the west, the Pennsylvania Railroad on the east, and the South Shore Line of the WB&A to the south. The installation was supposed to be a temporary facility, used only for the duration of the war, but it remains in use today as Fort Meade, site of the headquarters of the National Security Agency and United States Cyber Command. The WB&A saw record traffic during this time as a result of freight and passenger service to the camp. In 1918, the railroad was running as many as 84 special trains a day.

=== Expansion ===
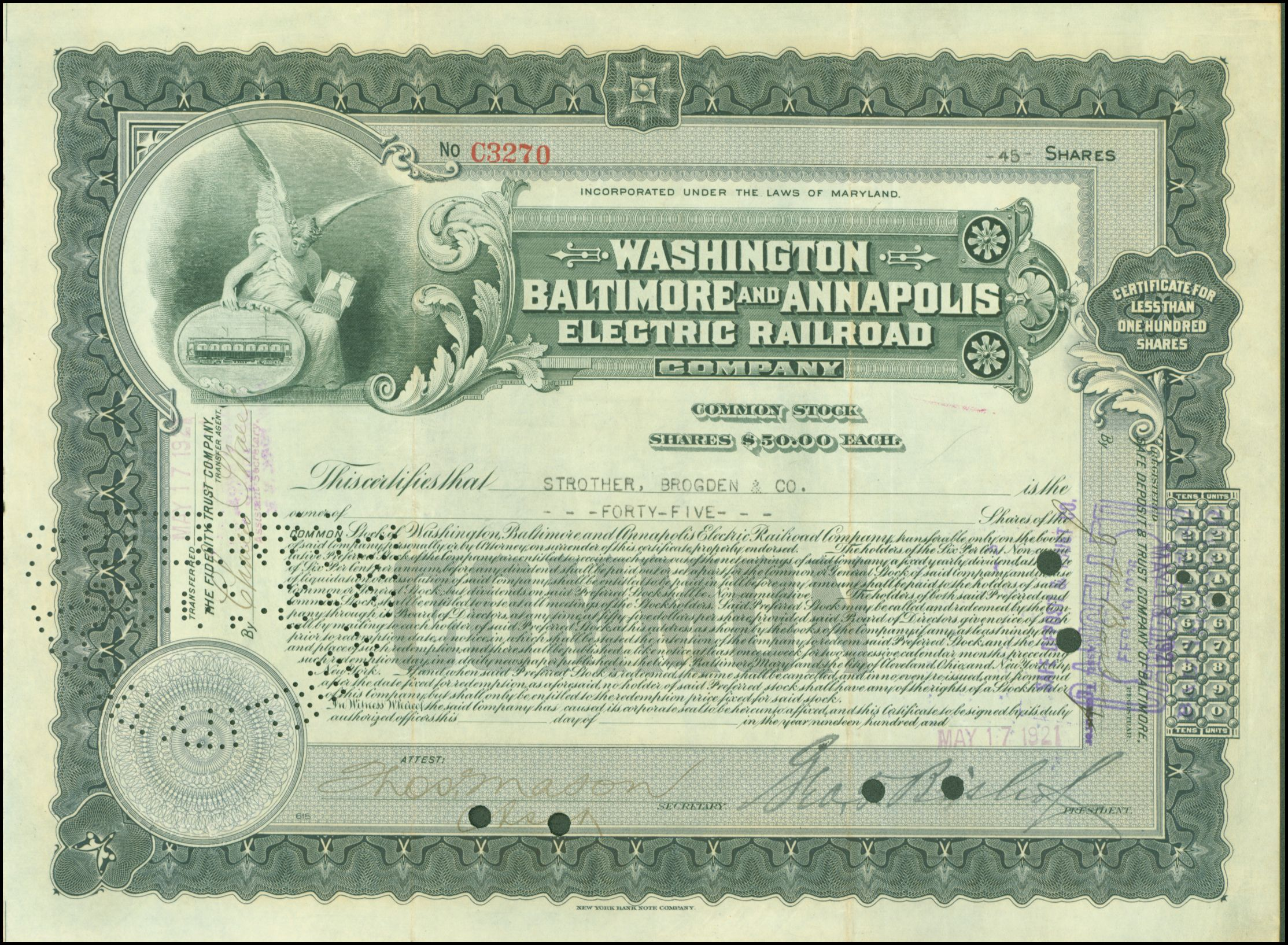
Share of the Washington, Baltimore and Annapolis Electric Railroad Company, issued 17. May 1921

With the business seemingly successful, the WB&A went into an expansion and investment phase. In 1921 it opened a new Washington, DC terminal on New York Avenue and purchased the Baltimore & Annapolis Short Line.

The B&A became known as the "North Shore Line" and the old A&ER was called the "South Shore Line". To consolidate operations, the B&A gave up its terminus at the Camden Street Station of the Baltimore and Ohio Railroad and started using the WB&A terminal on Liberty Street (between Lexington and Fayette) in Baltimore. Until 1921, the WB&A and B&A ran on separate, parallel tracks between Linthicum and Baltimore. But on March 16, 1921, a crossover opened between the lines at Linthicum. Operations ceased on the B&O track, and a new terminal was built at the southwest corner of South Howard and West Lombard Streets across from what is now 1st Mariner Arena.

The new WB&A then consisted of 81 miles of track and was the only practical way to get from Washington, D.C. to Annapolis.

=== Equipment ===
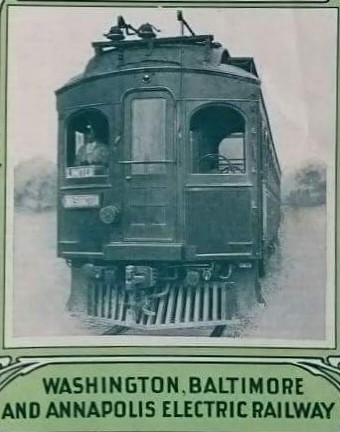
WB&A arch window coach shown in 1908 timetable

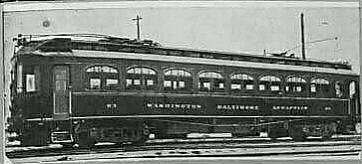
WB&A arch window coach in 1908

Initially, passengers between Baltimore-Washington and Annapolis rode the "classic" 1900-1910 arch-window all-wood-body truss-rod-frame interurban coach. In the 1920s, when passenger business was good, the line purchased and operated steel two-car articulated (attached body with a common center truck/boogie) coaches on the Baltimore-Annapolis route. This equipment later went to the Milwaukee Electric Line in Wisconsin.

=== Decline ===
Around the time of the purchase of the ASL, the Defense Highway was built, providing an alternative route into Annapolis. As a result, gross receipts for the railroad began to decline. The railroad only survived because of a law exempting it from taxes. In January 1931, during the Great Depression, the extension of the law failed to pass by one vote and the line went into receivership. The line remained in operation for four more years and the Evans Products Company of Detroit negotiated to buy the railroad in June 1935, but those negotiations failed and the railroad officially ceased operations on August 20, 1935.

The railroad was sold at auction in 1935 and the Main Line and South Shore Divisions was bought by WB&A Realty. They sold the rolling stock to scrap dealers. Over time, the rails were hauled away, though by the beginning of World War II some remained and at least one post-War home in the area used old rails in lieu of I-beams. The right of way within Washington, D.C., remained under the ownership of WRECo and then the old Capital Transit Company. In 1936, the Pennsylvania RR took over the spur to Bowie Race track and the short section of the WB&A from the Bowie Race Track junction south to the bridge over Horsepen Run. Most of the rest of the main line from the Patapsco River near Pumphrey Station to Washington, DC was sold to the Maryland State Roads Commission in 1941. By March 1946, the entire railroad had been liquidated, including the right-of-way; the Annapolis substation; the train terminals in Baltimore and Washington; the Naval Academy Junction shops and properties in South Baltimore.

In 1948, Capitol Transit replaced the streetcars on the route with buses. At some point between 1951 and 1956, the tracks in D.C. were removed. The last remnant of the line, the trolley turnaround just inside of DC in Seat Pleasant, made the transitions to D.C. Transit and then WMATA, but a few months after the Capitol Heights Station opened in 1980, buses were routed away from it. It sat vacant until it was turned into the Eastbrooke Apartments in 2015. During the demolition the loop tracks were uncovered and then taken to the National Capitol Trolley Museum.

In 1950, when the B&A rail passenger service ended, the old WB&A terminal at Howard and Lombard Streets in Baltimore, which had been sold in 1935 to the owner of the "WB&A restaurant" in the terminal, became the bus terminal for the B&A passenger bus system. by then the tracks had been torn out and replaced with a parking garage. It was knocked down in 1964 for a Holiday Inn Motel.

While the vast majority of the South Shore division was abandoned and sold for scrap in the 1930s, the portion between Annapolis Junction and Odenton was purchased and operated by the B&O to serve Fort Meade until sometime between 1979 and 1981. It too was removed to allow for the construction of the Patuxent Freeway. Only the junction tracks at Annapolis Junction, which are used by an aggregates terminal, and part of an abandoned spur from the Amtrak mainline to the old Nevamar plant in Odenton remain.

The right-of-way of the North Shore Line and some equipment were bought by the Bondholders Protective Society, which then formed the Baltimore and Annapolis Railroad Company, which continued to operate rail passenger service between Baltimore and Annapolis until 1950; passenger buses into the early 1970s to Brooklyn in South Baltimore, connecting with the #6 transit line for streetcars and buses of the old Baltimore Transit Company and they then sold it in the 1980s. Freight continued on the line with diesel until it was adapted for light rail in 1992, and then freight ran on the light rail line at night for several years after that.

=== Accidents ===
On June 5, 1908, two of WB&A's single-car trains collided at Camp Parole, Maryland. Nine people died as a result of the crash, including Railroad Policeman J.G. Schriner. The trains were ferrying riders to and from the United States Naval Academy for graduation ceremonies at the time of the accident.

On May 5, 1921, a work extra, headed by freight motor #7, collided head-on with the overdue passenger train #339 at Ferndale, Maryland. The ICC investigated and determined that the work extra was operating ahead of the passenger train without proper authority, and that the accident could have been avoided through the proper deployment and checking of timetables by the work extra crew. One employee was killed and ten passengers were injured in the wreck.

== Stations on the Main Line ==
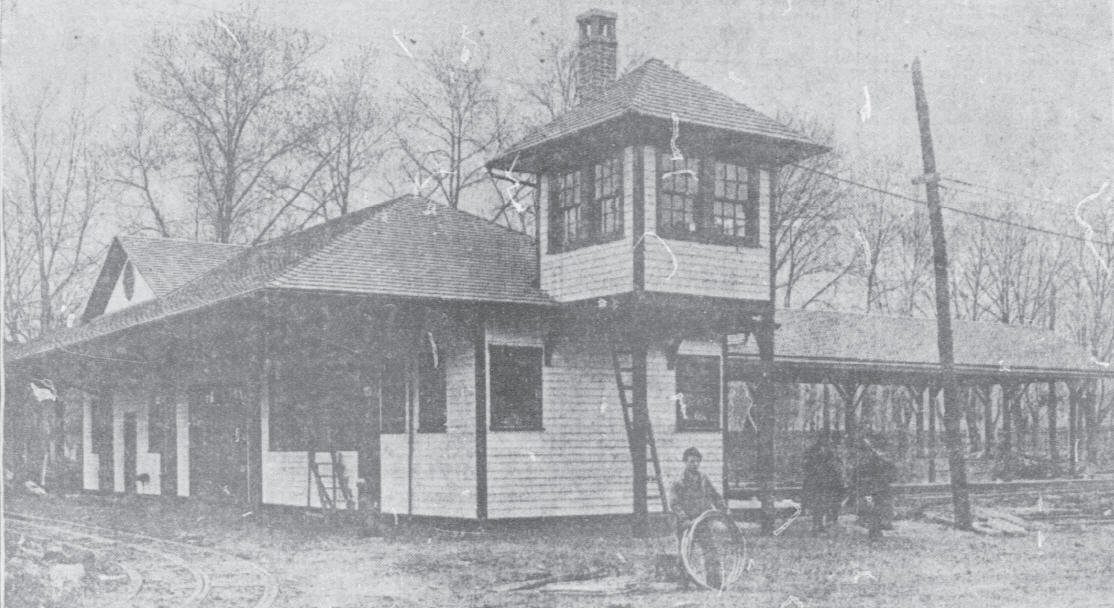
The WB&A Terminal at 15th and H St NE, Washington, D.C., shortly after its opening in March, 1908

- Baltimore
- Westport
- English Consul (Magnolia Avenue)
- Rosemont
- Baltimore Highlands (between Georgia and Illinois Avenues, across from the Baltimore and Annapolis Short Line Railroad station)
- Pumphrey
- North Linthicum
- Linthicum: Junction with North Shore Line
- Downs
- Wellham
- Kelly
- McPherson (WB&A Rd)
- Elmhurst
- Delmont
- Clark
- Severn Run
- Naval Academy: Junction with South Shore Line
- Waugh Chapel (Waugh Chapel Rd)
- Francis
- Bragers (Bragers Rd)
- Conway (Conway Rd)
- Meyers (Meyers Station Rd)
- Bowie
- Lloyd
- High Bridge
- Hillmeade
- Bell
- Randle
- Lincoln
- Vista
- Cherry Grove
- McCarthy (Named for the nearby farm owned by the McCarthy family. The train crossed their farm road).
- Ardmore
- Glenarden
- Dodge Park
- East Columbia Park
- Huntsville
- Gregory
- District Line where the WB&A entered Washington, D.C., and the trains transferred to tracks interior to the city line.
- White House Station at 15th St and H St, NE
- 1st and H St, NE
- Treasury Building

Stations on the South Shore Line (Annapolis and Elk Ridge Railroad)

Stations on the North Shore Line (Baltimore and Annapolis Railroad)

== Surviving landmarks ==
- The WB&A Terminal in Baltimore, now a former westside downtown Baltimore bank branch for the old Equitable Trust Company at North Liberty Street and Marion Street (alley)
- The Scott Street electric generating power substation on the NE corner of Scott and West Ostend Streets in southwest downtown
- The Westport tunnel's southern portal is visible just north of the Baltimore-Washington Parkway's MD-648/Annapolis Road southbound exit; the northern portal was demolished in 2021 as part of the Triple Bridges Project.
- The Baltimore Light Rail built in early 1990s uses the right-of-way twice: once from Baltimore Highlands through North Linthicum to a point north of Maple Road, and again from south of Linthicum to BWI Airport. The section of the Light Rail going to Glen Burnie (Cromwell Station) uses the Baltimore & Annapolis Railroad's parallel right-of-way.
- Linthicum railroad station
- WB&A Boulevard in Severn was built on the right-of-way.
- A section of railroad track exists in the Academy Junction section of Odenton, Maryland. It branches off of Amtrak's Northeast Corridor just south of MD 175/Annapolis Road and travels east past the Odenton Library and across MD 170/Piney Orchard Parkway at grade before turning north to cross Annapolis Road, also at-grade. It then travels a short distance north to the site of the old Nevamar Company's manufacturing plant. That plant shut down in 2004 and trains haven't run on the spur since.
- At the northeast corner of the location where the track listed above crosses MD 170 (Telegraph Road) is a brick building that once housed the WB&A operations headquarters. The Baltimore-Washington main line and Fort Meade-Annapolis (South Shore) branch crossed at this location, known as "Naval Academy Junction." The interlocking tower that controlled this crossing comprised the second floor. Commercial office tenants occupy the building today.
- Parts of the Power line Path remains in use to this day. The single circuit 115KV path from WB&A Road (just south of BWI Airport) to Telegraph Road and Annapolis Road remains with some modifications. Another path was replaced by a double circuit 115KV monopole from Pumphrey to Linthicum. Both are now lines used by BGE.
- The "Naval Academy Junction" shops sat about one mile (1.6 km) north of "Naval Academy Junction," on the east side of MD 170. The brick shop buildings were subsumed into a larger building complex that housed a number of manufacturing companies, including Nevamar Plastics, but those shops were torn down in 2013. The Academy Yard housing area now encompasses the area. The electrical power plant for this section of the WB&A overhead still stands and is visible from MD 170. The water tower associated with the Nevamar plant still stands there also.
- Two portions of the WB&A Trail, one from Odenton Town Center to the Two Rivers development and another 5.8-mile (9.3 km) section from the Patuxent River to Glenn Dale, run on the old right-of-way of the Main Line. These two portions of the trail are not connected due, in part, to a property dispute that diverted the trail west in Anne Arundel County where a bridge will be built later.
- A short sections of roadbed on either side of and a trestle over Horsepen Branch remain from the Bowie Race Track Spur as does the rail yard and some track. (A rail trail signed "WB&A Spur Trail" branches off of the WB&A Trail on the north side of the WB&A right-or way on a route that once served the race track, but the route was actually constructed subsequent to the WB&A's demise, by the Pennsylvania Railroad from a point where that railroad crossed the Patuxent).
- MD 704 was built on the right-of-way.
- BGE still has power lines in service on the former right of way in Prince George's County. Originally, they supplied power for the railway and when the railroad dissolved, they never gave it up. As a result, BGE still has a service area overlapping Pepco, the utility serving the Washington, DC metropolitan area.
- A freight motor, Washington Baltimore & Annapolis #1, is maintained at the Western Railway Museum in Rio Vista, California.

== Acquisition ==
=== Baltimore-Washington Rapid Rail and the Northeast Maglev ===
In the 2010s, an effort to build a maglev railroad between Washington and Baltimore led the Baltimore-Washington Rapid Rail company (BWRR) to acquire a passenger railroad franchise previously held by the WB&A. The Maryland Public Service Commission (PSC) approved BWRR's application in 2015. BWRR, with its sister company Northeast Maglev, proposes to use the Japan-developed SCMaglev system to transport passengers from city to city in 15 minutes.

As of 2020, Northeast Maglev was working with the Federal Railroad Administration and Maryland Department of Transportation, the project sponsor, to prepare an Environmental Impact Statement for the proposed railroad.

In 2021, BWRR attempted to take control of a 43-acre parcel of land for its planned station in Baltimore's Westport neighborhood through eminent domain. It argued that its purchase of the WB&A franchise gave it authority to take the land.
