= Baltimore and Annapolis Railroad =

Former railway line in Maryland, US

Baltimore & Annapolis Railroad
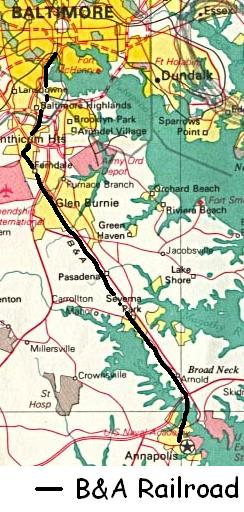
- Map of the B&A Railroad from 1970

Overview
- Headquarters: Annapolis, Maryland
- Locale: Annapolis and Baltimore, Maryland
- Dates of operation: 1887–1991

Technical
- Track gauge: 4 ft 8 1/2 in (1,435 mm) standard gauge
- Electrification: 6,600 V AC (1908–1914); Overhead line, 1,200 V DC (1914–1950)

The Baltimore & Annapolis Railroad (B&A) was an American railroad of central Maryland built in the 19th century to connect the cities of Baltimore and Annapolis. From 1897 to 1968 the railroad ran between Annapolis and Clifford along the north shore of the Severn River. From Clifford, just north of the present day Patapsco Light Rail Stop, it connected with the B&O's Curtis Bay branch so that trains could travel to Baltimore, though from 1914 to 1950 it bypassed this to travel instead to Carrol Junction and then to a terminal on Russell Street via the Camden Cutoff.

It had periods of bust and boom that resulted in different owners, changed names and abandonment and sale. It started operation in 1897 as the Annapolis and Baltimore Shortline, but changed its name in 1893 to the Baltimore and Annapolis Shortline, or often just the Annapolis Shortline. In 1914 it changed to electric power and in 1921 it was purchased by the larger Washington, Baltimore and Annapolis Electric Railway (WB&A). The WB&A went bankrupt in 1935 and the railroad emerged from the bankruptcy as the Baltimore & Annapolis Railroad. B&A electric passenger operation between the two cities continued until 1950 when the section of rail between Carrol Junction and Clifford Junction was purchased for the Baltimore-Washington Parkway. At that time the B&A switched to diesel and became solely a freight carrier while operating buses for passenger service. Freight service to Annapolis ceased in June 1968 and service south of Glen Burnie stopped in 1969. Tropical Storm Agnes damaged the Patapsco River bridge in 1972 stopping all service and the railroad unsuccessfully tried to abandon the whole line, but it was forced to resume service in the 1980s. In 1979, the line south of Glen Burnie was sold to various entities with the bulk of it turned into a rail trail. In 1991 the railroad was sold to the Maryland Transit Administration for a light rail line, service was stopped and the railroad was replaced.

After the light rail was completed, freight rail continued for a short time before being shut down in the 1990s. The B&A briefly continued operations in the Carolinas but stopped in the early 21st Century. The bulk of the right-of-way now serves as part of Baltimore's light rail system and as the Baltimore & Annapolis Trail.

== Annapolis and Baltimore Shortline ==
The Baltimore & Annapolis Railroad was chartered in 1880, by a group of New England promoters as the Annapolis and Baltimore Shortline and began running on March 3, 1887. This freight and passenger line was an integral link between Annapolis and Baltimore, transporting almost two million passengers per year until competition from nearby highways forced the railroads' closure. It was the second railroad to serve Annapolis and provided a faster connection to Baltimore, taking a more direct path along the north shore of the Severn River and then crossing the river into Annapolis. The railroad transformed the once-secluded banks of the Severn to a series of suburban communities.

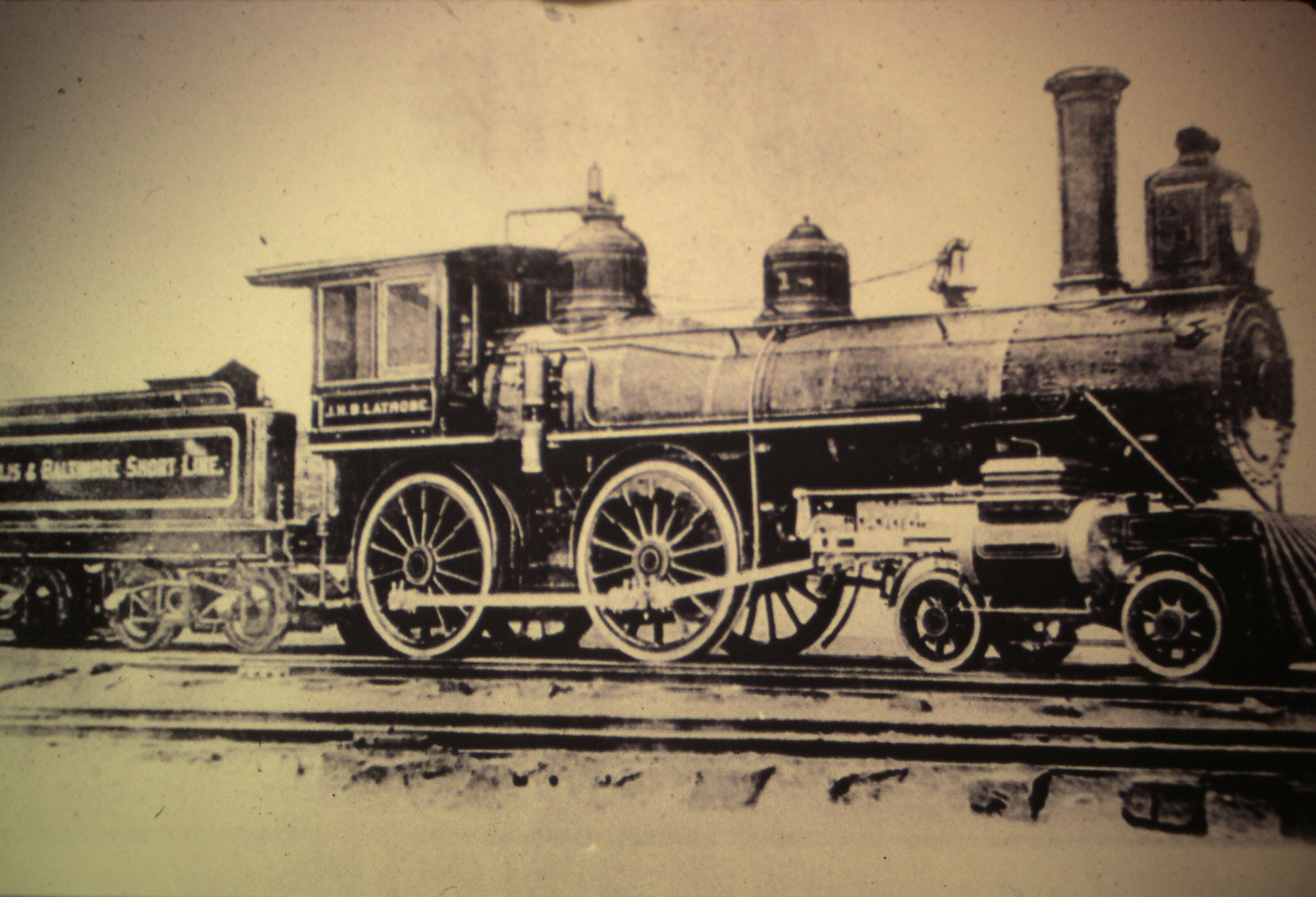
Annapolis & Baltimore Short Line 4-4-0 locomotive

The railroad started as a steam powered line running from a station in Annapolis, on Bladen Street just south of St. John's College, crossing the wide Severn River estuary on a long timber trestle, and on to Clifford on the B&O line, where it used the B&O tracks to terminate at Camden Station in Baltimore. Because the A&B Shortline created an almost straight line southeast from Baltimore it snatched much of the Baltimore-Annapolis trade away from the Annapolis, Washington & Baltimore Railroad on which passengers had to change trains at Odenton or Annapolis Junction.

At some point prior to 1892, a small connecting line was built between the A&B and the AW&B at the Bay Ridge Junction wye where the AW&B met the Annapolis and Bay Ridge Railroad.

== Baltimore & Annapolis Shortline ==
=== Reorganization ===
Business was slim in the early years, and in 1893 the railroad was sold to George Burnham Jr. and reorganized as the Baltimore & Annapolis Shortline the next year. Universally it was called simply “The Annapolis Shortline.”

=== Modernization ===
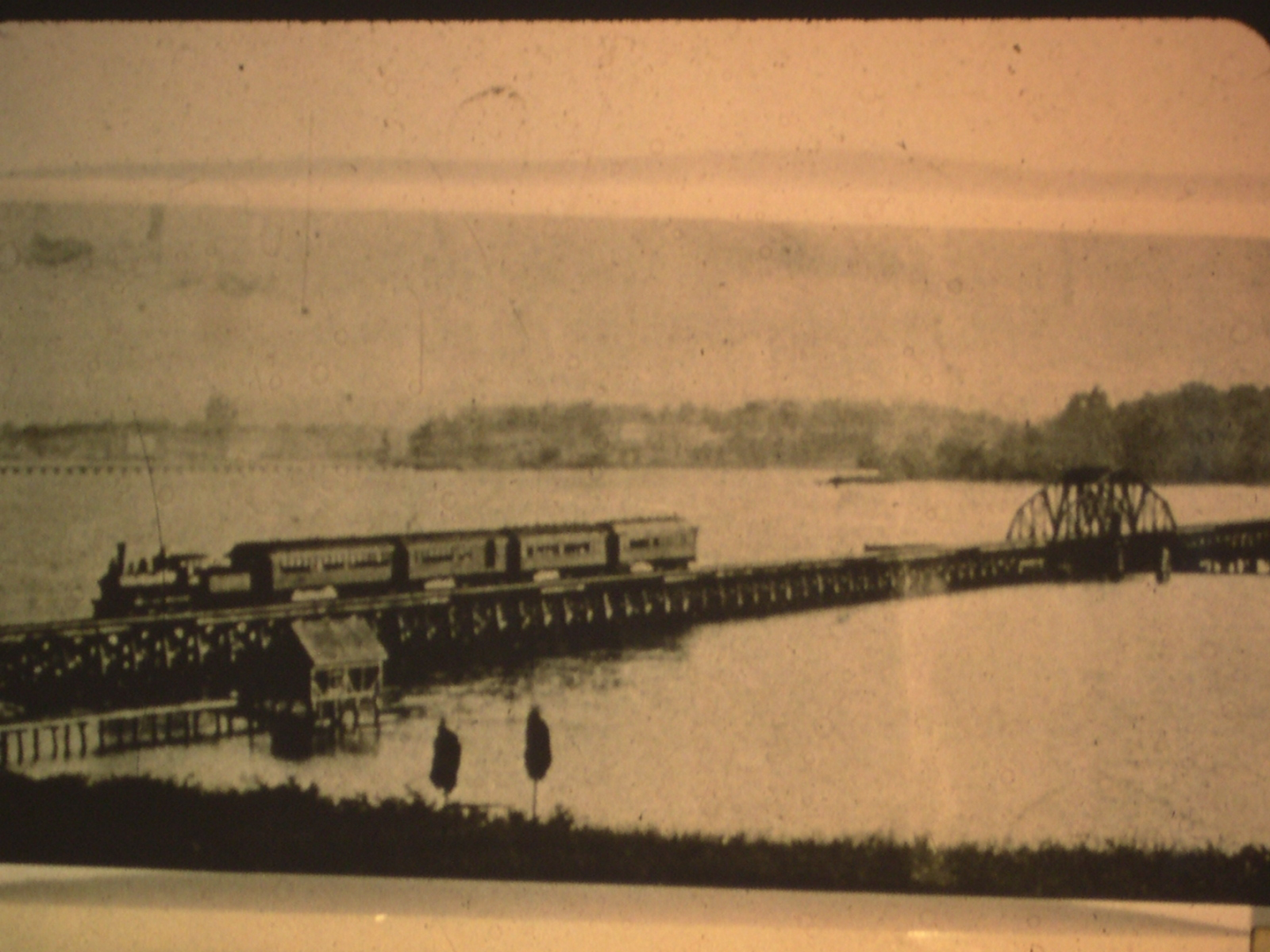
B&A Shortline crossing Severn River on trestle bridge

In 1906 the B&A began the process of electrifying its line which had been steam-powered since it opened. That process was completed in 1908 and it changed its name to the Maryland Electric Railways Company, providing clean, comfortable, faster, and more frequent service. That same year, the Washington, Baltimore and Annapolis Electric Railway built an electric rail line between Baltimore and Washington that ran adjacent to, and just to the west of, the B&A tracks between Linthicum and Clifford. Despite the upgrade, steam-powered trains continued to operate on the line until 1919.

Unlike most electric railways of its time, which employed a low voltage Direct Current electrification, the line installed a 6,600 volt, 25 cycle, single phase Alternating Current electrification system newly developed by the Westinghouse Electric & Manufacturing Company. The pioneering AC system was less than fully successful, however, and in 1914, new owners switched to DC. When it did, the B&O was wary of a high-voltage, as both the WB&A and Shortline then used 3300v AC over its tracks, overhead line between the Clifford interchange and Camden Station; so the B&O built a new line for the Shortline between Clifford Junction and its mainline at Russell Street. Leaving Clifford, the line ran immediately west/south of the Curtis Bay branch, passed under the Curtis Bay branch and then ran parallel to the South Baltimore branch, over the Western Maryland Railway and Gwynns Falls through Westport to Carrol Junction and the Camden Cutoff.

== North Shore Line ==
=== Purchase ===
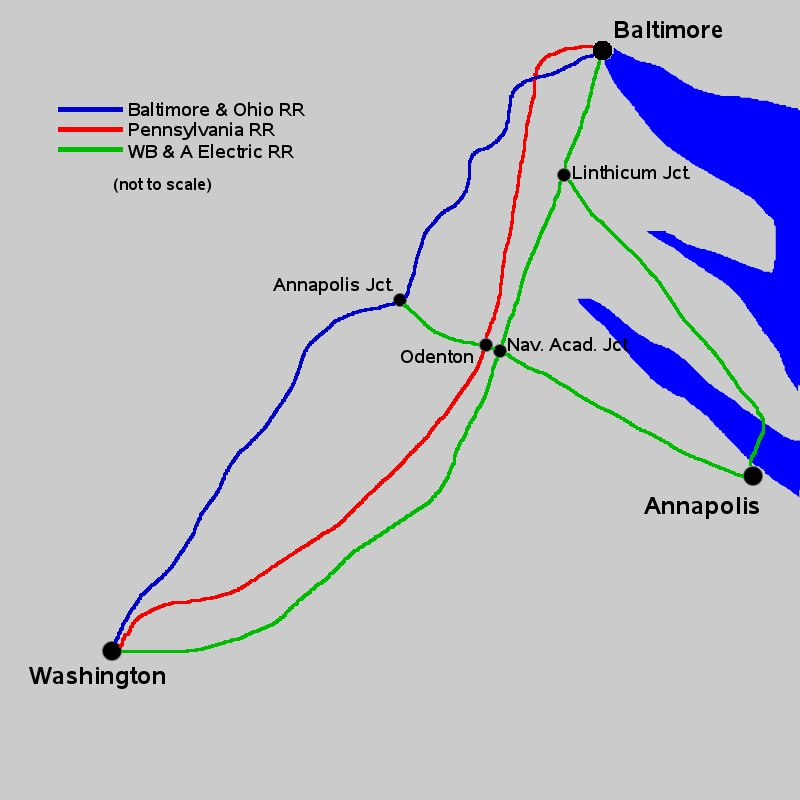
Map showing WB&A system, including former B&A line

During its heyday, the years between 1918 and the late 1920s, the B&A transported as many as 1,750,000 passengers per year between Baltimore and Annapolis. Trains left every hour from 6 am through 11 pm (during rush hours, the trains left every 30 minutes). Because of its strong performance, the neighboring WB&A bought the Annapolis Shortline in 1921 and it became part of the WB&A system in which it was called the North Shore Line. Afterward, Shortline trains were routed over the WB&A between Linthicum and the WB&A's new Baltimore terminal at the corner of Howard & Lombard Streets, now the site of a Holiday Inn. At the same time, most of the old Shortline track between Linthicum and Westport was abandoned, except for a section between Baltimore Highlands and the B&O Clifford interchange which was kept to handle freight to and from the B&O. The "new" (B&O-built) Annapolis Shortline ROW between Clifford and Westport was also retained for freight interchange, though this segment was later abandoned in 1979.

=== Bankruptcy ===
Gross receipts for the WB&A began to decline almost as soon as it bought the B&A in 1921. For the next decade, the WB&A only survived because of a law exempting it from taxes. In January 1931, the extension of the law failed to pass by one vote and the line went into receivership. The line remained in operation for four more years until it officially ceased on August 20, 1935. The WB&A was sold at public auction with scrap dealers buying most of the rolling stock. Selling the B&A rail for scrap would have cut off the capital from rail travel, so state officials and the Naval Academy convinced the bondholders not to scrap the B&A line. The right-of-way and some equipment were instead bought by the Bondholders Protective Society who then formed the Baltimore and Annapolis Railroad Company. This company negotiated an agreement with the B&O to use Camden Station as its Baltimore terminal, as the WB&A Terminal was eventually sold to one of its tenants Harry G. Pappas. The new company took over on August 21, 1935, for continuous operation.

== Baltimore and Annapolis Railroad ==
=== World War II ===
With the start of World War II and gas rationing, the B&A often ran with all available equipment in service. At semester breaks, holidays and graduation times the trains were packed with midshipmen from the United States Naval Academy, and the B&O ran steam trains to pick up teams and supporters to transport them to Philadelphia for the Army-Navy games. The B&A typically ran 5- and 6-car trains between Baltimore and Glen Burnie, with 3-cars continuing on the additional 20 miles (32 km) to Annapolis. The rail had 990,000 passengers in 1939, but that had increased to 2,000,000 by 1943.

In 1938 the company began running motor-coaches between Baltimore and Annapolis, and expanded in 1941 with a line serving Fort Meade from both cities. They expanded again in 1943 with service to Brooklyn-Curtis Bay. By 1943 the motor-coaches were carrying 1,000,000 passenger.

=== End of passenger service ===
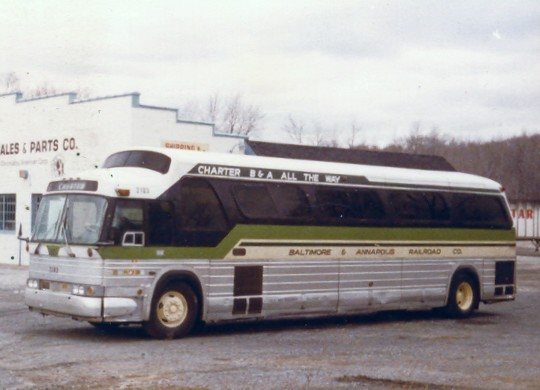
Baltimore and Annapolis Railroad Company's motorcoach # 2103 is a 1969 GM Buffalo 40′ model PD4903A with seating for 47 passengers, purchased new and used for charter service after 1973, seen in Pitman, New Jersey, in 1983.

Following World War II, gasoline and cars came back, highway expansion followed and passenger rail service became unprofitable. By 1939 the railroad was seeking permission to replace passenger rail with buses.

In 1947, the city began to negotiate the purchase of about 4000 feet of the railroad to Baltimore for use as part of the Baltimore-Washington Parkway (BW Parkway). The land ran from Russell Street to just north of the B&O's Curtis Bay Branch and consisted of the line that the B&A had used to access its Baltimore terminal. The B&A agreed to sell and clear the land for $450,000 on the condition that they could end passenger rail service because they were running an annual operating deficit of $100,000. At the time, the B&A was running 49 passenger trains and 3 freight trains between Baltimore and Annapolis.

In September 1949, the B&A formally requested permission to abandon passenger car service. In December 1949, the Public Services Commission granted their request to end passenger rail service but, as was demanded by city leaders along the line, required them to continue freight service. The B&A announced the end of passenger service that month. To prepare for the loss of passenger rail service the B&A began offering scheduled commuter bus service between Baltimore, Glen Burnie, and Annapolis, along with its passenger rail service. A proposal for the line to be acquired by the B&O Railroad for freight service was discarded when the B&O's studies concluded it would require $1.35 million in infrastructure improvements to bring it up to Class 1 railroad standards.

The B&A ended rail passenger service on February 5, 1950, and used the money from the sale of part of the line to purchase 11 more buses (creating a fleet of 42 for the route) and a new diesel electric locomotive. It reorganized into two companies, one that ran passenger buses and one that ran freight rail. The old bypass was removed north of the Curtis Bay Branch and part of it was replaced with the BW Parkway later that year; and the electric wires were removed from the remaining line.

In 1961, there was a 25-day experiment with commuter rail to Camden Station from Harundale, but it proved to be too slow. In addition the line continued to provide excursion rides (including bringing Santa to town or providing rides on Ferndale Day every May) into the 1980s.

=== Freight rail and partial abandonment ===
The B&A (by then nicknamed "The Bumble and Amble") purchased a diesel that it used to remain in freight service, serving as many as 40 different customers in 1963. It ran coal and building supplies to Annapolis until June 1968 when the Severn River Trestle was declared unsafe. It ceased operations across the trestle, but it never requested permission to abandon service there, and the Naval Academy converted their power and heating systems from coal to oil.

Following that, the freight terminated at Jones Station where Annapolis Lumber and Supply Company sent trucks to collect freight. In 1969 the B&A's Marley Creek Bridge was washed out and the B&A ceased service south of Glen Burnie, again without requesting permission to abandon the line. After that, all that remained in service was a six-mile (9.7 km) stub from the B&O Junction near Cherry Hill to Dorsey Road in Glen Burnie with occasional runs farther south to deliver sand or coal.

In June 1972, Tropical Storm Agnes washed out the B&A's Patapsco River Bridge. As a result, the B&A stopped operating south of the Patapsco River. Alco-Gravure, which owned a printing plant in Glen Burnie served by the B&A, quickly sued to force the B&A to restore service when negotiations failed. In response, the B&A filed to abandon operations over its entire 21.1 miles (34.0 km) of track in January 1973, a move that was supported by Anne Arundel County (which did not wish to support the industrial uses in that area that a freight rail line needed to be profitable) and the Maryland MTA. Further damage came around 1973 when the bridge over Dorsey Road was damaged by a tractor-trailer. In 1975, following an adverse decision by an ICC administrative law judge, the courts found that B&A had illegally abandoned operations and the ICC eventually forced them to repair the bridge and resume operations to Glen Burnie, which happened sometime after 1979.

In 1973, after trains stopped running due to the damaged bridge, State Senator Alfred J. Lipin proposed turning the rail line into a trail. The MTA was already planning to use the right-of-way for transit if the abandonment was allowed and Lipin's constituents didn't want it turned into a busway; but Lipin noted that even if had transit, it could still have a trail too. The next year, while service was down and the abandonment cases were litigated, the Severna Park Jaycees leased the unused portion of the track through town for the purpose of a trail and together with other Jaycees they cleared the ROW for hiking and advocated to make it a county-owned trail and park. In 1976, after losing their case to abandon the whole railroad; the B&A, Anne Arundel County and Annapolis requested permission to abandon the 15 miles between Glen Burnie, MD, and Annapolis. Permission was granted in 1978 and the rail south of Glen Burnie was abandoned.

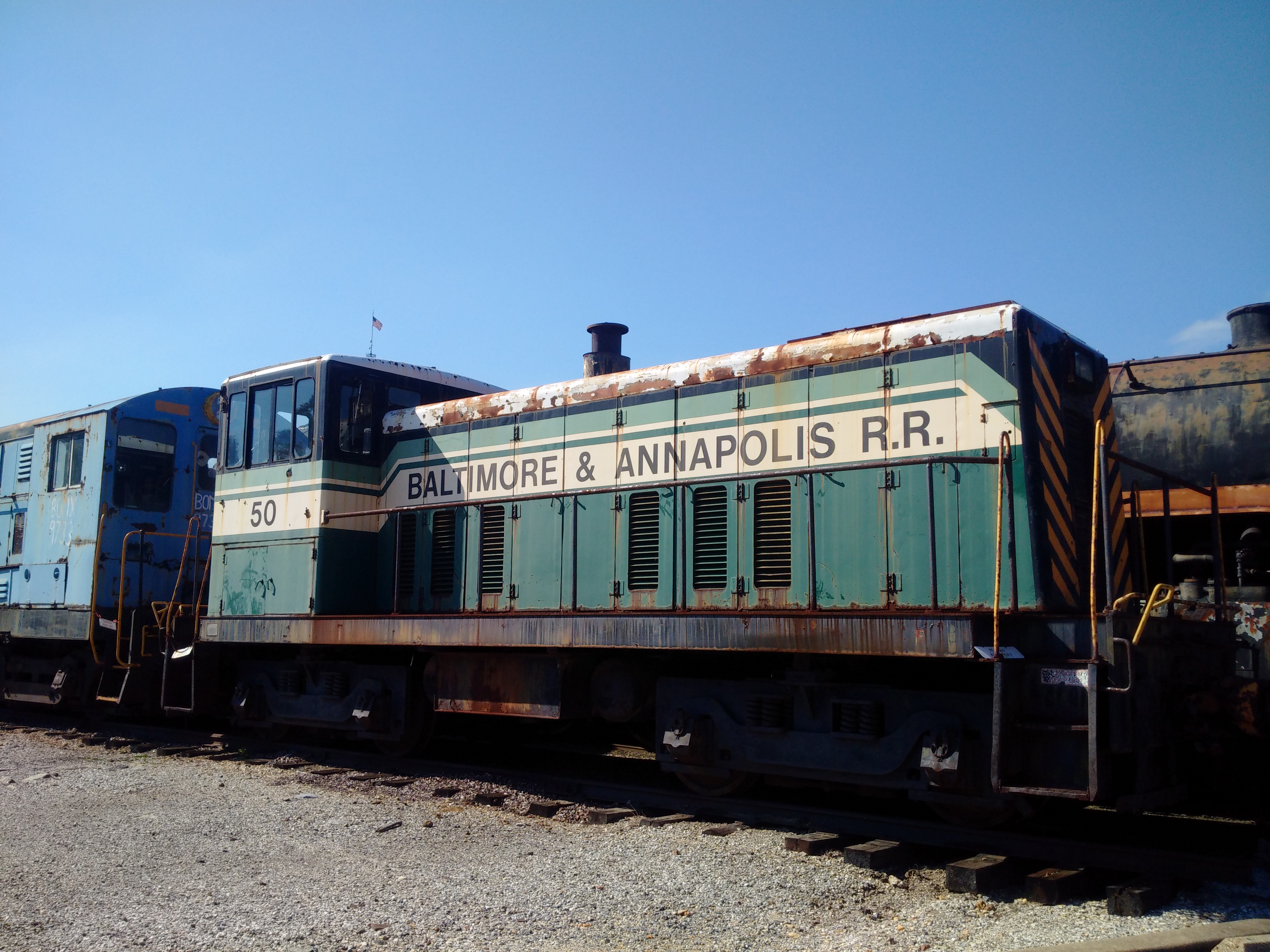
B&A #50, awaiting restoration at the B&O Railroad Museum

In 1973, the Baltimore & Annapolis Railroad's public bus system was absorbed by Maryland Transit Administration (MTA) as Route 14. The company continued as a charter bus service but that ceased in 1982.

=== Disposition of the B&A ===
The state began eyeing the B&A for rapid transit passenger service to Baltimore as early as 1963, but it would take decades for that to happen, and over the intervening years the line would shrink through a series of abandonments and sell its property to various entities.

In 1979, Anne Arundel County purchased the no longer used section of the 66-foot (20 m) wide right of way from Dorsey Road in Glen Burnie to the north shore of the Severn River for the purpose of creating the Baltimore & Annapolis Trail and park.

In 1983, the B&A sold the right-of-way from the south shore of the Severn River to Annapolis Street, as well as the trestle across the Severn, to the Wardour Improvement Association (WIA), an Annapolis homeowners association, for $1.

In the spring of 1984, the railroad — consisting of the 6 mile long, 70-foot wide right-of-way, a 1950 diesel-engine, a flat car, a motorized track-inspection car and some miscellaneous property — was sold to Ken Pippin for less than $1 million. At that point it served a lumber company and two paper companies in Anne Arundel County.

On September 16, 1987, to celebrate the 100th Anniversary of the B&A, B&A number 50 made one final run on the line from Linthicum Station to Camden Station. It was then donated to and retired at the B&O Railroad Museum. The freight line continued to operate with a 1953 1200-horsepower diesel.

In the same year, WIA sold the western part of their right-of-way in Annapolis to Wardour Bluff Apartments at the end of Shiley Street and to property owners at the end of Tolson Street.

In 1986 WIA donated the Severn River Railroad Trestle to the Maryland Department of Natural Resources so that they could demolish it and 1989, it was declared a navigational hazard and what remained of it was torn down. The draw and sections of the bridge north and south of it had been removed by 1983.

MTA had been talking about turning the B&A into a transit line since at the early 1960s, but it took 20 years to become reality. In 1967 a Maryland Mass transit steering committee was formed and quickly identified the B&A line as a good candidate for a mass transit system to Harundale or perhaps as far as Annapolis. In 1987 the state commissioned a study of options for turning the rail line, perhaps as far as Annapolis, into a light rail line. Negotiations started shortly thereafter. In May 1991, Maryland bought the still active part of the B&A railroad for the southern leg of the light rail system for $9 million, but the state had to promise to maintain freight operations to appease the Interstate Commerce Commission. The railroad ceased operation in the following months. Work pulling up the rails started in September 1991 and was completed on February 18, 1992.

=== Light rail and rail-trail ===
In 1985, the Anne Arundel County Parks department started work on a rail-trail south of Dorsey Avenue. In 1990, work was completed on the Baltimore & Annapolis Rail Trail and it opened on October 7.

The light rail line along the old B&A right-of-way opened in three parts in 1992 and 1993. A three-station extension to Patapsco, just across the county line in Anne Arundel that used about 1000 feet of the B&A ROW, opened on August 20, 1992. That was followed by a 4-station extension to Linthicum on April 2, 1993, and an additional 2-station extension to Glen Burnie on June 20, 1993.

Starting in early 1992, the state provided freight service to Quebecor Printing Inc. (formerly Alco-Gravure) in Glen Burnie via the state-owned Canton Railroad. Once light rail trains started operations to Linthicum however the freight rail service had to moved to nights.

In 1996, MTA commissioned a study to analyze the environmental impact of extending the light rail 0.75 miles (1.21 km) along the B&A right-of-way, by then the B&A Trail, as far south as 1st Avenue in Glen Burnie.

== Baltimore and Annapolis in the Carolinas ==
During negotiations for the sale of the B&A's right-of-way, one of the sticking points was that the B&A wanted to retain exclusive rights to run freight on the line at night. They relented on this, but when the sale went through they were still hoping to continue to run freight with the rolling stock they retained. They did not get the freight contract and so began looking elsewhere to use their rolling stock and invest their profits from the sale of the right-of-way.

On February 9, 1995, the Baltimore and Annapolis Railroad Company, by that time merely an entity on paper with a locomotive, filed to acquire and operate approximately 75.9 miles (122.1 km) of rail line from the Mid Atlantic Railroad, which operated track between Mullin's, SC and Whiteville NC, and between Chadbourn, NC and Conway, SC. This line was operated under the name Carolina Southern Railroad (reporting marks CALA). All public business outside of federal railroad filings were performed under the auspices of the CALA.

In June 2001, the Waccamaw Coast Line Railroad (WCLR), a new division of the B&A, filed to operate 14.1 miles (22.7 km) of railroad owned by Horry County, SC between the current terminus of the CALA in Conway, SC and the city of Myrtle Beach, SC where the line ended. The WCLR had operated under the direct ownership of the county prior to its ownership by the B&A. The right of way continued to be owned by the county and was initially leased to the B&A for a period of 30 years. Operations by the B&A started shortly after filing.

The B&A's operation and major ownership of railroad lines in the Carolinas ended on December 18, 2015, with the sale of all but one mile of its CALA rail lines to the R.J. Corman Railroad Group, operating under a new railroad for this line, R. J. Corman Railroad Company/Carolina Lines, LLC (RJCS). The one additional mile that remains under the ownership of the CALA was leased to the RJCS. The company also retained ownership of the Conway, SC depot and other land assets along the right of way. The railroad lines had been out of service since 2011 due to Federal Railroad Administration (FRA) orders to repair bridges along the line, which the company could not afford to perform. Horry County had placed the railroad in default over lack of lease payments during this time period. The B&A has not operated publicly under the name Baltimore and Annapolis Railroad Company during its time owning and operating rail lines in the Carolinas, but does roster one former C&O EMD SW9 in B&A paint (#87), and a former N&W boxcar lettered for the B&A which are still stored in Chadbourn, North Carolina, as of May 2019.

== Stations ==
The Baltimore and Annapolis Railroad served the following stations:

- Camden Station
- Carroll (B&O station at Monroe Street)
- (Junction with B&O's South Baltimore Branch (SBB) in Westport, just south of the crossing of the Western Maryland Railway Tide Subdivision)
- Clifford (north of Patapsco Avenue, next to the B&O Curtis Bay Branch)
- Baltimore Highlands (between Georgia and Illinois Avenues, across from the Washington, Baltimore and Annapolis Electric Railroad station)
- Pumphrey (Baltimore Annapolis Boulevard and Belle Grove Road, where the latter now curves)
- Linthicum Heights (Maple Road)
- Shipley (Camp Meade Road)
- Woodlawn Heights
- Garland
- Ferndale (earlier Wellham) (Wellham Avenue)
- Cromwell (I-97)
- Glen Burnie (Crain Highway)
- Saunders Range
- Oakwood (Oakwood Road)
- Marley (Marley Station Mall)
- Elvaton (Elvaton Road)
- Pasadena (formerly Pleasantena)
- Earleigh Heights (Earleigh Heights Road) (formerly Frost)
- Robinson (Robinson Road)
- Boone Station (later Severna Park)
- Round Bay (Round Bay Road)
- Jones (Jones Station Road)
- Revell (Old County Road)
- Joyce (Joyce Lane)
- Arnold (Arnold Road)
- Asberry (Severn Way)
- Winchester (Winchester Road)
- Severnside
- Wardour (Wardour Drive, where the railway crossed the Severn River)
- West Annapolis
- Annapolis (at the Bladen Street terminus)

== Surviving landmarks ==
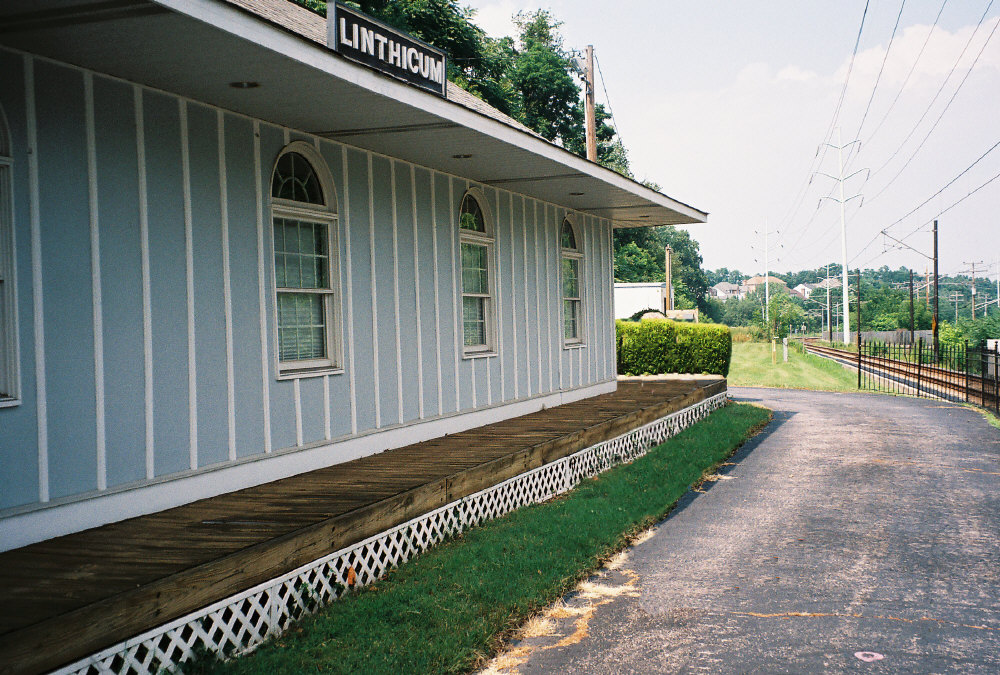
Facing north at the old WB&A and B&A Linthicum Heights station, where the MTA Light Rail line joins the original WB&A right-of-way

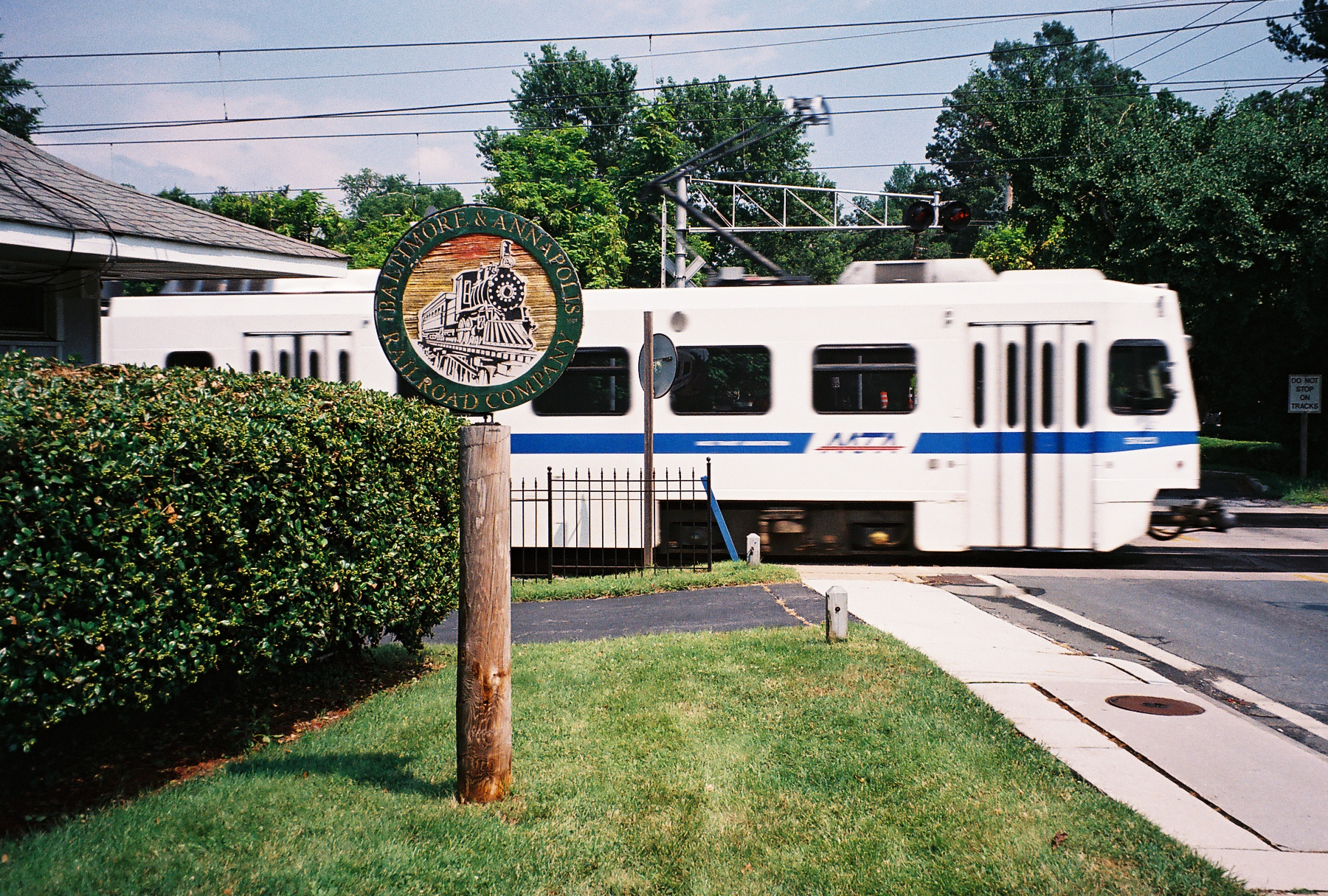
A southbound MTA Light Rail train passes the old B&A Linthicum Heights station at Maple Road, with a B&A Railroad commemorative marker in the foreground.

=== Rights of way ===
The Hunt Valley-Glen Burnie MTA Light Rail system utilizes several portions of the former B&A railway:

- Cromwell Station in Glen Burnie to a point north of Maple Road, where it moves onto the original WB&A right-of-way
- Baltimore Highlands to Patapsco Avenue Station
- Continues on a "new" B&A right-of-way to Westport, passing under the CSX line on a bridge originally built in 1908 to carry the B&O over the B&A
- leaves the B&A at Waterview Avenue.

The Baltimore & Annapolis Trail uses the right-of-way from Glen Burnie to Arnold, just outside Annapolis.

The right-of-way south of the Severn River to Taylor Avenue is used by power lines and is owned by several different owners. Between Shiley Street and Old Crossing lane, it hosts an unnamed, unpaved public trail and from Old Crossing to the Severn it hosts an unnamed, unpaved trail owned by and for the exclusive use of Wardour Improvement Association residents.

=== Extant track ===
- The B&A switch remains at Clifford and connects CSXT's Curtis Bay Branch with the Light Rail. Though it exists, this switch is no longer used.
- A section of track still exists at the intersection of Baltimore Annapolis Blvd and Jones Station Rd in Severna Park.
- A dual section of track still exists under the power lines in an overgrowth area just north of the intersection of Jumpers Hole Road in Severna Park.
- There is extant track from the Annapolis side of the Severn River to Tucker Street in West Annapolis. It is broken into sections and in places there is an unpaved trail running between the tracks.

=== Other features ===
- Extant bridge abutments over the Patapsco River downstream from the light rail bridge.
- B&A #50 a GE (General Electric) 70 ton diesel locomotive survives at the B&O railroad museum in Baltimore Maryland.
- B&A #87 an EMD SW9 survives stored in Chadbourn, NC along with a BLA lettered boxcar #41449.
- Kent Road Bridge over the old right-of-way and tracks in the Wardour part of Annapolis - now for bikes and pedestrians only.

=== Buildings ===
The following stations are still standing:

- Earleigh Heights Station: now the Park Ranger Station and B&A Railroad Museum
- Linthicum Heights Station
- Severna Park Station

The following former stations are currently private residences:

- Round Bay Station
- Revell Station (at Old County & Baltimore Annapolis Blvd)
- Woodlawn Station

The Baltimore Annapolis Railroad Powerhouse at Jones Station Road was built in 1904 to provide power to the railroad and renovated in 1989 when the trail was built. As Part of state highway project, a bike lane along route 50 and the Severn River Bridge, connected the trail to Annapolis. It now hosts an antique shop. In between it hosted an ice house, a restaurant and the Anne Arundel County Historic Society's headquarters.
