= Baltimore and Drum Point Railroad =

Planned Railroad

The Baltimore and Drum Point Railroad was a planned 34-mile railroad intended to connect eastern Maryland, the city of Baltimore, and the port at Drum Point, Maryland.

Conceived in 1856 and chartered in 1868, the railroad began construction in 1873, but was halted a year later by the Panic of 1873. Work resumed in 1888. By 1891, 25 miles of right-of-way had been prepared for tracks, trestles were constructed across the St. Leonard's and Hunting Creeks, locally cut railroad ties were in place, and 8,000 tons of steel rails were on their way from Pittsburgh. But the project was halted again when citizens of Anne Arundel County sued to cancel the funding. They won on a technicality: the bond issue referendum to finance construction was advertised for only 59 days rather than the requisite 60 days.

Other efforts were made to restart the project, the last in 1924, when four railroads were already operating in the area and already seeing competition from highways and cars.
