= Piney Orchard Nature Preserve =

Protected area in Maryland

- IUCN category IV (habitat/species management area)
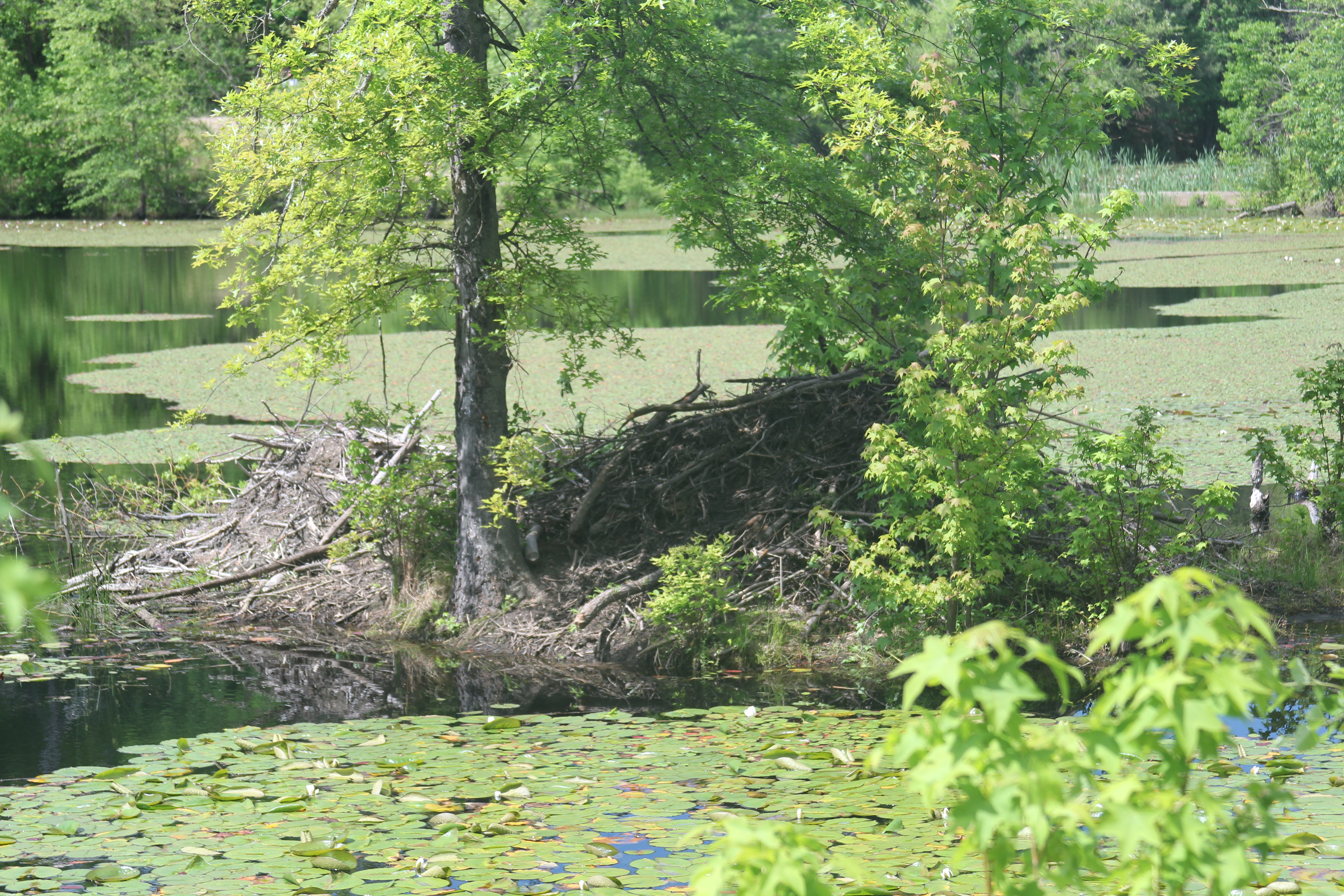
- Piney Orchard Nature Preserve; 8702 Nature's Trail Court; Odenton, MD 21113

- Location within Maryland Location within the United States
- Location: Anne Arundel County, Maryland, United States
- Nearest city: Odenton, Maryland
- Coordinates: 39°03′37″N 76°43′37″W
- Area: 45 acres (0.18 km^{2})
- Established: 1987
- Governing body: Piney Orchard Community Association

Piney Orchard Nature Preserve is a 45-acre (18 ha) protected wetland forest with several miles of improved trails located in southern Odenton, Maryland. The preserve is surrounded by 1,500 acres of river woodland between the residential communities of Piney Orchard, Two Rivers, Woodwardville, and Amberfield. Piney Orchard Nature Preserve is bordered by the Patuxent Research Refuge to the west, the Little Patuxent River to the south, and the Washington, Baltimore and Annapolis Trail to the east.

Initiated in 1987, Constellation Real Estate (an Exelon Corporation subsidiary) started restoration of wetlands along the Little Patuxent River that had been mined for sand and gravel during the 1940s and '50s and remained deserted and unrestored. The mitigation projects—a term used for this type of restoration—followed five phases to replace wetlands filled in by the development of the 4,000-unit Piney Orchard residential community, which included the formation and enhancement of five large ponds and planting of native trees, shrubs, and grasses. The Army Corps of Engineers, which oversees such mitigations, monitored the progress of the project sites until 1995, when the projects were determined successful and completed. In 1996 the Piney Orchard Nature Preserve was officially opened to all residents of Anne Arundel County, and has been managed since 2005 by the Piney Orchard Community Association.

As of March 3, 2024, 768 species of plants and animals have been reported in Piney Orchard Nature Preserve, which sustains a wide diversity of wildlife in wetland, woodland, and grassland habitats. Around 165 species of birds refuge in the preserve, 26 species of which are threatened or endangered, including bald eagles, bitterns (heron family), cormorants (ocean divers), grebes (lake divers), harriers (eagle family), hawks (eagle family), herons (pond fishers), juncos (a.k.a. 'snowbirds'), mergansers (pond divers), merlins (falcon family), and teals (aquatic). Only 1,000 feet separate Patuxent Research Refuge from Piney Orchard Nature Preserve, separated by the train tracks of the Amtrak Northeast Corridor; thus unofficially the smaller Preserve is an unincorporated portion of the larger refuge, which supports a similar and larger set of native flora and fauna around 3,300 species.

The 5 miles of biking and hiking trails in Piney Orchard Nature Preserve connect to the regional 10-mile Washington, Baltimore and Annapolis Trail that joins the national 6,800-mile American Discovery Trail spanning coast-to-coast from California to Delaware.
