= Washington, Baltimore and Annapolis Trail =

Rail trail in Maryland, United States

WB&A Trail
- Length: 11.7 mi (18.8 km)
- Location: Anne Arundel and Prince George's counties, Maryland, USA
- Trailheads: Annapolis Rd and Seltzer St; Lanham, Maryland; 38°57′29″N 76°49′29.4″W; Odenton Rd and Piney Orchard Pkwy; Odenton, Maryland; 39°5′2.2″N 76°42′0.5″W
- Use: Hiking, biking
- Difficulty: Easy
- Season: Year-round
- Sights: Patuxent River, Little Patuxent River
- Hazards: Tick-borne diseases Limited water Poison ivy Venomous snakes

The Washington, Baltimore and Annapolis Trail (WB&A) is an 11.7-mile (18.8 km) long rail trail from Lanham to Odenton in Maryland. The trail gets its name from the Washington, Baltimore and Annapolis Electric Railway on whose right-of-way it runs, but does not connect to any of the cities in its name.

The trail formerly existed in two separate pieces, one in Anne Arundel County and the other in Prince George's County, separated by the Patuxent River. Construction of a bridge over the river was delayed for over two decades due to a property dispute; however, the trail was realigned and design of the bridge began in 2002. It was completed in spring of 2025 with a grand opening later.

Additional plans exist to extend the trail southward to the Washington, D.C. border.

The WB&A Trail makes up part of both the East Coast Greenway - from Calais, Maine to Key West, Florida - and the American Discovery Trail - from the Atlantic coast of Delaware to San Francisco, California.

== Places served ==
From south to north, the trail passes through the following locations:

- Lanham (terminus)
- Glenn Dale
- Bowie (Huntington Section)
- Piney Orchard
- Odenton (terminus)

== Route description ==
The trail runs 11.7 miles from Lanham within Prince George's County to Odenton Road in Odenton, within Anne Arundel County and over the Patuxent River on a bridge built in 2025.

=== Lanham to MD 193 ===
The trail begins next to MD 450 near Lanham, just to the north of that route's intersection with MD 704. Closely paralleled by a BG&E 33kV distribution line, the trail runs due northeast, crossing the Folly Branch, before encountering a major BG&E electrical substation. Here, the 33kV line enters the substation and is replaced by a much larger BG&E transmission line; the line runs parallel to the trail all the way to Bowie.

Past the substation, the trail shares the WB&A's right-of-way with the power line and a local street, named Railroad Avenue. Just past Walnut Ave., the road is also known as Electric Avenue. At milepost 1, the trail passes to the north of the Glenn Dale Hospital, a defunct hospital now closed and scheduled for demolition. Near the hospital site, the trail is served by ample parking near its crossing of MD 953 Glenn Dale Road, the original route of MD 193. Beyond the crossing (at which trail users must stop before crossing), the trail diverts away from the WB&A alignment to run along Old Pond Drive; after running parallel for a short distance, the trail turns to the north for a very short distance before rejoining the WB&A alignment. Both trail and road share the alignment for a short distance before the latter meets Bell Station Road at a T-junction; beyond here, the trail runs alone through a suburban neighborhood, crossing beneath the dual carriageway of MD 193 via a short tunnel.

=== MD 193 to Bowie ===
Past MD 193, the trail runs through various suburban neighborhoods, screened by undeveloped land. At milepost 2, the trail crosses the Horsepen Branch near its headwaters. Near milepost 2.5, the trail crosses Hillmeade Road via a truss bridge; access to the road is via Daisy Lane. Beyond Hillmeade Road, the trail right-of-way is abutted by suburban development, with the BG&E power line a constant companion. Continuing northeast, the trail meets a pair of driveways just to the north of milepost 3 before once sharing the right-of-way with a local street, Mockingbird Lane. Beyond the start of the street, the trail quickly crosses several neighborhood streets on the level at milepost 3.5 before flying over High Bridge Road and a CSX railway line via a pair of truss bridges.

Beyond the second truss bridge, the trail runs past the back of a number of houses before serving as a driveway once again. Near the point where the first driveway merges with the trail (close to milepost 4), the BG&E transmission line quickly descends to ground level and turns due north, following two more transmission lines north to BG&E's Jericho Park substation. Just beyond the transmission line cut, another BG&E 33kV distribution line appears; this one is partially out-of-use and parallels the trail all the way to Odenton. The trail itself passes to the northwest of the Bowie Golf and Country Club before meeting several other driveways and Normal School Road, a former alignment of MD 197; interspersed with these junctions are two more crossings of the Horsepen Branch. Eventually, the trail itself crosses MD 197 via yet another truss bridge, the longest bridge on the entire trail. Access to the trail from MD 197 is provided via a driveway; after crossing the bridge, the trail meets it immediately beyond the driveway's intersection with MD 197, and a STOP sign is posted for the protection of trail users.

The trail and the driveway run east-northeast, passing just to the south of a local shooting range; the driveway ends at the gates of the range, while the trail continues onward. Protected by a low sound barrier, this portion of the trail is again screened from nearby neighborhoods by undeveloped land. Near milepost 5.5, the trail crosses the Horsepen Branch again before passing beneath Race Track Road at milepost 5.5 via another tunnel, similar in design to the tunnel under MD 193. Beyond here, the trail curves upward and terminates at another parking lot.

=== Bowie to the Patuxent River ===
At the far end of the parking lot, a gate protects an access road to the Horsepen water pumping station; a gap in the gate permits access for WSSC, BG&E and M-NCPPC purposes; the latter covers users of the WB&A Trail.

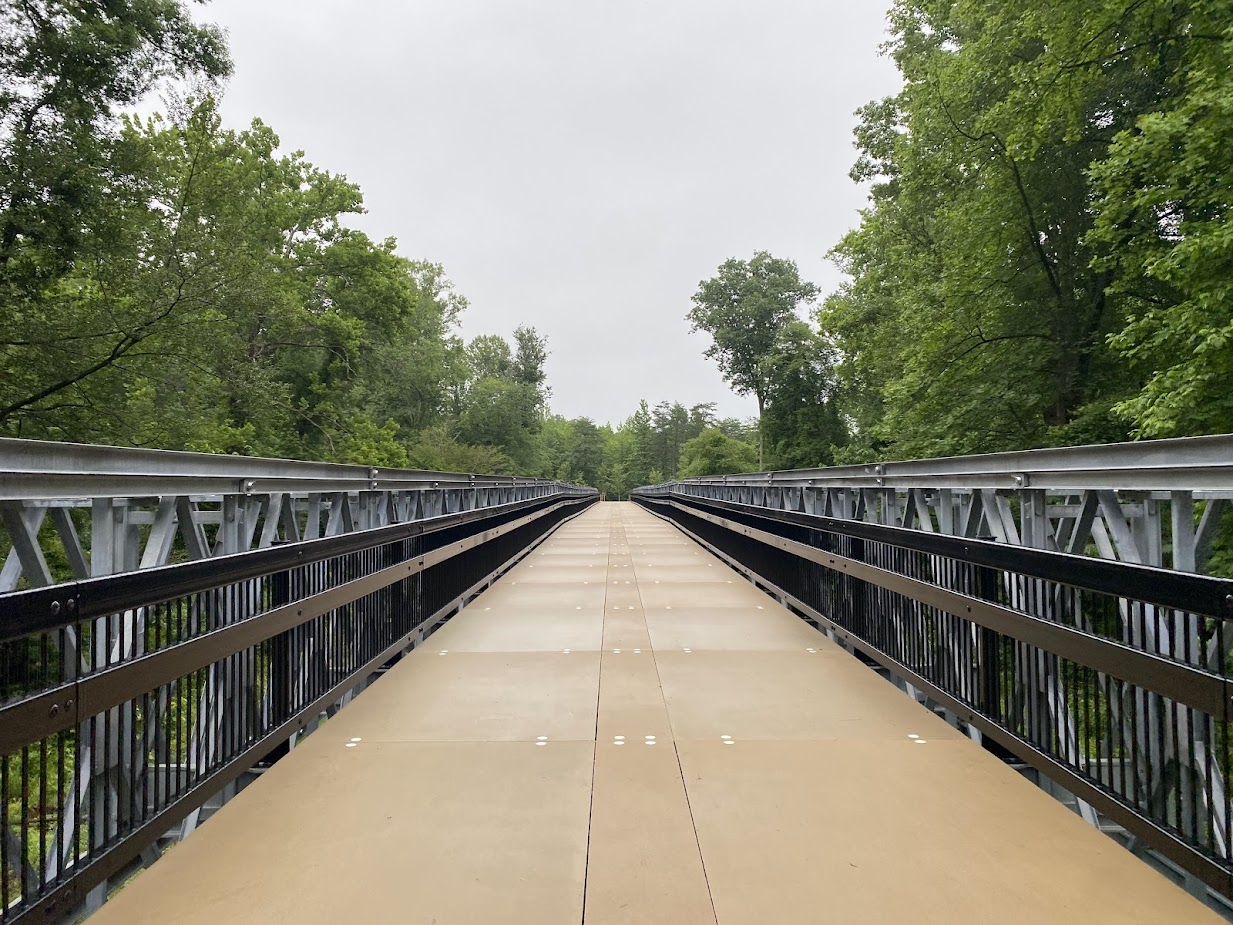
View east on Washington, Baltimore and Annapolis trail in Bowie

At the far end of the access road, the trail resumes, turning north and then northeast again before detouring from the ROW along the Patuxent River on what was once called "the WB&A Spur Trail"; the trail passes through Patuxent River Park and the Fran Uhler Natural Area before crossing the river on a bridge. From Horsepen, the old main trail continues northeast for an eighth of a mile, crossing a tributary of the Horsepen Branch just west of its junction with the Patuxent, before terminating at a turnaround near the Prince George's County bank of the Patuxent River. At the site of the turnaround, the former abutments and supports of the WB&A's railway bridge can be seen, and on the far side of the river (on the Anne Arundel County side), the WB&A railroad's formation can be seen continuing northeast alongside the BG&E distribution line. A wooden sign, facing to the north, can also be seen from the turnaround near the riverbank.

=== Patuxent River to Bragers Road ===
The trail resumes on the Anne Arundel County side of the Patuxent River. The trail follow a longer winding path through the Two River Open Space. The trail climbs a steep hill from the banks of the Patuxent River before crossing Conway Road. It then turns east and parallels Conway Road as it passes through The Villages at Two Rivers before turning again north again and rejoining the old WB&A Railroad right-of-way on Bragers Road.

=== Bragers Road to Piney Orchard ===
The trail continues northeast on Bragers Road, a local street serving houses alongside the northern side of the trail. Other than the houses, this portion of the trail passes through undeveloped land, consisting mainly of forest and wetlands. The trail and the roadway share the right-of-way all the way to Patuxent Road, where the roadway ends.

Continuing across Patuxent Road (where trail users must also give way to road users), the trail continues through more wetlands and forest before crossing the Little Patuxent River via a newly constructed truss bridge. Past this truss bridge, the trail runs to the south of the Piney Orchard Nature Preserve before crossing another watercourse via another truss bridge. Beyond the second bridge, the trail meets a side trail that enters the preserve and eventually enters Piney Orchard proper at its crossing of Strawberry Lake Way.

=== Piney Orchard to Odenton ===
Beyond Strawberry Lake Way, the BG&E 33kV distribution line is in active use again; several transformers can be seen to the side of the trail, next to an artificial drainage pond. Past the pond, the trail runs through the heart of Piney Orchard, although it continues to be screened by a buffer of undeveloped land. The trail meets several side trails, providing access to the individual neighborhoods of Piney Orchard and Chapel Grove, before reaching another grade crossing at Waugh Chapel Road. Here, there is no direct crossing of the roadway, and trail users must turn south and use the sidewalk next to the road before crossing over and backtracking to the trail.

Beyond Waugh Chapel Road, the trail enters Odenton and passes beneath Old Waugh Chapel Road via a third tunnel before continuing through more suburban neighborhoods. More side trails are encountered as the trail runs north-northeast, crossing June Drive on the level. Beyond June Drive, the trail soon meets Piney Orchard Parkway and runs alongside it before terminating at Odenton Road, near its intersection with Piney Orchard Parkway. At the terminus, trail users can either continue north along a sidewalk or turn east and follow a Shared Use Path / Multi-User Path along Odenton Road to its terminus with MD 175. The trail will ultimately connect with the South Shore Trail at its terminus in Odenton. Recently, new signage advertising a bike route to Odenton station on the Northeast Corridor has appeared at the northern terminus.

== History ==
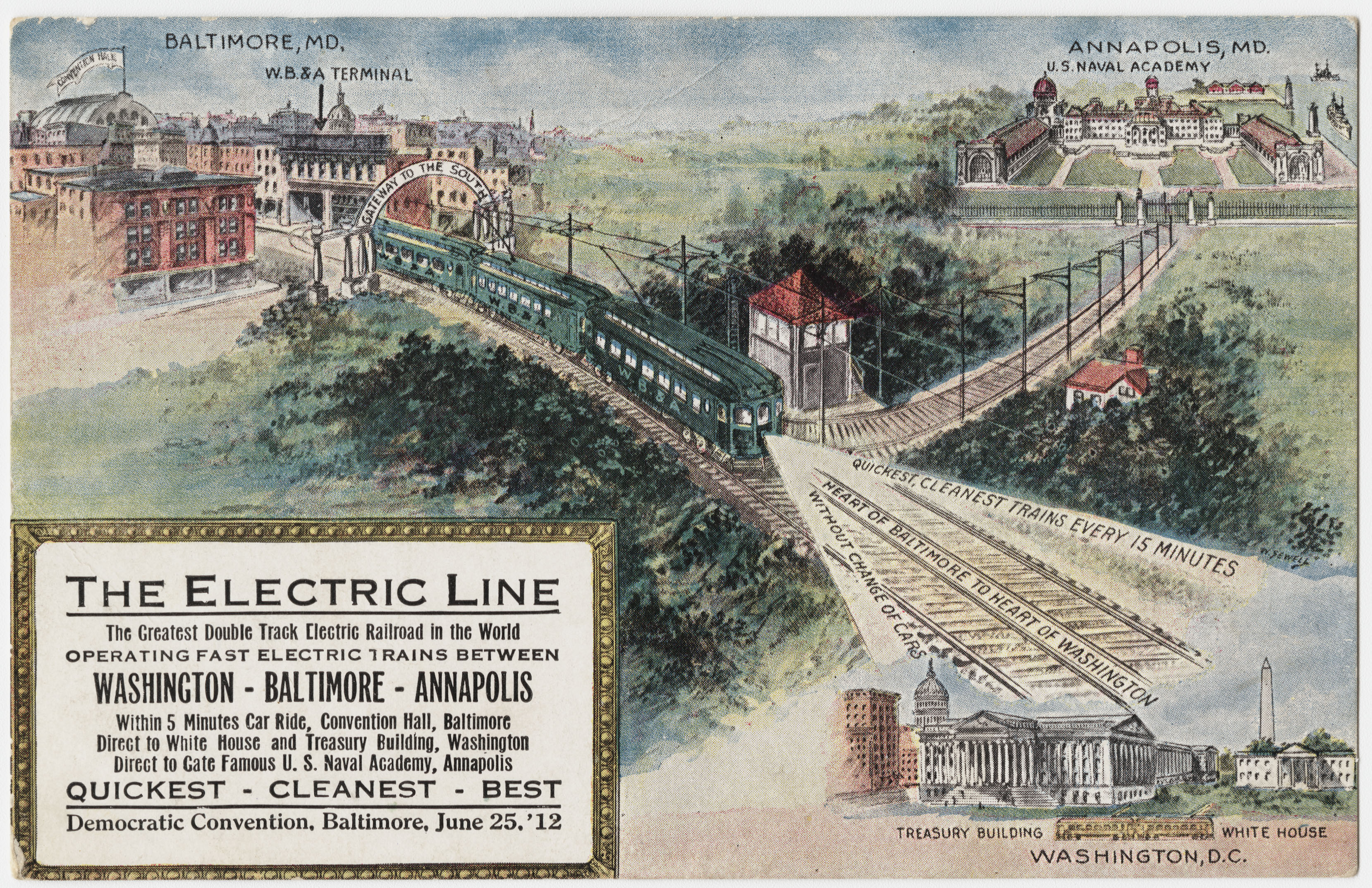
Electric railroad from Baltimore, Maryland to Annapolis, Maryland and Washington DC, circa 1912.

The trail derives its name from the defunct Washington, Baltimore and Annapolis Electric Railway along whose right-of-way the trail now runs. From 1908 through 1935, state-of-the-art electric commuter trains ran along this route carrying passengers between Washington, DC, and Baltimore. The same railroad's right of way also serves as the basis for the Baltimore & Annapolis Trail, South Shore Trail, Poplar Trail and the Odenton Bike Path.

The trail was envisioned in the mid-1980s and 1990s. In the 1980s Morris Warren, a Prince George's County trail advocate, began pushing the county to turn the railroad right-of-way into a trail. Warren founded the Prince George's WB & A Trail Club prior to 1991 for that purpose. Meanwhile, Maryland State Delegate Marsha Perry (D-Crofton) introduced several bills to study turning the right-of-way into a trail, possibly with a light rail, and by 1990 she had secured an agreement with developers of the Piney Orchard project to donate their portion of the right-of-way to the county. In July 1991, Prince George's County Executive Parris N. Glendening announced definitive plans to open that county's section of trail, and later that year, the entire ROW from Baltimore to Lanham was included in the Baltimore-Washington Greenway plan. Around the same time Anne Arundel County began planning what was originally known as the West County Trail (WCT) along a piece of the right-of-way between Prince George's and Odenton. It showed up in Maryland planning material as early as 1992.

In 1994, 4.1 miles of the railroad right-of-way in Anne Arundel County was given to the county for the WCT by Constellation Real Estate to meet open space and recreational space requirements as part of their development of Piney Orchard. The right-of-way in Prince George's county, parts of which were owned by Amtrak, the state of Maryland and the Washington Suburban Sanitary Commission was purchased in 1995, clearing the way for construction. In the same year, Anne Arundel County finished the West County Trail Master Plan.

In Anne Arundel County, a dispute over the ownership of the section near the Patuxent River began to emerge as trail construction became imminent. The WB&A railroad ran alongside a plot of land belonging to Buz Meyer, a local conservationist, outdoors enthusiast and trail opponent. Meyer and his brother Robert had long argued that the trail would be a source of crime stating that "unprotected hiker-biker trails evolve into mugger-thugger trails" and that it would bring "unbridled bandits" to the area. Meyer argued that the deed granting the right-of-way to the railroad included a stipulation that it would revert to the Meyers if the tracks went unused, the county believed that it held a "good deed" to the land and in May 2001, they sued Meyer as the first step in the condemnation process. The county was trying to resolve the issue prior to a June 20, 2001 deadline for nearly $1 million in state funding. Despite thinking they had bought the railroad, the county withdrew the lawsuit in late June 2001 after a letter writing campaign by other hunters. County officials decided to find an alternate route to the Patuxent.

The first section of the trail, in Prince George's County, a 5.6-mile (9.0 km) long stretch from MD 450 in Glenn Dale to Race Track Road in Bowie, opened on November 8, 2000. This section was extended 1100 feet northeast from Race Track Road to the Patuxent River in 2005. Once it became clear that the bridge across the Patuxent River would not be located at the point where the old railroad bridge had been, PG County built a 1.3 mile trail spur to the point where the bridge would be built and a little beyond it where it will one day connect with Phase 9 of the Bowie Heritage Trail. This WB&A Trail Spur opened in early 2016.

Construction of the Anne Arundel portion of the trail started in 2003 with four phases, later expanded to five. Phase I started with a 2.3-mile (3.7 km) long section, in Anne Arundel County through Odenton which opened in 2004, linking Waugh Chapel Road to Strawberry Lake Way, both located in Piney Orchard. Phase Ib extended the trail another two miles (3 km) northeast in 2006 to connect Waugh Chapel Road to Odenton Road. Phase II extended the trail 1.3 miles from Strawberry Lake Way to Conway Road and opened in November 2007. It incorporated two bridges, including one passing over the Little Patuxent River. Part of Phase IV, which is not built on the rail right-of-way but as a sidepath along Strawberry Lake Way, was completed by June 2008, the rest to Annapolis Road will be constructed in the future. Phase III extended the trail 1.7 miles south from Conway Road to the shores of the Patuxent River. Construction was completed in 2016, and the extension opened on June 2 of that year. Anne Arundel County built a bridge across the Patuxent from 2022 to 2025.

Meanwhile, the Odenton Bike path, which will partially connect the WB&A Trail to the South Shore Trail, opened in 2003.

== Future ==
Phase IVb of the trail will build a 2.06 mile spur north from the intersection of Strawberry Lake Way and Waugh Chapel Road, through the Odenton Natural Area and then across the school grounds of Arundel High School and Middle School to Phase II of the South Shore Trail. Planning for that phase was completed in March 2024, but there is no schedule for construction.

In addition to the WB&A Trail, the South Shore Trail, built along right of way of the old Annapolis and Elk Ridge Railroad which for a while was owned by the WB&A, will eventually connect the trail to Annapolis; and the Bowie Heritage Trail will connect it to Bowie State University and the Bowie MARC station.

An extension of the trail north along the old WB&A right-of-way, paralleling the existing road, all the way to the BWI Trail, was included in the 1995 West County Trail Master Plan and the 2002 Severn Small Area Plan, but not in the 2013 Anne Arundel County Bicycle and Pedestrian Master Plan. In the fall of 2019, the county began a two-year feasibility study of what they called the BWI to Odenton Trail. A shorter extension north to Annapolis Road is also in the original plans for the trail, but with no timeline as of 2025.

An extension of the trail south to the Marvin Gaye Park Trail in Washington, DC, along Maryland Route 704, is in both the Prince George's County 2009 and 2016 Bicycle Master Plan. A feasibility study of this extension was conducted in 2018.
