= Woodwardville, Maryland =

Unincorporated community in Maryland, United States

- Unincorporated community
- Location within the state of Maryland
- Coordinates: 39°4′17″N 76°41′59″W
- Country: United States
- State: Maryland
- County: Anne Arundel
- Elevation: 157 ft (48 m)
- Time zone: UTC-5 (Eastern (EST))
  - Summer (DST): UTC-4 (EDT)
- ZIP code: 21113
- Area code: 410

Woodwardville is an unincorporated community situated in western Anne Arundel County, Maryland, United States, containing 27 structures, 16 of which are historic and included in the Woodwardville Historic District, listed on the National Register of Historic Places in 2003. Most of the structures are located adjacent to Patuxent Road, which runs through the center of the community. On the north end of the district, a small street, 5th Avenue, runs west from Patuxent Road underneath the train tracks. Prior to the establishment of what would be later known as Fort George G. Meade in 1917, the road once continued on to Laurel. Three of the seven buildings along 5th Avenue are historic. Woodwardville's building stock consists principally of late-19th and early-20th century domestic architecture. Good examples of the Bungalow, Foursquare, Tudor Revival, and Queen Anne styles are present, as well as older traditional vernacular classifications such as the I-house. These older forms are supplemented by a handful of post-World War II era structures. Woodwardville also features several public or commercial buildings including a church, a former schoolhouse, the ruins of a store and storage or service buildings associated with the railroad. Many of Woodwardville's older buildings fell into decline following World War II, but in recent years, due to its close proximity to commuter rail service, Woodwardville has evolved into a bedroom community for persons working in Washington and Baltimore. Investment by new residents resulted in the restoration and renovation of many buildings which had formerly been in deteriorating condition. Despite the intense development a mile away in Piney Orchard, this quaint community retains its ability to communicate its historic qualities and distinct sense of place.

== History ==
Woodwardville's development is directly related to the construction of the Baltimore & Potomac Railroad, initiated in 1867 and completed in 1872. This line later became part of the Pennsylvania Railroad system, and is now operated by Amtrak. A station, known as Patuxent, was established in 1872 and three years later, the name of Woodwardville was given to the emerging village when a post office opened in the Abram G. Woodward General Store. Woodward, a descendant of the prominent Woodward family in Maryland, served as a tobacco inspector in 1866–1867, a property assessor in 1876, and a census enumerator in 1880. He served as postmaster from 1875 until his death in 1906.

Later the Riden Family bought large amounts of land in Woodwardville, from the Woodward family. Several homes in the town were built They family also donated to land for the Trinity Church and cemetery. Some of this family still remains in the Town of Woodwardville, at the original property.

The village grew along Patuxent Road, paralleling the railroad and centered on the station, store, and Methodist Church. By 1878, the population of Woodwardville had grown to 50. The Maryland Directory of that year lists a machinist, shoemaker, blacksmith, wheelwright, miller, attorney, and physician in the town, in addition to A. G. Woodward as postmaster and seller of general merchandise. In 1879, Public School #8 was built near Patuxent Station, with William T. Anderson serving as the first schoolteacher. Although in ruinous condition, the school structure still survives on the east side of Patuxent Road.

In 1882, Trinity Methodist Episcopal Church South was dedicated. Today known as the Trinity United Methodist Church, it remains the centerpiece of the village. The general store, which does not survive, due to arson vandalism, was located on the west side of the road, just south of where 5th Avenue runs under the railroad track. The empty structure of the A.D. Riden Hardware Store and Office, a molded concrete block building built in the 1920s, still remains at the northern end of town. A.D Riden Hardware Store was a family Run business. Trains would drop lumber and things of that sort on their way to the next station, right in Woodwardville.

The construction of Fort George G. Meade in 1917, west of Odenton, involved the usurping of farmland owned by many of the residents of Woodwardville. Furthermore, the siting of Fort Meade closed off the area between Woodwardville and Laurel, prompting the Pennsylvania Railroad to eventually close Patuxent Station. In 1927, the Woodwardville Post Office closed, after which the town became known as Patuxent. During the 1980s, at the behest of local residents, the town was renamed Woodwardville.

From the 1920s to the 1950s, the Salvation Army maintained a fresh air summer camp near Woodwardville for low income women and children who lived in Washington. The camp, named Happyland, was located north of the Little Patuxent River on the west side of Patuxent Road between the road and the Pennsylvania Railroad tracks (now Amtrak). There were numerous permanent wooden buildings, including dormitories, cottages, a recreation hall, cafeteria, and kitchen.

Residents of Washington's poorest areas escaped crowded conditions and sweltering heat and enjoyed a wooded area beside the Little Patuxent River, nourishing food, and exercise. Among the many recreational opportunities were a swimming pool, playground, baseball field, volleyball court, and "various drills and games." In the late 1920s, groups of 75 to 90 girls and boys and their mothers arrived by train and enjoyed a free, 10-day vacation. Salvation Army workers tried to accommodate five shifts of this size during July and August. The Salvation Army hoped that these measures would "send them back rebuilt in body and spirit and much more able to face the problems which confront them for the balance of the summer."

During the Depression, charitable donations to support the camp were fewer. Happyland did not open in 1933, but it reopened the following year. By the late 1930s, only children came to Happyland. Groups of 100 boys and girls arrived in buses and stayed one month.

After World War II, the Salvation Army operated two fresh air camps in the Washington area. A new Camp Happyland in rural Virginia operated for the benefit of white children. The property at Woodwardville, renamed Camp Patuxent, served African-American children. In 1952, the two camps were integrated at the Virginia location.

The architectural character of Woodwardville's surviving buildings, its setting, and physical arrangement evoke a palpable image of late-19th century rural villages that once were typical on the Anne Arundel County landscape. Of these, Woodwardville, Davidsonville, and Owensville are the only three surviving crossroads communities in the county that still retain a significant degree of architectural and historical integrity.
