= Woodwardville Historic District =

Historic district in Maryland, United States

- U.S. National Register of Historic Places
- U.S. Historic district
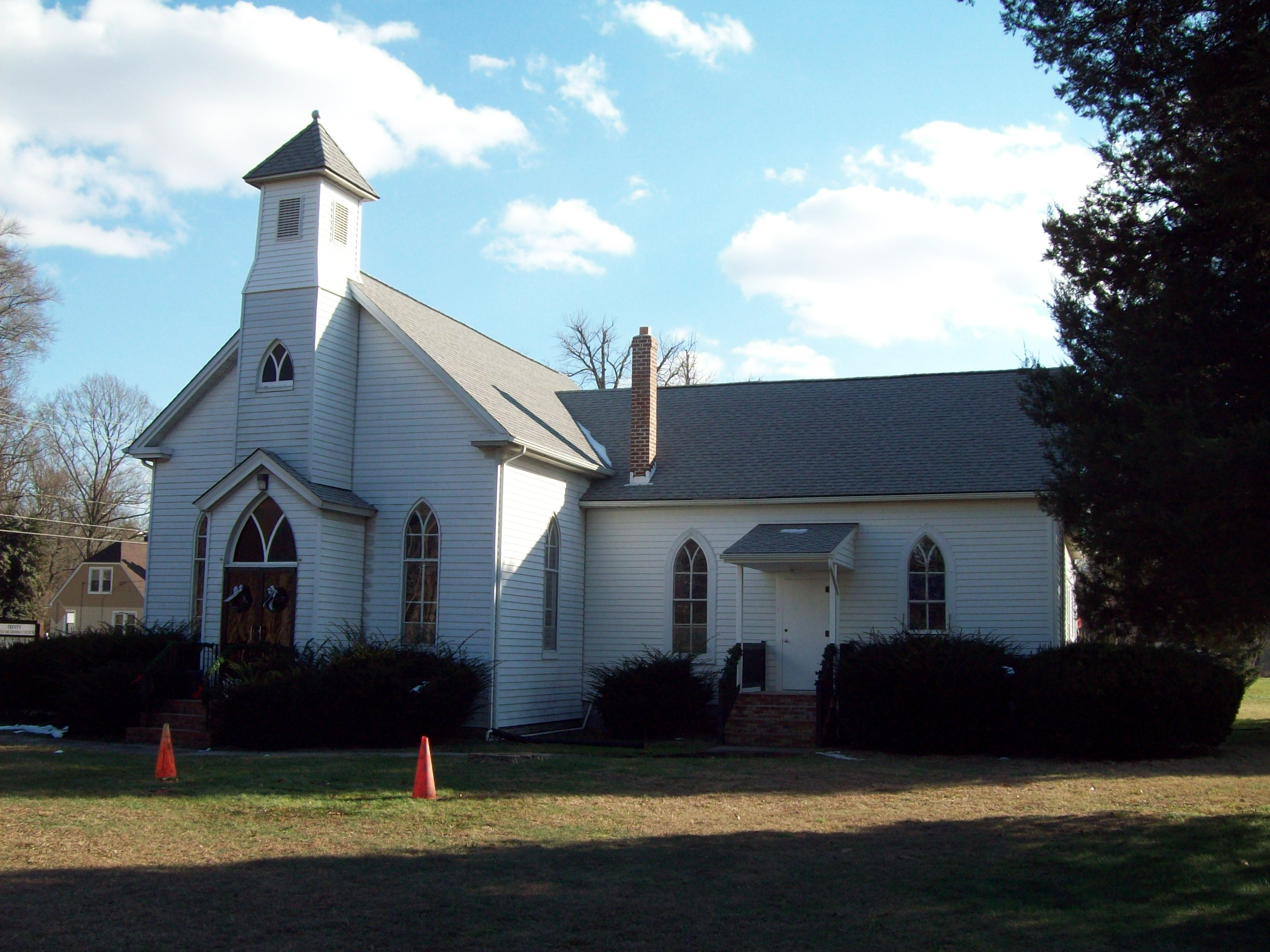
- Methodist Church at Woodwardville Historic District, December 2009

- Location within Maryland Location within the United States
- Nearest city: Woodwardville, Maryland
- Coordinates: 39°3′7″N 76°44′8″W
- Area: 77.6 acres (31.4 ha)
- Built: 1872
- Architectural style: Queen Anne, Tudor Revival, et al.
- NRHP reference No.: 03001115
- Added to NRHP: November 08, 2003

Woodwardville Historic District is a national historic district at Woodwardville, Anne Arundel County, Maryland. The district consists of 16 historic structures, most of which are located adjacent to Patuxent Road, which runs through the center of the village of Woodwardville. The district contains good examples of late-19th and early-20th century domestic architecture, including Bungalow, Foursquare, Tudor Revival, and Queen Anne styles. The village's development was directly related to the construction of the Baltimore & Potomac Railroad, initiated in 1867 and completed in 1872.

It was listed on the National Register of Historic Places in 2003.
