= South Shore Trail =

Trail in Maryland, United States

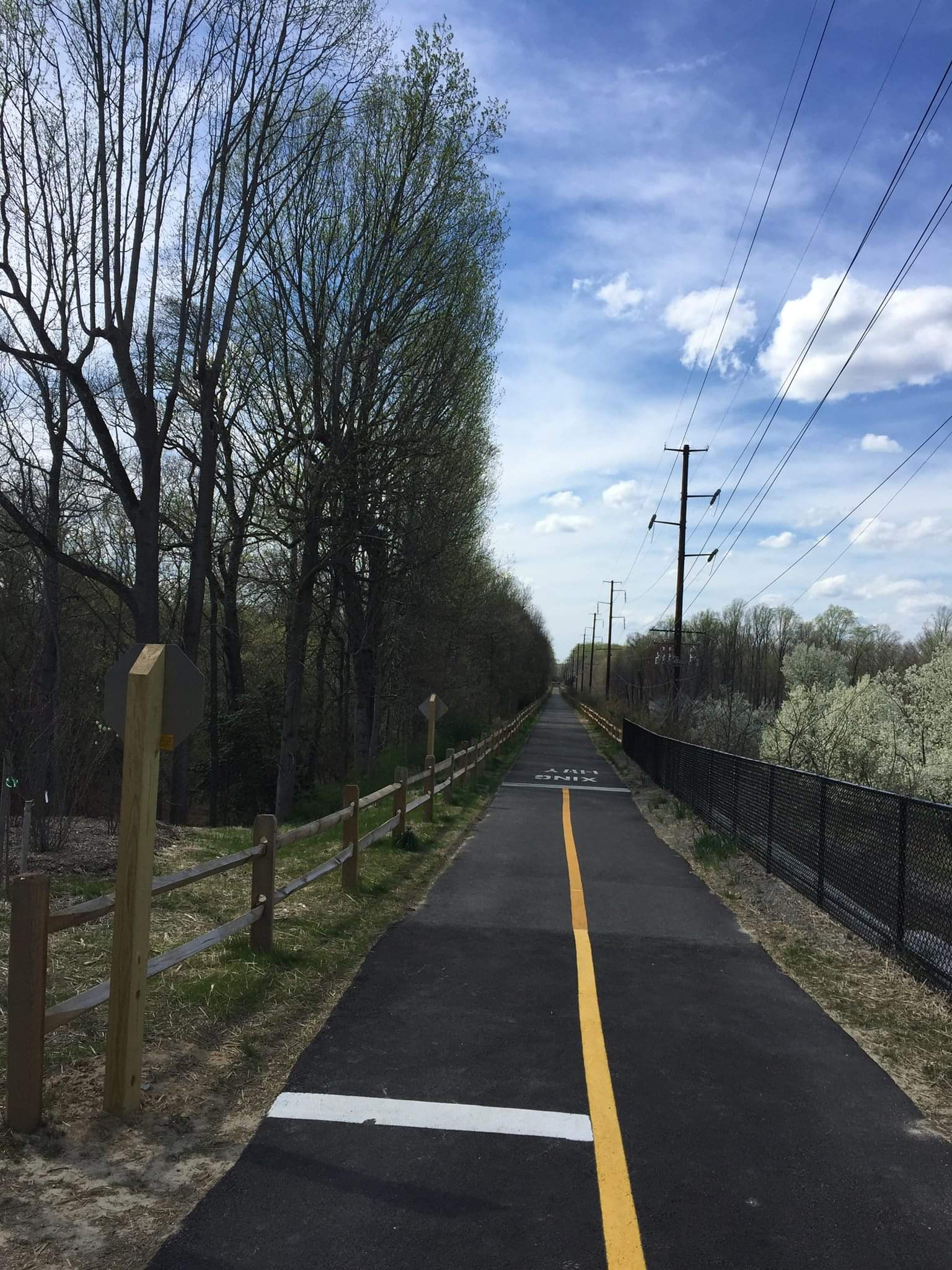
- The South Shore Trail between Crownsville and Millersville
- Length: 2.96 miles (4.76 km)
- Location: Anne Arundel County
- Designation: East Coast Greenway, American Discovery Trail, September 11th National Memorial Trail
- Trailheads: Jennifer Road, Bestgate Road, Waterbury Road and Hansel Drive
- Use: Hiking, Biking, Running, Rollerblading
- Surface: Asphalt
- Website: www.aacounty.org/locations/south-shore-trail

The South Shore Trail is a 11.2-mile (18.0 km) long, planned shared-use rail trail that will run from Annapolis to Odenton in Maryland, United States. Two segments, totaling 2.96-mile (4.76 km) have been built. The Trail primarily utilizes the abandoned road bed of the Annapolis and Elk Ridge Railroad. The trail will connect with the Colonial Annapolis Maritime Trail on the east and the Washington, Baltimore and Annapolis Trail, via the Odenton Bike Path, on the west. When complete, it will be a component of the American Discovery Trail, the East Coast Greenway and the September 11th National Memorial Trail. The trail name is a reference to the railroad it replaces which during its last 10 years in operation was known as the South Shore Division because it ran along the south shore of the Severn River.

== History ==
The Annapolis and Elk Ridge Railroad was chartered in 1837 and began operating in 1840. Competition and fees forced it into bankruptcy and reorganization in the 1880s and it changed its name to the Annapolis, Washington & Baltimore Railroad. In 1902 it was purchased by the Washington, Baltimore and Annapolis Electric Railway (WB&A) and transformed into an electric interurban line. In 1921, when the WB&A purchased the B&A, the line became known as the South Shore Division of the WB&A and the B&A as the North Shore Division based on their relationship to the Severn River. In 1935, the entire WB&A ceased operations and the section between Odenton and Annapolis was sold for scrap.

In the late 1980s, Maryland turned the southern portion of the B&A railroad into a rail trail and by 1986, the success from that led Anne Arundel County to declare intentions to do the same for the South Shore line, which they hoped to have open by 2000. As Part of state highway project, a bike lane along route 50 and the Severn River Bridge, connected the trail to Annapolis. On November 9, 1990 county leaders broke ground on a half-mile section of the trail between Waterbury Road and I-97 in Millersville, but work did not commence.

For nearly 30 years, the trail languished, delayed by environmental concerns, local opposition and budget constraints. First the trail was delayed by the reluctance of owners to sell the rail bed, which by then had passed back into the hands of residents, to the county for a trail. Then money became an issue when, in 1992 limited by a cap on tax revenue, the County Council voted to pull $270,000 from the trail project to repair the Lake Waterford dam in Pasadena. Though they planned to restore the funding in 1994 and 1995 public opposition became an issue. In 1994, with formal plans still five years away, the county considered allocating $660,000 for planning and land acquisition; but local residents began to express cost concerns and fear of crime related to a connection to Millersville Elementary. At the same time, the project managers had to petition the Army Corps of Engineers for permission to use a portion of the rail bed that passed through what had since become wetlands. In 2001 the trail, this time the planned section along General's Highway, was facing public opposition because it would run through some people's front yards. In 2008, the County voted to redirect Program Open Space funding intended for the trail and other park projects towards the installation of artificial turf fields at county high school stadiums, further delaying the project.

The county also struggled with land acquisition and ownership issues. It first claimed it had purchased all the land it needed in late 1999, but for years thereafter it was still trying to prove that it owned every parcel it claimed it did and it continued to make purchases for more than a decade. In 2000, the County had to buy a historic, two-story house on 2.9 acres along Cecil Avenue in Millersville to become the trail's headquarters because it was the only way to get a piece of property it needed. In 2013, the state paid $138,853 to acquire two parcels of land totaling 0.8 acres in Millersville.

Despite this, the project continued to attract attention as a key connection. In 1991, the American Hiking Society and Backpacker magazine created a plan for the cross-country American Discovery Trail between Delaware and California and the South Shore Trail was designated a future portion of it. By 1998, it had been identified as part of the future East Coast Greenway.

Work on segments of the South Shore Trail finally began in 2002 as part of other larger projects. That year, in construction related to the Nordstrom Wing of the Westfield Annapolis Mall, the County built 750 feet of trail between the Anne Arundel Medical Center and Jennifer Road. The following year, work was completed on the Odenton Bike Path which will serve as the connection between the South Shore Trail and the WB&A Trail. In 2006 a section of the Annapolis Maritime Trail was constructed along Solomons Island Road from the South Shore Trail's Jennifer Road trailhead to Somerville Road; and later that same year, 2,500 feet of trail was built from the north end of the existing section to Bestgate Road at Commerce Park Drive.

Meanwhile, the main portion of the trail along the railroad route suffered continued delays. Though the trail got $800,000 in the 2005 federal highway bill, there was no construction. In 2010 trail designers decided to reroute the trail in the Millersville area because they were concerned that paving over portions of nontidal wetlands would prove to be too expensive and that the permitting process would take too long. This redesign resulted in another delay in the slow-moving project. In the summer of 2012, the county spent more than $200,000 to buy land along the new planned route. At the time, the start of construction, which had been promised many times in the prior 22 years, was scheduled for July 1, 2013. However, it wasn't until 2015 that the state provided the $990,000 needed to design and construct the first phase between Hansel Drive and Waterbury Road.

In 2017, the logjam broke. Construction of Phase I of the trail, the section from Hansel Drive to Waterbury Road, for which ground was originally broken in 1990, officially began in October 2017 In 2018, County Executive Steve Schuh announced a $9.4 million plan to complete the South Shore Trail to Odenton. The money would be used to acquire still more property, complete detailed designs and construct the paved multi-use trail.

By that time, construction had been broken into five phases:

- Phase I (Waterbury to Maryland Route 3, currently open)
- Phase II (MD 3 to Odenton, utilizing the railroad bed and includes crossing of MD 3)
- Phase III (Bestgate Road to Eisenhower Golf Course, along southern end of Generals Highway)
- Phase IV (Eisenhower Golf Course to Waterbury Road, along northern end of Generals Highway and includes crossing of Interstate 97)
- Phase V (Bestgate Road to City of Annapolis, currently open. Plans exist to expand this phase to connecting the South Shore Trail and the Poplar Trail.)

By this time, Phase V was complete and Phase I was underway. Phase I was completed in 2019 with a ribbon cutting on May 13, 2019.

== Description ==
The trail currently exists in two sections: one in Parole, Maryland between Bestgate Road and Jennifer Road, and another between Hansel Drive in Millersville, Maryland and Waterbury Road in Crownsville, Maryland. In total, the two sections are 2.96 miles (4.76 km) in length. County plans call for the sections to be connected and extended to the Odenton Bike Path.

On the east end the trail begins at the end of the Annapolis Maritime Trail at the corner of Jennifer Road and Medical Parkway. It travels along Medical Parkway to the north side of the Westgate area where it turns east and then north to connect to Bestgate Road, covering about 3000 feet of distance and ending about 1500 feet from the old rail bed.

A gap then exists from there to the start of the other section, about 6 miles away, at Waterbury Road, just west of that road's bridge over Interstate 97. Built atop the railroad bed, that section extends more than 1.5 miles (2.4 km) to a point just east of Crain Highway. A 2.3 mile long gap then separates that section from the east end of the Odenton Bike Path at the roundabout between Annapolis Road, Odenton Road, Sappington Station Road, and Higgins Drive; the existing trail in Odenton continues west to meet the WB&A Trail's current northern terminus.

== See also ==
- Washington, Baltimore and Annapolis Trail
- Baltimore and Annapolis Trail
