= Piney Orchard, Maryland =

Unincorporated community in Maryland, U.S.

Coordinates: 39°03′59″N 76°42′51″W

Piney Orchard is an unincorporated community within the Washington DC suburb of Odenton, Maryland, United States. Piney Orchard began as a Planned Unit Development, and was a project of the Constellation Real Estate Group, Inc., a wholly owned subsidiary of the Constellation Energy Group, which itself, is now owned by Exelon.

Construction of the community began in 1991, although groundbreaking for what was to become the Nature Preserve started in 1987, when Constellation Real Estate Group began the effort to restore wetlands in an area which had been mined for sand and gravel in the 1940s and 1950s. Several mitigation projects, the term used for this restoration, followed in five phases to replace wetlands filled in by the development of the community, and included the building and enhancement of five large ponds and the planting of shrubs, trees, and grasses native to the area. The Army Corps of Engineers, which oversees such efforts, monitored the progress of the mitigation sites until 1995, when it was determined the efforts had been successful. In 1996, the Piney Orchard Nature Preserve was officially opened.

More than 3500 housing units have been built in Piney Orchard and approximately 8500 residents live there. Constellation turned over the day-to-day supervision of Piney Orchard to the homeowners of the community in 2005. The Piney Orchard Community Association, or "POCA" as it is known, arranges several community-wide social activities and collects annual fees from all homeowners to maintain the aesthetic qualities of the community.

Piney Orchard Ice Arena, located at the corner of Piney Orchard Parkway and Riverscape Drive, had been the practice site for the Washington Capitals hockey team until 2006, when they moved to their newly built practice facility, Kettler Capitals Iceplex in Arlington, Virginia.

== Education ==
Piney Orchard is served by Anne Arundel County Public Schools (AACPS). The city's zoned public elementary school is Piney Orchard Elementary School, located at 2641 Strawberry Lake Way, Odenton, MD 21113.

Piney Orchard Elementary School is a public school that opened in October, 2000. Serving grades K–5 and is one of 89 elementary schools within Anne Arundel County Public Schools. It has approximately 955 students with a student to teacher ratio of 15 to 1.

The school consistently ranks in the top 30% of Maryland elementary schools. In the 2023–2024 school year, 72.5% of students were proficient or better in English Language Arts. Above both the county average of 53.9% and the statewide average of 48.4%. In Mathematics, the school posted a 39.8% proficiency rate, compared to 27.6% countywide and 24.1% statewide.

The school offers a Gifted & Talented program. It has also earned recognition as a Maryland Green School, received the EGATE award for excellence in gifted and talented education, and holds the AACPS Wellness School of Distinction Award.

Students typically promote to Arundel Middle School and then Arundel High School once completing the 5th grade.

== Sub-divisions within Piney Orchard ==
- Autumn Crest
- Brookwood
- Burgundy Place
- Cedar Ridge - Active Adult Community
- Chapel Village
- Chestnut Gable
- Chestnut Point
- The Courts
- Emory Woods
- Fieldstone Farms Apartments
- Francis Station
- The Gatherings at Forest Glen - Active Adult Community
- The Groves
- Harvest Run
- Maple Ridge
- Nature's Trail
- Piney Station
- River Colony
- River's Edge
- River Run
- Riverscape Apartments
- Settler's View
- Station House
- Stone Crossing
- Streamview
- Summer's Run
- Summit Chase
- The Vineyards
- Westcourts
- Woodland Walk
