= LocalLink 33 (BaltimoreLink) =

Bus route in Baltimore, Maryland and its suburbs

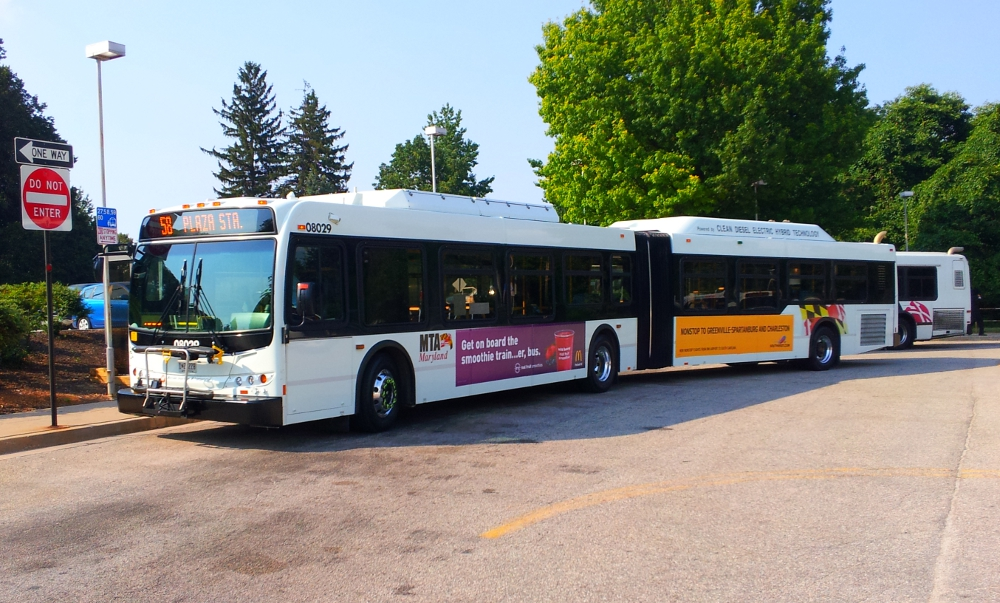

Overview
- System: Maryland Transit Administration
- Garage: Northwest
- Status: active
- Began service: 2008
- Predecessors: Route M-10 (west side), Routes 15 and 66 (east side)

Route
- Locale: Baltimore City; Baltimore County
- Communities served: Fallstaff; Glen; Cheswolde; Ranchleigh
- Landmarks served: Reisterstown Road Plaza; White Marsh Mall
- Other routes: 3, 8, 11, 12, 15, 18, 19, 27, 35, qb47, qb48, 53, 54, 55, 59, 60, 61, 104, 120

Service
- Level: Daily
- Frequency: Every 60 minutes Every 30 minutes (peak)
- Weekend frequency: Every 60 minutes
- Operates: 5:10 am to 11:30 pm

LocalLink 33, formerly Route 58 is a bus route operated by the Maryland Transit Administration in Baltimore and its suburbs. The line's western terminus is the Reisterstown Plaza Metro Subway Station, and its eastern terminus is White Marsh Mall, though some peak hour trips make short turns in Overlea. Route 58 serves the communities of Glen, Cheswolde, Fallstaff, a large section of Northern Parkway, and a portion of Belair Road in Baltimore County.

The western portion of this route is based on that of the former Route M-10, and is identical to most of the route that Route M-10 followed since 1992, and exactly like that which has been followed since 2005, with the exception of Greenspring Station service, which is now provided by Route 60. The eastern half of this route is based on that of the now defunct Route 66, which was discontinued in 1993.

== History ==
The Greenspring Avenue corridor and the Cheswolde area was first served by the no. 47 streetcar prior to 1950. The no. 47 streetcar operated from Mt. Washington along Kelly Avenue, long before there was a light rail stop in the area. The line was originally constructed with the intention of being part of the Emory Grove Streetcar Line, but it was never completed to this extent, and later abandoned.

=== Route 58 designation ===
The current Routes 58 and 60 replaced Route M-10 on August 24, 2008. But the no. 58 designation was previously used for several other bus lines that served many common areas. Between 1984 and 2008, the no. 58 designation was not used at all, and these areas were served by various Metro connection buses.

The original Route 58, which started operating in 1948, operated from Brighton to Greenspring Manor (near Cheswolde). It was merged as a branch of Route 44 in 1973, known as the "Brighton" branch. The Brighton branch of Route 44 operated until 2005, when as part of the Greater Baltimore Bus Initiative, it was discontinued, and riders were directed to use Route M-10, which operated nearby.

Another line numbered 58 started operating later in 1973 from Pimlico to Ranchleigh, but in 1975, this became a branch of Route 5.

There was also a Route 58A that operated from 1973 to 1975 from the Reisterstown Road Plaza to Greenwood via Villa Julie College. This service was later merged into Route 5 as a special branch, which operated until 1984, when Metro connection services took over. From 1987 to 2005, a line known as Route M-12 covered this route, serving Greenwood, Villa Julie, Stevenson, and Caves Road. This line, which underperformed and faced numerous cutbacks over its years of operation, was eliminated in 2005 as part of the Greater Baltimore Bus Initiative. MTA stated that the line was requiring a taxpayer subsidy of $9.41 per rider. Following public opposition, Route M-10 was extended from Greenspring Station to Villa Julie, and this area is currently covered by Route 60. This was after the portion of Route M-10 along Falls Road was also proposed for elimination.

Another line known as Route 58 operated from the Reisterstown Road Plaza to Mt. Washington from 1976 to 1978, but was discontinued.

=== 1984-1992 ===
In 1984, in conjunction with the opening of the Baltimore Metro Subway, two new routes were formed, Routes P-7 and R-2. Route P-7 operated between the Reisterstown Plaza Station and Ranchleigh, serving Fallstaff. Route R-2 operated between the Rogers Avenue Station and Mt. Washington serving Cheswolde.

In 1987, in conjunction with the opening of Phase II of the Metro, Routes P-7 and R-2 were redesignated Routes M-10 and M-5, respectively. Route M-5 briefly had service to Towson State University via the Ruxton area, but this was later discontinued.

=== 1992-2008 ===
In 1992, in conjunction with the opening of the Light Rail, Routes M-5 and M-10 were combined into a single line, which was given the M-10 designation. The new Route M-10 served both the Reisterstown Plaza and Rogers Avenue Metro stations, the Mt. Washington and Falls Road Light Rail Stops, and all points served by both of the previous routes, with the exception of short blocks on a few streets. Additionally, Saturday service was discontinued.

In 1998, Saturday service was added back to Route M-10, and a branch that operated twice daily via Old Court Road was discontinued. Sunday service was added for the first time ever in 2001.

In 2005, as part of the Greater Baltimore Bus Initiative, service via Old Pimlico Road was discontinued, and all trips were modified to operate to Mt. Washington via Smith Avenue, with all weekday trips continuing to Greenspring Station, and all peak hour trips continuing to Villa Julie College, replacing a portion of Route M-12, which was discontinued. The line was also shortened to Reisterstown Plaza Metro Station. The original plan had been to completely eliminate Route M-10 service on Falls Road, and operate Route M-10 via the present route of Route 58.

=== 2008-present ===
On August 24, 2008, Route M-10 was split into Routes 58 and 60. Route 58 operated along the same routing as before from the Reisterstown Plaza station to the intersection of Smith and Greenspring, then via Greenspring to the new Quarry Lake development. Route 60 was formed to operate along the full length of Clarks Lane without any deviations, and to serve all points of Route M-10 east of Greenspring.

In February 2009, Route 58 was modified to serve Mt. Washington following complaints from Quarry Lake residents over the buses.

On July 3, 2011, an extension of service to White Marsh Mall on Route 58 replaced the Route 15's service to White Marsh, allowing easier access there from the north. The extension travels via Falls Road, Northern Parkway, Belair Road, and White Marsh Boulevard. Service operates hourly, except during weekday peak periods where every other trip operates between the Reisterstown Plaza Metro Station and Overlea.

In 2017, as a part of the BaltimoreLink system redesign, Route 58 became LocalLink 33.
