= LocalLink 92 (BaltimoreLink) =

Bus route operated by the Maryland Transit Administration

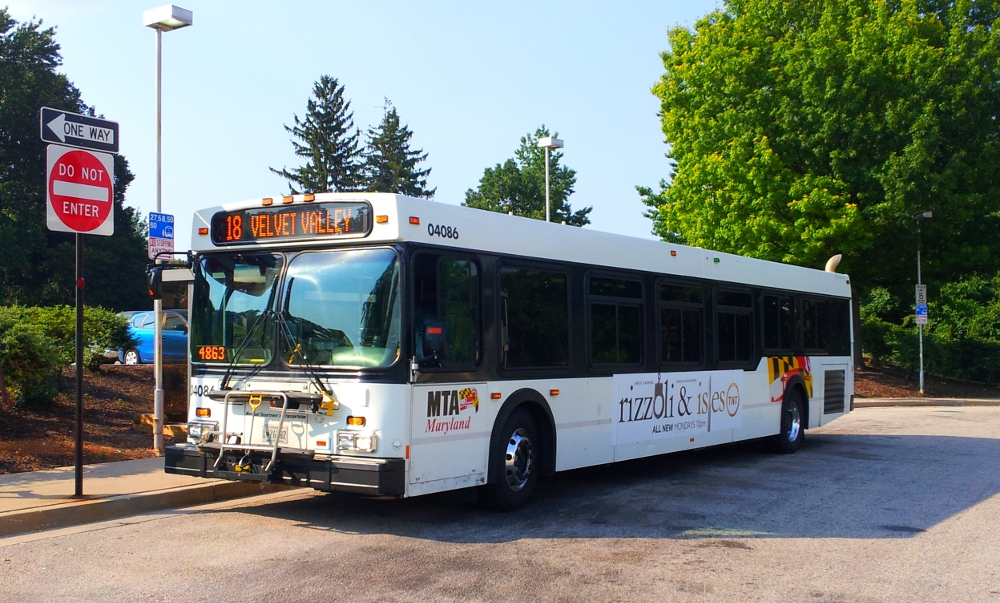
- Route 18 Velvet Valley bus at the Reisterstown Plaza Station

Overview
- System: Maryland Transit Administration
- Garage: Northwest
- Status: active
- Began service: 2010
- Predecessors: Route 18

Route
- Locale: Baltimore City; Baltimore County
- Communities served: Glen; Cross Country; Cheswolde; Ranchleigh; Pikesville
- Other routes: 54, 58, 59, 60, 77, 99

Service
- Level: School days only
- Frequency: Every 30 minutes Every 20 minutes (peak)
- Weekend frequency: Every 30-90 minutes
- Operates: 7:00 am to 8:00 pm SCHOOL DAYS ONLY

LocalLink 92 is a school-day only bus route operated by the Maryland Transit Administration in Baltimore. The line currently runs from Glen Avenue and Key Avenue in Northwest Baltimore to Smith Avenue and Copper Ridge Road in Mount Washington or Old Court Road and Scotts Hill Drive in Pikesville.

The purpose of the line is to provide transportation for the students of Bais Yaakov and Talmudical Academy of Baltimore. Bais Yaakov has two campuses: one on Park Heights Avenue in Owings Mills, and one on Smith Avenue in Copper Ridge. Talmudical Academy is located on Old Court Road in Scotts Hills, between the Metro Station and the overpass over the beltway.

== History ==
The no. 18 service officially began in 2010 for the 2010-11 school year, but MTA had a long history of providing buses for the students of Bais Yaakov and Talmudical Academy.

In the late 1980s, MTA started providing supplemental bus service to Bais Yaakov School for Girls in Owings Mills. These buses ran during school hours at the times of need for students. On weekdays, buses were identified as M-3, and on Sundays as 5. There was no service on Saturdays. Buses going to Bais Yaakov in the morning said "Velvet Ridge," and buses coming back in the afternoon said "Fallstaff Road" or "Northern Parkway." Buses to Fallstaff Road went to Smith and Sanzo along Park Heights Avenue, Northern Parkway, Pimlico Road, Kenoak Road, Greenspring Avenue, Cross Country Boulevard, Taney Road, Greenspring Avenue, Willowglen Drive, Fallstaff Road, Clarks Lane, and Sanzo Road. Others terminated at Park Heights Avenue and Northern Parkway.

In the mid 1990s, Bais Yaakov opened a second campus on Smith Avenue in Mt. Washington. Buses operating in the reverse direction were initiated to serve this location.

In the 2000s, MTA started to provide buses for Talmudical Academy of Baltimore. These buses ran using the M-10 designation and a route similar to the current no. 18. The buses did not drop students off on Old Court Road across from the school. They went around the block on Scotts Level Road for safety so students could be dropped off on the side of the road the school is on.

The no. 18 designation was also used for several routes in the Baltimore area in the past. It was first used for a streetcar that operated along Pennsylvania Avenue and to Canton from 1984 to 1952 along a route similar to that of today's Bus Route 7. This streetcar was converted to a bus that carried the no. 18 designation from 1952 to 1952 until it was combined with the Reisterstown Road Bus, then designated Route 7. The no. 18 designation was not used again until 1973 until it was given to an express bus service that operated from Cockeysville, Timonium, and Hereford to Downtown Baltimore during rush hour. This route operated until May 1992, when it was converted to a shuttle between Timonium station and Hunt Valley Mall that operated until January 1993, when it was absorbed by Bus Route 9.

The most recent route to use the no. 18 designation prior to the current one was a shuttle service that operated between the Cromwell light rail stop and Old Mill from 1993 to 1996, when it was discontinued.

In 2017, Route 92 replaced Route 18 in its entirety under BaltimoreLink.

== Controversies ==
There have been various controversies regarding bus services provided for students of these schools.

When service began for girls of Bais Yaakov, there had been reported incidents of child predators approaching girls waiting at bus stops, though no girls were harmed. There was also concern regarding the safety of girls who had to walk several blocks to or from their bus stops, which at some times of the year, would be in the dark. This was resolved by increased police and civilian patrols to the areas frequented by the girls.

There was also concern when service was initiated for the students of Talmudical Academy that boys and girls may be waiting at the bus stops at the same time. While there is no actual prohibition in the Jewish religion against this, the local rabbinical authorities did not feel comfortable with having boys and girls mingle at the bus stops. This was resolved by having buses run at different times for boys and girls, sometimes more than an hour apart.

== See also ==
- Route 58 (local all day service)
- Route 60 (local all day service)
