= List of Baltimore Light RailLink stations =

The Baltimore Light RailLink network consists of a main north-south line that serves 28 of the system's 33 stops; a spur in Baltimore city that connects a single stop (Penn Station) to the main line; and two branches at the south end of the line that serve two stops apiece. Because of the track arrangement, trains can enter the Penn Station spur only from the mainline heading north and leave it heading south; there are still single-track sections north of Fairgrounds, limiting headways in that section to 15 minutes.

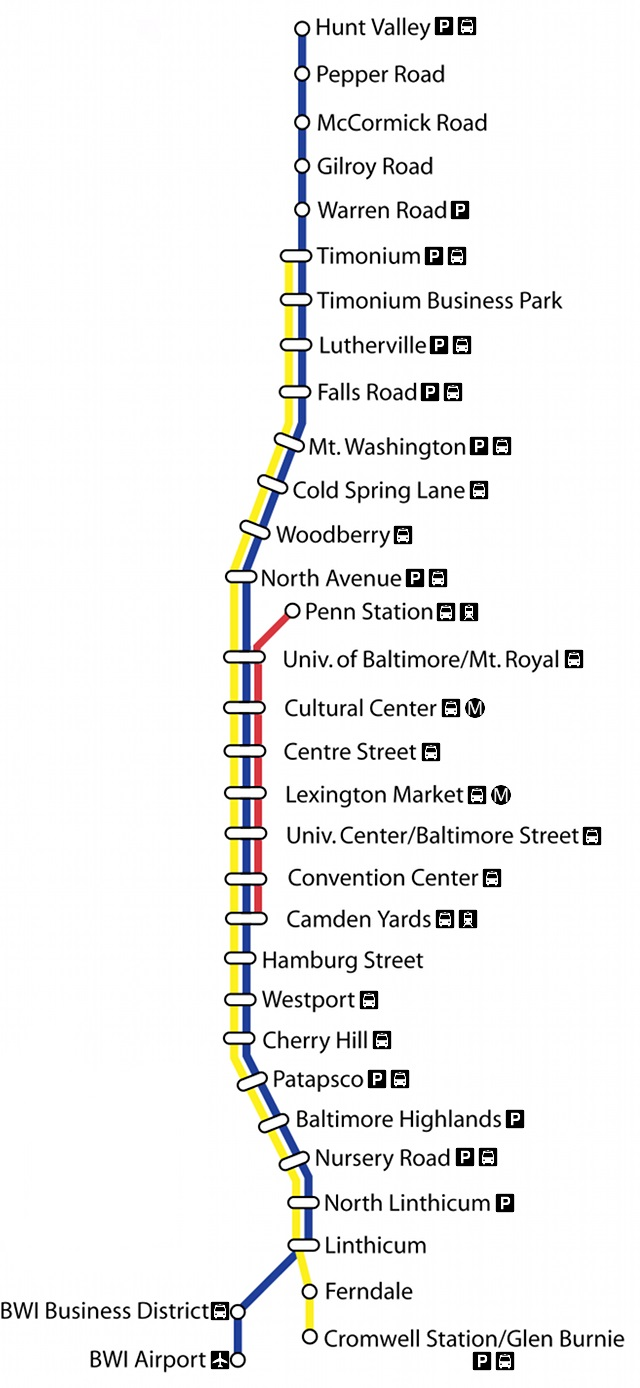
Baltimore Light RailLink network map

== Main Line ==
Station	Location	Parking spaces	Routes	Connections	Ridership (FY 2017)	Points of interest
Hunt Valley	Shawan at Hunt Valley Towne Centre; Hunt Valley	85	Hunt Valley–BWI; Hunt Valley–Glen Burnie	Rabbit Transit: 83S	728	
Pepper Road	Pepper & Schilling; Hunt Valley	none	Hunt Valley–BWI; Hunt Valley–Glen Burnie		158	
McCormick Road	Schilling Cir. & McCormick; Hunt Valley	none	Hunt Valley–BWI; Hunt Valley–Glen Burnie	LocalLink: 93; Rabbit Transit: 83S	434	
Gilroy Road	Gilroy & Beaver Dam; Hunt Valley	none	Hunt Valley–BWI; Hunt Valley–Glen Burnie		223	
Warren Road	Warren & Beaver Dam; Cockeysville	370	Hunt Valley–BWI; Hunt Valley–Glen Burnie	LocalLink: 93; Rabbit Transit: 83S	276	
Fairgrounds	Deereco between Timonium & Padonia; Timonium	851	Hunt Valley–BWI; Hunt Valley–Glen Burnie	LocalLink: 93; Rabbit Transit: 83S	No Data	Maryland State Fairgrounds
Timonium	Aylesbury & Business Park Dr. Timonium	none	Hunt Valley–BWI; Hunt Valley–Glen Burnie		960	
Lutherville	West end of Ridgely Road; Lutherville	286	Hunt Valley–BWI; Hunt Valley–Glen Burnie	CityLink: RD; LocalLink: 93	790	
Falls Road	Falls & Lake Roland Park entrance Towson	110	Hunt Valley–BWI; Hunt Valley–Glen Burnie	LocalLink: 34	412	
Mt. Washington	Smith Ave. & Newberry; Baltimore	75	Hunt Valley–BWI; Hunt Valley–Glen Burnie	LocalLink: 33, 34, 94	421	
Cold Spring Lane	Cold Spring Lane & I-83; Baltimore	none	Hunt Valley–BWI; Hunt Valley–Glen Burnie	LocalLink: 28, 38	588	
Woodberry	Clipper & Union Ave. Baltimore	none	Hunt Valley–BWI; Hunt Valley–Glen Burnie	LocalLink: 21, 22	384	
North Avenue	North Avenue & I-83; Baltimore	37	Hunt Valley–BWI; Hunt Valley–Glen Burnie	CityLink: GD; LocalLink: 85	932	
Mt. Royal/MICA	Mt. Royal Ave. & Dolphin; Baltimore	none	Hunt Valley–BWI; Hunt Valley–Glen Burnie; Penn–Camden	LocalLink: 94	703	University of Baltimore; MICA
Cultural Center	Howard & Preston; Baltimore	none	Hunt Valley–BWI; Hunt Valley–Glen Burnie; Penn–Camden	SubwayLink (at Cultural Center); CityLink: YW LM; LocalLink: 53, 54, 73, 94; Express BusLink: 154; MTA Commuter Bus: 410	731	Meyerhoff Symphony Hall
Mt. Vernon	Howard & Centre; Baltimore	none	Hunt Valley–BWI; Hunt Valley–Glen Burnie; Penn–Camden	CityLink: PK; LocalLink: 54, 94; Express BusLink: 120, 154	452	
Lexington Market	Howard & Lexington; Baltimore	none	Hunt Valley–BWI; Hunt Valley–Glen Burnie; Penn–Camden	SubwayLink (at Lexington Market); CityLink: BL; QuickLink: 40; LocalLink: 54, 71, 73, 80, 94; Express BusLink: 105, 115, 120, 150, 154, 163; MTA Commuter Bus: 320	3047	
Baltimore Arena	Howard & Baltimore; Baltimore	none	Hunt Valley–BWI; Hunt Valley–Glen Burnie; Penn–Camden	CityLink: RD OR PR; QuickLink: 40; LocalLink: 54, 65, 71, 78, 94; Express BusLink: 105, 120, 150, 154, 160, 163; MTA Commuter Bus: 210, 215, 310, 320, 420	2211	
Convention Center	Howard & Pratt; Baltimore	none	Hunt Valley–BWI; Hunt Valley–Glen Burnie; Penn–Camden	CityLink: BR NV YW; LocalLink: 54, 76, 94; Express BusLink: 120, 154, 160, 163; MTA Commuter Bus: 320, 410, 411, 420; Charm City Circulator: Orange	1009	
Camden Yards	Howard & Conway; Baltimore	none	Hunt Valley–BWI; Hunt Valley–Glen Burnie; Penn–Camden	MARC: Camden Line	616	Camden Yards
Stadium/Federal Hill	Eutaw & Hamburg; Baltimore	none	Hunt Valley–BWI; Hunt Valley–Glen Burnie		235	M&T Bank Stadium
Westport	Cedley & Kent; Baltimore	none	Hunt Valley–BWI; Hunt Valley–Glen Burnie	LocalLink: 26, 69, 70, 73	604	
Cherry Hill	Cherry Hill Rd. Baltimore	none	Hunt Valley–BWI; Hunt Valley–Glen Burnie	LocalLink: 26, 71; Charm City Circulator: Cherry	663	
Patapsco	Baltimore & Patapsco Ave. Halethorpe	216	Hunt Valley–BWI; Hunt Valley–Glen Burnie	CityLink: YW; LocalLink: 26, 29, 32, 69, 70, 71, 73, 75	1192	
Baltimore Highlands	Baltimore & Georgia Ave. Halethorpe	50	Hunt Valley–BWI; Hunt Valley–Glen Burnie	none	269	
Nursery Road	MD 648 & Nursery; Pumphrey	37	Hunt Valley–BWI; Hunt Valley–Glen Burnie	LocalLink: 75	427	
North Linthicum	Camp Meade & Koch; Linthicum Heights	347	Hunt Valley–BWI; Hunt Valley–Glen Burnie	none	579	
Linthicum	Camp Meade & Benton; Linthicum Heights	none	Hunt Valley–BWI; Hunt Valley–Glen Burnie	none	443	

== Branch to BWI Airport ==
Station	Location	Parking spaces	Route	Connection	Ridership (FY 2017)
BWI Business District	Aviation Blvd. & Elkridge Landing; Linthicum Heights	36	Hunt Valley–BWI	LocalLink: 75	204
BWI Airport	BWI Airport Concourse E Anne Arundel County	Pay-to-Park	Hunt Valley–BWI	LocalLink: 75; MTA Commuter Bus: 201; Shuttle to BWI Rail Station	994

== Branch to Glen Burnie ==
Station	Location	Parking spaces	Line	Connections	Ridership (FY 2017)	Landmark
Ferndale	MD 648 & Ferndale; Glen Burnie	none	Hunt Valley–Glen Burnie	Anne Arundel County: AA-BP	93 (least used)	
Glen Burnie	MD 648 & Dorsey; Glen Burnie	795	Hunt Valley–Glen Burnie	LocalLink: 69, 70; MTA Commuter Bus: 215; Anne Arundel County: AA-201, AA-BP, AA-GD	1078	Baltimore & Annapolis Trail northern terminus

== Penn Station line ==
Station	Location	Line	Parking spaces	Connection	Ridership (FY 2017)
Penn Station	Charles & St. Paul; Baltimore	Penn–Camden	Pay only	Amtrak; MARC: Penn Line; CityLink: GR SV; LocalLink: 51, 95; Express BusLink: 103; Charm City Circulator: Purple	285
