= Sabina Mattfeldt, Baltimore =

Sabina Mattfeldt
- neighborhood statistical area
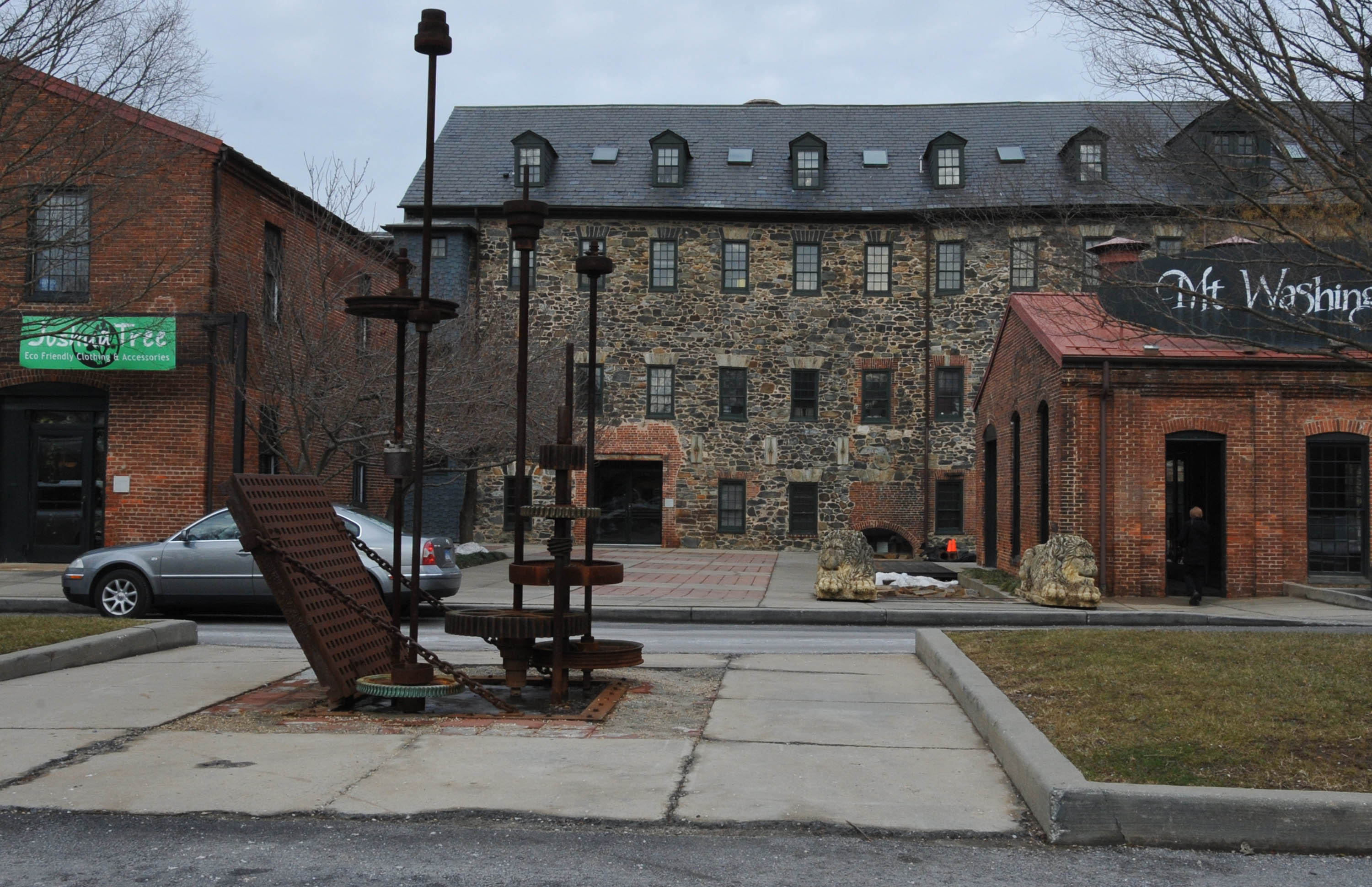
- Mount Washington Historical District in Sabina Mattfeldt

- Location within Baltimore
- Coordinates: 39°21′52″N 76°38′55″W
- Country: United States
- State: Maryland
- City: Baltimore

Area
  - Total: 0.165 sq mi (0.43 km^{2})
  - Land: 0.165 sq mi (0.43 km^{2})

Population (2009)
  - Total: 204
  - Density: 1,240/sq mi (477/km^{2})
- Time zone: UTC-5 (Eastern)
  - Summer (DST): UTC-4 (EDT)
- ZIP code: 21209
- Area code: 410, 443, and 667

Sabina Mattfeldt is a neighborhood in the North District of Baltimore, located beside the Jones Falls, between the neighborhoods of Mount Washington (west) and Poplar Hill (east). Its name comes from the two streets, Sabina Avenue and Mattfeldt Avenue, where most of the neighborhood's homes are located.

Falls Road and Jones Falls Expressway mark the neighborhood's east and west boundaries. The back yards of homes on the north side of Appleby Avenue touch the community's north boundary at the Baltimore County line. Its southern limit is Northern Parkway.

== History ==
Most of the homes in this tiny, secluded community are two-story, wood-frame houses built by Charles Mattfeldt from 1886 to the mid-1890s. Mattfeldt rented the houses to employees of the mills located along the Jones Falls. A portion of the neighborhood was razed by the City of Baltimore after several houses on Mattfeldt Avenue were flooded by Hurricane Agnes in 1972. The empty lots became the neighborhood's two open areas.

As the mills along the Jones Falls closed in the late 20th century, Sabina Mattfeldt transformed from a neighborhood of factory workers into a community of artists and musicians. Its residents have maintained and restored much of the original architecture in their homes, which still have round-top attic windows.

== Significant landmarks ==
Most of the residential properties in the community are located in the southern half of the neighborhood on Mattfeldt Avenue. Meadowbrook Aquatic & Fitness Center is located between these homes and Kelly Avenue, opposite the post office on Cottonworth Avenue. Build in 1930 by George Morris, Meadowbrook Aquatic serves as a venue for the North Baltimore Aquatic Club and was the home training facility for Olympic swimmer Michael Phelps.

Whole Foods Market operates a grocery store to the north of Kelly Avenue on Smith Avenue.

Asbury Park fills the area between Whole Foods Market and the houses on Appleby Avenue.

== Public transportation ==
The LocalLink 94 (BaltimoreLink) bus crosses through the northern end of the neighborhood on Kelly Avenue, then travels along Falls Road on its way to Downtown Baltimore. After crossing the Jones Falls Expressway on Kelly Avenue, it stops at the Mount Washington Light Rail Stop and continues to the Rogers Avenue Metro station.

LocalLink 34 (BaltimoreLink) also passes through the neighborhood on Kelly Avenue as it travels between the Reisterstown Road Plaza Metro station and Brooklandville, Maryland.

LocalLink 30 (BaltimoreLink) provides crosstown bus service on Northern Parkway, along the community's southern edge.

== See also ==
List of Baltimore neighborhoods
