= Mount Washington, Baltimore =

- Mount Washington Mill Historic District
- U.S. National Register of Historic Places
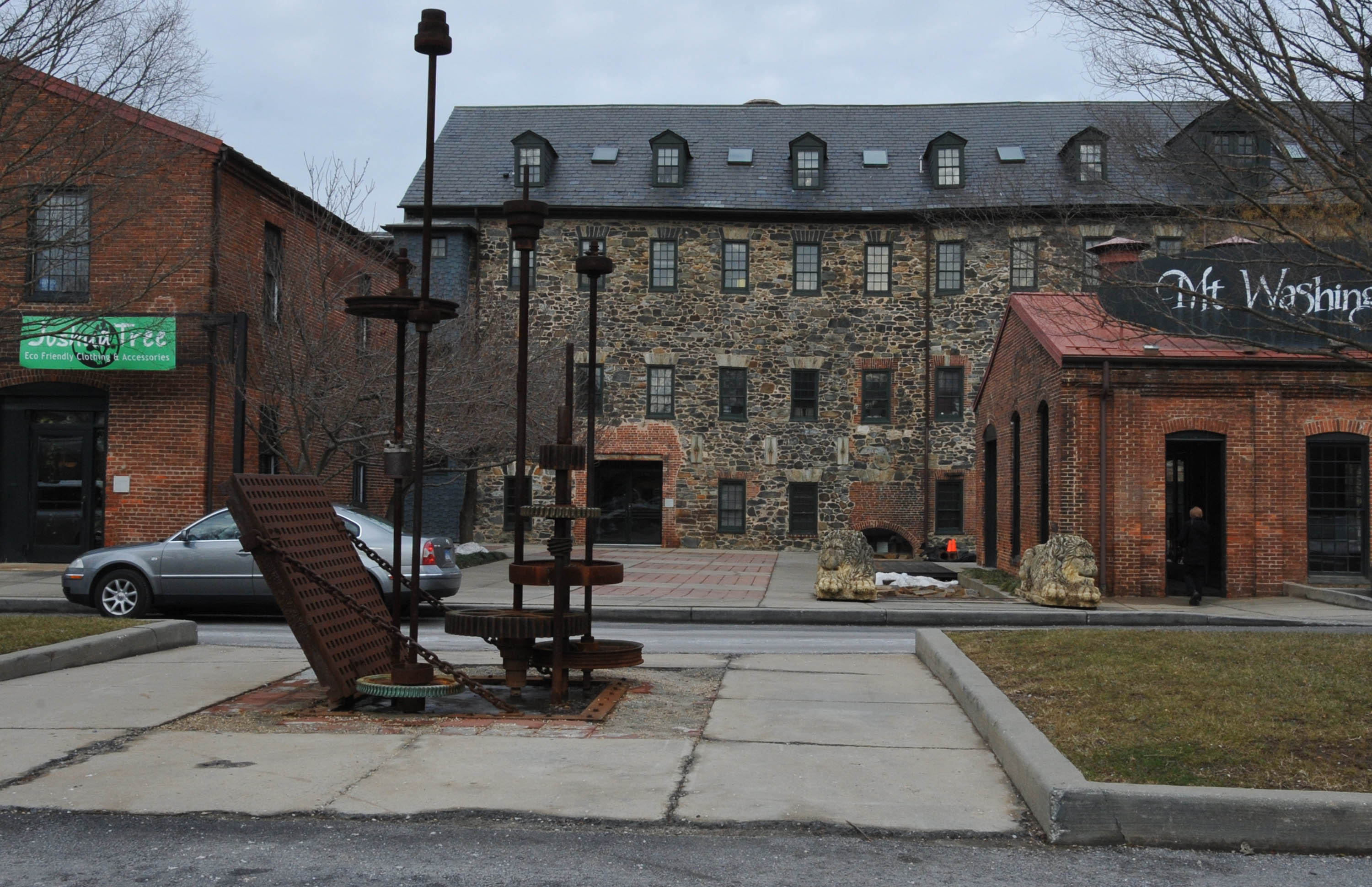

- Location within Baltimore Location within Maryland Location within the United States
- Location: 1330--1340 Smith Avenue and 1405-1407 Forge Ave., Baltimore, Maryland
- Coordinates: 39°22′6″N 76°38′59″W
- Area: 4.8 acres (1.9 ha)
- NRHP reference No.: 90000727, 01001376
- Added to NRHP: May 4, 1990, December 28, 2001 (Boundary Increase)

Mount Washington is an area of northwest Baltimore, Maryland. It is a designated city historic district and divided into two sections: South Road/Sulgrave to the southeast and Dixon's Hill (or Dixon Hill) to the north. The Mount Washington Historic District was listed on the National Register of Historic Places in 1990 with a boundary increase in 2001, with five contributing buildings and four contributing structures.

== Description ==
Historically, Mount Washington was a small area. However, residents and businesses of many other nearby neighborhoods in the 21209 ZIP code and a small portion of the 21215 ZIP code (west of Pimlico Road) around the neighborhood refer to their location as Mount Washington. Though mostly within the Baltimore city limits, but mixed with some of these areas within Baltimore County as Pikesville.

The Mount Washington neighborhood is served by the Mount Washington Improvement Association, which, though not speaking on behalf of all the neighborhood's residents, wields significant political clout in Baltimore.

Mount Washington is mostly residential, though it has two small commercial areas:

- Mount Washington Village, off the west side of the Jones Falls Expressway near the Kelly Avenue bridge, containing several restaurants and stores, as well as the Baltimore Light Rail's Mount Washington Station.
- Mount Washington Mill, a refurbished textile mill now housing stores, shops and offices, off the east side of the Jones Falls Expressway near the Kelly Avenue bridge, commonly referred to as Historic Mount Washington.

These two areas were at one time viewed as a single area, but since the construction of Interstate 83 these areas have been separated, and travel over a longer distance is required between them.

== History ==
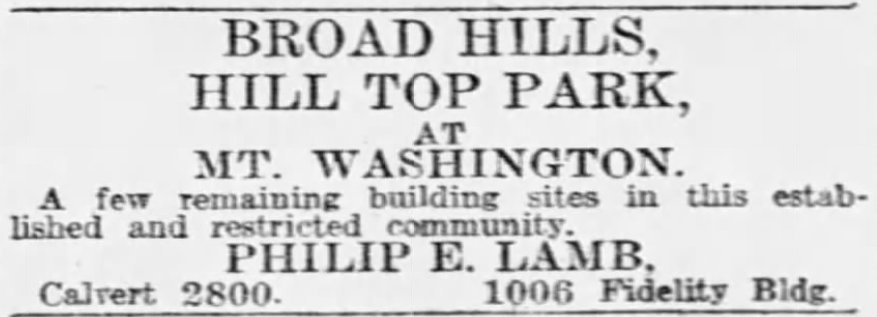
A 1921 Baltimore Sun advertisement for racially restricted houses sold in Mount Washington by Philip E. Lamb.

In 1854, George Gelbach and Elias Heiner purchased 314 acres near Washingtonville, a mill village. Though the original homes were designed as summer houses, Gelbach envisioned that Mount Washington would eventually become a suburb of Baltimore. Building picked up after the Civil War, with developers, such as John Graham (a resident of Mount Washington) developing small groups of houses around the South Road section. The northern section of the area, what became Dixon's Hill, was the result of Thomas Dixon purchasing 20 acres from Gelbach in 1855 and developed in the 1860s. Mount Washington is considered by some to be Baltimore's first suburb. It was part of Baltimore County until it was annexed in 1914.

Prior to the passage of the Fair Housing Act of 1968, racially restrictive covenants were used in Baltimore to exclude African-Americans and other minorities. A 1921 advertisement in the Baltimore Sun described Mount Washington as a racially "restricted community".

== Major roads in Mount Washington ==
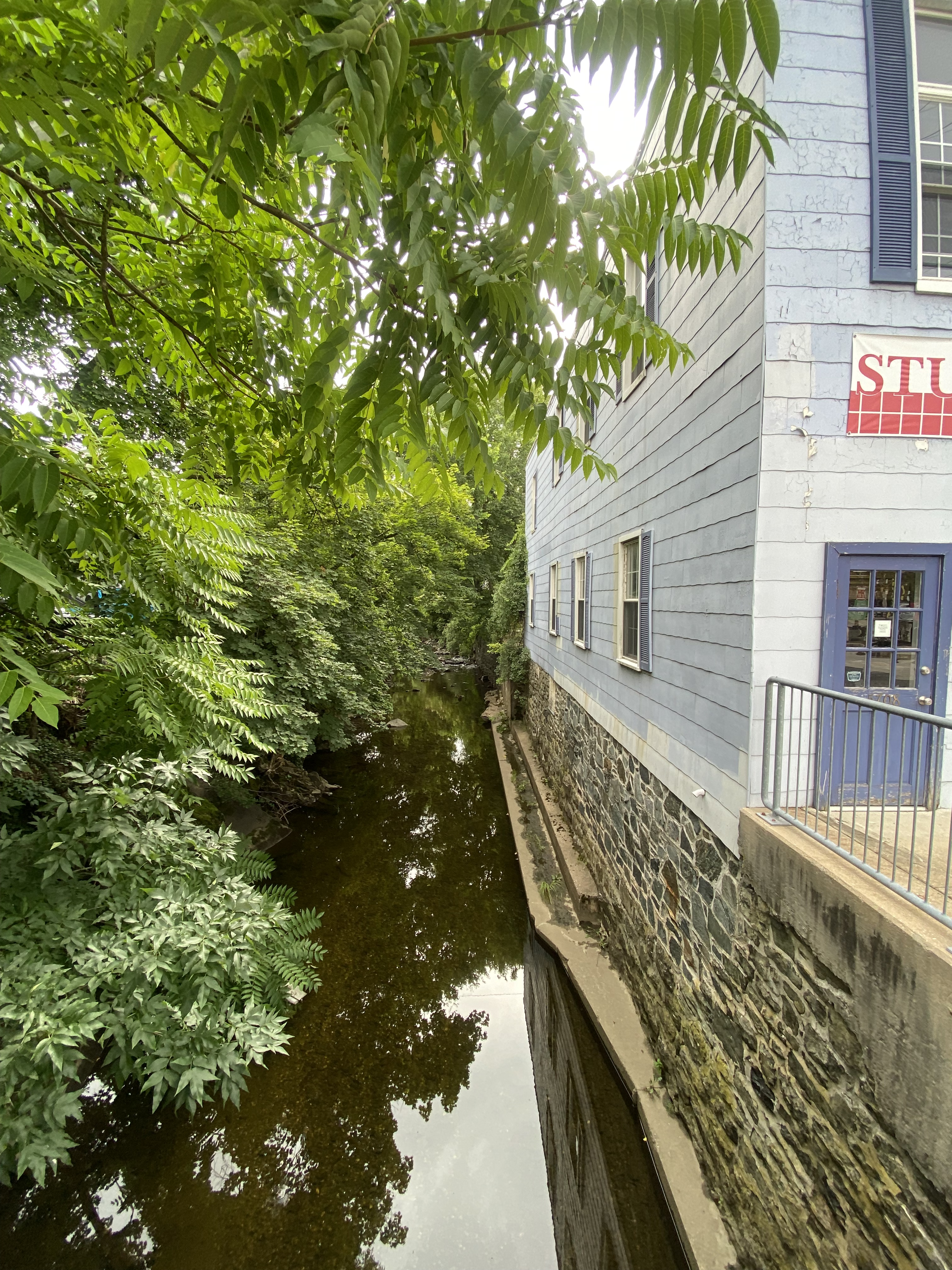
Western Run in Mount Washington

Sulgrave street Mount Washington, Baltimore in 2026

Some of the main roads that run through the Mount Washington area are:

Immediate:

- Interstate 83, also known as the Jones Falls Expressway (JFX)
- Falls Road
- Kelly Avenue
- Greely Road
- Smith Avenue

Extended:

- Greenspring Avenue
- Cross Country Boulevard
- Pimlico Road
- Northern Parkway
- Lake Avenue

Other communities near Mount Washington include:

- Village of Cross Keys (south)
- Cheswolde (west)
- Pimlico (west)
- Rodgers Forge (east)
- Ruxton (north)

== Public transportation ==
Mount Washington is well known for its public transportation operated by the Maryland Transit Administration. This, most notably, includes the Central Light Rail line. It has a stop in historic Mount Washington Village. Light Rail service operates to downtown Baltimore, Hunt Valley, and BWI Airport every 10–15 minutes at most times.

MTA also operates three public bus lines in Mount Washington Village, all of which originate at the Reisterstown Plaza Metro Subway Station. These are: Route 27, which operates to areas including Hampden, Downtown Baltimore, and the Cherry Hill area, Route 58, which terminates at a loop in Mt. Washington after serving the Fallstaff area, and Route 60, which also serves Fallstaff and continues north to Greenspring Station and Stevenson University.

== Schools ==
The zoned local public schools are The Mount Washington School and Northwestern High School, although most of the children in the community who pursue their education in the Baltimore City public school system do so at either of the magnet schools, City or Poly. Most of the upper-middle-class families send their children to some of the many private schools in the area.

== Athletics ==
The neighborhood has been the home of the Mount Washington Lacrosse Club since its establishment in 1904. Mount Washington dominated the sport at the club and collegiate level for much of the 20th century. Since 1999, Mount Washington has shared its home field, Norris Field on Kelly Avenue, with the all-girls Bryn Mawr School. Mount Washington is also home of Meadowbrook Swim Club, established in 1930, which has hosted many famous swimmers in the 1930s and 1940s and is now a venue rented by of the most prestigious swimming clubs in the world, the North Baltimore Aquatic Club or NBAC for short. The NBAC is a team of many Olympic swimmers including Michael Phelps, Chase Kalisz, Katie Hoff, Patrick Kennedy, Theresa Andrews, Anita Nall, Beth Botsford, Whitney Metzler, and Allison Schmitt. NBAC is also home to Paralympians Ian Silverman, Jessica Long and Becca Meyers.

== Notable residents and natives ==
- Elizabeth Turner Graham (1837-1920), Civil War relief activist, women's movement organizer, philanthropist
- Charles L. Bennett, astrophysicist
- Duke Cameron, heart surgeon
- Katie Hoff, Olympic swimmer
- Doug Turnbull (1903–1906), National Lacrosse Hall of Fame inductee
