= Quarry Lake (Maryland) =

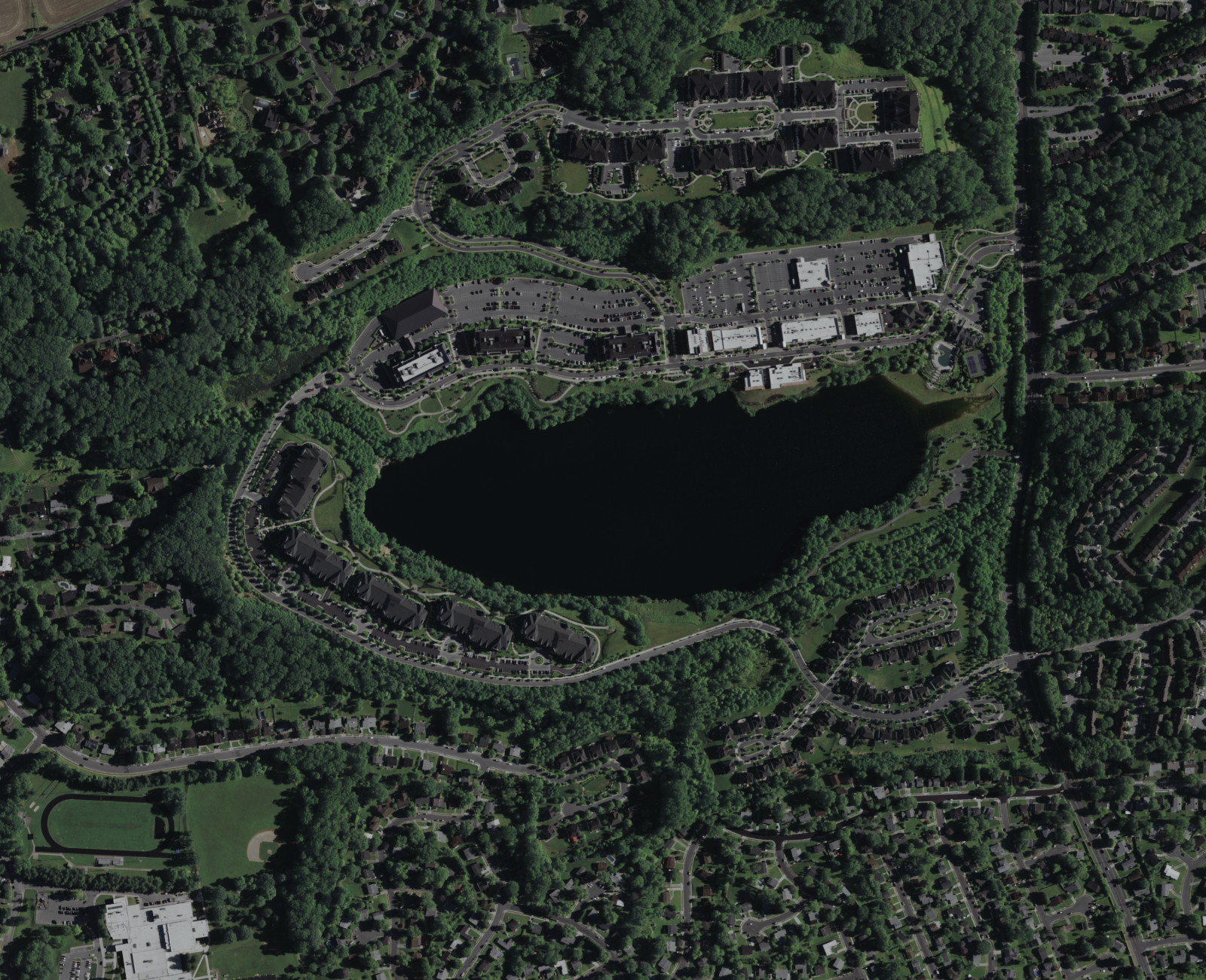
- Quarry Lake in 2017

- Location within Maryland Location within the United States
- Location: Pikesville, Maryland
- Coordinates: 39°22′57″N 76°41′28″W
- Type: Reservoir
- Surface area: 40-acre (160,000 m^{2})
- Max. depth: 150 metres (490 ft)

Quarry Lake is a manmade lake in the Pikesville area of Baltimore County, Maryland. Originally a marble quarry, it is now one of the deepest lakes in the state. The lake is surrounded by Quarry Lake at Greenspring, a mixed residential development and commercial development that includes single-family homes, condominiums, shops, and office buildings.

== History ==
The lake itself is a flooded quarry that dates back to 1877. It is located off Greenspring Avenue, between Old Court Road and Smith Avenue. The quarry was likely originally run by the Boyle family, and later transferred to the McMahon family. The McMahon Quarry was purchased by the Arundel Corporation in 1937, and became known as the Greenspring Quarry. The quarry operated to produce crushed stone from a gneissic phase of the Cockeysville Marble, though other minerals were also found at the site. The Arundel Corporation of Baltimore survives as a subsidiary of Vulcan Materials Company.

In 1999, an agreement was reached to allow a new mixed-use development to be constructed on the property. Construction began in 2005, and the first businesses opened starting in 2006, which now include medical office space of LifeBridge Health, Walgreens, and The Fresh Market. The development also features 83 single-family homes and 500 condos.

The center of the development features is 40-acre (160,000 m^{2}) lake, which is 500 feet (150 m) deep, one of the deepest lakes in the state of Maryland.

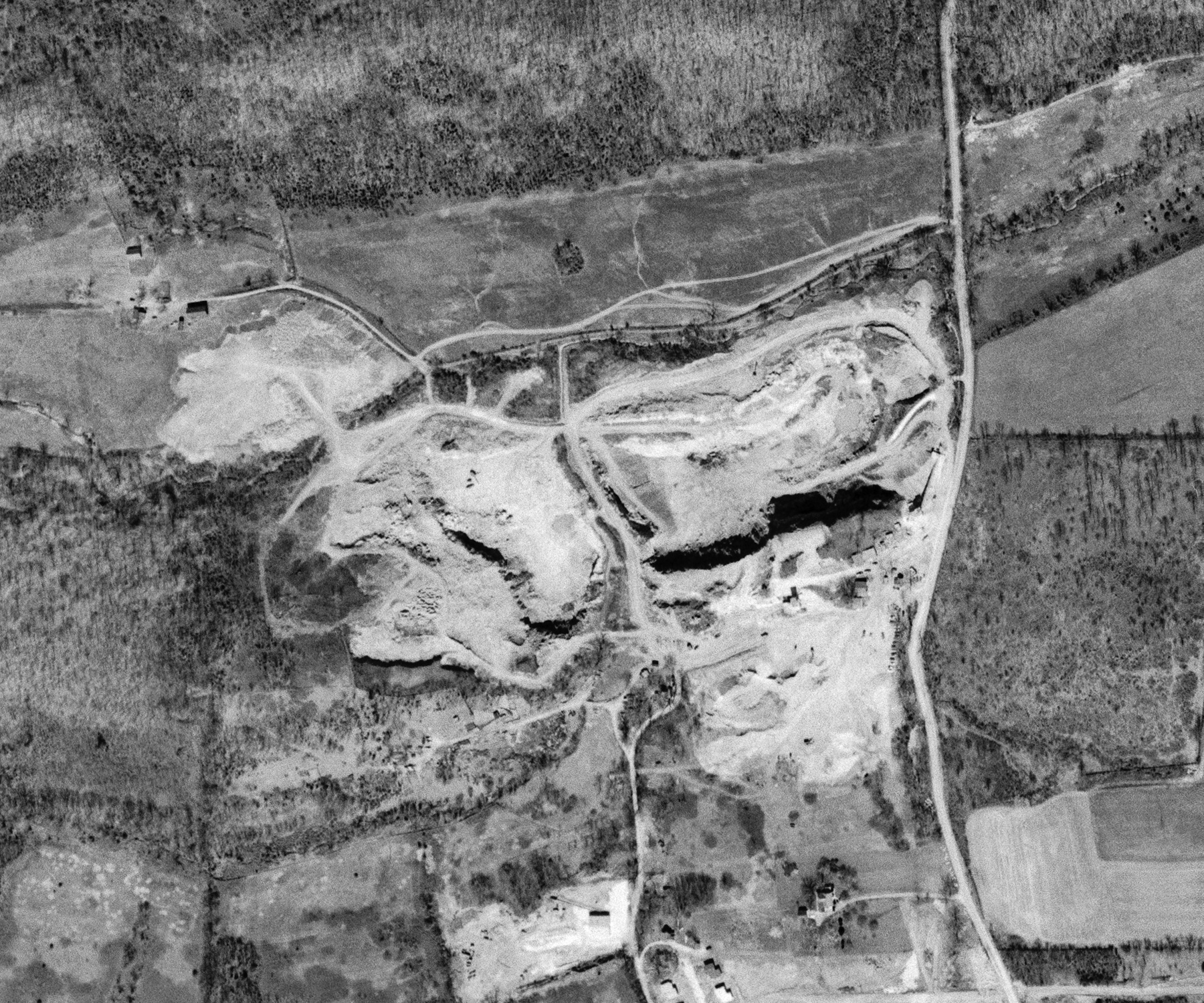
The quarry in 1956

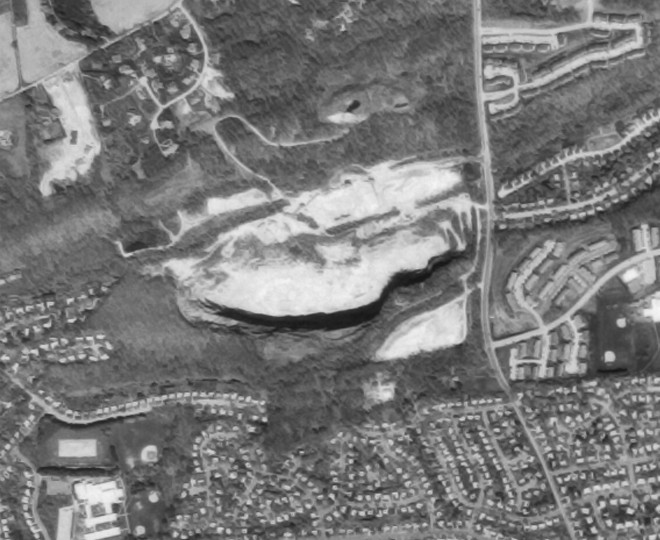
The quarry in 1998, a few years before flooding

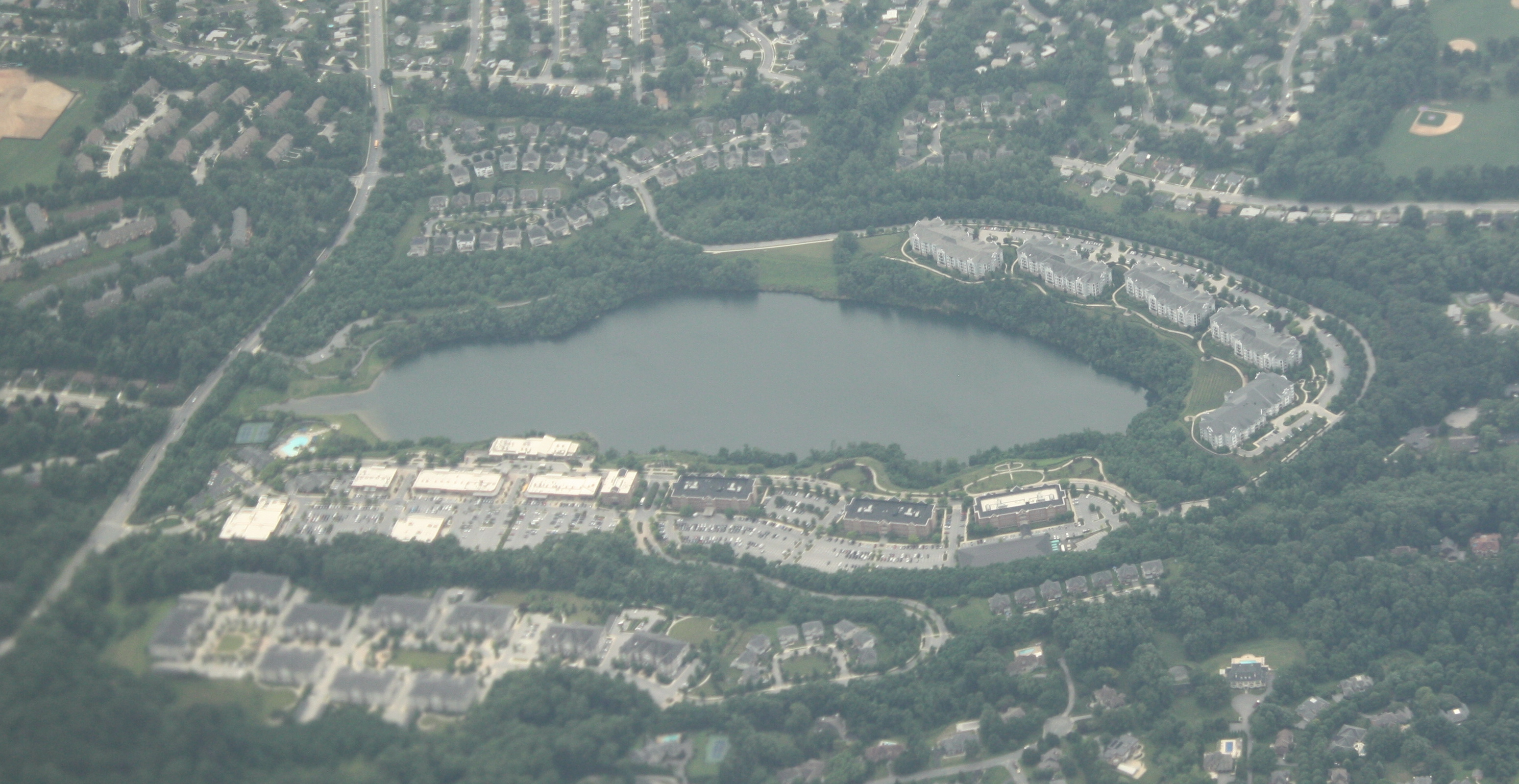
Oblique view in July 2022
