= Route 50 (disambiguation) =

Route 50 may refer to:

- U.S. Route 50 transcontinental, US highway
- Route 50 (MTA Maryland), a bus route in Baltimore, Maryland
- London Buses route 50
- List of highways numbered 50

== See also ==
- Route Fifty
