= LocalLink 28 (BaltimoreLink) =

Bus route operated by the Maryland Transit Administration

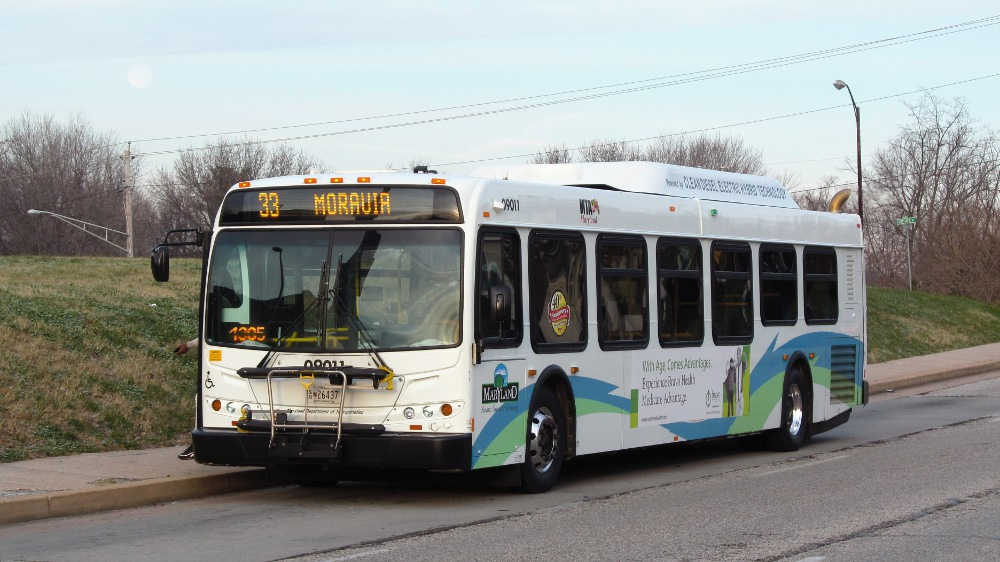

Overview
- System: Maryland Transit Administration
- Garage: Kirk; Northwest
- Status: active
- Began service: 1977
- Predecessors: Route 33; Bus Route 35

Route
- Locale: Baltimore City
- Communities served: Arlington; Park Heights; Roland Park; Guilford; Moravia
- Landmarks served: Baltimore Polytechnic Institute; Western High School; Loyola College; Morgan State University
- Other routes: 1, 3, 5, 8, 11, 12, 15, 19, 36, 38, 44, qb46, qb47, qb48, 50, 51, 52, 53, 54, 57, 58, 61, 91

Service
- Level: Daily
- Frequency: Every 20 minutes Every 10-15 minutes (peak)
- Weekend frequency: Every 30-60 minutes
- Operates: 5:00 am to 12:00 am

LocalLink 28 is a bus route operated by the Maryland Transit Administration in Baltimore. The line currently runs from the Rogers Avenue Metro Subway Station in Northwest Baltimore to a loop in Moravia in Northeast Baltimore. Service is provided about once every 10–15 minutes during rush hour, every 20 minutes midday, every 30 minutes on Saturdays, and hourly on Sundays. The line operates primarily along the cross-town corridor of Coldspring Lane and Moravia Road, transversing Arlington, Park Heights, Roland Park, Homeland, and Montebello. The line passes several universities, including Loyola College, Notre Dame, and Morgan State University.

== History ==
The first bus route to operate along Coldspring Lane was the no. 35 bus, which operated briefly from 1968 to 1969 before being discontinued. The line performed well on AM trips operating to Morgan State, and PM trips from Morgan State, but reverse trips were nearly empty, thereby leading the route to be considered a failure at the time.

The no. 33 designation was previously used in Baltimore transit history for three other routes, including a streetcar that served the Arlington area, near a portion of the present Route 33. The other routes include a streetcar route along Hudson Street that operated 1920-24, and was merged into the no. 18 streetcar (currently bus route 7, and a bus that operated along Milton Street 1950-1954 that is now a part of Route 13.

The current Route 33 started operating in 1977. At that time, it was introduced as an experimental service, with expectations that it would not be successful. It ran on weekdays only during rush hour and midday, and there was no evening or weekend service. Its route was from Arlington to Morgan State only.

About a year later, the line was seen as somewhat of a success. Service was extended during rush hour to the current Moravia loop, and middays to Montebello State Hospital.

The line saw no further improvements until 1986. During that year, evening and Saturday service were added. On weekdays, the line operate until 10 PM, and on Saturdays, intervals were 90 minutes, the most service allowable with a single bus.

In 1993, the line was improved again. All trips were extended to the Moravia loop, and midday service was improved from intervals of 50 to 35 minutes. Evening hours were extended to midnight, and Saturday service was doubled to intervals of 45 minutes.

In 1995, Sunday service on this line was added, though it operated only once every 90 minutes, the previous Saturday frequency.

In 2005, as part of the Greater Baltimore Bus Initiative, the line saw an unplanned extension. The original plan was to extend Route 33 to Eastpoint Mall via North Point Boulevard, and to improve the frequency. But with a public outcry in response to the elimination of certain branches on other lines, particularly a deviation on Route 35, Route 33 was extended to provide bus service in those communities. Service that was extended to Eastpoint Mall started operating via the Armistead Gardens community. This resulted in a slight reduction in service frequency except on Sundays. But the frequency of service on this line, which had been proposed for an increase in the original phase of GBBI, was improved in 2006.

Three months later, the route was extended again about a mile to the Essex Park-and-Ride lot in order to improve efficiency in looping. A later modification shifted service from Eastern Avenue to Rolling Mill Road.

On August 30, 2009, all trips on Route 33 were shortened to the Moravia loop, and Route 24 was extended west from Middle River to replace service south of Moravia.

In 2017, Route 33 was renamed Route 28 under BaltimoreLink.
