= LocalLink 85 (BaltimoreLink) =

Bus route that operates in Baltimore, Maryland and its suburbs

Overview
- System: Maryland Transit Administration
- Garage: Northwest
- Status: active
- Began service: 2008
- Predecessors: Routes M-3, M-8, and 54

Route
- Locale: Baltimore City; Baltimore County
- Communities served: Rockdale; Milford Mill; Sudbrook Park; Fallstaff; Glen; Pimlico; Park Heights; Mondawmin
- Landmarks served: Northwest Hospital; Milford Mill Academy; Pimlico Race Course; Druid Hill Park; Mondawmin Mall
- Other routes: 1, 5, 7, 13, 16, 21, 22, 27, 33, 44, 51, 52, 53, 58, 59, 60, 77, 91, 99

Service
- Level: Daily
- Frequency: Every 15 minutes Every 10 minutes (peak)
- Weekend frequency: Every 15 minutes
- Operates: 24 Hours a Day

LocalLink 85 is a bus route that operates in Baltimore and its suburbs. All trips operate from the Penn-North Metro Subway Station in Baltimore City to the Milford Mill Metro Subway Station in Pikesville. The route, which started operating on August 24, 2008, is a combination of the most recent versions of the former routes M-3 and M-8, which had been operating since 1984 and 1987 respectively. Prior to these dates, the routes had been served by other buses and streetcars.

In June 2017 The Maryland Transit Administration launched BaltimoreLink, a complete rebranding of the transit system, which renamed Route 54 to LocalLink 85

== History ==
Prior to its use in 2008, Route 85 had been used for bus service along Liberty and Milford Mill Roads from 1948 to 1955. With this exception, other designations were used for service along all portions of the current route.

=== 1916 to 1948 ===
In 1916, the no. 5 streetcar started operating along the Park Heights Avenue corridor. This route originally operated to Emory Grove in Reisterstown, but later would be shortened in several steps and gradually replaced by various buses. It was truncated to Pikesville in 1932, Manhattan Avenue (near Northern Parkway) in 1938, and ultimately saw its end as a streetcar in 1948.

Route E became the first bus to operate to Randallstown in 1922, and continued to operate under this designation until it was redesignated as Route 54 in 1948.

=== 1948 to 1984 ===
In 1948, the no. 5 streetcar was converted into a bus operation. The line was identified as the no. 5/7 line from 1948 to 1959, and was then split into two separate lines, identified as the no. 5 and 7. From this day until 1984, Route 5 provided service at all times along Park Heights Avenue from Slade Avenue to downtown Baltimore and beyond. Route 5 continued to provide service on Park Heights Avenue when the Metro was not operating until 2001, when full-time Sunday Metro service was introduced on Route M-3.

The original no. 54 line provided service from 1948 to 1955 along Liberty and Milford Mill Roads. In 1955, the now-defunct Route 28 absorbed this service. Route 28 provided this service full-time until 1984, when various Metro connection services replaced Route 28 service during Metro's hours of operation. Route 28 continued to operate 7 days a week until 1996, when the line was absorbed by Routes 5 and 27. Sunday service on Route 28 continued to operate until 2001, when Sunday Metro connection bus service was introduced.

=== 1984 to 2008 ===
==== Route M-3 ====
Route M-3 started operating on June 18, 1984, between the Mondawmin Metro Subway Station and the intersection of Park Heights and Slade Avenues during Metro's hours of operation. Prior this date, Route 5 had used the bus loop of Slade Avenue, Reisterstown Road, and Seven Mile Lane. Route 5 and the new Route M-3 continued to use this loop.

In 1985, the line was extended south to the Penn-North Metro Subway Station, where it continued to operate until its final day of service in 2008, and where Route 54 continues to operate to this day. Route M-3 actually traveled a few blocks south of Penn-North to a loop at Cumberland and Carey Streets, where Route 21 also had a layover.

In 1987, Route M-3 was extended west to the new Milford Mill Metro Subway Station. The route remained unchanged for more than 20 years, with the exception of a short period of time in which selected trips operated via the Greenhill Apartments. This service is now provided more regularly by Route 97.

In September 2001, Sunday service was added with a schedule identical to Saturday service.

==== Route M-8 ====
On June 18, 1984, Route R-4 began operation between the Rogers Avenue Metro Subway Station and Randallstown. On August 31, 1987, the route was redesignated M-8, and the origin was briefly changed to the Reisterstown Plaza Station, but the routing change was reverted less than two weeks later due to customer complaints.

In 1997, MTA proposed to extend Route M-8 about a mile west of Randallstown to the intersection of Deer Park and Winands Roads in Kings Point. This plan was in response to the many riders who are forced to walk beyond the current loop to reach the residential and commercial development not served by any public bus line. However, this plan was scrapped less than three weeks before it was scheduled to be implemented as a result of community opposition. Brochures that were distributed announcing the Fall 1997 schedules changes indicated that the route would be extended as planned.

In September 2001, Sunday service was introduced on Route M-8 with a schedule identical to that on Saturday.

On October 23, 2005, Route M-8 was modified as part of the Greater Baltimore Bus Initiative. The new routing of the line was from the Milford Mill Metro Station to Randallstown. The original plan for Route M-8 was also to extend the line to the Owings Mills Station, but this was fought due to opposition from residents along McDonogh Road. Also controversial was the loss of service on Route M-8 along Liberty Road east of Milford Mill Road, as this would require riders to cross Liberty Road to transfer to the already existent Route M-1 to continue along the corridor, and that riders would lose the direct connection to several routes at the Rogers Avenue Station.

Service along Milford Mill Road was previously provided by Route P-6 from 1984 to 1987, which operate from the Reisterstown Plaza Station. In 1987, this was replaced by Route M-13, which ran from new Milford Mill Station to Liberty and Milford Mill Roads before looping via Liberty Road, Rolling Road, and Church Lane every 26 minutes. Route M-13 also had a branch to Bellemore Farms via Scotts Level Road that ran every 26 minutes during peak hours.

In 1988, Route M-13 was merged into Route M-1, and selected M-1 trips (hourly at most times) were extended to Milford Mill Station. Other selected M-1 trips during peak hours operated from Milford Mill Station to Bellemore Farms. Bellemore Farms service, which had been considered for elimination in 1998, was finally discontinued in 2005 as part of GBBI.

Sunday service along Milford Mill Road was provided by Route 7 until 2001.

=== Plan to combine routes ===
The plan to combine routes M-3 and M-8 was first introduced early in 2006 as "Phase II" of the Greater Baltimore Bus Initiative. While this change itself was not widely opposed, the Maryland General Assembly passed language in its budget prohibiting any bus routes from being changed unless at least two public hearings were held. This effectively put the plan to merge these two routes on hold.

The plan was reintroduced at the hearings that were later held. While it had been supported by advocacy groups on the basis that it enabled direct bus service between Randallstown the Park Heights area of Northwest Baltimore, and that it once again allowed those in the Randallstown area a direct connection to several bus routes lost when the routing of M-8 had been modified in 2005, concern was addressed over the fact the new longer route would make worsen schedule adherence.

In 2007, GBBI was canceled, and the state announced plans to make more incremental changes, further delaying the plan to merge these lines. But during the spring of 2008, a series of hearings were held in which the plan was reintroduced. The only difference was that the new line would have a new numerical designation. The letter "M" would be dropped, and the new route would be identified as no. 54.

When the new combined route started, the layover spot at the intersection of Cumberland and Carey Streets remained. But while southbound M-3 buses had destination signs that read "PENN-NORTH" throughout the line's existence, Route 54 buses operating to the same location until were marked "Cumberland & Carey." This changed on February 8, 2009, when the routing of the bus loop was changed to use some streets in the Reservoir Hill area, and now read "North Avenue."
