= Sudbrook Park =

Historic district in Maryland, United States

- U.S. National Register of Historic Places
- U.S. Historic district
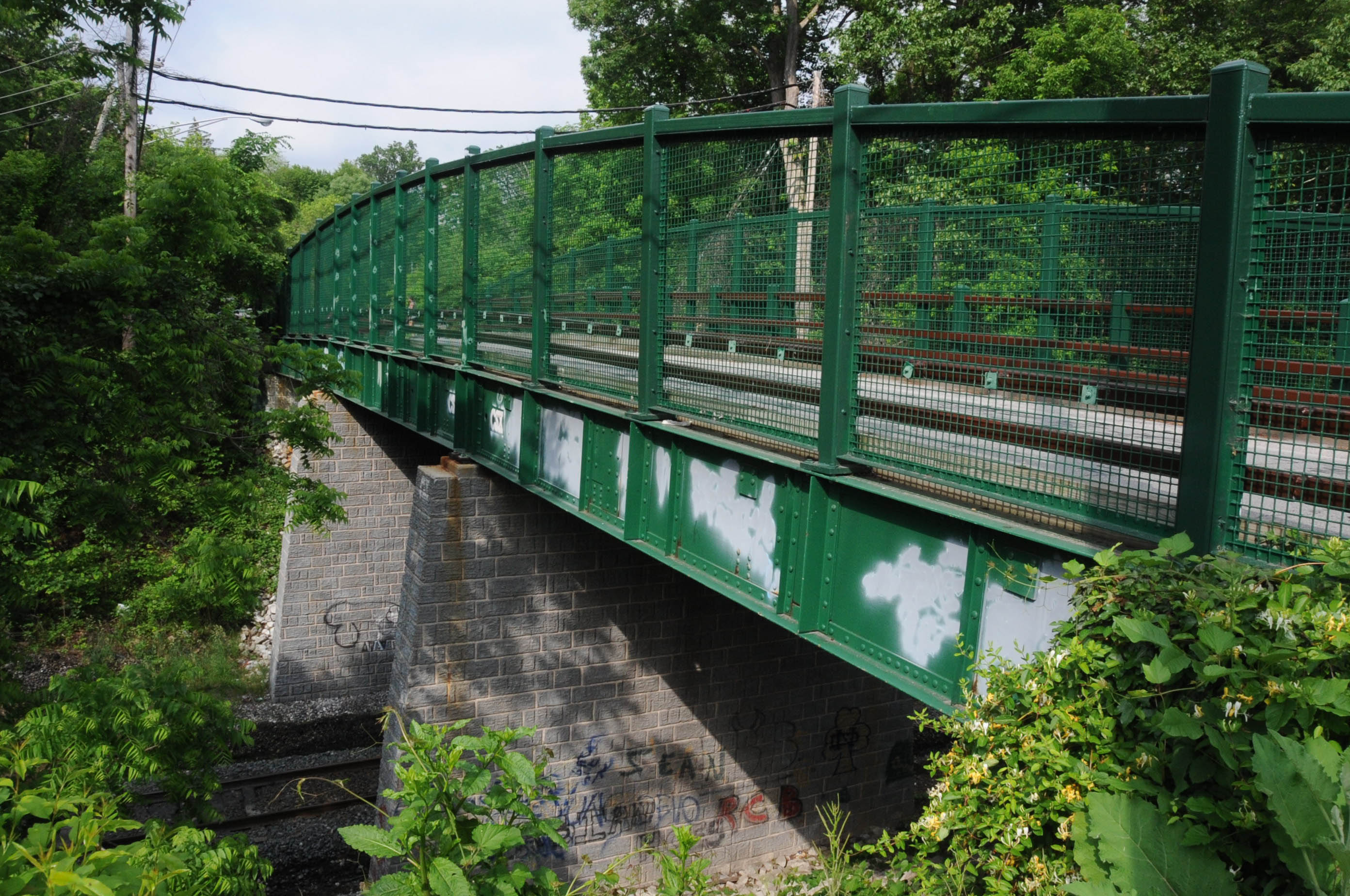

- Location within Maryland Location within the United States
- Nearest city: Pikesville, Maryland
- Coordinates: 39°21′58″N 76°43′49″W
- Area: 200 acres (81 ha)
- Built: 1890
- Architect: Olmsted, Frederick Law
- Architectural style: Colonial Revival, Queen Anne, Shingle Style
- NRHP reference No.: 73000904
- Added to NRHP: June 19, 1973

Sudbrook Park is a historic neighborhood near Pikesville, Maryland located just northwest of the Baltimore.

The community dates to 1889 when it was designed by American landscape architect Frederick Law Olmsted, Sr. (1822–1903) and developed by the Sudbrook Company. Known most for designing well-known urban projects like Central Park in New York City, Olmsted conceived this "suburban village" with curved roads and open green spaces, traits that set the community apart from its contemporaries. Two homes in the district were designed by architect George Archer in the Colonial Revival style.

Sudbrook Park was registered on the National Register of Historic Places in 1973, and from 1993 to 1999 portions of Sudbrook Park became listed as Baltimore County Historic Districts.

Today, the community continues to uphold Olmsted's vision through community association regulations. It is a tight-knit community and holds several annual events and neighborhood activities.

== One-lane bridge ==
One of Sudbrook Park's unique features is the one-lane bridge that crosses over Western Maryland Railway. Constructed in 1889, the bridge stood for more than a century with a wooden platform. In 2005, the bridge closed for reconstruction. It reopened about a year later with an asphalt pavement, retaining its one-lane status in order to preserve the community's historic charm.

== Gallery ==
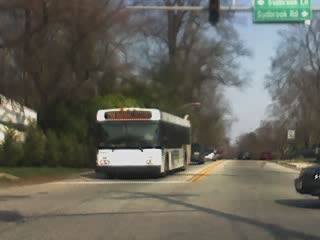
The intersection of Milford Mill Road and Sudbrook Lane

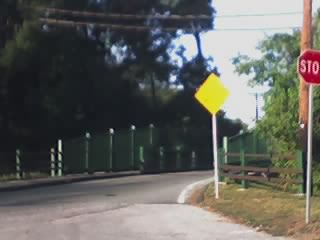
The historic one-lane bridge on Sudbrook Lane
