= LocalLink 37 (BaltimoreLink) =

Bus route operated by the Maryland Transit Administration

Route 77
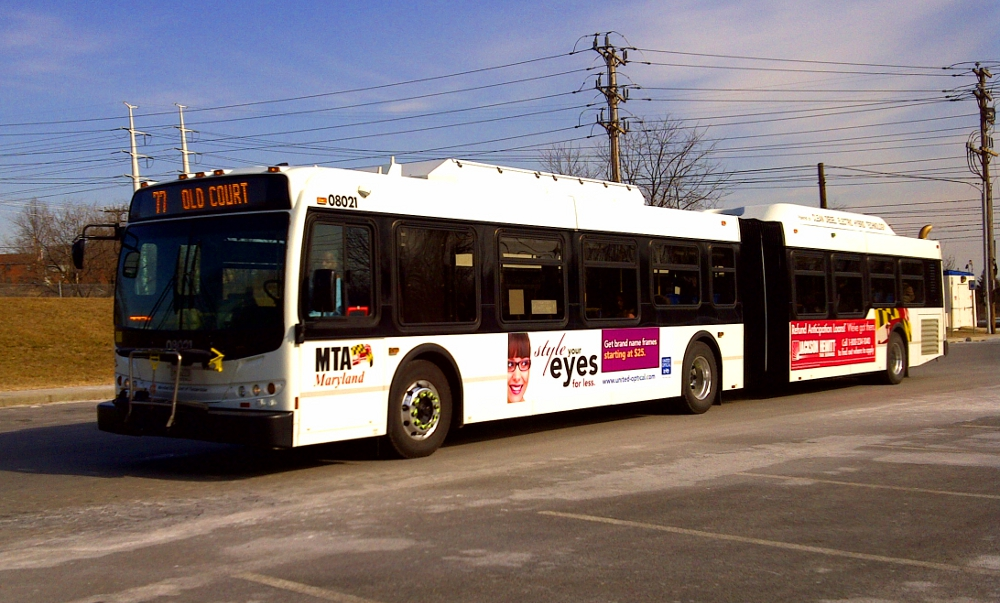

Overview
- System: Maryland Transit Administration
- Garage: Bush; Northwest
- Status: active
- Began service: 1974
- Predecessors: Shuttle Bus Route 35 (1966)

Route
- Locale: Baltimore City; Baltimore County
- Communities served: Randallstown; Rockdale; Milford Mill; Windsor Mill; Woodlawn; Catonsville; Arbutus; Halethorpe; Lansdowne
- Landmarks served: Social Security Administration; Security Square Mall; Westview Mall; CCBC Catonsville campus UMBC; Halethorpe MARC Rail Station
- Other routes: 10, 15, 16, 17, 18, 20, 23, 35, 36, qb40, 44, 51, 52, 53, 54, 57, 99, 150

Service
- Level: Daily
- Frequency: Every 30 minutes Every 30 minutes (peak)
- Weekend frequency: Every 30-60 minutes
- Operates: 5:00 am to 12:30 am

Route 77 is a bus route operated by the Maryland Transit Administration in the suburbs of Baltimore. The line currently runs from the Old Court Metro Subway Station in Pikesville, Maryland, to the Patapsco Light Rail Stop and serves Randallstown, Windsor Mill, Woodlawn, Catonsville, Arbutus, Halethorpe, and Lansdowne as well as the campuses of UMBC and CCBC Catonsville (formerly Catonsville Community College).

== History ==
Route 77 was one of the first cross-county bus lines in Baltimore County, Maryland. It started operating in 1974 as an experimental service, originating from the central business district of Pikesville, and terminating at UMBC.

Prior to its introduction, most of the route of Route 77 was not served by any bus lines. For a brief period in 1966, a shuttle service identified as Route 35 operated between UMBC and Catonsville Community College. Streetcar followed by bus service operated in the Halethorpe area. Route 20 operated between Security Square and Westview Malls along a different route, and a branch of Route 44 served Rutherford Business Park (and continued to until 2005).

At that time, service was provided on weekdays only, with rush hour service operating only once every 40 minutes and midday service provided every 50 minutes. The line, which was designed to provide service for the students of UMBC and Catonsville Community College and had its schedule coordinated to the classes of these two institutions, did not provide service out of Pikesville before 6:30 AM or UMBC before 7:30 AM. Within the decades that followed, the line performed above expectations, drawing riders from far beyond the college crowd and proving that a cross-county (suburb-to-suburb) bus route could succeed in the Baltimore area.

In 1987, in conjunction with the opening of the Old Court Metro Subway Station and the extension of Route M-2 to this location, the station also became the new northern terminus for Route 77. Some trips operated along the old route to Pikesville during a period of time when Old Court Station was closed at night. This portion was discontinued in 2005.

In 1995, selected trips were extended south of UMBC to the Patapsco Light Rail Stop through the Halethorpe area, improving connections. The frequency was also slightly improved.

In 1997, Saturday service was added. At first, it operated only between Old Court and Security Square Mall, but it was later extended to UMBC. Sunday service was added in 2001.

In 2005, as part of the Greater Baltimore Bus Initiative, all trips were extended to the Patapsco Light Rail Stop, and the route was slightly changed to replace a portion of Route 31, which was merged into other routes. Midday and Saturday service was increased to one bus every 30 minutes.

== See also ==
- Route 99
