= CityLink Lime (BaltimoreLink) =

Bus route operated by the Maryland Transit Administration

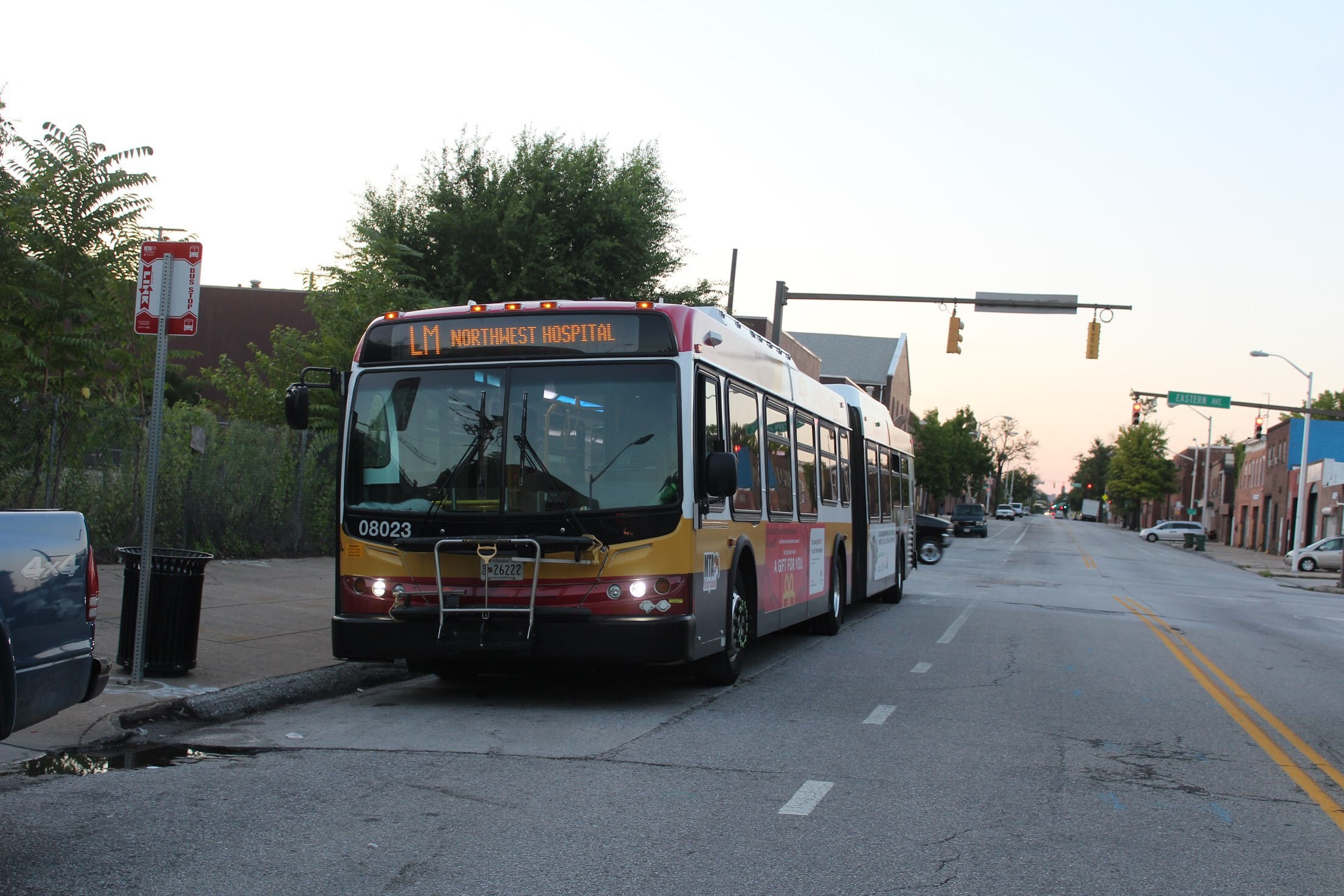

Overview
- System: MTA BaltimoreLink
- Garage: Northwest
- Status: active
- Began service: 2009
- Predecessors: Route M-1

Route
- Locale: Baltimore City; Baltimore County
- Communities served: 1, 5, 7, 16, 22, 44, 51, 53, 54, 57, 77, 91, 97, 99
- Landmarks served: Baltimore City Community College
- Start: Northwest Hospital
- End: Harbor East
- Other routes: 1, 5, 7, 16, 22, 44, 51, 53, 54, 57, 77, 91, 97

Service
- Level: Daily
- Frequency: Every 10-15 minutes Every 8-10 minutes (peak)
- Weekend frequency: Every 20-30 minutes
- Operates: 4:00 am to 1:00 am

CityLink Lime (abbreviated LM) is a CityLink bus route operated by the Maryland Transit Administration in Baltimore and its suburbs. The line currently runs from the Mondawmin Metro Subway Station along Liberty Heights Avenue and Liberty Road to a loop known as in Milford Mill with buses marked as "Milford Mill" (not to be confused with the Milford Mill Metro Subway Station, where this route presently does not operate). The loop is composed of a square block, consisting of Liberty Road, Rolling Road, Church Lane, and Milford Mill Road. The spot of the layover depends on the time of day.

The line was known as Route M-1 from 1984 until its renaming on August 30, 2009, when no routing changes were made.

== History ==
CityLink Lime is the successor to various bus and streetcar lines, including Route 52, the No. 32 streetcar and bus, and the now-defunct Bus Routes 28 and 37.

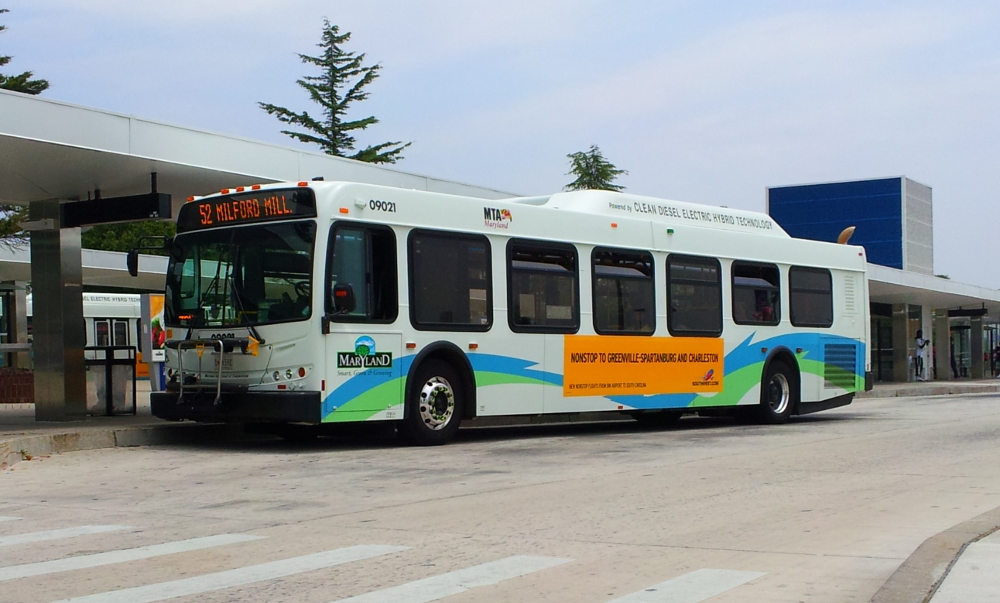
Mondawmin-bound Route 52 bus

Routes 28 and 37 had served the Liberty Heights corridor since 1947. The main bus line serving Liberty Heights Avenue in both directions was Route 28. Route 28 had operated since 1947 between the Liberty Heights Avenue corridor and Cherry Hill with other destinations. All buses that had operated from Cherry Hill and other locations in South Baltimore to Liberty Heights had been given the no. 28 designation. All buses that originated from Liberty Heights with a destination other than Cherry Hill were identified as no. 28. But all buses that originated in the Liberty Heights area and had a final destination of Cherry Hill were designated no. 37. This was done to alert white residents of the communities in the Liberty Heights area that the bus's final destination was Cherry Hill, then a low class black community. This practice was discontinued in 1974 when the no. 37 designation was dropped, and all buses along this route were given the no. 28 designation.

Route M-1 started operating in 1984, taking over the service previously provided by Route 28. Route 28 had operated along the Liberty Heights corridor since 1947. Another line designated Route 37 had provided some of the eastbound service until 1974. The no. 32 streetcar had operated along Liberty Heights from 1920 to 1955, and as a bus from 1955 to 1959 before this service was merged into the no. 28 bus.

When Route M-1 began in 1984, it operated along its present route, though it has undergone various changes before resuming its original route. In 1988, Route M-1 was combined with Route M-13, and selected trips were extended along Milford Mill Road to Milford Mill Station. In addition, other trips operated between the Milford Mill Station and a community off Scotts Level Road in Pikesville known as "Bellemore Farms" (also previously a branch of Route M-13).

The line continued following this route for the next 15 years, with the only change being the addition of Sunday service in 2001, when Sunday service was introduced on all M-lines. During this time, buses on Liberty could either be marked "Milford Mill" or "Milford Mill Station," with station flashing alternately, requiring those wishing to reach Milford Mill Station to wait for the sign to change. The line also had occasional short turns at Gwynn Oak Avenue and Buckingham Road.

In 2005, as part of the Greater Baltimore Bus Initiative, a comprehensive overhaul plan for the region's transit system, Route M-1 returned to its pre-1988 route, as all service along Milford Mill Road was provided by the modified Route M-8 (now a part of Route 54). No service was provided to Bellemore Farms.

On August 30, 2009, the M-1 was renamed Route 52, completing MTA's redesignation of all M-lines to two-digit designations.

In June 2011, service frequency on Sundays was adjusted to operate every 20 minutes.

== In popular culture ==
In the novel Passing By Patricia Jones and Patricia J Bacchus, the narrator describes catching the bus on Liberty Heights Avenue down to Hilton Street and staring at the water (Lake Ashburton is located at this intersection).
