= LocalLink 83 (BaltimoreLink) =

Bus route operated by the Maryland Transit Administration

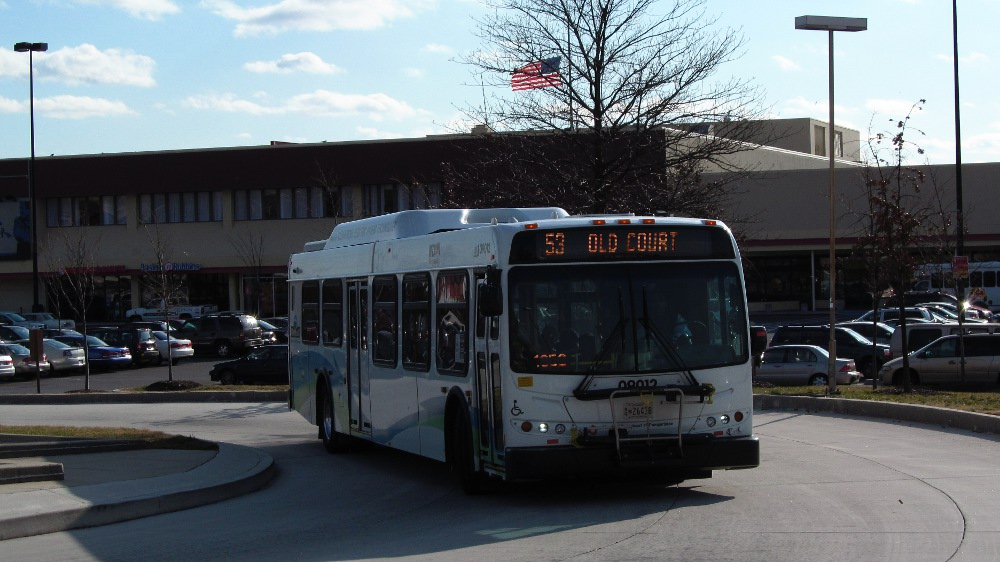

Overview
- System: Maryland Transit Administration
- Garage: Northwest
- Status: active
- Began service: 1984
- Predecessors: Route 53 (2009-2017); Bus Route L (1929-1948); Bus Route 5/7 (1948-1959); Bus Route 7 (1959-1984); Bus Route M-2 (1984-2009)

Route
- Locale: Baltimore City; Baltimore County
- Communities served: Pikesville; Park Heights
- Landmarks served: Reisterstown Road Plaza; Druid Hill Park
- Other routes: 1, 5, 7, 16, 21, 22, 27, 33, 44, 51, 52, 54, 58, 59, 60, 77, 91, 97, 99

Service
- Level: Daily
- Frequency: Every 15-30 minutes Every 10-15 minutes (peak)
- Weekend frequency: Every 20-25 minutes
- Operates: 4:30 am to 2:30 am

LocalLink 83 is a bus route in Baltimore and its suburbs. The line currently runs from the Old Court Metro Subway Station in Pikesville, Maryland to the Mondawmin Metro Subway Station in Northwest Baltimore along Old Court Road and Reisterstown Road, serving the communities of Park Heights and the Reisterstown Road Plaza. The line is the successor to Bus Route 7, which still operates south of Mondawmin. Route 7 operated along Reisterstown Road outside the Metro's hours of operation until 2001.

Route 83 was known as Route 53 until BaltimoreLink in 2017, and Route M-2 until it was renamed in 2009. No routing changes were made at the time.

== History ==
The No. 5 Streetcar operated through Pikesville starting in 1916, and until 1938. The line operating through the city not along Reisterstown Road, but on the nearby parallel Park Heights Avenue. Bus service on Reisterstown Road inside of Baltimore City started in 1929, provided on Route L. This became a part of Route 5/7 in 1948. In 1959, Route 5/7 was split, with the no. 5 designation being assigned to the Park Heights Avenue line, and the no. 7 designation being given to the route on Reisterstown Road. Route 7 was also combined with Route 18 (the former Pennsylvania Avenue Streetcar Line) at the time, providing service downtown from all points along Reisterstown Road.

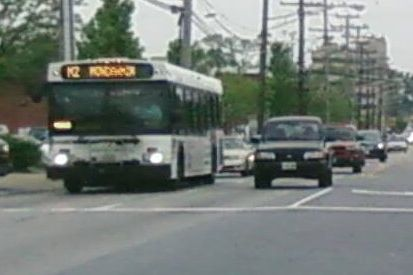
A route M-2 bus, the line's designation 1984-2009

Route M-2 started operating in 1984 after the Baltimore Metro's first segment opened, and Route 7 was split. Route M-2 then originated and terminated in the north near Reisterstown & Old Court Roads in Pikesville's central business district. At that time, the Old Court Metro Subway Station had not yet opened, and the segment of Old Court Road on which this line currently operates was served by Route 77.

In 1987, when the Metro was extended to Owings Mills, Route M-2 was extended to the Old Court Metro Subway Station. Since then, the line's route has never changed. Only minor schedule changes have been made, and in 2001, Sunday service was added.

In 1993, as a cost-saving measure, MTA started to close three of its Metro stations, including Old Court, at 8 PM, and for trains running later than this time to bypass these stops. This made travel more difficult for riders of Route M-2 accustomed to transferring in this area. During this time, Route 77 was extended to Pikesville after 8 PM. MTA reopened all these stations in the evening in 2001.

On August 30, 2009, the M-2 was renamed 53. This completed MTA's plan to rename all M-lines to two-digit routing designations.
