= LocalLink 57 (BaltimoreLink) =

Bus route operated by the Maryland Transit Administration

Overview
- System: Maryland Transit Administration
- Garage: Kirk
- Status: active
- Began service: 1948
- Predecessors: Bus Route U

Route
- Locale: Baltimore City
- Communities served: Belair-Edison; Moravia Park; Orchard Ridge
- Other routes: 5, 15, 22, 24, 33, 44, qb46, qb47

Service
- Level: Daily
- Frequency: Every 40 minutes Every 20 minutes (peak)
- Weekend frequency: Every 40 minutes
- Operates: 6:00 am to 7:00 pm

LocalLink 57 is a bus route operated by the Maryland Transit Administration in Baltimore. The line, which serves the Belair-Edison area, is the oldest shuttle-like bus route in Baltimore, dating back to the 1940s. It operates in a similar circular fashion from its lone layover point, the intersection of Erdman Avenue and Belair Road. Its routing serves the communities of Mannasota and Mayfield and Herring Run Park. It was first known as Route U from 1940 to 1948. It became counterclockwise only in 1992 in order to save costs and simplify service, then operating consistently every 20 minutes during all its hours. Service on a few one-way streets along the route were discontinued as a result.

In 1997, service was shifted to Bowley's Lane in order to provide a connection to Route 33. In 2004, weekend service was modified to serve the Parkside and Erdman shopping centers. These trips are identified in the schedule as the red route. As a result, intervals on weekends were reduced to one bus every 40 minutes. On April 2, 2007, Route 50 started to provide service on selected trips to the Claremont Senior Home. In early 2010, schedule change "reloaded" the route. These new changes meant service will be provided to the area shopping centers 7 days a week. The branch to the Claremont Senior Home was ended, since the building was razed for the Orchard Ridge development. The line was also extended to serve the apartments on Moravia Park Drive. The layover was moved from Mayfield Avenue just east of Belair Road to Erdman Avenue just west of Mannasota Ave.

In 2017 under BaltimoreLink, Route 50 was renamed Route 57.
