= LocalLink 34 (BaltimoreLink) =

Bus route operated by the Maryland Transit Administration

Route 34
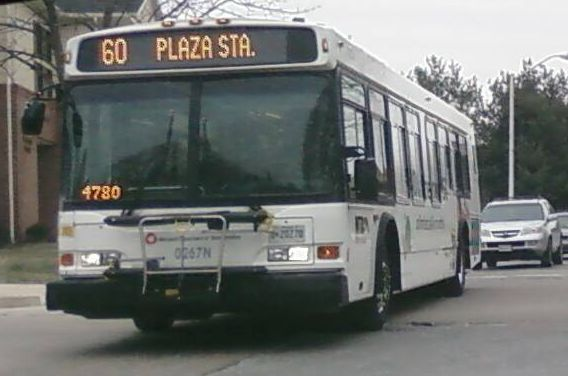

Overview
- System: Maryland Transit Administration
- Garage: Northwest
- Status: active
- Began service: 1973
- Predecessors: Route 60, Route M-10

Route
- Locale: Baltimore City; Baltimore County
- Communities served: Fallstaff; Ranchleigh; Mt. Washington; Bare Hills; Ruxton; Brooklandville
- Landmarks served: Reisterstown Road Plaza; Mt. Washington Light Rail Stop; Falls Road Light Rail Stop
- Other routes: 18, 27, 53, 54, 58, 59

Service
- Level: Weekdays Only
- Frequency: Every 60 minutes Every 40 minutes (peak)
- Operates: 5:30 am to 8:00 pm

Route 34 is a bus route operated by the Maryland Transit Administration in Baltimore and its suburbs. The line currently operates weekdays only from the Reisterstown Plaza Metro Subway Station to Stevenson University during peak hours and Greenspring Station midday.

The route is based on that of the former Route 60 (pre-BaltimoreLink), and Route M-10. It is especially similar to the pre-1992 route of Route M-10, except that it has no deviations from Clarks Lane, and that it operates via Smith Avenue to Mt. Washington rather than Old Pimlico Road to Falls Road.

== History ==
The Greenspring Avenue corridor and the Cheswolde area was first served by the no. 47 streetcar prior to 1950. The no. 47 streetcar operated from Mt. Washington along Kelly Avenue, long before there was a light rail stop in the area. The line was originally constructed with the intention of being part of the Emory Grove Streetcar Line, but it was never completed to this extent, and later abandoned.

The current Route 60 replaced a part of Route M-10 on August 24, 2008. Route M-10 had operated along various routes, serving Greenspring Station and other places in between since 1987. From 1984 to 1987, a Route P-7 had operated along a similar route.

Service to Villa Julie College, the predecessor of Stevenson University, has been provided by a variety of routes in the past. Route 58A operated from 1973 to 1975 from the Reisterstown Road Plaza to Greenwood via Villa Julie College. This service was later merged into Route 5 as a special branch, which operated until 1984, when Metro connection services took over. From 1987 to 2005, a line known as Route M-12 reached Villa Julie, also serving Greenwood, Stevenson, and Caves Road. This line, which underperformed and faced numerous cutbacks over its years of operation, was eliminated in 2005 as part of the Greater Baltimore Bus Initiative. MTA stated that the line was requiring a taxpayer subsidy of $9.41 per rider. Following public opposition, Route M-10 was extended from Greenspring Station to Villa Julie, and this area is currently covered by Route 60. This was after the portion of Route M-10 along Falls Road was also proposed for elimination but successfully fought.

=== 1984-1992 ===
In 1984, in conjunction with the opening of the Baltimore Metro Subway, two new routes were formed, Routes P-7 and R-2. Route P-7 operated between the Reisterstown Plaza Station and Ranchleigh, serving Fallstaff. Route R-2 operated between the Rogers Avenue Station and Mt. Washington serving Cheswolde.

In 1987, in conjunction with the opening of Phase II of the Metro, Routes P-7 and R-2 were redesignated Routes M-10 and M-5 respectively. Initially, both operated on portions of Falls Road now served by Route 60. Route M-5 briefly had service to Towson State University via the Ruxton area, but this was later discontinued.

=== 1992-2008 ===
In 1992, in conjunction with the opening of the Light Rail, Routes M-5 and M-10 were combined into a single line, which was given the M-10 designation. The new Route M-10 served both the Reisterstown Plaza and Rogers Avenue Metro stations, the Mt. Washington and Falls Road Light Rail Stops, and all points served by both of the previous routes, with the exception of short blocks on a few streets. Additionally, Saturday service was discontinued.

In 1998, Saturday service was added back to Route M-10, and a branch that operated twice daily via Old Court Road was discontinued. Sunday service was added for the first time ever in 2001.

In 2005, as part of the Greater Baltimore Bus Initiative, service via Old Pimlico Road was discontinued, and all trips were modified to operate to Mt. Washington via Smith Avenue, with all weekday trips continuing to Greenspring Station, and all peak hour trips continuing to Villa Julie College, replacing a portion of Route M-12, which was discontinued. The line was also shortened to Reisterstown Plaza Metro Station. The original plan had been to completely eliminate Route M-10 service on Falls Road, and operate Route M-10 via the present route of Route 58.

=== Changes in 2008 ===
On August 24, 2008, Route M-10 was split into Routes 58 and 60. Route 58 operated along the same routing as before from the Reisterstown Plaza station to the intersection of Smith and Greenspring, then via Greenspring to the new Quarry Lake development. Route 60 was formed to operate along the full length of Clarks Lane without any deviations, and to serve all points of Route M-10 east of Greenspring.

Following complaints from Quarry Lake residents over the buses, Route 58 was modified in February 2009 to operate to Mt. Washington and Route 60 service to Mt. Washington was supplemented.
