= Duke Cameron =

American cardiac surgeon

Duke E. Cameron is an American cardiac surgeon. Formerly Chief of Cardiac Surgery at Johns Hopkins University School of Medicine; the James T. Dresher Sr. Professor of Surgery; Director of Pediatric Cardiac Surgery; and Director of The Dana and Albert "Cubby" Broccoli Center for Aortic Diseases, at the Johns Hopkins Hospital, he returned to Hopkins in 2023. His clinical interests include:

- Adult and pediatric cardiac surgery
- Cardiac transplantation
- Marfan syndrome
- Mitral valve repair
- Aortic surgery including valve-sparing aortic root replacement

He is the editor, along with Stephen C. Yang, of Current Therapy in Thoracic and Cardiovascular Surgery.

In January 2008, Cameron reported a very large surgical series, the 30-year history of surgical treatment in 372 cases of Marfan syndrome at Johns Hopkins Hospital.

He graduated from Harvard College and Yale School of Medicine.
