= LocalLink 52 (BaltimoreLink) =

Bus route operated by the Maryland Transit Administration

Route 52

Overview
- System: Maryland Transit Administration
- Garage: Kirk
- Status: active
- Began service: 2005
- Predecessors: Route 8 Stella Maris branch

Route
- Locale: Baltimore City; Baltimore County
- Communities served: Towson; Stoneleigh; Govans; Waverly
- Landmarks served: Towson Town Center; Towson University; Belvedere Square; Senator Theater
- Other routes: 3, 8, 11, 13, 22, 33, 36, 44, qb48, 55, 58

Service
- Level: Daily
- Frequency: Three am trips, one noon trip, two evening trips
- Weekend frequency: Two am trips, one noon trip, two evening trips
- Operates: 5:30 am to 12:00 am

Route 52 is a bus route operated by the Maryland Transit Administration in Baltimore and its suburbs. The line is a dedicated service for employees of Stella Maris, a complex of long term care facilities in Timonium, Maryland. Route 52 replaced Route 12 under BaltimoreLink.

== History ==
Route 52 was formed in 2005 as Route 12 as a replacement for the Stella Maris branch of Route 8, which was discontinued as a part of the Greater Baltimore Bus Initiative. The branch, along with all other special branches of Route 8, was proposed for total elimination with no replacement under the original GBBI plans. But due to public outcry, service to Stella Maris was retained by MTA on the new Route 12 that operated back then out of the Lutherville Light Rail Stop at the same times these trips were previously provided on the Route 8. MTA continued to serve Stella Maris on the basis that the organization is non-profit, while all other discontinued former branches of Route 8 served for-profit employers.

The original route of Route 12 that started in 2005 was via Ridgely Road and Dulaney Valley Road, but this route was modified twice in February 2006 due to community opposition from Timonium area residents to operating buses on residential streets. On February 5, the route was modified to Cranbrook Road and some other local roads in the Cockeysville area, and on February 19, the new routing was via York Road, Fairmount Avenue, and Dulaney Valley Road, similar to the old Route 8 branch.

On August 24, 2008, Route 12 was modified again to operate between Stella Maris and Greenmount and North Avenues. This was done to enable the line to have a direct connection with bus routes 13, 22, 33, 44, and 55. Such connections were found to be far more in demand than those to the light rail, and riders wishing to connect to the light rail were advised to transfer to Route 8.

Today, Route 12 is one of two buses operated by MTA for the benefit of a single employer. The other is Route 104, which serves Johns Hopkins Hospital.

=== BaltimoreLink ===
On June 18, 2017, as part of the BaltimoreLink transit overhaul Route 12 will be replaced in its entirety by LocalLink 52.
