= Mt. Washington station =

Light rail station in Baltimore, Maryland, US

Mt. Washington
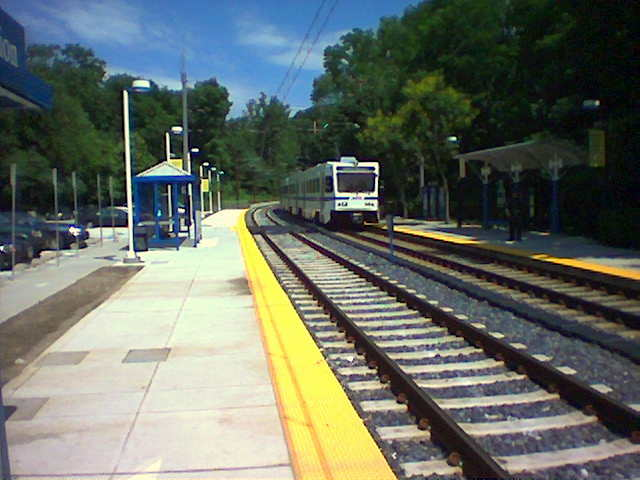
- A northbound train departs Mt. Washington station in 2006

General information
- Location: 5701 Smith Avenue; Baltimore, Maryland
- Coordinates: 39.3684°N 76.6523°W
- Owner: Maryland Transit Administration
- Platforms: 2 side platforms
- Tracks: 2
- Connections: MTA: 27, 58, 60

Construction
- Parking: 83 free spaces
- Accessible: Yes

History
- Opened: April 2, 1992

Passengers
- 2017: 421 daily

Services
| Preceding station | Maryland Transit Administration | Following station |
|---|---|---|
| Cold Spring Lane toward BWI Airport or Glen Burnie | Light RailLink | Falls Road toward Hunt Valley |
Location

Mt. Washington station is a Baltimore Light RailLink station in the Mount Washington neighborhood of northern Baltimore, Maryland. The station has two side platforms serving two tracks.

== History ==
The station was built on the site of the defunct Northern Central Railway's Mount Washington station. When the current stop opened in 1992, it had only a single track for trains traveling in either direction; a second track was added when the Light Rail's double-tracking project for this station was completed in 2005.

MTA buses do not serve the station directly due to Mount Washington Village's narrow streets. Instead, they use a bus loop along Kelly Avenue, which was constructed in 1949 as a temporary layover for buses following the removal of the Falls Road streetcar line.
