= Milford Mill Road =

Long road primarily situated in Baltimore County, Maryland

Coordinates: 39°20′58″N 76°45′51.5″W

Milford Mill Road-Slade Avenue-Smith Avenue
- Milford Mill Road at Reisterstown Road
- Interactive map of Milford Mill Road-Slade Avenue-Smith Avenue
- Owner: City of Baltimore
- Location: Baltimore
- Postal code: 21201, 21202, 21218
- West end: Dead end west of N. Rolling Road in Windsor Mill
- East end: Newbury Street in Mount Washington

Milford Mill Road, Slade Avenue, and Smith Avenue are a long road mostly in Baltimore County, Maryland that runs through Milford Mill and Pikesville in the suburbs of Baltimore. The road starts out at the light rail stop in historic Mt. Washington Village in Baltimore city as Smith Avenue, and continues through Pikesville up to Seven Mile Lane before its name changes to Slade Avenue, and the road widens to four lanes. The road is known as Slade Avenue until Reisterstown Road, and from there, its name becomes Milford Mill Road until it dead-ends one block south of Rolling Road in an area known as Windsor Mill. It is one of the most heavily used routes in the northwest suburbs of Baltimore, as it is used for cross-county travel by motorists between the Pikesville and Randallstown areas.

== History of the Road ==
At one time, each road with its own name was a separate road, and they did not connect. A small section of Slade Avenue, ran from Seven Mile Lane parallel to Smith Avenue, then curved into Smith. This predated the four-lane Slade Avenue that now runs into what is Smith Avenue.

At this time, Milford Mill Road was a separate road off Reisterstown Road in the Colonial Village area, and it began two blocks south of the intersection of Reisterstown and Slade.

In 1987, in conjunction with the construction of the Milford Mill Metro Subway Station and the subway line that cut across the roadway, parts of Milford Mill Road were relocated in order to provide better access to this station, and Slade/Milford Mill became a single road.

A new overpass was constructed over the Western Maryland Railway where the Metro Subway would eventually run, and a new section was built that would merge into the old part of Slade Avenue. In order to make way for this new segment, several buildings of an apartment complex, then known as the Warren Park Apartments, and currently identified as the Milford Station Apartments, had to be demolished.

A segment of the older portion of Milford Mill Road that runs parallel was renamed to Old Milford Mill Road, and a segment between the railroad and what eventually was named Roman Frasier Drive (current entrance road to the subway) was demolished, and the station was built on that land.

An older segment of Slade west of Reisterstown Road, which was home to several houses, condos, and office buildings, was made into a turn off Milford Mill Road.

In Mt. Washington, a separate stub of Smith Avenue exists that can be accessed from Falls Road. Prior to the construction of I-83, this was part of the longer Smith Avenue. The area around this stub is filled with much commercial development, including Meadowbrook Swim Club, which is well known as the location where Michael Phelps swims, and the now-defunct Northwest Ice Rink, that along with Meadowbrook, Phelps is rumored in a plan to purchase.

== Name ==
Milford Mill Road is given its name from an old mill once located on the road, which dates back to 1728. Slade Avenue was named in honor of William A. Slade, a former Baltimore County sheriff and postmaster. Smith Avenue, which was laid out in 1860 along the south side of Wellwood, was named after Joseph Smith.

The area where the road intersects with Liberty Road has often been referred to as "Milford Mill," but is really called "Milford."

== Landmarks and Communities along road ==
On Milford Mill Road

- Windsor Mill
- Milford Mill
- Milford Mill Academy
- Milford Mill Swim Club
- Historic Sudbrook Park
- Milford Mill Metro Subway Station
- Baltimore County Police Department Pikesville Precinct
- Milford Mill Shopping Center

On Old Milford Mill Road

- Milford Manor Nursing Home

On Slade Avenue

- Suburban Country Club
- Slade Condominiums
- Baltimore Hebrew Congregation

On Smith Avenue

- Pikesville High School
- Wellwood International School
- Pickwick
- Ranchleigh
- Bonnie Ridge
- Greenspring Shopping Center
- Mount Washington (Baltimore City Northwest)

== Public transportation ==
Public transportation is available on all parts of Milford Mill Road and on parts of Slade and Smith Avenues, provided by the Maryland Transit Administration.

The best-known transit along this road is the Milford Mill Metro Subway Station in Pikesville. Construction on this station, which is used by hundreds of commuters each day, was completed in 1987.

Between Park Heights Avenue and Liberty Road, Route 54 operates every 10–30 minutes. About half of these trips operate between Park Heights Avenue and the Metro station only.

Route 52 reaches the intersection of Milford Mill and Liberty Roads, then loops using a single block of Milford Mill Road.

Between Rolling Road and Liberty Road, Route 77 operates. This line runs between the Old Court Metro Subway Station and the Patapsco Light Rail Stop, traveling along the west side of Baltimore County.

On Smith Avenue between Sanzo Road and Mt. Washington, bus service is available on Route 60. Route 58 also serves a portion of this section. In Mt. Washington, where Smith Avenue begins (and it is one way for the first block) is a stop on the Central Light Rail. Due to the small size of the streets in the area, buses do not actually enter the light rail station parking lot, and those wishing to transfer must walk a block.
