= Greenspring Avenue =

Street in Baltimore, Maryland, United States

Coordinates: 39°22′42.95″N 76°41′2.91″W

- Interactive map of Greenspring Avenue
- Location: Baltimore, Baltimore County
- Postal code: 21209, 21211, 21215, 21217, 21117, 21153, 21093
- North end: Tufton Avenue in Reisterstown
- South end: Auchentoroly Terrace in Baltimore

Greenspring Avenue is a road in Baltimore, Maryland and its northwestern suburbs. At one time, Greenspring Avenue was Maryland Route 519 from Worthington Road to Dover Road, but the road has since been decommissioned and no longer has any numerical designation.

== Sections ==
Greenspring Avenue is currently divided into three sections, as follows:

- In Baltimore city: From Druid Hill Park to Northern Parkway
- In Baltimore city: From Northern Parkway to Cross Country Boulevard/Pimlico Road
- In Baltimore city/county: From Cross Country Boulevard to Tufton Avenue.

Greenspring Avenue begins inside of Druid Hill Park, near the Maryland Zoo. The first section, which is approximately 1.9 miles (3.1 km) long, is mostly lined with high-rise and garden apartments. This section ends at Northern Parkway, at Sinai Hospital, and across from Cylburn Park. From here, a left and then a right two blocks later is required to continue along Greenspring.

The next section of Greenspring Avenue starts off of Northern Parkway about one block west of Sinai Hospital, and continues for about 3/4 of a mile to a five-way intersection consisting of Cross Country Boulevard and Pimlico Road, in an area known as Cheswolde. A right turn is required here to continue along Greenspring.

The third and longest section of Greenspring Avenue continues from this intersection for about 10 miles (16 km) until the end of the name Greenspring Avenue for the road. However, the road physically continues beyond this point and is known as Worthington Avenue for the next mile and a half.

It finally continues into Butler Road (Maryland Route 128) before it reaches Hanover Pike (Maryland Route 30), at which point going straight will lead to I-795. This section of the road can be accessed from the Baltimore Beltway at exit 22.

== History ==
The Green Spring Avenue Company was chartered in 1858 to build the portion south of Maryland Route 130 as a turnpike.

== Landmarks along Greenspring Avenue ==
- Maryland National Guard
- Sinai Hospital
- Cylburn Arboretum
- Kennedy Krieger Institute campus

=== Quarry Lake at Greenspring development ===
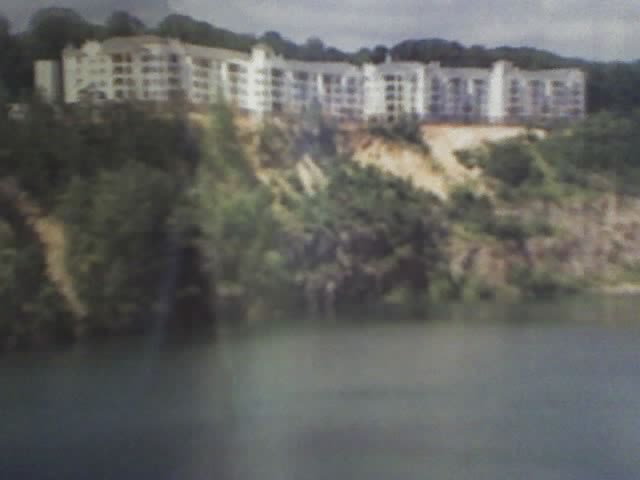
Quarry Lake, the lake in the development of the same name

Throughout the 2000s, construction has been underway for a new development now known as Quarry Lake at Greenspring, which is located between Old Court Road and Smith Avenue.

In 2005, a rock-breaking ceremony was held.

In 2006 and 2007, some commercial properties on the premises opened, including medical office space of Lifebridge Health, Walgreens, and The Fresh Market.

The development also features 83 single-family homes and 500 condos.

The center of the development features is 40-acre (160,000 m^{2}) lake, which is 500 feet (150 m) deep, one of the deepest lakes in the state of Maryland.

== Public transportation ==
Public transportation, provided by the Maryland Transit Administration, is available on or near parts of Greenspring Avenue.

- Route 1 operates between Druid Park Drive and Sinai Hospital.
- Route 27 crosses Greenspring Avenue at Ken Oak Road, and operates one block east of Greenspring Avenue along the parallel Cross Country Boulevard.
- Route 58 (formerly Route M-10) operates between Cross Country Boulevard and Willowglen Drive.
- Route 60 crosses Greenspring Avenue along Greenspring Valley Road (Maryland Route 130).
- In the past, service was provided on Greenspring Avenue between Ken Oak and Cross Country by Route 44 and between Greenspring Valley Road and Greenwood by Route M-12. But these services have been discontinued.

== In popular culture ==
- Greenspring Avenue was the site of a murder in the book Homicide: A Year on the Killing Streets by David Simon.
- In the book A Broken Heart Still Beats by Anne McCracken, Peter and the narrator drive frantically up Greenspring Avenue during an emergency.
- In The Writer on Her Work by Janet Sternburg, the narrator has a near accident while driving on Greenspring Avenue.
