= Pimlico, Baltimore =

Coordinates: 39°21′10″N 76°40′33″W

Pimlico
- Neighborhood of Baltimore
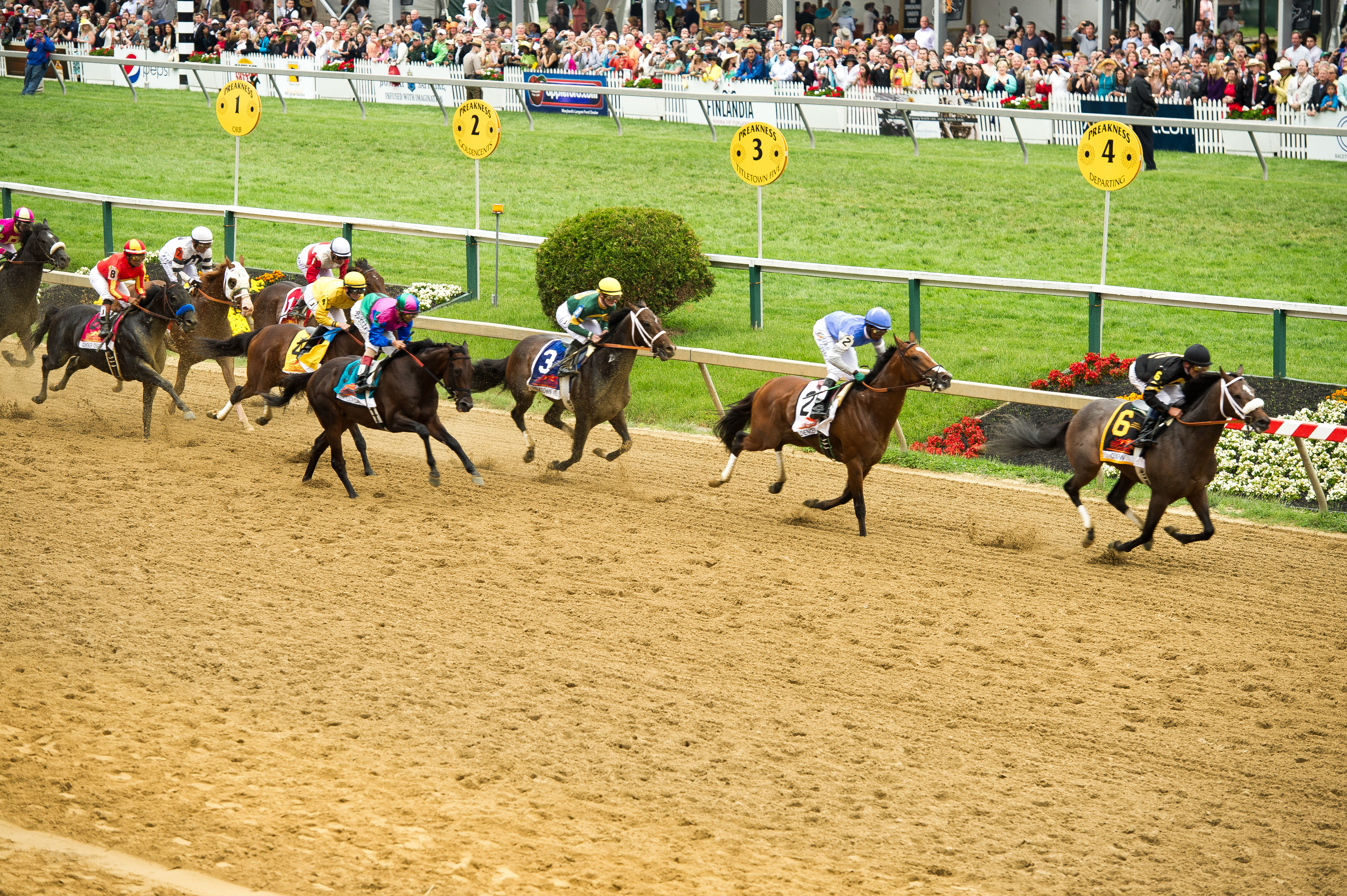
- The Preakness Stakes is held each year in the Baltimore neighborhood of Pimlico.

- Location within Baltimore
- Country: United States
- State: Maryland
- City: Baltimore
- Time zone: UTC-5 (Eastern)
  - Summer (DST): EDT
- ZIP code: 21215
- Area code: 410, 443, and 667

Pimlico is a neighborhood in Baltimore, Maryland. It is the site of Pimlico Race Course, which holds the Preakness Stakes, one of the three legs of the Triple Crown of Thoroughbred Racing. From 1896 through 1915, Pimlico was also the home of Baltimore's Electric Park, a popular amusement park located near the intersection of Reisterstown Road and Belvedere Avenue.

== History ==
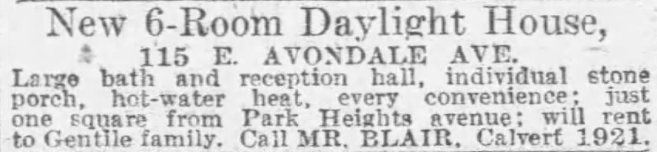
A 1923 advertisement in the Baltimore Sun for housing in Pimlico: "will rent to Gentile family."

Prior to the passage of the Fair Housing Act of 1968, racial covenants were used in Baltimore to exclude African-Americans, Jews, and other minorities. A 1923 Baltimore Sun advertisement for a house in Pimlico says "will rent to Gentile family."

== Demographics ==
As of the 2000 U.S. census, there were 1,145 people living in the Pimlico neighborhood. The racial makeup of Pimlico was 5.1 percent White, 90.6 percent African American, 0.3 percent Native American, 0.3 percent Asian. 59.8 percent of occupied housing units were owner-occupied. 9.3 percent of housing units were vacant. Pimlico has a significant and growing number of Jamaican and African immigrants.

35.5 percent of those in the civilian labor force were employed. The median household income was $23,654.

== Notable people ==
Artist Marie E. Johnson-Calloway was born in Pimlico.

Actor, musician, business woman and activist Jada Pinkett Smith grew up in Pimlico.

== See also ==
- List of Baltimore neighborhoods
