= Cheswolde, Baltimore =

Residential community in Maryland, US

Coordinates: 39°21′48″N 76°41′20″W

Cheswolde is residential community in northwest Baltimore, Maryland. It is located along the Western Run. The main roads running through the area are Greenspring Avenue, Cross Country Boulevard, and Taney Road.

The history of Cheswolde dates back to the 18th century. At that time, Charles Carroll of Carrollton owned the land to the north of the Western Run in the vicinity of Greenspring Avenue and Pimlico Road.

During the 19th century, the land along the Western Run was used for a mill that was damaged in a flood in 1868.

The majority of Cheswolde's current homes were built in the 1950s and 1960s.

Cheswolde has a large Orthodox Jewish population and is one of four areas of the Jewish community of northwest Baltimore. The others are Cross Country, Fallstaff, and Glen.

== See also ==
- List of Baltimore neighborhoods
