= Reisterstown Road Plaza =

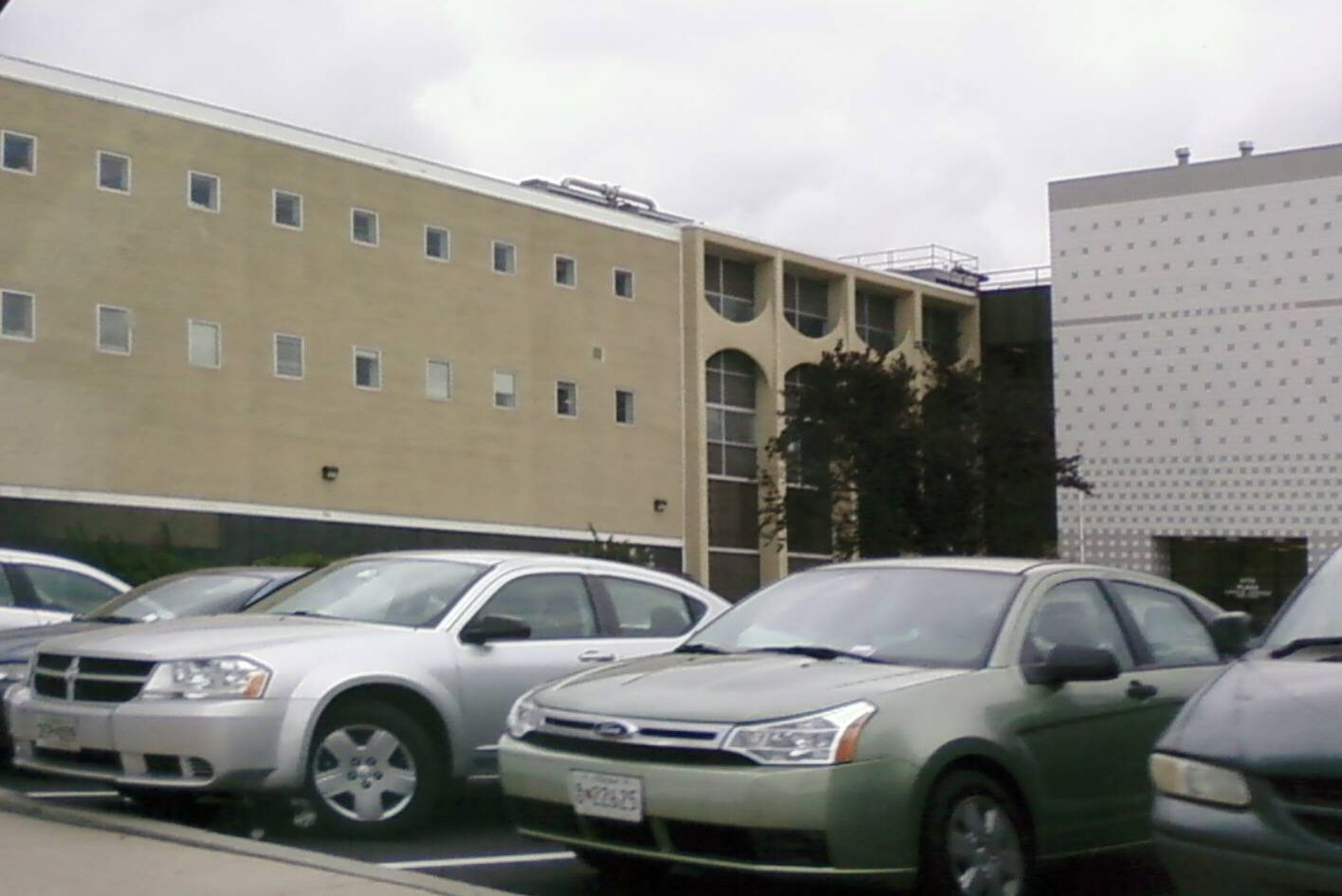
- North side of Reisterstown Road Plaza
- Location: Baltimore, Maryland, United States
- Coordinates: 39.35912°N 76.70513°W
- Address: 6700 block Reisterstown Road
- Opened: 1962
- Num. of anchor tenants: 9 (7 open, 2 vacant)
- Floors: 1 (some offices on a second floor)
- Public transit: Reisterstown Plaza: Metro SubwayLink MTA Maryland bus: 83, 89
- Website: www.reisterstownroadplaza.com

The Reisterstown Road Plaza, usually known since its inception simply as "The Plaza," is a shopping center and mall located near the Reisterstown Plaza Metro Subway Station. Originally built as an outdoor shopping center (with two parallel rows of stores between the original anchors Hecht's and Stewarts), it was later converted into an indoor mall, and then expanded with big box stores in an outdoor shopping area. The Reisterstown Road Plaza opened in 1962. The anchor stores are Home Depot, Five Below, Petco, Marshalls, Giant, Shoppers World, and Big Lots. There are 2 vacant anchor stores that were once Modell's Sporting Goods and Burlington.

Previous anchors at the Reisterstown Road Plaza were the now defunct chains of Stewart's/Caldor, Zayre/Ames, Hechinger, and Hecht's. Some of the stores and restaurants include Shoe City, Economy Shoes, Foot Locker, Big Lots Stores, Popeyes, Applebee's, Panda Express, KFC, Long John Silver's, and Checkers.

The Plaza also houses a satellite campus of Baltimore City Community College, CJIS, Department of Public Safety and Correctional Services, Maryland Board of Nursing and the office of vital records for the state of Maryland.

== History ==
The Plaza was one of several areas in Baltimore that saw redevelopment as a result of a nearby transit system being constructed. The nearby Metro Subway opened in 1983.

In 1986, a two-story office center at the Plaza was completed. It started out by housing the Maryland Lottery.

In 1991, the Plaza underwent a 125,000-square-foot (11,600 m^{2}) expansion

In 1997, a fire damaged a section of the Plaza. This forced the closing of Woolworths.

In 2001, Home Depot announced it would open a store in a new building behind the mall, which was itself undergoing a renovation at the time.

On March 12, 2020, it was announced that Modell's Sporting Goods would be closing all stores, including the Reisterstown Road Plaza location.
