= LocalLink 30 (BaltimoreLink) =

Bus route operated by the Maryland Transit Administration

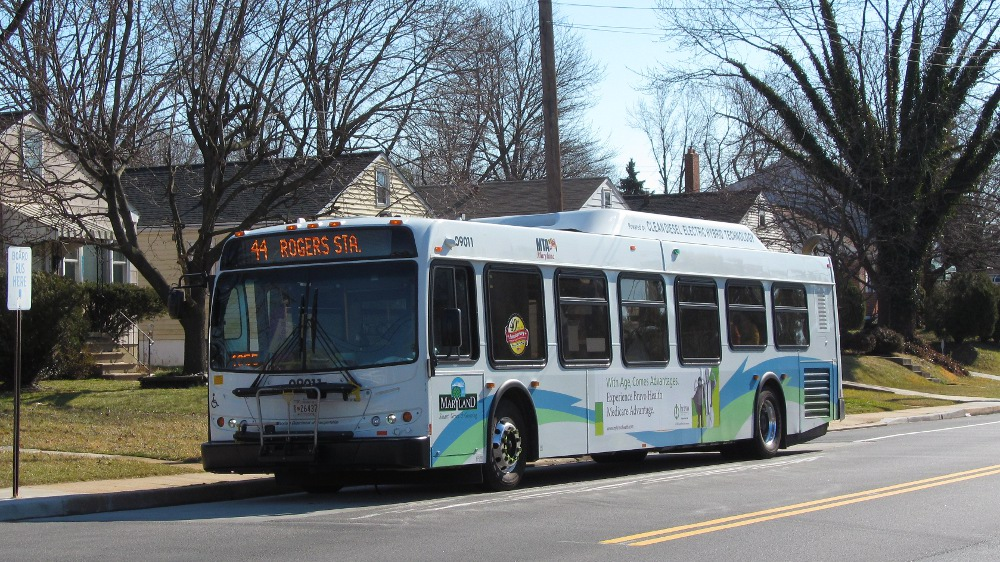

Overview
- System: Maryland Transit Administration
- Garage: Kirk; Northwest
- Status: active
- Began service: 1946
- Predecessors: Bus Route D

Route
- Locale: Baltimore City; Baltimore County
- Communities served: Woodlawn; Howard Park; Arlington; Pimlico; Roland Park; Homeland; Ramblewood; Hamilton; Gardenville
- Landmarks served: Social Security Administration headquarters Gwynn Oak Park; Pimlico Race Course; Sinai Hospital; St. Mary's Seminary; Good Samaritan Hospital
- Other routes: 1, 3, 5, 7, 8, 11, 12, 15, 19, 20, 27, 33, 35, 36, qb40, qb46, qb47, qb48, 51, 52, 53, 54, 57, 61, 77, 91, 99

Service
- Level: Daily
- Frequency: Every 20 minutes Every 15 minutes (peak)
- Weekend frequency: Every 30-60 minutes
- Operates: 4:00 am to 1:00 am

LocalLink 30 is a bus route operated by the Maryland Transit Administration in Baltimore and its suburbs. It replaced route 44 following the 2017 BaltimoreLink overhaul of the bus network. The line currently runs from Rosedale Industrial Park near Pulaski Highway just outside the Baltimore city limits on the east side of the city across the northern portion of the city to Security Square Mall, with selected peak hour trips to the Social Security Administration. Some early morning trips before 7 AM lay over at the Centers for Medicare and Medicaid Services (CMS) headquarters. The line operates mostly along Frankford Avenue, Echodale Avenue, East Belvedere Avenue, Northern Parkway, Rogers Avenue, and Gwynn Oak Avenue, serving the communities of Gardenville, Hamilton, Belvedere Park, Homeland, Roland Park, Pimlico, and Arlington, and the western suburb of Woodlawn.

== History ==
Prior to the existence of Route 44 in the 1940s, no bus route operated fully across the same parts of the city as Route 44 does today. But parts of Route 44 are the successors to the Nos. 32 and 33 Streetcar Lines and Bus Route D, which operated before Northern Parkway was built. The no. 32 Streetcar had operated along to Liberty Heights corridor to Gwynn Oak Avenue, with branches in opposite directions along Gwynn Oak to Woodlawn and Arlington. The no. 33 streetcar had operated from Gwynn Oak to Park Heights Avenue before operating downtown. Route D had operated between Pimlico and Overlea, making use of Lake Avenue between Falls Road and Charles Street, and then Belvedere, Echodale, and Frankford to Belair Road.

=== Origin ===
Route 44 started operating in 1946. The line operated during most of its existence from the Gwynn Oak Park loop (the former terminus of the no. 33 streetcar and former location of a roller coaster park during the streetcar era) in Woodlawn to the Frankford and Cedella before being extended to the Hollander Ridge housing projects in East Baltimore. Extensions have been made to accommodate new developments in the city and suburbs, including most notably, the Social Security Administration's Woodlawn headquarters, which opened in 1960.

In 1973, a new branch was added to the line, which operated to Brighton, serving the Reisterstown Road Plaza and the Cross Country community. These trips operated on weekdays and Saturdays very minimally, usually less than once an hour.

In 2000, the Hollander Ridge terminus was relocated to Rosedale Industrial Park with the demolition of the Hollander Ridge projects.

In 2005, as part of the Greater Baltimore Bus Initiative, all Gwynn Oak trips on the line were extended to Security Square Mall, as the line absorbed Route M-6, and the frequency was improved. The midday frequency was improved, and the Brighton Branch was eliminated. Though service was not provided on the exact distinct streets served by the Brighton branch, riders were within a close walk of Route M-10 (now Route 58).

There was also consideration to reroute Route 44 line to serve the Mt. Washington Light Rail Stop, but this plan was later dropped because buses would take longer to travel crosstown, and finding a route was difficult because certain left turns in the Sinai Hospital area are prohibited.

The overhaul of Route 44, which took effect on October 23, 2005, was not greeted well. Most of those who complained about the changes were upset not about any changes on Route 44, but rather about the elimination of Route M-6, which operated from the Rogers Avenue Metro Subway Station to the Security Boulevard area along a similar but variant route. These rides complained that the new combined route longer route had lower reliability, and that those on the streets that were distinctly served by Route M-6 no longer had bus service, requiring riders to walk.

MTA responded these complaints by implementing a limited number of M-6 trips in March 2006, and returning Route M-6 to full-time status on October 8 of the same year while not diminishing the Route 44's level of service. It was noted that the frequency of service between Rogers Avenue and Security would be doubled at most times.

== June 2011 ==
Service frequency was adjusted to 20 minutes and every other trip will continue to turn around at Rogers Avenue Metro Subway Station.
