= Pikesville, Maryland =

- Census-designated place
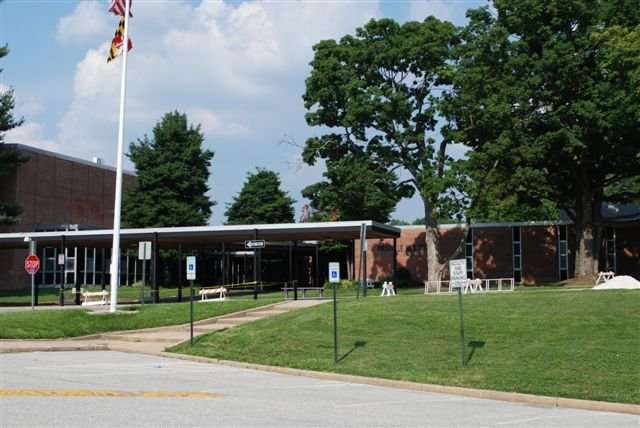
- The entrance to Pikesville High School, located at the intersection of Labyrinth Road and Smith Avenue.

- Location of Pikesville, Maryland
- Coordinates: 39°22′45″N 76°42′18″W
- Country: United States
- State: Maryland
- County: Baltimore

Area
  - Total: 12.38 sq mi (32.06 km^{2})
  - Land: 12.35 sq mi (31.99 km^{2})
  - Water: 0.027 sq mi (0.07 km^{2})
- Elevation: 509 ft (155 m)

Population (2020)
  - Total: 34,168
  - Density: 2,766.7/sq mi (1,068.21/km^{2})
- Demonym: Pikesvillian
- Time zone: UTC−5 (Eastern (EST))
  - Summer (DST): UTC−4 (EDT)
- ZIP codes: 21208, 21282,21209,21215
- Area codes: 410, 443, and 667
- FIPS code: 24-61400
- GNIS feature ID: 0586509

Pikesville is a census-designated place (CDP) in Baltimore County, Maryland, United States. Pikesville is just northwest of the Baltimore city limits. It is the northwestern suburb closest to Baltimore.

The population was 34,168 at the 2020 census. The corridor along Interstate 795, which links Pikesville, Owings Mills, and Reisterstown to the Baltimore Beltway (Interstate 695), contains one of the larger Jewish populations in Maryland.

== Geography ==
Pikesville is located at 39°22′45″N 76°42′18″W (39.379039, −76.705091).

According to the United States Census Bureau, the CDP has a total area of 32.1 square kilometres (12.4 sq mi), of which 32.0 square kilometres (12.4 sq mi) is land and 0.07 square kilometres (0.027 sq mi), or 0.22%, is water.

== Demographics ==
Historical population
Census	Pop.	Note	%±
1960	18,737		—
1970	24,159		28.9%
1980	22,555		−6.6%
1990	24,815		10.0%
2000	29,123		17.4%
2010	30,764		5.6%
2020	34,168		11.1%

=== Racial and ethnic composition ===
Pikesville CDP, Maryland – Racial and ethnic composition Note: the US Census treats Hispanic/Latino as an ethnic category. This table excludes Latinos from the racial categories and assigns them to a separate category. Hispanics/Latinos may be of any race.
Race / Ethnicity (NH = Non-Hispanic)	Pop 2000	Pop 2010	Pop 2020	% 2000	% 2010	% 2020
White alone (NH)	24,874	24,874	22,986	85.41%	85.41%	67.27%
Black or African American alone (NH)	2,455	2,455	6,511	8.43%	8.43%	19.06%
Native American or Alaska Native alone (NH)	19	19	34	0.07%	0.07%	0.10%
Asian alone (NH)	1,014	1,014	1,709	3.48%	3.48%	5.00%
Native Hawaiian or Pacific Islander alone (NH)	2	2	12	0.01%	0.01%	0.04%
Other race alone (NH)	57	57	280	0.20%	0.20%	0.82%
Mixed race or Multiracial (NH)	264	264	1,076	0.91%	0.91%	3.15%
Hispanic or Latino (any race)	438	438	1,560	1.50%	1.50%	4.57%
Total	29,123	29,123	34,168	100.00%	100.00%	100.00%

=== 2020 census ===
As of the 2020 census, Pikesville had a population of 34,168. The median age was 42.9 years. 23.2% of residents were under the age of 18 and 25.0% of residents were 65 years of age or older. For every 100 females there were 86.9 males, and for every 100 females age 18 and over there were 82.4 males age 18 and over.

98.8% of residents lived in urban areas, while 1.2% lived in rural areas.

There were 14,044 households in Pikesville, of which 27.4% had children under the age of 18 living in them. Of all households, 47.3% were married-couple households, 15.1% were households with a male householder and no spouse or partner present, and 33.4% were households with a female householder and no spouse or partner present. About 33.2% of all households were made up of individuals and 18.9% had someone living alone who was 65 years of age or older.

There were 14,948 housing units, of which 6.0% were vacant. The homeowner vacancy rate was 1.5% and the rental vacancy rate was 7.2%.

Racial composition as of the 2020 census
Race	Number	Percent
White	23,232	68.0%
Black or African American	6,602	19.3%
American Indian and Alaska Native	61	0.2%
Asian	1,715	5.0%
Native Hawaiian and Other Pacific Islander	13	0.0%
Some other race	922	2.7%
Two or more races	1,623	4.8%
Hispanic or Latino (of any race)	1,560	4.6%

=== 2010 census ===
As of the 2010 census, there were 30,764 people and 13,642 households residing in the CDP. The population density was 2,490.8 people per square mile. There were 14,323 housing units. The racial makeup of the CDP was 77.0% White, 14.5% African American, 0.1% Native American, 6.0% Asian, 0.1% Pacific Islander, and 1.6% from two or more races. Hispanic or Latino of any race were 2.7% of the population.

=== 2000 census ===
As of the 2000 census, there were 12,747 households, out of which 24.1% had children under the age of 18 living with them, 54.9% were married couples living together, 7.0% had a female householder with no husband present, and 36.1% were non-families. 30.5% of all households were made up of individuals, and 14.9% had someone living alone who was 65 years of age or older. The average household size was 2.25 and the average family size was 2.81.

In the CDP, the population was spread out, with 19.7% under the age of 18, 5.3% from 18 to 24, 24.4% from 25 to 44, 27.0% from 45 to 64, and 23.6% who were 65 years of age or older. The median age was 45 years. For every 100 females, there were 86.0 males. For every 100 females age 18 and over, there were 81.0 males.

The median income for a household in the CDP was $58,598, and the median income for a family was $78,002 (these figures had risen to $73,846 and $100,237 respectively as of a 2007 estimate). Males had a median income of $52,079 versus $37,179 for females. The per capita income for the CDP was $41,035. About 5.0% of families and 6.9% of the population were below the poverty line, including 4.4% of those under age 18 and 11.5% of those age 65 or over.

In 2000, 19.3% of Pikesville residents identified as being of Russian heritage. Virtually all of them are Ashkenazi Jews whose ancestors immigrated from the Russian Empire. In 2000, 3.7% of Pikesville residents identified as being of Ukrainian American heritage. This was the highest percentage of Ukrainian Americans of any place in Maryland. 2% of the city were descended from Eastern European countries other than Russia and Ukraine. The majority of them are of Ashkenazi Jewish ancestry. 8% of Pikesville's residents were German, 7% Polish, 4% Irish, 3% English, and 2% Italian.

=== Jewish community ===
In the 19th and early 20th centuries Jewish immigrants to the Baltimore area first formed enclaves in East Baltimore not far from Johns Hopkins Hospital in neighborhoods such as Broadway East, Jonestown, Middle East and Oliver. After World War II, the Jewish community moved outside of Baltimore City into Pikesville, a sleepy outpost on a major road that led to Western Maryland. During the Vietnam War, and exacerbated by riots in 1968, many Jewish businesses left northwestern Baltimore following this exodus.

Pikesville (and more recently its neighboring communities to the north, Owings Mills and Reisterstown) have been considered the center of the Baltimore area's Jewish community since the mid-1950s. Many of the region's largest and most established synagogues, Jewish schools, and kosher dining establishments are located in or near Pikesville.

== History ==
Pikesville, Maryland, was named for the American soldier and explorer Zebulon Pike (1779–1813). While there are places named for Pike in many other states, Pikesville, Maryland, is the only contemporary place named "Pikesville". In 1816, construction on the US arsenal began.

=== Folklore ===
Black Aggie is the colloquial name of a statue originally installed at the Druid Ridge Cemetery in Pikesville in 1926. Known for inspiring stories of hauntings, the statue was donated by the owners to the Smithsonian Institution in 1967, and was installed behind the Cutts-Madison House in Washington, D.C. Still associated with Pikesville ghost stories, local groups have advocated for the statue's return to Pikesville.

== Education ==
Pikesville is served by several elementary, middle, and high schools and higher-education facilities:

=== Public ===
All public schools in Pikesville are part of the Baltimore County Public Schools system.

- Fort Garrison Elementary School
- Milbrook Elementary
- Bedford Elementary School
- Summit Park Elementary School
- Wellwood International School (elementary)
- Winand Elementary
- Northwest Academy of Health Sciences (Formerly Old Court Middle School)
- Pikesville Middle School
- Sudbrook Magnet Middle School
- Pikesville High School
- Milford Mill Academy (Formerly Milford Mill High School)

=== Independent ===
- The Park School
- Elementary School of St. Marks
- Beth Tfiloh Dahan Community School
- The Odyssey School
- St. Timothy's School
- Krieger Schechter Day School
- Torah Institute

=== Higher education ===
- Ner Israel Rabbinical College
- Maalot Baltimore: Women's Institute of Torah Seminary

== Government ==
The Maryland State Police is headquartered at 1201 Reisterstown Road in the Pikesville CDP.

== Transportation ==
=== Roads ===
- Baltimore Beltway (I-695)
- Milford Mill Road
- Mount Wilson Lane
- Old Court Road
- Park Heights Avenue (MD-129)
- Reisterstown Road (MD-140)
- Seven Mile Lane
- Slade Avenue
- Smith Avenue
- Stevenson Road
- Sudbrook Lane/Road
- Brooks Robinson Drive

=== Public transportation ===
The Baltimore Metro Subway runs through Pikesville, with two stops in the area, both named for the roads on which they are located: Milford Mill and Old Court.

Maryland Transit Administration bus routes serving Pikesville include nos. 83 and 89 on Reisterstown Road, 83 and 37 on Old Court Road, 85 on Milford Mill Road/Slade Avenue, and 34 and on Smith Avenue.

== Notable people ==
- Sam Barsky, knitting artist
- Sam Ezersky, puzzle editor
- Dan Zanes, musician
- David Felinton, former mayor of Huntington, West Virginia
- Michael H. Shamberg, filmmaker and music video producer (True Faith, Blue Monday), raised in Pikesville.
- Robin Quivers, long-running news anchor and co-host of The Howard Stern Show, was born and raised in Pikesville.

== Pikesville in national/international news ==
Vernon Lee Evans was a key figure in the battle against lethal injection in Maryland and other states. Prior to Maryland's outlawing of capital punishment in 2013, he and Anthony Grandison were on death row for the murders of two clerks at the Warren House Motel (currently a Howard Johnson) in Pikesville in 1983. Governor Martin O'Malley commuted both men's sentences in 2014, along with those of the other two men who were, at the time, on Maryland's death row.

Ziad Jarrah, a suspected terrorist involved in the 9/11 attacks, was pulled over two days earlier for speeding in Pikesville.

On April 25, 2024, Dazhon Darien, the athletic director at Pikesville High School, was arrested on terms of falsifying an audio recording of the Principal making racist and antisemitic remarks using artificial intelligence.
