= McCormick Road station =

Light rail station in Hunt Valley, Maryland, US

McCormick Road
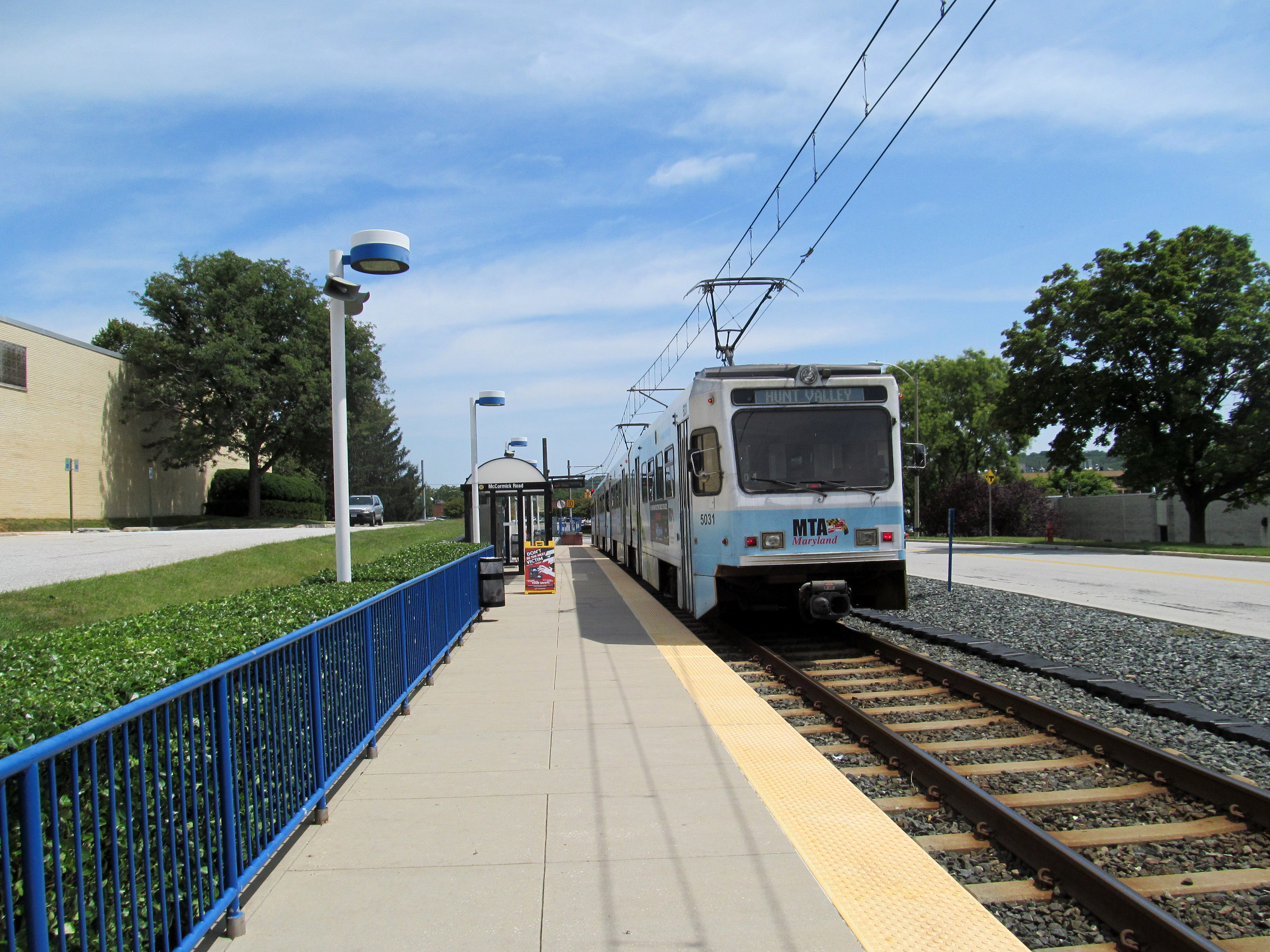
- A train at McCormick Road station in 2014

General information
- Location: 265 Schilling Circle; Hunt Valley, Maryland
- Coordinates: 39°29′22.4″N 76°39′32.3″W
- Owner: Maryland Transit Administration
- Platforms: 1 side platform
- Tracks: 1
- Connections: MTA: 9

Construction
- Accessible: Yes

History
- Opened: September 9, 1997

Passengers
- 2017: 434 daily

Services
Preceding station	Maryland Transit Administration	Following station
Gilroy Road toward BWI Airport or Glen Burnie	Light RailLink	Pepper Road toward Hunt Valley
Location

McCormick Road station is a Baltimore Light Rail station located in an industrial park in Hunt Valley, Maryland. It is named after the adjacent road, itself named for McCormick & Company, whose offices are nearby. The station was opened in 1997 as part of the system's northern extension. It has a single side platform serving a single track.
