= Lutherville station =

Light rail station in Lutherville, Maryland, US

Lutherville
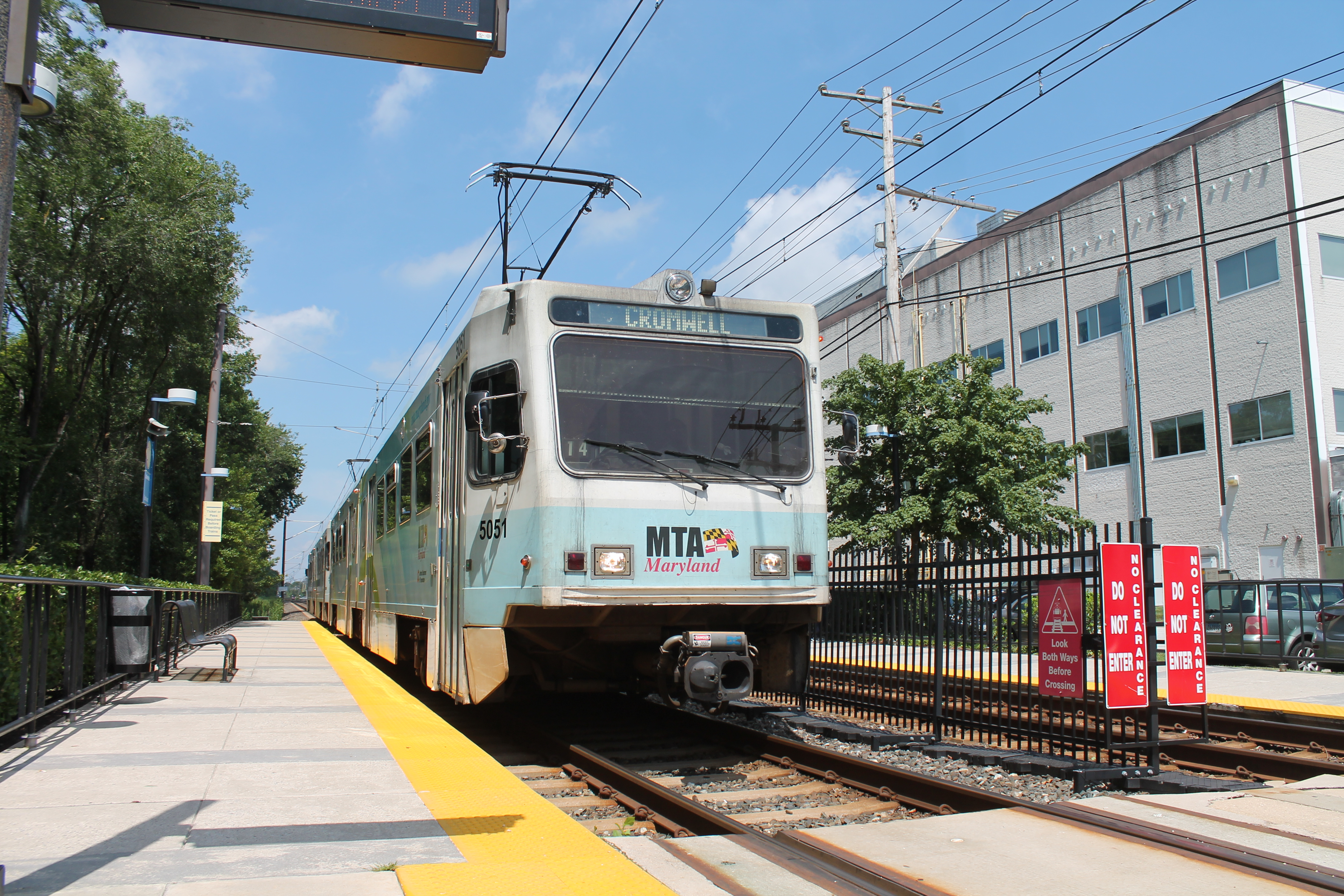
- A southbound train arriving at Lutherville in 2016

General information
- Location: 150 Ridgely Road West; Lutherville, Maryland
- Coordinates: 39.429133°N 76.62718°W
- Owner: Maryland Transit Administration
- Platforms: 2 side platforms
- Tracks: 2
- Connections: MTA: 8, 9, CityLink Red

Construction
- Parking: 329 spaces
- Cycle facilities: Yes
- Accessible: Yes

History
- Opened: April 2, 1992

Passengers
- 2017: 790 daily

Services
Preceding station	Maryland Transit Administration	Following station
Falls Road toward BWI Airport or Glen Burnie	Light RailLink	Timonium toward Hunt Valley
Location

Lutherville station is a Baltimore Light Rail station located in Lutherville, Maryland. Like most suburban stations on the system, it has two side platforms serving the line's two tracks. It opened in 1992 as part of the initial operating segment.

== History ==
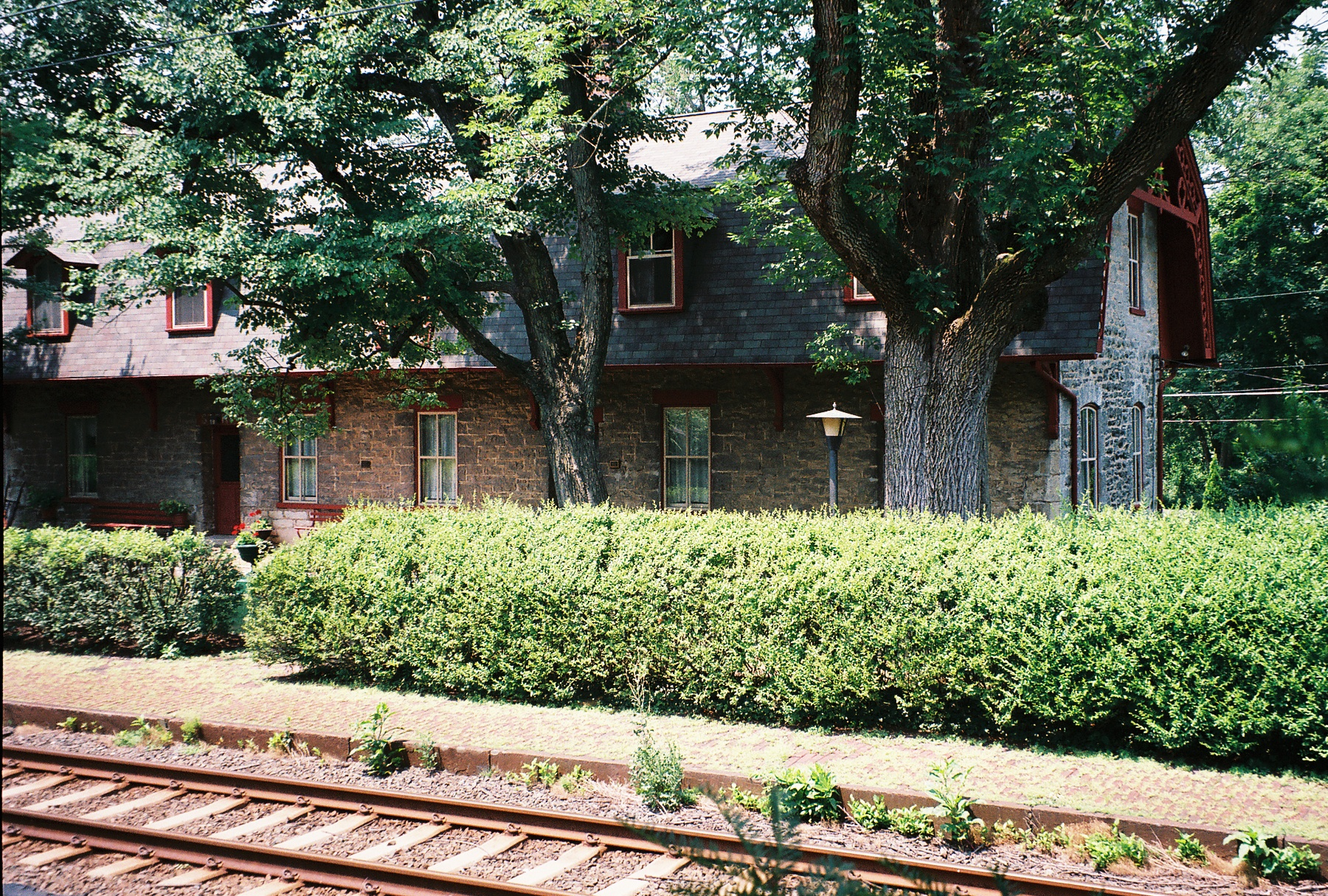
The former Lutherville station in 2009

The Northern Central Railway stopped at Lutherville until local services ceased around 1959. The former station building is still extant.

Prior to the opening of the light rail system, the current parking lot was a park-and-ride lot with express bus service. The gap between Lutherville and Falls Road, the previous station to the south, is one of the longest on the Light Rail line due to opposition from the residents of Ruxton and Riderwood to stations being built in their communities.

In July 2009, two teenage boys were struck by a light rail train near Lutherville station. The boys were likely unaware of single-tracking, which caused a train to come from the opposite direction than they would have expected. Two operators were fired and six other employees disciplined in December 2009, but it remained unclear whether the deaths could have been prevented by the operators following proper procedures. MTA instituted new regulations pertaining to trespassing on light rail tracks as a result of the deaths. These include strictly enforcing the existing trespassing laws, alerting police immediately if someone is spotted on or near the light rail tracks, and enforcing speed regulations on trains until the trespasser is removed.
