= Timonium station =

Light rail station in Timonium, Maryland, US

Timonium
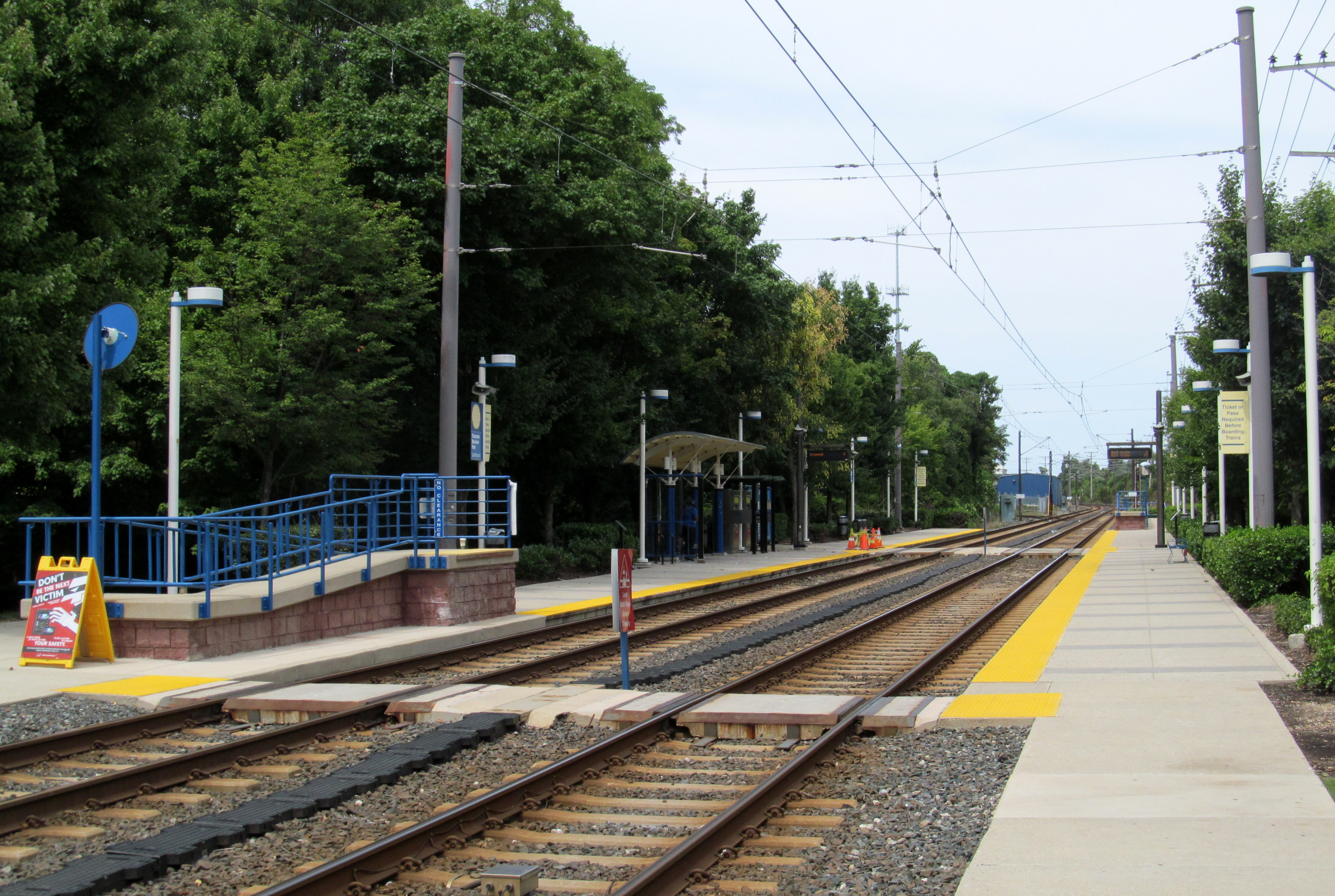
- The station in August 2014

General information
- Location: 60 Business Park Drive; Timonium, Maryland
- Coordinates: 39.43425°N 76.62820°W
- Owner: Maryland Transit Administration
- Platforms: 2 side platforms
- Tracks: 2
- Connections: MTA: 9

Construction
- Accessible: Yes

History
- Opened: April 2, 1992
- Former names: Timonium Business Park (1992–2017)

Passengers
- 2017: 310 daily

Services
Preceding station	Maryland Transit Administration	Following station
Lutherville toward BWI Airport or Glen Burnie	Light RailLink	Fairgrounds toward Hunt Valley
Location

Timonium station (formerly Timonium Business Park station) is a Baltimore Light RailLink station in Timonium, Maryland. It opened as part of the system's initial operating segment in 1992. The station originally had a parking lot which was later removed. It has two side platforms serving two tracks.
