= Warren Road station =

Light rail station in Cockeysville, Maryland, US

Warren Road
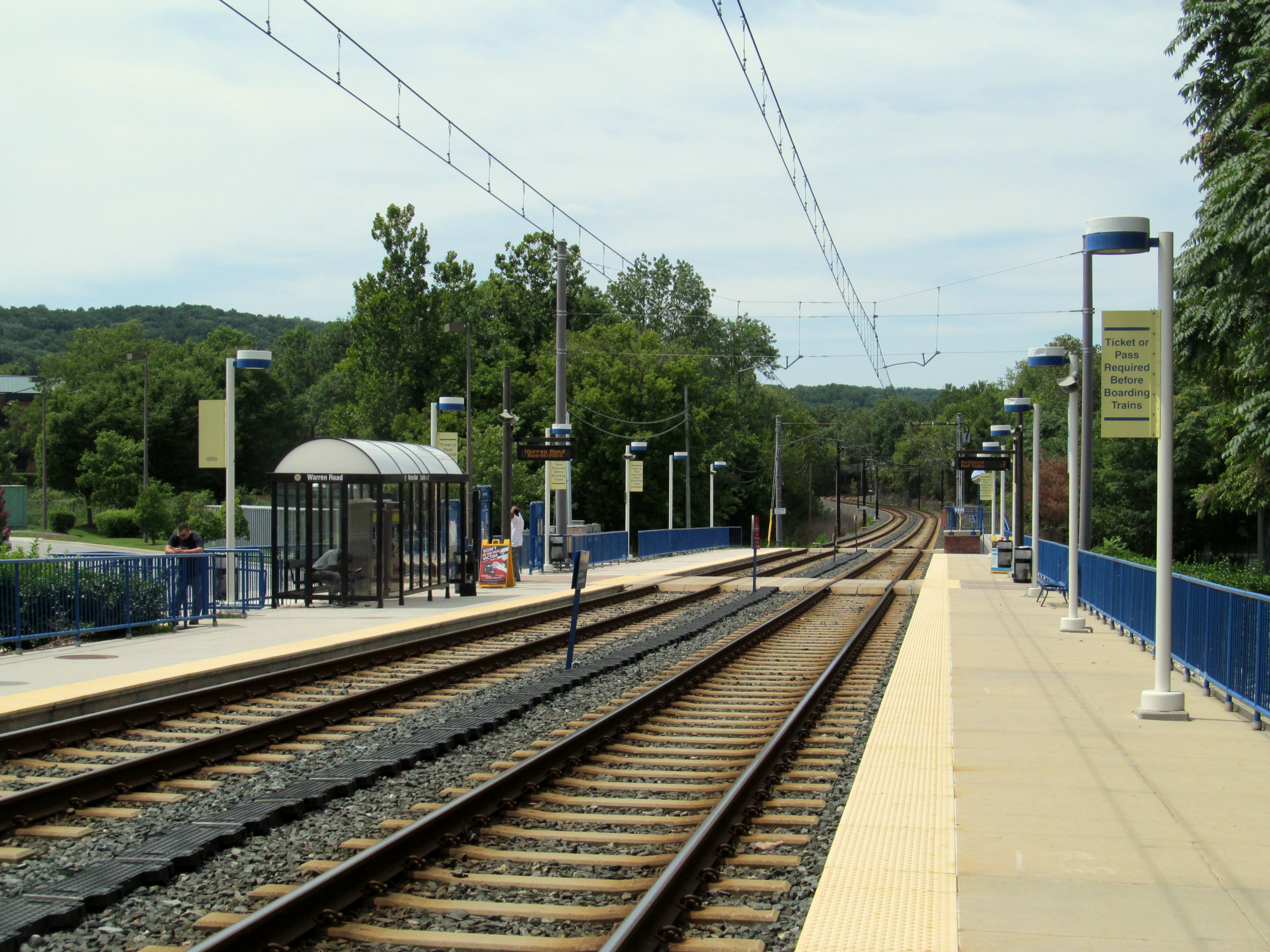
- Warren Road station in August 2014

General information
- Location: 202 Warren Road; Cockeysville, Maryland
- Coordinates: 39°28′33.2″N 76°39′13.2″W
- Owner: Maryland Transit Administration
- Platforms: 2 side platforms
- Tracks: 2

Construction
- Accessible: Yes

History
- Opened: September 9, 1997

Passengers
- 2017: 276 daily

Services
Preceding station	Maryland Transit Administration	Following station
Fairgrounds toward BWI Airport or Glen Burnie	Light RailLink	Gilroy Road toward Hunt Valley
Location

Warren Road station is a Baltimore Light Rail station located off Warren Road in Cockeysville, Maryland. The station opened in 1997 as part of the system's northern extension. It has two side platforms serving two tracks.
