= Linthicum station =

Baltimore Light Rail station in Linthicum, Maryland

Linthicum
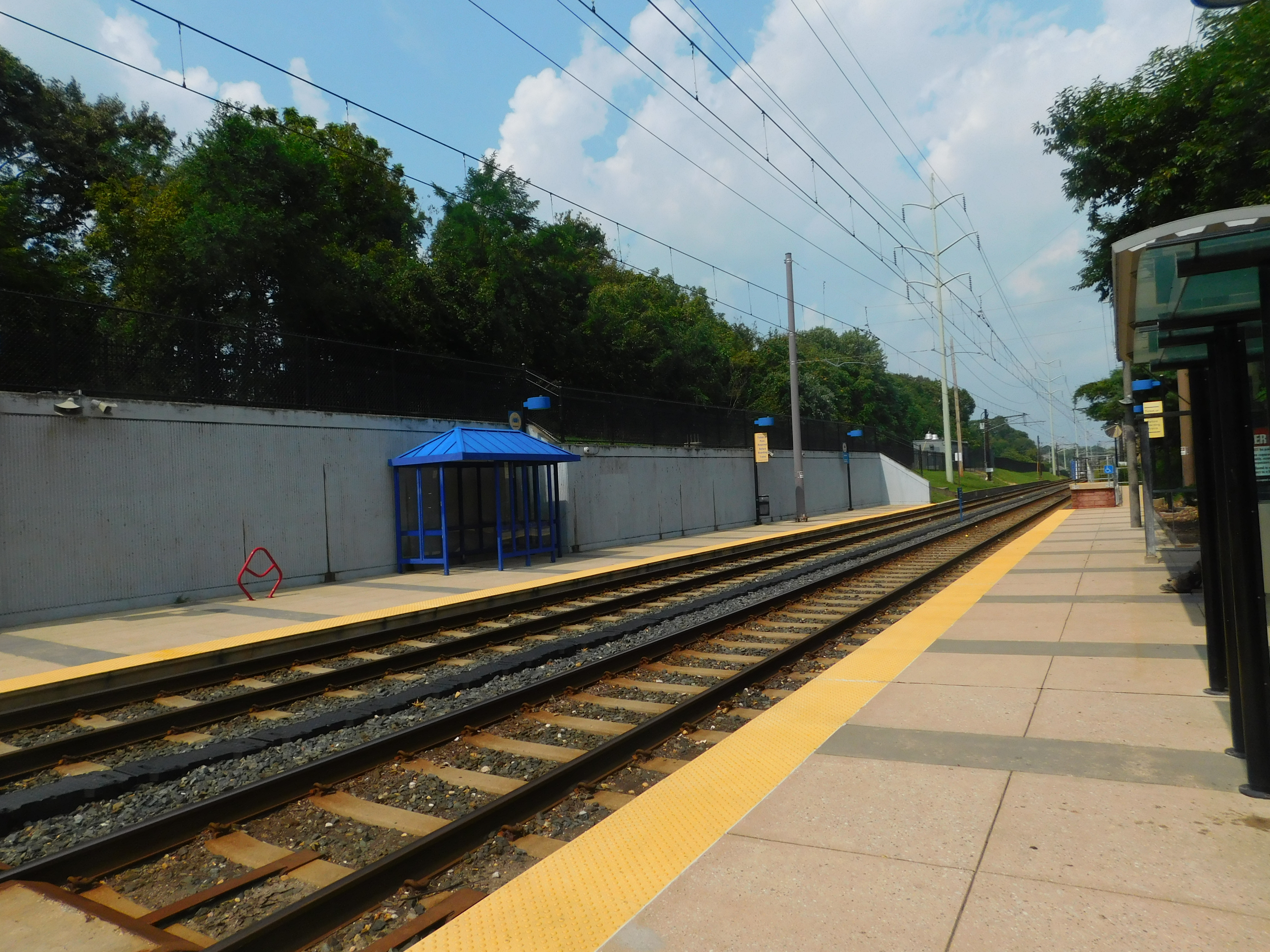
- Linithicum station in August 2018.

General information
- Location: 595 Camp Meade Road; Linthicum Heights, Maryland 21090
- Coordinates: 39°12′8.4″N 76°39′19.3″W
- Owner: Maryland Transit Administration
- Platforms: 2 side platforms
- Tracks: 2
- Connections: BWI Trail

Construction
- Accessible: Yes

History
- Opened: 1887 (B&A Railroad) as Shipley station
- Rebuilt: 1993

Passengers
- 2017: 443 daily

Services
Preceding station	Maryland Transit Administration	Following station
BWI Business District toward BWI Airport	Light RailLink	North Linthicum toward Hunt Valley
Ferndale toward Glen Burnie	Light RailLink	North Linthicum toward Hunt Valley
Location

Linthicum station is a Baltimore Light Rail station in Linthicum Heights, Maryland. This station is the last station on the light rail's trunk line; southbound trains depart onto branches to BWI Marshall Airport station and Glen Burnie station. There is currently no free public parking or bus connections at this station.

Linthicum station uses a railroad line formerly served by the Baltimore and Annapolis Railroad. It is accessible from a long crosswalk across from the intersection of Camp Meade Road (MD 170) and Benton Avenue, and the Linthicum Volunteer Fire Company (Station #32). Another crosswalk to the station leads to Oakdale Road on the opposite side of the tracks. The station reopened again in 1993, and the spur to Marshall Airport was created in 1997.

Ridership at the station averages 372 people daily, 67% of whom are transfers to either BWI Airport or Glen Burnie station. Only 33% of riders are "walk-ups" from the surrounding neighborhood, according to a 2011-2012 study funded by the MTA.

There is an effort to close this station due to the crime the station is alleged to bring to its community, including an attempted murder. While MTA has not considered closing the station, other actions have been taken or considered. These include the placement of a call box where riders can alert police when in need, additional security cameras, and the early closing of the station at 8 pm. Early attempts to have this stop closed date back to 1994.

== Station layout ==
Side platform
Southbound	← Light RailLink toward BWI Airport (BWI Business District) ← Light RailLink toward Glen Burnie (Ferndale)
Northbound	Light RailLink toward Fairgrounds or Hunt Valley (Nursery Road) →
Side platform
