= Gilroy Road station =

Light rail station in Hunt Valley, Maryland, US

Gilroy Road
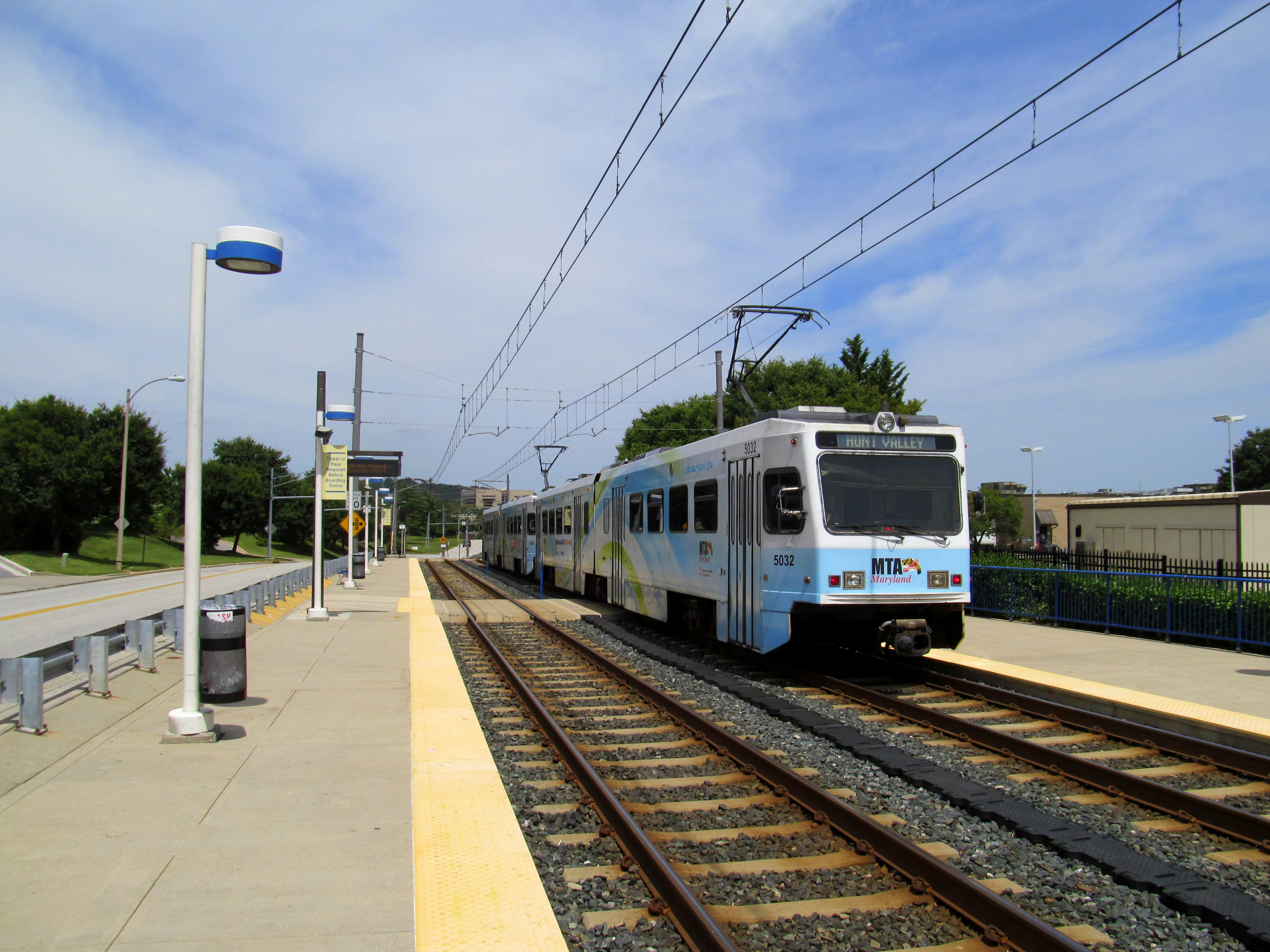
- A northbound train at Gilroy Road station in August 2014

General information
- Location: 10903 Gilroy Road; Hunt Valley, Maryland
- Coordinates: 39°28′54.67″N 76°39′42.92″W
- Owner: Maryland Transit Administration
- Platforms: 2 side platforms
- Tracks: 2

Construction
- Accessible: Yes

History
- Opened: September 9, 1997

Passengers
- 2017: 223 daily

Services
Preceding station	Maryland Transit Administration	Following station
Warren Road toward BWI Airport or Glen Burnie	Light RailLink	McCormick Road toward Hunt Valley
Location

Gilroy Road station is a Baltimore Light Rail station located in an industrial park in Hunt Valley, Maryland. It opened in 1997 as part of the system's northern extension. The station has two side platforms serving two tracks.
