= Ferndale station =

Ferndale
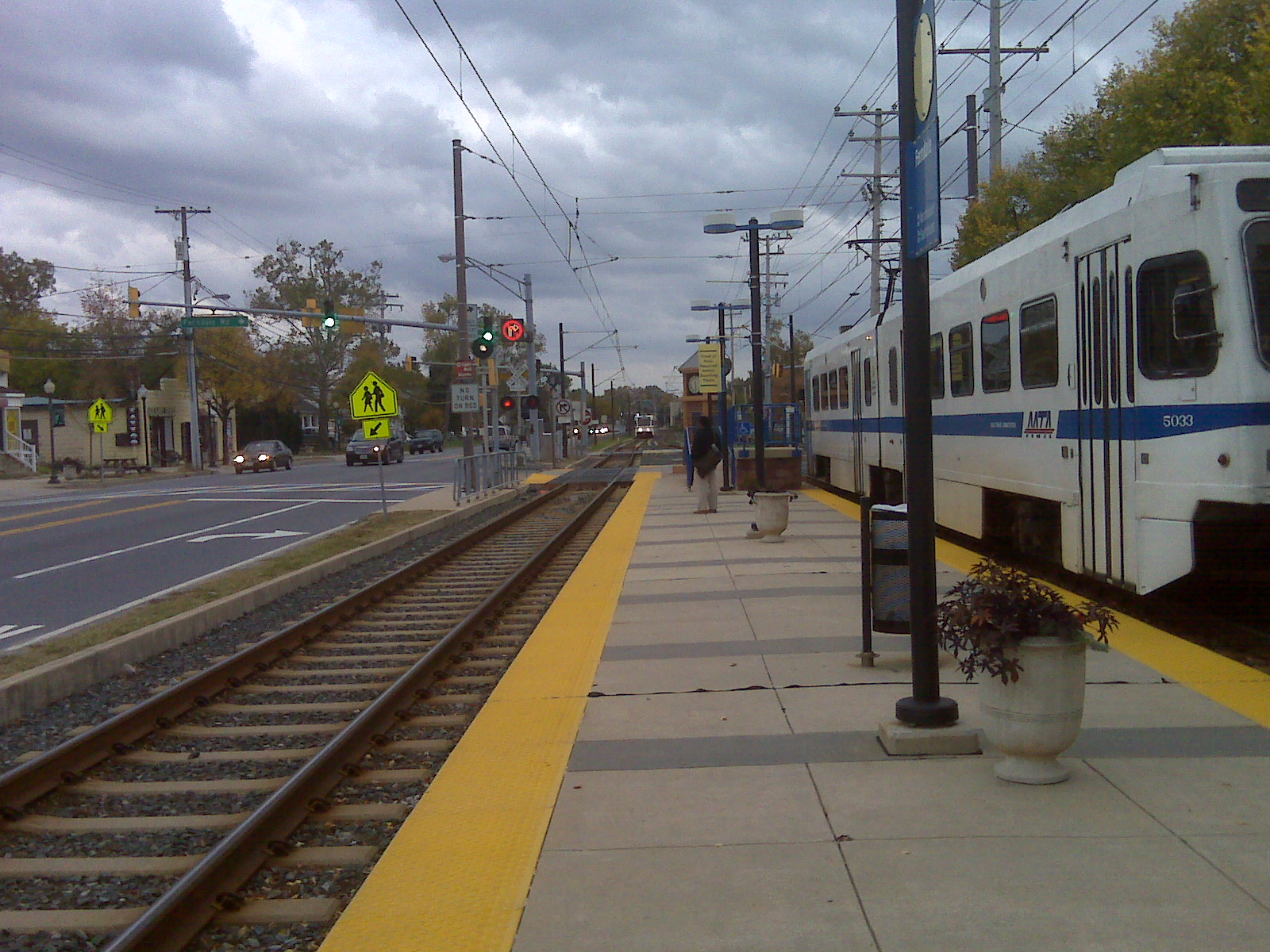
- Ferndale station in 2010

General information
- Location: 10 Broadview Boulevard; Glen Burnie, Maryland
- Coordinates: 39°11′1.5″N 76°38′24.7″W
- Owner: Maryland Transit Administration
- Platforms: 1 island platform
- Tracks: 2

Construction
- Accessible: Yes

History
- Opened: 1887 (B&A Railroad as Wellham station)
- Rebuilt: 1993

Passengers
- 2017: 93 daily

Services
Preceding station	Maryland Transit Administration	Following station
Glen Burnie Terminus	Light RailLink	Linthicum toward Hunt Valley
Location

Ferndale station is a Baltimore Light Rail station in Glen Burnie, Maryland. Northbound trains depart for Fairgrounds, continuing on at off-peak hours to Hunt Valley; southbound trains depart for Glen Burnie. There is currently no free public parking or bus connections at this station.

Ferndale is located on 10 Broadview Boulevard across from Ferndale Road. An extension of Ferndale Road crosses the tracks from Baltimore-Annapolis Boulevard (MD 648), but only runs one way westbound. A local firehouse is also located near the station, and has a private access road to Route 648 that crosses the tracks.

The station itself is the least used station in all of the Baltimore Light Rail network with 93 exits/entries in 2017.

== Station layout ==
Southbound	← Light RailLink toward Glen Burnie (Terminus)
Island platform
Northbound	Light RailLink toward Fairgrounds or Hunt Valley (Linthicum) →
