= North Avenue station (Light RailLink) =

Light rail station in Baltimore, Maryland, US

North Avenue
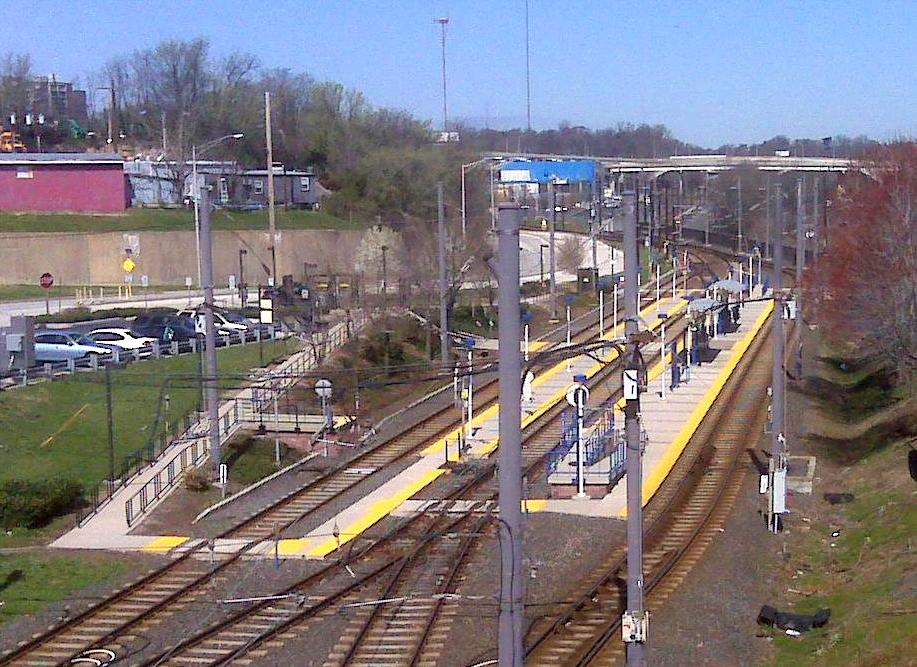
- North Avenue station in 2010

General information
- Location: 325 West North Avenue; Baltimore, Maryland
- Coordinates: 39°18′42.8″N 76°37′21.4″W
- Owner: Maryland Transit Administration
- Platforms: 2 island platforms
- Tracks: 3
- Connections: 13

Construction
- Parking: 37 free spaces
- Cycle facilities: Yes
- Accessible: Yes

History
- Opened: April 2, 1992

Passengers
- 2017: 932 daily

Services
Preceding station	Maryland Transit Administration	Following station
Mt. Royal/MICA toward BWI Airport or Glen Burnie	Light RailLink	Woodberry toward Hunt Valley
Location

North Avenue station is a Baltimore Light Rail station located on North Avenue (US 1) near the I-83 interchange in Baltimore, Maryland. The station has two island platforms serving three tracks.

During the light rail's double-tracking project, when the northern section of the system was closed, the North Avenue stop was the northern terminus. The station is the final stop on train headed for the nearby maintenance facility.

== Murder case ==
On November 7, 2006, a 17-year-old girl was murdered after she got off a train at the North Avenue stop in a highly publicized case that highlighted light rail safety. Two teenagers were charged for the crime, which took place during an attempt to rob the victim and her brother. A girl, 16, was sentenced to 25 years in adult prison, while a boy, 15, was tried as an adult but later transferred to juvenile court for sentencing.
