= Baltimore Arena station =

Light rail station in Baltimore, Maryland, US

Baltimore Arena
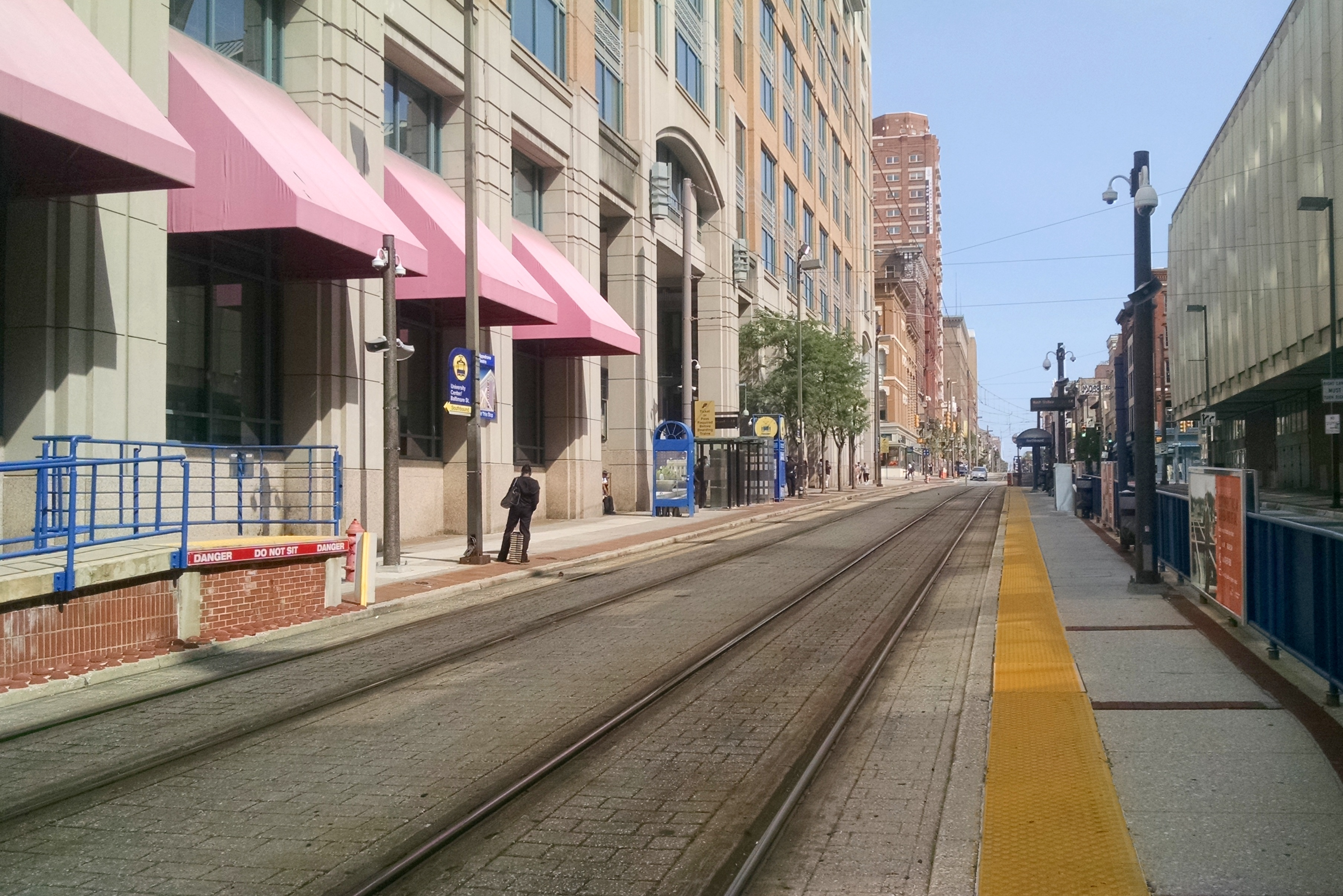
- Baltimore Arena station in August 2014

General information
- Location: 12 South Howard Street, Baltimore, Maryland
- Coordinates: 39°17′19.7″N 76°37′10″W
- Owner: Maryland Transit Administration
- Platforms: 2 side platforms
- Tracks: 2
- Connections: MTA Bus: 1, 3, 5, 7, 8, 10, 19, 20, 27, 35, 36, 40, 46, 48, 91, 120, 150, 160, 310, 320, 410, 411, 420

Construction
- Parking: No
- Accessible: Yes

History
- Opened: April 2, 1992
- Former names: University Center/Baltimore Street (1992–2017)

Passengers
- 2017: 2,211 daily

Services
Preceding station	Maryland Transit Administration	Following station
Convention Center toward BWI Airport or Glen Burnie	Light RailLink	Lexington Market toward Hunt Valley
Convention Center toward Camden Yards	Light RailLink Penn–Camden Shuttle	Lexington Market toward Penn Station
Location

Baltimore Arena station (formerly University Center/Baltimore Street station) is a Baltimore Light RailLink station in Baltimore, Maryland adjacent to the CFG Bank Arena.
