= Pepper Road station =

Light rail station in Maryland, United States

Pepper Road
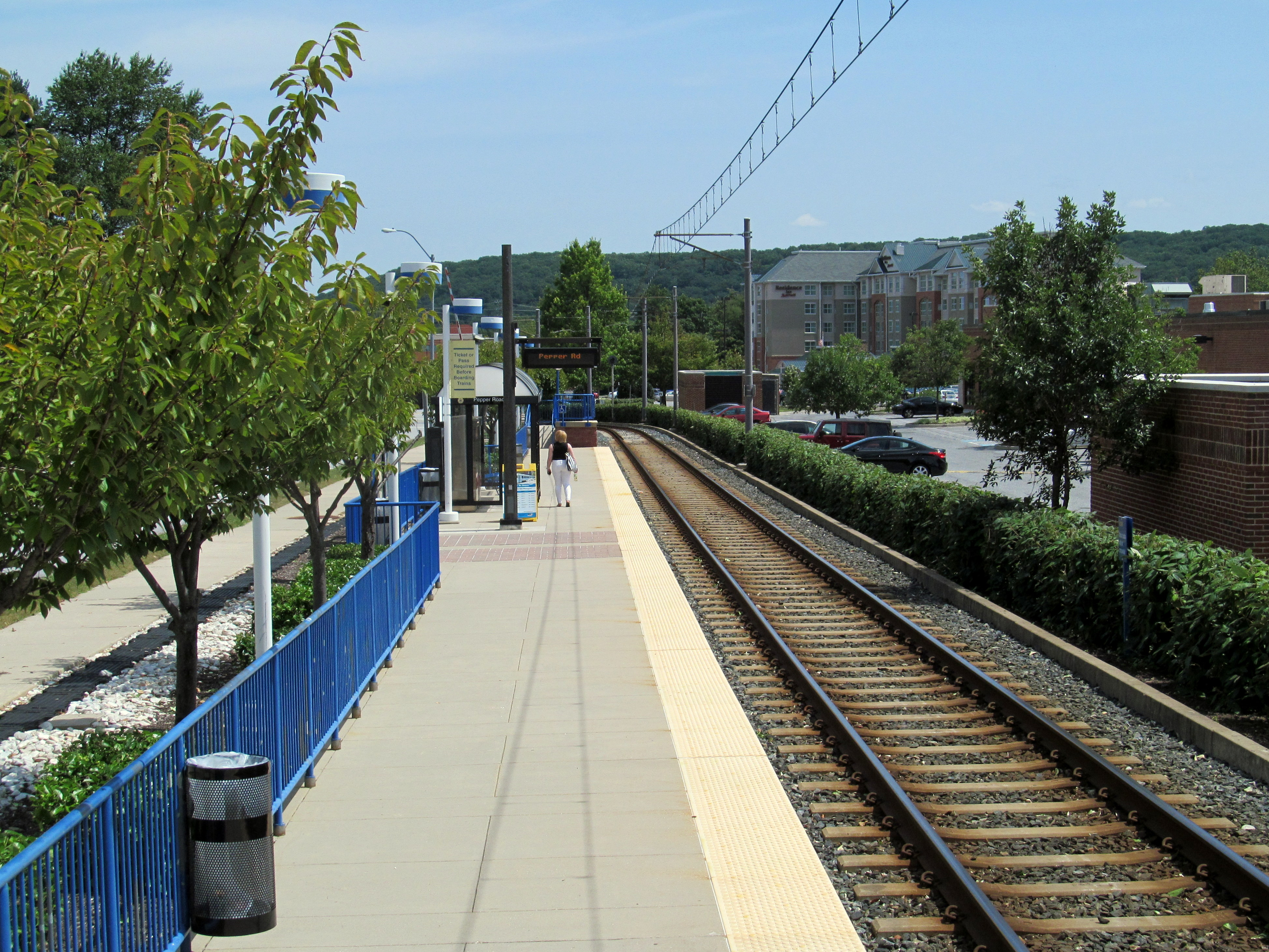
- Pepper Road station in August 2014

General information
- Location: 11101 Schilling Road; Hunt Valley, Maryland
- Coordinates: 39°29′31.7″N 76°39′22.4″W
- Owner: Maryland Transit Administration
- Platforms: 1 side platform
- Tracks: 1

Construction
- Accessible: Yes

History
- Opened: September 9, 1997

Passengers
- 2017: 158 daily

Services
Preceding station	Maryland Transit Administration	Following station
McCormick Road toward BWI Airport or Glen Burnie	Light RailLink	Hunt Valley Terminus
Location

Pepper Road station is a Baltimore Light Rail station located in an industrial park in Hunt Valley, Maryland. The station opened in 1997 as part of the system's northern extension. It has a single side platform serving a single track.
