= Convention Center station (Light RailLink) =

Train stop in Baltimore, Maryland, US

Convention Center
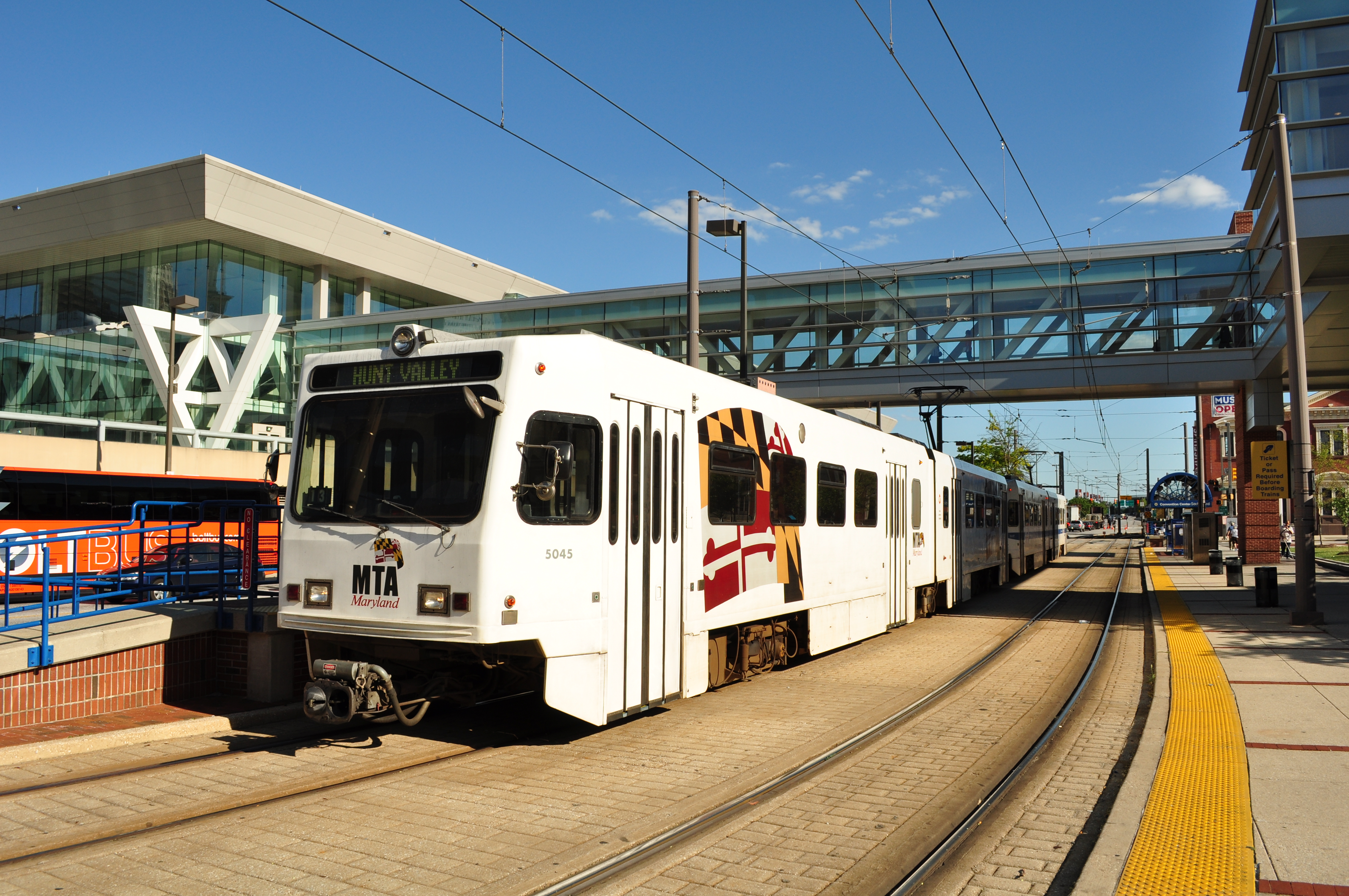
- A northbound train at Convention Center station

General information
- Location: 200 South Howard Street Baltimore, Maryland
- Coordinates: 39.28594°N 76.61934°W
- Owner: Maryland Transit Administration
- Platforms: 2 side platforms
- Tracks: 2
- Connections: 3, 7, 10, 11, 14, 19, 27, 35, 120, 160, 210, 320, 410, 411, 420; UMBC Transit: Downtown Route

Construction
- Parking: Street
- Cycle facilities: Bike Share Stop #13 (12 docks)
- Accessible: Yes

History
- Opened: April 2, 1992

Passengers
- 2017: 1,009 daily

Services
Preceding station	Maryland Transit Administration	Following station
Camden Yards toward BWI Airport or Glen Burnie	Light RailLink	Baltimore Arena toward Hunt Valley
Camden Yards Terminus	Light RailLink Penn–Camden Shuttle	Baltimore Arena toward Penn Station
Location

Convention Center station is a Baltimore Light Rail station in Baltimore, Maryland. It is located adjacent to the Baltimore Convention Center, and is also near the entrance to Oriole Park at Camden Yards. The Convention Center stop was originally called Pratt Street after the cross street by that name.

On July 10, 2019, the northbound accessible platform segment fell into a sinkhole caused by a broken water main. The incident caused the line to be closed between Camden and North Avenue until August 19.
