= Falls Road station =

Light Rail station in Towson, Maryland, US

Falls Road
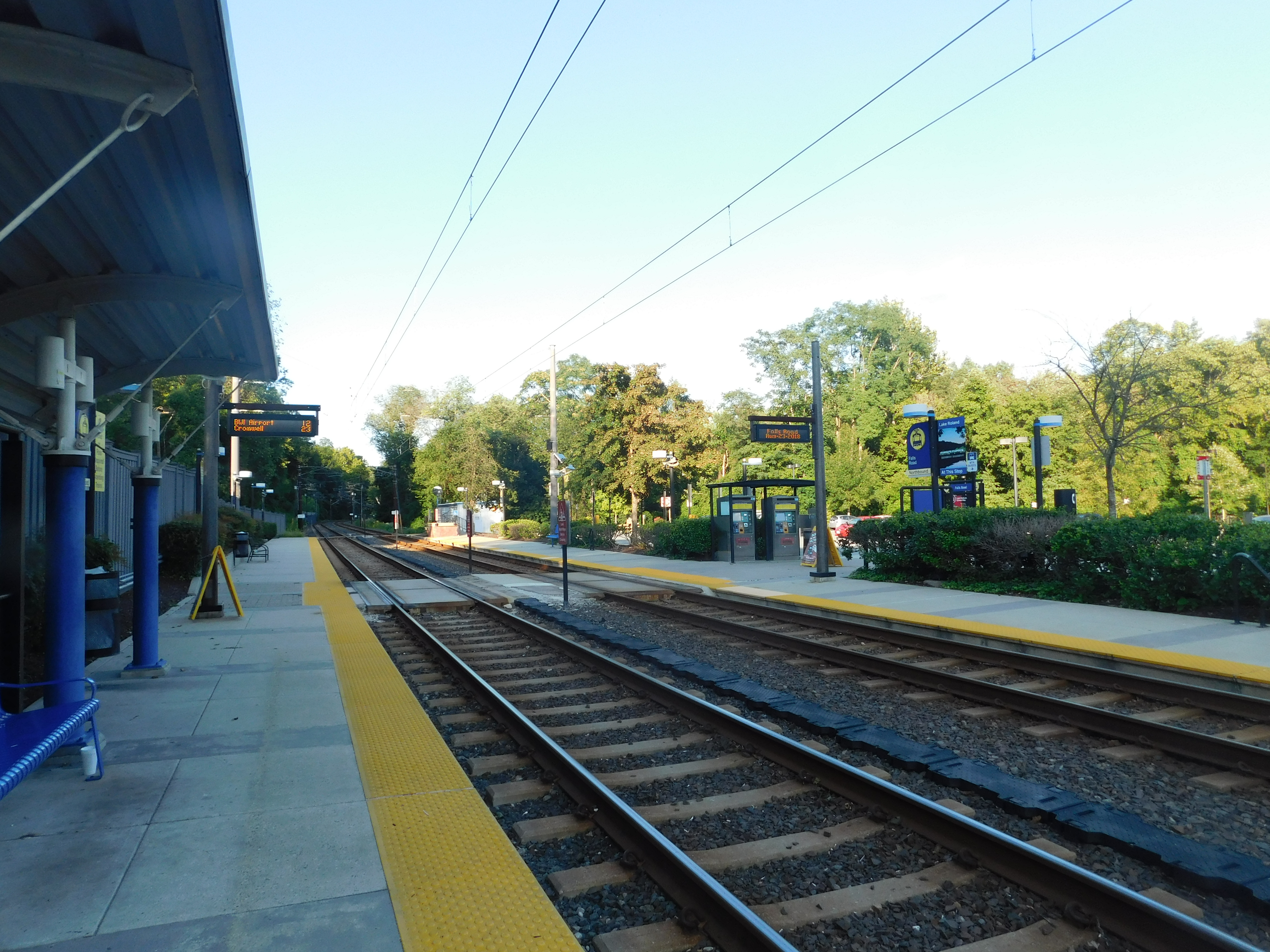
- Falls Road station in August 2018

General information
- Location: 6101A Falls Road, Towson, Maryland
- Coordinates: 39.3767°N 76.6497°W
- Owner: Maryland Transit Administration
- Platforms: 2 side platforms
- Tracks: 2
- Connections: 60

Construction
- Parking: 110 free spaces
- Accessible: Yes

History
- Opened: April 2, 1992

Passengers
- 2017: 412 daily

Services
Preceding station	Maryland Transit Administration	Following station
Mt. Washington toward BWI Airport or Glen Burnie	Light RailLink	Lutherville toward Hunt Valley
Location

Falls Road station is a Baltimore Light Rail station in the southwest corner of Towson, Maryland, located near the Mount Washington neighborhood of Baltimore and the Bare Hills Historic District in the Jones Falls Valley. It has two side platforms serving two tracks, one in each direction. A 0.3 mile boardwalk provides access from the parking lot to neighboring Lake Roland Park.

== History ==
The stop is built near the location of the former Bare Hills station on the defunct Northern Central Railway, which ran south from Harrisburg, Pennsylvania, to Baltimore until the mid-1950s. Much of the former NCR corridor between Baltimore and York is now occupied by the Torrey C. Brown Rail Trail and Jones Falls Trail, while Interstate 83 now provides the main transit corridor between the two cities. A northwestern spur line of the Western Maryland Railway ran nearby past Lake Roland towards Westminster in the late 19th century.
