= BWI Business District station =

Baltimore Light Rail station in Linthicum, Maryland

BWI Business District
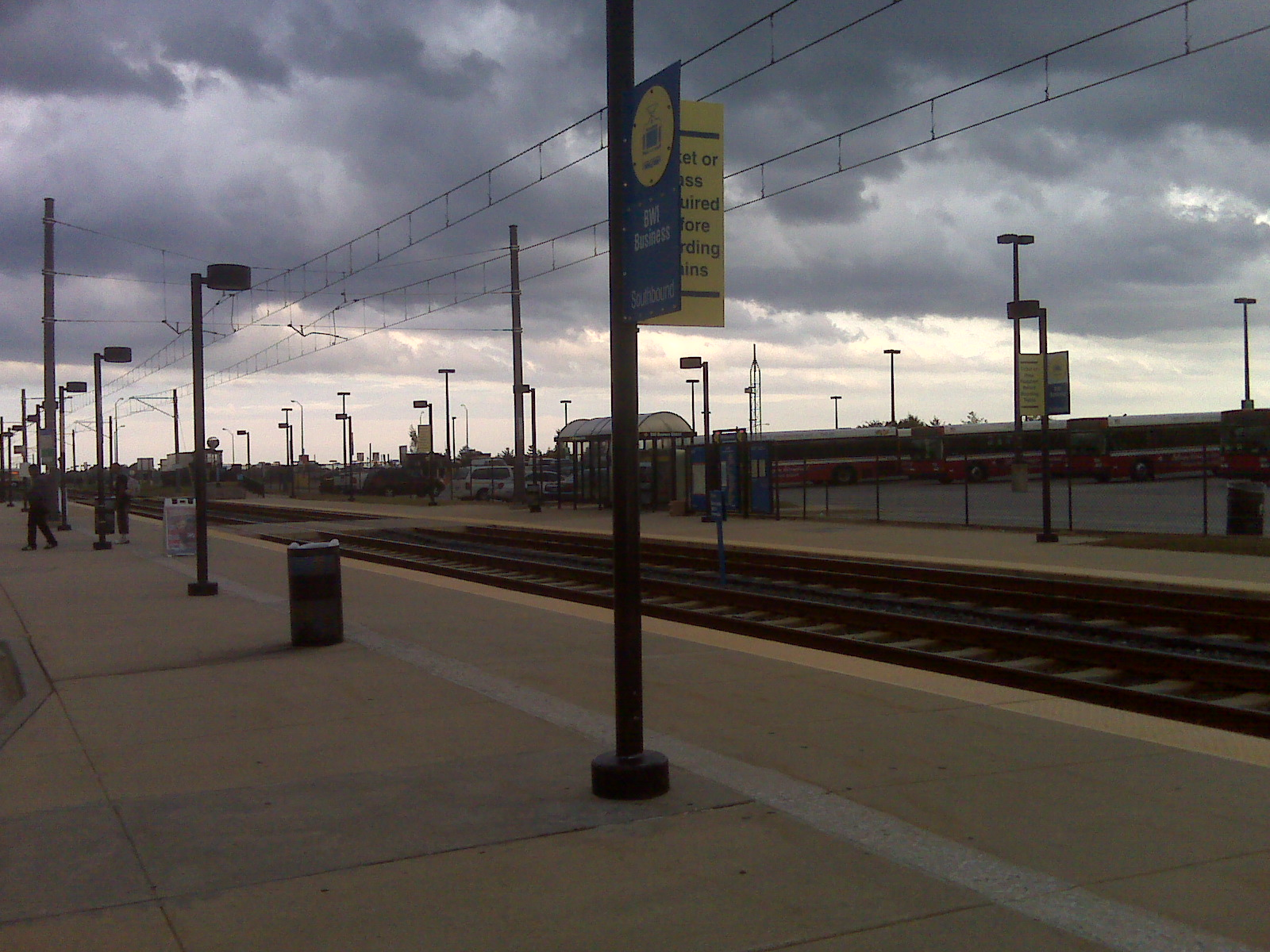
- BWI Business District station in 2010

General information
- Location: 678 Elkridge Landing Road; Linthicum, Maryland
- Coordinates: 39°11′29.1″N 76°40′23.6″W
- Owner: Maryland Transit Administration
- Platforms: 2 side platforms
- Tracks: 2
- Connections: MTA Bus 17, MTA Bus 99; RTA 501/Silver; BWI Business Partnership LINK Shuttle; UMBC-BWI Line; Baltimore & Annapolis Trail; BWI Trail

Construction
- Parking: 36 free spaces
- Cycle facilities: Yes
- Accessible: Yes

History
- Opened: 1997

Passengers
- 2017: 204 daily

Services
Preceding station	Maryland Transit Administration	Following station
BWI Airport Terminus	Light RailLink	Linthicum toward Hunt Valley
Location

BWI Business District station is a Baltimore Light Rail station in the BWI Business District, north of the Baltimore-Washington International Airport in Linthicum, Maryland. There are currently 36 free public parking spaces and connections can be made to MTA Maryland's Route 17 and 99 buses, and Howard Transit's Silver Route from this station. Additionally, portions of the BWI Trail can be found across the street from the parking lot.

== Station layout ==
G
G	Side platform
G	Southbound	← Light RailLink toward BWI Airport (Terminus)
G	Northbound	Light RailLink toward Hunt Valley (Linthicum) →
G	Side platform
G	Street level	Exit/entrance, buses, parking
