= Hunt Valley Towne Centre =

Outdoor shopping mall in suburban Baltimore, Maryland, U.S.

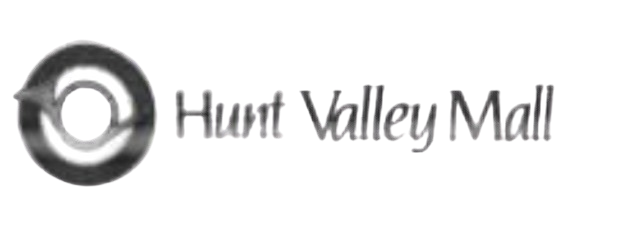
- Location: Cockeysville, Maryland
- Coordinates: 39.4211°N 76.6407°W
- Address: 118 Shawan Rd, Cockeysville, MD 21030
- Opened: September 1981; 45 years ago (reopened 2003 as Hunt Valley Towne Centre)
- Renovated: 2000 as Hunt Valley Towne Centre
- Closed: 2000; 26 years ago (original mall)
- Demolished: 2000 (original mall)
- Previous names: Hunt Valley Mall (1981–2000)
- Developer: Myles H. Tanenbaum and The Kravco Company
- Manager: Greenberg Gibbons
- Owner: Greenberg Gibbons
- Architect: RTKL Associates
- Num. of anchor tenants: 4
- Floors: 2
- Website: shophuntvalley.com

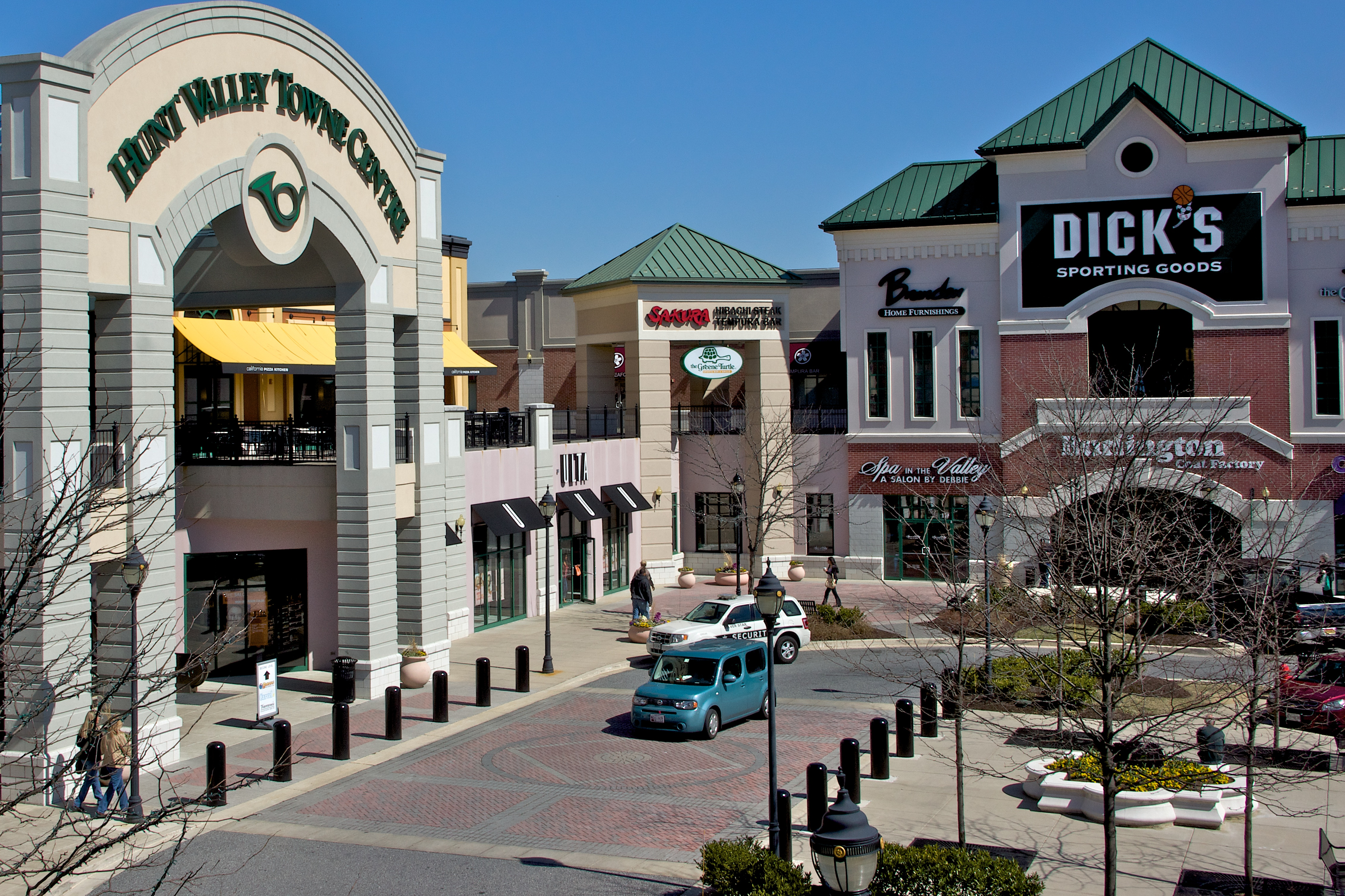
Hunt Valley Towne Centre in Hunt Valley, Maryland

Hunt Valley Towne Centre, formerly Hunt Valley Mall, is an outdoor shopping mall in Hunt Valley, Maryland, with 58 stores. The development was constructed following the closure of Hunt Valley Mall (other than its anchor stores) in 2000. The new centre started operating in 2003. The anchor stores in existence today include Dick's Sporting Goods, Burlington Coat Factory and Wegmans. Wal-Mart was located at Hunt Valley mall until late October 2007, when it moved two miles south to Cockeysville, Maryland. It was replaced by Best Buy, which closed in May 2012 as part of a nationwide downsizing. Near a gazebo located in the main street area of the center, there is a memorial to Chuck Thompson. Hunt Valley's official mascot was Hunter the Valley Bear prior to redevelopment.

== Hunt Valley Mall ==
Hunt Valley Mall was planned as early as 1979, but its construction was opposed both by local residents, citing spreading suburbification and the potential for runoff into Loch Raven Reservoir, and by the Baltimore County government, who preferred that development be focused in Owings Mills and White Marsh. Despite this, and the Baltimore County executive at the time, Donald Hutchinson, refusing to attend the opening ceremony, the mall opened on September 17, 1981. It was developed by Myles H. Tanenbaum and Kravco Company of King of Prussia, PA, and designed by Leonard Kagan (the "L" in RTKL Associates). Some of Hunt Valley's "sister malls" were Valley Hills Mall, Beachwood Place, Collin Creek Mall, White Marsh Mall, Charleston Town Center and Stratford Square Mall, after which it was modeled. The mall had space for four anchor tenants, but Sears and Bamberger's, which became Macy's in 1986, were the only ones to open, leading the mall to a fate that paralleled Seaview Square Mall in Ocean Township, New Jersey. Other major department stores were in negotiations with the mall, such as Hutzler's, which was slated for the location across from the food court, and JCPenney.

Hunt Valley Mall's non-anchor stores included Hair Cuttery, Chess King, CVS, Piercing Pagoda, Kay Bee Toys, Sun Coast Video, Listening Booth Music, Florsheim Shoes, Hess Woman's Apparel, Art Explosion, Merry Go Round, Hudson Trail Outfitters, Deb, Paul Harris, The Wild Pair, Sir Walter Raleigh Inn and others. There were two sets of escalators as well as a prominent glass elevator at the center of the mall surrounded by a fountain. Formerly the Hunt Valley mall, the space was re-established into what is current day Hunt Valley Town Centre. Small zigzag-shaped waterfalls were at opposite ends of the mall. When Macy's closed, the building was subdivided into Dick's Sporting Goods and Burlington Coat Factory on the upper and lower floors, respectively. The passenger elevator, freight elevator, and escalators inside the store space were removed prior to the stores moving in (one of the escalators was kept and reused). Once they did, the stairs at the rear mall entrance were replaced with escalators, which remained in place after redevelopment. Burlington takes up the entirety of the Macy's building's second floor.

=== Decline and closure ===
Hunt Valley Mall never recovered from its inauspicious opening. Its success over the following two decades was limited, and as a result, many of the merchants failed by the end of the 1990s. Competition from the new White Marsh Mall, as well as Golden Ring Mall, Owings Mills Mall, Towson Town Center and The Mall in Columbia did not help matters either. This resulted in plans being made to convert the mall into an outdoor town center with big-box stores. WalMart opened during this period, taking up the second floor of the Macy's building next to Dick's. The mall finally closed in 2000, and demolition began to turn the former mall site into Hunt Valley Town Centre.

== Hunt Valley Town Centre ==
Hunt Valley Town Centre opened in 2003.

In October 2007, WalMart relocated two miles south to Cockeysville. The space was then occupied by Best Buy but closed in May 2012. Bob's Discount Furniture then took over the space in 2015. All three of these spaces utilized one of the original escalators from Macy's, traveling in the down direction. It resides in the current Bob's south entrance.

On June 23, 2017, the original Sears store in the Hunt Valley Towne Centre, an original part of the Mall that was one of 235 properties Sears Holdings spun off into Seritage Growth Properties in 2015, closed, as part of Sears' announcement of closing 20 stores across the United States.

In 2018, Part of the first level of the former Sears became Michaels and HomeGoods.

On December 7, 2020, it was announced that Ashley HomeStore will open a new location in the former Sears, expected to take up a sizable chunk of the second floor.

On February 9, 2021, it was announced that OneLife Fitness would open a new 55,000 square-foot two-story gym in the former Sears. Part of the new location will be built off of the existing Sears building. It will include a boutique studio for barre, spark and apex classes, a large cardio area, an indoor lap pool and a kid's club.

A 310-unit apartment building is expected to break ground on one of the parking lots of the Sears building.

== Transit connections ==
In 1997, the Baltimore Light Rail was extended north from its then-terminus at Timonium (now Fairgrounds) to Hunt Valley station in the parking lot of Hunt Valley Mall. There were hopes that this would increase business to the struggling mall. Increased lighting, security officers and off duty police were added to ward off any additional crime.

Prior to the light rail's extension, the mall was served by Maryland Transit Administration Bus Route 9. Today, this route operates to the nearby International Circle.
