= McCormick Road =

McCormick Road may refer to:

- McCormick Road (Hunt Valley)
  - McCormick Road (Baltimore Light Rail station)
