= Baltimore & Annapolis Trail =

Rail trail in Maryland

Coordinates: 39°5′8.6″N 76°33′28.2″W

Baltimore-Annapolis Trail
- Length: 13.3 mi (21.4 km)
- Established: 1990
- Trailheads: Light Rail at Glen Burnie station & BWI Trail John Oversteet Connector to Naval Academy Bridge in Annapolis, Maryland

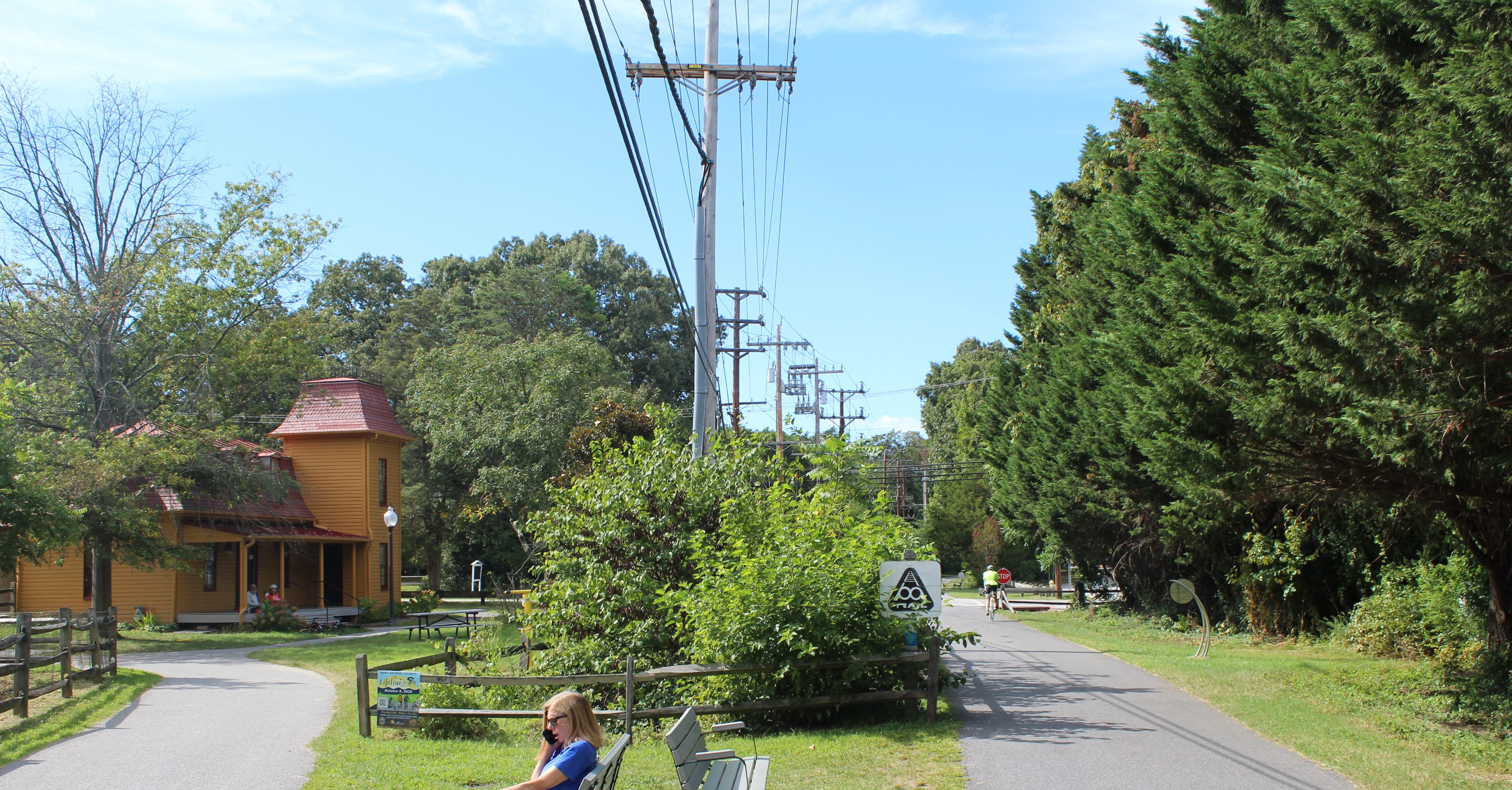
Baltimore & Annapolis Trail Ranger Station.

The Baltimore & Annapolis Trail is a 13.3-mile (21.4 km) rail trail in Anne Arundel County, Maryland. The trail starts at Boulter's Way in Arnold and ends near Baltimore Light Rail's Glen Burnie station in Glen Burnie. Starting near Annapolis at Jonas Green Park, the trail passes (northward) through Arnold, Severna Park, Millersville, Pasadena, and Glen Burnie. The Baltimore & Annapolis Trail follows the route of the Baltimore & Annapolis Railroad from which it derives its name. Proposed in 1972 by Jim Hague, it opened on Oct 7, 1990 as the second rail trail in Maryland.

In June 1996, the Baltimore & Annapolis Trail became part of the East Coast Greenway–from Calais, Maine to Key West, Florida. The trail is part of the American Discovery Trail–a trail from the Atlantic coast of Delaware to San Francisco, California.

== Trail description ==
Built on a former rail line through the suburban region between Annapolis and Baltimore the trail is a paved linear park that encompasses 112 acres (0.45 km^{2}). The trail winds through parks, neighborhoods and natural wooded areas providing scenic views of trees, streams and many historical points. Two of the major stops on the trail are Severna Park at mile 4.8, and Glen Burnie at mile 12.7. The trail also goes by the Marley Station Mall and the Ranger Station.

Along the trail are historical markers labeled A to Z, which correspond to the Guide to Historical Markers on the B&A Trail, written by park volunteer Barry Miller. The historical markers were designed and placed as an Eagle Scout service project by William Brian Sanders of Boy Scout Troop No. 1785 (of Pasadena, Maryland) in 1993. The A marker is near the Annapolis end of the trail at the Winchester Station House, mile 0.1. Marker Z, at mile 13.3, is for the Sawmill Branch, which was a source of water and power for residents in the early 18th century. The historic markers illustrate the communities the railroad helped develop between Baltimore and Annapolis, and the individual achievements of people within these communities. The trail also has switch boxes and sections of track lining the trail.

The trail is lined with flowerbeds and kiosks and includes a Planet Walk sponsored by NASA. The Planet Walk is a linear museum with educational displays for each planet and the sun. The main scenery around the park is forested land, and it contains several bridges. It is also paralleled by a Baltimore Gas and Electric distribution line for almost all of its length.

The trail ends in the north at Glen Burnie near the intersection of Maryland Routes 176 and 648, where it connects to the BWI Trail Loop, a 12.5-mile (20.1 km) loop around the Baltimore–Washington International Thurgood Marshall Airport. The right-of-way for the former railroad continues to the north as the Baltimore Light Rail, which begins in the south at Glen Burnie station.

== History of the railroad and trail ==
The trail derives its name from the last name the railroad line used before ceasing operations. The railroad started as the Annapolis and Baltimore Short Line on March 9, 1887, though it was more commonly known as the Annapolis Short Line. In 1921 it became the North Shore line of the Washington, Baltimore and Annapolis Electric Railway and in 1935 it began its final incarnation as the B&A.

The railroad ended passenger service in 1950, freight service stopped going to Annapolis when a trestle over the Severn River washed out in 1968 and stopped going south of Glen Burley when the Marley Creek Bridge was damaged the next year. The property deteriorated and became an eyesore. When all service on the line ceased in 1972 following damage to the Patapsco River Bridge the railroad tried to abandon the line, and public interest in a linear park began shortly thereafter. In 1973, State Senator Alfred J. Lipin proposed turning the rail line into a trail and asked the Open Space Committee and the Departments of Transportation, Natural Resources and Planning to look into it. The MTA was also eyeing the right-of-way as they wanted to acquire it for a transit line if the abandonment were successful. Residents preferred a trail to a bus line, but Lipin noted that the right-of-way could support both. Maryland passed a law in 1974 that requested that the railroad be acquired for a trail. In 1978, Anne Arundel County filed a condemnation suit to acquire the right-of-way for the trail and to cease lease payments there were already making to cross it. In 1979 Anne Arundel County purchased the 66-foot (20 m) wide corridor for the purpose of creating a rail trail and park.

In 1981 opponents of the trail argued that it would bring drug abusers and burglar's and they were supported by the local NAACP, the Fraternal Order of Police, county firefighters and teachers' organizations. But proponents prevailed and the first phase, a one mile long segment in Glen Burnie from Dorsey Road to the state courthouse in Glen Burnie was completed in 1985 and 1986 as part of Glen Burnie's urban renewal project. Phase Two, from the courthouse to Harundale Mall was also about a mile long and was completed by 1989. Work on Phase Three, a four-mile long segment in Severna Park divided into two sections (from Round Bay Road to Robinson Road, and then north and south of that to Jones Station Road and Earleigh Heights), started in 1987 and was completed in 1988. Work on Phase Four, to connect Phases Two and Three, started by 1989 and finished in 1990. Phase Five (from Jones Station Road to Summer Hill Road), and thus the entire trail, was completed in October of 1990. As Part of state highway project, a bike lane along route 50 and the Severn River Bridge, connected the trail to Annapolis.

In 1987, the state studied using part or all of the corridor to extend the light rail from Glen Burnie to Annapolis, but decided against it.
