= Fairgrounds station =

Light rail station in Timonium, Maryland, US

Fairgrounds
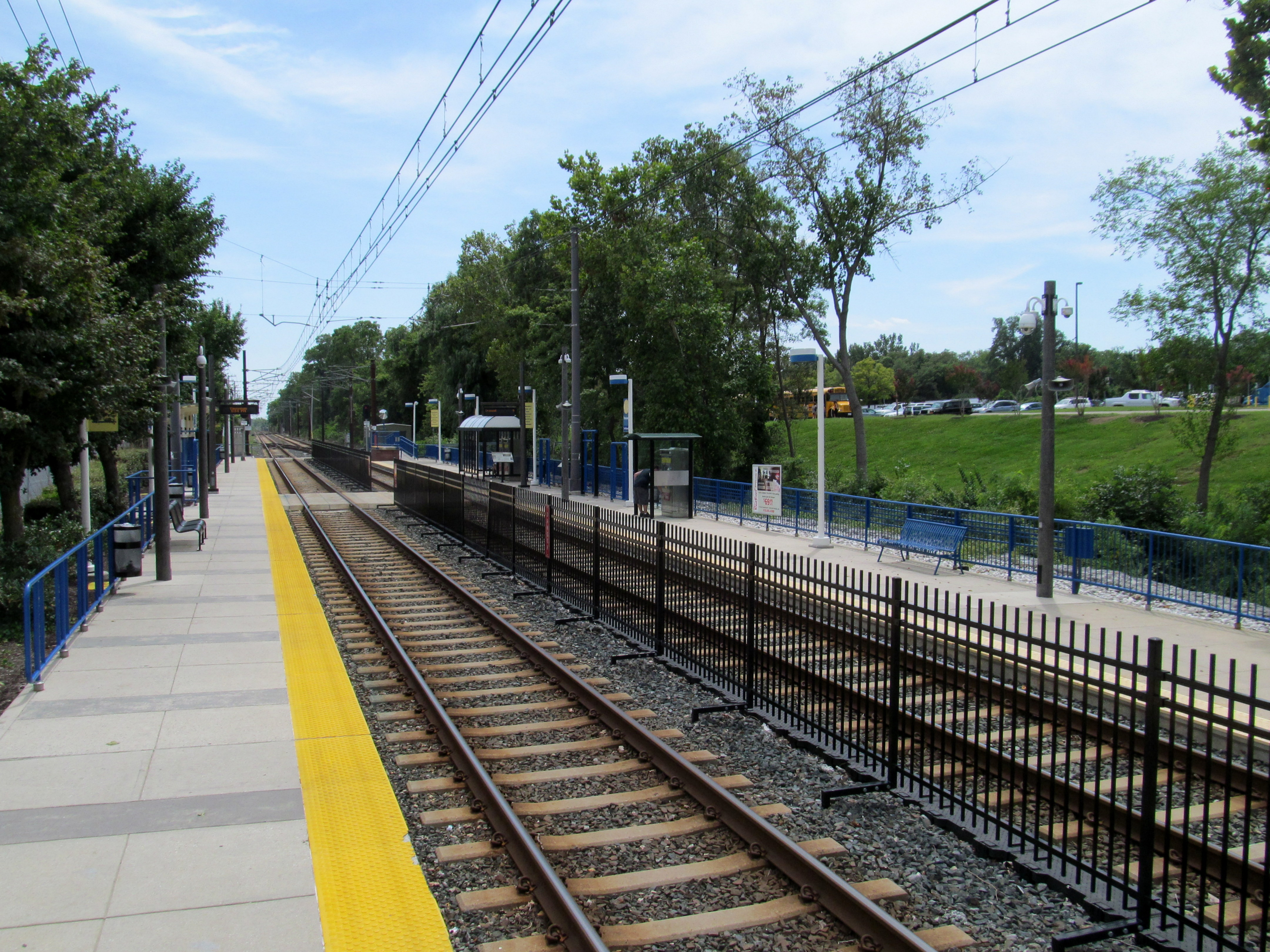
- The station in August 2014

General information
- Location: 2335 Greenspring Drive; Timonium, Maryland
- Coordinates: 39.44870°N 76.63515°W
- Owner: Maryland Transit Administration
- Platforms: 2 side platforms
- Tracks: 2
- Connections: MTA: 9 rabbittransit: 83S; Towson University Shuttle

Construction
- Parking: 744 spaces
- Cycle facilities: Yes
- Accessible: Yes

History
- Opened: April 2, 1992
- Former names: Timonium (1992–2008); Timonium Fairgrounds (2008–2017)

Passengers
- 2017: 960 daily

Services
Preceding station	Maryland Transit Administration	Following station
Timonium toward BWI Airport or Glen Burnie	Light RailLink	Warren Road toward Hunt Valley
Location

Fairgrounds station (formerly Timonium station and Timonium Fairgrounds station) is a Baltimore Light RailLink station located adjacent to the Maryland State Fairgrounds in Timonium, Maryland. The station has two side platforms serving two tracks.

== History ==
The Northern Central Railway had a Timonium station near the modern location of the Fairgrounds station.

Prior to the opening of the Light Rail in 1992, the location was a park-and-ride lot with express bus service to downtown Baltimore. From 1992 until the opening of the Hunt Valley extension in 1997, the station was the northern terminus of the line. Cromwell (Yellow) service terminates at Fairgrounds during peak hours; a pocket track (at the unfinished Texas station to the north) is used to reverse trains.
