= LocalLink 93 (BaltimoreLink) =

Bus route operated by the Maryland Transit Administration

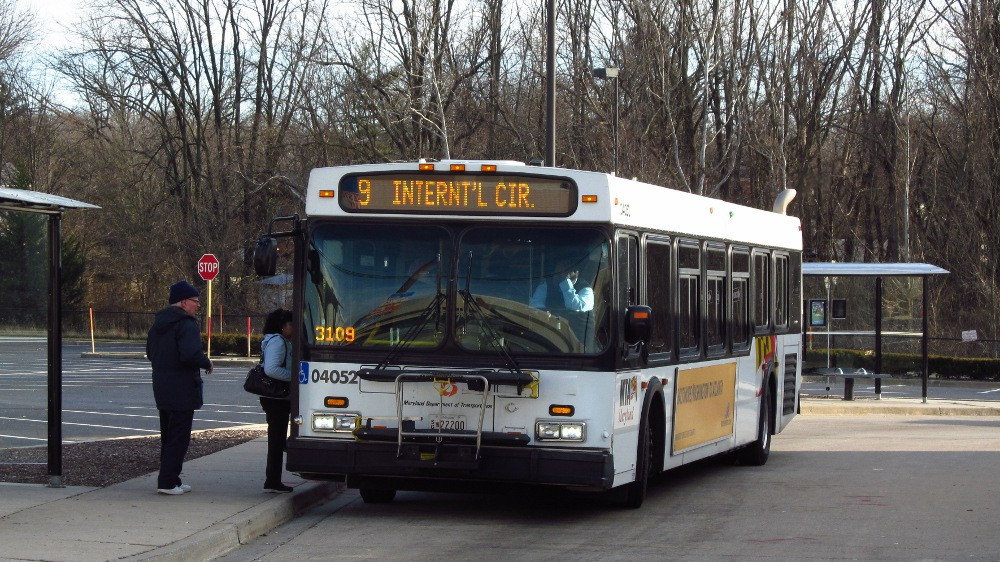

Overview
- System: Maryland Transit Administration
- Garage: Kirk
- Status: active
- Began service: 1974
- Predecessors: Towson and Cockeysville Railroad (1912-1923); Bus Routes 8, 8B, 55, 9

Route
- Locale: Baltimore County
- Communities served: Timonium; Cockeysville
- Landmarks served: Timonium Fairgrounds; Hunt Valley Town Center
- Other routes: MTA Bus Route 8

Service
- Level: Daily
- Frequency: Every 35 minutes Every 20 minutes (peak)
- Weekend frequency: Every 35-60 minutes
- Operates: 4:00 am to 1:00 am

LocalLink 93 is a bus route operated by the Maryland Transit Administration in the suburbs of Baltimore. The line currently runs from the Lutherville Light Rail Stop to International Circle near Hunt Valley Town Center, serving the Timonium and Cockeysville areas.

The bus route is the successor to various branches of Routes 8, 8B, and 55. Route 93 replaced the entirety of Route 9 on June 18, 2017 due to the BaltimoreLink bus system overhaul, with expanded service to Downtown Towson.

== History ==
Route 9 started operating in 1974 as a replacement for other various lines that served Baltimore's York Road corridor north of Towson; historically, all portions of York Road Towson and southward were served by the no. 8 streetcar and bus lines. The first transit service to operate along the York Road corridor north of Towson was the failed Towson and Cockeysville Railroad, which operated from 1912 to 1923.

Prior to the introduction of the current route in 1974, the no. 9 designation was used for several other Baltimore area public transit services. These included the Halethorpe Streetcar, which used that designation from 1900 to 1926 before being absorbed by the no. 3 streetcar (currently served by Route 35), the Ellicott City Streetcar, which operated from 1927 to 1952 before conversion to a bus route (limited service between Baltimore and Ellicott City is currently provided on Route 150; local service along the U.S. 40 corridor of Baltimore is currently provided by Route 23), and as a shuttle service from Sparrows Point to Ft. Howard that operate from 1971 to 1973 (service to Ft. Howard was provided by Route 4 from then until 1993, and Route 6 from 1997 to 1998, and is no longer provided).

=== Origin ===
Originally, Route 9 operated to/from downtown Baltimore during peak hours, and had a southern terminus at Towson State University at other times. Weekend service was not provided then, was not introduced until 1986, and even then was very limited.

As development of northern Baltimore County continued, the Route 9 was improved. Selected trips and deviations were added to International Circle, Loveton Business Park, and developing residential, commercial, and industrial areas.

In 1992, in conjunction with the opening of Baltimore's Central Light Rail line, route 9 line was modified. All service south of Northern Parkway was eliminated, except for a few early morning northbound trips before the opening of the light rail, which followed the line's old route.

In 1993, midday and evening service, which previously operated hourly, were provided in 15-minute intervals. The southern off-peak weekday terminus was moved to the Lutherville Light Rail Stop to eliminate duplication with Route 8. Weekend service was also improved to every 45 minutes on Saturday and hourly on Sunday.

In 1997, service was reduced, as the light rail was extended to Hunt Valley, and much of the Route 9's ridership was projected to use the light rail instead. Midday service was reduced by 50%.

In 2000, Route 9 was combined with Route 8. Selected Route 8 trips were extended north of Lutherville to Hunt Valley. This provided single-seat bus service along all portions of the York Road corridor.

== Overhaul and return of service ==
In October 2005, as part of the Greater Baltimore Bus Initiative, a comprehensive overhaul plan for the region's transit system, Route 9 line was re-introduced after a 5-year absence. It was split from the long Route 8, which returned to its old route. In addition, trips to Loveton Business Park were no longer provided. Initially, International Circle service also was not provided, but this was reintroduced in February 2006.

Initially all trips on route 9 would terminate at Hunt Valley Town Centre but due to weight restrictions Hunt Valley Town Centre management prohibited MTA buses from being allowed to enter the premises in June 2005 before the reinstatement of route 9. So route 9 was routed to International Circle as a layover point on the north end of route 9 as other layover ideas did not work out.

Route 9 currently operates between the Lutherville Light Rail Stop and International Circle via its basic route at all times, with no extended trips or branches. Since being reintroduced, changes have been made, mostly during peak hours, to improve frequencies and schedule adherence.

=== BaltimoreLink ===
As part of the BaltimoreLink transit overhaul, on June 18, 2017 Route 9 will be replaced by LocalLink 93, which will follow the current route, and extend the south-bound end to Towson.
