= Baltimore Light RailLink =

Light rail system in Baltimore

Light RailLink

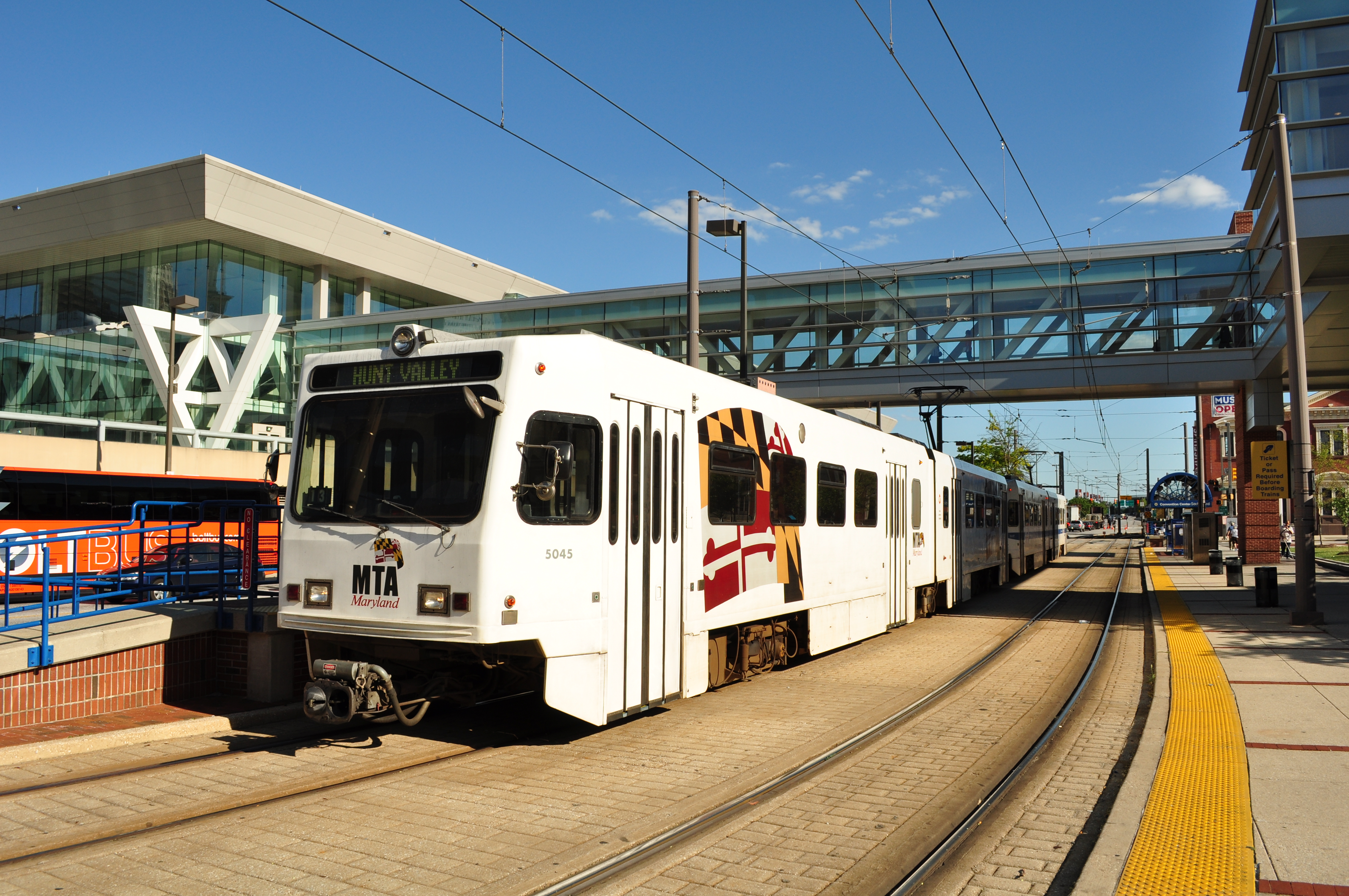
- A train at Convention Center station in 2010

Overview
- Locale: Baltimore, Maryland, United States
- Transit type: Light rail
- Number of lines: 3
- Number of stations: 33
- Daily ridership: 17,600 (weekdays, Q2 2026)
- Annual ridership: 5,015,100 (2025)

Operation
- Began operation: April 1992
- Operator: Maryland Transit Administration

Technical
- System length: 30 mi (48.3 km)
- Track gauge: 4 ft 8 1/2 in (1,435 mm) standard gauge
- Minimum radius of curvature: 100 ft (30 m)
- Electrification: Overhead line, 750 V DC
System map
Light RailLink highlighted in blue

The Baltimore Light RailLink (formerly Baltimore Light Rail, also known simply as the "Light Rail") is a light rail system serving Baltimore, Maryland, United States, and its northern and southern suburbs. It is operated by the Maryland Transit Administration (MTA Maryland) and runs from Hunt Valley to Glen Burnie, with a spur to BWI Airport.

In downtown Baltimore, it uses street-embedded tracks. Outside the central portions of the city, the line is located on private rights-of-way, mostly from the defunct Northern Central Railway, Baltimore and Annapolis Railroad and Washington, Baltimore and Annapolis Electric Railway. The system had a ridership of 5,015,100, or about 17,600 per weekday, as of the second quarter of 2026.

== History ==
=== Initial segment ===
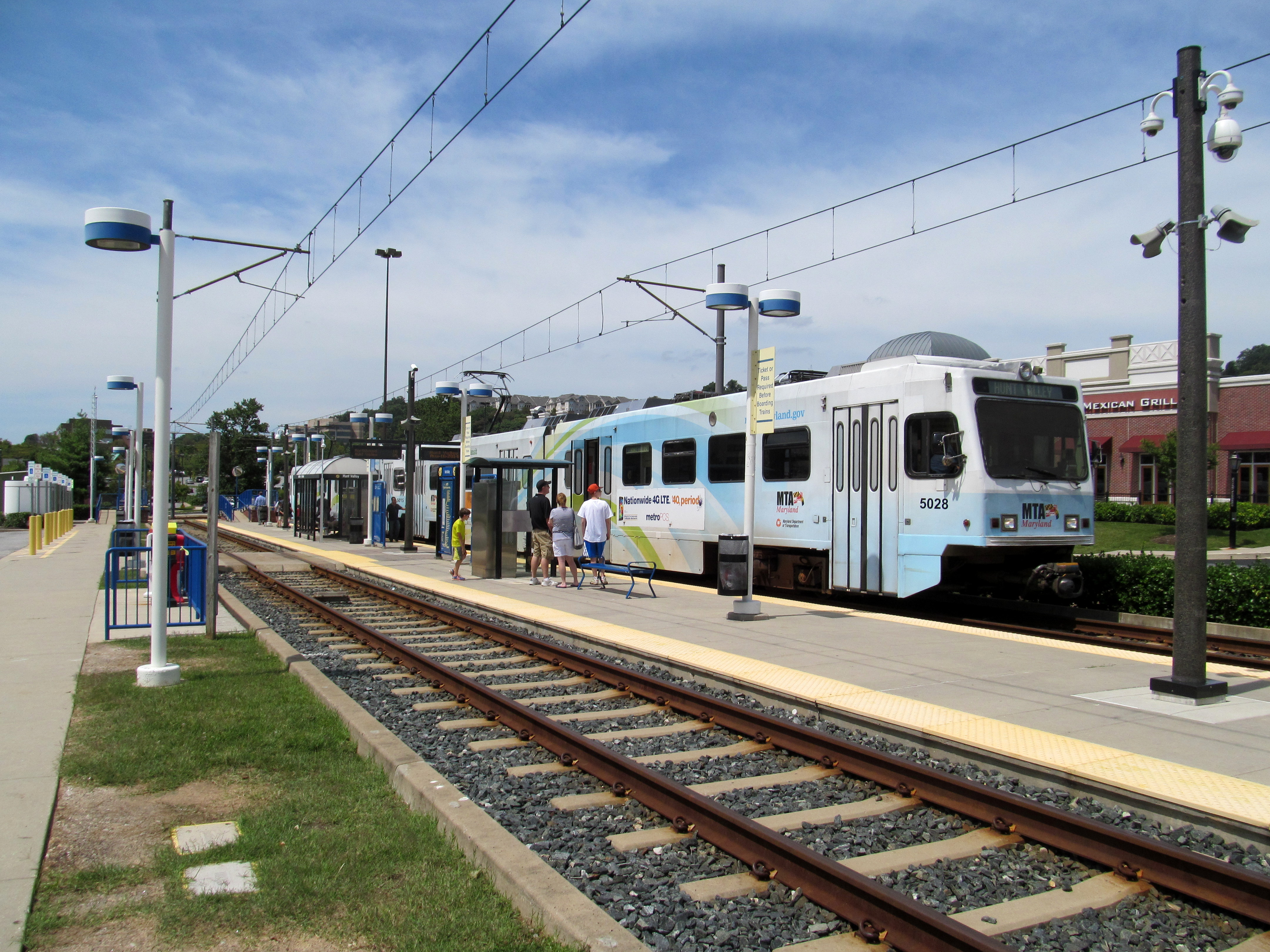
Hunt Valley, the terminus of the 5-station northern extension opened in 1997, pictured here in 2014

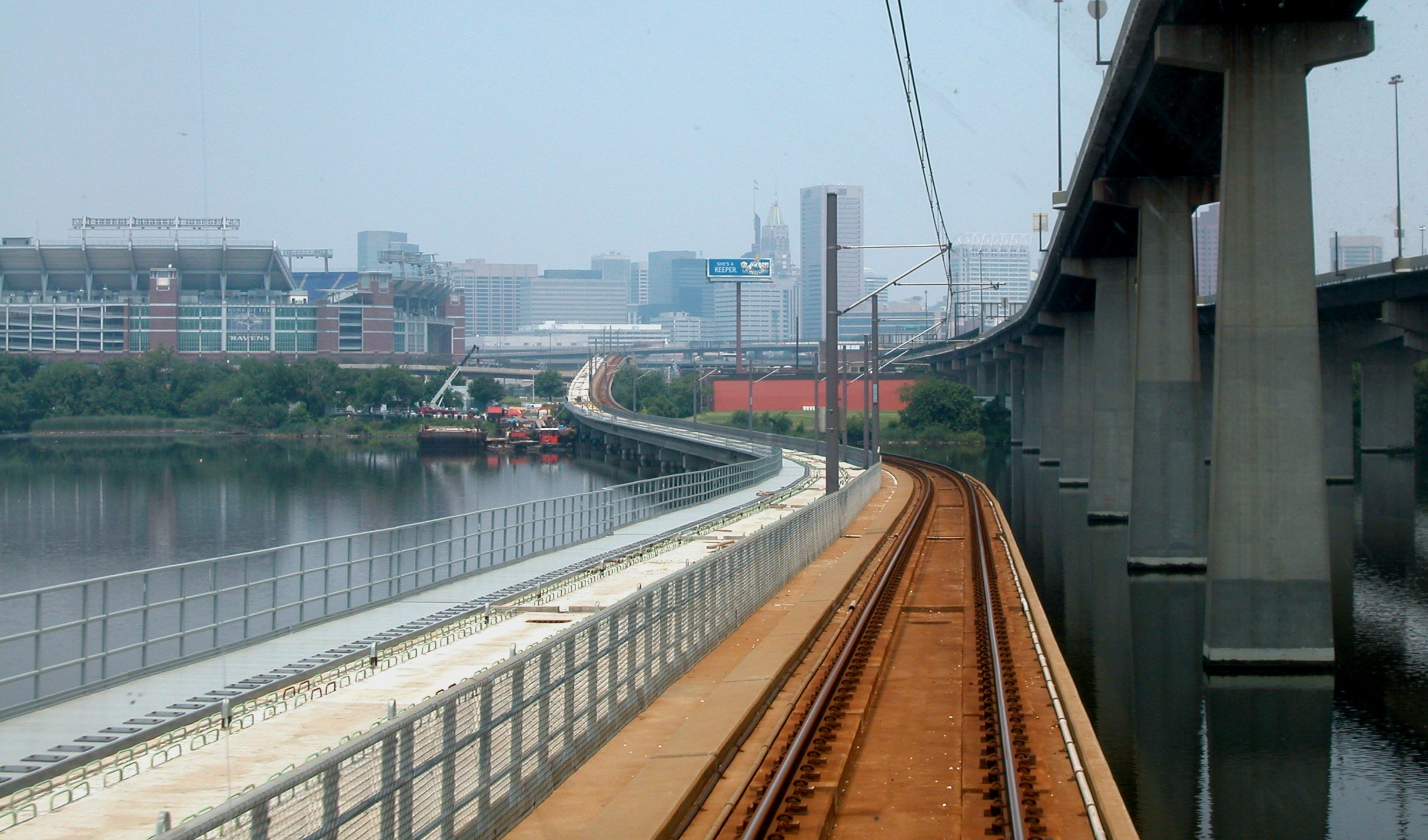
Construction work in progress in June 2003 to add a second track to the bridge over the Middle Branch of the Patapsco River

The origins of the Light RailLink lie in a 1966 Baltimore area transit plan that envisioned six rapid transit lines radiating from the city center. By 1983, only one of the plan's lines—the "Northwest" line—had been built, becoming the Metro SubwayLink. Much of the plan's "North" and "South" lines ran along rights-of-way once used by interurban streetcar lines and the commuter rail routes of the Northern Central Railway, Washington, Baltimore and Annapolis Electric Railway, and Baltimore and Annapolis Railroad.

Beginning in the late 1980s, Governor of Maryland and former Baltimore mayor William Donald Schaefer pushed for a transit line along the plan's "North" and "South" corridors, motivated in part by a desire to establish a rail transit link to the new baseball park being built at Camden Yards for the Baltimore Orioles. Light RailLink was built quickly and inexpensively without federal funds, a rarity for a U.S. transit project. The initial system was a single 22.5-mile (36.2 km) line, all at-grade except for a bridge over the Middle Branch of the Patapsco River just south of downtown Baltimore. The line ran from Timonium in Baltimore County in the north to Glen Burnie in Anne Arundel County in the south.

The line opened in stages over a 14-month period. The initial segment from Timonium Fairgrounds station (now Fairgrounds station) to Camden Yards station opened for limited service for Orioles games on April 2, 1992, and for full service on May 17. A three-station extension to Patapsco opened on August 20, 1992, followed by a 4-station extension to Linthicum on April 2, 1993, and an additional 2-station extension to Glen Burnie on May 20, 1993.

Station placement and design were intended to be flexible and change over time, as stations could be built or closed at low cost. However, they were at times dictated by politics rather than planning: proposed stops in Ruxton, Riderwood, and Cross Keys were not built due to local opposition, while Mt. Royal station (now Mt. Royal/MICA station) and Timonium Business Park station (now Timonium station) were built despite nearly being removed from the plan because the University of Baltimore and a local business group funded them. Falls Road station was built with less parking than ridership required because community requests and a fence prevented riders from accessing a nearby commercial building.

=== Expansion ===
Three extensions to the system were added in 1997. On September 9, the line was extended north 4.5 miles (7.2 km) to Hunt Valley, adding five stations that served a major business park and a mall. On December 6, two short but important branches were added to the system: a 0.3-mile (0.48 km) spur in Baltimore that provided a link to the Penn Station intercity rail hub, and a 2.7-mile (4.3 km) spur to the terminal of BWI Airport.

On September 6, 1998, the Hamburg Street station (now Stadium/Federal Hill station) opened as an infill station between the existing Westport and Camden Yards stations. Adjacent to M&T Bank Stadium, it was initially only open during Ravens games and other major stadium events, but became a full-time stop on July 1, 2005.

To save money, much of the system was built with only a single track. While this allowed the system to be constructed and opened quickly, it limited the system's flexibility: much of the line was restricted to 17-minute headways, with no way to reduce headways during peak hours. Federal money was acquired to double track most of the system; much of the line south of downtown Baltimore was shut down in 2004 and north of downtown shut down in 2005 in order to complete this project. The northern section up to Timonium reopened in December 2005; the rest opened in February 2006. The line north of Gilroy Road and the BWI Airport spur remain single tracked.

The Camden Yards–Penn Station route was suspended in September 2019 and replaced by a bus bridge due to a lack of available operators. Service later resumed, but was again suspended in 2022 due to Amtrak construction at Penn Station. Light rail service to Penn Station resumed in June 2025.

=== Incidents ===
On July 10, 2019, part of the northbound platform at Convention Center station fell into a sinkhole caused by a broken water main. The line was closed between Camden and North Avenue until August 19.

On December 7, 2023, MTA Maryland announced the system would shut down indefinitely after inspections revealed a fire hazard in the rolling stock. A free shuttle bus service connected Light Rail stations as repairs were made to the 53-car fleet. Service resumed on December 23.

== Operation ==
=== Routing and schedules ===
The Light RailLink system consists of a main north–south line on which 28 of the system's 33 stops are located. There are two branches on the southern end to BWI Airport and Glen Burnie that have two stations each and one spur in Baltimore City for Penn Station that can only be entered heading north and exited heading south. There are still single-track sections north of Timonium, where headways are limited to 15 minutes.

The Light RailLink system has two train runs. One runs the full length of the main line between Hunt Valley and either BWI Airport or Glen Burnie, alternating between the two every other trip, with some off-peak trains originating or terminating at either North Avenue or Fairgrounds instead of Hunt Valley. The other—the Penn-Camden Shuttle—only runs through downtown between Penn Station and Camden Station.

The light rail operates from 4:00 a.m. to 12:45 a.m. on weekdays, 4:15 a.m. to 12:45 a.m. on Saturdays, and 10 a.m. to 10 p.m. on Sundays and major holidays. At peak hours on weekdays (from the first trains of the day until 10 a.m., and from 4 p.m. to 6 p.m.), the BWI–Hunt Valley and Glen Burnie–Fairgrounds routes see 20-minute headways; at other times on weekdays and all day on weekends, there are 30-minute headways on both routes (with Glen Burnie trains traveling all the way to Hunt Valley). The Camden Yards-Penn Station route sees 30-minute headways at all times. Because there is significant overlap on these routes, most of the system sees 10-minute peak and 15-minute off-peak headways; stations in the downtown section between Mt. Royal and Camden Yards are served by six trains an hour off-peak and eight trains an hour at peak. (Paradoxically, the Fairgrounds-Hunt Valley section actually sees longer headways at peak hours.)

Most of the light rail's route is on dedicated right-of-way that has grade crossings equipped with crossing gates. The remainder of the route in downtown Baltimore between Camden Station and Mt. Royal uses shared right of way on Howard Street, where trains mix with automobile traffic and their movement is controlled by traffic signals. In 2007, a transit signal priority system was implemented on this section, resulting in time savings of 25%. From south of Falls Road to North Avenue, the light rail runs parallel to the Jones Falls Expressway, and from Camden Yards to north of Westport, it parallels Interstate 395. North of Falls Road and south of Westport, it follows its own path towards its respective termini.

=== Fares and transit connections ===
MTA fares are identical for the Metro SubwayLink, Light RailLink, and local buses: a one-way trip costs $2.00. Daily, weekly, and monthly unlimited-ride passes are also available that are good on all three transit modes. A passenger with a one-way ticket can change Light RailLink trains if necessary to complete their journey, the only instance of a one-way MTA ticket being good for a ride on more than one vehicle, but transferring to a bus or the Metro requires a new one-way fare or a pass. Automated ticket vending machines that sell tickets and passes are available at all Light RailLink stations.

The Light RailLink's ticketing is based on a proof-of-payment system. Passengers must have a ticket or pass before boarding. Maryland Transit Administration Police officers ride some trains and randomly check passengers to make sure that they are carrying a valid ticket or pass and can issue criminal citations for those without one. Civilian Fare Inspectors also conduct ticket checks, alighting those without fare.

Most Light RailLink stations are served by several MTA bus routes and passengers can make platform-to-platform transfers with the MARC Camden Line at Camden Yards and with the MARC Penn Line at Penn Station. There are no cross-platform connections with the Metro SubwayLink. The Lexington Market subway and light rail stations are a block apart and connected only via surface streets.

=== Ridership ===
Baltimore Light RailLink Ridership 1995 – present
Fiscal Year	Average Weekday Ridership	Annual Ridership	Ref.
1995		5,794,500	
1996	20,400	6,747,300	
1997	22,500	7,015,700	
1998	27,000	8,390,900	
1999	29,300	8,796,600	
2000	25,600	8,367,500	
2001	26,000	8,362,900	
2002	26,000	8,331,600	
2003	25,600	7,509,800	
2004	19,000	4,697,600	
2005			
2006		6,762,300	
2007	31,100	7,085,100	
2008	33,600	8,054,100	
2009	34,700	8,981,200	
2010	36,300	8,371,000	
2011	27,200	8,462,300	
2012	29,200	8,729,400	
2013	26,800	8,588,000	
2014	27,100	8,092,300	
2015	22,800	6,888,500	
2016		7,831,900	
2017	23,900	7,353,900	
2018	18,400	7,157,000	
2019	25,300	6,508,700	
2020	8,000	2,803,900	
2021	8,500	2,718,100	
2022	10,300	3,262,100	
2023	12,500	3,546,300	
2024	15,200	5,015,500	
2025			

Key
Record high
Record low

== Rolling stock ==
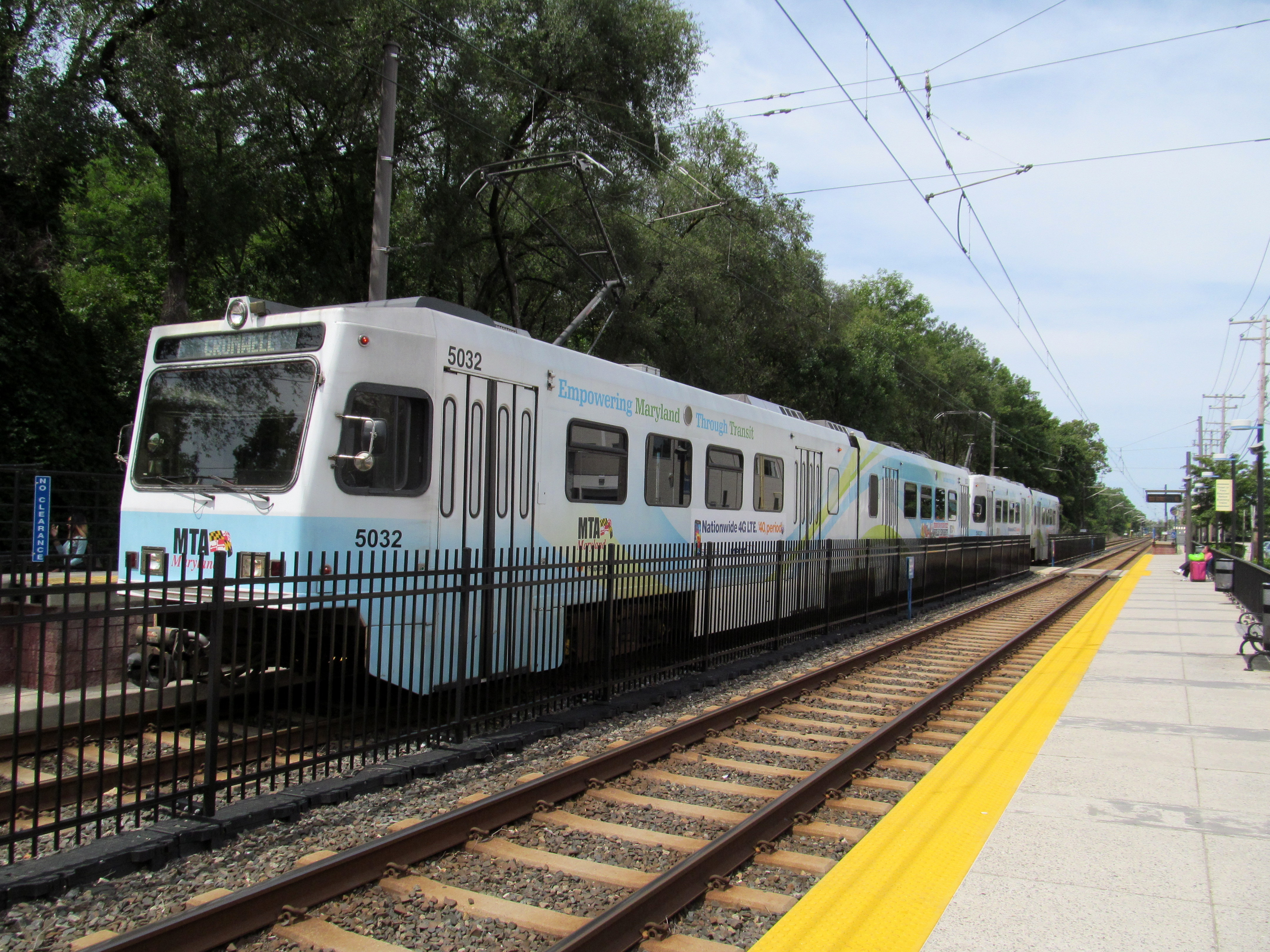
A typical two-car train at Lutherville station in 2014

Baltimore's Light RailLink vehicles (LRVs) were built by ABB Traction, the U.S. division of ABB. The initial set was delivered in 1991–1992 as the line was being built; a supplemental order of similar cars built by AAI Corporation was delivered in 1997, when the extensions came into service.

Baltimore LRVs are larger than traditional streetcars and those used on San Francisco's Muni Metro or Boston's Green Line. The articulated cars are 95 feet (28.96 m) long over coupler faces, 9.5 feet (2.90 m) wide, and 12.5 feet (3.81 m) high, and can accommodate 85 seated and 91 standing passengers. The cars operate on 4 ft 8 1/2 in (1,435 mm) standard gauge track. One-, two- and three-car trains are all routinely seen in service. Trains are powered by 750 volt DC from overhead lines via a pantograph, and have a maximum speed of 60 miles per hour (97 km/h). When delivered, they were the first transit vehicles in the United States to employ A/C propulsion. Each LRV is powered by four 275 hp (205 kW) motors (1,100 hp or 820 kW total); the middle truck of three-car trains is unpowered.

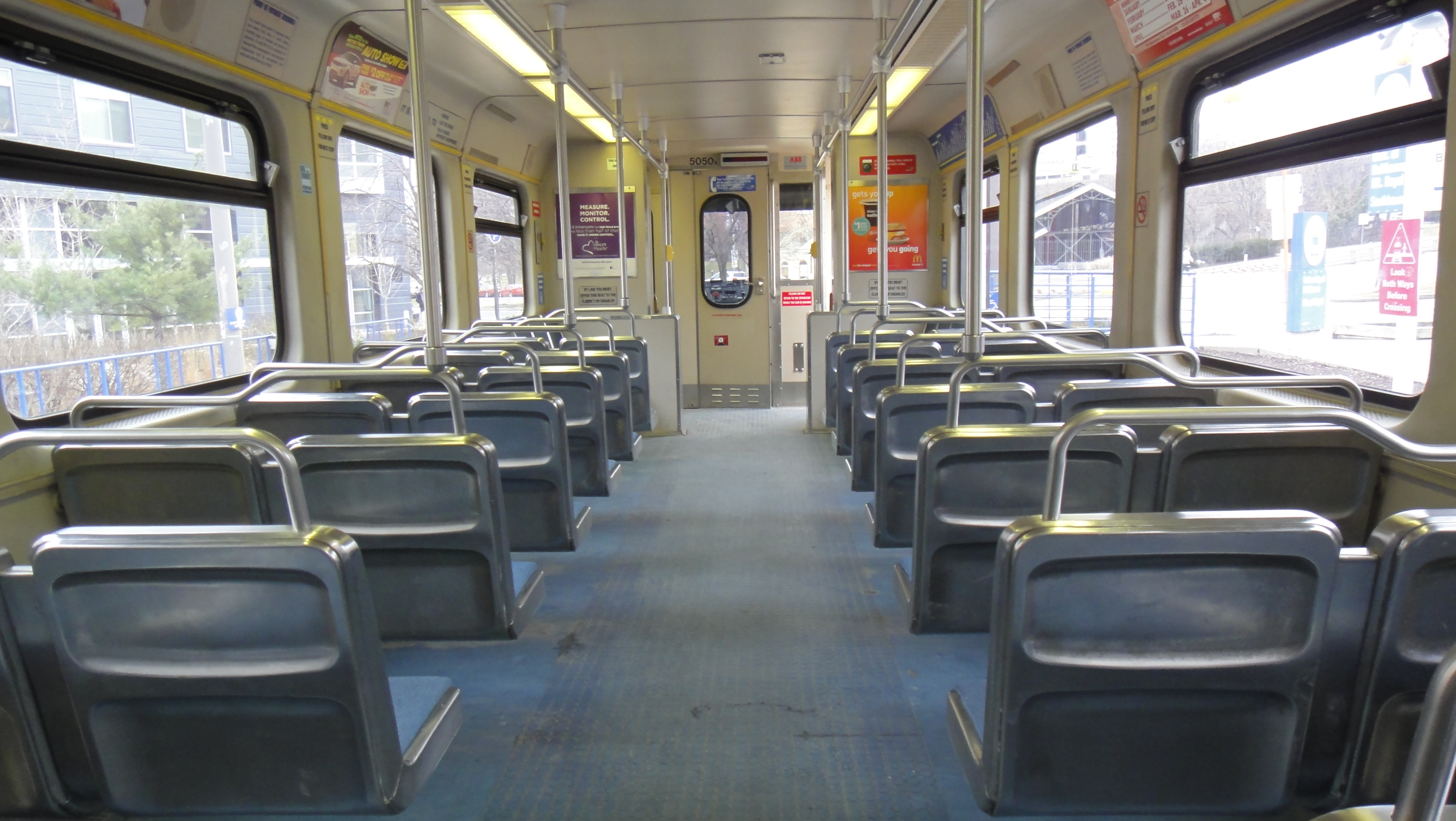
Interior of a Baltimore Light RailLink vehicle

As of 2024, the MTA had 53 individual light rail cars. During typical weekday peak-time service, approximately 30 to 35 cars are required; a somewhat higher number of cars are put into service immediately after Orioles and Ravens games. For weekday service, as well as days of Orioles games or events at the CFG Bank Arena or Baltimore Convention Center, trains going from Hunt Valley to Cromwell and BWI Airport are generally run with two cars, while three-car trains are put into service for Ravens games and major downtown events. The Penn Station-Camden Yards shuttle is typically operated with one-car trains. The MTA also owns a variety of maintenance of way equipment, which can use diesel power in emergencies.

A mid-life upgrade of the light rail vehicles began in 2013. On September 9, 2013, a contract for mid-life overhauls of the light rail vehicles was awarded to Alstom. Five vehicles at a time were sent for rebuilding, involving testing, removal of all interior and exterior components and replacement with new propulsion systems. The overhaul is scheduled for completion in March 2018. The overhauled cars began testing in early 2016. By 2021 the original order of ABB vehicles had their interiors upgrades with security cameras, LED lighting, and LCD screens that show the train's position along the line.

In February 2024, the Maryland Transit Administration announced that they had been awarded $213,696,341 in grant funding from the U.S. Department of Transportation’s Federal Transit Administration’s Rail Vehicle Replacement program to replace all 52 aging Light Rail vehicles in its fleet with new, modern railcars.

== Future ==
While there are several plans and proposals to expand the system, none are approved or funded. An independent commission on Baltimore-area transit made a number of suggestions in a 2002 report for new lines and expansions of existing lines. Newer proposals include expanding service on the existing Central Light RailLink line by extending Sunday service via the BaltimoreLink plan, as well as new stations and spurs.

=== Texas station ===
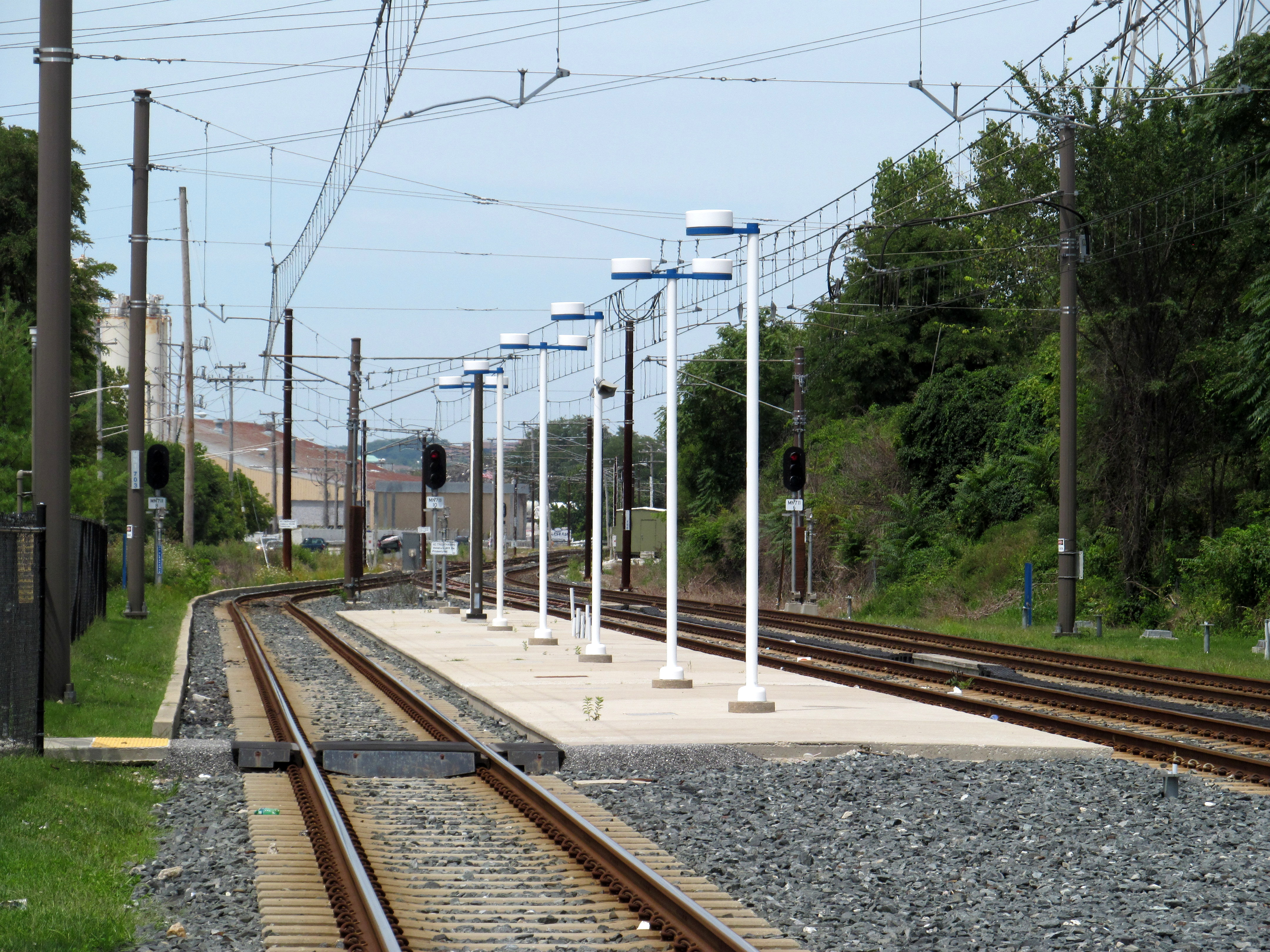
The incomplete Texas station in 2014

There are plans to add an infill station between the existing Timonium and Warren Road stations in Texas, Cockeysville. An island was built at this point on the line in conjunction with the 2005 double-tracking work to provide a turn-back point for trains not going all the way to Hunt Valley, which could be converted into a station at a later date.

=== Stockholm Street station ===
In the 2015 South Baltimore Gateway Masterplan, the city of Baltimore proposed a new light rail stop along the Central Light RailLink line at Stockholm Street, in between Hamburg Street and Westport. The new station would be located near a proposed new MARC station west of Russell Street, and would provide additional access to the Baltimore Greyhound Bus Terminal, the Horseshoe Casino, and new businesses in the Carroll-Camden Industrial Area.

=== Port Covington extension ===
In January 2016, plans were unveiled by Sagamore Development Company, owned by Under Armour CEO Kevin Plank, regarding the redevelopment of Port Covington in South Baltimore. The new plan for Port Covington calls for two proposed new light rail stations, along with new residential and commercial development. The first station would be located west of Hanover Street, and the other would be located at the intersection of East McComas Street and East Cromwell Street, just south of Federal Hill. This proposed extension would create a new spur from the Central Light RailLink line by crossing the Middle Branch of the Patapsco River south of Interstate 95.

=== Low floor vehicles ===
The MTA plans to transition the system from high floor vehicles to low floor LRVs and requested information from low-floor LRV vendors in January 2023.

=== Red Line ===
The Red Line is a planned 14.1-mile (22.7 km), 19-station light rail line traveling east–west that would intersect with the existing Light RailLink downtown; this would be a separate service, with no track connection to the existing Light RailLink, though there would be opportunities for transfer between the two in the vicinity of University Center / Baltimore Street. The line would operate in a total of 4.7-mile (7.6 km) of tunnels through the downtown area (and along Cooks Lane), with the majority of the rest of the system operating at-grade and just a few aerial sections, as well as in the median of the former Interstate 170 freeway. The Red Line was cancelled by Governor Larry Hogan, who had campaigned against it in the 2014 Maryland gubernatorial election, on June 25, 2015. Wes Moore, his successor, indicated his intention to revive it shortly after being elected, and formally announced the return of the project in a ceremony with Baltimore mayor Brandon Scott on June 15, 2023.

== See also ==
- Baltimore Metro SubwayLink
- List of Baltimore Light RailLink stations
- Light rail in the United States
- List of United States light rail systems by ridership
- List of tram and light rail transit systems
- List of rail transit systems in the United States
