= Glen Burnie station =

Baltimore Light RailLink station in Glen Burnie, Maryland

Glen Burnie
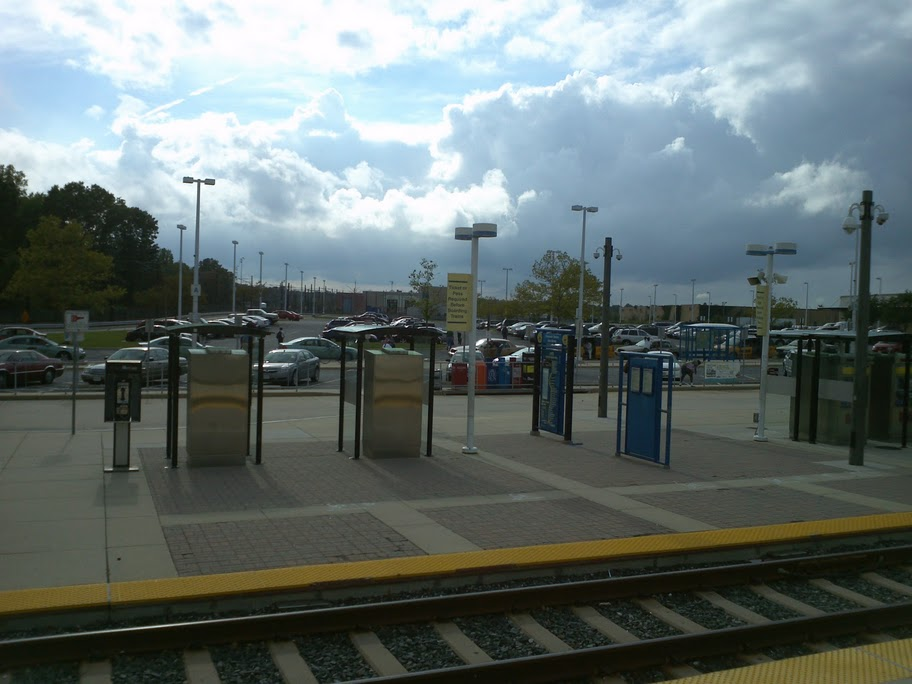
- Glen Burnie station in 2011

General information
- Location: 7378 Baltimore-Annapolis Boulevard; Glen Burnie, Maryland
- Coordinates: 39°10′19.7″N 76°37′59.2″W
- Owner: Maryland Transit Administration
- Platforms: 1 island platform
- Tracks: 2
- Connections: 14; 215 Annapolis Express; BWI Trail; Baltimore & Annapolis Trail

Construction
- Parking: 795 free spaces
- Cycle facilities: Yes
- Accessible: Yes

History
- Opened: 1887 (B&A Railroad)
- Rebuilt: 1993
- Former names: Cromwell/Glen Burnie (1993–2017)

Passengers
- 2017: 1,078 daily

Services
Preceding station	Maryland Transit Administration	Following station
Terminus	Light RailLink	Ferndale toward Hunt Valley
Location

Glen Burnie station (formerly Cromwell/Glen Burnie station) is a Baltimore Light RailLink station in Glen Burnie, Maryland. It is one of the system's two southern terminals, and one of two stations in Glen Burnie. Trains depart Glen Burnie bound for Fairgrounds station (during peak commuting hours on weekdays) or Hunt Valley station (at all other times). Unlike the nearby Ferndale station, there are currently 795 free parking spaces and connections can be made to MTA Maryland's Route 14 bus from here. South of the station, the lines terminate on an embankment on the northwest corner of Maryland Route 648 and Maryland Route 176 to the east of Interstate 97, and the right of way is replaced by the Baltimore and Annapolis Rail Trail.

== Station layout ==
G	Street level	Exit/entrance, buses, parking
G	Side platform
G	Northbound	Light RailLink toward Fairgrounds or Hunt Valley (Ferndale) → ← Light RailLink termination track
G	Island platform
G	Northbound	Light RailLink toward Fairgrounds or Hunt Valley (Ferndale) → ← Light RailLink termination track
G	Side platform

== Nearby attractions ==
Being the southernmost Light Rail stop, Glen Burnie Station provides access to numerous points of interests throughout northern Anne Arundel County. The Baltimore & Annapolis Trail provides a direct cycling link (13.3 miles) from the station to Maryland's capital, Annapolis. Nearby attractions include:

- Anne Arundel Community College Glen Burnie Campus
- Army National Guard
- Cromwell Field Shopping Center
- Cromwell Business Park
- Downtown Glen Burnie
- Glen Burnie District Courthouse
- Glen Burnie High School
- Glen Burnie Plaza Shopping Center
- Monsenior Slade Catholic School
- Sawmill Creek Park
