= BWI Airport station (Light RailLink) =

Baltimore Light Rail station at Baltimore-Washington International Airport in Maryland

BWI Airport
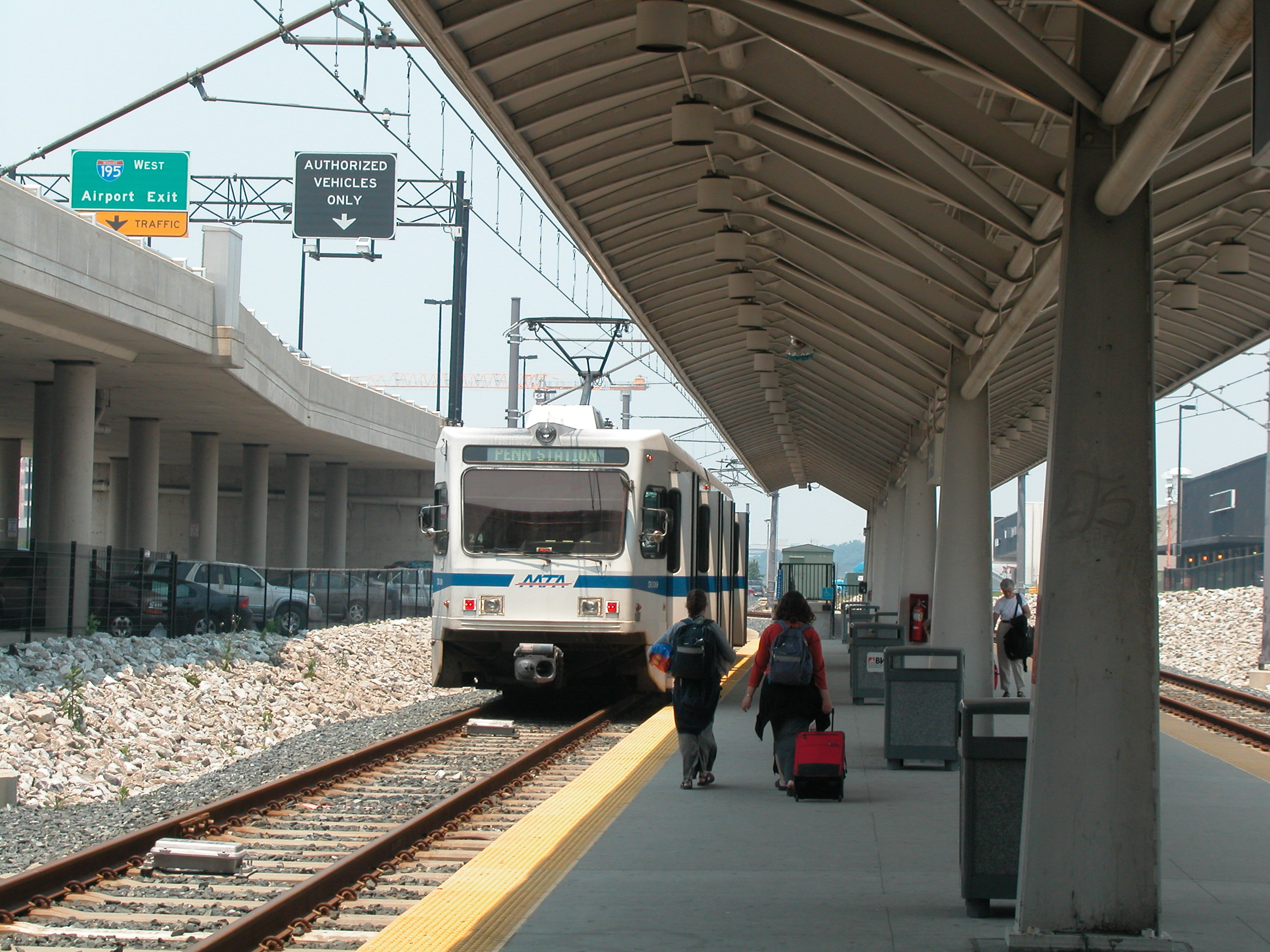
- Light rail vehicle at the station in 2003

General information
- Location: 7153 Elm Road; International Pier at BWI Terminal
- Coordinates: 39°10′57.2″N 76°40′10.5″W
- Owner: MTA Maryland
- Platforms: 1 island platform
- Tracks: 2
- Connections: BWI Concourse E BWI Shuttle to BWI Rail Station; MTA BaltimoreLink: 17, 99, 201; RTA: 501 (Silver)

Construction
- Parking: Paid parking nearby
- Accessible: Yes

History
- Opened: 1997

Passengers
- 2017: 994 daily

Services
Preceding station	Maryland Transit Administration	Following station
Terminus	Light RailLink	BWI Business District toward Hunt Valley
Location

BWI Airport station is a Baltimore Light RailLink station at the Baltimore-Washington International Airport in Maryland. It is one of the two southern terminals of the Baltimore Light Rail. The station platforms are just outside an entrance to the International Concourse on the lower level.

The station opened in 1997, with trains then serving the station every 34 minutes and operating to Penn Station. The system's routes and schedules have varied over the years; as of 2023, trains depart for Hunt Valley every twenty minutes during peak commuter hours and every half-hour at other times.

The station and the airport are served by Maryland Transit Administration's bus routes 75 and 201; 24 hours a day, 7 days a week. Other local transit agencies also have buses serving the airport, including Howard Transit's Silver Route.

== Station layout ==
Platform
Platform	Northbound	Light RailLink toward Hunt Valley (BWI Business District) →
Platform	Island platform
Platform	Northbound	Light RailLink toward Hunt Valley (BWI Business District) →
G	Street level	Exit/entrance, buses, BWI Airport arrivals level

== Incidents ==
In 2000, there were two accidents in which light rail trains failed to stop at the station, ran into the end bumpers, and telescoped into the station's roof. In one case, the operator was under the influence of cocaine and oxycodone; he was fired four days after the accident and charged with reckless endangerment. In the other case, the operator was under the influence of prescription medication that made him drowsy.

As a result, a trip stop was installed prior to the station. Operators of trains approaching the station must stop, reach out of the vehicle, and clear the trip stop before proceeding at 10 mph (16 km/h) into the station. A proper medical policy was also instituted at the insistence of the Federal Transit Administration.
