= Hunt Valley station =

Light rail station in Hunt Valley, Maryland, US

Hunt Valley
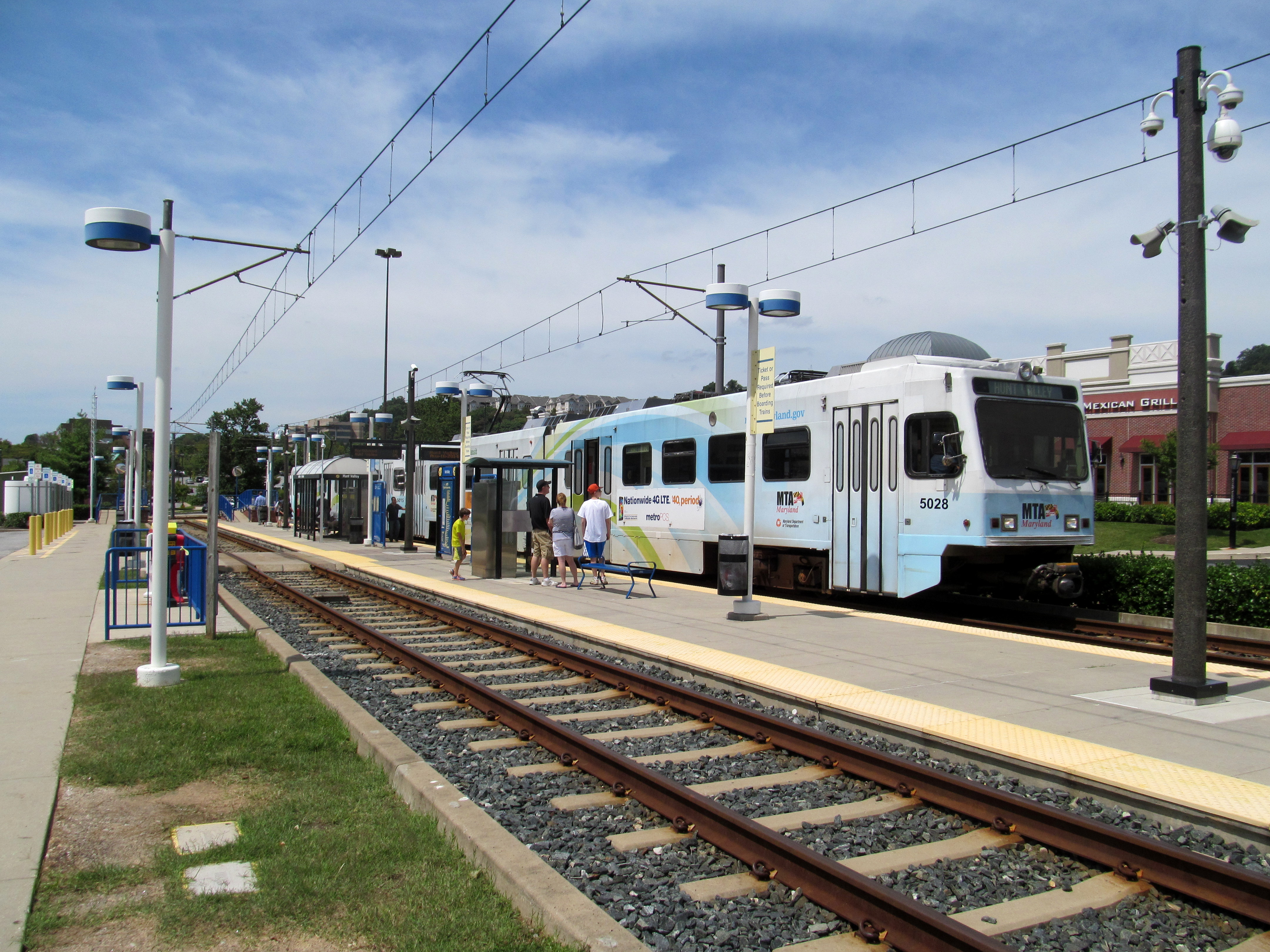
- A train at Hunt Valley in 2014

General information
- Location: 98 Shawan Road; Hunt Valley, Maryland
- Coordinates: 39°29′46.26″N 76°39′13.45″W
- Owner: Maryland Transit Administration
- Platforms: 1 island platform
- Tracks: 2
- Connections: rabbittransit: 83S

Construction
- Parking: 139 spaces
- Cycle facilities: Yes
- Accessible: Yes

History
- Opened: September 9, 1997

Passengers
- 2017: 728 daily

Services
Preceding station	Maryland Transit Administration	Following station
Pepper Road toward BWI Airport or Glen Burnie	Light RailLink	Terminus
Location

Hunt Valley station is a Baltimore Light Rail station located at the Hunt Valley Towne Centre shopping complex in Hunt Valley, Maryland. The station opened in 1997 as the terminus of a northern extension of the Light Rail system. It has a single island platform serving two tracks, which continue east of the platform as tail tracks.
