= Charles Street (Baltimore) =

State Highway in Maryland, US

Maryland Route 139
- Charles Street
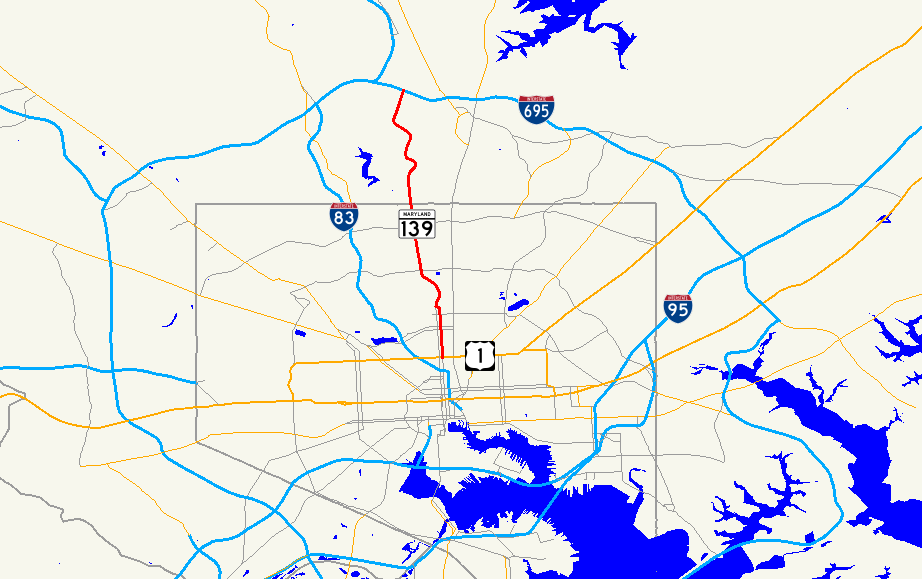

Route information
- Maintained by MDSHA and Baltimore DOT
- Length: 10.9 mi (17.5 km) MD 139 is 7.89 mi (12.70 km). The unnumbered portion of Charles Street south of US 1 is 3.0 mi (4.8 km).
- Existed: 1927–present
- Tourist routes: Baltimore's Historic Charles Street

Major junctions
- South end: Dead end near Wells Street in Baltimore
- MD 2 in Baltimore; US 40 in Baltimore; I-83 in Baltimore; US 1 / US 40 Truck in Baltimore; MD 134 in Towson; I-695 in Lutherville
- North end: Nightlingale Way in Lutherville

Location
- Country: United States
- State: Maryland
- Counties: City of Baltimore, Baltimore

Highway system
- Maryland highway system; Interstate; US; State; Scenic Byways
← MD 138	→ MD 140

Charles Street, known for most of its route as Maryland Route 139 (MD 139), runs through Baltimore and the Towson area of Baltimore County. On the north end, it terminates at an intersection with Bellona Avenue near Interstate 695 (I-695). At the south end, it terminates in Federal Hill in Baltimore. Charles Street is one of the major routes through Baltimore, and is a major public transportation corridor. For the one-way portions of Charles Street, the street is functionally complemented by the parallel St. Paul Street, including St. Paul Place and Preston Gardens, Maryland Avenue, Cathedral Street, and Liberty Street.

Though not exactly at the west–east midpoint of the city, Charles Street is the dividing line between the west and east sides of Baltimore. On any street that crosses Charles Street, address numbers start from the unit block on either side, and the streets are identified as either "West" or "East," depending on whether they are to the west or east of Charles.

The west and east designations also apply to streets that do not cross Charles Street, but exist on both sides of it. The entire length of Charles Street is a National Scenic Byway known as Baltimore's Historic Charles Street.

== Route description ==
MD 139 begins at US 1/US 40 Truck in Baltimore (better known as North Avenue). MD 139 follows Charles Street northbound; the southbound lanes of MD 139 are carried by Saint Paul Street. Charles Street is a part of the National Highway System from Pratt Street to its northern terminus in Lutherville, which includes the entire length of MD 139.

=== South Baltimore to North Avenue ===
Charles Street begins at a dead end one block south of Wells Street in the South Baltimore neighborhood of Baltimore. The terminus is immediately to the north of CSX's Locust Point Branch of the Baltimore Terminal Subdivision railroad line and I-95 and two blocks to the west of the historic National Enameling and Stamping Company factory complex. Charles Street heads north as a two-lane undivided street through residential South Baltimore. The street becomes commercial as it passes between the Federal Hill and Sharp Leadenhall neighborhoods. Federal Hill contains the Holy Cross Roman Catholic Church on West Street and the Cross Street Market on the eponymous street. Sharp Leadenhall contains the Little Montgomery Street Historic District. At the north end of the two neighborhoods, Charles Street intersects MD 2, which follows Montgomery Street east and Hughes Street west on its two-block transfer from Hanover Street, which the route follows south toward the Hanover Street Bridge over the Patapsco River, to Light Street at the southwest corner of the Inner Harbor. Charles Street enters the Otterbein neighborhood, where it becomes one-way northbound at Lee Street. At the northern end of the neighborhood, Charles Street intersects Conway Street, a four-block boulevard that passes the Otterbein Church and connects Light Street at the Inner Harbor with I-395 and Howard Street just east of the Baltimore & Ohio Warehouse at Camden Yards and Oriole Park at Camden Yards, home to Major League Baseball's Baltimore Orioles.

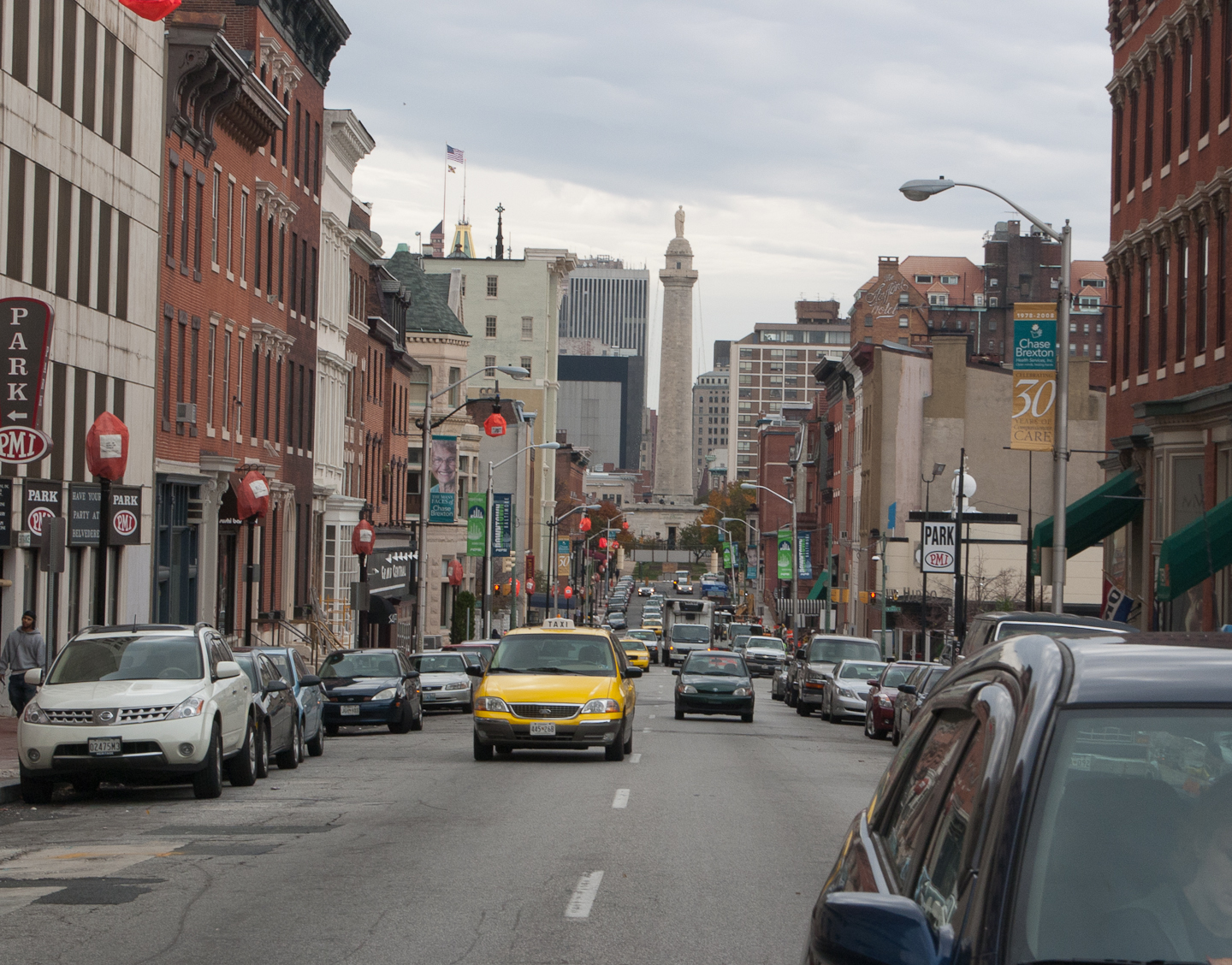
Charles Street looking south from Chase Street in Baltimore

Charles Street continues north as a three-lane street through the Inner Harbor neighborhood on the south side of downtown Baltimore. The street passes to the east of the Baltimore Convention Center and intersects the two main streets of the Inner Harbor area, eastbound Pratt Street and westbound Lombard Street, between which is the Transamerica Tower (formerly the Legg Mason Building). Charles Street passes to the west of the M&T Bank Building and Bank of America Building before reaching the center of the city's address system at Baltimore Street. The street passes to the east of Charles Center and the Charles Center station of MTA Maryland's Baltimore Metro SubwayLink. Charles Street continues north into the Cathedral Hill Historic District, where the street passes St. Paul's Episcopal Church at Saratoga Street, the Woman's Industrial Exchange and Brown's Arcade at Pleasant Street, the Baltimore Basilica at Mulberry Street, and the Benson Building and First Unitarian Church of Baltimore at Franklin Street. Mulberry and Franklin streets carry US 40 eastbound and westbound, respectively.

Charles Street enters the Mount Vernon neighborhood at Centre Street, which contains the Walters Art Museum and Contemporary Museum Baltimore to the west. The street splits into a pair of two-lane roadways separated by park squares known as Washington Place. South of the east–west portion of the park, Charles Street passes the equestrian Lafayette Monument within the park and the Peabody Institute on the east and the Walters Art Museum on the west. The street meets the westbound and eastbound halves of Mount Vernon Place, (also East and West Monument Street) which flank the east–west segment of the part, at a traffic circle that surrounds the Washington Monument. The eastern leg of the park contains the George Peabody Sculpture and one of Severn Teackle Wallis facing St. Paul Street to the east. The bifurcated Charles Street continues past the Roger B. Taney Sculpture in the northern square of the park, Mount Vernon Place United Methodist Church and Asbury House to the east, and The Stafford Apartments to the west and the equestrian statue of Col. John Eager Howard facing north towards Madison Street. The two halves of Charles Street converge as a three-lane street at Madison Street.

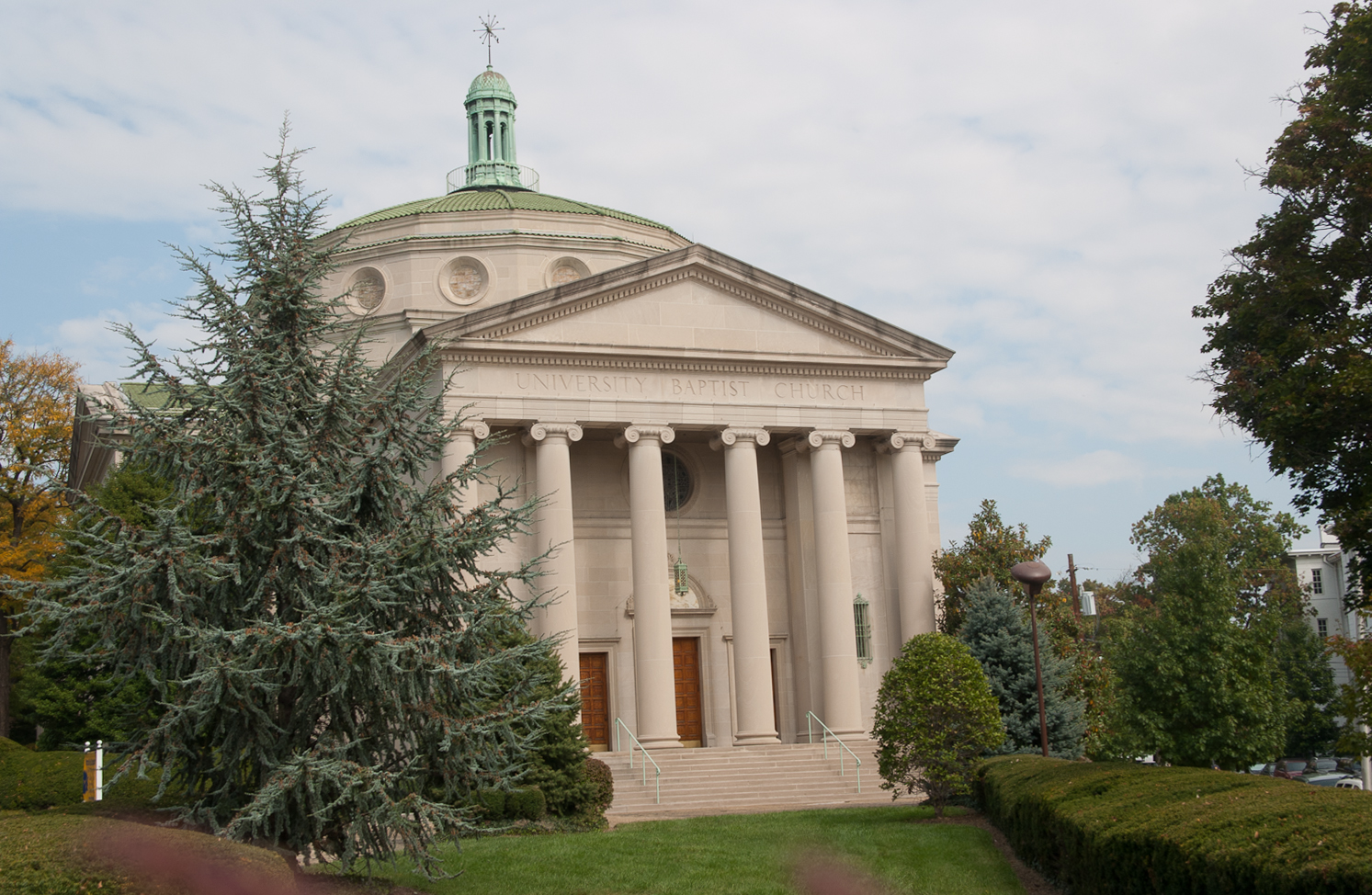
University Baptist Church across from Johns Hopkins University

Charles Street continues through midtown Baltimore, which contains the Belvedere Hotel and several historic rowhouses on adjacent Chase Street. The street passes along the east side of the University of Baltimore and University of Baltimore School of Law before meeting I-83 (Jones Falls Expressway) at the northern end of the neighborhood. The partial interchange with I-83 features ramps from southbound I-83 to Maryland Avenue one block to the west and to Charles Street itself, and an entrance ramp from Charles Street to northbound I-83. Immediately to the east of the I-83 overpass is Pennsylvania Station, the main train station of Baltimore that has intercity service on Amtrak, commuter service on MARC's Penn Line, and light rail service on the Penn Station spur of MTA Maryland's Baltimore Light RailLink. Charles Street crosses over several tracks of Amtrak's Northeast Corridor railroad line and enters the Charles North neighborhood. Between Lanvale and Lafayette streets, which form the east and west components of MD 25 (which becomes Falls Road), the street passes the Charles Theatre and the Baltimore City Passenger Railway Power House and Car Barn. Charles Street continues one more block as an unnumbered highway before reaching the southern terminus of MD 139 at North Avenue, which carries US 1 and US 40 Truck.

=== North Avenue to Lutherville ===
Charles Street continues as northbound MD 139 through the Charles North neighborhood, where the street passes the Old Goucher College Buildings. The street is paralleled by Maryland Avenue to the west and St. Paul Street to the east, the latter being southbound MD 139. Charles Street continues into Charles Village. At 29th Street, Maryland Avenue merges into Charles Street, which becomes a divided boulevard that contains three lanes northbound and one lane southbound. St. Paul Street, which serves as the main commercial street of the neighborhood, becomes two lanes southbound and one lane northbound at 31st Street and passes Union Memorial Hospital. The boulevard passes between the main part of Charles Village and auxiliary Johns Hopkins University buildings to the east and the Baltimore Museum of Art and the Homewood Campus of Johns Hopkins University, and the campus's Homewood Museum to the west. North of 33rd Street, Charles and St. Paul streets enter the Homewood neighborhood, where they each have oblique intersections with University Parkway, which leads northwest to the First Church of Christ, Scientist and the Lacrosse Museum and National Hall of Fame at the northern end of the Hopkins campus.

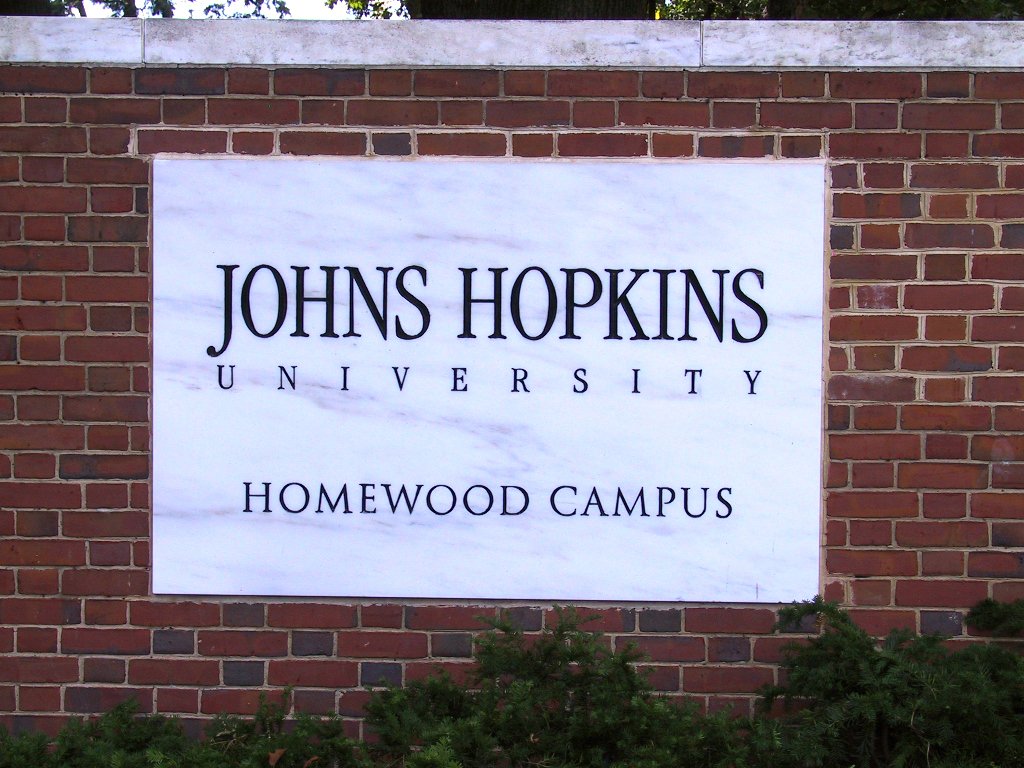
A sign for Johns Hopkins University

Charles Street and St. Paul Street continue north as two-way, four-lane streets through the well wooded residential neighborhoods of Tuscany-Canterbury to the west of Charles Street and Guilford to the east. North of the Highfield House Condominium, Charles Street splits, with southbound traffic using Charles Street proper, which passes the Calvert School, and northbound traffic continuing straight on Charlcote Road, which intersects St. Paul Street, which had curved to the east and veered back northwest within the Guilford neighborhood. Both directions of MD 139 follow St. Paul Street to its northern end at Charles Street and Overhill Road. Two blocks north of the junction, four-lane undivided Charles Street intersects Cold Spring Lane. The street continues through the campus of Loyola University Maryland; the two sides of the campus are connected by a pedestrian bridge. Charles Street passes the Evergreen Museum & Library before passing between the Blytheville neighborhood to the west and Notre Dame of Maryland University (formerly College of Notre Dame of Maryland, or CONDOM). Charles Street continues north between Homeland and Wyndhurst, the latter the home of the Friends School of Baltimore and the Cathedral of Mary Our Queen. The street intersects Northern Parkway and Lake Avenue, which leads to the Boys' Latin School of Maryland, and passes between two more neighborhoods, The Orchards to the west and Bellona-Gittings to the east, before leaving Baltimore and entering Baltimore County.

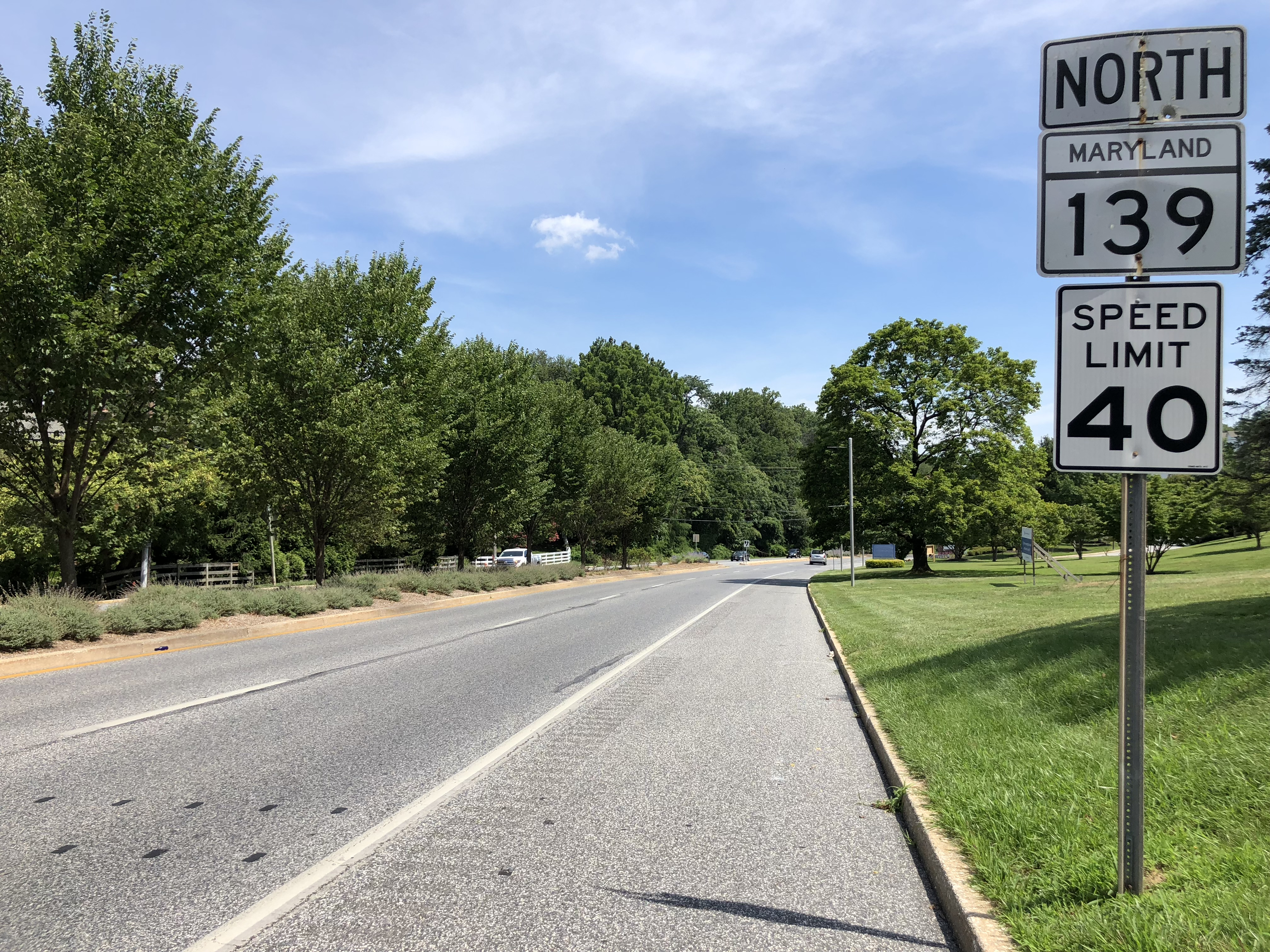
MD 139 north of MD 134 in Towson

North of Elkridge Hunt Club, whose golf course lies to the west, Charles Street passes through the hamlet of Woodbrook, within which lies the historic home Tyrconnell on Lake Roland to the west. At Bellona Avenue, which heads northwest as MD 134, Charles Street becomes a four-lane divided highway that passes through an S-curve within a forested area. The highway passes to the west of Greater Baltimore Medical Center and The Sheppard and Enoch Pratt Hospital, then intersects Towsontown Boulevard, which leads to the old alignment of Charles Street, Charles Street Avenue, and both Towson University and the center of Towson. Charles Street veers northwest past the Loyola Blakefield school and north again to the top of a ridge where the highway passes under Joppa Road. That road is accessed at the following intersection with Bellona Road, which heads west and then south toward Riderwood and Ruxton, and Kenilworth Drive, which heads east toward the center of Towson. Charles Street has a partial cloverleaf interchange with I-695 (Baltimore Beltway) before meeting a disjoint segment of Bellona Avenue at an intersection with traffic lights (for the better part of a decade traffic was managed by a roundabout) on the southern edge of Lutherville. Bellona Avenue heads west toward a ramp to westbound I-695 and east to receive an exit ramp from westbound I-695 and intersect MD 131 (Seminary Avenue) within the Lutherville Historic District. Although MD 139 ends at the intersection, Charles Street continues north one block as a residential street to its northern terminus, where the road heads west into an apartment complex as Nightingale Way.

== History ==
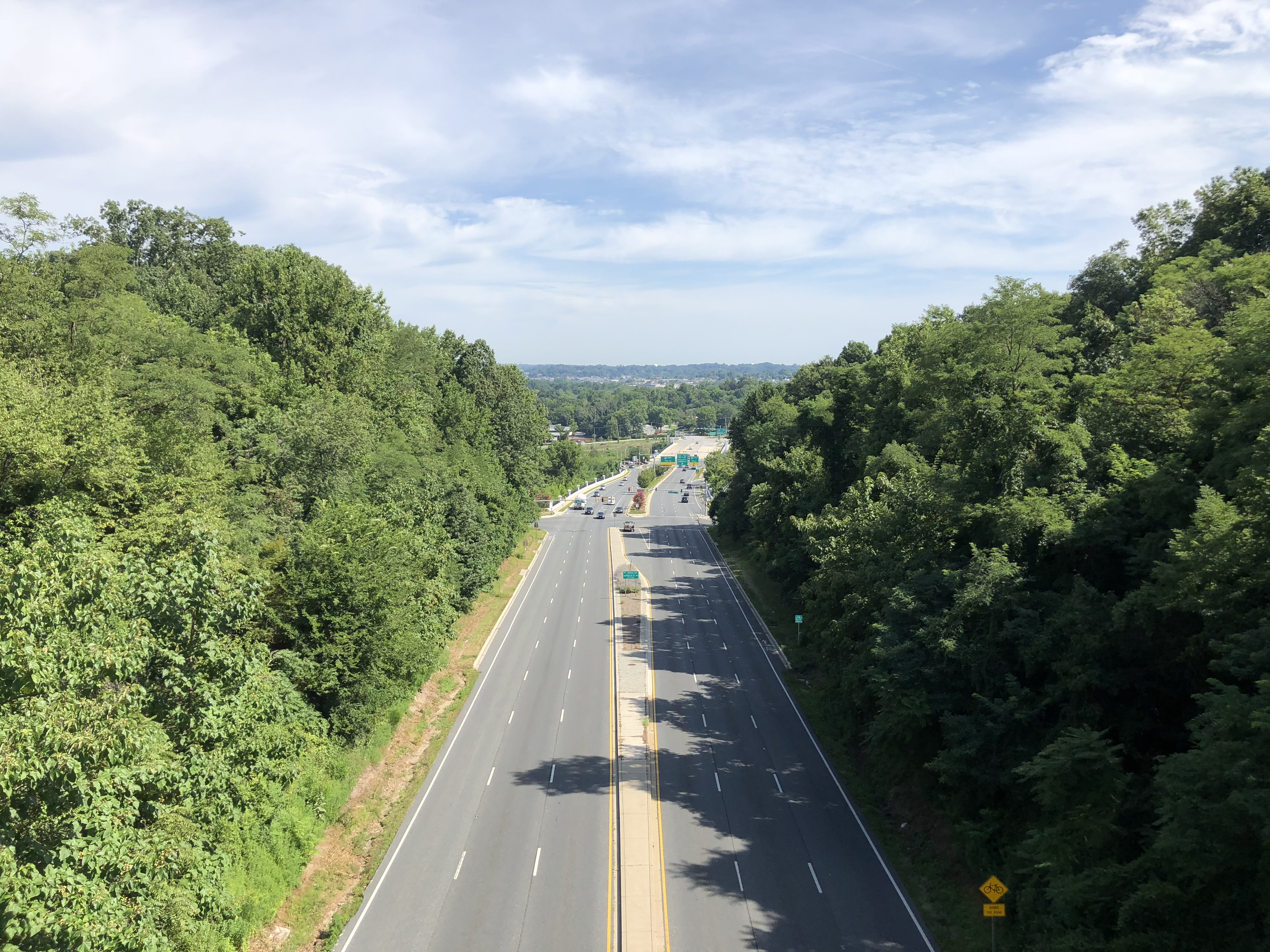
MD 139 northbound viewed from West Joppa Road in Towson

When Charles Street was first laid out in the Town of Baltimore in 1730, it was originally known as Forest (or Forrest) Street. The southern end was at the present day Lombard Street at what was called Uhler's Spring Branch. The road was being referred to as Charles Street by at least 1761. In 1858, the Jones Falls flooded and overflowed. The bridge along Charles Street (near present-day Penn Station) was swept away.

The first portion of what was known as Charles Street Avenue to be paved in Baltimore County was west of the center of Towson, from Chesapeake Avenue north to Joppa Road, by 1915. The remainder of the highway in Baltimore County was paved in 1928 and marked as MD 139 by 1933. By 1934, traffic levels were high enough on the highway that the Maryland State Roads Commission recommended widening the road in Baltimore County from 14 to 20 feet (4.3 to 6.1 m) to 30 feet (9.1 m) in width. Within Baltimore, MD 139 was split into a one-way pair between North Avenue and 29th Street, with northbound following Charles Street and southbound using Maryland Avenue, by 1950.

In 1954, a project began to widen MD 139 from the Baltimore city line north to MD 134. In addition, preliminary work began at the site of the highway's future interchange with I-695 that year and actual construction began in 1955. Starting in 1956, MD 139 was expanded to a four-lane divided highway from MD 134 to the modern intersection with Towsontown Boulevard and relocated as a four-lane divided highway from there to the Beltway interchange. Construction was completed from the Beltway interchange south to Joppa Road and from MD 134 to Towsontown Boulevard in 1957. The relocation project, including Joppa Road's bridge over MD 139, was completed in 1958. The bypass was marked as MD 139 by 1959 and the old segment of Charles Street Avenue was transferred to county maintenance by 1961. In 1963, the southbound direction of the state highway was assigned to St. Paul Street from North Avenue to the street's northern end at Charles Street; the street was a two-way divided boulevard north of 33rd Street.

The intersection with Bellona Avenue at the state highway's northern terminus in Lutherville was replaced with a roundabout in 1999. This roundabout was later removed and replaced with a standard intersection as part of reconstruction of MD 139 and I-695 around their interchange that started in 2008.

== Junction list ==
This table only includes details for the portion of Charles Street designated MD 139.

County	Location	mi	km	Destinations	Notes
Baltimore City				Charles Street continues south as an unnumbered city street through Downtown Baltimore for 3.0 miles (4.8 km) toward the street's southern terminus at a dead end near Wells Street.	
Baltimore City		0.00	0.00	US 1 / US 40 Truck (North Avenue)	Southern terminus
Baltimore City		1.50	2.41	University Parkway	
Baltimore City		2.48	3.99	Cold Spring Lane	
Baltimore City		3.62	5.83	Northern Parkway	
Baltimore	Towson	5.04	8.11	MD 134 north (Bellona Avenue) / Bellona Avenue south	Southern terminus of MD 134
Baltimore	Lutherville	7.80	12.55	I-695 (Baltimore Beltway) to I-83 – York, PA, Pikesville, Baltimore, Essex	I-695 Exit 25
Baltimore	Lutherville	7.89	12.70	Bellona Avenue / Charles Street north	Northern terminus; intersection; Bellona Avenue is unsigned MD 139A (east)
1.000 mi = 1.609 km; 1.000 km = 0.621 mi

== Auxiliary routes ==
MD 139 has one current and one former auxiliary route in Lutherville. Both routes were designated in 2004 as notational upgrades to what were previously classified as ramps.

- MD 139A is the designation for the 0.07-mile (0.11 km) section of Bellona Avenue from the northern terminus of MD 139 east to the exit ramp from westbound I-695.
- MD 139B was the designation for the 0.13-mile (0.21 km) section of Bellona Avenue from the northern terminus of MD 139 west to the entrance ramp to westbound I-695. The route was decommissioned in 2012 following the transfer of the road to county maintenance.
