= Gittings =

Gittings is an English/Welsh name. It can refer to:

- Gittings family, prominent and wealthy family in Baltimore, Maryland
  - Barbara Gittings (1932-2007), gay rights activist
- Bellona–Gittings, Baltimore, neighborhood
  - Bellona–Gittings Historic District
- Bill Gittings (1938-2019), English rugby player
- Gittings Studios, American photo studio founded by Paul Gittings, Sr.
- Robert Gittings (1911-1992), English writer
- John Gittings, British journalist
