= Lake Roland (Maryland) =

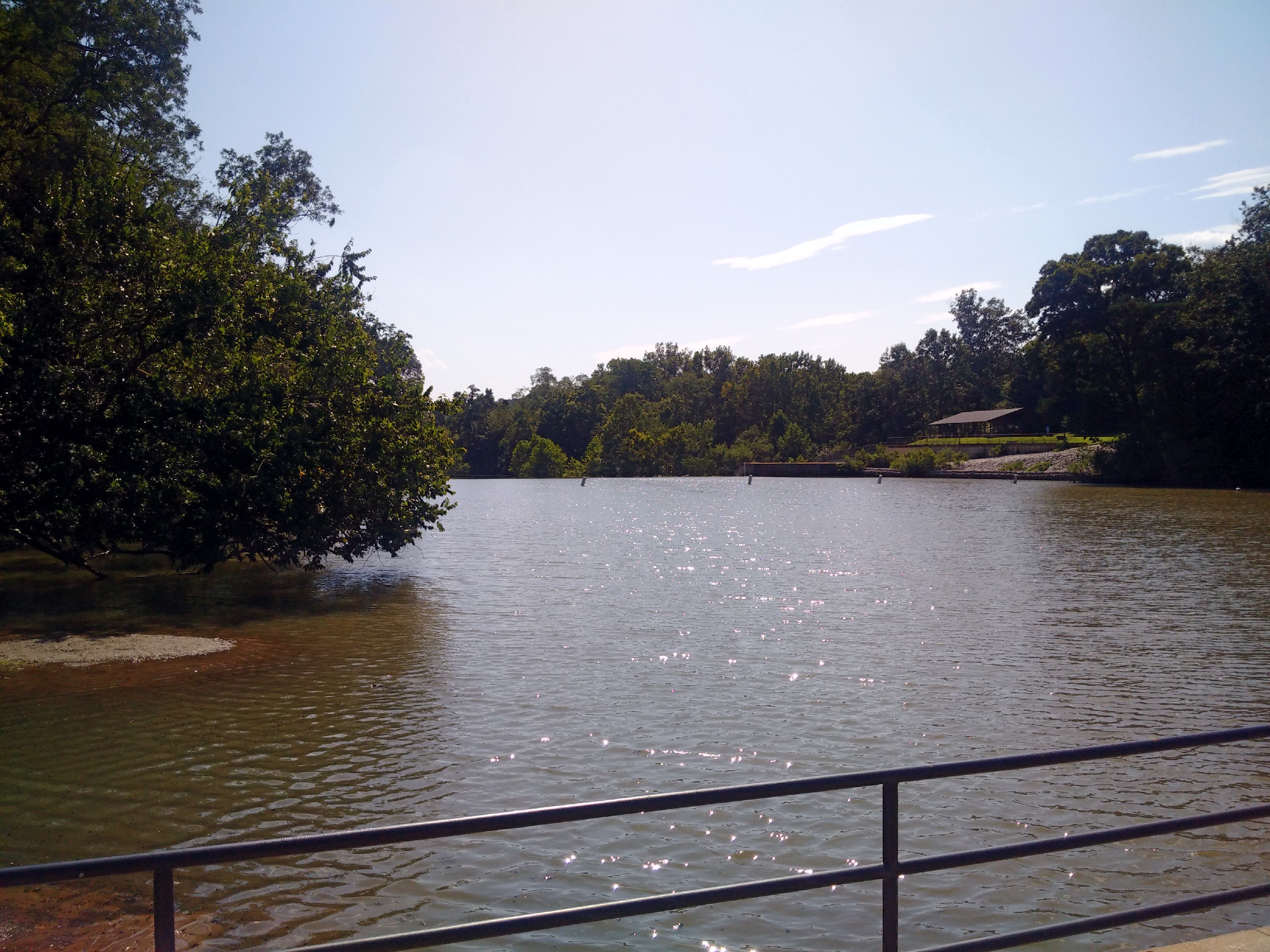
- Lake Roland

- Location within Maryland Location within the United States
- Location: Towson, Baltimore County, Maryland
- Coordinates: 39°23′10″N 76°38′39″W
- Type: reservoir
- Primary inflows: Jones Falls, Towson Run, Roland Run
- Primary outflows: Jones Falls
- Basin countries: United States
- Surface area: 100 acres (40 ha)
- Surface elevation: 246 ft (75 m)

Lake Roland is a 100-acre (0.40 km^{2}) defunct reservoir in Baltimore County, Maryland. It was named for Roland Run, a nearby stream that feeds the lake and eventually flows into Jones Falls. It runs southeast through the city center to the Northwest Branch of the Patapsco River and the Baltimore Harbor. It is located just north of the Baltimore city limits.

The lake is contained within the bounds of Lake Roland Park, which was established in the 1920s and supervised by the newly organized Baltimore City Department of Parks and Recreation. The lake is an artificial impoundment created by a dam on the Jones Falls and two smaller streams, Towson Run and Roland Run. The lake supports wildlife including Canada geese, largemouth bass, and common carp. The lake is part of the Lake Roland Historic District.

== History ==
The lake was once called Lake Swann to honor Mayor Thomas Swann of Baltimore City, who had begun the construction of the dam at the relay house on the Northern Central Railroad. The name Roland comes from Roland Run, which was named sometime before 1694 when Roland or Rowland Thornberry owned land in the area.

In 1854, the City of Baltimore bought the holdings of the privately owned Baltimore Water Company, which had supplied water to the city for fifty years, followed between 1854 and 1857 by acquisition of the land held by the Bellona Gunpowder Mill and the Eagle Factory textile mill for $289,000. This purchase followed a political controversy regarding the failure of the water company to extend new water lines into surrounding outlying areas of the city. The city had added territory in its last annexation in 1818. The Bellona Gunpowder Mill, which had operated from at least 1801 on the west side of the lake, and the Eagle Factory, which had operated there since at least 1814, were displaced by the land purchase, while the Baltimore & Susquehanna Railroad stayed in place. The railroad was later destroyed by pro-Confederate forces during the American Civil War and reconstructed by pro-Union forces as they advanced southward.

Engineer James Slade, from Hartford, Connecticut, who improved the existing network based on "old Jones Falls mill ponds", and construction supervisor Charles P. Manning began construction in 1858, with the creation of an "indestructible" dam made out of "heavy rubble work". In 1861, Lake Roland became the first municipal water supply for the City of Baltimore; it was seen as an "engineering landmark" at the time. The dam and Greek Revival-style pump building on the eastern shore of the lake were constructed the following year. While plans to tap the Gunpowder River stopped with new reservoirs in the city and stopgap measures at Lake Roland, by 1877, Lake Roland was fed by the river, with the idea for this change likely coming from Slade rather than Henry Tyson, another engineer; a pipe served as a conduit of water between Lake Roland and Hampton Reservoir, among other bodies of water.

Lack of water was not the only problem the lake experienced. At times, the water was "clouded or turbid from rain-borne particles" as dredging was attempted to make the reservoir deeper. Increased mud and silt closed the lake for hundreds of days by 1912, accompanied by costs in the thousands of dollars for upkeep. One Baltimore County newspaper in 1877 described the lake as a "receptacle of filth" from nearby industry, including the junction of the Northern Central Railroad and Green Spring Railway, and declared that "Towsontowners never drink any water when they get into the city", even as others admired the lake as a "charming scene."

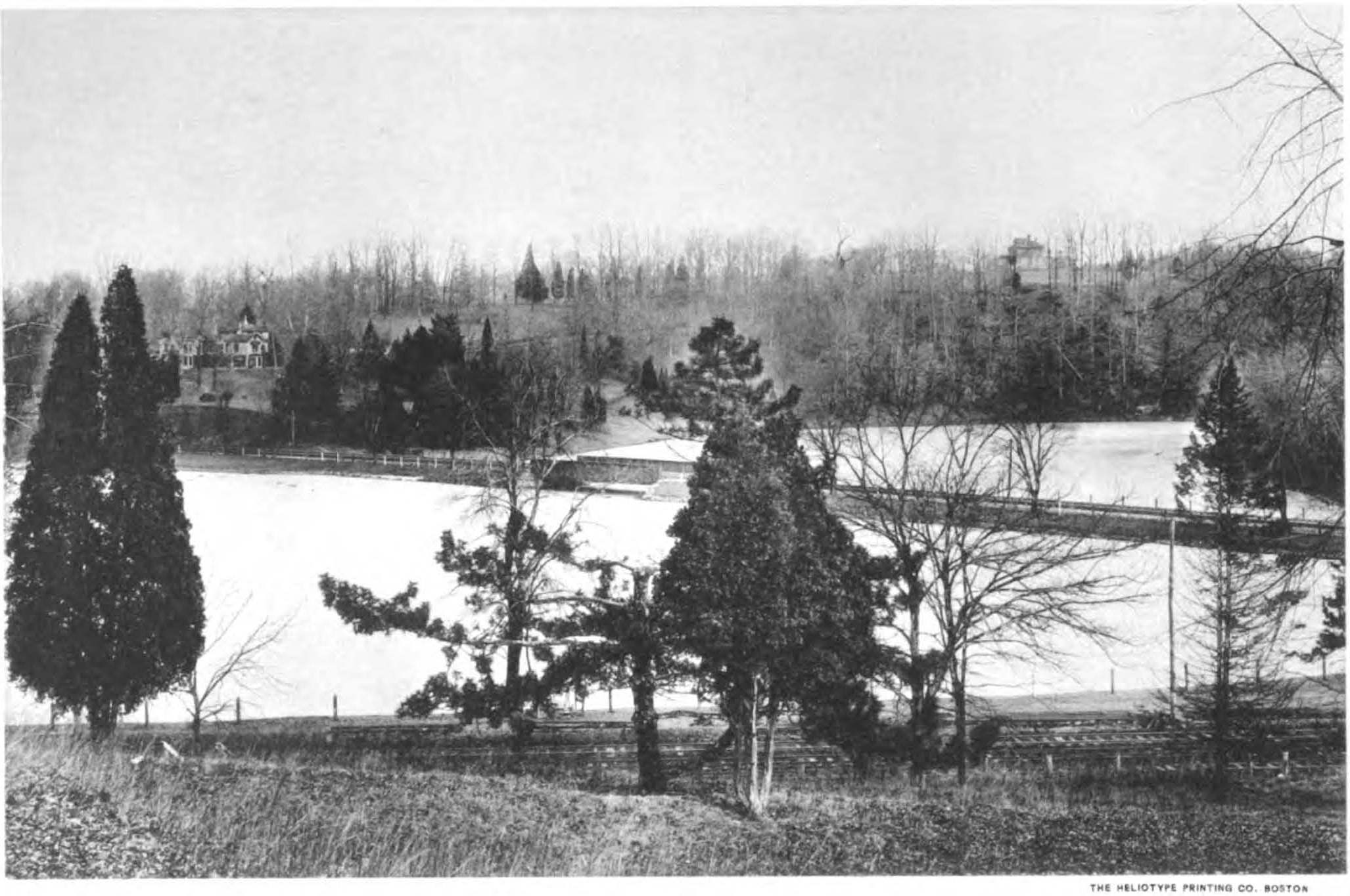
Lake Roland in about 1898

Still, by 1893 some were admiring Lake Roland. One publication called it "one of our reservoirs", saying that it was "well-stocked with Black Bass and Carp" while noting that least terns, American black ducks, green herons, great blue herons, black-crowned night herons, semipalmated sandpipers, buffleheads, and many other birds could be seen in the reservoir. It was around this time that the Lake Roland Elevated Railway, created in 1891, ferried commuters "from the city to Roland Park," with some going to Left Side Park, a park that was near the lake. The railway lasted until the 1950s.

However, due to the problems the reservoir experienced, it was eventually abandoned for its original purpose. On November 19, 1915, due to silting problems and the creation of the much larger Loch Raven Reservoir the prior year, the lake's use was terminated, apart from its use again on December 2 that year. The following year, some parts of the lake were sold to the L'Hirondelle Club and the county's division of the water department was established, with the county's water engineer seeing the lake as an "emergency backup" for the city's water.

While the lake came under the management of the City of Baltimore in 1918, not much changed in its status. In 1971, Nancy Marcus and other undergraduate researchers from Goucher College and Towson University conducted a study entitled "An Analysis on the Degradation of Lake Roland." The students received a $13,140 grant from the National Science Foundation to complete the investigation under the guidance of Goucher biology professor John W. Foerster. In the years following, the iron bridge crossing the lake was sold for scrap. With the construction of I-695 and the Jones Falls Expressway and the expansion of Towson University, silt in Lake Roland increased until it comprised 60% of its volume by 1974. Some ruins of the past railroad, mills, and reservoir use could be found in the area in the late 1970s, with unsubstantiated claims of artifacts from a camp of Chinese laborers who would have been working on the railroad. Since 1986, elevated levels of chlordane in the flesh of the lake's fish have resulted in the issuance of a fish consumption advisory and the classification of the lake as a water-quality impaired segment.

== Geographic location ==
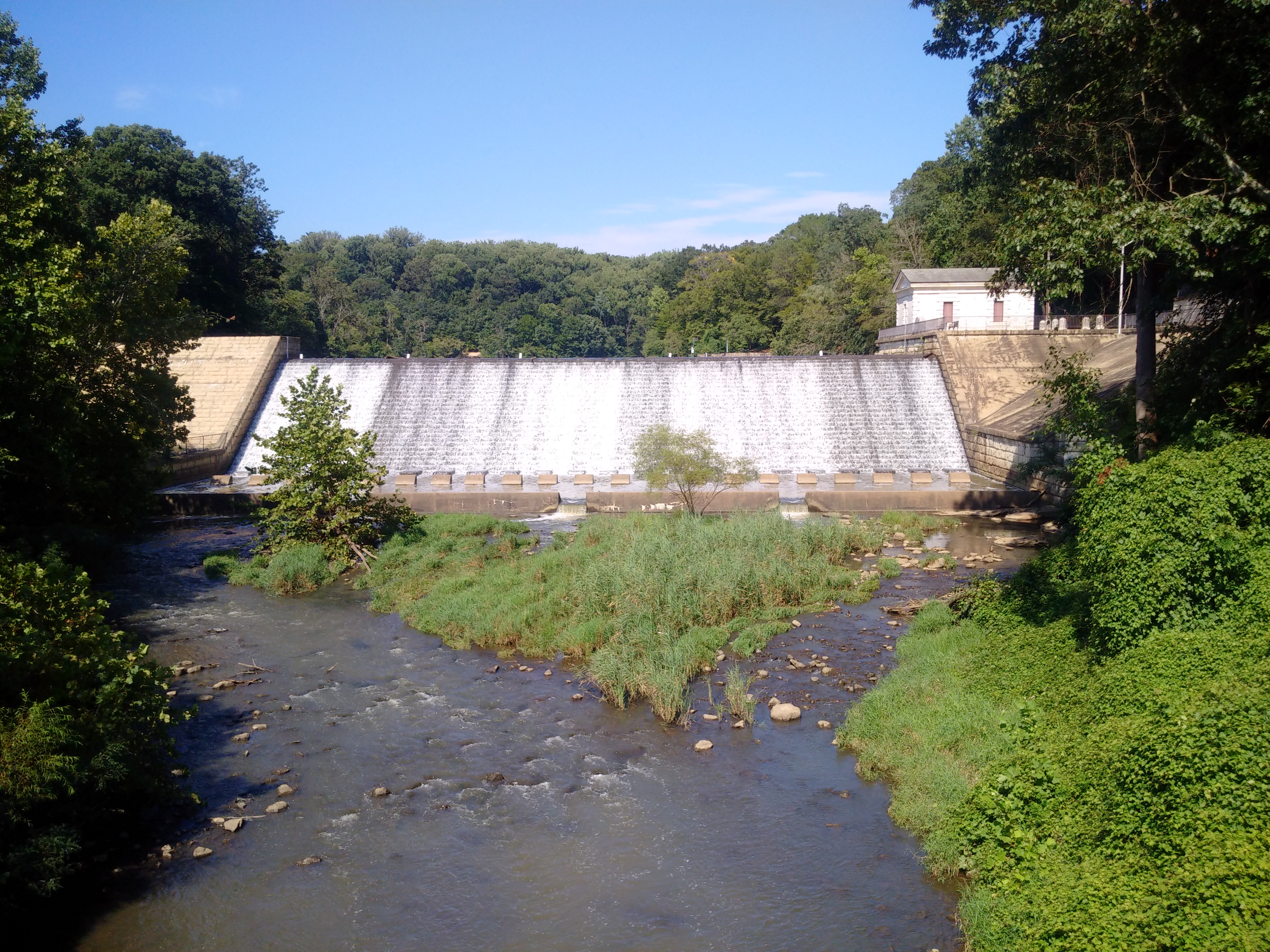
Lake Roland dam in 2019. The outflow is the Jones Falls

Some of the wealthiest and most desirable communities in the Baltimore area adjoin the park. The L'Hirondelle Club was founded by wealthy members of the local community for rowing on the lake. It is bounded in Baltimore County by Ruxton-Riderwood to the north, Woodbrook to the east, and north Roland Park–Poplar Hill to the south. Farther to the south are the wealthy Baltimore City neighborhoods of Roland Park, Homeland, and Guilford.

The park is also bounded on the west by the former mining community of Bare Hills, one of the oldest free African-American settlements in the area.

To the west and southwest of the lake are the remains of the Greenspring Branch railroad and the Northern Central Railroad, which was formerly the Baltimore and Susquehanna Railroad. The remains include the station/junction, known as the "Relay House", which burned in 1869. (Note: The Relay House is not to be confused with a more famous "Relay" in the southwest of the city for the Baltimore and Ohio Railroad between its Washington Branch to the south and the Main Line going west to Harpers Ferry and Ohio.)

The Baltimore Light RailLink runs along a track embankment and plate girder bridge through the middle of the lake's lower portion, above the dam.
