= Maryland Route 134 =

State highway in Baltimore County, Maryland, known as Bellona Ave

Maryland Route 134
- Bellona Avenue
- Maryland Route 134 highlighted in red

Route information
- Maintained by MDSHA
- Length: 1.63 mi (2.62 km)
- Existed: 1928–present

Major junctions
- South end: MD 139 in Towson
- North end: Ruxton Road in Ruxton

Location
- Country: United States
- State: Maryland
- Counties: Baltimore

Highway system
- Maryland highway system; Interstate; US; State; Scenic Byways
← MD 133	→ MD 135

Maryland Route 134 (MD 134) is a signed state highway in the U.S. state of Maryland. Known as Bellona Avenue, the state highway runs 1.63 miles (2.62 km) from MD 139 in Towson north to Ruxton Road in Ruxton in central Baltimore County. MD 134 was created as a modern road from MD 139 northwest to MD 25 in 1928. The highway was reduced to its present length in 1962.

== Route description ==
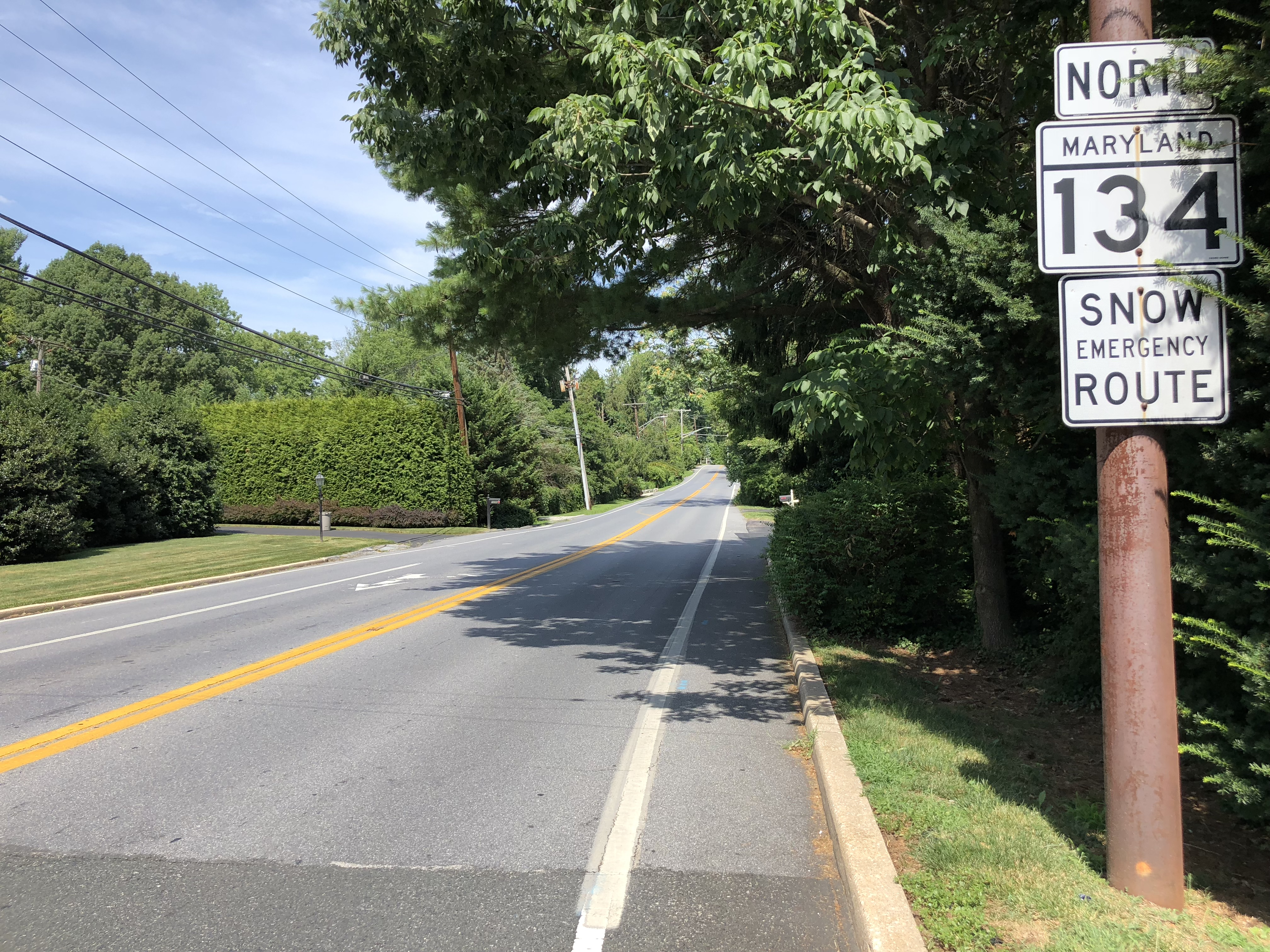
MD 134 northbound at MD 139 in Towson. This signage was removed in 2022 and then replaced in 2023.

MD 134 begins at MD 139 (Charles Street) in the southwestern part of Towson. Bellona Avenue continues southeast as a county road through Rodgers Forge and then a city street in Baltimore, ultimately ending at MD 45 (York Road). MD 134 heads west as a two-lane undivided road through a forested residential area. The state highway veers north near Lake Roland and begins to closely parallel MTA Maryland's Baltimore Light RailLink. MD 134 reaches its northern terminus in the village of Ruxton at an intersection with Ruxton Road, which heads west across the tracks toward Pikesville. Bellona Avenue continues north parallel to the light rail tracks as a county highway that intersects Joppa Road in Riderwood before veering east and intersecting MD 139 again just south of Interstate 695 (Baltimore Beltway). There is also a disjoint segment of Bellona Avenue north of the Beltway in Lutherville.

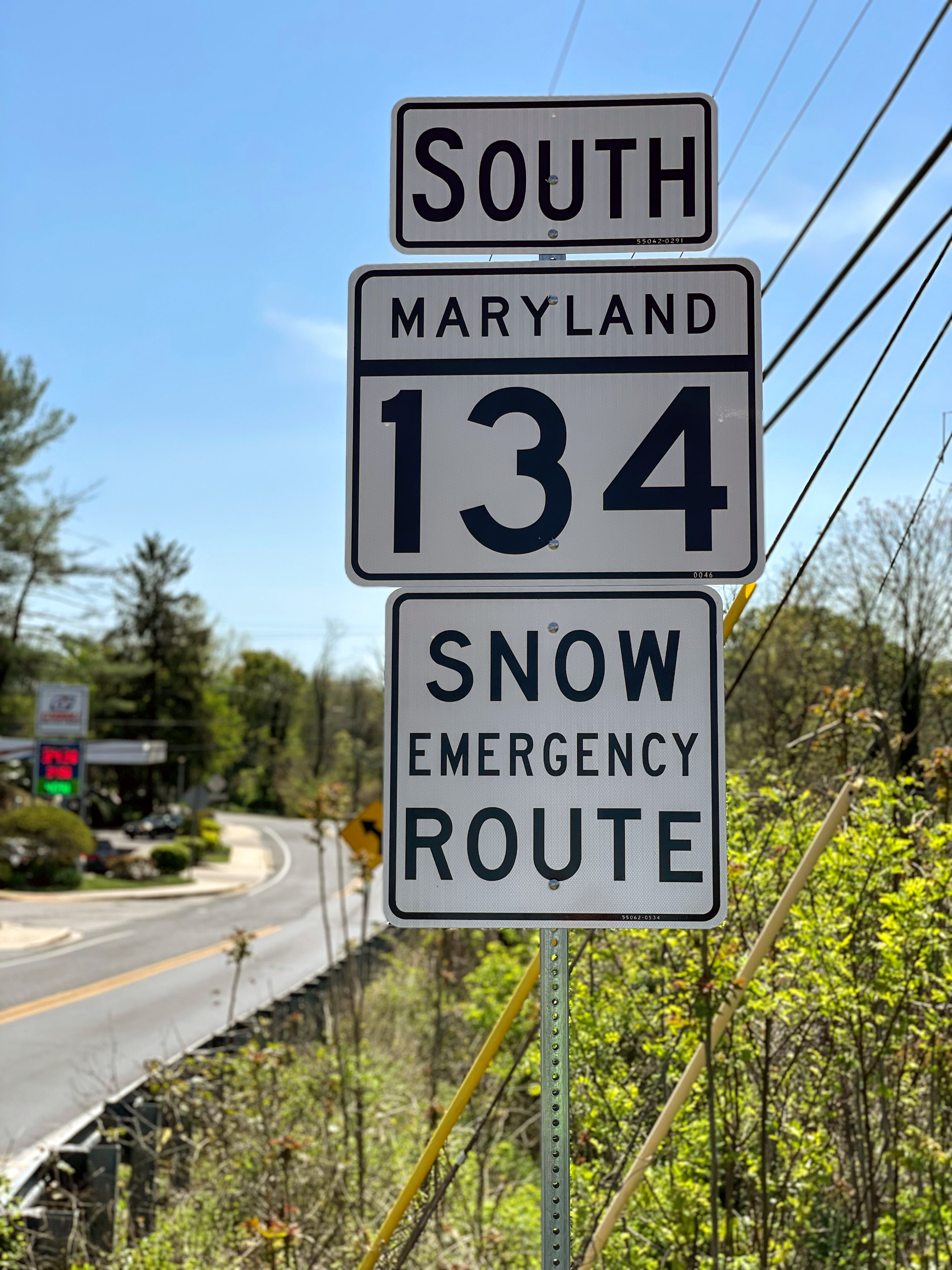
Close up shot of the MD 134 highway shield facing south at the intersection of Bellona Avenue and Ruxton Road

== History ==
MD 134 originally followed not only its present course along Bellona Avenue, but also Ruxton Road west to MD 25 in the hamlet of Rockland east of Pikesville. The whole original length of the highway was paved in macadam in 1928. The Ruxton Road portion of MD 134 was transferred to Baltimore County in 1962.

== Junction list ==
The entire route is in Baltimore County.

Location	mi	km	Destinations	Notes
Towson	0.00	0.00	MD 139 (Charles Street) / Bellona Avenue south – Baltimore, Lutherville	Southern terminus
Ruxton	1.63	2.62	Bellona Avenue north / Ruxton Road west – Pikesville	Northern terminus
1.000 mi = 1.609 km; 1.000 km = 0.621 mi
