= Ruxton-Riderwood, Maryland =

Unincorporated communities in Maryland, US

Coordinates: 39°24′00″N 76°38′41″W

Ruxton-Riderwood
- Unincorporated area
- Interactive map of Ruxton-Riderwood
- Country: US
- State: Maryland
- County: Baltimore County
- Established: 1694–1703

Population (2020)
  - Total: 21,378
- Time zone: UTC-5 (EST)
  - Summer (DST): UTC-4 (EDT)
- ZIP Codes: 21204
- Area code: Area code 410
- Website: rrlraia.org

Ruxton and Riderwood are unincorporated communities in Baltimore County, Maryland, United States. They are sometimes considered a part of Towson and are part of Towson's census area.

The boundaries of Ruxton have been established largely by local custom. Both the eastern boundary, Charles Street, and the western, Falls Road, are generally agreed upon. The northern and southern boundaries are somewhat imprecise. To the north and northwest, affiliation with Ruxton follows Joppa Road, the Old Court Road extension alongside the Jones Falls Expressway (I-83), and finally Ruxton Road to its intersection with Falls. A southern boundary can be discerned by drawing a crude line from the southerly intersection of Bellona Avenue (MD-134) and Charles to the intersection of West Lake Avenue and Falls. Riderwood's northern boundary is generally agreed upon as the Baltimore Beltway (I-695). To the southwest, south, and east, affiliation with Riderwood follows Joppa Road from its overpass of the Beltway to its bridge over Charles Street and along Charles Street to its interchange with the Beltway.

The commercial center of Ruxton, Ruxton Village, is centered around the intersection of Bellona Avenue and Ruxton Road. Riderwood hosts two smaller villages; one located along Bellona Avenue just north of its intersection with Joppa Road, and another centered around the intersection of Joppa and Thornton Roads. Ruxton is considered one of the most wealthiest neighborhoods in Towson.

== History ==
Ruxton takes its name from Nicholas Ruxton Moore, a captain and commander of the Baltimore Light Dragoons during the American Revolutionary War and a United States Congressman for Maryland's 5th District. He also participated in suppressing the Whiskey Rebellion in 1794, the same year he purchased the land that would become Ruxton. Riderwood takes its name from the family of Edward Rider, who obtained a 150-acre farm and mill near Thornton Road in 1824.

Ruxton was once the location of the country estates of Baltimore's wealthy landed gentry. Though the area became suburbanized during the course of the twentieth century, Ruxton is still considered one of the premier neighborhoods in the Baltimore area, along with Roland Park, Homeland, Guilford and the Falls Road corridor. Many of the original estates still remain, though there have been many new homes built between them. One 1905 home, formerly a railroad station, was designed by renowned Gilded Age architect Frank Furness.

Like much of Maryland, slavery was present in the Ruxton and Riderwood communities during the 18th century, despite local Quaker and Methodist resistance. In 1790, enslaved people comprised nearly 45% of the area's population. In 1833, J. Aquilla Scott, a free Black man, founded St. John's Church, a historic A.U.M.P. Church. The first iteration of the church burned down in 1876, and the subsequent 1886 structure was listed on the National Register of Historic Places in 1982.

President Abraham Lincoln traveled through Ruxton and Riderwood en route to Gettysburg, Pennsylvania, to deliver the Gettysburg Address in November, 1863. Less than two years later, on April 21, 1865, Lincoln's funeral train also passed through Ruxton and Riderwood on its way from Washington, D.C., to his final resting place at Springfield, Illinois.

In 1854, the neighborhood was the site of a train collision that killed 30 passengers. At the time, it was one of the worst railroad accidents in United States history.

== Transportation ==
=== Roads ===
==== Ruxton Road ====
Ruxton Road is a 1½-mile road, bearing the name of the area, and is the main west–east road running through the area. The road is mostly lined with upscale housing, but also has an interchange with the Jones Falls Expressway (exit 12). The road begins as a physical continuation to Old Court Road (though an extension to Old Court exists following a left turn), then continues past Bellona Avenue following a crossing over the track of the Light Rail finally ending at Malvern Avenue. There is no stop along the Light Rail at this point.

==== Bellona Avenue ====
Maryland Route 134, better known as Bellona Avenue is the main north–south road running through Ruxton and Riderwood. From the portion of Bellona Avenue through these communities, the track of the Light Rail is visible, though there are no stops. A small number of apartments and historic shopping districts can be found along Bellona Avenue, though the remainder of the road is mostly undeveloped.

==== West Joppa Road ====
West Joppa Road, a major cross-county artery, passes through Riderwood as it intersects with Bellona Avenue. The road is mostly lined with upscale housing. Joppa Road ends in the west at nearby Greenspring Station.

==== Falls Road ====
Maryland Route 25, better known as Falls Road, forms part of the western boundary of these communities, leading to the Brooklandville area. Though the road has a mostly sparse appearance, a small number of landmarks are visible in this area, including The Cloisters and Brightwood Nursing Home.

==== Charles Street ====
Maryland Route 139, better known as Charles Street, is said by many to form the eastern boundary of Ruxton. Several landmarks on this route, which intersects with I-695 in this area (exit 25), contain "Ruxton" in their name.

==== Thornton Road ====
Thornton Road connects the Riderwood neighborhood to Ruxton, reaching from West Joppa Road to the Mays Chapel area, stretching under the Baltimore Beltway. It provides access to Riderwood Elementary School and Village Green, its surrounding development, as well as Valley Country Club.

=== Public transportation ===
Prior to 1990, buses operated along Ruxton Road. However, bus service in the Ruxton area is very limited. LocalLink Route 34 operates on Falls Road on weekdays, though it is seldom used to reach this area. LocalLink Route 51 (formerly Route 11), which operates mostly along Charles Street, formerly operated two daily trips along Bellona Avenue through Ruxton running as Route 11A, though ridership in this area was very low. The service was discontinued after the redesign of the MTA bus system in 2017.

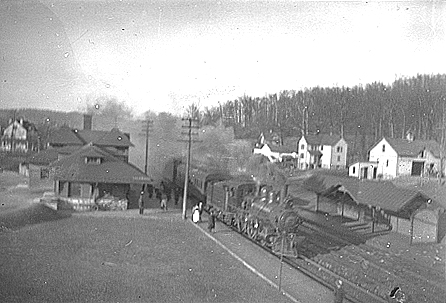
Passenger train at Riderwood station in 1917

A railroad has existed in Ruxton and Riverwood since 1831, when the Baltimore & Susquehanna Railroad was first built to Cockeysville, later becoming part of the Northern Central Railway. As a wholly owned subsidiary of the giant Pennsylvania Railroad in the 20th century, long-distance passenger trains passed over the line to Harrisburg, Pennsylvania, and beyond to Chicago, Buffalo, and St. Louis. In addition, local commuter trains stopped at stations in both Ruxton and Riverwood until 1959. Long-distance passenger train service ended in the late 1960s, although the Norfolk Southern Railway continued late-night freight operations until 2005, sharing the Light Rail Line as far as Cockeysville by agreement with the Maryland Transit Administration.

No Light Rail trains stop in Ruxton or Riderwood. Although stops were considered in the Ruxton and Riderwood areas when the light rail was proposed, these were fought by area residents.

== Schools ==
Ruxton is served by Riderwood Elementary School, Dumbarton Middle School, and Towson High School, all Blue Ribbon Schools in the Baltimore County Public Schools system. However, a large majority of Ruxton students attend area private schools such as St. Paul's School, Gilman School, Loyola Blakefield, Calvert Hall College High School, Roland Park Country School (RPCS), Friends School, McDonogh School, Bryn Mawr School, Boys' Latin School, and Garrison Forest School in Owings Mills.

== Recreation ==
The L'Hirondelle Country Club is located in Ruxton.

Valley Country Club is located in Riderwood, featuring a pool, tennis and basketball courts, and a mansion, formerly owned by NFL Hall of Famer and Baltimore Colts defensive tackle Art Donovan.

Lake Roland Park covers a large area in and around Ruxton. The park provides a densely wooded area containing hiking trails, a stream, and Lake Roland.

== Notable people ==
- Albert Blakeney (1850-1924), U.S. Representative for Maryland's 2nd District
- Julie Bowen (born 1970), television and film actress, winner of two Primetime Emmy Awards
- Bill Clifton (born 1931), bluegrass musician and singer
- James Devereux (1903-1988), United States Marine Corps general and U.S. Representative for Maryland's 2nd District
- George R. Hutchinson (1902-1989), aviator and media personality
- Annie Luetkemeyer (born 1972), physician and researcher
- M.E. (1994-current)

== In popular culture ==
The 1994 film Serial Mom was filmed in Ruxton at the Church of the Good Shepherd, on Boyce Avenue.

In 2005, Australian actress Nicole Kidman moved into Ruxton, renting a house in the Four Winds neighborhood on Boyce Avenue, as she shot The Invasion in Downtown Baltimore, opposite Daniel Craig.

Scenes in Runaway Bride with Julia Roberts and Richard Gere were shot at Gill's Garage on West Joppa Road.
