= The Orchards =

The Orchards can refer to:

- The Orchards at Ellerslie, Edmonton, a neighborhood in Edmonton, Alberta, Canada
- The Orchards, Baltimore, a neighborhood in Baltimore, Maryland
- The Orchards, New Jersey, an unincorporated community in Hamilton Township, Mercer County, New Jersey
- The Orchards Mall, a shopping mall in Benton Harbor, Michigan
- The Orchards, Gauteng, a suburb to the north of Pretoria, Gauteng, South Africa
- The Orchards (Vermont), a mansion in Bennington, Vermont designed by George Oakley Totten Jr.
