= Bellona–Gittings, Baltimore =

Bellona–Gittings
- neighborhood statistical area
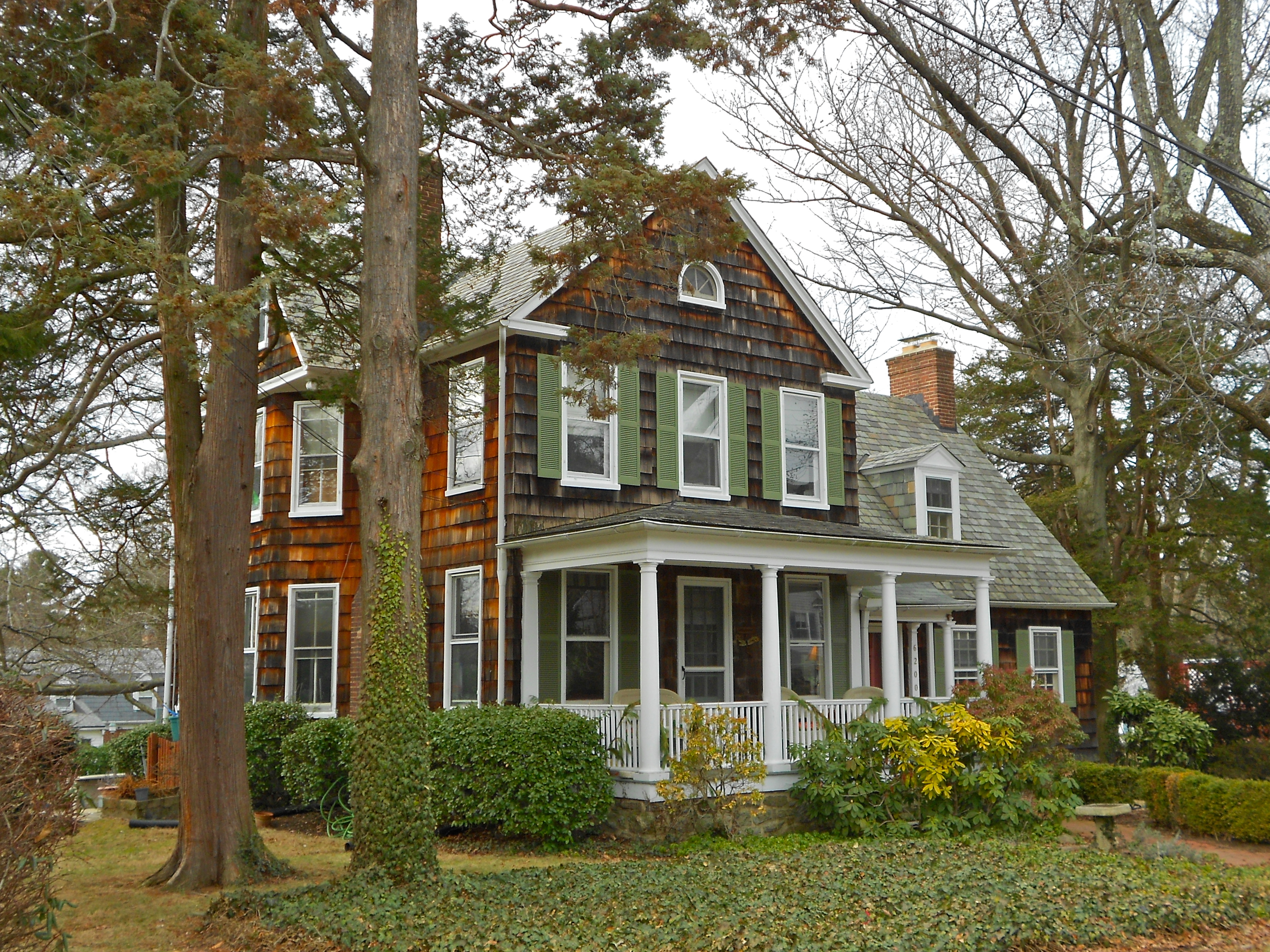
- House on the 6200 block of Mossway in Bellona-Gittings, Baltimore

- Location within Baltimore
- Coordinates: 39°22′7″N 76°37′21″W
- Country: United States
- State: Maryland
- City: Baltimore

Area
  - Total: 0.164 sq mi (0.42 km^{2})
  - Land: 0.164 sq mi (0.42 km^{2})

Population (2024)
  - Total: 430
  - Density: 2,600/sq mi (1,000/km^{2})
- Time zone: UTC-5 (Eastern)
  - Summer (DST): UTC-4 (EDT)
- ZIP code: 21212
- Area code: 410, 443, and 667

Bellona–Gittings is a neighborhood in the North District of Baltimore, located between the neighborhoods of Cedarcroft (east) and The Orchards (west). Its boundaries are marked by the Baltimore County line (north), East Melrose Avenue (south), Bellona Avenue (east) and North Charles Street (west). Many of the houses in this neighborhood were built from 1853 to 1956, with a wide variety of styles. Aside from one historic commercial building, the neighborhood is residential.

The Baltimore neighborhood of Bellona–Gittings is part of the Bellona–Gittings Historic District, which extends over the Baltimore County line to Charlesbrooke and Overbrook Roads to the north, and includes the Baltimore neighborhood of Cedarcroft to the east. Although the historic district overlaps jurisdictions, developer Philip E. Lamb designed its roads and houses in 1910 with a distinct, cohesive character. "Gittings" is named for the Gittings family, once one of the wealthiest families in the city, and one of the largest real estate holders.

== Demographics ==
Bellona–Gittings is a predominantly white neighborhood, with a population of 616 estimated in 2009. Median household income for the neighborhood, at $131,426 in 2009, was well over the citywide median of only $38,772. Only 4.4 percent of Bellona–Gittings families had incomes below the poverty level, while the citywide average for 2009 was at 22.9 percent. The average price of a single family home in Bellona–Gittings was $593,806, compared with the city's average price of $274,562.

According to 2024 data 79.1% of the population is white, 7.5% Black, 3.9% Asian, 1.9% Hispanic. The median household income in 2023 was $222,913.

== Public transportation ==
LocalLink 51 (BaltimoreLink) operates along Bellona Avenue, providing local bus service between Towson Town Center and Downtown Baltimore.

== See also ==
- List of Baltimore neighborhoods
- Bellona–Gittings Historic District
