= Wyndhurst, Baltimore =

Coordinates: 39°21′25″N 76°37′47″W

Wyndhurst
- Neighborhood of Baltimore
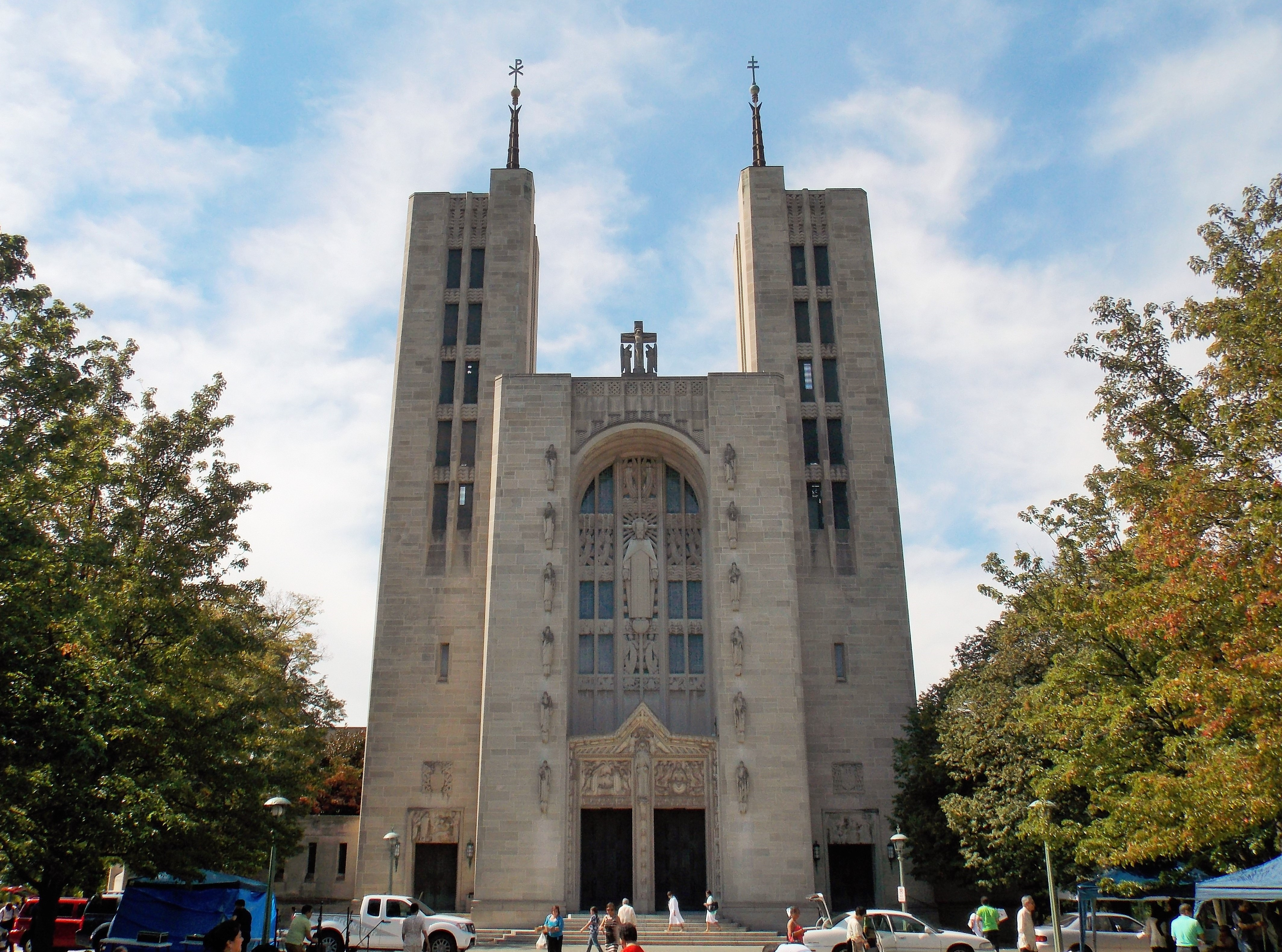
- Cathedral of Mary Our Queen at 5200 N. Charles Street in Wyndhurst, Baltimore

- Location within Baltimore
- Country: United States
- State: Maryland
- City: Baltimore

Area
  - Total: 0.383 sq mi (0.99 km^{2})
  - Land: 0.383 sq mi (0.99 km^{2})

Population (2008)
  - Total: 796
  - Density: 2,080/sq mi (802/km^{2})
- Time zone: UTC-5 (Eastern)
  - Summer (DST): UTC-4 (EDT)
- ZIP code: 21210
- Area code: 410, 443, and 667

Wyndhurst is a neighborhood located in the North District of Baltimore, Maryland.

Wyndhurst is a square-shaped piece of land bordered by Northern Parkway on the north, Charles Street on the east, Wyndhurst Avenue on the south and Roland Avenue on the west. It comprises Tuxedo Park and Embla Park, which contain over 300 houses, and is also home to four schools, two religious communities, and several commercial establishments.

Nicholas Fessenden, former president of the Wyndhurst Improvement Association, describes his community as such, "Tuxedo Park and Embla Park make up Wyndhurst as far as the residences are concerned," says Fessenden, "Then we have schools and institutions that are all part of the Wyndhurst neighborhood. Tuxedo Park and Embla Park are the older names, and together they make up Wyndhurst."

The former Maryland and Pennsylvania Railroad tracks serve as the dividing line between the two sub-neighborhoods. On the west lies Tuxedo Park, with Embla Park on the east. The tracks are also now used as part of a hiking and biking trail in the area.

== History ==
The entire 200-acre (0.81 km^{2}) area of Wyndhurst was purchased on October 12, 1694 by Stephen Benson, when it was known as Faux or Fox Hall. The land was passed from Benson to George Haddoway, who then sold it to John Bond in 1712. Bond sold the area land to Job Evans in 1727 who then sold it to Conrad Smith in 1758. In 1770, about 100 acres (0.40 km^{2}) of Wyndhurst were purchased or leased by Daniel Evans. Evans was an early leader in the Methodist community and founded the first Methodist society in Baltimore, building its first chapel on the property he purchased from Smith.

During the 1850s, W.C. Wilson owned most of the northern section known as Springvale while Michael Alder possessed "Cherry Hill" in the south. By 1877, the land had been divided into approximately four quadrants. In the southwest stood Tuxedo Park. Today, Tuxedo Park contains about 300 households but has still managed to maintain most of the same layout and street names that were used when the site was first developed by the Kansas City Land Company in 1892. At that time, the land was owned by Daniel Alder, a relative of Michael Alder. Officials at the time gave the streets English-sounding names, a reference to the previous century's rulers that is popular in residential areas in Baltimore. Gladstone Avenue, which runs through Roland Park, was likely named for 19th-century British prime minister William Ewart Gladstone.

By the turn of the century, over a dozen houses had been built along Wyndhurst Avenue, which was formerly called Cedar Lane. Other similar houses also began to pop up during this time as well in Tuxedo Park. The section likely gets its name from Tuxedo Park, New York, where Edward Bouton studied. Bouton, the first general manager of the Roland Park Company, was one of the primary developers of the area.

By 1912, about a third of the neighborhood had been developed; however, most of the houses and buildings were constructed during the 1920s in the classic two-story frame cottage style. While Tuxedo Park was being built in the southwest corner of Wyndhurst, Embla Park was being developed in the southeast portion. Compared with Tuxedo Park, the houses in the Embla section are larger and more were constructed before the dawn of the 20th century. Embla was listed in the 1887 Maryland State Office and Gazetteer, indicating that the neighborhood had its own post office.

The largest section of Wyndhurst, the northeast, was owned by David Perine, who later founded the Homeland section of the city. The land was sold to the Roland Park Company in 1924 and later became the plot on which the Cathedral for Mary our Queen and the Friends School were built.

Mrs. A.M. Evans owned the northwest section of the city, 60 acres (240,000 m^{2}) of which became home to the Gilman Country School for Boys in 1910. Gilman was the first private day school for boys in the United States. This section of Wyndhurst is now also home to Roland Park Public School.

== Wyndhurst Today ==
Despite all the changes over time, Wyndhurst still stands on the same hilly surface and thick vegetation it always has. The area has thrived in recent years and saw its average house jump from $160,200 in 1998 to $236,404 in 2000. This change reflects the growing desire to be part of a neighborhood that is close to the city (less than 15 minutes from downtown), yet maintains a rustic, natural appearance.

Many businesses that are associated with Roland Park today are actually part of the Wyndhurst neighborhood, including Eddie’s food market and the Roland Park Post Office. The Roland Park Pool is even located in the heart of Embla Park. Other commercial areas in Wyndhurst include offices and stores on Wyndhurst Ave. in Embla Park, as well as at the intersections of Lawndale and Summit avenues and at Roland Avenue and Deepdene Road.

== See also ==
- List of Baltimore neighborhoods
