= Little Montgomery Street Historic District =

Historic district in Maryland, United States

- U.S. National Register of Historic Places
- U.S. Historic district
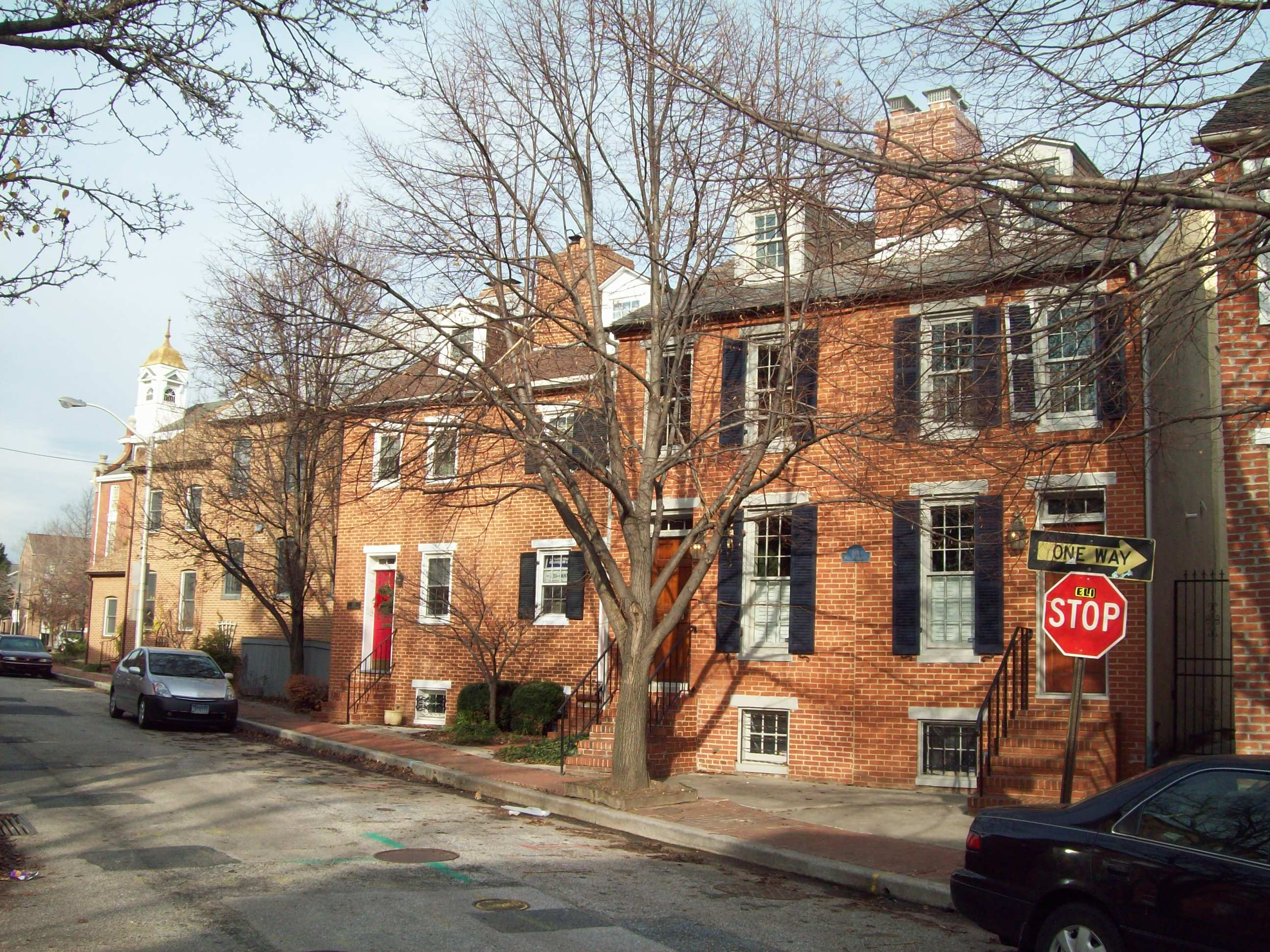
- Little Montgomery Street Historic District, December 2011

- Location within Baltimore
- Location: West Montgomery and Leadenhall Sts., Baltimore, Maryland
- Coordinates: 39°16′48″N 76°37′0″W
- Area: 2 acres (0.81 ha)
- Built: 1860
- Architect: Multiple
- NRHP reference No.: 82004748
- Added to NRHP: April 15, 1982

Little Montgomery Street Historic District is a national historic district in Baltimore, Maryland, United States. It is composed of approximately 15 19th century brick houses, some of which are double, that line the 100-block of West Montgomery Street and the northwestern portion of the 800 block of Leadenhall Street. All the buildings are small in scale and of brick construction, abut the sidewalks, are closely spaced, and are generally two to three stories high with two-bay façades. Nine of the structures are "half houses" that are only one room deep with a single pitch roof. The district is associated with a working class urban community where, throughout the 19th and early 20th centuries Baltimore's native poor, struggling German and Irish immigrants, and freed southern African Americans lived side by side competing for the same space and the same railroad and port-related jobs.

It was added to the National Register of Historic Places in 1982.
