= Lake Roland (park) =

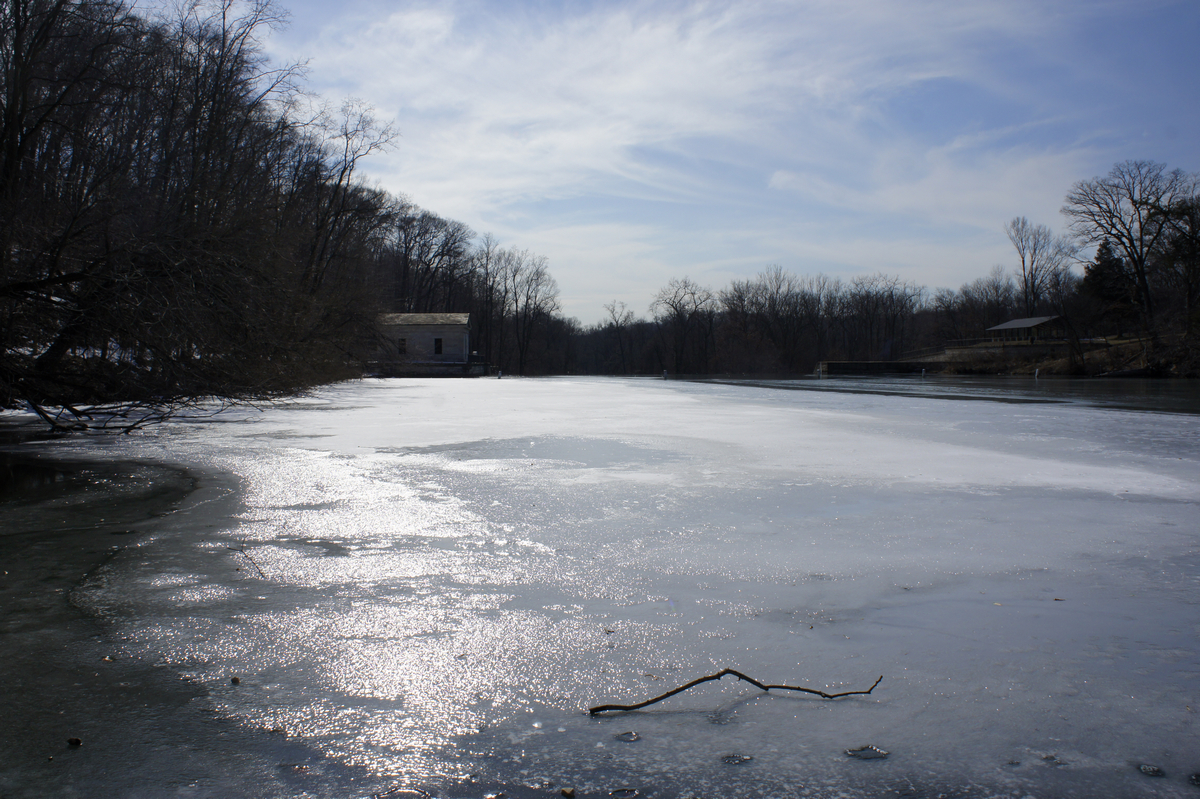
- Interactive map of Lake Roland
- Location: 1000 Lakeside Drive; Baltimore, MD 21210
- Area: 500 acres (200 ha)
- Created: 1945
- Operator: Baltimore City Department of Parks and Recreation

- Lake Roland Historic District
- U.S. National Register of Historic Places
- U.S. Historic district
- Location within Maryland Location within the United States
- Nearest city: Baltimore, Maryland
- Coordinates: 39°23′13″N 76°38′49″W
- Area: 281 acres (114 ha)
- Built: 1858
- Architect: Slade, James
- Architectural style: Greek Revival
- NRHP reference No.: 92001285
- Added to NRHP: October 15, 1992

Lake Roland is a city/county park encompassing over 500 acres of woodland, wetlands, serpentine barrens, rare plants and rocky plateaus surrounding Lake Roland in Baltimore County, Maryland. The park is located near the intersection of Falls Road and Lake Avenue, adjacent to the Falls Road Light Rail Stop of the Baltimore Light Rail, which runs from Cromwell Station near Glen Burnie in Anne Arundel County in the south to Hunt Valley of Baltimore County. The line runs along a railroad embankment and trestle over the lake above the dam, cutting the park into a two-thirds wooded northern part and the one-third southern portion around the dam, picnic groves, pavilion and pumping station.

Though the park is located just outside the northern limits of Baltimore City, it is owned by the city and operated as a park since the 1920s by the Baltimore City Department of Recreation and Parks and is now leased to neighboring Baltimore County and operated by their parks agency, in a similar arrangement to the situation with Fort Smallwood Park, several miles southeast of the city along the Patapsco River's south shore in Anne Arundel County, and transferred for lease to that suburban county's jurisdiction. After years of disrepair, the park was temporarily closed on December 16, 2009, when Baltimore County assumed operation of the Park for which Baltimore City's government still "retains title," for $6 million in extensive renovation, working with the Wallace Montgomery and Human & Rohde, Inc. construction companies, including "pavilions, playgrounds, trails, bridges and even a dog park." Under the new administration of Baltimore County's Parks and Recreation, the park was reopened to the public on Friday, October 14, 2011.

== History ==
The lake was constructed in the late 1850s after the city's 1854 purchase of the assets of the privately owned Baltimore Water Company, (founded 1805), following a long political controversy about the company's failure to extend water lines and service into the then outlying areas of town after the most recent annexation of 1818 which moved the city's northern boundary to then-called Boundary Avenue (today's North Avenue). The "Beaver Dam" marble old pumping station on the eastern shore of the lake contains a marble pedestal engraved with the dates and names of the pertinent officials and contractors involved in its construction and completion in 1860–61, along with another stone tablet that used to lie at the dam's western end before its reconstruction in the mid-1990s by the city.

Further to the south, the city had also just purchased the former Lloyd Nicholas Rogers estate "Druid Hill", first settled by Europeans in the mid-1660s and with manor plantation houses reconstructed several times since, most recently in 1800 with what later became called the "Mansion House". It formed the third largest municipal landscaped park in the country (after Central Park in New York City and Fairmount Park in Philadelphia). Druid Lake was carved out, constructed and landscaped to add capacity to the newly expanded first municipal water supply system using the waters of the inter-connecting Jones Falls which flowed south through the central city to the Northwest Branch of the Patapsco River and the Baltimore Harbor. The system of parks for the City of Baltimore along the various stream valleys with inter-connected landscaped boulevards or parkways was designed and laid out by the famous landscape architect and developer Frederick Law Olmsted and the company later established by his sons in two famous reports in 1904 and 1926, of which Lake Roland and its dam formed an integral part.

Lake Roland Historic District, declared in 1992, is a national historic district in Baltimore City and Baltimore County, Maryland, United States. It consists of a man-made lake, Lake Roland, portions of the Jones Falls and Roland Run streambeds, and portions of the rights-of-way of former Green Spring Valley Railroad and the Northern Central Railway. The central portion of the historic district is occupied by Lake Roland, with a stone dam capped by a stone valve house, built in 1858–1861. The lake was developed in the mid 19th century as a part of the city's municipal water system and built as the main reservoir. The lake is surrounded by open areas and woods.

=== Name ===
In 1945, the park was designated as the Robert E. Lee Memorial Park after General Robert E. Lee, who commanded the Confederate Army of Northern Virginia during the American Civil War. This was done at the request of wealthy Baltimorean Elizabeth B. Garrett White, the aunt of segregationist Robert Garrett, then chairman of the Baltimore City Recreation Commission, who required that when she died (1917), the proceeds from the sale of her estate was to be used to erect a monument for Lee, which was later used to name the park instead.

Until the name of the park, just outside city limits, changed to Lake Roland, some saw it as a "lovely spot" but also a "reminder of the city's stance on race," a "vestige of racism" or "heritage of hate," while some historians argued that the name of "Roland Park" has "its own history as one of the most exclusive and segregated white neighborhood's in Baltimore," opening the name up to possible criticism in the future.

In the aftermath of the Charleston church shooting and in response to the general controversy revolving the display of Confederate symbols, there was debate about changing the name of the park. In June 2015, the County Executive of Baltimore County, Kevin Kamenetz, asked officials of Baltimore City for a name change, saying that "we've been talking for months about a name change that better reflects this unique amenity. We believe Lake Roland Park is more reflective of this open space treasure, and we are confident that the City will approve our request, and I expect to make a joint announcement with the City about the name change in the very near future." On September 28, 2015, Baltimore County renamed the park to Lake Roland after being approved to do so by the Baltimore City Council.

The Park covers over 500 acres, has a multi-faceted nature center, which opened in October 2016, along with the Paw Point Dog Park, "numerous trails, nature and environmental programs...[two] pavilions, and waterfront activities," and many other recreational opportunities. The Park works with the Lake Roland Nature Council which partnered with Maryland artists to "showcase their work in the natural beauty of Lake Roland" as part of a continuing "Art on the Trail" project which began in 2015.

== Gallery ==
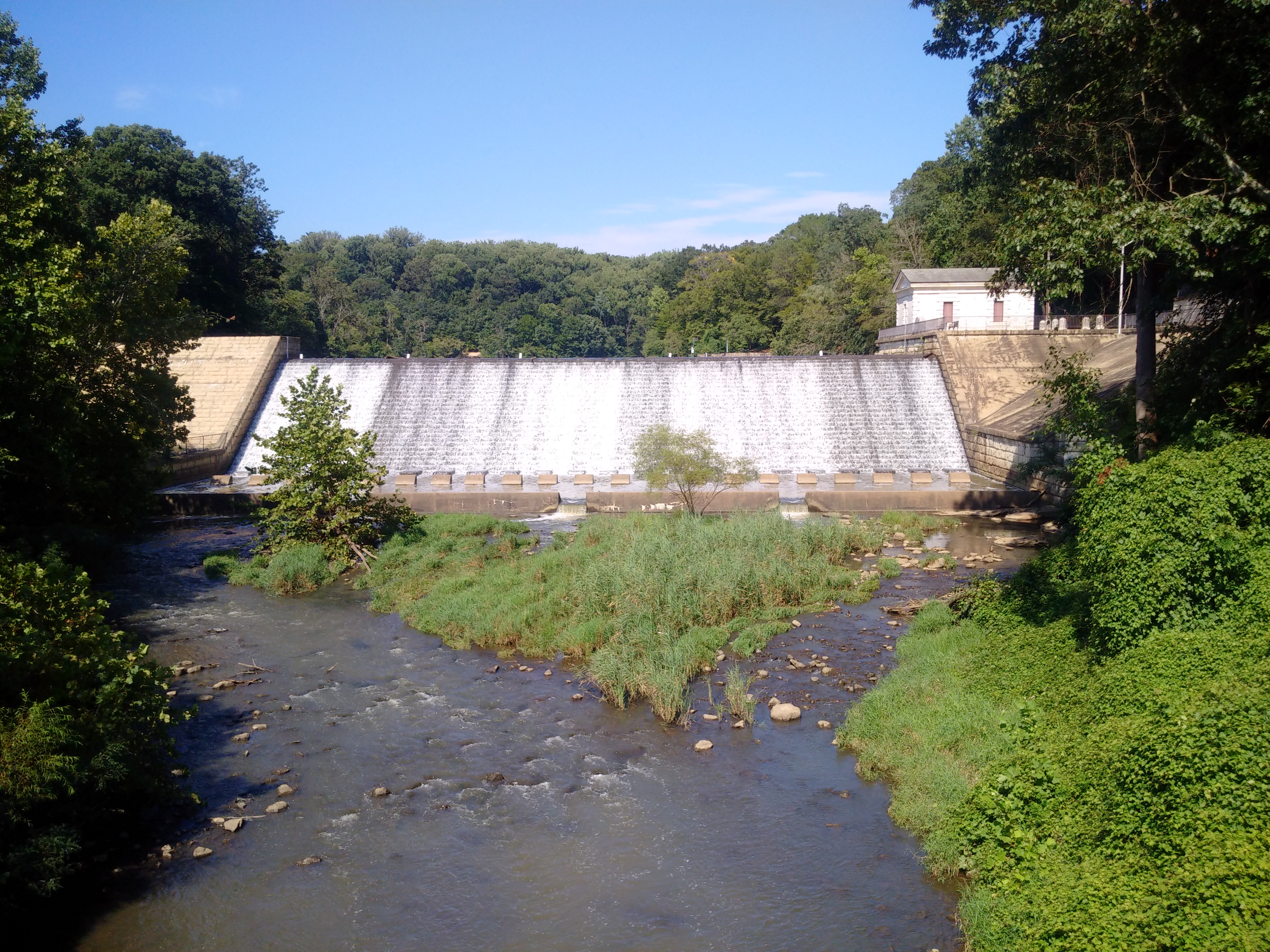
Lake Roland dam and Greek Revival-style marble pumping station (to the right/east) where the Lake Roland outflow becomes the Jones Falls

Hiking trail at Lake Roland Park

== See also ==
- Mount Washington Arboretum
