= The Orchards, Baltimore =

Coordinates: 39°22′2″N 76°37′42″W

The Orchards
- neighborhood statistical area
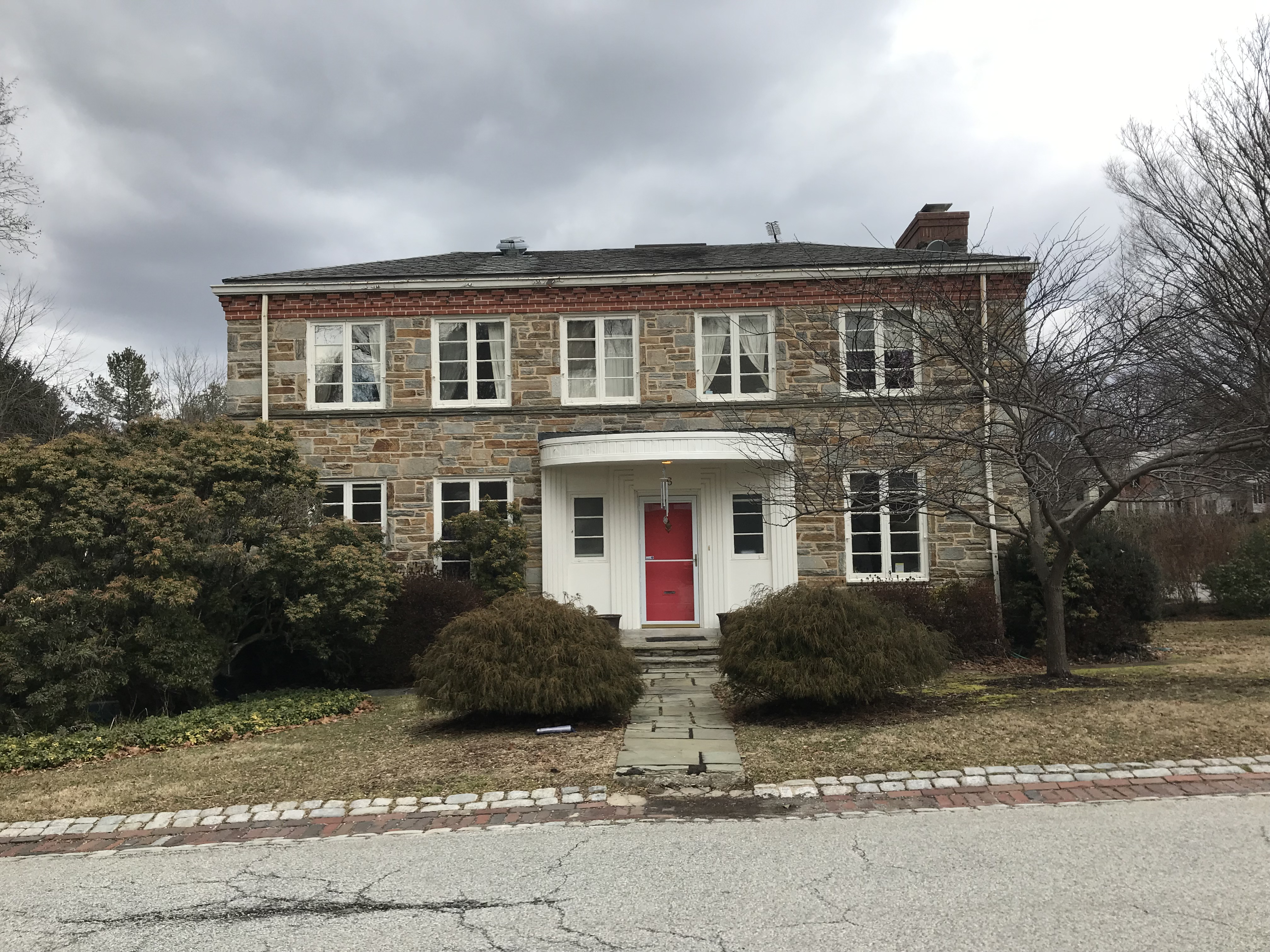
- House at the corner of W. Melrose Avenue and Greenleaf Road in The Orchards, Baltimore

- Location within Baltimore
- Country: United States
- State: Maryland
- City: Baltimore

Area
  - Total: 0.261 sq mi (0.68 km^{2})
  - Land: 0.261 sq mi (0.68 km^{2})

Population (2008)
  - Total: 453
  - Density: 1,740/sq mi (670/km^{2})
- Time zone: UTC-5 (Eastern)
  - Summer (DST): UTC-4 (EDT)
- ZIP code: 21210
- Area code: 410, 443, and 667

The Orchards is a neighborhood in the North District of Baltimore, located between the neighborhoods of New North Roland Park–Poplar Hill and Bellona–Gittings. Its boundaries are marked by the Baltimore County line (north), Maryland Route 133 Northern Parkway (south), and Maryland Route 139 Charles Street (east). Roland Avenue, West Lake Avenue, Kenmore Road and Melrose Avenue draw the neighborhood's west boundary.

The neighborhood gets its name from the early 20th century estate of Douglas H. Gordon.

== Landmarks ==
The Elkridge Hunt Club, a 117 acre 18 hole golf course, overlaps the city line at the northern edge of the Orchards, extending south to Lake Avenue along Charles Street. Established in 1878, it was originally a fox-hunting club.

== Public transportation ==
MTA LocalLink 30 provides bus service along Northern Parkway, along the southern edge of the Orchards. MTA LocalLink 95 runs along Roland Avenue, from Lake Avenue (north) into the downtown area (south).

== See also ==
Baltimore neighborhoods
