= L'Hirondelle Club =

Private social club in Ruxton, Maryland, US

L’Hirondelle Club
- Interactive map of L’Hirondelle Club
- 39°23′47″N 76°38′46″W

Club information
- Location: Ruxton, Maryland
- Established: 1872
- Type: Private
- Website: www.lhirondelle.com

L’Hirondelle Club is a private social club located in Ruxton, Maryland and is the oldest such club in the Baltimore region.

Established in 1872, L'Hirondelle remains true to its original mission of being "a club formed by friends for the purpose of creating a place in which they and their families can gather for social and athletic activities in a gracious and intimate atmosphere."

L’Hirondelle provides its membership with resort-style racquet and aquatics facilities as well as excellent dining and social event offerings.

== Facility ==
=== Dining ===
The club is noted for its American Fare as well as its seafood. It features two main dining rooms: the Grille Room for casual and family dining, and the Lounge Room for formal dining. Gentlemen are required to wear jackets in the Lounge, and sportswear is prohibited. Dining is also offered in the bar area, with a full menu and bar food available. The club hosts numerous fêtes for its members, including an annual Crab Feast, poolside grill nights, wine tastings, and Oyster Roasts.

The "swallow" logo, on a club matchbook.

=== Bar ===
The club features a large dine-in bar area which was constructed in 2007. One of the most popular drinks at the club has been the "Southside."

=== Other facilities ===
The Tavern Room, on the ground floor, features a bar and bowling. The Great Room, in the center of the main level, is the usual site of balls and buffets. The club also features locker room facilities in the clubhouse, as well as in the tennis house, a paddle hut for winter activities, and parking facilities. Use of cellular phones is prohibited within the clubhouse.

== Membership ==
=== Exclusivity ===
Membership is attainable only through nomination by a current member. Nominees must then be approved by a membership committee. An initiation fee and a monthly fee are required.

=== Guest policy ===
A private club, L’Hirondelle members are permitted to host guests. Moreover, members of select local clubs are also permitted to attend under certain conditions and circumstances. L’Hirondelle has such arrangements with sundry Baltimore area clubs, including the Baltimore Country Club, the Sparrows Point Country Club, the Greenspring Valley Hunt Club, and the Elkridge Club.
