= Bellona–Gittings Historic District =

Historic district in Maryland, United States

- U.S. National Register of Historic Places
- U.S. Historic district
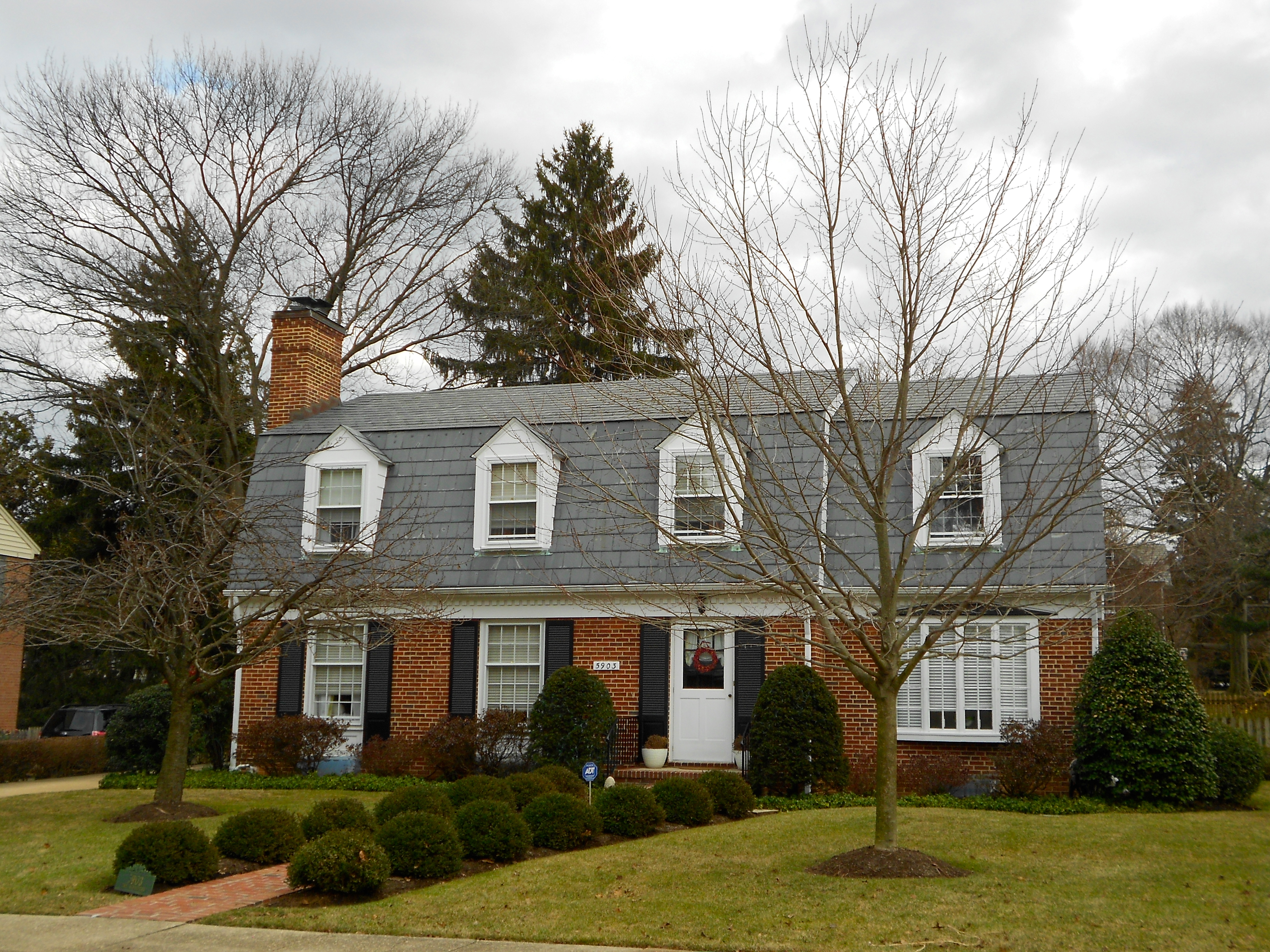
- House on Meadowood

- Location within Baltimore Location within Maryland Location within the United States
- Location: Bounded by E. Lake, Melrose and Gittings Aves., York Rd., Charles Rd., Charlesbrooke and Overbrook Rds., Baltimore, Maryland
- Coordinates: 39°22′47″N 76°36′53″W
- Area: 150 acres (61 ha)
- Built: 1853
- Architectural style: Colonial Revival, Tudor Revival, Late Gothic Revival
- NRHP reference No.: 08001217
- Added to NRHP: December 24, 2008

Bellona–Gittings Historic District is a national historic district located at Baltimore, Maryland.

The neighborhood is bounded by Bellona Avenue to the east, Melrose Avenue to the south, Charles Street to the west, and the City/County line to the north. The ne

It was listed on the National Register of Historic Places in 2008.

The resources of the district total 449, which includes 374 residences, associated garages, and one commercial property which is a one story brick store building used for a neighborhood pharmacy and wine store. The architecture of this building harmonizes with the surrounding buildings. Of these resources, 395 are contributing and are characterized by a high level of architectural integrity. Most of the 54 noncontributing resources were constructed later than the period of significance.

"Gittings" is named for the Gittings family, once one of the wealthiest families in the city, and one of the largest real estate holders.

== History ==
The neighborhood began to be developed in 1898 when the E. G. Miller family sold their estate, "Romaine," tot he Lake Avenue Land Company who purchased, and subdivided the land.

== See also ==
- Bellona–Gittings, Baltimore neighborhood
