= Homeland, Baltimore =

- Greater Homeland Historic District
- U.S. National Register of Historic Places
- U.S. Historic district
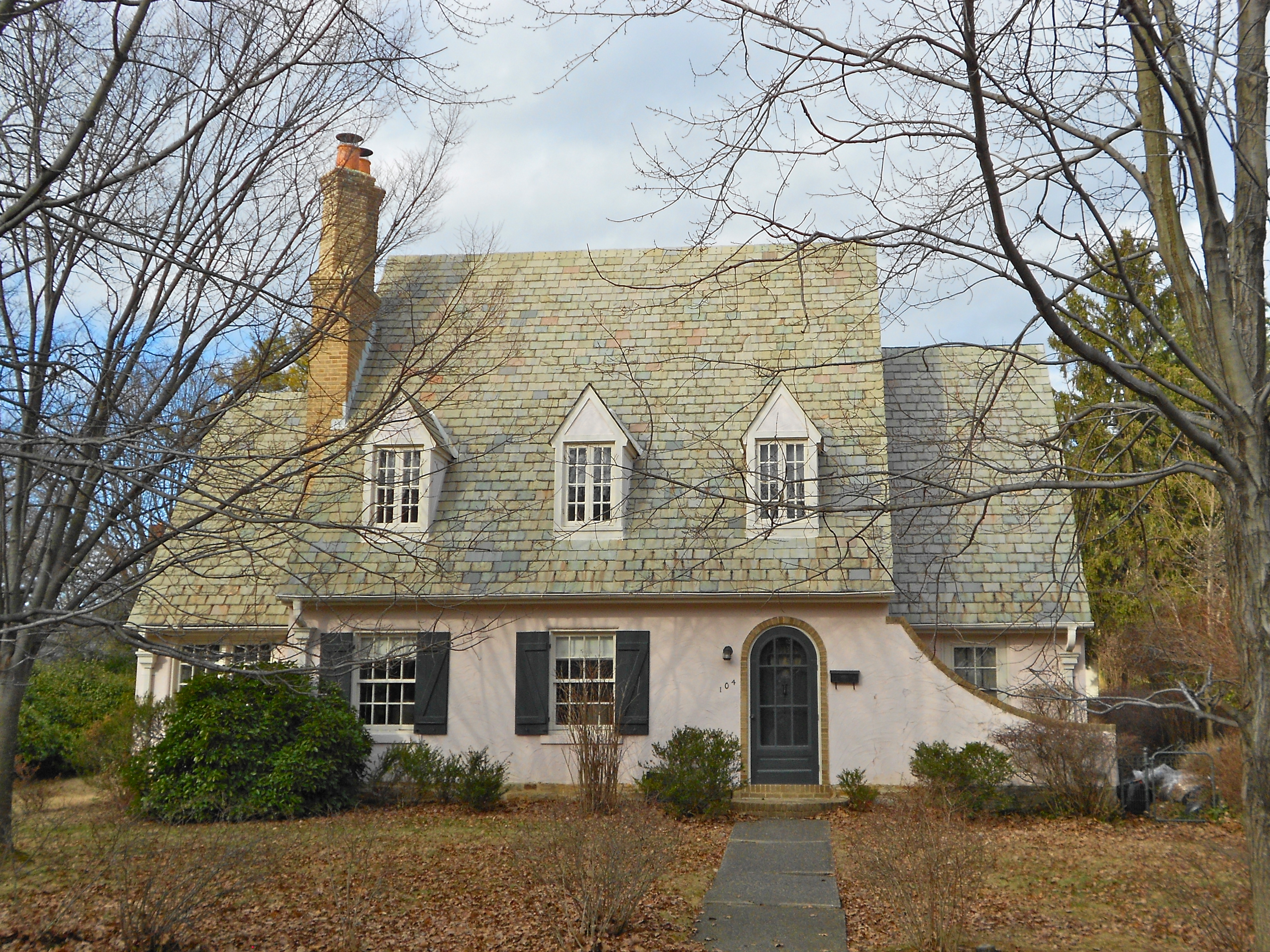
- House on Witherspoon Rd. in Homeland

- Location within Baltimore Location within Maryland Location within the United States
- Location: Roughly bounded by Charles St. Homeland Ave., York Rd., and Melrose Ave., Baltimore, Maryland
- Coordinates: 39°21′34″N 76°37′08″W
- Area: 400 acres (160 ha)
- Architect: multiple
- Architectural style: multiple
- NRHP reference No.: 01001377
- Added to NRHP: December 28, 2001

Homeland is a neighborhood in the northern part of Baltimore, Maryland, United States. It is bounded roughly by Melrose Avenue on the north, Bellona Avenue on the east, Homeland Avenue on the south, and Charles Street on the west.

The Greater Homeland Historic District was listed on the National Register of Historic Places in 2001 with 1,616 contributing buildings.

== Demographics ==
97.8% of the houses in Homeland are occupied and 88.5% of that number are owner occupied. According to the last census, 88% of the residents are white, 8.6% are black, 1.8% Asian and 1.5% are Hispanic. 20% of the white residents are reported as Irish, another 20% English, 17% German and 10% Polish. The median family income is $136,383 with 1.2% of those in the workforce unemployed. 90.7% are high school graduates and 41% report having a graduate or professional degree.

=== Notable residents ===
- Ann Marie Doory - member of the Maryland House of Delegates
- Denise Dory - news anchor for ABC2 News
- Michael Middleton - professional lacrosse player
- Tom Marechek - professional lacrosse player
- Martin O'Malley - Maryland governor
- Alec Ross (author) - Democratic candidate for Maryland Governor
- Julia Marciari-Alexander - director of the Walters Art Museum
- John Marciari - author and curator at the Morgan Library and Museum

== Government representation ==
Community	State District	Congressional District	City Council District
Homeland	43rd	2nd	4th
Representatives	Anderson; Doory; McIntosh	Charles Albert "Dutch"; Ruppersberger	Mark Conway

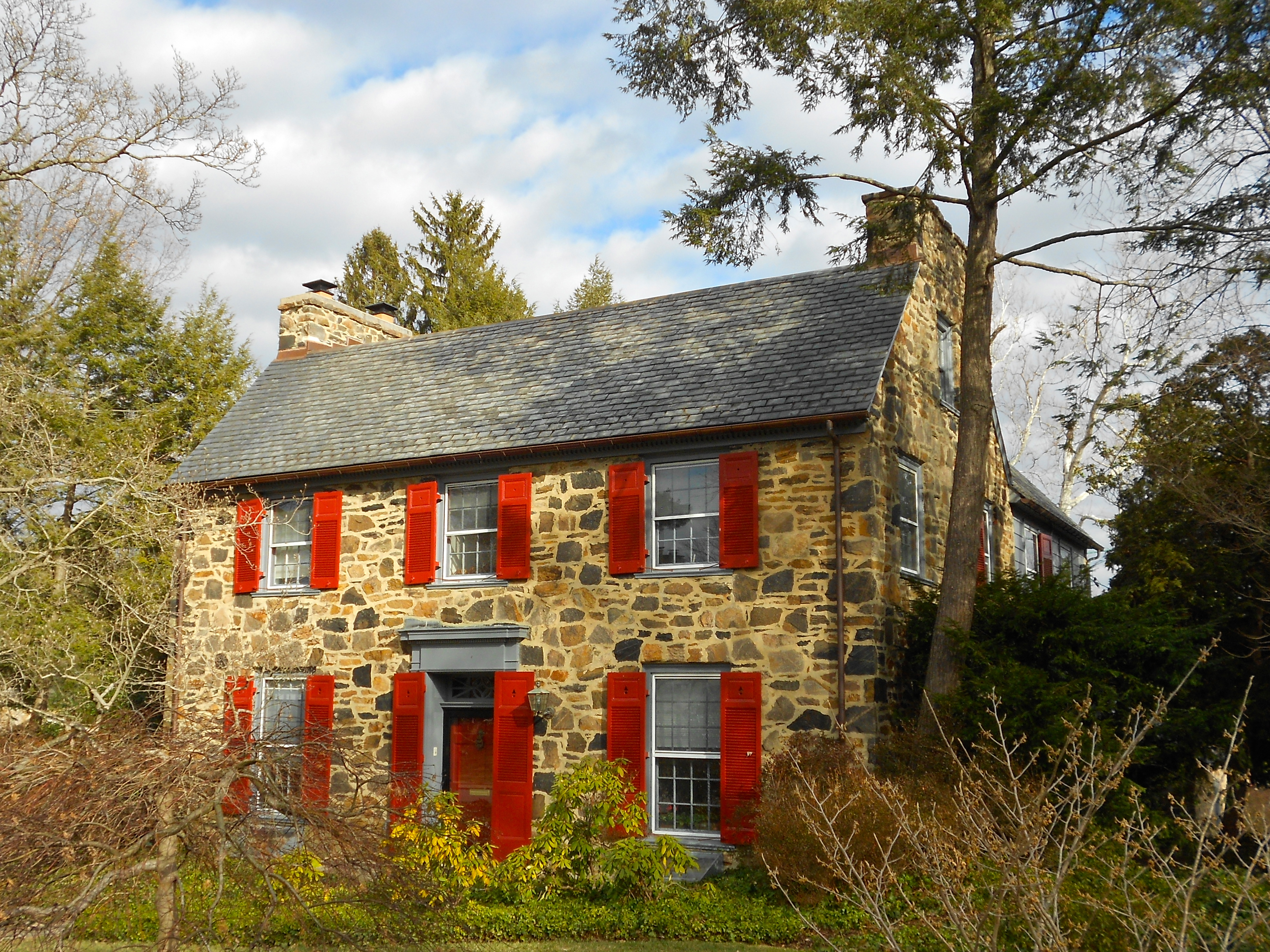
House on St. Albans Way

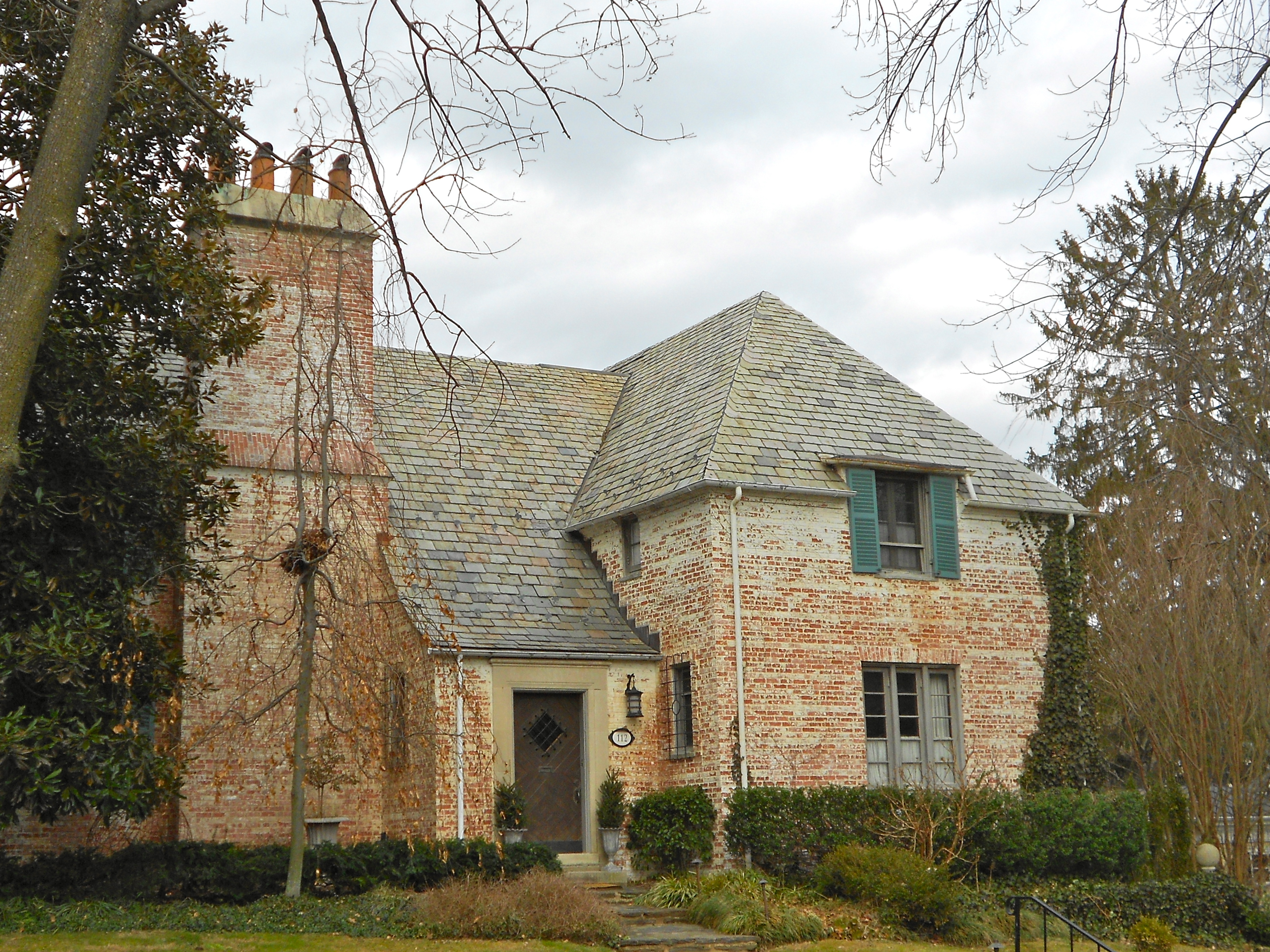
House on St. Dunstan's

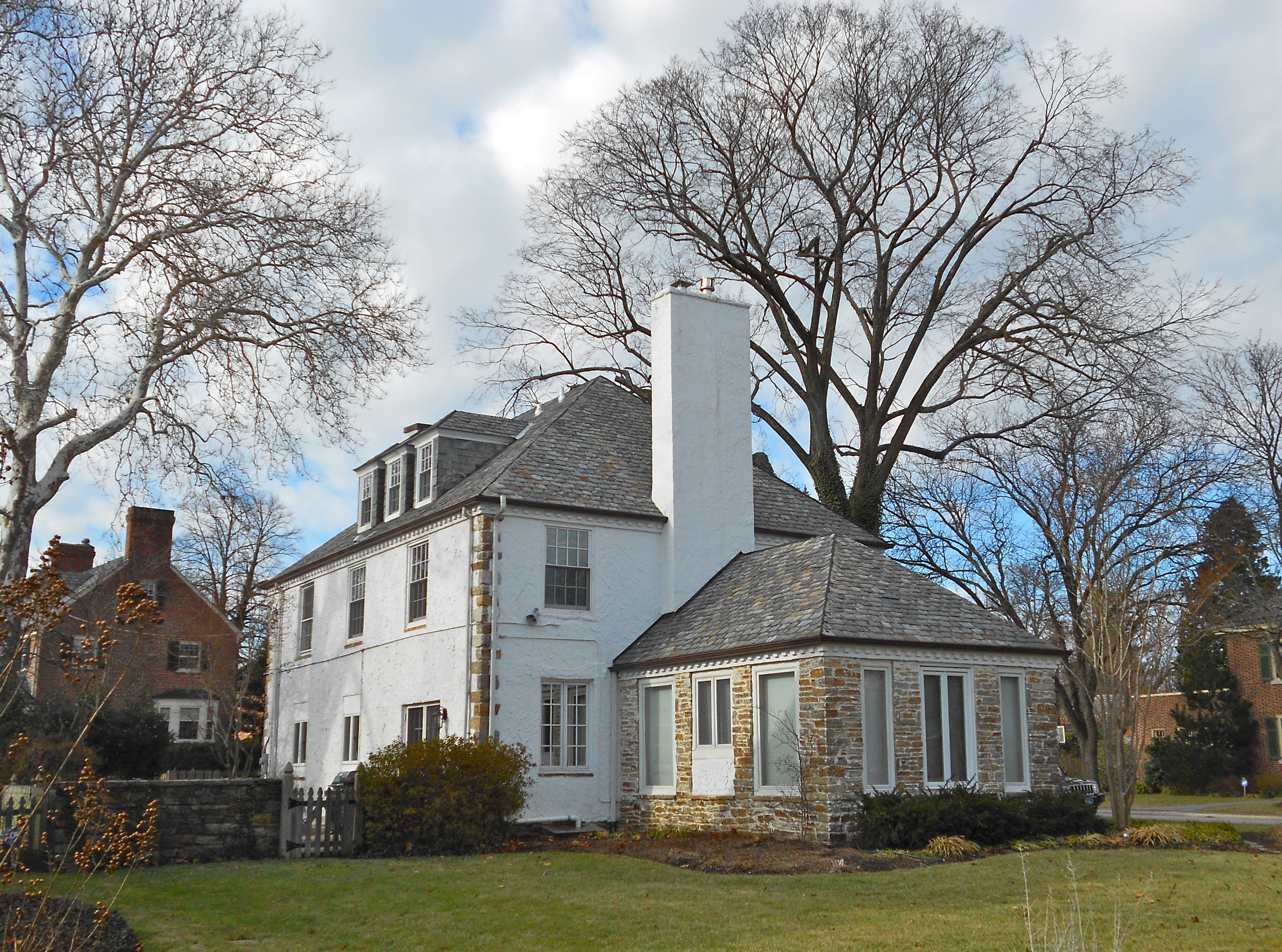
House on Witherspoon

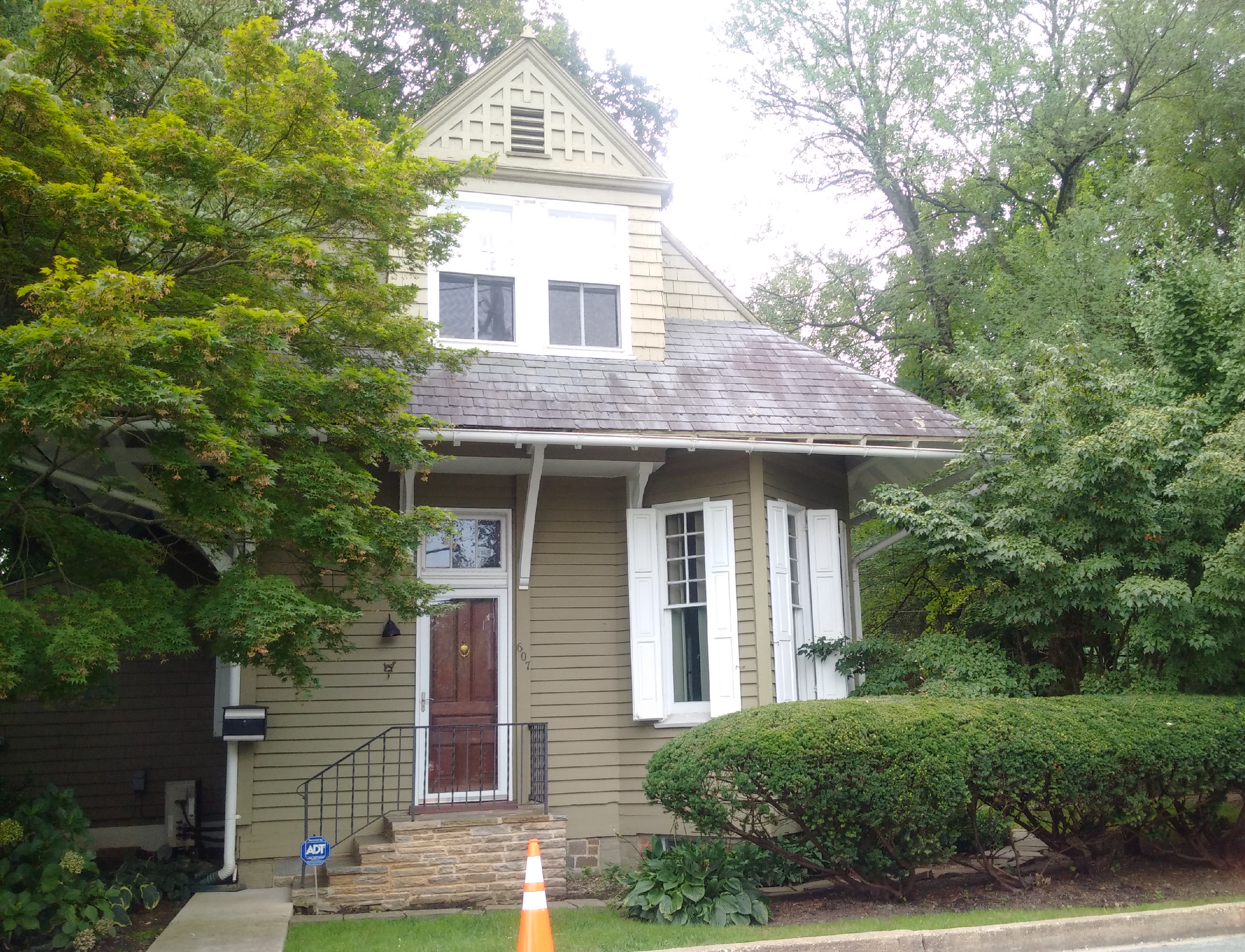
Ex-"Ma&Pa" RR station

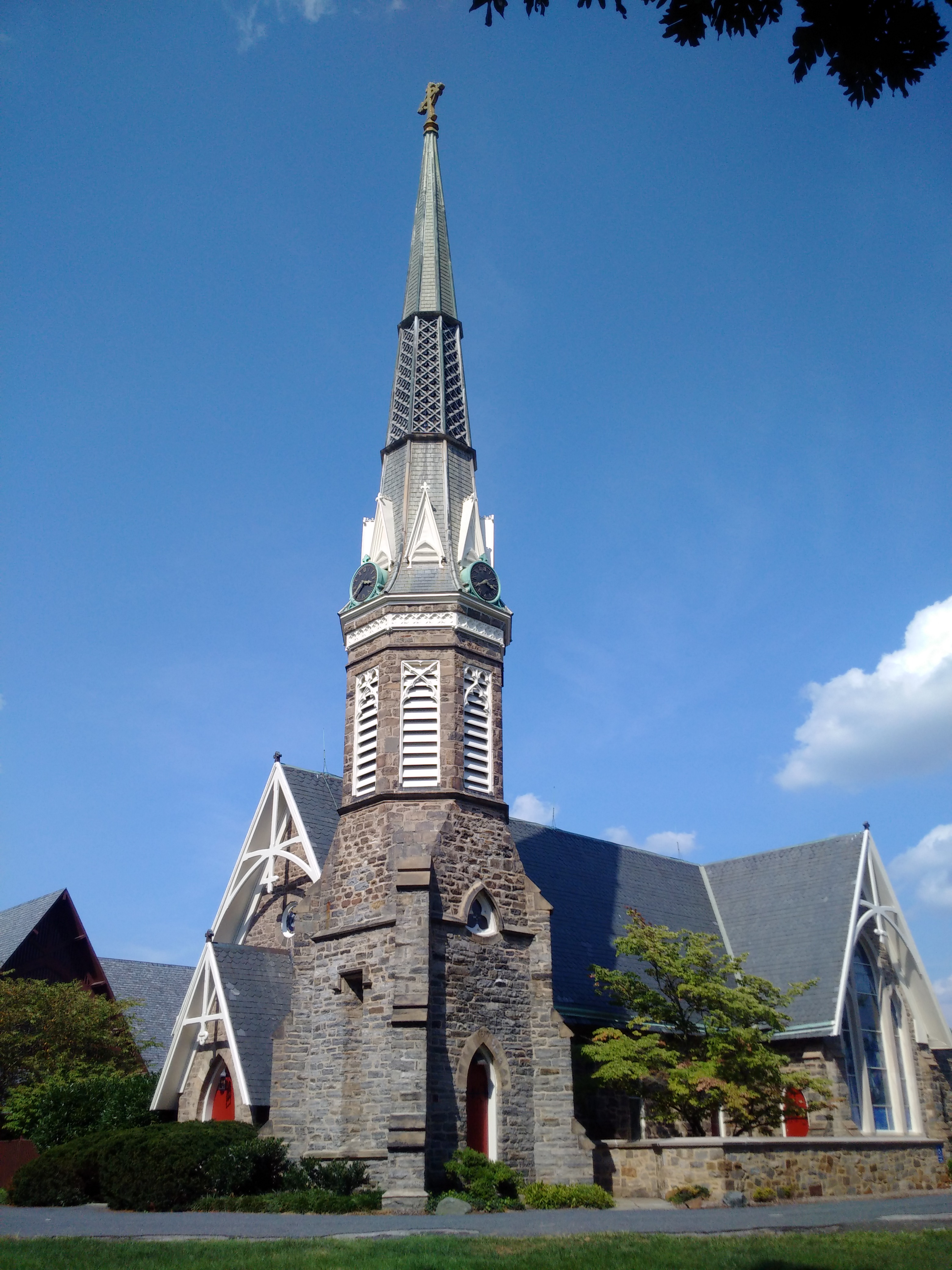
Church of the Redeemer (Episcopal)

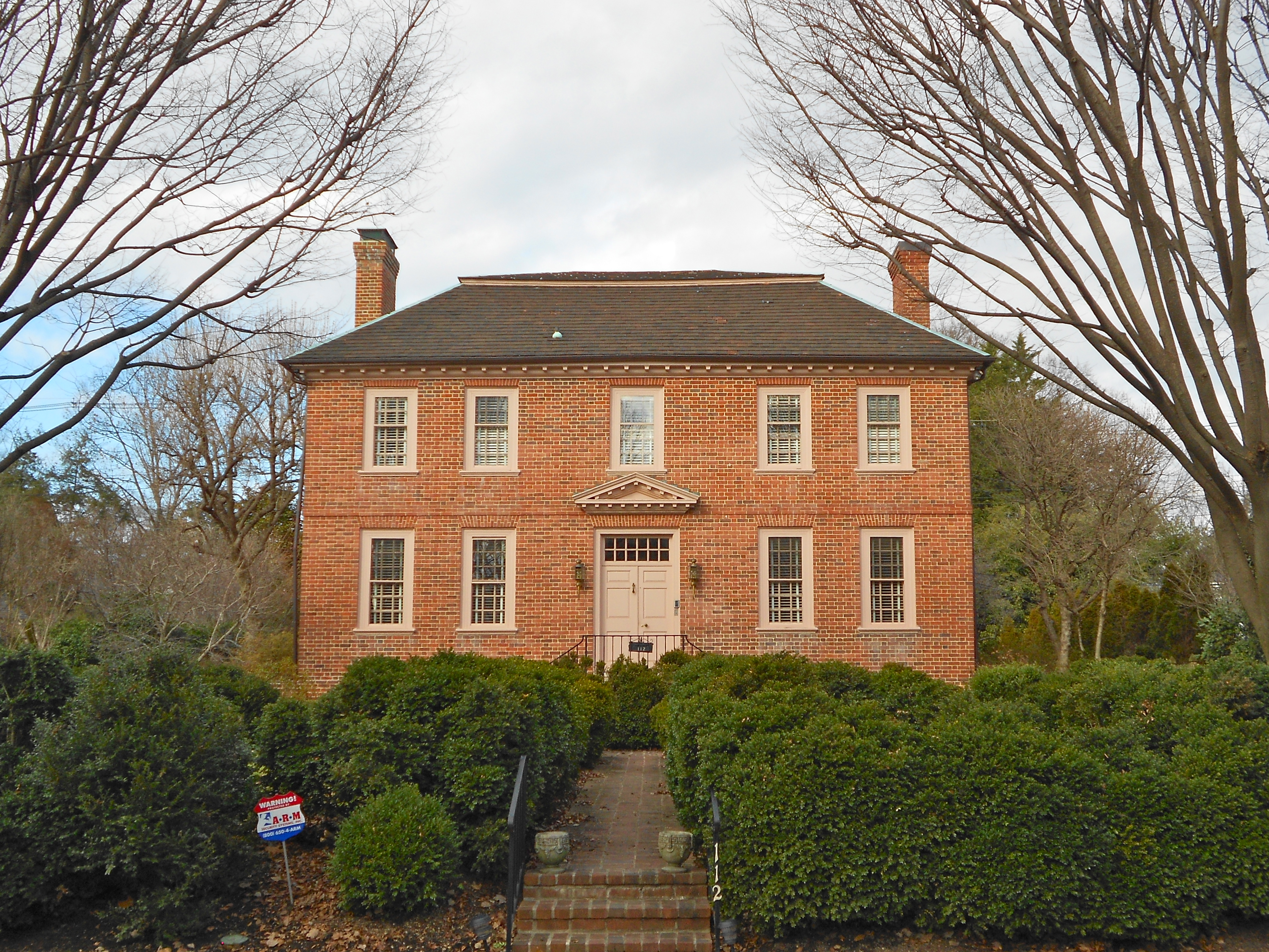
House on Witherspoon
