= John Eisold =

American physician (born 1946)

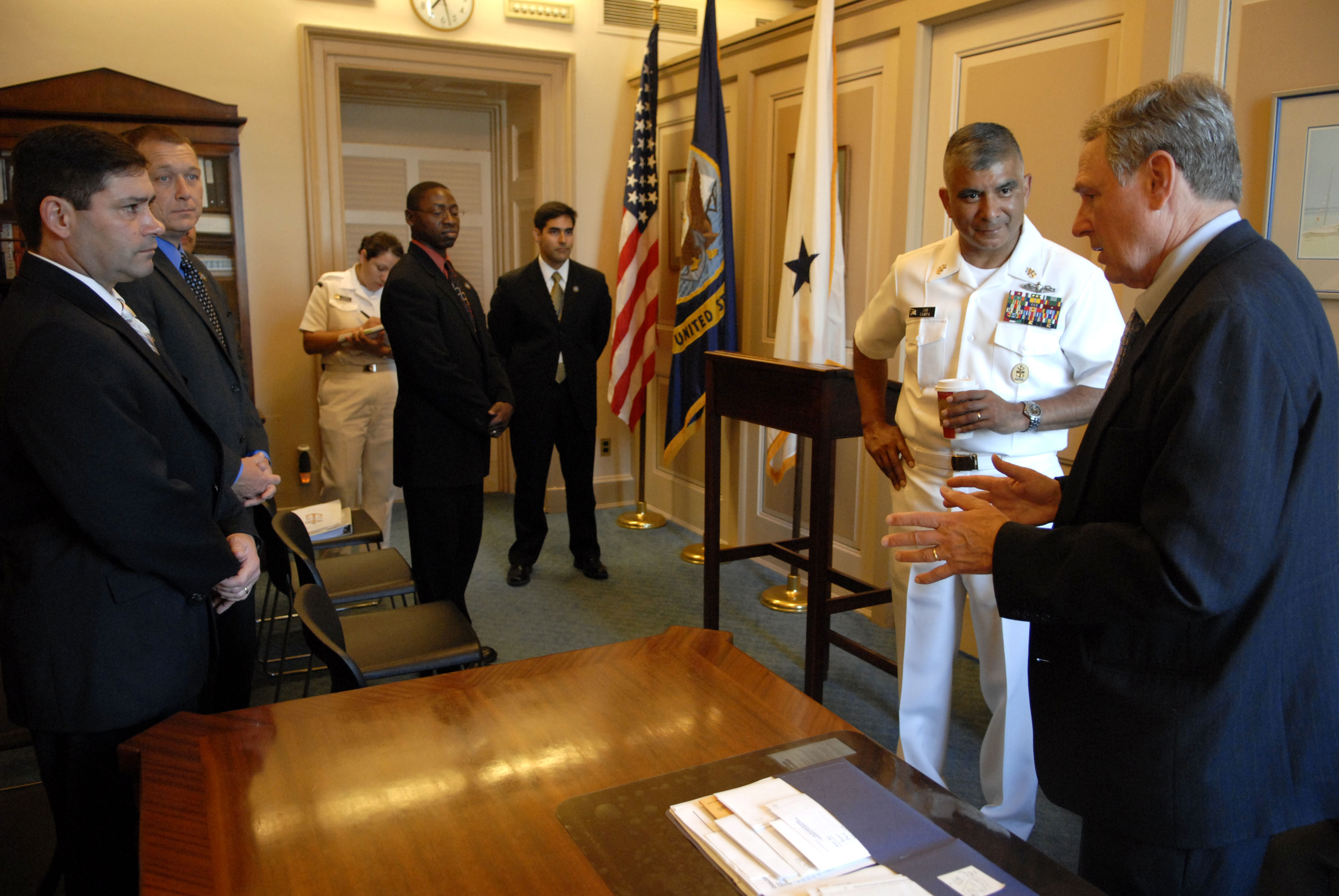
- Eisold with Joe R. Campa, June 2008

6th Attending Physician of the United States Congress
- In office 1994–2009
- Preceded by: Robert Krasner
- Succeeded by: Brian P. Monahan

Personal details
- Born: John Francis Eisold; October 21, 1946 (age 79) Cleveland, Ohio, U.S.
- Spouse: Janine Marie Vegiard (m. 1971; died 2013)
- Education: Dartmouth College (BS, MD)

Military service
- Branch/service: United States Navy
- Rank: Rear admiral

John Francis Eisold (born October 21, 1946) is an American retired physician and US Navy officer who was the Attending Physician of the United States Congress from 1994 to 2009. Eisold holds the rank of rear admiral in the United States Navy.

== Early life and education ==
Eisold was born in Cleveland and raised in Baltimore, graduating from Towson High School in 1964. He earned a bachelor's degree in physics from Dartmouth College in 1968 and was commissioned in the Navy.

Returning to school, he graduated from the Geisel School of Medicine at Dartmouth College in 1976 and did his postgraduate training at the National Naval Medical Center Program specializing in general internal medicine and geriatric medicine.

== Career ==
Prior to his appointment as Attending Physician of the United States Congress, Eisold was assigned to the National Naval Medical Center from 1988 to 1994. While there, he served as chairman of the Department of Internal Medicine.

Admiral Eisold and the Attending Physician's office played a central role in the 2001 anthrax attacks on Senator Tom Daschle's U.S. Senate office, taking nasal swabs from the nearly 6,000 staff, employees, and visitors that were potentially exposed to the harmful bacteria. Admiral Eisold and his staff also provided initial treatment to Senator Tim Johnson when he suffered from an intracerebral bleed caused by a cerebral arteriovenous malformation, prior to Johnson's admission to George Washington University Hospital.

Eisold was promoted to rear admiral in 1995. He has received the Distinguished Service Medal, two awards of the Legion of Merit and the Meritorious Service Medal.

== Personal ==
Eisold married Janine Marie Vegiard (January 24, 1947 – May 17, 2013) on June 5, 1971, in Groton, Connecticut. The couple had daughter and a son. After her death from cancer, his wife was interred at Arlington National Cemetery on June 18, 2013.
