= Amara Majeed =

American Muslim activist

Amara Majeed (born 16 July 1997) is a Muslim American activist and author of The Foreigners. In 2015, she was featured in 2015 BBC's 100 Women. She is founder of The Hijab Project, an organization that empowers Muslim women and encourages open dialogue through social experimentation.

Her letter to Donald Trump, published by Seventeen Magazine, led to media recognition.

Majeed graduated from Towson High School. She is currently studying Political Science and Lived Islam at Brown University and has a passion for Sufism. Majeed intends to pursue graduate school at University of Cambridge. Her family is from Sri Lanka.

A photo of Majeed was mistakenly used by Sri Lankan police in releasing details on six suspects in the 2019 Sri Lanka Easter bombings.

== Bibliography ==
- The Foreigners CreateSpace (22 July 2014) ISBN 978-0692260937
