= Rodgers Forge, Maryland =

Historic district in Maryland, United States

- Rodgers Forge Historic District
- U.S. National Register of Historic Places
- U.S. Historic district
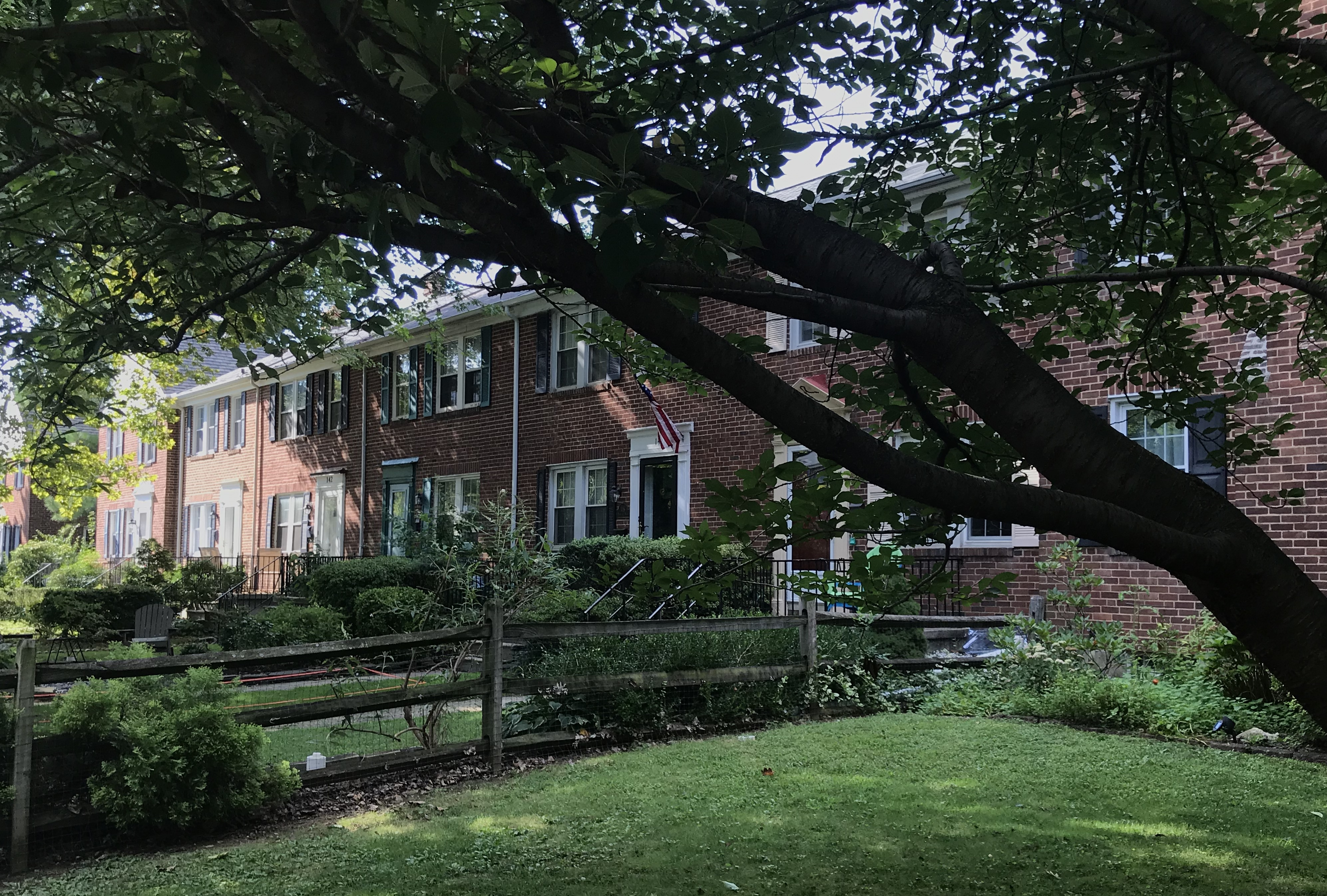
- Brick rowhouses in Rodgers Forge

- Location within Maryland Location within the United States
- Location: Roughly bounded by Stanmore Road, Stevenson Lane, York Road (Md. Route 45), Overbrook Road, and Bellona Avenue, north of Baltimore, Maryland
- Coordinates: 39°22′52″N 76°37′02″W
- Area: 150 acres (61 ha)
- Built: 1925
- Architect: Beall, Frederick; James Keelty & Sons
- Architectural style: Tudor Revival, Colonial Revival, Modern movement
- NRHP reference No.: 09000783
- Added to NRHP: September 24, 2009

Rodgers Forge is a national historic district southwest of the unincorporated Towson area and county seat of Baltimore County, Maryland, United States, just north of the Baltimore City/County line. It is mostly a residential area, with rowhouses, apartments, single-family dwellings, and a new complex of luxury townhomes. The area also has a small amount of commercial development. It is just south of Towson University. 21212 is the postal code for Rodgers Forge.

In 2004, Rodgers Forge gained international attention as the home of Olympic swimming champion Michael Phelps. In 2013, Rodgers Forge was ranked by Baltimore Magazine as one of the top neighborhoods in Baltimore County. The magazine also named Rodgers Forge as one of the 10 "best-kept secret neighborhoods" in Baltimore metropolitan area for its "strong public schools, thriving community organizations, and easy access to shopping and entertainment in Baltimore and Towson." Rodgers Forge has also been consistently ranked as one of the safest Baltimore neighborhoods, according to the website and online database NeighborhoodScout. In 2019, Rodgers Forge became the first neighborhood group in Maryland to file to remove racist language from historic deeds.

== History ==
Most of the Rodgers Forge community geographic area, as stated in the Rodgers Forge Community Association, Inc. by-laws, was part of Dumbarton Farm, which as late as 1837 was owned by Johns Hopkins. Hopkins died in 1837, while Johns Hopkins, known as a benefactor to Johns Hopkins University and Johns Hopkins Hospital, was 42 years of age at the time of the elder Hopkins' death. There are some unfounded claims that link the Hopkins benefactor to Dumbarton Farm, while other accounts do not specifically identify the Johns Hopkins.

Rodgers Forge takes its name from the blacksmith shop of George Rodgers, built in 1800, that was once on the southeast corner of York Road and Stevenson Lane.—the present day location of an automotive repair garage. The blacksmith shop acquired an additional function as a U.S. post office, and thus the surrounding area became known as Rodgers Forge. For example, in 1923, The Country Club of Maryland was founded as The Rodgers Forge Country Club. The names Rodgers Forge Golf Club and Rodgers Forge Golf Course were also used interchangeably.

In 1934, builder James Keelty (Sr.) began work on the Rodgers Forge neighborhood, and constructed over 600 red brick rowhouses until World War II stopped development. After the war, work resumed under the direction of Keelty's two son's James Keelty Jr. and Joseph Keelty. 1,777 homes were completed by 1956. In 1939, the price of a new interior row home was five thousand dollars, with end-of-group homes selling for considerably more. Many of these homes were sold with deeds including covenants that prohibited Black people from living there—with one exception: "No person of any race other than the white race shall use or occupy any building or lot except domestic servants."

The latter phase of construction saw the removal of a large hill just to the north of Dunkirk Road (through Murdock and Regester), flattening out to the north much of the original Dumbarton Farm down to subsoil, to accommodate the new row homes and apartments. The lack of topsoil - a frequent complaint of would-be gardeners in the neighborhood - is accounted for by the removal of the hill. During World War II, the neighborhood's "Victory Gardens" had occupied much of what now comprises Murdock Road, to the north of Dunkirk.

Despite the population density of Rodgers Forge, until the early 1960s, just to the west, a small working farm of a few acres with livestock remained at the junction of Stevenson Lane and Bellona Avenue. Just to the north in the same time period, the then operating Maryland and Pennsylvania Railroad, affectionately known as the "Ma & Pa" (handling commuters in its last years on the Maryland section), crossed under Bellona at Armagh Village.

The postwar expansion of Rodgers Forge owed its genesis, demographics, and character in large part to the residency of a young, upwardly mobile, middle-class mix of blue collar and technical professionals and their burgeoning baby boom families. When the malls finally did come in the mid-1960s with explosive development, as Towson State Teachers College morphed into Towson State College, and St. Joseph Hospital and Greater Baltimore Medical Center consumed vast remaining tracts to the north, all relicts of surrounding rural life and artifacts of the railroad had vanished from Rodgers Forge by 1970.

In 2009, the entire neighborhood of Rodgers Forge was listed in National Register of Historic Places due to "its unique status as a well-preserved example of early to mid-20th Century community design and architecture." According to the official citation:

The Rodgers Forge Historic District is architecturally significant as a prototypical example of a type of suburban rowhouse development which characterized the region during the late 1920s through the mid-1950s, and is especially noteworthy for the quality of its planning, architecture, and construction... Rodgers Forge stands as the most architecturally accomplished of all of the Early American-style rowhouse neighborhoods built in the greater Baltimore area during these years.

Today, about 4,000 people live in Rodgers Forge, which is now considered among the Baltimore area's "most sought after locations for families."

== Notable people ==
- Charles Adam Fecher, author and editor who is best known for his works about Jacques Maritain and H.L. Mencken; longtime Rodgers Forge resident
- F. Scott Fitzgerald and Zelda Fitzgerald, American novelist couple who resided in Rodgers Forge during 1932-1933
- William J. Frank, member of the Maryland House of Delegates
- Mary Claire Helldorfer (Elizabeth Chandler), author of New York Times Best Seller Kissed by an Angel
- Hilary Hahn, American violinist, three-time Grammy Award winner
- Ralph H. Hruban, professor of pathology and oncology at the Johns Hopkins University School of Medicine; a world-renowned expert in the field of pancreatic cancer pathology
- David H. Hubel, winner of 1981 Nobel Prize in Physiology or Medicine for discoveries on information processing in the visual system; resident of Rodgers Forge in 1950s
- Michael Phelps, American competition swimmer and the most decorated Olympian of all time
- Johnny Unitas, football player; owner of former Golden Arm restaurant in Rodgers Forge
- Henry N. Wagner, one of the pioneering researchers in nuclear medicine

== Schools ==
Baltimore County Public Schools

- Rodgers Forge Elementary School
- Dumbarton Middle School
- Students in Rodgers Forge are also zoned for nearby Towson High School.

Private Schools

- Dumbarton House, home of the Baltimore Actors Theatre Conservatory
- St. Pius X Catholic School (permanently closed in 2021)

== Major Roads ==
There are several state roads and other major thoroughfares that run through the Rodgers Forge area. These include:

- Charles Street
- Bellona Avenue
- Stevenson Lane
- York Road

== See also ==
- Stoneleigh-Rodgers Forge, Maryland, a former Census-designated place enumerated in 1960.
