= Stoneleigh-Rodgers Forge, Maryland =

Stoneleigh-Rodgers Forge
- Former CDP
- Location within the state of Maryland
- Coordinates: 39°22′40″N 76°37′49″W
- Country: United States
- State: Maryland
- County: Baltimore

Population (1960)
  - Total: 15,645
- Time zone: UTC−5 (Eastern (EST))
  - Summer (DST): UTC−4 (EDT)
- ZIP codes: 21212

Stoneleigh-Rodgers Forge was a Census-designated place in Baltimore County during the 1960 United States census, which consists of the communities of Stoneleigh and Rodgers Forge. The population in 1960 was 15,645. The census area merged with Towson in 1970, when the population of Towson CDP increased from 19,090 to 77,768. The ZIP code serving the area is 21212.

== Geography ==
The census area of Stoneleigh-Rodgers Forge was located north east of Baltimore and south of the census area of Towson. The land area of the CDP was 2.4 square miles and a population density of 6,519 per sq. mi.

== Education ==
The student population in the area is served by Baltimore County Public Schools. A few of the schools serving the area include Stoneleigh Elementary, Rodgers Forge Elementary, and Dumbarton Middle School.
