= Stoneleigh Historic District =

Historic district in Maryland, United States

- U.S. National Register of Historic Places
- U.S. Historic district
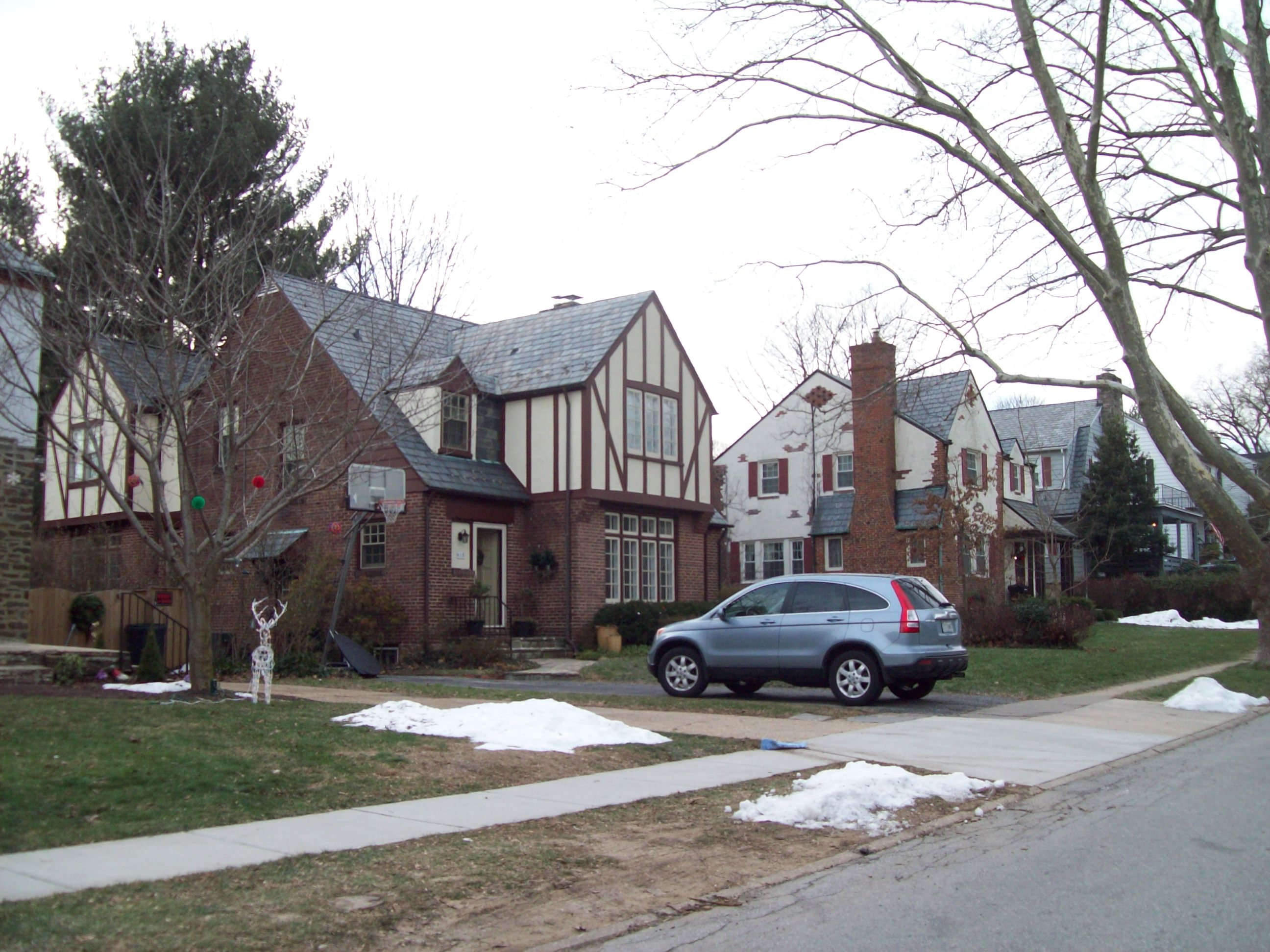
- Streetscape in Stoneleigh Historic District, December 2009

- Location within Maryland Location within the United States
- Nearest city: Towson, Maryland
- Coordinates: 39°22′46″N 76°36′16″W
- Area: 0 acres (0 ha)
- Built: 1922
- Architectural style: Classical Revival, Colonial Revival
- NRHP reference No.: 03001113
- Added to NRHP: November 08, 2003

Stoneleigh Historic District is a national historic district at Towson, Baltimore County, Maryland, United States. It is a cohesive residential neighborhood in Central Baltimore County. The first 110-acre (0.45 km^{2}) section of Stoneleigh was platted in 1922 and later enlarged in 1954 with the central 20 acres (81,000 m^{2}) of land, on which the Italianate-style Stoneleigh Villa once stood. Domestic buildings in Stoneleigh extends from the 1920s to infill housing of the mid-1980s and are suburban examples of the Tudor Revival, Colonial Revival, French Revival, Spanish Mission Revival, Renaissance Revival, and Craftsman styles.

It was added to the National Register of Historic Places in 2003.

== See also ==
- Stoneleigh-Rodgers Forge, Maryland, a former Census-designated place enumerated in 1960.
