= Towson Calvary Baptist Church =

Church in Maryland, United States

Coordinates: 39°24′4.3″N 76°36′24.65″W

Towson Calvary Baptist Church, at 120 West Pennsylvania Ave, Towson, Maryland, was completed in 1929.

It is a gothic building built from the stone, concrete and aggregate supplied by the nearby Campbell quarry, which had its headquarters on the same block. The Harry Tyler Campbell company ultimately became the successful producers of Camel-Wite, an early whiting ingredient for paint, paper, rubber and plastic and Sakrete, a popular pre-mixed concrete formulation.

The structure is the second church building on the grounds. The first Calvary Baptist Church began meeting in 1890 and established their original wood-frame building at this address two years later (1892). The original building burned in 1929. The original 19th-century Baptist parsonage survived the fire and is currently leased for offices.
