= Historic East Towson =

Historic neighborhood in Baltimore, Maryland

Coordinates: 39°23′59″N 76°35′50″W

Historic East Towson is the oldest African-American community in Baltimore County, Maryland. Its origins date back to 1829, when the death of Charles Carnan Ridgely, Maryland's 15th governor, triggered the manumission of over 350 enslaved people by the terms of his will. Some of those formerly enslaved moved to East Towson, and by the 1850s, the freed people from the Hampton Estate had built a community by establishing housing, a school, small businesses, and community centers.

Now referred to as Historic East Towson, this community is still home to descendants of people formerly enslaved at the Hampton Estate. Over time, the neighborhood has shrunk in size due to urban development. The Historic East Towson community, local colleges, grassroots organizations, and the descendants of those formerly enslaved are working to ensure the community and its history are known and respected by sharing stories about their past.

== History ==
=== Indigenous people ===
Historic East Towson was originally inhabited by the three Native American tribes: the Piscataway Conoy, Piscataway, and Accohannock. They each resided throughout parts of Towson and stretched alongside the East Coast in other areas. These tribes were preceded by the Susquehannock, a tribe of territorial indigenous people who controlled the eastern and western shores of the Chesapeake. Smallpox, war, and colonial factors decimated the Susquehannock population.

=== Historically Black Towson ===
The Hampton Estate held around 377 enslaved people at the time of Charles Carnan Ridgely’s death in 1829. Following his death, Ridgley’s son, John Ridgely, proceeded with the process of manumission for a select number of slaves based on the terms of his will. This included enslaved people from the ages of 25 to 45 for women; 28 to 45 for men; and infants under the age of two were emancipated with their parents. Ownership over the slaves who did not meet this criterion were disbursed to Ridgely’s heirs. Only 90 certificates of freedom have been uncovered under Carnan’s 1829 will. Many of these people were freed in 1829, with some receiving their freedom as late as 1843.

In the 1830s, manumitted people from the Hampton Mansion went on to found prominent communities in Baltimore including East Towson, Sandy Bottom, Schwartz Avenue and part of Lutherville. Though slavery would not be abolished in Maryland until November 1, 1864, free African Americans were able to purchase land before that time. Daniel Harris is credited as the first African American landowner in East Towson. On September 14, 1853, he purchased an acre of land near Hillen Road in East Towson for $187.50 from Benjamin Payne. More freed people migrated to East Towson to purchase land and build homes after their emancipation. East Towson consisted of a largely Black population until around the end of World War II due to suburban development.

Three historically Black churches remain active in Historic East Towson today: St. James African Union Methodist Protestant Church, Mount Olive Baptist Church, and Mount Calvary African Methodist Episcopal Church. These historic sites are among many in the area that the residents aim to sustain.

Some of the descendants of those freed from the Hampton Estate still reside in Towson, Maryland. These descendants are being recognized through ethnographic studies such as Tracing Lives, completed in 2020 by Cheryl LaRoche and a team of scholars in collaboration with the National Park Service.

== Urban development ==
Once a community that stretched from York Road and Bosley Avenue to North and West Towson, Historic East Towson now consists of six blocks due to urban development projects. In 1968, Baltimore Gas and Electric bought property in East Towson and built a power substation that caused the demolition of eight historic homes and the Negro League baseball field in East Towson. In 1972, houses on Chesapeake Avenue–also known as the Great Black Way–were demolished to build the parking garage for the Baltimore County Library. In 1994, the neighborhood’s bordering land was used to build the District Courthouse, causing the removal of four more historic homes. Later in 1994, the construction of Harris Hill affordable-condominiums razed five more historic homes in Historic East Towson.

In 2012, Evergreene Homes approached the Delaware-based owner of the Historic Parker House log cabin in Historic East Towson. The company offered to buy the land, which would be used to host a townhouse development plan. The owner accepted and relocated this log house to Fairmount Avenue at the eastern edge of Historic East Towson. Evergreene obtained permits for a 35-unit luxury townhouse complex which will be located one block away from St. James African Union Methodist Protestant Church.

In 2019, the Red Maple Place Project was proposed to provide affordable housing for residents in Baltimore County. The Red Maple Place Project is a planned 56-unit apartment building slated to be built on half of a 2.8 acre plot originally addressed 413 East Pennsylvania Ave in the Historic East Towson community.

As a result of these developments and a subsequent reduction in housing, residents are relocating. The decision to sell and/or flip homes of Historic East Towson was made by some of the descendants of original residents.

== Notable residents ==
- Daniel Harris was the first African-American landowner in East Towson. On September 14, 1853, he purchased an acre of land near Hillen Road for $187.50 from Benjamin Payne.
- Samuel S. Williams was an East Towson architect who built many of the homes in the community. He was also a business owner who made and sold concrete blocks to other African-American builders seeking to create homes in East Towson. Williams was an associate pastor at St. James AUMP Church for many years after being ordained in 1936. He was buried at Pleasant Rest Cemetery after his death in 1962.
- Albert Cassell was an African-American architect in the mid-20th century. He specialized in academic buildings, designing for universities such as Howard University and Morgan State University.
- Billy Jones was the first African-American basketball player in the Atlantic Coast Conference.
- Adelaide Bentley, the president of NeTIA for nearly 30 years, advocated for the preservation of Historic East Towson. She discussed the tensions between the African-American community of East Towson and the White community of West Towson. She photographed daily life in East Towson, capturing an image of the first African-American police officer from the Towson Area, Walter Myers. A park in Historic East Towson is named in her honor.

== Historic landmarks ==
=== St. James African Union Methodist Protestant Church ===
St. James AUMP Church is the oldest church in the Historic East Towson area. Its origins date back to 1861 when a group of African-Americans from the East Towson community met in the homes of the late James Garrett and the late Frank and Ida Scovens. On October 17, 1881, members of the church purchased land on Jefferson Avenue, where the church was built.

The large bell in front of the church is older than the church itself, dating back to 1845. It was originally used in another structure to announce the departure of the streetcar on York Road, until St. James acquired it. The bell was fixed onto the roof and notified the start of 10 AM Sunday service. The weight of the bell caused the church roof to sag. It was taken down and placed in front of the church.

A second level was built in 1906, with each floor containing a sanctuary. The main sanctuary was moved to the second level, while the first level was used primarily for group meetings and banquets.

=== Maryland and Pennsylvania Railroad ===
The Maryland and Pennsylvania Railroad (Ma & Pa) was formed in 1901 from the merger of several railroads that date to the 1880s and 1890s: the Baltimore & Delta Railway (later the Baltimore and Lehigh Railroad) and the York and Peach Bottom Railway (later the York Southern Railroad). The Ma & Pa ran through Historic East Towson, parallel to East Pennsylvania Avenue and directly alongside the Carver Colored High School. It remained in service until August 31, 1954. Two stone bridge abutments were left in place from where the line crossed York Road. The Towson Bypass now runs along a portion of the former rail alignment in the area.

=== Carver High School ===
The building at 300 Lennox Avenue at the intersection of Jefferson Avenue in East Towson was the original Carver Colored High School opening in 1939. Its first class consisted of 44 African-American students: 22 local and 22 non-local. In September 1949, the school moved to York Road. The 1954 Supreme Court ruling in Brown vs. Board of Education caused the school population to dwindle, and the school closed in 1959. Carver High School became the desegregated Towsontowne Junior High School at 938 York Road, and was renamed to Central Vocational Technical High School.

In 1992 the York Road school was renamed the George Washington Carver Center for Arts and Technology, a nod to its origins. The building at 300 Lennox Avenue today operates as the East Towson Carver Community Center and houses the offices of the Northeast Towson Improvement Association, a daycare, and a satellite office for Baltimore County Recreation and Parks.

=== Pride of Towson Elks Lodge ===
The Pride of Towson Lodge (also known as the Elks Home) serves as the social hub of the Historic East Towson community, a backdrop for various celebration events, jazz concerts, crabfeasts, bull roasts, alumni and homecoming events, scholarship presentations, and memorial repasts. Throughout its existence, the Lodge and its members have demonstrated a commitment to the Towson community, with a particular focus on veterans and youth. In its earlier days, the Lodge was a site for Black entertainment: local jazz bands and musicians would play there. The members of the Jimmy Smith band included Freddy Barnes, Jimmy Smith, William V. Norris, and Donald Colbert; the latter two were from East Towson. In recent years, the Lodge has become the home of the Historic East Towson Juneteenth Music Festival.

=== Historic East Towson homes ===
Many of the homes in Historic East Towson were built and designed by formerly enslaved people skilled in metalworking and architecture. The neighborhood consisted of critter and shotgun-style homes. Critter houses had thatched roofs on outbuildings. Shotgun homes had one-story layouts with three or more rooms. A home with this style can be found at 435 Pennsylvania Avenue, which was constructed between 1915 and 1917. Other noteworthy homes are 417 Jefferson Avenue, which was built by William Walker prior to 1898, and 317 Lenox Avenue, which was erected by Samuel S. Williams in 1906.

The Historic Parker House, at 423 Jefferson Avenue, is one of the oldest structures in the region, having been constructed in the third quarter of the 1800s.
