= Towson, Maryland =

- Census-designated place
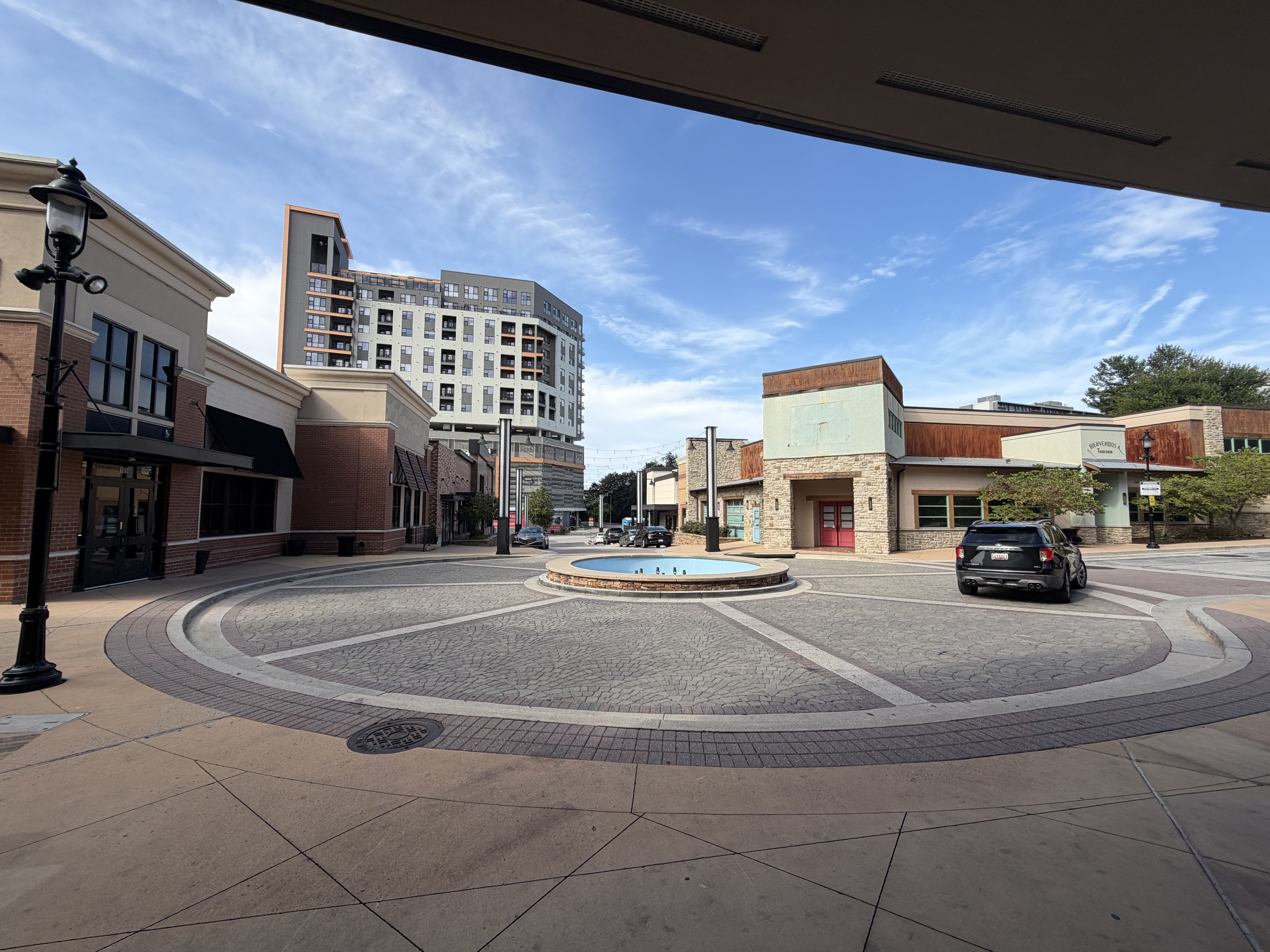
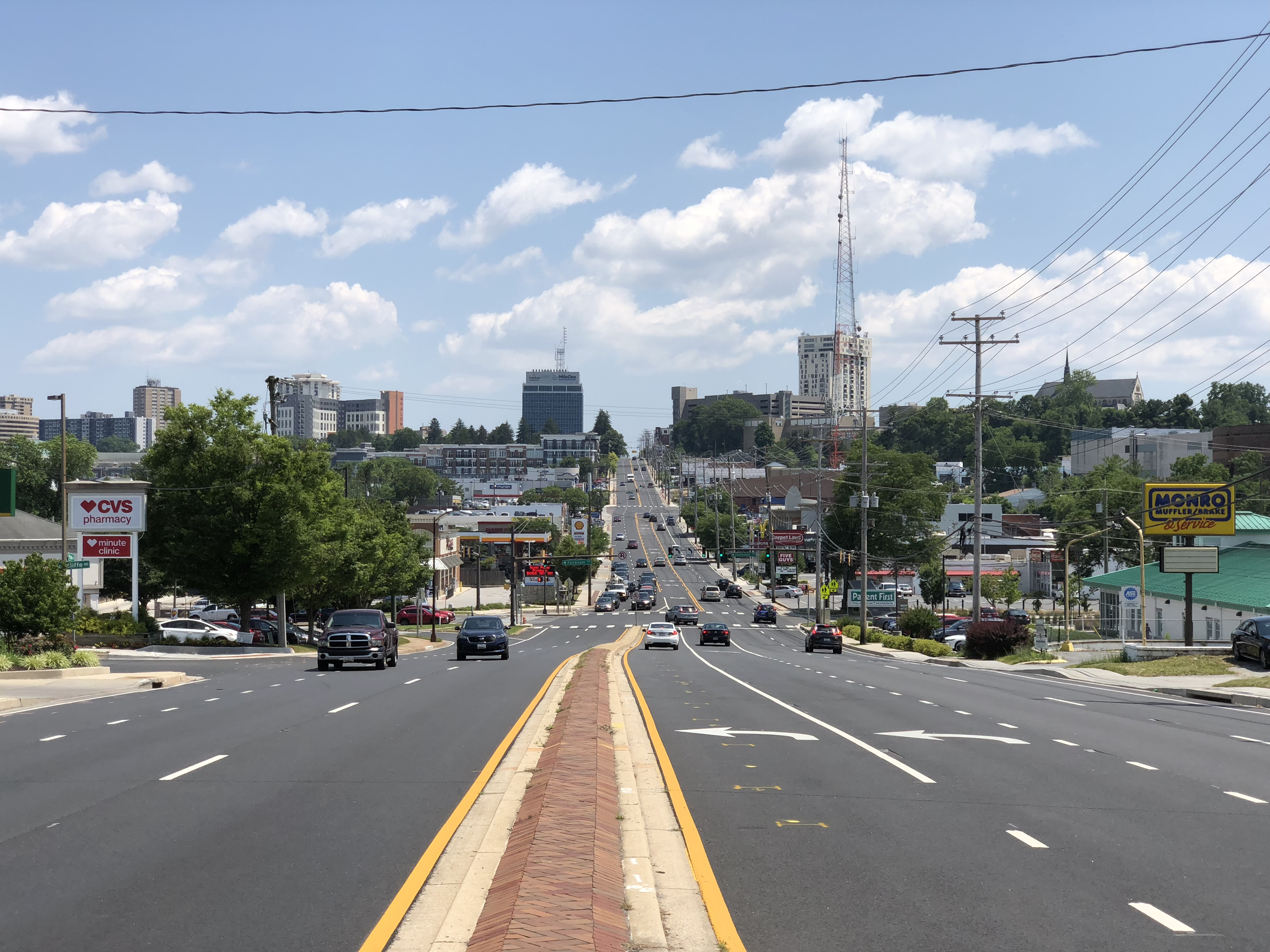
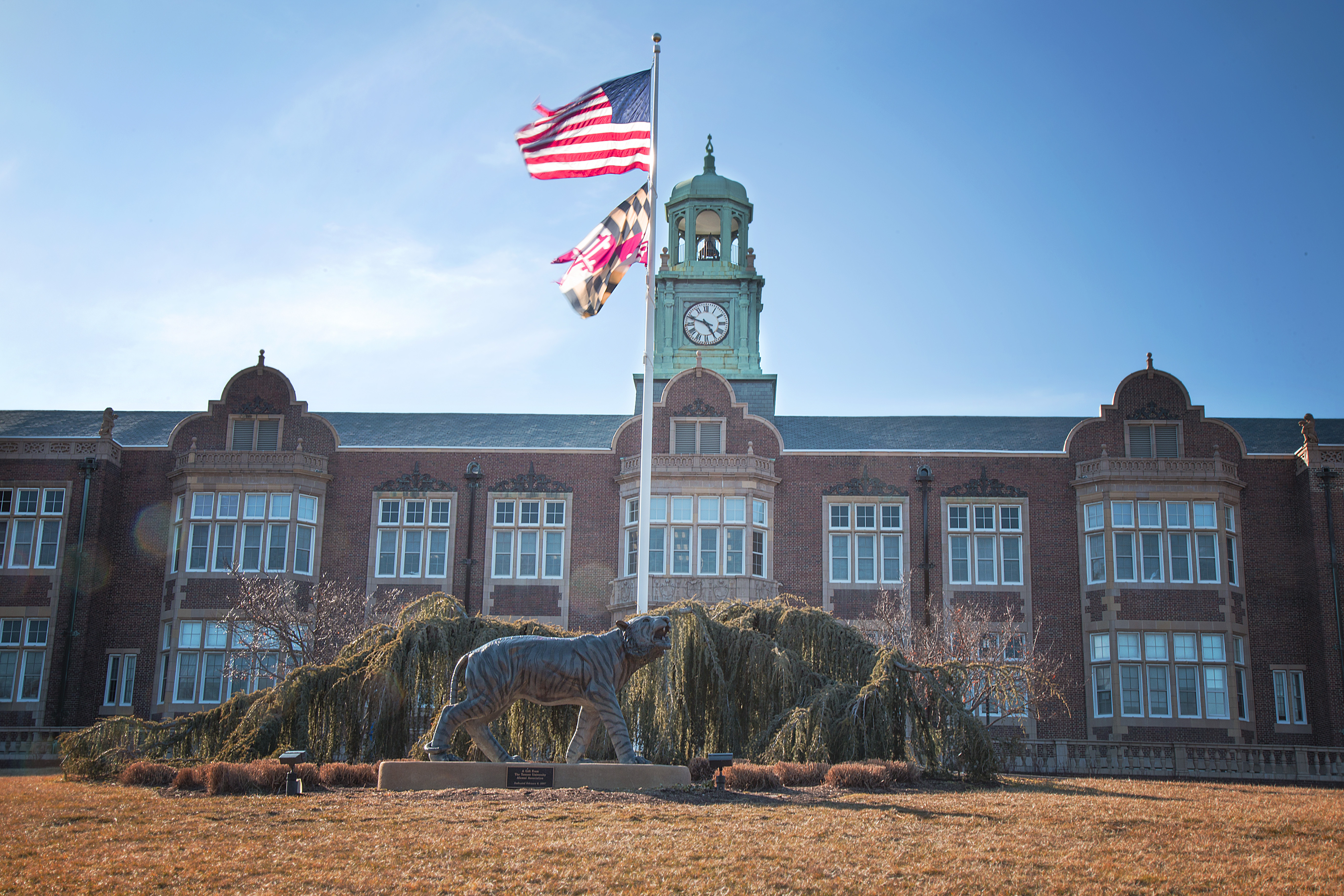
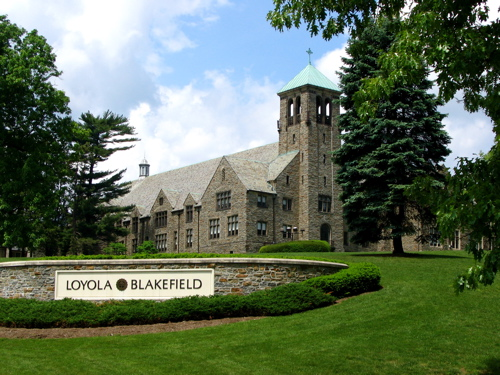
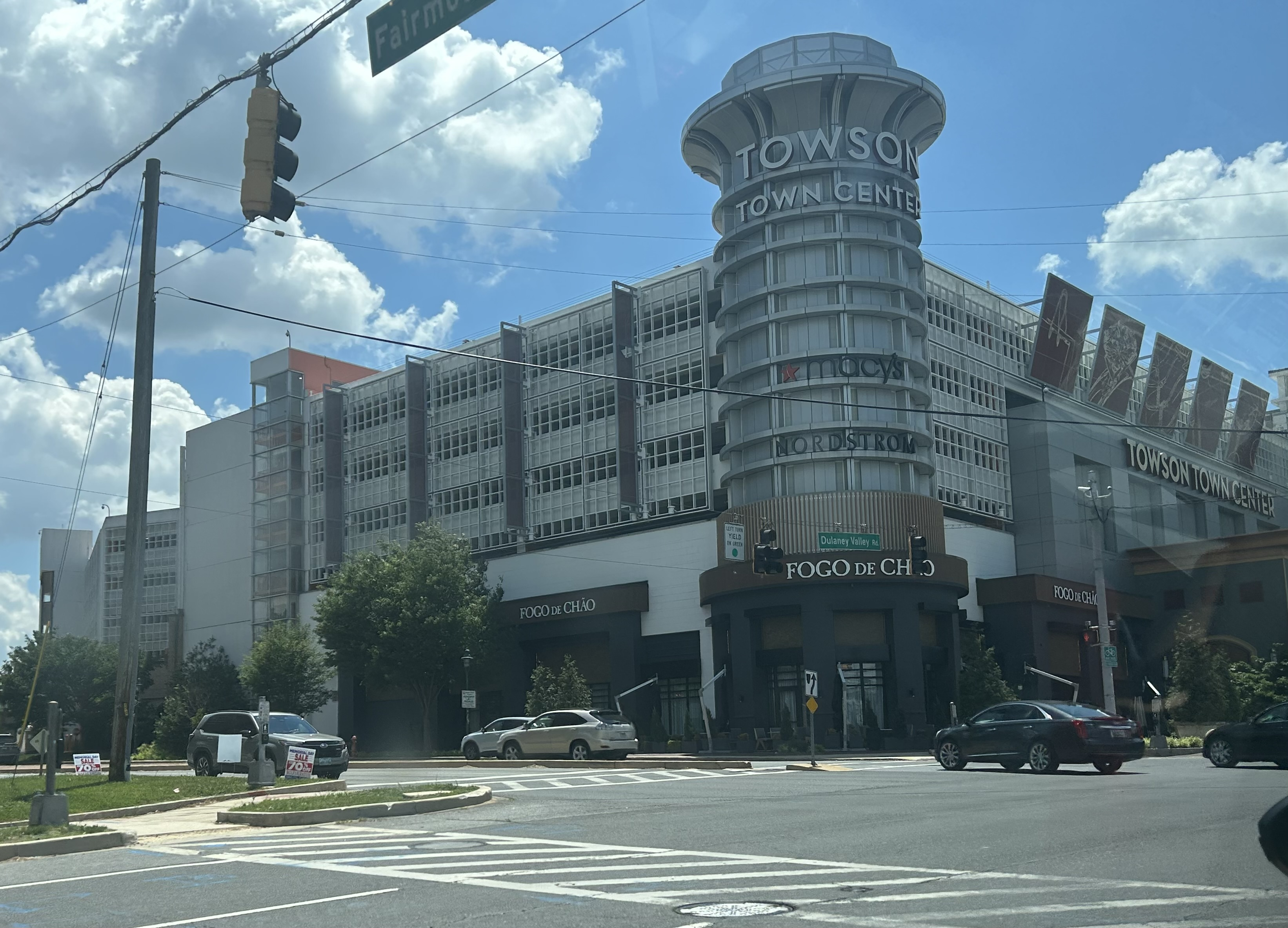
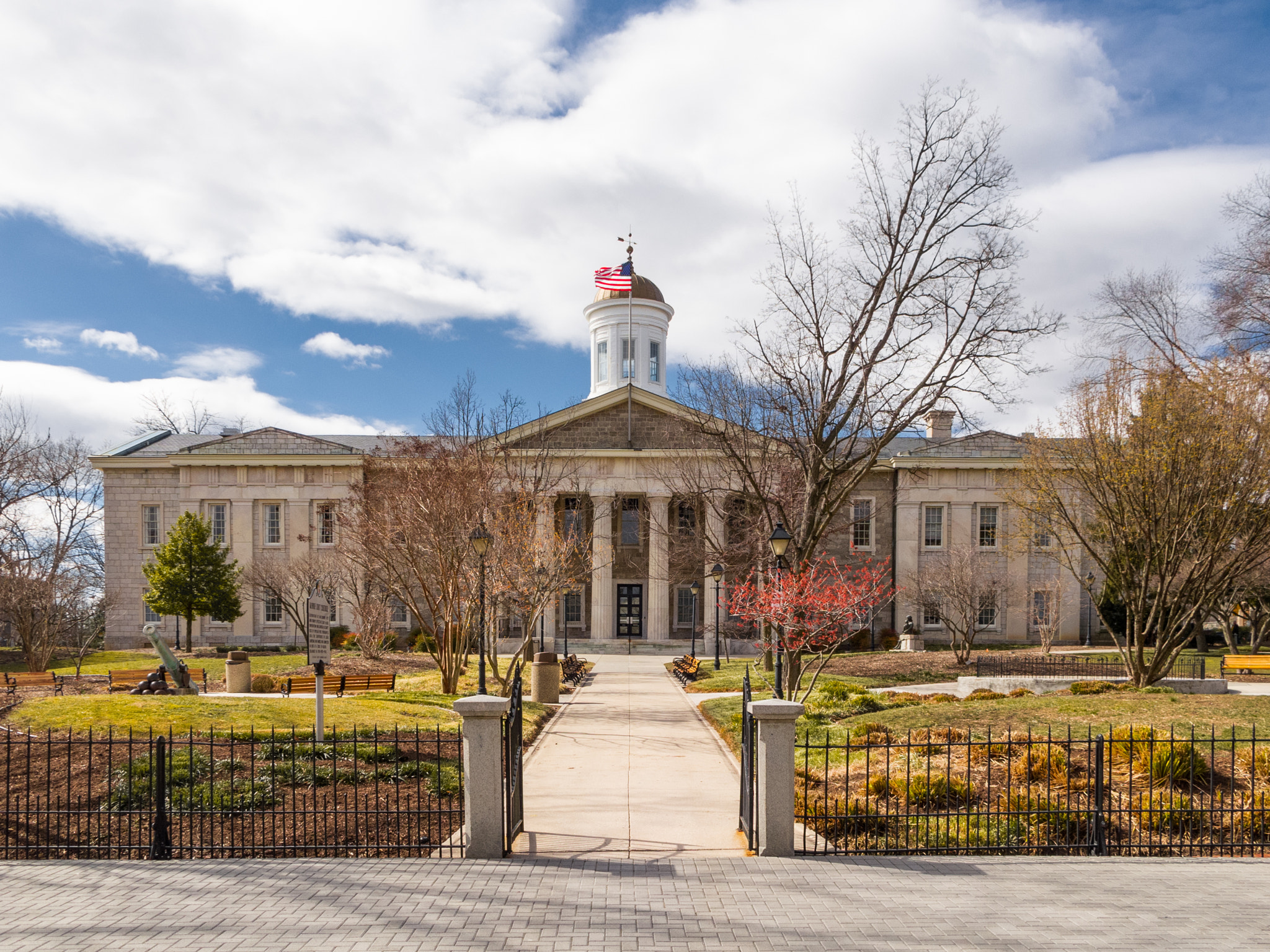
- From the top, left to right: View of the largely vacant Towson Square; Towson skyline from the northwest on York Road and Stephen's Hall of Towson University; Wheeler Hall of Loyola Blakefield and Towson Town Center from Dulaney Valley Road; Towson District Courthouse

- Location within Baltimore County
- Coordinates: 39°23′35″N 76°36′34″W
- Country: United States
- State: Maryland
- County: Baltimore

Area
  - Total: 14.29 sq mi (37.01 km^{2})
  - Land: 14.15 sq mi (36.66 km^{2})
  - Water: 0.14 sq mi (0.35 km^{2})
- Elevation: 463 ft (141 m)

Population (2020)
  - Total: 59,553
  - Density: 4,207.7/sq mi (1,624.62/km^{2})
- Time zone: UTC−5 (Eastern (EST))
  - Summer (DST): UTC−4 (EDT)
- ZIP codes: 21286, 21204, 21252, 21212, 21209, 21210, 21239 (county)
- Area codes: 410, 443, and 667
- FIPS code: 24-78425
- GNIS feature ID: 0591420

Towson (/ˈtaʊsən/) is an unincorporated community and a census-designated place in Baltimore County, Maryland, United States. The population was 59,533 in the 2020 census. It is the county seat of Baltimore County and the second-most populous unincorporated county seat in the United States (after Ellicott City, the seat of nearby Howard County, southwest of Baltimore).

== History ==
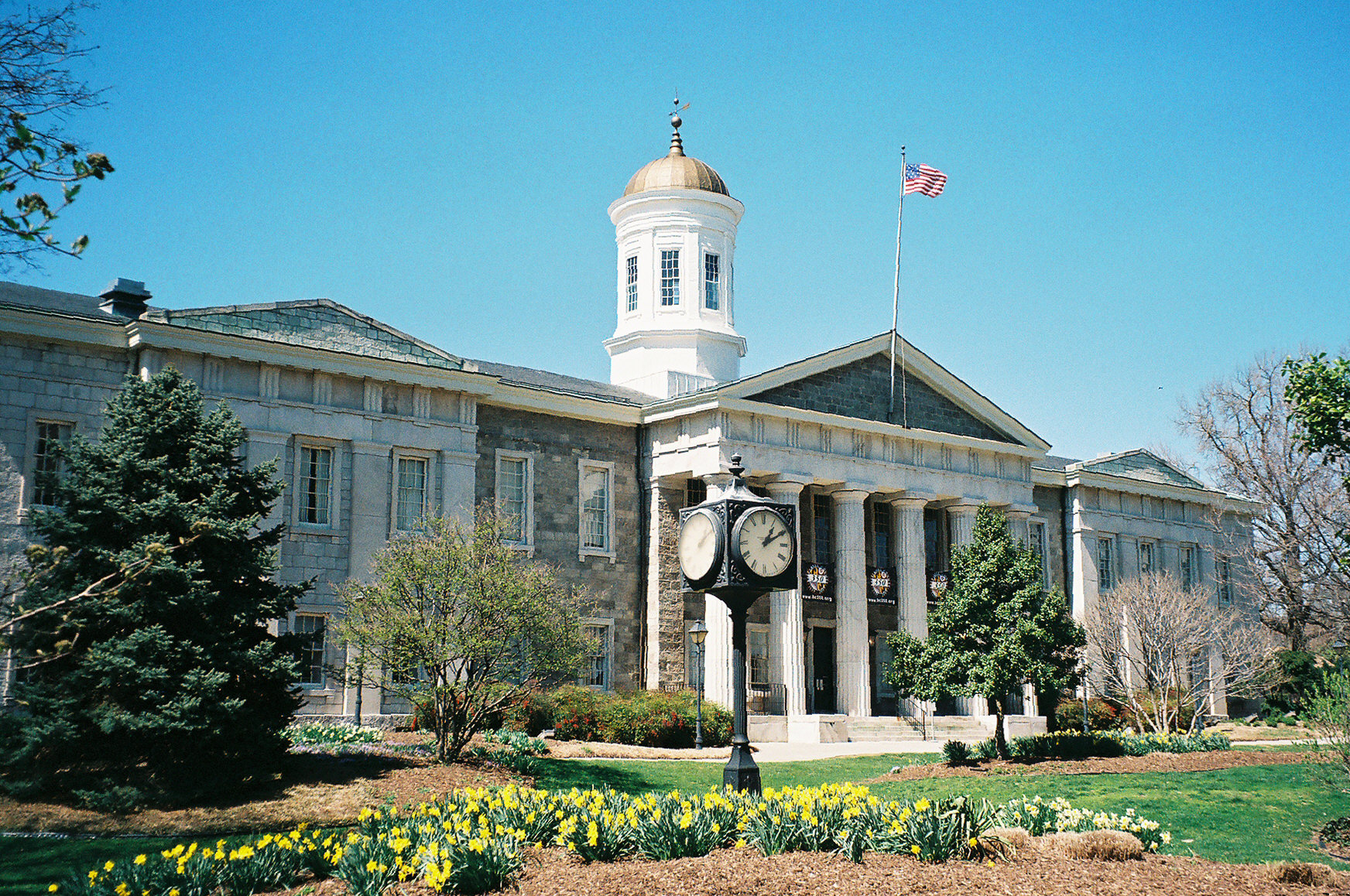
The historic 1854 Baltimore County Courthouse located in Towson, Maryland

=== 1600s ===
The first inhabitants of the future Towson and central Baltimore County region were the Susquehannock people, who hunted in the area. Their region included all of Baltimore County, though their primary settlement was farther northeast along the Susquehanna River.

=== 1700s ===
Towson was settled in 1752 when Pennsylvania brothers, William and Thomas Towson, began farming an area of Sater's Hill, northeast of the present-day York and Joppa roads. William's son, Ezekiel, opened the Towson Hotel to serve the growing number of farmers bringing their produce and livestock to the port of Baltimore. He built the hotel at current-day Shealy Avenue and York Road, near the area's main crossroads. The village became known as "Towsontown". The property in West Towson came from two land grants: 400-acre Gott's Hope in 1719, and Gunner's Range in 1706.

In 1790, businessman Charles Ridgely completed the Hampton Mansion just north of Towsontown, the largest private house in America at the time. The Ridgelys lived there for six generations, until 1948. It is now preserved as the Hampton National Historic Site and open to the public.

=== 1800s ===
Grafton Marsh, a surgeon during the War of 1812, and his brother Josiah Marsh settled their families in a collection of early houses known as Gott's Hope that was part of a group along Joppa Road. They consolidated four of the structures into a larger dwelling that they called "Marshmont". The brothers went into business together as medical practitioners. Neither had any heirs but were joined in practice later by their nephew, Dr. Grafton Marsh Bosley, who eventually inherited the medical practice, the Marshmont compound, and a 140-acre farm. The farm extended west of York Road, south of Joppa Road, north of the Sheppard Pratt Hospital, and east of Woodbine Avenue. In 1869, Bosley and his wife Margaret Nicholson then built a new home in an area of the property known as "Highlands" or "Highland Park", which they named "Uplands".

The ratification of the second Maryland Constitution of 1851 provided for the jurisdictional separation of the city of Baltimore. Since 1767, the city (then Baltimore Town), had served as the county seat. Several tortured sets of negotiations occurred to divide the various assets of the city and the county, such as the downtown courthouse of 1805, the city/county jail of 1801 along the Jones Falls (at East Madison Street) and the almshouse, which was also jointly owned. After a series of elections and referendums, on February 13, 1854, Towson became, by popular vote, the choice of the remaining, now mostly rural, eastern, northern and western portions of the county as the new county seat of Baltimore County.

The Baltimore County Courthouse, still in use by 2015, with its various annexes (and the separate county courts and administrative building), was originally designed by the local city architectural firm of Dixon, Balbirnie and Dixon. It was completed within a year, constructed of limestone and marble donated by the well-known Ridgely family of nearby Hampton Mansion, on land donated by Towson doctor Grafton Marsh Bosley. The courthouse was subsequently enlarged in 1910 through additional designs for north and south wings by well-known and regarded city architects, Baldwin & Pennington. Additional expansions later in 1926 and 1958 eventually created an H-shaped plan for the courthouse. An additional modernistic Baltimore County Courts Building, with room for the new charter government since 1956 and administration of a county executive and county council, plus administrative and executive departments, was erected in 1970–71 across a plaza to the west of the older historic courthouse.

The old Baltimore County Jail was built in 1855, and was later replaced in the 1980s by a new modern Baltimore County Detention Center, north of the town on Kenilworth Drive, with an addition constructed in the 2010s.

From 1850 to 1874, another notable land owner, Amos Matthews, had a farm of 150 acres (0.61 km^{2}) that—with the exception of the 17-acre (69,000 m^{2}) largely natural parcel where the Kelso Home for Girls (currently Towson YMCA), was later erected —was wholly developed into the neighborhoods of West Towson, Southland Hills and other subdivisions, beginning in the middle 1920s.

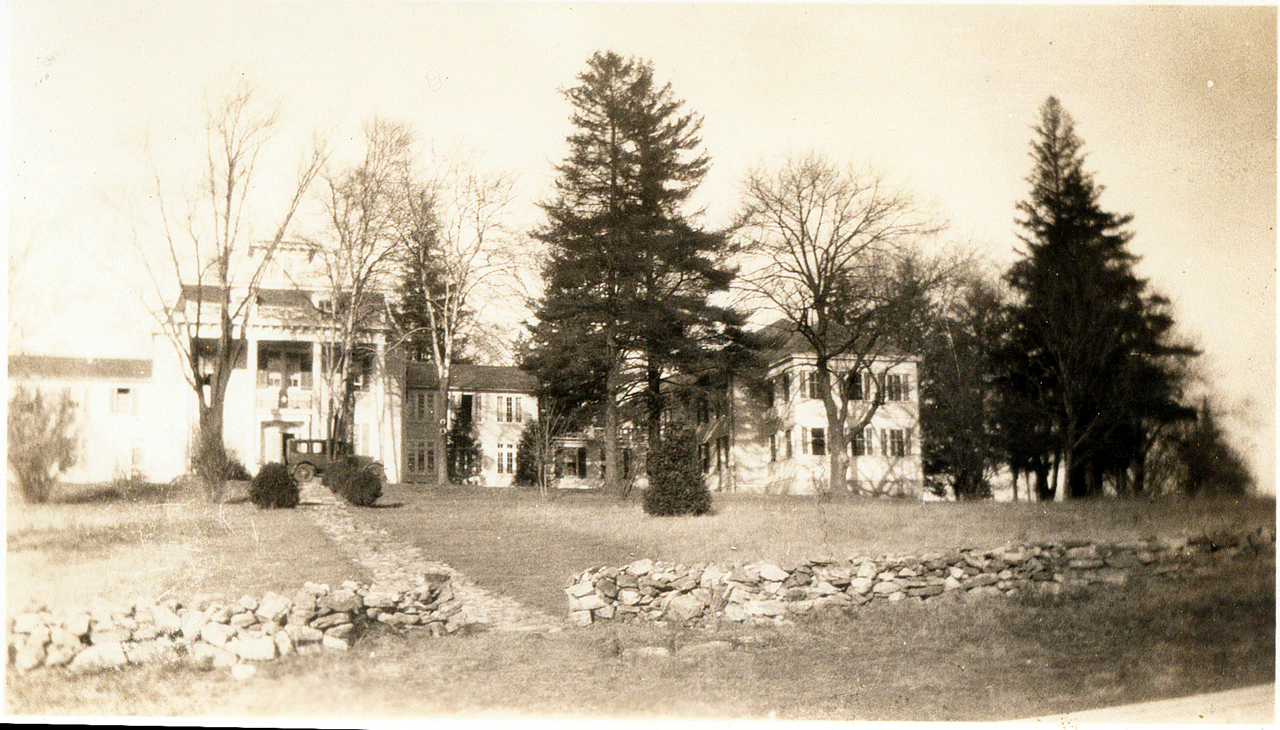
The former Grafton Bosley estate "Uplands", Towson Maryland, which later became the Presbyterian Home of Maryland (photo c. 1930)

During the Civil War, Towson was the scene of two minor engagements. Many local citizens were sympathetic to the Southern Confederate cause, so much so that Ady's Hotel (later named the Towson Hotel) and the current site of the 1920s-era Towson Theatre (later the Recher Theatre), flew the Southern flag. The Union Army found it necessary to overtake the town by force on June 2, 1861. During the raid, the Union Army seized weapons from citizens at Ady's Hotel. A local paper, in jest, refers to the "strongly fortified and almost impregnable city of Towsontown" and downplays the need for the attack, stating, "the distinguished Straw, with only two hundred and fifty men, has taken a whole city and nearly frightened two old women out of their wits."

The second engagement took place around July 12, 1864, between Union and Confederate forces. On July 10, 1864, a 135-man Confederate cavalry detachment attacked the Northern Central Railway to the north in nearby Cockeysville, under orders from Gen. Bradley T. Johnson, of Frederick, Maryland. The First and Second Maryland Cavalry, led by Baltimore County native and pre-war member of the Towson Horse Guards, Maj. Harry W. Gilmor, of Glen Ellen, attacked strategic targets throughout Baltimore and Harford counties, including cutting telegraph wires along Harford Road, capturing two trains and a Union general, and destroying a railroad bridge in Joppa, Maryland. Following what became known as Gilmor's Raid, the cavalry encamped in Towson overnight at Ady's Hotel, where his men rested and Gilmor met with friends.

The next day, a large federal cavalry unit was dispatched from Baltimore to overtake Gilmor's forces. Though outnumbered by more than two to one, the Confederate cavalry attacked the federal unit, breaking the federal unit and chasing them down York Road to around current-day Woodbourne Avenue, within Baltimore city limits. Gilmor's forces traveled south along York Road as far south as Govans, before heading west to rejoin Gen. Johnson's main force.

Following the war, Gilmor served as the Baltimore City Police Commissioner in the 1870s.

The Towson fire of 1878 destroyed most of the 500 block along the York Turnpike, causing an estimated $38,000 in damage.

During the summer of 1894, the Towson Water Company laid wooden pipes and installed fire hydrants connected to an artesian well near Aigburth Vale. On November 2, 1894, Towson was supplied with electric service through connection with the Mount Washington Electric Light and Power Company.

=== 1900s ===
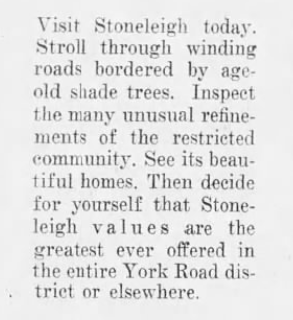
A February 13, 1927 advertisement in the Baltimore Sun for racially restricted houses in the Stoneleigh section of Towson.

At the beginning of the century, Towson remained largely a rural community. Land continued to be sold by the acre, rather than as home parcels. Most residences lay within Towson proper: no houses existed west of Central Avenue along Allegheny or Pennsylvania Avenues, and there were only three homes along the West Chesapeake Avenue corridor.

In the 1910s, the Maryland State Normal School (MSNS) (now known as Towson University) was relocated to Towson. The Maryland Legislature had established the MSNS in 1865 as Maryland's first teacher-training school, or normal school. The institution officially opened its doors on January 15, 1866, however as time passed enrollment in the school grew exponentially, which rendered the facilities inadequate. In 1910, the General Assembly formed a committee to oversee site selection, budget, and design plans for a new campus. It settled on an 80-acre (320,000 m^{2}) site in Towson. The General Assembly financed the $600,000 move in 1912. Construction then began in 1913 on the Administration Building, now known as Stephens Hall. In September 1915, the new campus, comprising Stephens Hall, Newell Hall, and the power plant, began classes. The college underwent numerous name changes, settling on Towson University in 1997.

As the growth of Baltimore's suburbs became more pronounced after World War II, considerable office development took place in Towson's central core area. Many of the large Victorian and colonial-style residences in the vicinity of the Court House were demolished in the 1980s and 1990s to make way for offices and parking.

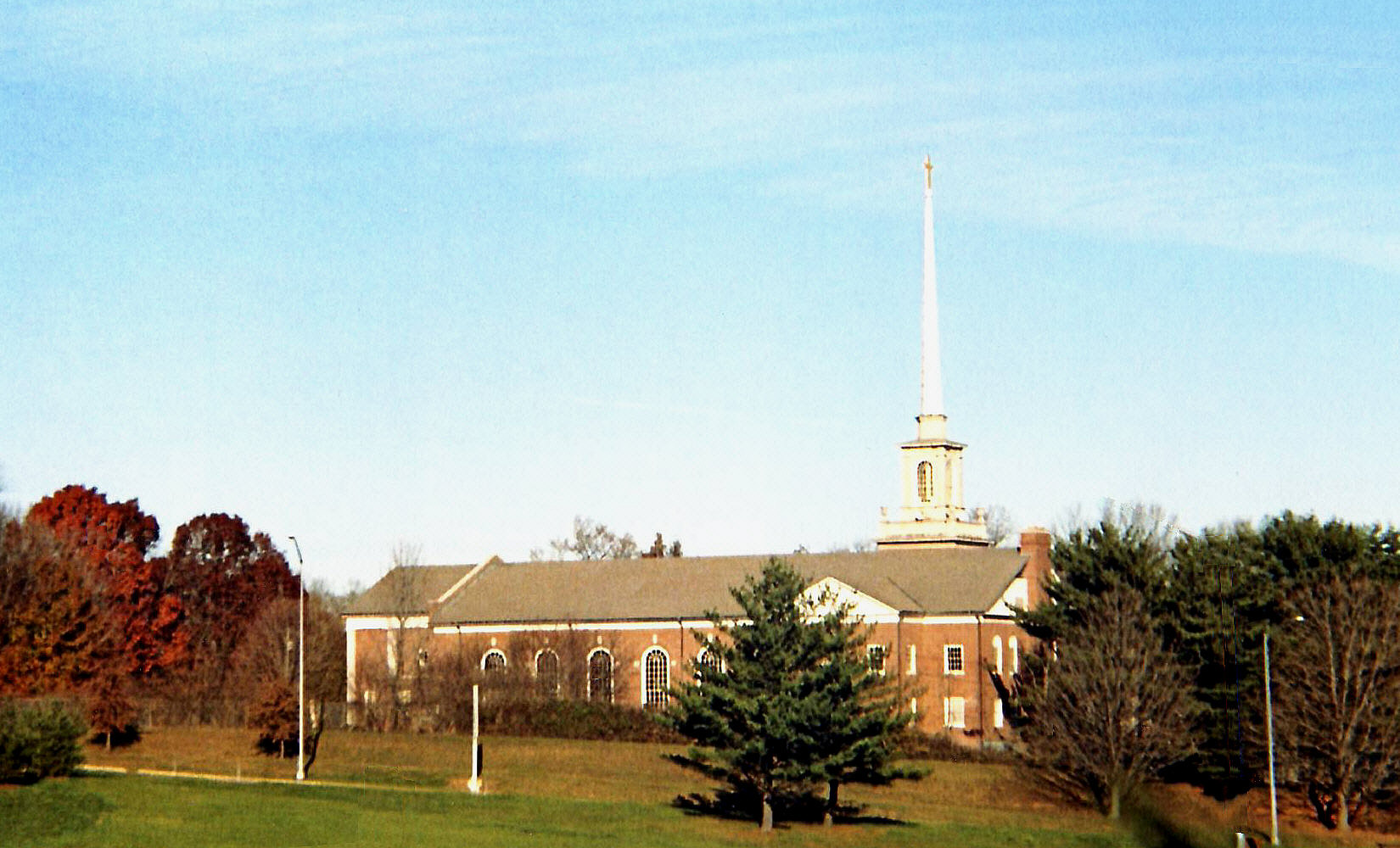
Towson United Methodist Church

In 1839, Epsom Chapel became the first Christian house of worship in Towson, used by various denominations. Due to population growth in the late 19th and early 20th centuries, several churches were built to serve the community, such as Calvary Baptist Church, Immaculate Conception Catholic Church, Trinity Episcopal Church, First Methodist Church, and Towson Presbyterian Church. Epsom Chapel was demolished in 1950 when Goucher College sold a portion of its property for development of the Towson Plaza shopping center, now Towson Town Center. First Methodist Church moved in 1958 to land also acquired from Goucher College, and is now Towson United Methodist Church.

Author Robert Coston, who grew up in the area of Towson now called "Historic East Towson", recalled in an interview the unique African-American history of that area during the mid-century:

I think that the Towson, Maryland area that I am familiar with differs from other parts of Maryland because of the proximity to one of the largest slave plantations in the country. The Ridgely Plantation which owned all of the property from Baltimore County to Baltimore City and other surrounding areas. ... This was a very unique place of which I have never heard of any equal to it. Every African American school age child in Baltimore County had to attend school at some point at Carver in East Towson. ... I realize now that as a youngster the older African Americans avoided talking about slavery or the nearby Ridgely Plantation because they themselves were not too far removed from slavery itself.

Prior to the passage of the Fair Housing Act of 1968, racially restrictive covenants were used in Towson to exclude African-Americans and other minorities.

== Geography ==
Towson is located at 39°23′35″N 76°36′34″W (39.392980, −76.609562).

According to the United States Census Bureau, the CDP has a total area of 14.2 square miles (37 km^{2}), of which 14.0 square miles (36 km^{2}) is land and 0.2 square miles (0.52 km^{2}) (1.06%) is water.

The community is located immediately north of Baltimore City, inside the Beltway (I-695), east of I-83 and along York Road. Its census boundaries include Pikesville to the west, Lutherville and Hampton to the north, Parkville to the east, and Baltimore to the south.

Major neighborhoods in Towson include: Anneslie, Idlewylde, Fellowship Forest, Greenbrier, Southland Hills, Rodgers Forge, Stoneleigh, Wiltondale, Towson Manor Village, Hunt Crest Estates, Knollwood-Donnybrook, Campus Hills, East Towson, Knettishall, Loch Raven Village and West Towson. Ruxton and Riderwood, which lie to the west, are considered a part of Towson. Eudowood is a Towson neighborhood named after Eudocia, the wife of Dr. John T. Stansbury, on whose former estate it is situated.

=== Climate ===
The climate in this area is characterized by hot, humid summers and generally mild to cool winters. According to the Köppen Climate Classification system Towson has a humid subtropical climate, abbreviated "Cfa" on climate maps.

== Government ==
Both the Baltimore County Public Schools, and the Baltimore County Police Department possess headquarters that are located in Towson.

== Demographics ==
Historical population
Census	Pop.	Note	%±
1960	19,090		—
1970	77,768		307.4%
1980	51,083		−34.3%
1990	49,445		−3.2%
2000	51,793		4.7%
2010	55,197		6.6%
2020	59,553		7.9%
Census Boundaries in 1970 extended beyond the community proper

=== Racial and ethnic composition ===
Towson CDP, Maryland – Racial and ethnic composition Note: the US Census treats Hispanic/Latino as an ethnic category. This table excludes Latinos from the racial categories and assigns them to a separate category. Hispanics/Latinos may be of any race.
Race / Ethnicity (NH = Non-Hispanic)	Pop 2000	Pop 2010	Pop 2020	% 2000	% 2010	% 2020
White alone (NH)	44,376	43,301	39,503	85.68%	78.45%	66.33%
Black or African American alone (NH)	3,848	5,948	10,218	7.43%	10.78%	17.16%
Native American or Alaska Native alone (NH)	43	73	67	0.08%	0.13%	0.11%
Asian alone (NH)	1,934	2,819	3,760	3.73%	5.11%	6.31%
Native Hawaiian or Pacific Islander alone (NH)	11	20	13	0.02%	0.04%	0.02%
Other race alone (NH)	66	102	219	0.13%	0.18%	0.37%
Mixed race or Multiracial (NH)	530	1,051	2,510	1.02%	1.90%	4.21%
Hispanic or Latino (any race)	985	1,883	3,263	1.90%	3.41%	5.48%
Total	51,793	55,197	59,553	100.00%	100.00%	100.00%

=== 2020 census ===
As of the 2020 census, Towson had a population of 59,553. The median age was 33.6 years. 17.5% of residents were under the age of 18 and 17.1% of residents were 65 years of age or older. For every 100 females there were 85.1 males, and for every 100 females age 18 and over there were 81.7 males age 18 and over.

100.0% of residents lived in urban areas, while 0.0% lived in rural areas.

There were 22,477 households in Towson, of which 26.8% had children under the age of 18 living in them. Of all households, 41.6% were married-couple households, 19.2% were households with a male householder and no spouse or partner present, and 33.7% were households with a female householder and no spouse or partner present. About 34.3% of all households were made up of individuals and 15.1% had someone living alone who was 65 years of age or older.

There were 24,539 housing units, of which 8.4% were vacant. The homeowner vacancy rate was 1.5% and the rental vacancy rate was 10.4%.

Racial composition as of the 2020 census
Race	Number	Percent
White	40,286	67.6%
Black or African American	10,448	17.5%
American Indian and Alaska Native	145	0.2%
Asian	3,778	6.3%
Native Hawaiian and Other Pacific Islander	13	0.0%
Some other race	1,065	1.8%
Two or more races	3,818	6.4%
Hispanic or Latino (of any race)	3,263	5.5%

=== Education and income ===
The percent of persons age 25 years and over with a high school diploma or higher was 96.5%. 66.9% of people had a bachelor's degree or higher. The median household income was $93,435 and per capita income was 52,444. 11.3% of people were living in poverty.

=== 2000 census ===
As of the census of 2000, there were 51,793 people, 21,063 households, and 11,331 families residing in the CDP. The population density was 3,688.7 inhabitants per square mile (1,424.2/km^{2}). There were 21,997 housing units at an average density of 1,566.6 per square mile (604.9/km^{2}). The racial makeup of the CDP was 86.9% White, 7.53% African American, 0.10% Native American, 3.7% Asian, and 1.9% Hispanic.

There were 21,063 households, out of which 23.1% had children under the age of 18 living with them, 43.6% were married couples living together, 7.8% had a female householder with no husband present, and 46.2% were non-families. 36.4% of all households were made up of individuals, and 17.3% had someone living alone who was 65 years of age or older. The average household size was 2.16 and the average family size was 2.87.

In the CDP, the population was spread out, with 17.4% under the age of 18, 17.5% from 18 to 24, 24.9% from 25 to 44, 20.1% from 45 to 64, and 20.1% who were 65 years of age or older. The median age was 38 years. For every 100 females, there were 82.8 males. For every 100 females age 18 and over, there were 78.8 males.

The median income for a household in the CDP was $53,775, and the median income for a family was $75,832 (these figures had risen to $64,313 and $98,744 respectively as of a 2007 estimate). Males had a median income of $49,554 versus $38,172 for females. The per capita income for the CDP was $32,502. About 2.5% of families and 7.7% of the population were below the poverty line, including 3.8% of those under age 18 and 4.7% of those age 65 or over.

== Transportation ==
=== Roads ===
Major roads in Towson include:

- Allegheny Avenue
- Auburn Drive
- Bellona Avenue
- Bosley Avenue
- Burke Avenue
- Charles Street (MD-139)
- Chesapeake Avenue
- Cromwell Bridge Road
- Dulaney Valley Road (MD-146)
- Fairmount Avenue
- Goucher Boulevard
- Hillen Road
- Joppa Road
- Loch Raven Boulevard
- Osler Drive
- Pennsylvania Avenue
- Providence Road
- Putty Hill Avenue
- Stevenson Lane
- Towsontown Boulevard
- Washington Avenue
- York Road (MD-45)

=== Public transportation ===
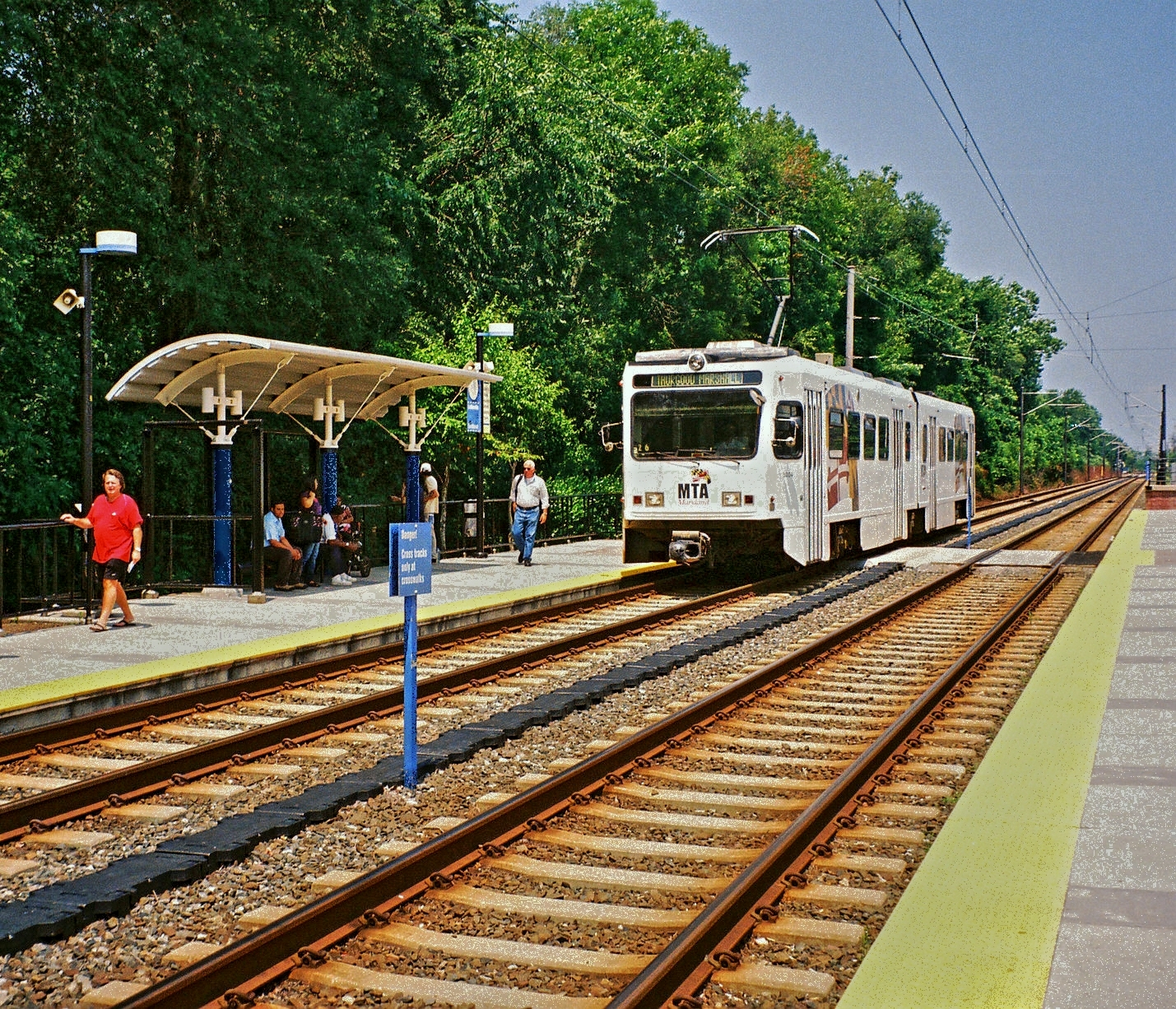
The Baltimore Light Rail provides service at the Lutherville Station.

The Towson area has several bus lines operated by the Maryland Transit Administration. These include:

- Route 3, which serves the Loch Raven Boulevard corridor, with selected trips along Joppa Road
- Route 8, which operates along York Road to Lutherville and downtown Baltimore (formerly the #8 streetcar line)
- Route 11, which serves Towsontown Boulevard, the Charles Street corridor, and GBMC hospital
- Route 12, which operates along York and Dulaney Valley Roads to Stella Maris Hospice at the times needed for the facility's change of shift.
- Route 48 QuickBus, which operates between Towson Town Center and downtown Baltimore along the same route as #8, except with limited stops for a speedier trip
- Route 55, which operates cross-county service to Parkville, Overlea, Rosedale, and Essex

Towson also has light rail service to downtown Baltimore and BWI Airport along its periphery via the Lutherville and Falls Road stops, though there are no stops actually in Towson.

Towson University and Goucher College also operate bus services for their students, and the Collegetown Shuttle has several stops in the area.

In October 2021, Towson began providing a free bus service circulating through Towson called the Towson Loop.

=== Pedestrians and bicycles ===
The Towson Bike Beltway opened in September 2014. It includes the addition of bicycle lanes on several major streets encircling the downtown area. The main loop includes Bosley Avenue (which is part of Maryland Route 45 Bypass), Fairmount Avenue, and Goucher Boulevard; these three roads will receive full bike lanes. The rest of the loop, utilizing Hillen Road and Towsontown Boulevard, will receive signage alerting motorists to expect an increase in bicycle traffic on those roads. After this initial construction, several spurs are envisioned to branch from the main loop, with several reaching as far south as the Baltimore city line.

=== "Ma and Pa" Railroad ===
"Ma & Pa" train crossing York Road, Towson, in the 1950s — the bridge was removed in 1959

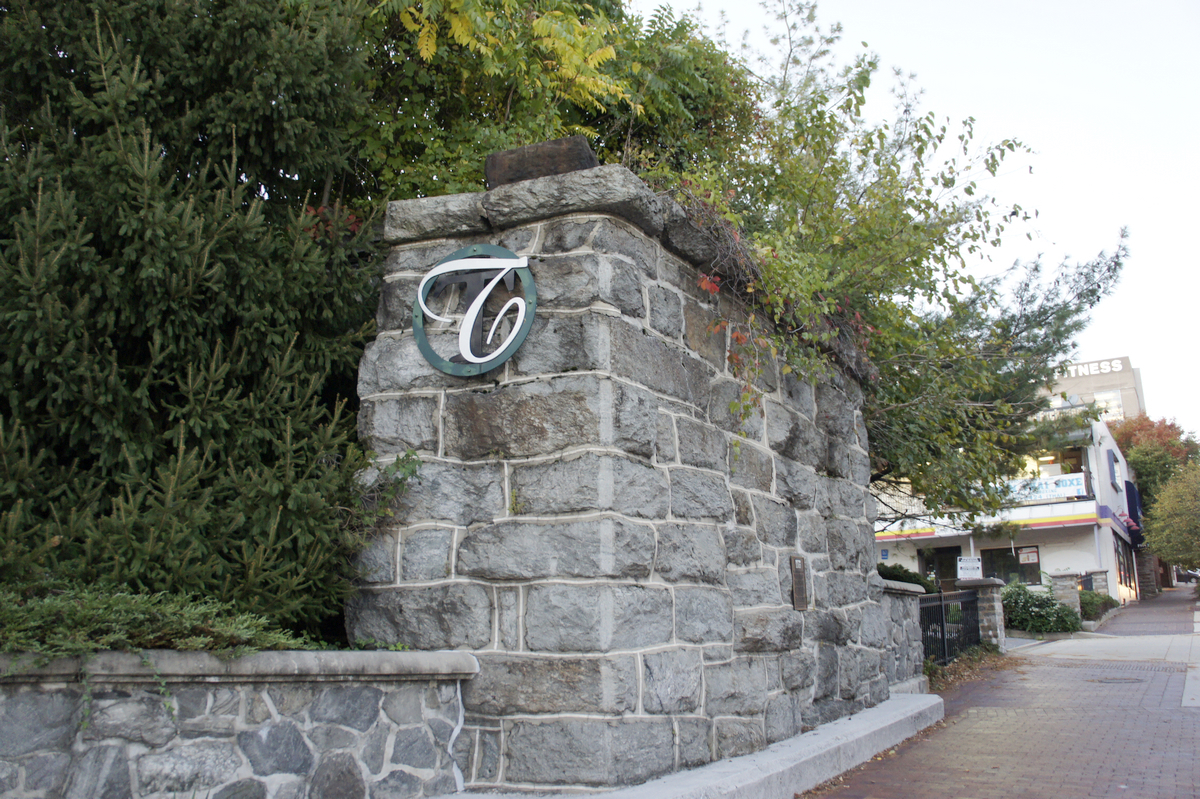
The remaining bridge abutments in 2014

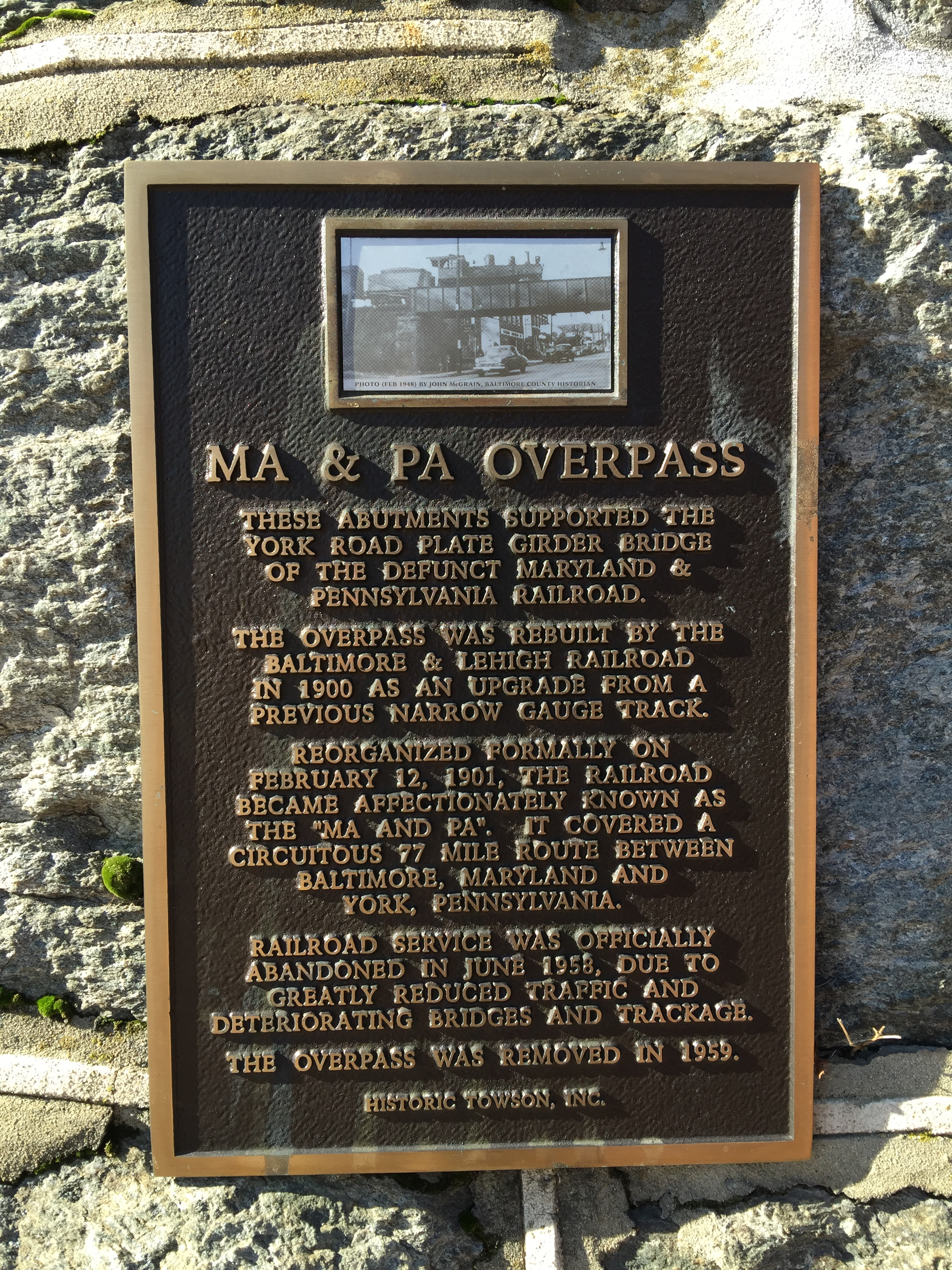
Ma and Pa Abutment Commemorative Plaque in Towson

Railroad service began to Towson on April 17, 1882, with construction of the Baltimore & Delta Railway Company, soon renamed the Baltimore & Lehigh Railroad, and later reorganized as the Maryland and Pennsylvania Railroad. The "Ma and Pa", as it was affectionately known locally, formerly operated between Baltimore and York, Pennsylvania, through Towson. Its passenger station was located just west of York Road on Susquehanna Avenue. Passenger service was discontinued on August 31, 1954, and the railroad line through Towson was finally abandoned altogether on June 11, 1958, leaving only the stone abutments where the tracks crossed York Road on a steel girder bridge. One passenger on the last passenger train recalled that many riders came from as far away as Boston and Washington, D.C., to participate in the historic event, along with members of the National Railway Historical Society. Historic Towson, a local group of history buffs, installed a bronze plaque on the west abutment in 1999, commemorating the defunct railroad's place in Towson's history.

== Shopping and other attractions ==
The Hampton Plaza

Towson features some of Baltimore County's largest shopping centers as well as other popular venues of interest. These include:

=== Hampton Mansion ===
Hampton National Historic Site is operated by the U.S. National Park Service. The home and grounds were formerly the core of the vast Ridgely estate. The site includes the Ridgely's 18th-century Georgian manor house, gardens, grounds, and the original stone slave quarters. The National Park Service offers free admission and guided tours.

=== Towson Town Center ===
Towson Town Center is Baltimore County's largest indoor mall, with four stories of shops and a parking garage. Nearby is Allegheny Avenue, the main street of downtown Towson, with a variety of eateries and stores.

=== Towson Square ===
A new outdoor mall, Towson Square, was under construction in 2013. After quick construction, the Square opened in October 2014.

=== The Shops at Kenilworth ===
The Shops at Kenilworth, formerly known as Kenilworth Park and also as Kenilworth Bazaar, is a small indoor mall located on Kenilworth Drive.

=== Towson Place ===
Towson Place is a major shopping area near Joppa Road, Goucher Boulevard, and Putty Hill Avenue. Built on the site of the Eudowood Sanatarium, the original Eudowood Plaza shopping center was an open mall anchored by Montgomery Ward. Renovated in the early 1980s to an indoor mall and renamed Towson Marketplace, the location was then redeveloped in 1998 as an open-air collection of big box stores and other stores and restaurants. Towson Place is next to Calvert Hall College High School, a Roman Catholic Lasallian Christian Brothers secondary school which moved in 1960 to its suburban location from its original site, founded 1845 in the city's Mount Vernon-Belvedere neighborhood on Cathedral Street at West Mulberry Street.

=== TU Arena and Unitas Stadium ===
Towson University's arena TU Arena and stadium Johnny Unitas Stadium are both the main venues for Towson Tigers athletics and other events. TU's Towson Center formerly held the Towson Tigers' men's and women's basketball teams, women's gymnastics and women's volleyball teams.

== Education ==
=== Colleges and universities ===
Towson University is a public school in southern Towson. Its student population is greater than 20,000, making it the second largest institution in the University System of Maryland. TU is home to the largest business school in the state, with 2,500 students. It was founded in 1866 as the Maryland State Normal School for the training of teachers. Originally the school was located at several sites in the city. It underwent several name changes before moving in 1915 to an expansive campus just south of Towson on the west side of York Road. The administration and classroom structure, later named Stephens Hall, has a cupola in red brick with limestone trim in English Tudor/Elizabethan/Jacobethan architecture style, and was by several other similar campus buildings to the northeast in similar style.

Also located in Towson is Goucher College, a small private liberal arts school that was founded in 1885. Goucher was a women's college until it went coeducational in 1986. It was established as the Women's College of Baltimore, and its founders, pastors John Goucher, who would later become its namesake, and John B. Van Meter were closely affiliated with Methodist Episcopal Church. The school was originally based in Baltimore city and moved to its current campus in Towson in 1953. The old campus in Baltimore, which the school no longer owns or occupies, is now known as Old Goucher and is a registered historic district. The current 287-acre campus of the school in Towson was also notably registered as a historic district and in 2007 it was added to the National Register of Historic Places for its unique and innovative architecture.

=== Public schools ===
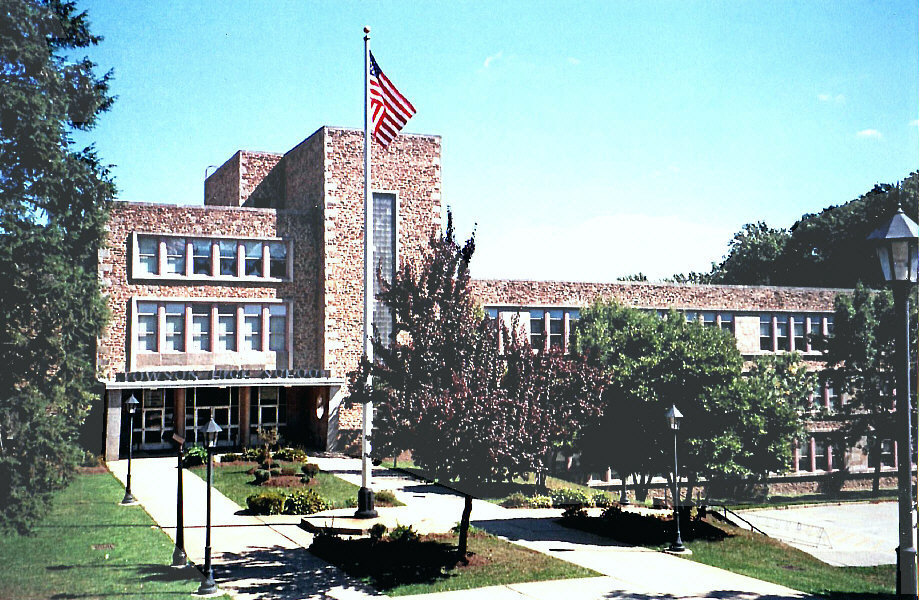
Towson High School

Towson is served by the Baltimore County Public Schools district, and the Baltimore County Board of Education headquarters is also located there. There are three high schools. Towson High School, founded in 1873, was the first secondary school provided. It is the second oldest in the school system, and Towson's largest, with its most recent stone structure constructed in 1949. Loch Raven High School dates from 1972. The Carver Center for Arts and Technology is a local magnet school and vocational-technical secondary school in a newly constructed building. It was established in 1984 and known as the Central Technical High School. It was renamed for the African-American scientist George Washington Carver (1864–1943), and to remember the previous Carver High School in Towson. That school had served black residents of the county for several decades in the previously racially segregated public school system before the early 1960s, when the suburban county lagged behind fully integrating after the 1954 landmark Brown vs. Board of Education decision by the U.S. Supreme Court.

Towson is served by nine public elementary schools in the school district: Rodgers Forge, Stoneleigh, Riderwood, Hampton, Lutherville Lab, West Towson, Halstead Academy, Pleasant Plains and Cromwell Valley Regional Magnet School of Technology, which serves students from all over Baltimore County.

Towson is served by two public middle schools, Dumbarton Middle School and Loch Raven Technical Academy. Some students are also zoned to attend Ridgely Middle School in Lutherville further north.

Also located in Towson is Ridge Ruxton School, a special education school serving the central area of Baltimore County, including Reisterstown, Owings Mills, Parkville, Cockeysville, and Hunt Valley. The school describes itself as offering "programs for students from three to twenty-one years of age who have been identified as developmentally delayed, intellectually limited, autistic-like, and/or multi-handicapped".

=== Private schools ===
The Towson area has a number of long-established private schools at the secondary school level, including Loyola Blakefield, Calvert Hall College High School, Concordia Preparatory School, and Notre Dame Preparatory School.

== Notable people ==
- Spiro Agnew (1918–1996), Vice President of the United States, 1969–1973
- All Time Low, pop punk band
- Taylor Calheira (born 2002), soccer player
- Albert Cassell (1895–1969), architect
- William Purington Cole Jr. (1889–1957), U.S. Congressman for Maryland's 2nd District, 1927–1929 and 1931–1942
- Mel Kiper Jr. (born 1960), ESPN draft analyst
- Divine (1945–1988), actor, the drag persona of Harris Glenn Milstead
- Jeff Donnell (1921–1988), film and TV actress
- Charles S. Dutton, actor who attended Towson University
- F. Scott Fitzgerald (1896–1940), writer
- Trentyn Flowers, NBA small forward
- Jane Frank (1918–1986), artist
- Sally Lucas Jean (18 June 1878 – 5 July 1971), Health educator and nurse
- Bill Kramer, CEO of the Academy of Motion Picture Arts and Sciences
- Dorothy Lamour (1914–1996), film actress
- G. E. Lowman (1897–1965), radio evangelist
- Luigi Mangione (born 1998), killer of UnitedHealthcare CEO Brian Thompson
- Nicholas Mangione (1925–2008), real estate developer and owner of Turf Valley
- Victor A. McKusick (1921–2008), internist and clinical geneticist
- Gino Marchetti, Hall of Fame NFL defensive end (Dallas Texans, Baltimore Colts)
- Kimmie Meissner, figure skater and last US world figure skating champion
- Ana Montes, Defense Intelligence Agency Senior Analyst convicted of spying for Cuba
- Anita Nall (born 1976), 1992 Summer Olympics gold medalist swimmer
- Michael Phelps (born 1985), swimmer, holds record for most gold Olympic medals, most gold medals in individual events and most career Olympic medals
- Charles Ridgely III (1733–1790), Hampton estate founder and ironworks owner
- Charles Carnan Ridgely (1760–1829), Governor of Maryland, 1815–1818
- Eliza Ridgely of Hampton (1803–1867), 'The Lady with a Harp'
- Thomas Roberts, dayside anchor and occasional prime time fill-in on MSNBC
- Don Shula (1930–2020), head coach and player with the Baltimore Colts; led the Miami Dolphins to the only perfect season in NFL history; holds NFL record for most wins as a head coach
- Major-General Nathan Towson (1784–1854), distinguished officer of the War of 1812; former Paymaster of the US Army; namesake of Fort Towson, Oklahoma
- Johnny Unitas (1933–2002), Hall of Fame NFL quarterback (Baltimore Colts, San Diego Chargers)
- Ricky Van Veen, owner and co-founder of CollegeHumor website
- John Waters, filmmaker and activist

== Medical facilities ==
- Greater Baltimore Medical Center
- St. Joseph Medical Center
- Sheppard Pratt Hospital

== In popular culture ==
- In the 1990s Towson was the center of the Towson Glen Arm music and art collective.
- The fictional character Elaine Benes, of the 1990s NBC sitcom Seinfeld, is from Towson.
- The fictional character Sam Fisher of the Splinter Cell video game series by Ubisoft was born in Towson, and lives in a townhouse near Towson Town Center, as stated in the novelizations of the series by Raymond Benson.
- Tom Clancy's fictional CIA analyst character, Jack Ryan, was born in Towson.
- The 1994 black comedy film Serial Mom, about an unassuming housewife with a penchant for murder, was filmed and set in Towson.
- In the 2012 book Hitman: Damnation, also written by Raymond Benson, fictional presidential nominee Dana Linder was Towson's Representative in the US House and later Maryland's junior US Senator.

== See also ==
- Stoneleigh-Rodgers Forge, a former census-designated place located within Towson during the 1960 census
- Early Drinking Straws and Swizzle Sticks, by Glassips Inc. invented and manufactured in Towson 1930–1979.
- United States Post Office Towson Branch
