= Elizabeth Evitts Dickinson =

American journalist and author

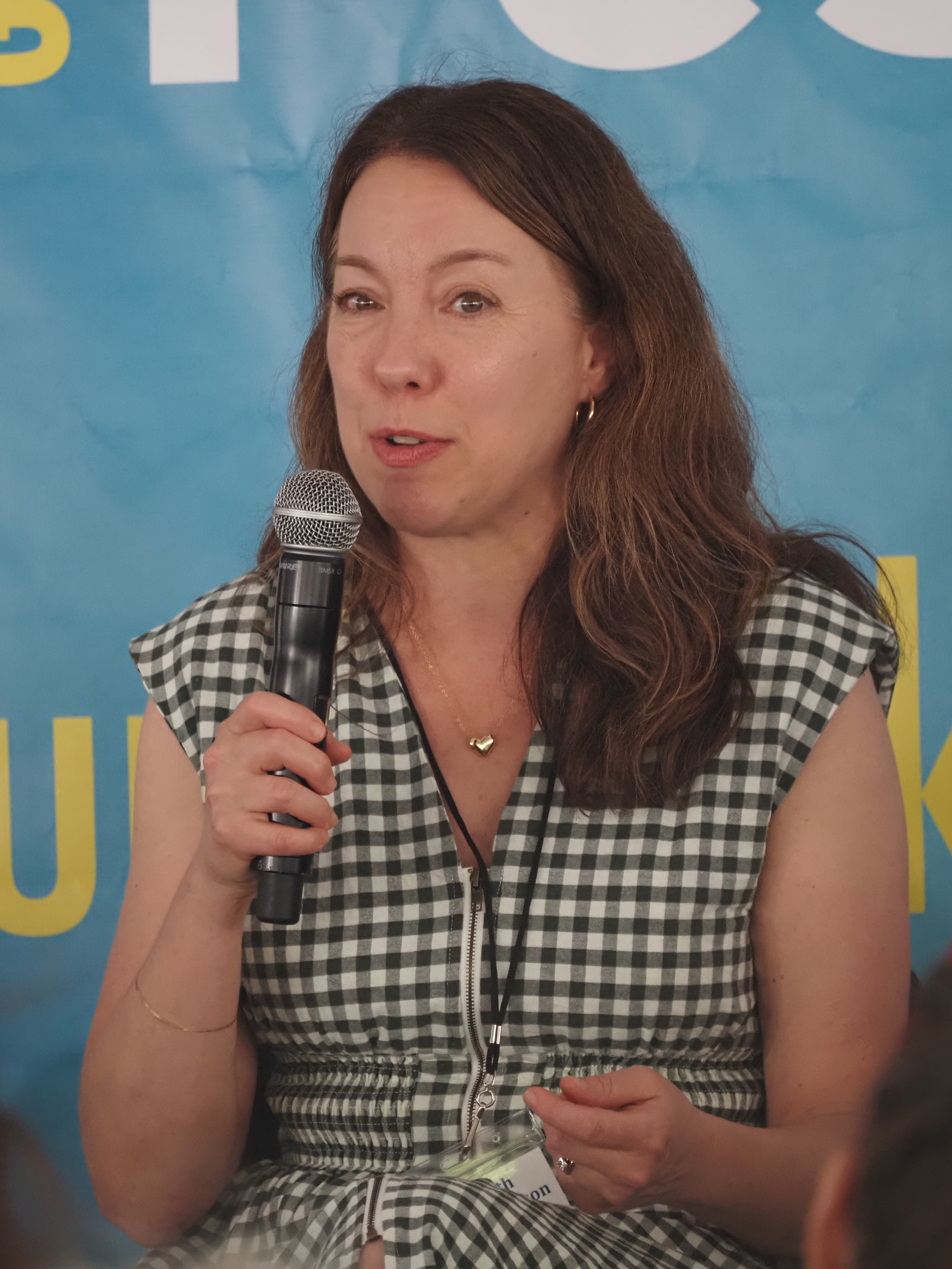
- Website: https://www.eedickinson.com/

Elizabeth Evitts Dickinson is an American journalist and author best known for her writing on subjects related to architecture, design, culture, and the built environment.

== Early years and education ==
Elizabeth A. Evitts born in Roanoke, Virginia. She grew up in the foothills of the Blue Ridge Mountains.

Dickinson attended Towson High School in Baltimore and then spent two years at Randolph-Macon College in Virginia followed by a year studying in Paris through a program at the Sorbonne. She transferred to SUNY Buffalo, where she graduated with a B.A. in French literature, in 1995.

== Career ==
From 2004 to 2007, she worked as an editor at Urbanite magazine, after which she switched to the Architect Magazine.

Her 2018 article on the fashion designer Claire McCardell, "A Dress for Everyone," led Dickinson to propose a book on McCardell, titled Unhemmed, contracted to Simon & Schuster in March 2023.

Dickinson has taught graduate-level writing and journalism at Johns Hopkins University (since 2018) and Maryland Institute College of Art (2009–2016).

== Awards and recognition ==
Her writing has been nominated for the Pushcart Prize 3 times (2013, 2016, 2017) and has won multiple awards, grants, and fellowships including the following:

- Gene S. Stuart Award, Society for American Archeology, 2022
- Architectural Journalism Award, American Institute of Architects, Baltimore Chapter, 2022
- National Endowment for the Arts Creative Writing Fellowship, 2018
- Mary Sawyers Baker Prize in the Literary Arts, 2017
- Hrushka Memorial Nonfiction Prize, 2015
- Roger D. Redden Award, Baltimore Architecture Foundation, 2011

== Selected publications ==
- Claire McCardell: The Designer Who Set Women Free. Simon & Schuster, 2025. ISBN 978-1668045237
- “The Endless Robbing of Native American Graves,” The Washington Post Magazine, 2021
- “After the Cure,” The Washington Post Magazine, 2020
- “The Case of the Stolen Ruby Slippers,” The Washington Post Magazine, 2019
- “A Dress for Everyone,” The Washington Post Magazine, 2018
- “The Woman Who Invented Forensic Training with Dollhouses,” The New Yorker.com, 2017
- “On Nostalgia,” Passages North, 2015
- “Notes from a Suicide,” Post Road, 2015
- “A Modern Girl’s Guide to Childbirth.” PANK, 2014
- “Danish Modern,” Little Patuxent Review, 2013
