= Dumbarton Middle School =

- 300 Dumbarton Road; Towson, Maryland 21212; United States

Information
- Type: Public
- School district: Baltimore County Public Schools
- Principal: Amanda Shanks
- Grades: 6–8
- Enrollment: 1,225
- Colors: Maroon and gray
- Mascot: Lion
- Website: dumbartonms.bcps.org

Dumbarton Middle School is a school located at 300 Dumbarton Road in the Rodgers Forge neighborhood of Towson, Maryland, United States, just outside Baltimore. It is part of the Baltimore County Public Schools system.

Dumbarton currently has more than 1,000 students attending. Students come to Dumbarton from several different elementary schools in Baltimore County, but the majority come from Rodgers Forge Elementary School, located next door to Dumbarton and also a blue ribbon school; Stoneleigh Elementary; Lutherville Laboratory Elementary; Hampton Elementary; West Towson Elementary; and Riderwood Elementary. Students from Dumbarton go on to Towson High School, another Blue Ribbon School.

== Academics ==
Opened in 1956, the school was awarded the status of Blue Ribbon school in 1998.

It offers Spanish, French, and Latin. Dumbarton also has one of the largest ESOL programs in the Baltimore County Public School system, with close to 15% of the school population not having English as a first language. The school has extramural programs/clubs. The school has 44 teachers, 51 classrooms, a cafeteria, library, and gymnasium, with other classes, such as Music, Health, P.E., Art, and Tech.

== Notable alumni ==
- James Morris, bass-baritone opera singer
- Michael Phelps, most awarded Olympic athlete
