= Attending Physician of the United States Congress =

Government medical officer

Physician of Congress
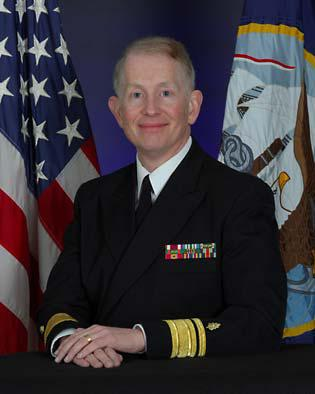
- Incumbent; Brian Monahan since January 2009
- Office of Attending Physician
- Appointer: The president
- Inaugural holder: George Calver
- Formation: 1928

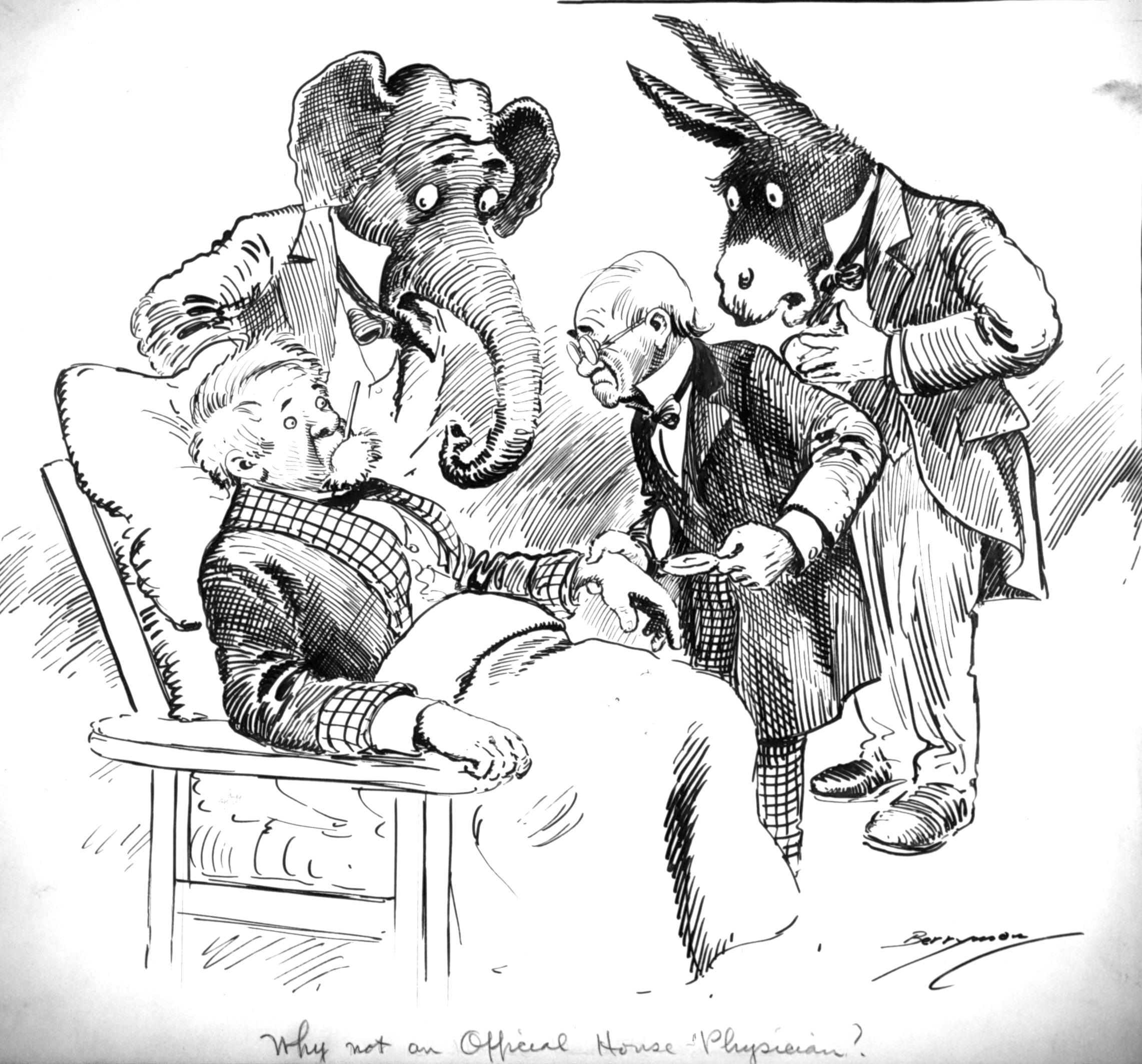
1917 illustration entitled, "Why Not an Official House Physician?", by Clifford Berryman

The attending physician of the United States Congress is the physician responsible for the medical welfare of the members of the United States Congress and the justices of the Supreme Court of the United States.

The attending physician is tasked with emergency care for staff, security personnel and dignitaries, and implementation of the environmental health, public health, and occupational health programs of the Capitol Hill region. The attending physician is involved in security planning and works with the architect of the Capitol, Senate sergeant at arms, House sergeant at arms, and the United States Capitol Police.

== History ==
The Office of Attending Physician (OAP) was established by congressional resolution in 1928 to meet the medical needs of members of Congress. The OAP began serving the medical needs of the U.S. House of Representatives in 1929 and the following year, in 1930, began serving the U.S. Senate. The first attending physician, Dr. George Calver, served the Congress for approximately 37 years. The current attending physician of the United States Congress is Dr. Brian Monahan. He holds the rank of rear admiral in the United States Navy. Dr. Monahan was appointed to the position by President Barack Obama in January 2009.

The Office of the Attending Physician, under the leadership of Dr. John Francis Eisold, played a central role in the response to the 2001 anthrax attacks on Senator Tom Daschle's Senate office, taking nasal swabs from the nearly 6,000 staff, employees, and visitors that were potentially exposed to the harmful bacteria. Former attending physician Rear Admiral Dr. John Eisold and his staff also provided initial treatment to Senator Tim Johnson when he suffered from an intracerebral bleed caused by a cerebral arteriovenous malformation, prior to Johnson's admission to George Washington University Hospital.

== Routine care ==
OAP provides members of Congress with physicals and routine examinations, on-site X-rays and lab work, physical therapy and referrals to medical specialists from military hospitals and private medical practices. When specialists are needed, they are brought to the Capitol, often at no charge to members of Congress.

Members of Congress do not pay for the individual services they receive at the OAP, nor do they submit claims through their federal employee health insurance policies. Instead, as of 2009, members paid a flat, annual fee of $503 for all the care they receive. As of February 2025, the cost had increased to $650 - or $54/month. The rest of the cost of their care is paid for by federal funding, from the U.S. Navy budget. The annual fee has not changed significantly since 1992.

== List of attending physicians ==
Years	Attending physician
1928–1966	George Calver
1966–1973	Rufus Pearson
1973–1986	Freeman Cary
1986–1990	William Narva
1990–1994	Robert C.J. Krasner
1994–2009	John Francis Eisold
2009–present	Brian Monahan

== Sources ==
- United States Senate Historical Minute Essay: A Doctor's Warning, February 3, 1951
- United States House of Representatives Weekly Historical Highlights: October 11, 1966
