= Towson High School =

Towson High School Towson Law & Public Policy High School

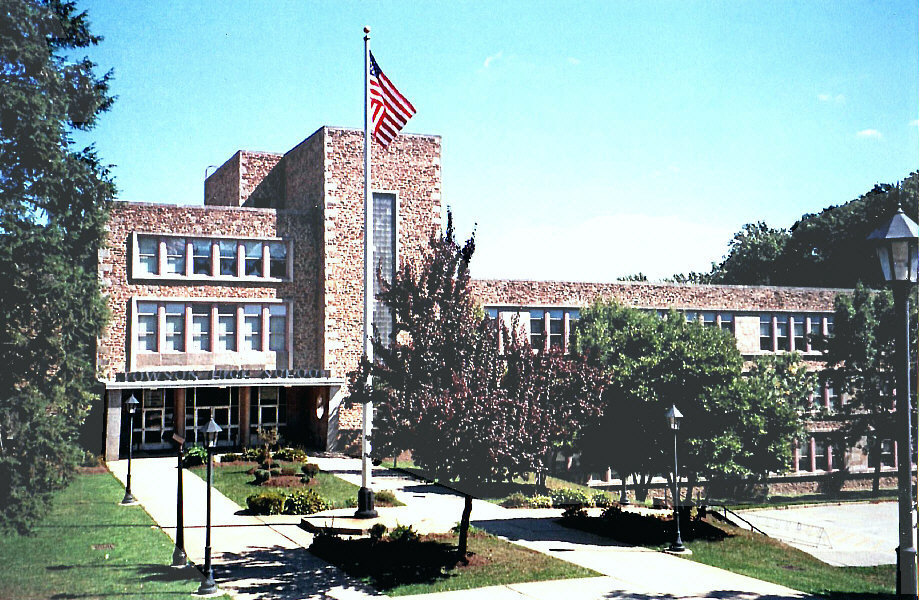

Location
- Towson, Maryland; United States; 39°23′27″N 76°36′01″W

Information
- Type: Public Secondary
- Motto: A Tradition of Excellence
- Established: 1873
- School district: Baltimore County Public Schools
- Superintendent: Dr. William Heiser
- Principal: Lawrence "Bo" Du Val
- Grades: 9-12
- Enrollment: 1,442 (2008)
- Campus: Suburban
- Colors: Maroon and white
- Song: "Amici"
- Mascot: Generals
- Newspaper: The Talisman
- Yearbook: Sidelights
- National ranking: 341st
- Literary Magazine: Colophon
- Website: towsonhs.bcps.org

Towson High School is a high school in Baltimore County, Maryland, United States, founded in 1873. The school's current stone structure was built in 1949. Located in the northern Baltimore suburb of Towson and serving the surrounding communities of Towson, Lutherville, and Ruxton, it is part of the Baltimore County Public Schools system, the 25th largest school system in the nation as of 2005. Area middle schools that feed into Towson High are Dumbarton Middle School, Ridgely Middle School, and Loch Raven Technical Academy, although students from other areas attend the Law and Public Policy magnet school.

== Academics ==
Towson High school received a 63.8 out of a possible 90 points (70%) on the 2018-2019 Maryland State Department of Education Report Card and received a 4 out of 5 star rating, ranking in the 74th percentile among all Maryland schools.

The school has risen steadily in Newsweek's annual nationwide high school survey during the five-year period culminating in its No. 246 ranking in 2008, having previously placed No. 292 in 2007, No. 317 in 2006, No. 452 in 2005, and No. 511 in 2003. Following publication of the magazine's survey in May 2008, Towson High's then-principal Jane Barranger, said: "I'm very proud of our parents and our kids and our teachers. It takes all of their efforts to make sure that students are prepared to take challenging tests." Barranger retired in June, 2013, after 12 years as the school's principal, succeeded by Charlene DiMino. In its 2019 survey of STEM programs, Newsweek ranked Towson #310 among US high schools.. The current principal is Lawrence "Bo" Du Val (since the 2026-2027 school year).

== Magnet Program ==
Law and Public Policy

The Law and Public Policy magnet requires seven total law credits, which can be obtained within the span of four years by approved courses. In the 9th grade, students take AP American Government and Politics and Introduction to Law. In 10th grade, students take a Trial Advocacy and Criminal Law course in a classroom that replicates a courtroom, complete with witness box, jury box, defense/prosecution tables, etc. In the next two years, students can choose from a variety of electives, including Latin, forensic science, philosophy, international law, AP Government, and other law-related courses to fulfill the remaining law credits required for graduation in accordance with the Law and Public Policy magnet.

== Students ==
The 2020-2021 enrollment at Towson High School was 1677 students. One-fifth of its students are Black, 8.5 percent are Asian American and 6.6 percent are Hispanic. On average Towson students score above the rest of the county and state on standardized tests.

== History ==
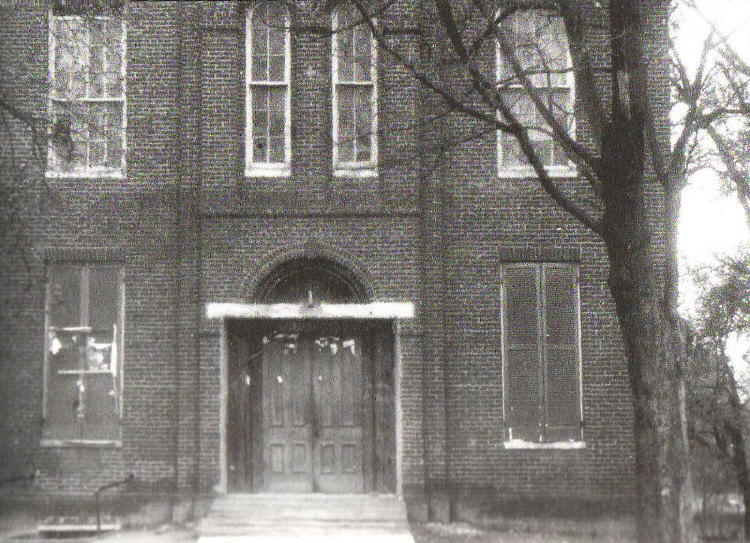
The original school on Chesapeake Avenue, built in 1873.

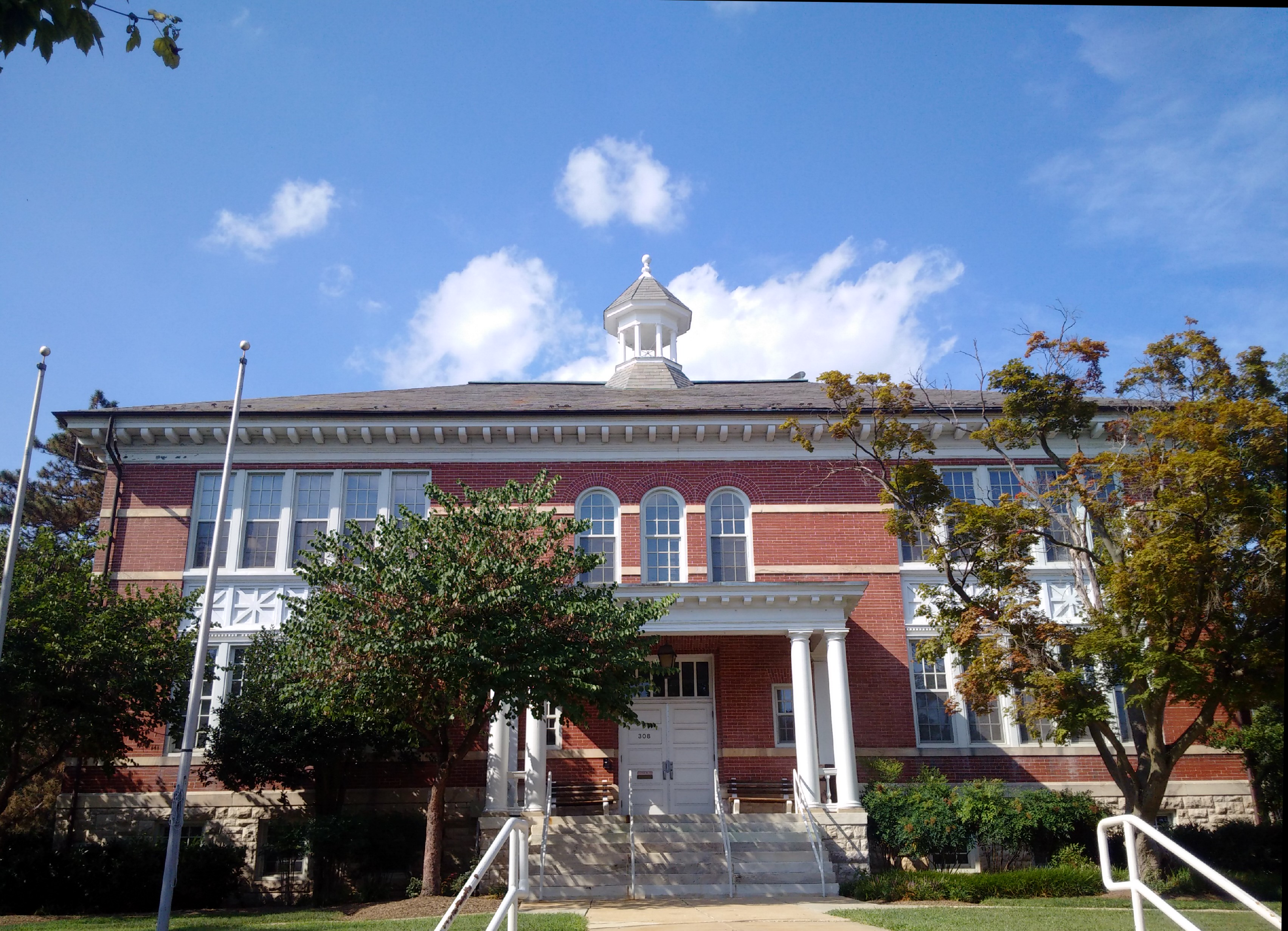
Allegheny Avenue location (1906–1925)

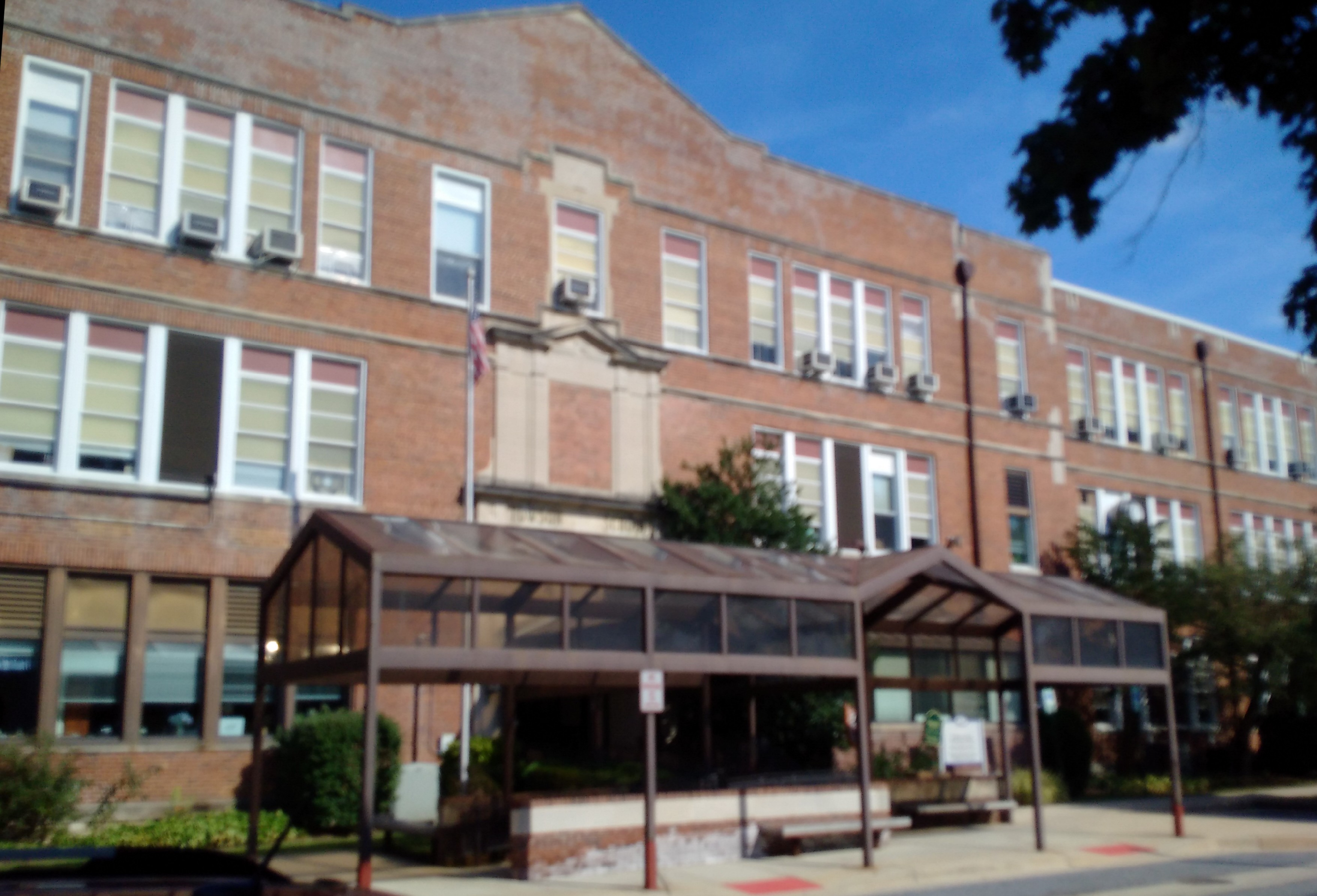
Central Avenue location (1925–1949)

Towson High School was originally located on East Chesapeake Avenue, in a small brick structure built in 1873. When it burned down in 1906, a replacement was built on Allegheny Avenue. In 1925, the high school moved to a larger 3-story brick structure at an adjacent site on Central Avenue and the vacated building was converted into an elementary school. This old Allegheny Avenue building still stands today, now used for County offices.

Construction of Towson High School's present-day campus on the grounds of the old Aigburth Vale estate began in the late 1940s, as the Towson area's population surged upward following World War II. The Aigburth Vale house, still standing near the school's athletic field, was added to the National Register of Historic Places in 1999.

When the current campus at Cedar and Aigburth Avenues opened as Towson Senior High School in 1949, the former Central Avenue building became a Junior High School for grades 7 and 8 and, later, Towson Elementary School. It is now a senior citizen center.

Towson High's current campus underwent a renovation from 1996 to 1999. Classrooms were rebuilt to be smaller, air conditioning was retrofitted, and all exterior doors and windows were replaced.

With the end of racial segregation in Baltimore County public schools in 1954, the African-American student body of the old Carver High School on York Road (now the George Washington Carver Center for Arts and Technology magnet school) was merged with Towson High School.

== Structure ==
The present 5-level stone structure completed in 1949 includes a large auditorium with theater-style seating, a gymnasium, and a cafeteria. Classrooms are on the lower three floors. The fourth floor was originally used for administrative offices, then became an art studio, and currently contains two classrooms and a computer lab. The fifth floor of the school can not be used for classes as it would not comply with fire codes for proper evacuation. It is used to store books, and is occasionally used as an office. In the early 1960s, the fifth floor was also used by a student-operated ham radio station.

The library and science wing were added in the mid-1960s and the entire school underwent extensive upgrading in the late 1990s, including the installation of modern heating and air conditioning. In 2006, the historic stone structure was designated a Landmark by the Baltimore County Landmarks Preservation Commission.

The school exceeded its state-rated capacity of 1,260 pupils in 2007, according to enrollment figures. By 2018, the school exceeded design capacity by approximately 300 students, using portable structures to accommodate the overflow. Various solutions to the overcrowding problem, including the possibility of one or more new schools, have been proposed. The Baltimore County Board of Education included funding for replacement buildings for Towson and Dulaney High School in its overall capital budget request of $216 million for Fiscal Year 2020, renewing the request in its FY2021 budget submittal to the state of Maryland for appropriation.

== Athletics ==
The "Generals" have won the following Maryland state championships:

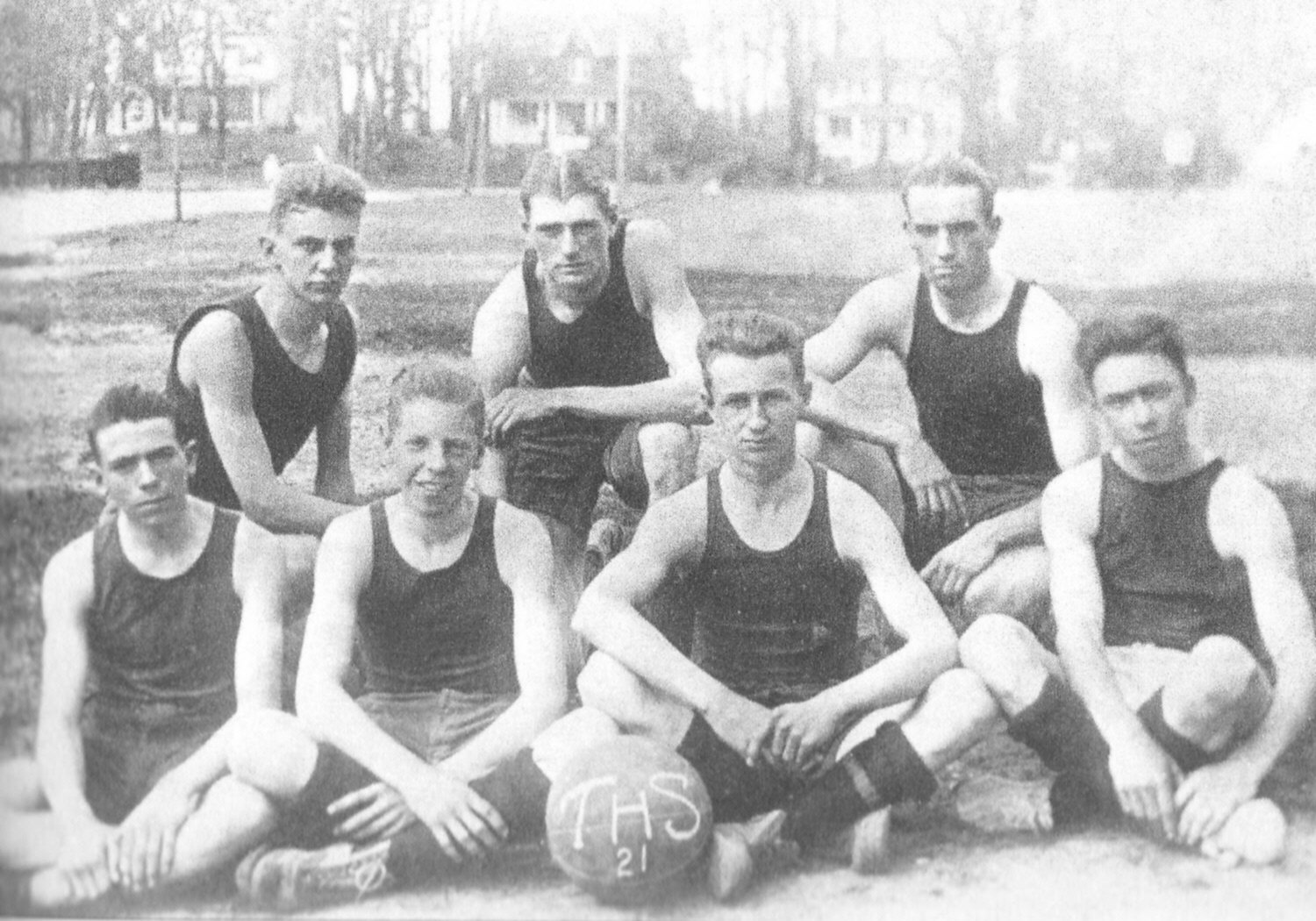
Boys' basketball team, 1921

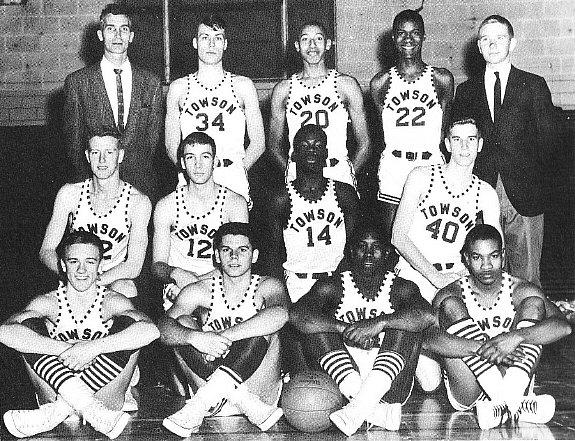
State Championship basketball team, 1963

SPORT	YEAR
Boys' Baseball	2000
Boys' Basketball	1963
Boys' Lacrosse	1988, 1989, 1992; 1993, 1994, 1997
Boys' Soccer	1972, 1986•, 1991• 2003•, 2005•
Boys' Track and Field	1953
Boys' Cross Country	1952, 1953, 1955, 1974, 1987, 2022, 2023
Girls' Cross Country	1980, 1982, 1984; 2001, 2008, 2022
Girls' Lacrosse	1997
Girls' Basketball	1998
Mixed-Varsity Badminton	2006, 2007, 2008, 2009, 2010, 2013 (County Championships - no State Tournament contested)
Girls' Volleyball	2001, 2010
• = denotes co-champions Source: MPSSAA Official Tournament Records

Michael Phelps, as a 15-year-old student at Towson High School, competed in the 2000 Olympics, the youngest American male swimmer to do so, and in 2001 he became the youngest man ever to set a world record in swimming.

== Notable alumni ==
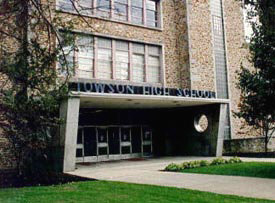
Cedar Avenue entrance

The school's alumni association, founded in 1907, says it is "one of the oldest, continuous, public school alumni associations in the U.S.". Well-known alumni include:

- Harry Streett Baldwin (1912) - politician
- Raymond Ward Bissell - art historian and Professor of Art History at the University of Michigan
- Ting Cui – (2020) - figure skater
- Elizabeth Evitts Dickinson — writer
- Jean Marie Donnell (1938) - movie and TV actress
- John F. Eisold (1964) - U.S. Navy rear admiral and attending physician of the United States Congress
- Evan Farmer - actor / TV personality
- Joyce Hens Green - Federal judge
- Billy Jones – first black basketball player in the ACC
- Andy Karl – singer/actor in seven Broadway shows
- James M. Kelly – special assistant to President Bush, formerly a Maryland House Delegate
- Harris Glenn Milstead (1963) – drag queen, actor and singer better known as 'Divine'
- Ellen O. Moyer – politician
- Lowell Blair Nesbitt (1951) – painter
- Ken Ono – mathematician and film producer
- Santa J. Ono – immunologist and President University of Michigan, President, University of British Columbia, Past President University of Cincinnati
- Michael Phelps (2003) – 28-time Olympic medalist and swimming world record holder
- Mary Watters Risteau (1907) – first woman elected to the Maryland House of Delegates, first woman elected to the Maryland Senate
- William Rush (did not graduate) – member of the Maryland House of Delegates
- Ellen Sauerbrey (1955) – politician
- Dan Szymborski (1996) – sports statistician
- Jack Thomas (1970) - All-American Lacrosse Player
- Derek Waters (1998) - actor, comedian, writer and creator of Drunk History
