= Brian P. Monahan =

American physician (born 1960)

Brian Patrick Monahan
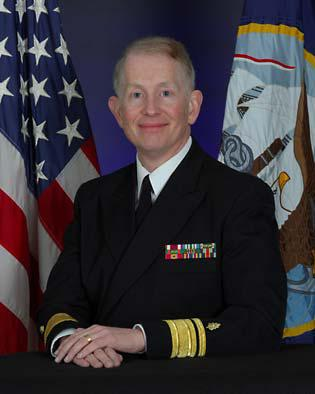
- Attending Physician of the United States Congress
- Born: 1960 (age 65–66); Fairfield, Connecticut, U.S.
- Military career
- Allegiance: United States of America
- Branch: United States Navy
- Service years: 1986–present
- Rank: Rear Admiral
- Commands: Attending Physician of the United States Congress

Brian Patrick Monahan (born 1960) was the Attending Physician of the United States Congress and the United States Supreme Court and holds the rank of rear admiral in the United States Navy. United States President Barack Obama nominated Monahan to the position and rank in January 2009. He previously served as the director of hematology and medical oncology at the National Naval Medical Center. He is a Master of The American College of Physicians and a Member of the Academy of Medicine.

Monahan is an internal medicine and hematology and medical oncology (HMO) doctor and researcher, and from 1987 to 1989 Monahan served as the battalion surgeon for the 3rd Battalion 6th Marine Regiment of the 2nd Marine Division prior to his training in internal medicine at the National Naval Medical Center. He served as professor and chairman of medicine at The Uniformed Services University of the Health Sciences in Bethesda, Maryland, prior to his present assignment. He returned permanently in the spring of 2008 as the assistant attending physician.

In May 2003, Monahan was presented with the 18th Annual Clinical Investigation Program Award for his project entitled, A Pilot Study of Oxaliplatin and Capecitibine in Adult Patients with Refractory Solid Tumors. The three-year project tested the effectiveness of an anti-cancer drug on 100 patients with colon cancer. With the National Cancer Institute, Monahan served as the principal investigator on clinical trials of novel anti-cancer drugs and discovered the unexpected sudden death associated with the first non-sedating antihistamines like Seldane.( JAMA. 1990;264(21):2788-2790) Monahan was Navy specialty leader for hematology and medical oncology from 2001 to 2008, chairman of the U. S. Military Cancer Institute Medical Oncology Program and associate director for federal compliance and human subjects protections from 2002 to 2008. His work with the American Society of Clinical Oncology helped create the first national in-training competency examination in medical oncology in 2008.

Monahan is also a medical educator at the Uniformed Services University Department of Medicine, where he has been selected Outstanding Teacher of the Year multiple times. He became assistant professor of medicine at USU in 1991 and was promoted to associate professor in 1999 and professor of medicine and pathology in 2006. He was named the Outstanding Teacher of the Year of The National Cancer Institute in 2000.

Monahan was praised for his approach to advising members of Congress about COVID-19.

He resigned from his poisition in November 2026 amidst allegations of misconduct. An investigation is ongoing.

== Education ==
Monahan received his B.S. summa cum laude from Fairfield University and M.D. magna cum laude from the Georgetown University School of Medicine. He trained in internal medicine and later hematology and medical oncology (HMO) at National Naval Medical Center (NNMC). He is certified by the American Board of Internal Medicine in internal medicine, hematology, and medical oncology.
