= Maryland Route 607 =

Highway in Maryland

Maryland Route 607
- Maryland Route 607 highlighted in red

Route information
- Maintained by MDSHA
- Length: 1.54 mi (2.48 km)
- Existed: 1936–present

Major junctions
- South end: Woods Road near Jacobsville
- MD 100 in Jacobsville; MD 177 in Jacobsville
- North end: MD 173 in Jacobsville

Location
- Country: United States
- State: Maryland
- Counties: Anne Arundel

Highway system
- Maryland highway system; Interstate; US; State; Scenic Byways
← I-595	→ MD 610

Maryland Route 607 (MD 607) is a state highway in the U.S. state of Maryland. The state highway runs 1.54 miles (2.48 km) from Woods Road south of MD 100 north to MD 173 in Jacobsville in Anne Arundel County. MD 607 was constructed from MD 177 to MD 173 in the mid-1930s and extended to its present southern terminus in the early 1970s.

== Route description ==
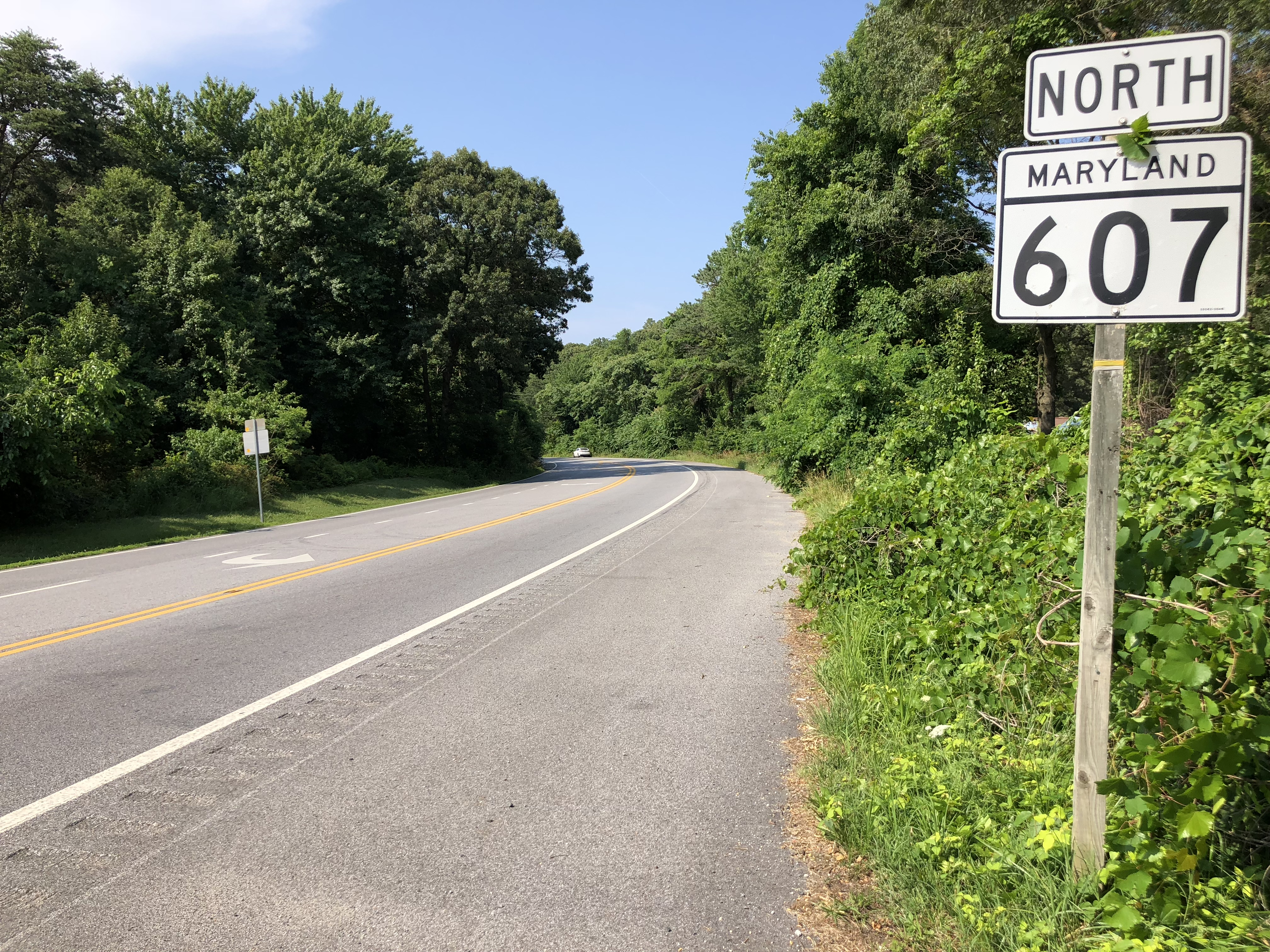
View north from the south end of MD 607 at Woods Road near Jacobsville

MD 607 begins as Magothy Bridge Road at an intersection with Woods Road and Seaborne Drive near Jacobsville. Magothy Bridge Road continues south and west as a county highway toward a crossing of the Magothy River and on to Pasadena. MD 607 heads north as a two-lane undivided road and temporarily becomes a divided highway around its intersection with MD 100 (Paul T. Pitcher Memorial Highway). The state highway continues north to the center of Jacobsville, where the road meets MD 177 (Mountain Road). MD 607 continues north as Hog Neck Road to its northern terminus at MD 173 (Fort Smallwood Road).

MD 607 is a part of the National Highway System as a principal arterial from MD 100 to MD 173 in Jacobsville.

== History ==
MD 607 was constructed from MD 177 to MD 173 in 1936. The highway was extended south to its present terminus in 1970, shortly before the completion of MD 100 from MD 2 in Pasadena to MD 177 east of Jacobsville.

== Junction list ==
The entire route is in Jacobsville, Anne Arundel County.

mi	km	Destinations	Notes
0.00	0.00	Magothy Bridge Road west / Woods Road east / Seaborne Drive north	Southern terminus
0.44	0.71	MD 100 (Paul T. Pitcher Memorial Highway) – Gibson Island, Glen Burnie	
0.78	1.26	MD 177 (Mountain Road) – Gibson Island, Pasadena	
1.54	2.48	MD 173 (Fort Smallwood Road) – Riviera Beach, Fort Smallwood	Northern terminus
1.000 mi = 1.609 km; 1.000 km = 0.621 mi
