= Maryland Route 100 =

State highway in Maryland, United States

Maryland Route 100
- Paul T. Pitcher Memorial Highway
- Maryland Route 100 highlighted in red

Route information
- Maintained by MDSHA
- Length: 22.38 mi (36.02 km)
- Existed: 1970–present

Major junctions
- West end: US 29 in Ellicott City
- MD 104 / MD 108 in Ellicott City; MD 103 in Elkridge; I-95 in Elkridge; US 1 in Elkridge; MD 295 in Hanover; MD 713 in Hanover; MD 170 in Severn; I-97 in Glen Burnie; MD 2 in Pasadena; MD 10 in Pasadena
- East end: MD 177 in Pasadena

Location
- Country: United States
- State: Maryland
- Counties: Howard, Anne Arundel

Highway system
- Maryland highway system; Interstate; US; State; Scenic Byways
← MD 99	→ MD 103

Maryland Route 100 (MD 100) is a major east–west highway connecting U.S. Route 29 (US 29) in Ellicott City (just north of Columbia) and MD 177 (Mountain Road) in Pasadena. MD 100 also connects to Interstate 95 (I-95), US 1, the Baltimore–Washington Parkway (MD 295), and I-97. The highway connects Howard County to the west with Anne Arundel County and the Chesapeake Bay to the east. MD 100 also provides access to the Baltimore–Washington International Airport (BWI) and the Arundel Mills shopping mall.

The eastern section of MD 100 in Anne Arundel County is known as the Paul T. Pitcher Memorial Highway. The name comes in dedication to Paul T. Pitcher, an Anne Arundel County executive, who originally conceived the highway.

== Route description ==
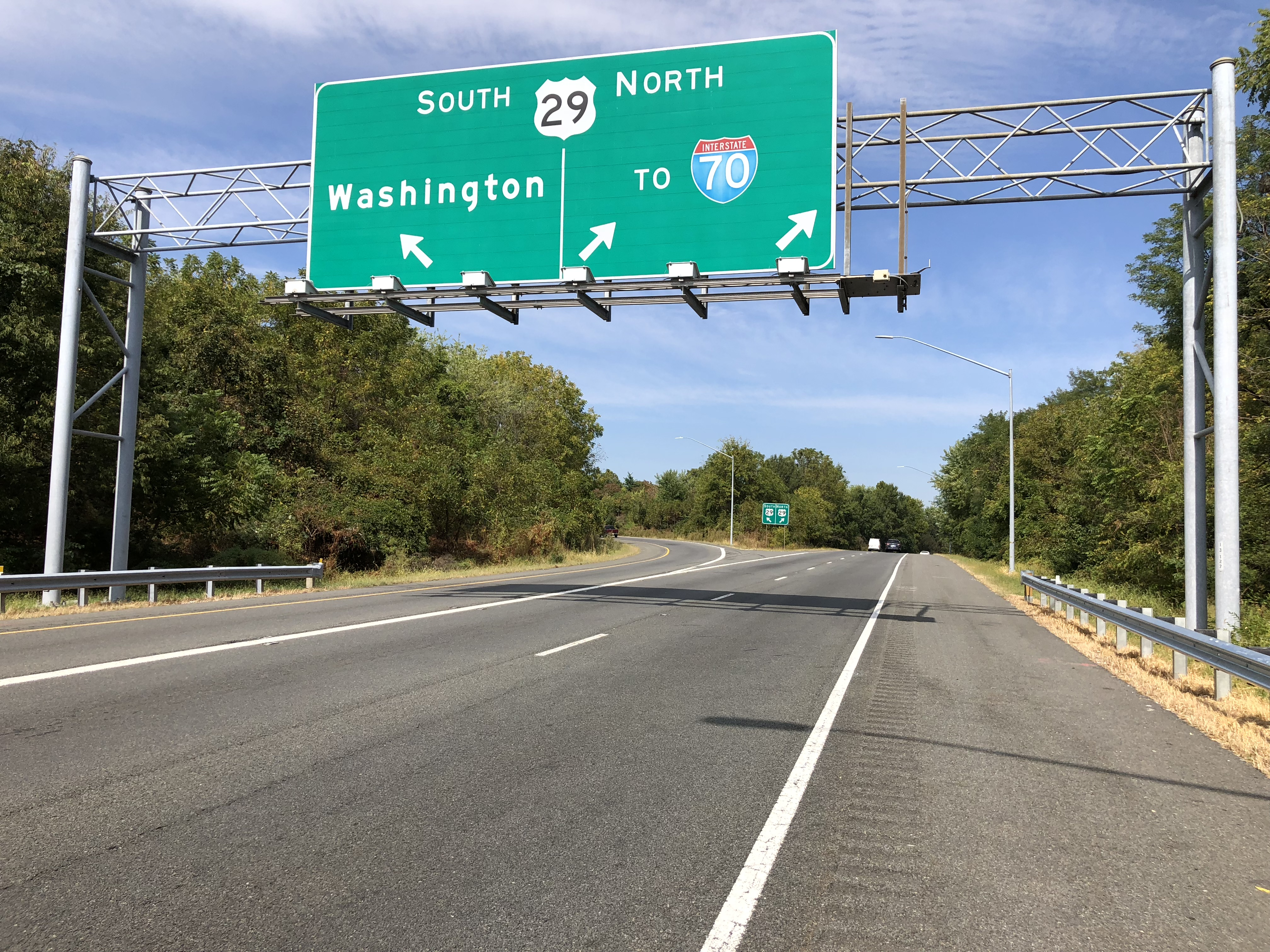
Western terminus of MD 100 at US 29 in Ellicott City

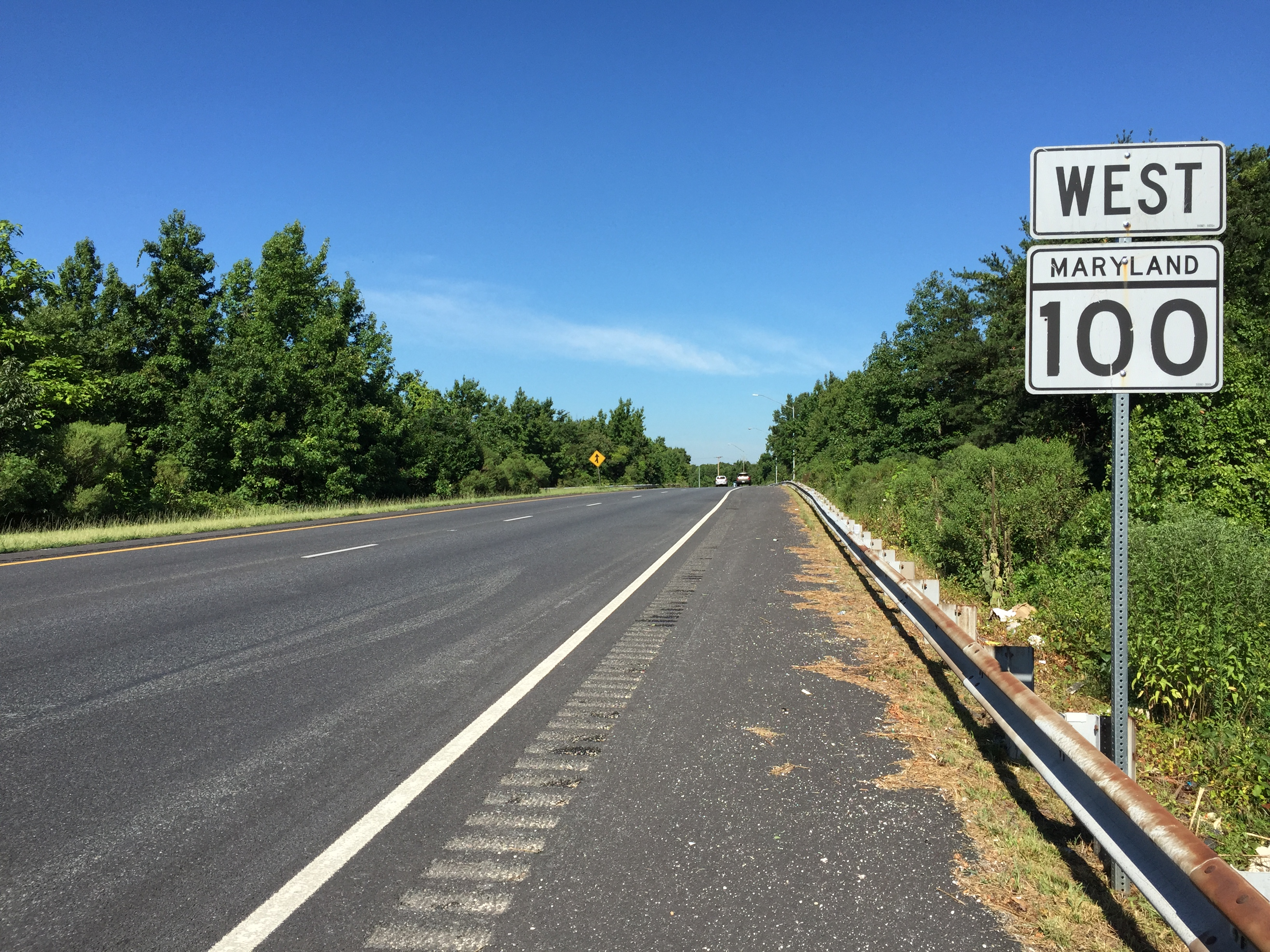
View west along MD 100 between MD 10 and MD 2 in Pasadena

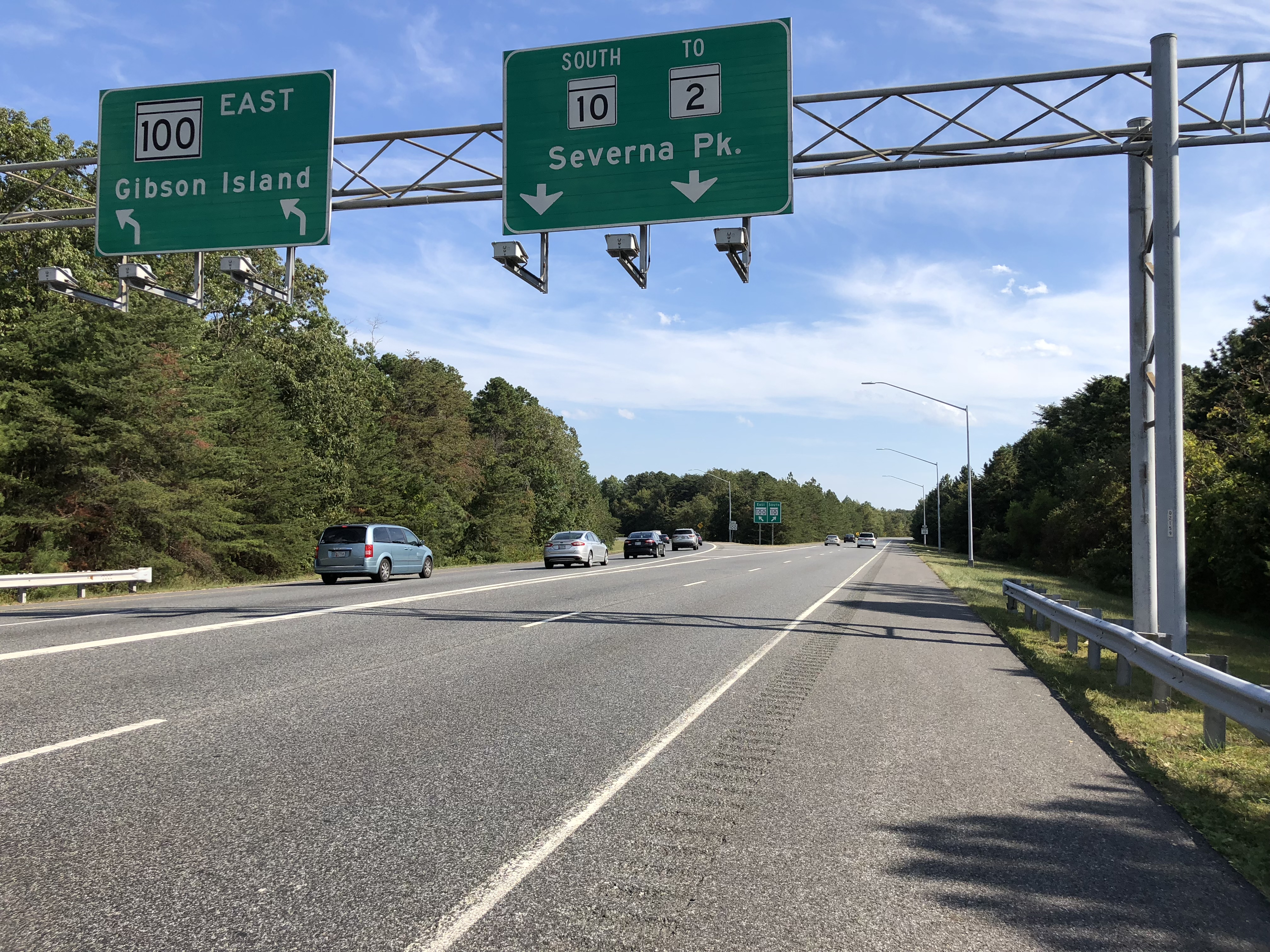
MD 100 eastbound at split with MD 10 in Pasadena

The route begins as a six-lane divided freeway at US 29 near Ellicott City. There are then interchanges with MD 108, MD 104, Snowden River Parkway and MD 103.

At the junction with I-95, the road narrows to four lanes. Then MD 100 intersects with US 1 followed by an exit for the Dorsey station along MARC's Camden Line. It then crosses the Baltimore-Washington Parkway.

MD 100 then intersects with MD 170 (Telegraph Road) where the road becomes 6 lanes. Then the road junctions with Interstate 97 near Hanover and reduces down to 4 lanes before crossing MD 2. Between Glen Burnie and Jacobsville, MD 100 serves as a bypass for MD 177, and has interchanges with MD 10 and MD 607.

The road ends by merging back into MD 177.

== History ==
Maryland Route 100 began in the 1970s as two separate roads, both having the MD 100 designation. The first was known as the Mountain Road Extension, stretching between Governor Ritchie Highway and the old Maryland Route 3, now Interstate 97. The second was built as a short spur between the newly constructed Interstate 95 and US 1 in Elkridge. The eastern section, originally known as the Mountain Road Bypass, was constructed east of Ritchie Highway in the late 1970s. MD 100 was completed west of I-97 to I-95, thereby connecting the two roads, in 1994, but it was not completed in its entirety to US 29 until November 1998. A portion of the route between Exit 1B-C and Exit 2 was constructed earlier than the rest as an at-grade boulevard, on the right-of-way of the future eastbound lanes; this section was eventually upgraded.

The construction of the route near Lake Waterford Road severed the original road between Baltimore and Annapolis: the Baltimore-Annapolis Boulevard, signed in part as MD 648. The physical road ends at a pair of dead ends on either side of the right-of-way; MD 648 follows Lake Waterford Road between Baltimore-Annapolis Boulevard and MD 177 before rejoining its original path.

The route was to be part of the Baltimore Outer Beltway, a proposed freeway that would have encircled parts of the Greater Baltimore area and provide a route parallel to the Baltimore Beltway. MD 100 represents the major portion that was built; US 29 between MD 100's terminus and US 29's own northern terminus at Maryland Route 99, four miles (6 km) in length, is another portion. The Outer Beltway was projected beyond MD 99 to run through Howard and Baltimore Counties and intersect MD 140, Interstate 83, US 1, and Interstate 95 before terminating at US 40 northeast of Baltimore.

== Exit list ==
County	Location	mi	km	Exit	Destinations	Notes
Howard	Ellicott City	0.00	0.00		US 29 (Columbia Pike) to I-70 – Washington	Western terminus; US 29 Exit 22
Howard	Ellicott City	0.68	1.09	1A	Long Gate Parkway	Unsigned MD 100J; no westbound entrance
Howard	Ellicott City	1.54	2.48	1B	Executive Park Drive	Unsigned MD 100V; no eastbound entrance; signed as exits 1B and 1C westbound
Howard	Ellicott City	1.99	3.20	1C	Centre Park Drive	Right-in/right-out interchange eastbound
Howard	Ellicott City	2.45	3.94	2	MD 104 (Waterloo Road) / MD 108 (Old Annapolis Road)	
Howard	Columbia	3.65	5.87	3	Snowden River Parkway	Unsigned MD 100W
Howard	Elkridge	4.51	7.26	4	MD 103 (Meadowridge Road)	
Howard	Elkridge	5.68	9.14	5	I-95 – Baltimore, Washington	I-95 Exit 43; split into exits 5A (south) and 5B (north)
Howard	Elkridge	6.47	10.41	6	US 1 (Washington Boulevard) – Laurel, Elkridge	Split into exits 6A (south) and 6B (north) eastbound
Howard	Dorsey	7.12	11.46	7	Dorsey MARC Station	Access road is unsigned MD 100L
Anne Arundel	Hanover	7.69	12.38	8	Coca-Cola Drive	Unsigned MD 100M
Anne Arundel	Hanover	8.39	13.50	9	MD 295 (Baltimore–Washington Parkway) – Baltimore, Washington	Split into exits 9A (south) and 9B (north)
Anne Arundel	Hanover	9.43	15.18	10	MD 713 (Arundel Mills Boulevard) – Hanover, Stoney Run District	Split into exits 10A (south) and 10B (north) eastbound
Anne Arundel	Severn	11.43	18.39	11	MD 170 (Telegraph Road) – Linthicum, Odenton	Single-point urban interchange
Anne Arundel	Glen Burnie	13.94	22.43	13	I-97 – Baltimore, Annapolis	I-97 Exit 14; split into exits 13A (south) and 13B (north)
Anne Arundel	Glen Burnie	14.53	23.38	14	MD 174 (Quarterfield Road)	Westbound exit, eastbound entrance
Anne Arundel	Glen Burnie	15.89	25.57	15	Oakwood Road	
Anne Arundel	Pasadena	17.10	27.52	16	MD 2 (Ritchie Highway) / MD 177 (Mountain Road) to MD 10 north – Pasadena, Glen Burnie	Split into exits 16A (south) and 16B (north); westbound exit 16B leads to MD 177
Anne Arundel	Pasadena	17.69	28.47		MD 10 north (Arundel Expressway) to I-695 – Baltimore	Westbound exit, eastbound entrance; west end of concurrency with MD 10
Anne Arundel	Pasadena	18.43	29.66		MD 10 south (Arundel Expressway) to MD 2 – Severna Park	Eastbound exit, westbound entrance; east end of concurrency with MD 10
Anne Arundel	Pasadena	20.12	32.38	19	Catherine Avenue	Eastbound exit, westbound entrance
Anne Arundel	Pasadena	20.96	33.73	20	Edwin Raynor Boulevard to MD 173	Eastbound exit, westbound entrance
Anne Arundel	Jacobsville	21.50	34.60		MD 607 (Magothy Bridge Road)	At-grade signalized intersection
Anne Arundel	Jacobsville	21.80	35.08		Magothy Beach Road	At-grade signalized intersection
Anne Arundel	Jacobsville	22.38	36.02		MD 177 east (Mountain Road) – Gibson Island	Eastern terminus; no access from eastbound MD 100 to westbound MD 177
1.000 mi = 1.609 km; 1.000 km = 0.621 mi: Concurrency terminus; Incomplete access

== Auxiliary routes ==
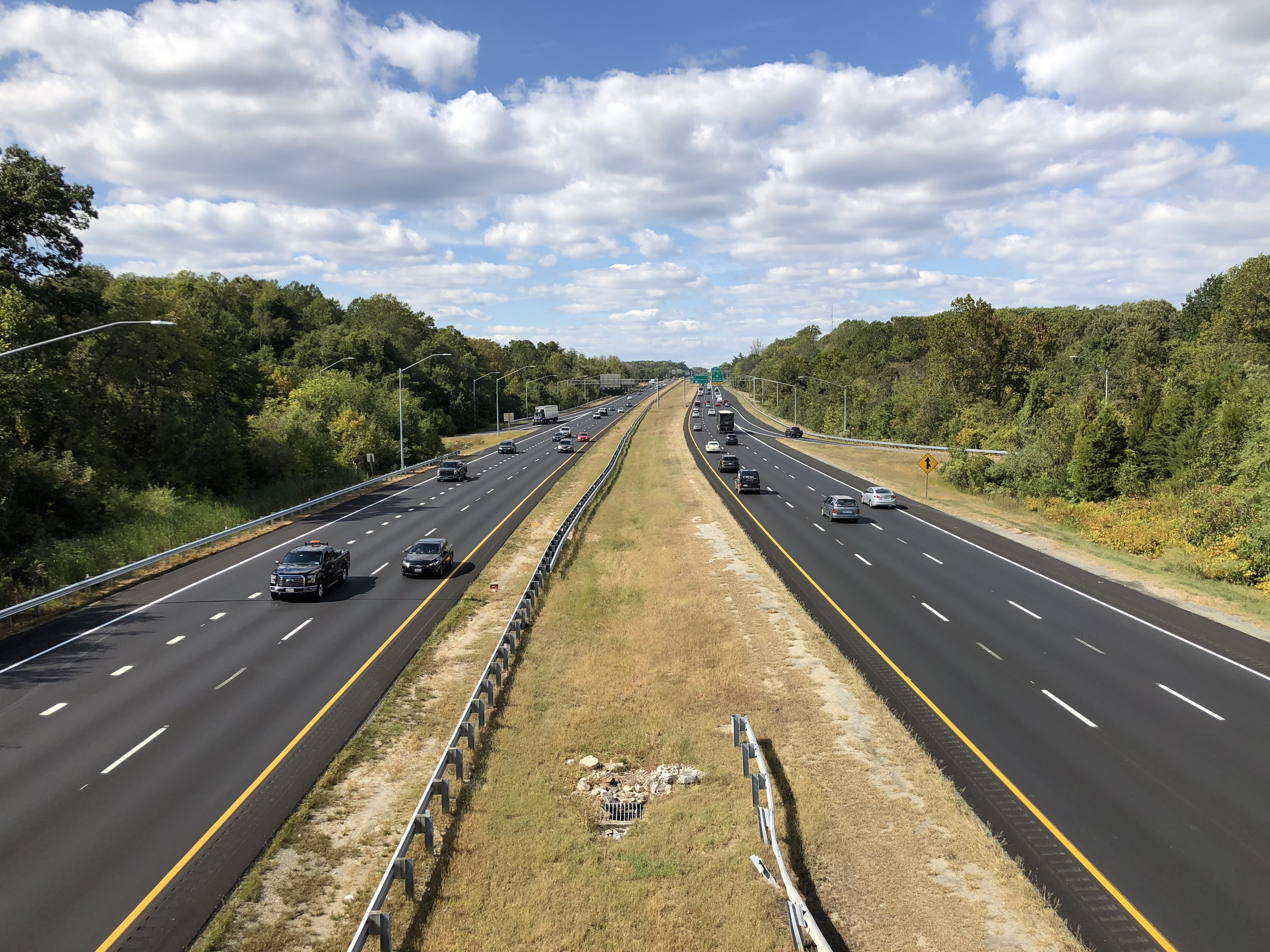
MD 100 westbound at US 1 in Elkridge

MD 100 has fourteen auxiliary routes: five in Howard County, eight in Anne Arundel County, and one in both counties.

- MD 100-J is a 0.24-mile-long (0.39 km) segment of Long Gate Parkway from Meadowbrook Lane and a park and ride exit through MD 100's exit 1A to the end of state maintenance where the road continues as Long Gate Parkway. It is located in Ellicott City, Howard County.
- MD 100-L is the designation for a 0.06-mile-long (97 m) section of the access road from the Dorsey MARC station to MD 100 at exit 7 in Dorsey, Howard County.
- MD 100-M is the designation for a 0.49-mile-long (0.79 km) segment of Coca-Cola Drive from MD 103 to Park Circle Drive in both Howard and Anne Arundel Counties. The route has an interchange with MD 100 at its exit 8.
- MD 100-N is a 0.20-mile-long (0.32 km) state-maintained segment of Wright Road in Hanover, Anne Arundel County. The road was realigned as a result of the construction of MD 100's exit 9.
- MD 100-O is a 0.04-mile-long (64 m) segment of old Wright Road in Hanover, Anne Arundel County. The route runs from MD 100-N to a point just before Old Wright Road dead ends.
- MD 100-P is a state-maintained section of Harmans Road over MD 100 in Harmans, Anne Arundel County. It is 0.26 miles (0.42 km) long.
- MD 100-Q is a 0.26-mile-long (0.42 km) section of Queenstown Road over MD 100 in Severn, Anne Arundel County.
- MD 100-R consists of a 0.27-mile-long (0.43 km) segment of WB&A Road over MD 100 in Severn, Anne Arundel County.
- MD 100-S is a 0.16-mile-long (0.26 km) section of Wieker Road from MD 170 (near MD 100's exit 11) to an intersection with Wieker Road and South Wiker Road in Severn, Anne Arundel County.
- MD 100-T is a 0.60-mile-long (0.97 km) paved and state-maintained section of Sandy Farm Road in Severn, Anne Arundel County. The route begins at an intersection with MD 100-S and travels north, adjacent to MD 170 and the ramps of MD 100 exit 11. It ends at the transition from a narrow paved road to a dirt road.
- MD 100-U is the easternmost segment of Otis Drive in Severn, Anne Arundel County. The route is 0.15 miles (0.24 km) long and runs parallel to MD 170 in the vicinity of MD 100's exit 11.
- MD 100-V is a short 0.04-mile-long (64 m) segment of Executive Park Drive from the MD 100 eastbound exit 1B offramp to the access road in MD 100's median. The route is in Ellicott City, Howard County.
- MD 100-W is the designation for a 0.29-mile-long (0.47 km) segment of Snowden River Parkway in Columbia, Howard County. It runs from the intersection of MD 108 (Waterloo Road) and Snowden River Parkway to a roundabout for the MD 100 eastbound ramps at exit 3.
- MD 100-X is the designation for an unnamed road in Elkridge, Anne Arundel County. The route begins at the intersection of US 1 and Amberton Drive and travels north for 0.095 miles (153 m) before ending at a private driveway.
