= Maryland Route 177 =

State highway in Maryland, U.S.

Maryland Route 177
- Mountain Road
- Maryland Route 177 highlighted in red

Route information
- Maintained by MDSHA
- Length: 10.92 mi (17.57 km)
- Existed: 1927–present

Major junctions
- West end: MD 2 in Pasadena
- MD 10 in Pasadena; MD 648 in Pasadena; MD 607 in Jacobsville; MD 100 in Jacobsville
- East end: Gibson Island

Location
- Country: United States
- State: Maryland
- Counties: Anne Arundel

Highway system
- Maryland highway system; Interstate; US; State; Scenic Byways
← MD 176	→ MD 178

Maryland Route 177 (MD 177) is a state highway in the U.S. state of Maryland. Known as Mountain Road, the highway runs 10.92 miles (17.57 km) from MD 2 in Pasadena/Glen Burnie east to Gibson Island. MD 177 serves as an arterial highway through Pasadena, Jacobsville, and the Lake Shore area of northeastern Anne Arundel County. The highway is paralleled by MD 100 through Pasadena and Jacobsville. MD 177 originally began near what is now its western intersection with MD 648, which was originally part of MD 2. A short section of the highway was built in Pasadena in the early 1910s. MD 177 was extended east through Jacobsville in the early 1920s and to Gibson Island in the late 1920s. The highway was extended west in the late 1930s after MD 2 was relocated to its present four-lane divided highway. A freeway section of MD 177 was constructed between MD 3 in Glen Burnie and MD 2 in the mid-1960s; the freeway was renumbered MD 100 when that highway was completed from Pasadena to Jacobsville in the early 1970s. Congestion east of MD 100 led to the addition of a reversible lane in 1999.

== Route description ==
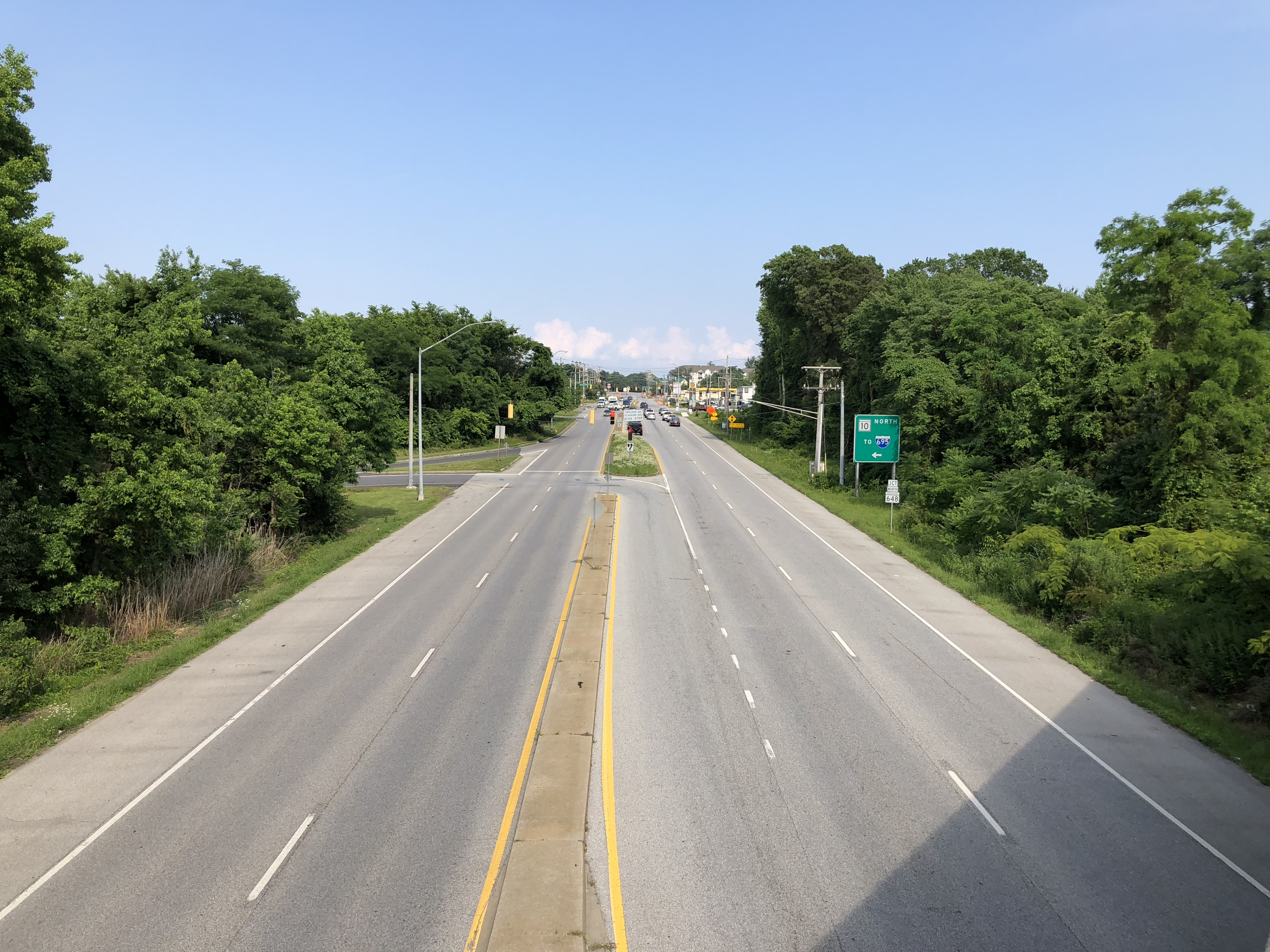
View east along MD 177 from MD 10 in Pasadena

MD 177 begins at an intersection with MD 2 (Governor Ritchie Highway) in Pasadena just north of MD 2's interchange with MD 100 (Paul T. Pitcher Memorial Highway). The state highway heads east as a six-lane divided highway which drops to four lanes at its intersection with a ramp from southbound MD 10 (Arundel Expressway) and ramps to and from westbound MD 100. MD 177 passes under MD 10, spawns a ramp onto northbound MD 10, and meets the southern end of MD 648 (Baltimore–Annapolis Boulevard) at Lipin's Corner. At the next intersection, unsigned MD 915 (Long Hill Road) splits to the south. MD 177 continues east as a two-lane undivided road that regularly gains a center left-turn lane. The state highway intersects another section of MD 648 (Waterford Road), Catherine Avenue, and Edwin Raynor Boulevard on its way to Jacobsville. In the center of Jacobsville, MD 177 intersects MD 607, which heads south as Magothy Bridge Road and north as Hog Neck Road.

East of Jacobsville, MD 177 received the eastern end of MD 100. There is no direct access from eastbound MD 100 to westbound MD 177. The state highway becomes a three-lane road with the reversible center lane controlled by lane use signals. During rush hours, there are two lanes in the relevant direction; at all other times, the center lane serves as a center left-turn lane. The eastern end of the three-lane section is at South Carolina Avenue in the community of Lake Shore. MD 177 continues east as a two-lane undivided road and passes a loop of Old Mountain Road before heading south of Chesapeake High School. At Pinehurst Road, which leads to Downs Memorial Park, the route veers southeast toward Gibson Island. MD 177 reaches its eastern terminus at the gatehouse that guards the private island community on the north side of the mouth of the Magothy River at the Chesapeake Bay.

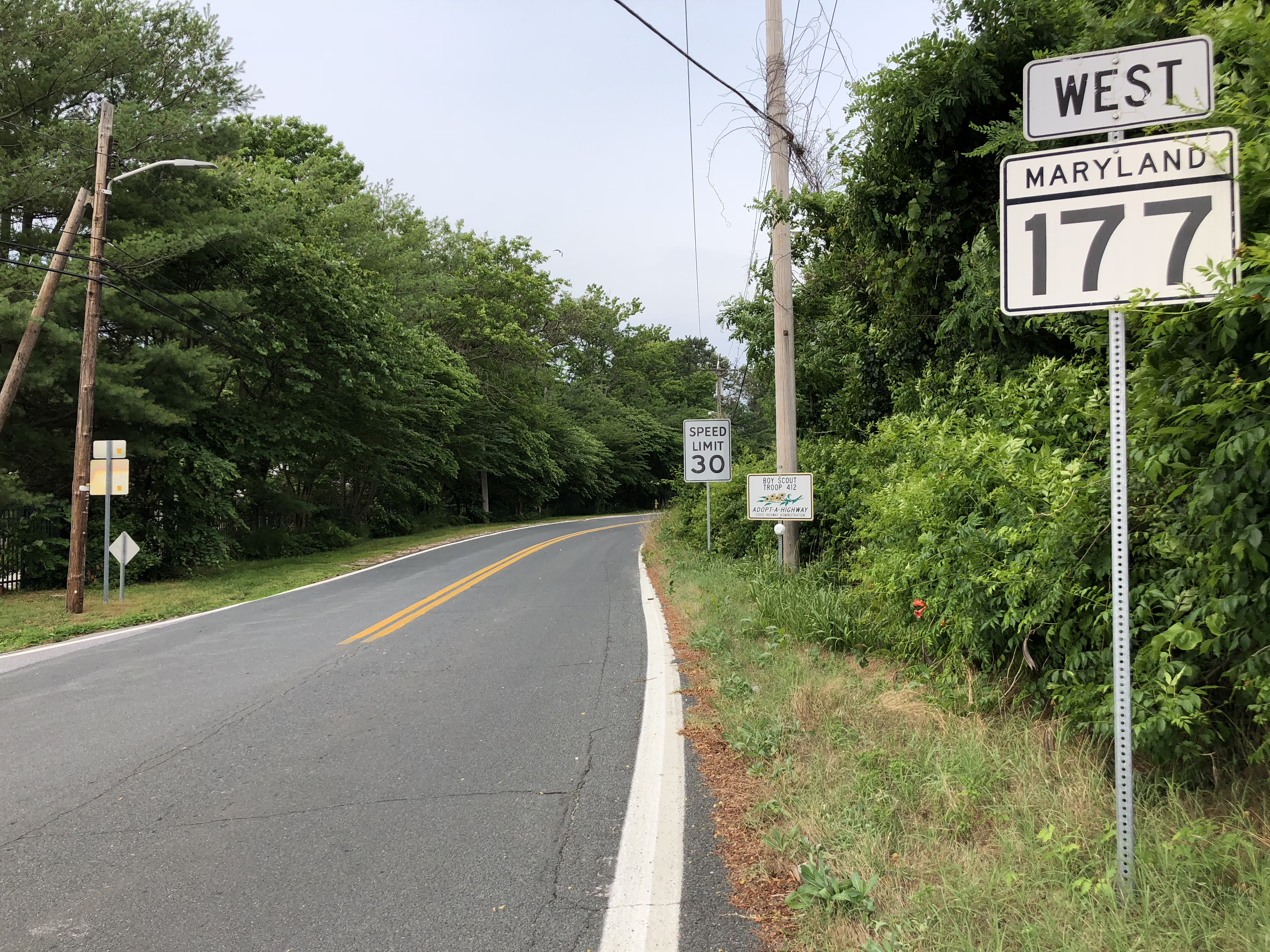
View west from the east end of MD 177 at Gibson Island

MD 177 is a part of the National Highway System as a principal arterial from MD 100 in Jacobsville to Pinehurst Road near Gibson Island.

== History ==
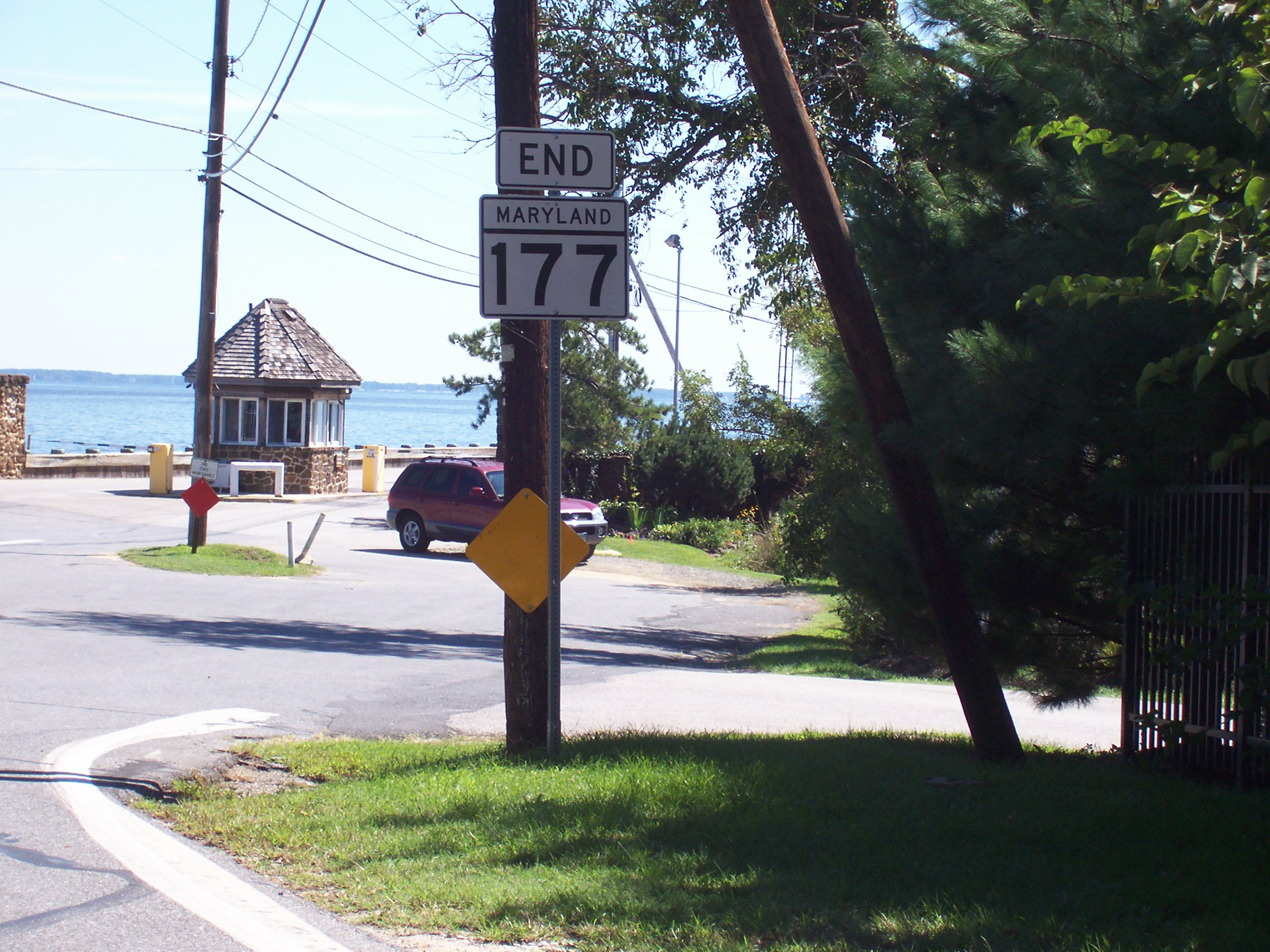
Eastern terminus of MD 177 with the gatehouse at the entrance to Gibson Island in the background

The first portion of MD 177 to be constructed was the portion of the Baltimore–Annapolis Boulevard between what are now MD 648 and MD 915 at Lipin's Corner. That highway, which was designated MD 2 in 1927, was paved as a 16-foot (4.9 m) wide macadam road in 1911 and 1912. This segment of the Boulevard was widened to 22 feet (6.7 m) with a pair of 3-foot (0.91 m) concrete shoulders by 1926. Mountain Road itself was paved as a 14-foot (4.3 m) wide concrete road from Lipin's Corner east to just east of the modern Waterford Road segment of MD 648. By 1921, the concrete road was extended east to Jacobsville. The paved portion of Mountain Road was extended east to near Woods Road by 1923. MD 177 was completed as a concrete highway to Gibson Island in 1928. MD 177 was widened to at least 18 feet (5.5 m) from Lipin's Corner to Gibson Island by 1930. After MD 2 was relocated to Governor Ritchie Highway in 1936, MD 177 was extended west from Lipin's Corner to the new four-lane divided highway by 1939. MD 177 was reconstructed from Lipin's Corner to east of Jacobsville to ameliorate curves in 1952.

A westward freeway extension of MD 177 was under construction from MD 3 (Glen Burnie Bypass) east to MD 2 by 1963. The freeway opened as MD 177 in 1964 with intermediate interchanges at MD 174 and Oakwood Road. In 1966, the freeway was extended slightly east to terminate at Mountain Road at an intersection at the site of today's ramps to and from westbound MD 100. By 1967, an extension of the freeway east to beyond Jacobsville was proposed. The eastward freeway extension opened in 1971; however, the extension and the freeway west to MD 3 were designated MD 100. MD 177 was expanded to a divided highway from MD 2 to MD 10 when the latter freeway was extended south from MD 648 to MD 100 between 1987 and 1989. The divided highway was extended east to Lipin's Corner in 1997. Since the late 1970s, heavy traffic on MD 177 east of MD 100 has spurred efforts to build a bypass of the Lake Shore section or widen the highway, projects that have been opposed by residents who fear increased development on the peninsula. Congestion on the highway was eased significantly when lane use signals were added to allow the center lane of the highway to become a travel lane during rush hours in July 1999.

== Junction list ==
The entire route is in Anne Arundel County.

Location	mi	km	Destinations	Notes
Pasadena	0.00	0.00	MD 2 (Governor Ritchie Highway) – Severna Park, Glen Burnie	Western terminus
Pasadena	0.45	0.72	MD 100 west (Paul T. Pitcher Memorial Highway)	MD 100 Exit 16; exit from and entrance to westbound MD 100
Pasadena	0.60	0.97	MD 10 north (Arundel Expressway) to I-695	Southbound exit from and northbound entrance to MD 10
Pasadena	0.80	1.29	MD 648 north (Baltimore–Annapolis Boulevard) – Glen Burnie	Officially MD 648E; southern terminus of MD 648E
Pasadena	1.97	3.17	MD 648 south (Waterford Road) – Severna Park	Officially MD 648H; northern terminus of MD 648H
Jacobsville	4.22	6.79	MD 607 (Hog Neck Road/Magothy Bridge Road) to MD 100	
Jacobsville	5.07	8.16	MD 100 west (Paul T. Pitcher Memorial Highway)	No direct access from eastbound MD 100 to westbound MD 177; eastern terminus of MD 100
Gibson Island	10.92	17.57	Entrance to Gibson Island	Eastern terminus
1.000 mi = 1.609 km; 1.000 km = 0.621 mi: Incomplete access
