= Maryland Route 173 =

State highway in Maryland

Maryland Route 173
- Maryland Route 173 highlighted in red

Route information
- Maintained by MDSHA and Baltimore DOT
- Length: 13.78 mi (22.18 km)
- Existed: 1927–present

Major junctions
- South end: Fort Smallwood Park near Jacobsville
- MD 607 in Jacobsville; I-695 in Baltimore; MD 710 in Baltimore; MD 171 in Baltimore
- North end: I-895 Toll / MD 2 in Baltimore

Location
- Country: United States
- State: Maryland
- Counties: Anne Arundel, City of Baltimore

Highway system
- Maryland highway system; Interstate; US; State; Scenic Byways
← MD 172	→ MD 174

Maryland Route 173 (MD 173) is a state highway in the U.S. state of Maryland. Known for most of its length as Fort Smallwood Road, the state highway runs 13.78 miles (22.18 km) from Fort Smallwood Park near Jacobsville north to MD 2 in the Brooklyn neighborhood of Baltimore. MD 173 connects the beach communities of Riviera Beach and Orchard Beach in northeastern Anne Arundel County and Interstate 695 (I-695) with industrial areas in the Baltimore neighborhoods of Hawkins Point and Curtis Bay, including the United States Coast Guard Yard. MD 173 was mostly constructed in the 1920s and early 1930s. The state highway was put in its modern form with the completion of the bridge over Stony Creek in the late 1940s and expansion to a divided highway between Orchard Beach and Curtis Bay in the late 1970s.

== Route description ==
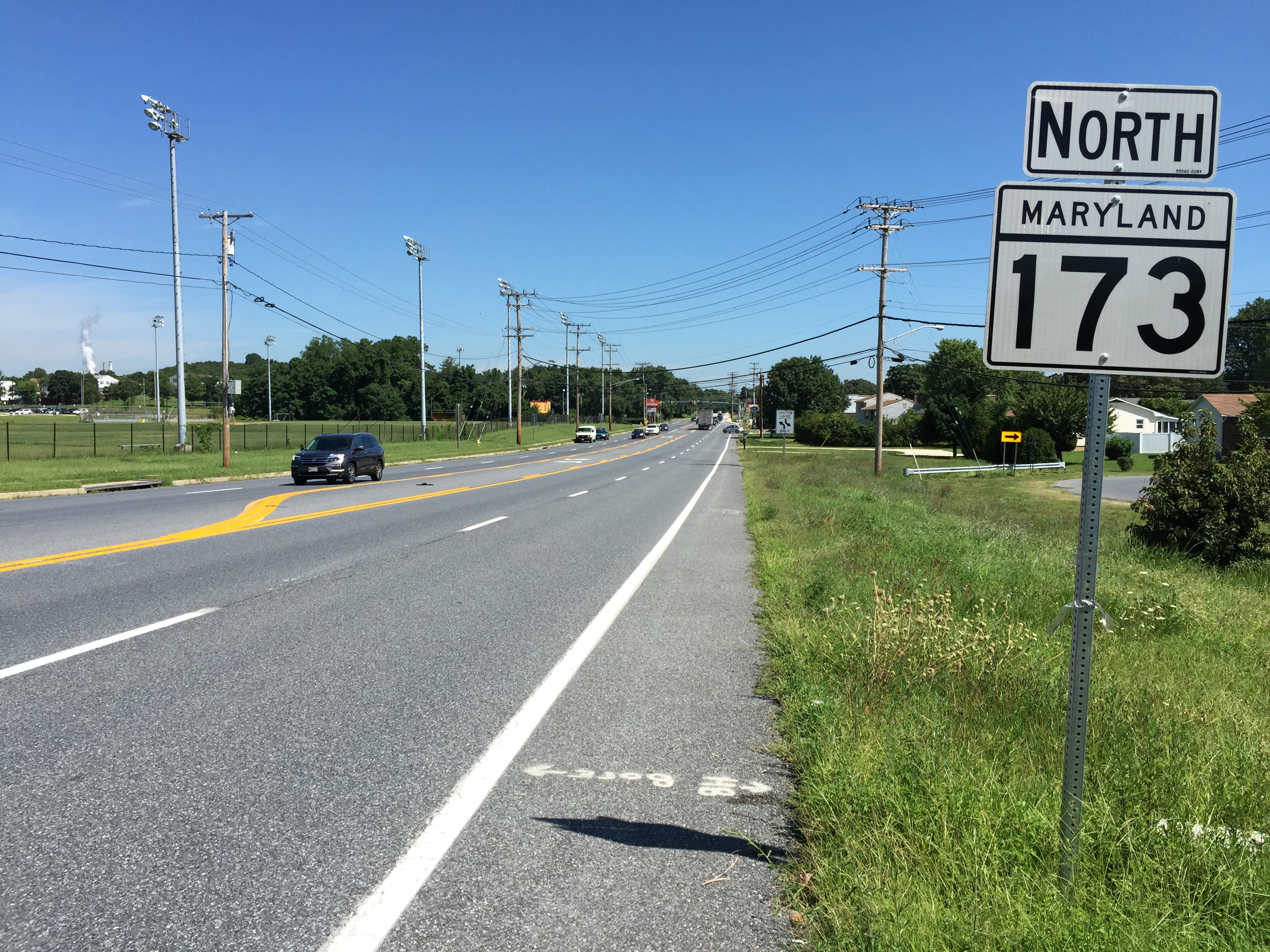
View north along MD 173 just south of Riviera Beach

MD 173 begins at the entrance to Fort Smallwood Park northeast of Jacobsville. The state highway heads south as Fort Smallwood Road, a two-lane undivided road that passes by several small beach communities on the Hog Neck peninsula. After intersecting Bayside Beach Road, MD 173 turns southwest and passes along the northern edge of Jacobsville, where the highway meets the northern end of MD 607 (Hog Neck Road). The state highway crosses Rock Creek and meets the northern end of Edwin Raynor Boulevard, where the highway turns north onto a four-lane road with a center left-turn lane. MD 173 passes east of Northeast Senior High School in Riviera Beach before the highway reduces to a two-lane road with center turn lane at its intersection with Duvall Highway.

MD 173 continues north into Riviera Beach. At its intersection with Riviera Drive and Bar Harbor Road, the state highway turns west and crosses Stony Creek on a drawbridge. In Orchard Beach, MD 173 intersects the western end of its old alignment, MD 642 (Greenland Beach Road), then expands to a four-lane road with a center left-turn lane. Passing Cox Creek, the state highway becomes a four-lane divided highway and passes west of the Herbert A. Wagner Generating Station and the adjacent Brandon Shores Generating Station. MD 173 turns north at Solley Road and passes Marley Neck Boulevard before entering the city of Baltimore. Upon entering the Hawkins Point area, the state highway meets Fort Armistead Road, which leads to Fort Armistead Park and an entrance ramp to eastbound I-695 (Baltimore Beltway). MD 173 turns west and its name changes to Hawkins Point Road before the highway intersects Quarantine Road, which leads to a three-quarter diamond interchange with I-695.

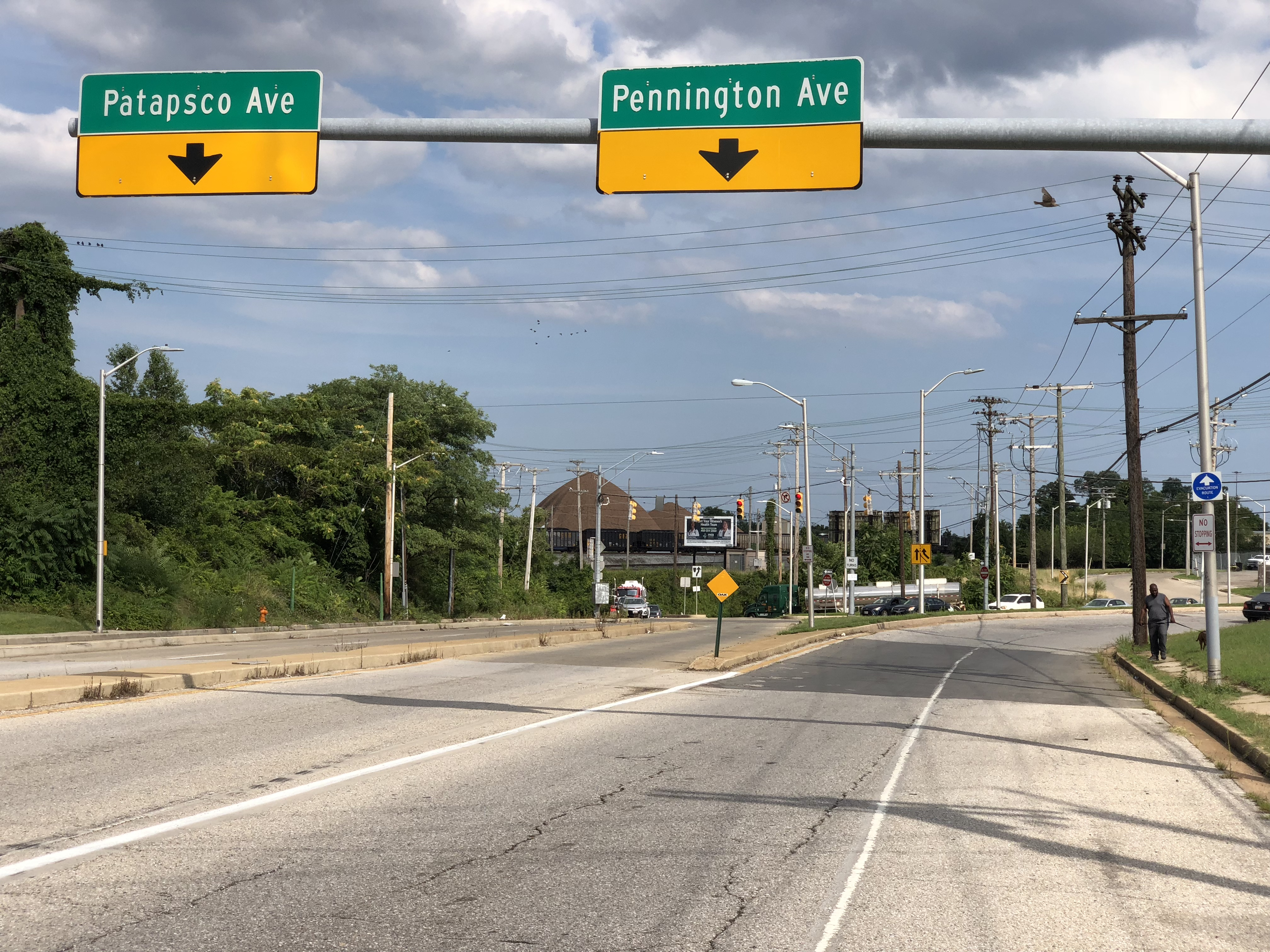
View south along MD 173 at Patapsco Avenue in Baltimore

MD 173 continues west as a four-lane undivided highway through the industrial area of Hawkins Point. The state highway passes MD 172 (Arundel Cove Road) and then the access road to the U.S. Coast Guard Yard. MD 173 crosses CSX's Marley Neck Branch railroad line and expands to a divided highway. The state highway, now named Pennington Avenue, passes under I-695 and then over Curtis Creek on a drawbridge. The state highway meets the eastern terminus of MD 710 (Ordnance Road) before reducing to an undivided highway and crossing Cabin Branch on twin bridges. MD 173 intersects CSX's Marley Neck Branch rail line at-grade and enters the neighborhood of Curtis Bay. The northbound direction of MD 173 makes a pair of right-angle turns, east onto Birch Street and then north onto Curtis Avenue; the southbound direction uses Pennington Avenue through the neighborhood. Curtis Avenue divides the residential and industrial portions of the neighborhood. MD 173 meets the eastern terminus of MD 171 (Church Street) within Curtis Bay. At the northern end of the neighborhood, the one-way pair ends and MD 173 turns west onto Patapsco Avenue to pass through Brooklyn as a four-lane undivided street. The westbound highway has an entrance ramp to I-895 (Harbor Tunnel Thruway) immediately before reaching its northern terminus at MD 2 (Potee Street). Patapsco Avenue continues as a municipal highway across the Patapsco River toward Southwest Baltimore.

MD 173 is part of the National Highway System as an intermodal connector between Quarantine Road in Hawkins Point and Patapsco Avenue in Curtis Bay. The highway is also a National Highway System principal arterial from MD 607 in Jacobsville to Quarantine Road and from Patapsco Avenue to its northern terminus in Baltimore.

== History ==
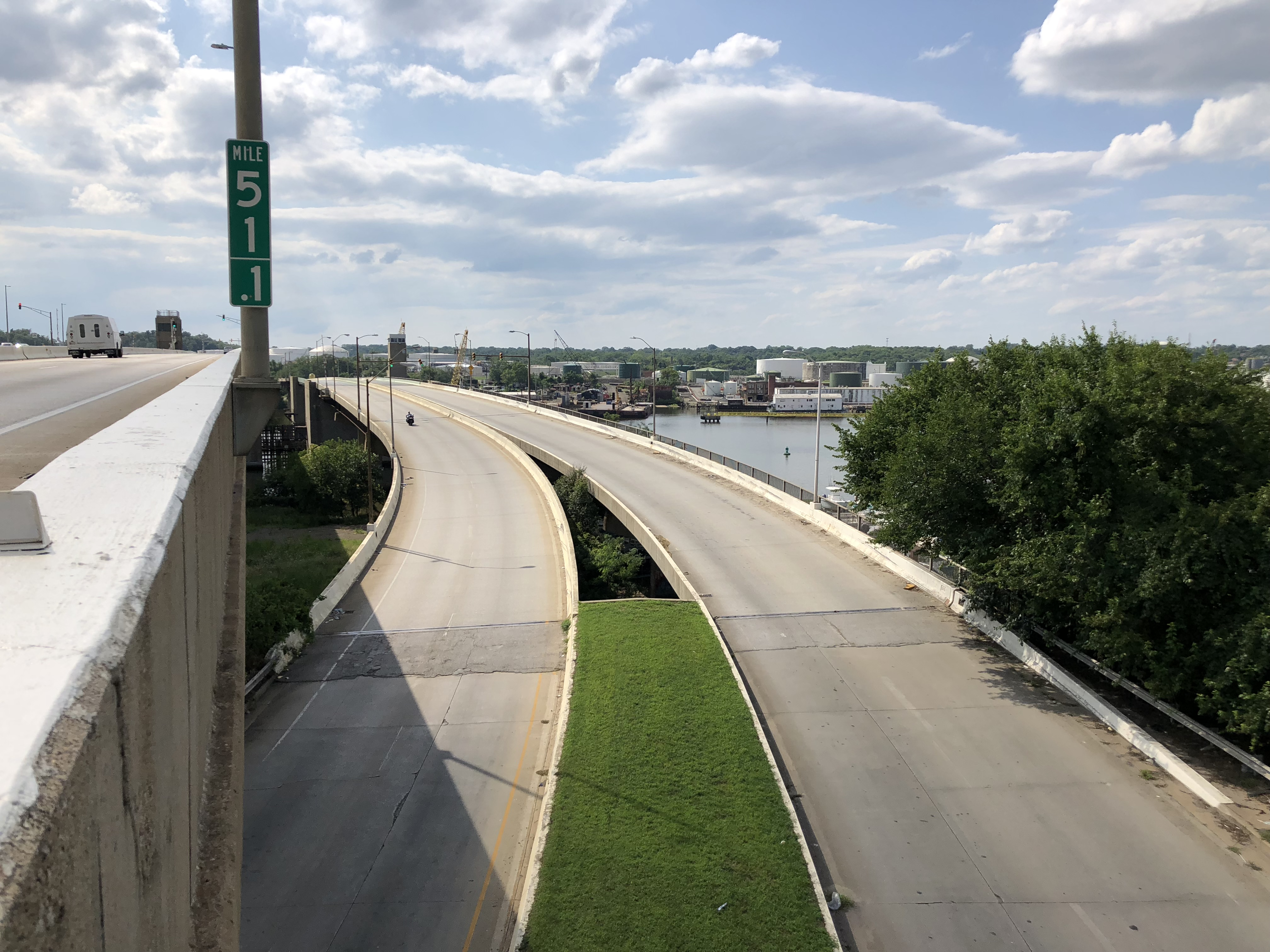
MD 173 northbound crossing Curtis Creek

Patapsco Avenue was under construction as a 16-to-24-foot (4.9 to 7.3 m) wide macadam road by 1911 and completed by 1915. Pennington Avenue from Patapsco Avenue south to Birch Street at the south end of the Curtis Bay neighborhood was paved with 16-foot (4.9 m) wide bituminous concrete by 1915. Both streets and Hawkins Point Road were in Anne Arundel County until the Baltimore city limits expanded to their present boundaries in 1919. MD 173 from the city limit south of Fort Armistead Road to Marley Neck Road was paved in concrete in 1924 and 1925. The adjacent city portion of the state highway was paved northwest to Arundel Cove Avenue in 1925 and 1926. The pavement was extended from Marley Neck Road to the west side of Stony Creek in Orchard Beach in 1928. MD 173 was paved from the east side of Stony Creek east and south to the southern end of Riviera Beach starting in 1930. That segment and the remainder of the highway to Fort Smallwood were complete in 1932. The gap in MD 173 between Arundel Cove Avenue and the south end of the Curtis Bay neighborhood was filled in 1935, completing the 15-to-18-foot (4.6 to 5.5 m) wide concrete highway from Baltimore to Fort Smallwood.

MD 173's original bridge over Stony Creek between Riviera Beach and Orchard Beach was replaced with a new structure in 1948, replacing a wooden one-lane structure. The approach to the defunct bridge became MD 642. MD 173 was widened to 22 feet (6.7 m) and resurfaced south of Riviera Beach that same year. MD 173 was relocated at its crossing of Curtis Creek contemporaneously with the construction of the Baltimore Beltway through the area. The highway's new four-lane drawbridge over the creek was completed and the highway was expanded to a four-lane divided highway from MD 710 east to the city limit in 1976. MD 173 was expanded to a divided highway from the city limit southeast to Orchard Beach in 1978. The highway's new dual bridges over Cabin Branch were completed in 1986.

== Junction list ==
County	Location	mi	km	Destinations	Notes
Anne Arundel		0.00	0.00	Entrance to Fort Smallwood Park	Southern terminus
Anne Arundel	Jacobsville	3.00	4.83	MD 607 south (Hog Neck Road)	Northern terminus of MD 607
Baltimore City		8.99	14.47	Fort Armistead Road east to I-695 Toll east (Baltimore Beltway) – Francis Scott Key Bridge, Essex	Southbound jughandle; ramp to eastbound I-695 is closed due to Francis Scott Key Bridge collapse
Baltimore City		9.36	15.06	Quarantine Road north to I-695 west (Baltimore Beltway) – Glen Burnie	
Baltimore City		9.71	15.63	Arundel Cove Road south	Unsigned MD 172
Baltimore City		10.76	17.32	MD 710 west (Ordnance Road) – Glen Burnie	Eastern terminus of MD 710
Baltimore City		11.82	19.02	MD 171 west (Church Street) – Brooklyn Park	Eastern terminus of MD 171
Baltimore City		13.78	22.18	MD 2 (Potee Street) / I-895 Toll north (Harbor Tunnel Thruway) / Patapsco Avenue west – Glen Burnie, Downtown Baltimore, New York	Northern terminus; I-895 Exit 7; no exit before toll on I-895
1.000 mi = 1.609 km; 1.000 km = 0.621 mi

== Auxiliary route ==
MD 173A is the unsigned designation for a bypassed section of MD 173 near the intersection of that highway and Edwin Raynor Boulevard. MD 173A runs 0.14 mi (0.23 km) from MD 173 north to Rock Hill Road near Jacobsville. The state highway was assigned in 2001 when the intersection of MD 173 and Edwin Raynor Boulevard was rebuilt so the roads meet at a right angle.
