= Glynn Davis =

Free agent
- Outfielder
- Born: December 7, 1991 (age 34); Baltimore, Maryland
- Bats: Right Throws: Right
- Stats at Baseball Reference

Glynn William Davis (born December 7, 1991) is an American professional baseball outfielder who is a free agent.

== Career ==
=== Amateur ===
Davis attended Northeast Senior High School in Pasadena, Maryland. He played for the school's baseball team as a shortstop. Davis planned on enrolling at Anne Arundel Community College, but a high school teammate convinced him to enroll at Catonsville Community College instead. Playing as a shortstop for the school's baseball team, Davis batted .430 with 10 home runs and 35 stolen bases, and was named a Junior College All-American. He went undrafted in the 2010 Major League Baseball draft, and committed to transfer to the University of Central Florida (UCF) to continue his college baseball career with the UCF Knights baseball team.

=== Baltimore Orioles ===
After playing in the All-American Amateur Baseball Association over the summer, Davis signed with the Baltimore Orioles as a free agent, bypassing his commitment to UCF. The Orioles decided to use Davis as a center fielder, due to his speed.

Davis played for the Aberdeen IronBirds of the Low–A New York–Penn League in 2011, where he had a .271 batting average and 24 stolen bases. He played for the Delmarva Shorebirds of the Single–A South Atlantic League and the Frederick Keys of the High–A Carolina League in 2012, batting a combined .253 with 37 stolen bases. Returning to Frederick in 2013, Davis struggled with a hamstring injury, and registered career lows with a .234 batting average and 19 stolen bases. He began working with Jeff Manto, the Orioles' minor league hitting instructor, and was assigned to Frederick again in 2014, and was named a Carolina League All-Star. After he batted .295 with 65 runs scored and 20 stolen bases in 28 attempts in 89 games for Frederick, the Orioles promoted him to the Bowie Baysox of the Double–A Eastern League on July 22. He hit .313 in 26 games for Bowie.

In 2017, Davis played in 92 games split between Bowie and the Triple–A Norfolk Tides, hitting .256/.296/.375 with 4 home runs, 37 RBI, and 9 stolen bases. He elected free agency following the season on November 6, 2017.
