= Maryland Route 171 =

State highway in Maryland, United States, known as Church St

Maryland Route 171
- Church Street

Route information
- Maintained by MDSHA and Baltimore DOT
- Length: 1.54 mi (2.48 km)
- Existed: 1927–present

Major junctions
- West end: MD 2 in Brooklyn Park
- East end: MD 173 in Baltimore

Location
- Country: United States
- State: Maryland
- Counties: Anne Arundel, City of Baltimore

Highway system
- Maryland highway system; Interstate; US; State; Scenic Byways
← MD 170	→ MD 172

Maryland Route 171 (MD 171) is a state highway in the U.S. state of Maryland. Known as Church Street, the state highway runs 1.54 miles (2.48 km) from MD 2 in Brooklyn Park, Anne Arundel County, east to MD 173 in the Curtis Bay neighborhood of Baltimore. MD 171 was constructed in the mid-1920s.

== Route description ==
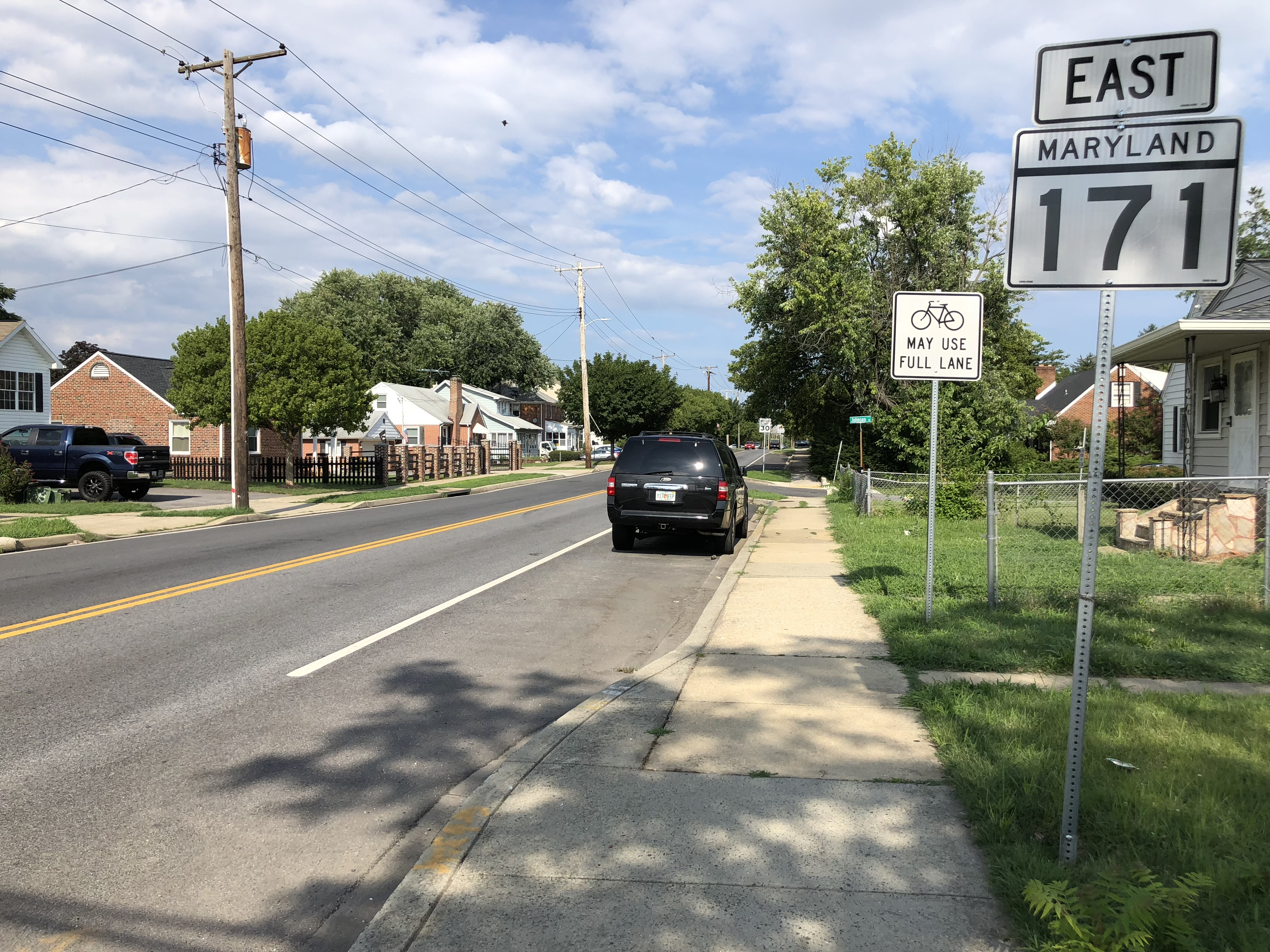
View east along MD 171 at MD 2 in Brooklyn Park

MD 171 begins at an intersection with MD 2 (Governor Ritchie Highway) in Brooklyn Park, Anne Arundel County. The state highway heads east as a two-lane undivided street through a densely populated residential neighborhood. After crossing 6th Street, MD 171 enters the city of Baltimore. After passing through the Curtis Bay neighborhood, the state highway meets its eastern terminus on the edge of the Curtis Bay Industrial Area at MD 173, which is formed by a one-way pair, Pennington Avenue southbound and Curtis Avenue northbound.

== History ==
Church Street was laid out through what was then entirely Anne Arundel County by 1907. The Anne Arundel County portion of MD 171 was paved as a 15-foot (4.6 m) wide concrete road in 1926. It is not clear when the city part of the highway was paved, but the city portion was designated a state highway by 1946.

== Junction list ==
County	Location	mi	km	Destinations	Notes
Anne Arundel	Brooklyn Park	0.00	0.00	MD 2 (Governor Ritchie Highway) – Glen Burnie, Baltimore	Western terminus
Baltimore City		1.46	2.35	MD 173 south (Pennington Avenue) – Orchard Beach	
Baltimore City		1.54	2.48	MD 173 north (Curtis Avenue) – Downtown Baltimore	Eastern terminus
1.000 mi = 1.609 km; 1.000 km = 0.621 mi
