= Craighill Channel Lower Range Rear Light =

Lighthouse in Maryland, United States

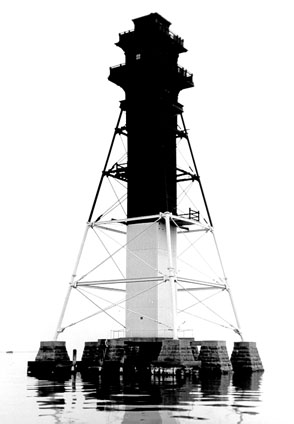
- 1960 photograph of CraigHill Lower Range Rear Light (USCG)
- Location: Off Ramona Beach, Maryland (near Edgemere) in the Chesapeake Bay
- Coordinates: 39.2291°N 76.3942°W

Tower
- Foundation: stone pilings
- Construction: iron skeleton tower
- Automated: 1964
- Height: 105 feet (32 m)
- Shape: pyramidal with square central shaft
- Heritage: National Register of Historic Places listed place

Light
- First lit: 1873 (temporary lights), completed 1875
- Focal height: 32 m (105 ft)
- Range: 16 nautical miles (30 km; 18 mi)
- Characteristic: Fixed white
- Cut-off Channel Range Rear Light Station
- U.S. National Register of Historic Places
- Nearest city: Edgemere, Maryland
- Area: less than one acre
- Built: 1886
- MPS: Light Stations of the United States MPS
- NRHP reference No.: 02001418
- Added to NRHP: December 2, 2002

The Craighill Channel Lower Range Rear Light is one of a pair of range lights that marks the first section of the shipping channel into Baltimore harbor. It is the tallest lighthouse in Maryland.

== History ==
Congress appropriated $50,000 in 1870 to enlarge the channel into Baltimore Harbor. The new channels were named after William Craighill, a lighthouse board member who supervised the surveys for the excavation. The first section of channel, starting from where Baltimore Light now stands, headed almost due north before turning into the Patapsco River, and new range lights were required to make it usable at night.

Initially the plan was to use screw-pile lighthouses (shore lights were never considered); ice in the winter of 1872–1873 led them to reconsider this, and the front light was built as a small caisson structure. For the rear light a grid of nine stone piers was laid out, and a pyramidal iron tower was erected. A central shaft of wood timbers sheathed in iron plates held the staircase to the lantern, and a wooden house surrounded this at the base of the light.

The expense of constructing foundation for the two lights exhausted the original appropriation and delayed completion until 1875; in the intervening two years lightships were used instead. The wooden construction of the central shaft had problems with rotting almost from the start, and as recently as 1994 a Coast Guard study suggested that it be removed. However, with repairs over the years it remains in place. The house was reportedly rented out when the light was automated in 1923, and it was finally removed in 1938.

== Sources ==
- "Historic Light Station Information and Photography: Maryland" (PDF). United States Coast Guard Historian's Office.
- Craighill Range Lighthouses, from the Chesapeake Chapter of the United States Lighthouse Society
- Craighill Channel Lower Rear Light at lighthousefriends.org
- Rowlett, Russ. "Lighthouses of the United States: Maryland". The Lighthouse Directory. University of North Carolina at Chapel Hill.
- Chesapeake Bay Lighthouse Project - Craighill Channel Range Lights
- Craighill Channel Lower Range Rear Light, Baltimore County, at Maryland Historical Trust
