= Maryland Route 103 =

State highway in Maryland, United States

Maryland Route 103
- Maryland Route 103 highlighted in red

Route information
- Maintained by MDSHA
- Length: 8.29 mi (13.34 km)
- Existed: 1927–present

Major junctions
- West end: St. Johns Lane in Ellicott City
- US 29 in Ellicott City; MD 104 in Ellicott City; MD 100 near Elkridge; US 1 near Dorsey
- East end: Parkway Drive South in Hanover

Location
- Country: United States
- State: Maryland
- Counties: Howard, Anne Arundel

Highway system
- Maryland highway system; Interstate; US; State; Scenic Byways
← MD 100	→ MD 104

Maryland Route 103 (MD 103) is a state highway in the U.S. state of Maryland. The state highway runs 8.29 miles (13.34 km) from St. Johns Lane in Ellicott City east to Parkway Drive South in Hanover. MD 103 serves as the local complement to MD 100 from Ellicott City in northeastern Howard County through Dorsey to Hanover in northwestern Anne Arundel County. The state highway was constructed from U.S. Route 1 (US 1) in Elkridge to US 29 in Ellicott City in the 1920s. MD 103's eastern terminus was relocated from Elkridge to US 1 near Dorsey in 1956. When MD 100 was constructed between Glen Burnie and Ellicott City in the 1990s, the state highway was extended to its present western and eastern termini. MD 103 replaced MD 176 from US 1 east to near MD 295.

== Route description ==
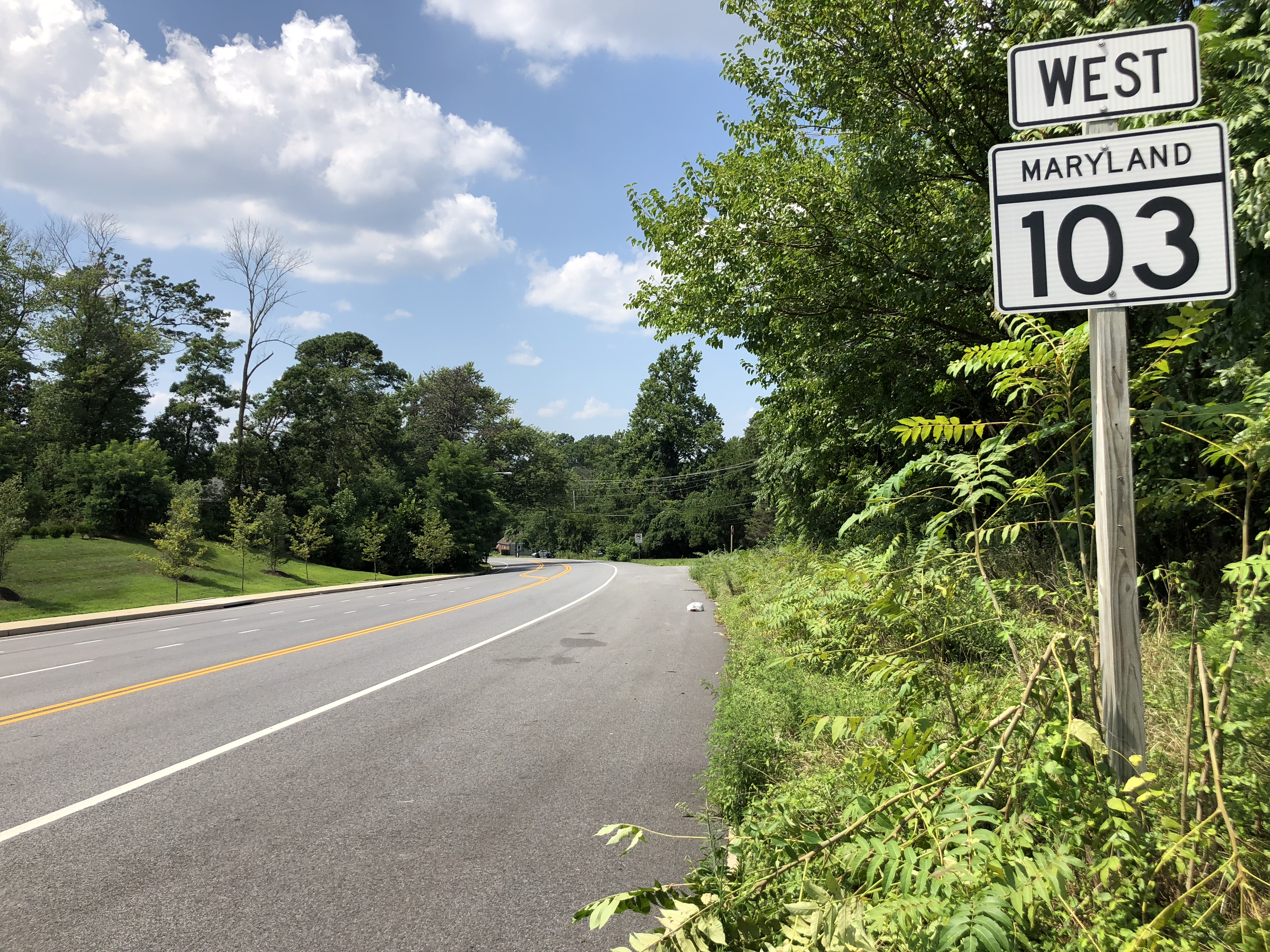
View west along MD 103 in Hanover

MD 103 begins at a point on St. Johns Lane just west of its intersection with High Point Road in Ellicott City. St. Johns Lane continues west to Columbia Road, where the county highway turns north toward US 40. MD 103 heads east as Montgomery Road, a four-lane undivided highway, through a three-quarter diamond interchange with US 29 (Columbia Pike). Access to MD 103 from northbound US 29 is via MD 100 and Long Gate Parkway, which the state highway intersects east of Old Columbia Pike, which heads northeast into the Ellicott City Historic District. East of Long Gate Parkway, MD 103 reduces to two lanes and has a sporadic center left-turn lane. Before leaving Ellicott City, the highway intersects the northern terminus of MD 104 (Waterloo Road) and Ilchester Road, which heads east to the hamlet of Ilchester on the Patapsco River, where the county highway provides access to Patapsco Valley State Park and the ruins of the Baltimore and Ohio Railroad's Patterson Viaduct. On the western edge of Elkridge at Miller's Corner, MD 103 intersects the county-maintained portion of Montgomery Road, which heads east to the center of Elkridge.

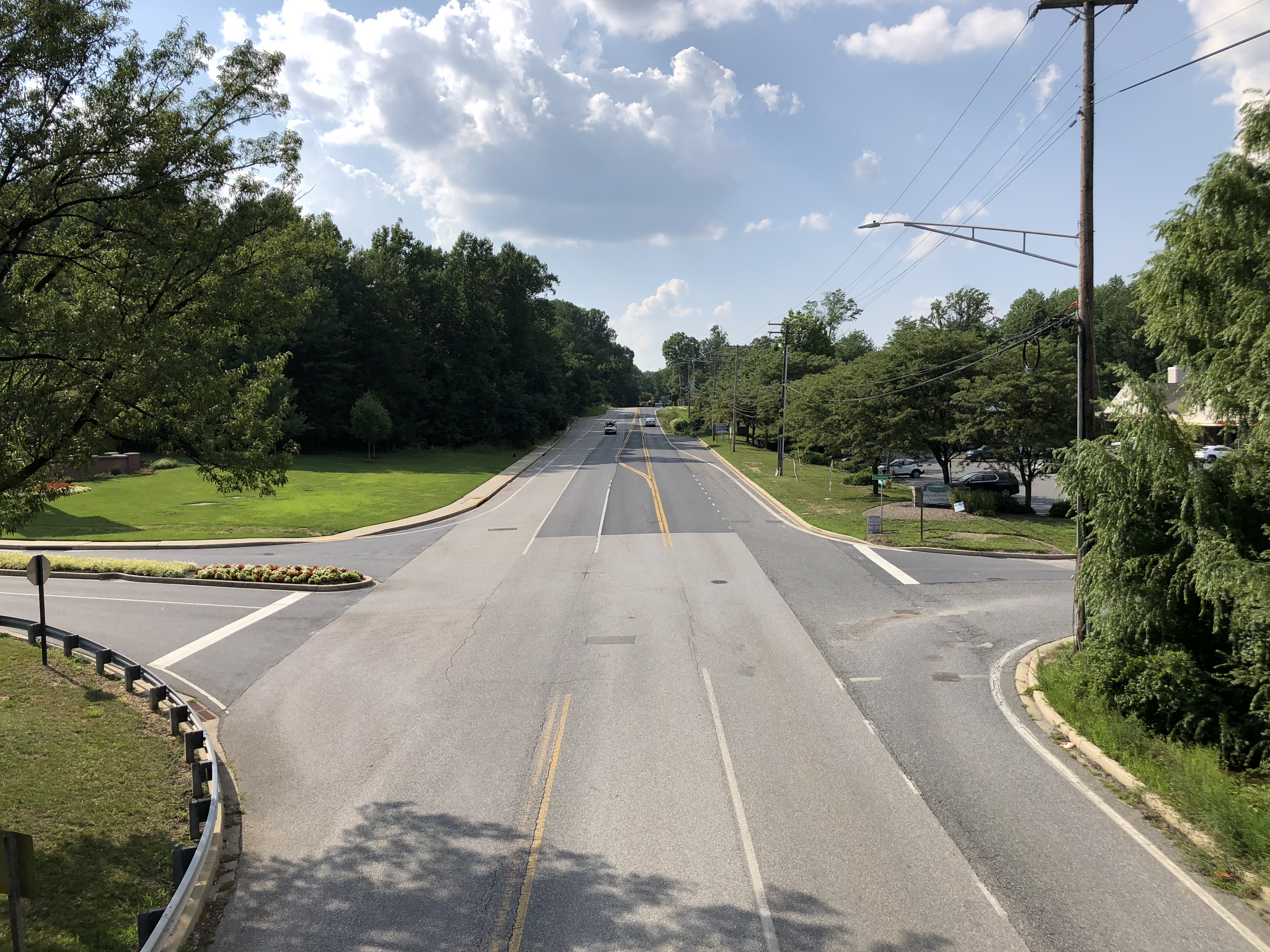
View west along MD 103 from I-95 in Ilchester

MD 103 continues southeast along Meadowridge Road, which meets MD 100 at a dumbbell interchange. The highway passes under Interstate 95 (I-95) with no access and passes between Meadow Ridge Memorial Park on the north and an industrial park to the south before its intersection with US 1 (Washington Boulevard). MD 103 continues east as Dorsey Road, which curves northeast and then southeast again. The route crosses Deep Run and passes through the community of Dorsey, where the highway enters Anne Arundel County by passing under CSX's Capital Subdivision railroad line, which carries MARC's Camden Line. The highway crosses a branch of Deep Run and begins to parallel the eastbound side of MD 100. MD 103's name changes to Parkway Drive South just east of its intersection with Coca-Cola Drive, which is unsigned MD 100M and has an interchange with MD 100 immediately to the north. The state highway reaches its eastern terminus at an arbitrary point east of Race Road in a business park adjacent to MD 100's interchange with MD 295 (Baltimore–Washington Parkway) in Hanover.

MD 103 is a part of the National Highway System as an intermodal connector from US 1 east to Douglas Legum Drive at Dorsey.

== History ==
MD 103 originally followed all of Montgomery Road from US 1 in Elkridge, which followed Old Washington Road, to US 29 (Old Columbia Pike) in Ellicott City. The first section of MD 103 was paved in concrete from US 1 to west of Landing Road by 1923. The next section was constructed as a concrete road from there west to the highway's intersection with Meadowridge Road at Miller's Corner in 1924 and 1925. A disjoint section of MD 103 was built from US 29 east to near New Cut Road in 1928. Montgomery Road was completed from near New Cut Road east to Miller's Corner by 1930.

The portion of MD 103 east of US 1 was originally part of MD 176, which was completed as a concrete road from Glen Burnie west to the B&O Railroad in Dorsey on the Howard–Anne Arundel county line by 1930. The portion between the county line and US 1 was constructed around 1936; MD 176 originally met US 1 at an intersection just south of the modern US 1–MD 100 interchange. The Howard County portion of MD 176 was widened in 1949. MD 103 was widened from US 1 to Waterloo Road, which was then part of MD 175, in 1950. The state highway was widened from Waterloo Road to US 29 starting in 1953. In 1956, MD 103 was removed from Montgomery Road from Miller's Corner to Elkridge and instead placed on Meadowridge Road from Miller's Corner to US 1 near Dorsey.

Several changes occurred in the route of MD 103 due to the construction of MD 100 in the 1990s. MD 103 was extended to its present western terminus when its interchange with US 29 was built in 1992. The western end of MD 176 was relocated to the double-curve alignment in Dorsey to tie into the eastern end of MD 103 by 1995. MD 176 was cut in two when MD 100 took over the former highway's interchange with the Baltimore–Washington Parkway. By 1997, MD 103 replaced MD 176 on Dorsey Road west of the parkway. That same year, the intersection of Montgomery Road and Meadowridge Road was reconstructed to make MD 103 the through route instead of Montgomery Road. MD 103's interchange with MD 100 was completed in 1998 when MD 100 opened from MD 104 to I-95.

The intersection between MD 103 and Old Columbia Pike in Ellicott City was widened from 2022 to 2024. One right lane was added on westbound MD 103 for traffic headed onto Old Columbia Pike. A second left turn lane was added on southbound Old Columbia Pike, along with bike lanes and a center turn lane.

== Junction list ==
County	Location	mi	km	Destinations	Notes
Howard	Ellicott City	0.00	0.00	St. Johns Lane north	Western terminus
Howard	Ellicott City	0.15	0.24	US 29 (Columbia Pike) – Columbia, Baltimore	US 29 Exit 23
Howard	Ellicott City	0.15	0.24	Old Columbia Pike east – Ellicott City Historic District	Old MD 987, decommissioned in 1995
Howard	Ellicott City	0.70	1.13	Long Gate Parkway south to MD 100 east	
Howard	Ellicott City	2.04	3.28	MD 104 south (Waterloo Road) / South Haven Drive east	Northern terminus of MD 104
Howard	Elkridge	3.84	6.18	Montgomery Road east / Brightfield Road west	Montgomery Road east is old alignment of MD 103
Howard	Elkridge	4.23	6.81	MD 100 – Ellicott City, Glen Burnie	MD 100 Exit 4
Howard	Dorsey	6.29	10.12	US 1 (Washington Boulevard)	
Howard	Dorsey	6.29	10.12	Dorsey Road east / Dorsey Run Road west	Traffic realigned for Dorsey Run Road, which runs south parallel to US 1
Anne Arundel	Hanover	7.83	12.60	Coca-Cola Drive to MD 100	Unsigned MD 100M
Anne Arundel	Hanover	8.29	13.34	Parkway Drive South	Eastern terminus
1.000 mi = 1.609 km; 1.000 km = 0.621 mi

== Auxiliary routes ==
- MD 103A is the designation for the 0.11-mile (0.18 km) segment of Montgomery Road between US 1 and Old Washington Road in Elkridge.
- MD 103C is the designation for the unnamed 0.09-mile (0.14 km) service road that serves a shopping center at MD 103's intersection with MD 104 near Ellicott City.
