= Maryland Route 104 =

State highway in Howard County, Maryland, known as Waterloo Rd

Maryland Route 104
- Waterloo Road
- Maryland Route 104 highlighted in red

Route information
- Maintained by MDSHA
- Length: 1.14 mi (1.83 km)
- Existed: 1979–present

Major junctions
- South end: MD 108 in Columbia
- MD 100 in Ellicott City
- North end: MD 103 in Ellicott City

Location
- Country: United States
- State: Maryland
- Counties: Howard

Highway system
- Maryland highway system; Interstate; US; State; Scenic Byways
← MD 103	→ MD 107

Maryland Route 104 (MD 104) is a state highway in the U.S. state of Maryland. Known as Waterloo Road, the state highway runs 1.14 miles (1.83 km) from MD 108 in Columbia north to MD 103 in Ellicott City. MD 104 connects MD 108, MD 103, and MD 100 in northeastern Howard County. The state highway was originally constructed as MD 531 in the early 1930s and became part of MD 175 in the mid-1940s. After MD 175 was rerouted through Columbia in the late 1970s, MD 104 was assigned to its present course.

== Route description ==
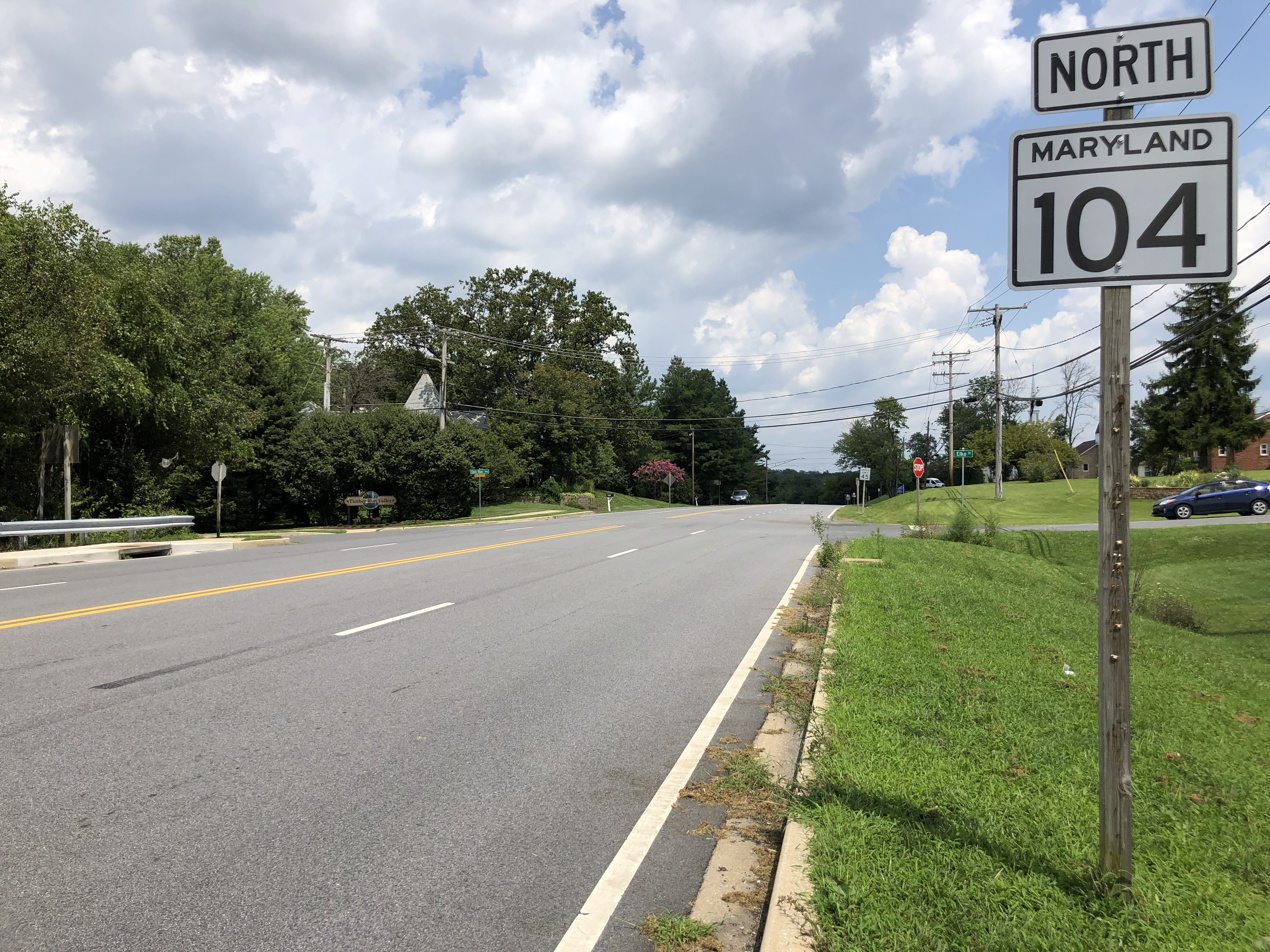
View north along MD 104 just north of MD 100 in Ellicott City

MD 104 begins at a three-way intersection with MD 108 in the hamlet of Jonestown on the northern edge of the Columbia village of Long Reach. MD 108 heads southeast as a continuation of Waterloo Road toward Jessup and west as Old Annapolis Road, which provides access to Howard High School and ramps to and from eastbound MD 100. MD 104 heads north as a four-lane undivided highway across MD 100 to a roundabout where the state highway intersects ramps to and from westbound MD 100. MD 104 reduces to two lanes and passes through a suburban area on the southern edge of Ellicott City, where the highway reaches its northern terminus at MD 103 (Montgomery Road), which heads southeast toward Elkridge and northwest toward downtown Ellicott City.

== History ==
Waterloo Road was built as a macadam road in 1932 from U.S. Route 1 (US 1) in Jessup north to MD 103 in Ellicott City; the highway was designated MD 531. MD 531 was replaced with a northern extension of MD 175 from Jessup to Ellicott City by 1946. Old Annapolis Road was designated MD 539 in 1956; that highway became part of an extended MD 108 in 1960 when US 29 was moved to Columbia Pike from Silver Spring to Ellicott City.

After MD 175 was rerouted along Little Patuxent Parkway (now named Rouse Parkway) from west of Interstate 95 (I-95) to Columbia Town Center around 1977, MD 108 was extended east to its present terminus near I-95. The portion of Waterloo Road between MD 108 and MD 103 was designated MD 104 by 1979. When MD 100 was under construction between MD 104 and I-95 in the late 1990s, a standard intersection with MD 104 served as the eastern terminus of the two-lane, disjoint section of MD 100 between US 29 and MD 104. MD 104's interchange with MD 100 was completed in 1998 concurrent with the portion of the freeway from MD 104 to I-95.

== Junction list ==
The entire route is in Howard County.

Location	mi	km	Destinations	Notes
Columbia	0.00	0.00	MD 108 (Old Annapolis Road/Waterloo Road) to MD 100 east – Jessup, Glen Burnie	Southern terminus
Ellicott City	0.16	0.26	MD 100 west – Ellicott City	Exit 2 (MD 100); access to and from westbound MD 100; roundabout
Ellicott City	1.14	1.83	MD 103 (Montgomery Road) – Downtown Ellicott City, Elkridge	Northern terminus
1.000 mi = 1.609 km; 1.000 km = 0.621 mi: Incomplete access

== Auxiliary route ==
MD 104A is the designation for the 0.16-mile (0.26 km) section of Oak Run Way between MD 104 and the residential subdivision the street serves immediately north of MD 104's interchange with MD 100.
