= Baltimore Outer Beltway =

The Baltimore Outer Beltway was a proposed freeway that would encircle parts of the Greater Baltimore area.

Parts of it have been built as the following roads:

- Maryland Route 100, 22.1 miles (35.6 km)
- US 29, 4 miles (6.4 km)
- Maryland Route 43, 5.5 miles (8.9 km)
