= Baltimore Harbor Light =

Lighthouse in Maryland, United States

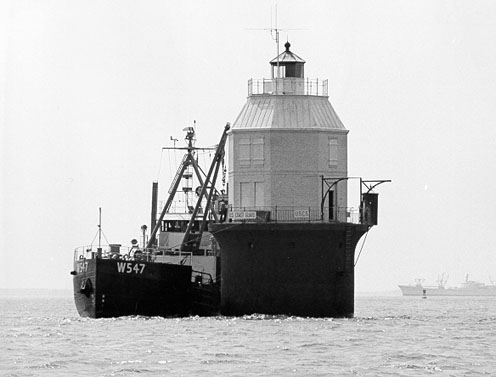
- Baltimore Light being fitted with a radioisotope thermoelectric generator on May 20, 1964, making it the first and only nuclear-powered lighthouse in the United States. In the background is the NS Savannah, the first nuclear-powered merchant vessel.
- Location: Entrance to the Magothy River, Chesapeake Bay, Maryland
- Coordinates: 39.05919°N 76.399°W

Tower
- Foundation: Pneumatic caisson sunk into seabed
- Construction: Brick
- Automated: 1964
- Shape: Octagonal
- Markings: White with brown base
- Heritage: National Register of Historic Places listed place
- Fog signal: none

Light
- First lit: 1908
- Focal height: 52 ft (16 m)
- Lens: Fifth order Fresnel lens
- Range: White 7 nautical miles (13 km; 8.1 mi); Red 5 nautical miles (9.3 km; 5.8 mi)
- Characteristic: Flashing white 2.5 sec, with one red sector
- Baltimore Light Station
- U.S. National Register of Historic Places
- Nearest city: Gibson Island, Maryland
- Area: less than one acre
- Built: 1908
- Built by: Flaherty, William H.; Lande, Frederick Martin, et al
- MPS: Light Stations of the United States MPS
- NRHP reference No.: 02001417
- Added to NRHP: December 2, 2002

The Baltimore Harbor Light, officially Baltimore Light and historically Baltimore Harbor Lighthouse is a privately owned caisson lighthouse in the Chesapeake Bay in Maryland. First lit in 1908, it sits at the mouth of the Magothy River, marking the channel which leads northwest to the opening of the Patapsco River, which then leads into the Baltimore harbor. The light is located adjacent to the mouth of the Magothy River. At the time of its construction, it was the world's tallest caisson lighthouse due to the deep sediment of its location. It was the world's first nuclear powered lighthouse for a brief time in the 1960s.

== History ==
Although a lighthouse had been requested at the site since 1890, it was not until 1904 that construction actually began. In October of that year a violent storm struck the construction site, upturning the caisson and sending it to the bottom of the Bay. The contractor defaulted on the work, and it was not until late in 1905 that construction could resume. The lens was finally installed and the light lit in 1908. It was the last lighthouse to be constructed on the Chesapeake.

In May 1964, the Baltimore Light became the world's first, and only American lighthouse, powered by nuclear power, as a test of the SNAP-7B 60 Watt radioisotope thermoelectric generator. One year later the RTG was removed and a conventional electric generator was installed. Currently the lighthouse is solar-powered.

The structure was added to the National Register of Historic Places as Baltimore Light Station on December 2, 2002.

In June 2006, Baltimore Light was sold at auction to private owners by the General Services Administration for $260,000; the U.S. Coast Guard maintains rights to operate a light on the structure. The new owner, BHL, LLC of Annapolis, was a partnership of private citizens, 4 couples. The terms of sale dictate that the Coast Guard be granted access to the lighthouse for occasional checkups on the still-active light. BHL created a website with history and other information about the lighthouse.
