= Northeast High School (Pasadena, Maryland) =

Location
- 1121 Duvall Highway; Pasadena, Maryland 21122; United States; 39°8′40″N 76°31′44″W

Information
- Type: Public high school
- Established: 1964; 62 years ago
- School district: Anne Arundel County Public Schools
- NCES School ID: 240024000575
- Principal: Douglas Schreiber
- Teaching staff: 79 FTE (2022-23)
- Grades: 9–12
- Gender: Co-educational
- Enrollment: 1,390 (2022-23)
- Student to teacher ratio: 17.59 (2022-23)
- Campus type: Suburban
- Colors: Black and gold
- Mascot: Eagle
- Rival: Chesapeake High School
- Publication: Eaglegram
- Newspaper: Eagle's Revenge
- Website: www.northeasthigh.org

Northeast High School is a public high school in unincorporated northeastern Anne Arundel County, Maryland, United States. The school opened in 1964 and serves as one of two high schools for the town of Pasadena, which is fifteen miles south of Baltimore. The school is situated in Pasadena's eastern coastal area community, known as Riveria Beach, along the south and west shores of the outer Patapsco River near the Baltimore Harbor and Seaport where it flows into the Chesapeake Bay on its western shore.

The school newsletter is called the "Eaglegram" and the school newspaper is called the "Eagle's Revenge".

== History ==
Northeast High School opened in 1964. In 1992 and from 2012 to 2014 the building was refurbished.

== Notable alumni ==
- Glynn Davis, baseball player
