= Magothy River =

Location
- Country: United States
- State: Maryland
- District: Anne Arundel County
- City: Pasadena, MD, Lake Shore, MD, Cape St. Claire, MD, Gibson Island, MD

Physical characteristics
- Source: Woodland Estates Way pond
  - location: Chartwell, Maryland, United States
  - coordinates: 39°6′15″N 76°36′13″W
  - elevation: 130 ft (40 m)
- Mouth: Chesapeake Bay
  - location: Maryland, United States
  - coordinates: 39°3′22″N 76°26′4″W
  - elevation: 0 ft (0 m)
- Length: 12.1 mi (19.5 km)
- Basin size: 44 mi^{2} (110 km^{2})

The Magothy River runs 12.1 miles (19.5 km) through Anne Arundel County in the U.S. state of Maryland. It is located south of the Patapsco River and north of the Severn River. There are two public park paddling access points, Beachwood Park on the north shore a half mile east of the Magothy Bridge Road bridge, and Spriggs Farm Park off Bayberry Drive, on the south shore two miles west of the Magothy's mouth. Both are Anne Arundel County parks.

== Description ==
The Magothy's tidal estuary portion extends for eight miles from its mouth at the Chesapeake Bay south of Gibson Island. The tidal Magothy reaches a maximum width of 2.5 miles including Sillery Bay and Tar Cove (formerly Tar Coal Cove) adjoining Gibson Island on the west. The source of its four-mile non-tidal portion is a small pond on Woodland Estates Way in Chartwell, just west of Elvaton Park, four miles north of Millersville. It is well known among recreational boaters for the popular anchorage north of Dobbins Island. Its navigable tidal portion is crossed by one bridge, located on Magothy Bridge Road in Pasadena. Its upper, nontidal portion is dammed at MD 648 (Baltimore-Annapolis Boulevard) to form Lake Waterford at the site of an old mill dam. Some of the creeks on its south shore drain highly developed portions of Severna Park and Arnold, especially North Cypress Creek which drains much of the Park Plaza and Giant shopping centers along Ritchie Highway north of McKinsey Road.

The Baltimore Light Station is located in the Chesapeake two miles east of the mouth of the river.

== Watershed ==
Over six miles of Chesapeake shoreline from Sandy Point to the non-Magothy east side of Gibson Island, including the Little Magothy River, all well beyond the official and actual mouth of the Magothy (325 meters south of the southern tip of Gibson Island), are not in the Magothy drainage basin but are often included in county and state government studies of the watershed. These studies outline a watershed area (including the water surface) of 44 square miles (110 km^{2}), or 35 square miles (91 km^{2}) of land, with a total watershed area is 20% water.

== Etymology ==
The river was labeled "Magoty River" on a 1663 map and "Maggotty River" on a 1690 map, either an Indian phrase "mega, pi-meguke," which means a place without trees or a wide plain, or derived from "maggot", which in older English usage meant a fantastic notion or a caprice.

== Magothy River Association ==
In 1946, the Magothy River Association (MRA) was formed when the U.S. Naval Academy wanted to use the peninsula of Sandy Point for a Naval Aeoranautic Training base. Sandy Point was part of a farm belonging to William Labrot. Charles L. Pumphrey and Bill Labrot testified before a Senate Committee in the summer of 1945 against such a use as they, Navy men in World War I, felt that this installation would be detrimental to the beauty and tranquility of the Bay area. William Labrot gave the land in question to the state on condition that it be a dedicated park, and with the participation of local residents, Charles L. Pumphrey formed and was the first President of the Magothy River Assoc. This was one of the first efforts of "environmentalism" long before the word came into common usage. Today this organization concentrates on issues concerning land use, water quality monitoring, fish habitat and reforestation programs. Volunteer scientific divers were organized in 1998 and assist with the restoration and management of underwater grasses and oyster habitats.

== Water quality ==
The aquatic health of the Magothy River has been declining in recent years. In 2008 the river was given a health rating of 30%, down from 42% in 2007 and 65% in 2004. The river's overall health score was determined by three contributing factors: underwater grasses, water clarity, and dissolved oxygen. The Magothy scored below par in all three of these categories, the worst of which being the underwater grasses. The Magothy had 90 acres (0.36 km^{2}) of underwater grass mapped in 2008, achieving only 15% of the goal of 579 acres (2.34 km^{2}). The water clarity status in 2008 was only slightly better than SAV status, with 19% of measurements exceeding the 0.97 meter depth which allows underwater grasses enough sunlight to grow, down from 44% in 2007. The Magothy scored the best in 2008 for dissolved oxygen; 55% of measurements exceeded its goal of 5 milligrams per liter, down from 69% in 2007.

== Creeks and tidal coves ==
Almost all of the creeks and tidal coves on the Magothy are named, partly as the result of a project started in 2001 by the Magothy River Association. They are shown on a map produced as part of that project, and the major ones are shown on the USGS topographic map.

There are nine non-tidal streams listed below along the Upper Magothy River. None of them are navigable except for short portions near the Magothy of those below Lake Waterford, and none are named on any published maps except the map produced by the Magothy River Association. All names below are historical except where noted.

- Upper Magothy, both tidal and non-tidal

North shore, upriver to downriver:

- Muddy Run
- Bailys Branch
- Brookfield Branch (nearest community)
- Beachwood Branch (nearest community)
- Indian Village Branch (nearest community; mouth hard to see)

South shore, upriver to downriver:

- Kinder Branch (starts in Kinder Park, drains into Lake Waterford)
- Rouses Branch (also starts in Kinder Park and drains into Lake Waterford)
- Nannys Creek (its mouth is hard to see)

From Cockey and Old Man Creeks downriver, most of the creeks and coves are at least partly tidal and navigable. Thus, most of them have names on published maps and have been named for a longer period of time.

On the north shore, from upriver to downriver, the navigable, named creeks and tidal ponds are:

- Cockey Creek
- Ross Cove
- Blackhole Creek
- Broad Creek
- Park Lake
- Park Creek
- Dobbins Pond
- Sillery Bay
- Long Cove
- Grays Creek
- Jubbs Creek (north fork of Grays Creek)
- Tar Cove (formerly Tar Coal Cove)
- Hunters Harbor
- Magothy Narrows
- Cornfield Creek
- James Pond
- Inner Harbor
- Redhouse Cove
- Cooleys Pond

On the south shore, from upriver to downriver, the navigable, named creeks and tidal ponds are:

- Old Man Creek
- Tar Hill Cove
- Cattail Creek (includes Cold Spring Cove)
- Cypress Creek (including North Cypress Creek and Browns Cove)
- Dividing Creek (includes Buckinghams Cove)
- Mill Creek
- Spriggs Pond
- Bohdal Pond
- Forked Creek (includes Cool Spring Cove)
- Scheides Cove
- Lake Placid
- Deep Creek

== See also ==
- List of Maryland rivers
