= Chesapeake High School (Pasadena, Maryland) =

Location
- 4798 Mountain Road; Pasadena, Maryland; United States; 39°6′38″N 76°27′43″W

Information
- Type: Public high school
- Established: 1976; 50 years ago
- School district: Anne Arundel County Public Schools
- NCES School ID: 240006000058
- Principal: John Yore
- Teaching staff: 82.15 FTE (2022-23)
- Grades: 9–12
- Gender: Co-educational
- Enrollment: 1,419 (2022-23)
- Student to teacher ratio: 17.27 (2022-23)
- Campus: Suburban
- Colors: School: Blue and gold Athletics: Carolina blue, navy blue, and white
- Mascot: Cougar
- Rival: Northeast High School
- Website: chesapeakehighcougars.org

Chesapeake High School (CHS) is a public high school in Pasadena, Maryland. It is one of two public high schools in Pasadena, the other being Northeast High School.

The school serves grades 9–12 in the local feeder system, encompassing Chesapeake Bay Middle School and the respective five elementary schools that feed into it. The school has two floors and includes a football field, several soccer and other athletic fields, and a variety of gymnasiums, including a smaller dance studio.

== History ==
Before Chesapeake High School was opened, Northeast High School was the only high school in Pasadena. By the 1970's, overcrowding had become a large enough problem at Northeast to warrant the establishment of a second high school in the town. Chesapeake High School was opened in 1976, bisecting Pasadena's high school enrollment.

In October 2007, Chesapeake High School was listed as one of four high schools in Anne Arundel County that had outbreaks of staph infections. Twenty-eight cases of the infection have also been reported at Severna Park High School, Glen Burnie High School, and Old Mill High School.

In February 2008, Chesapeake parents began an organization (CEEDSS) to protest a special education program, known as CRP or the Chesapeake Regional Program, that has been in the school since 1990, but according to parents has been disruptive to education and concealed by administration.

== Students ==
Chesapeake High School's feeder area is the same as Chesapeake Bay Middle School's, since there is no other nearby middle school. The feeder elementary schools are Lake Shore, Pasadena, Bodkin, Jacobsville, and Fort Smallwood. In addition to including the entire Lake Shore region of Pasadena, Chesapeake's attendance area also covers Gibson Island and the Riverdale neighborhood within Severna Park. During the 2019–2020 school year, the racial makeup of Chesapeake High School's 1,388 students was 83.6% white, 5.9% Hispanic, 4.1% Black or African American, 1.9% Asian, and 3.9% two or more races. 14% of students qualified for free and reduced meals.

== Academic programs ==
- The school has an Advanced Placement (AP) program that includes Statistics, Calculus, Environmental Science, Chemistry, Biology, Physics, Psychology, United States History, World History, European History, United States Government & Politics, English Language & Composition, English Literature & Composition, Music Theory, Art, Computer Science, and many more.
- Chesapeake High School operates in cooperation with the Center of Applied Technology North to provide career training.
- Chesapeake is the home of the ED Regional program, the special education center for northern Anne Arundel County including Intensity-V, Inclusion-V, and the Hannah More Program.

== Athletics ==
Sports teams at Chesapeake, with both varsity and junior varsity teams, are all part of the Maryland Public Secondary Schools Athletic Association. They include:

- Baseball
- Men's basketball
- Women's basketball
- Cheerleading
- Cross country
- Field hockey
- Football
- Golf
- Indoor track and field
- Men's lacrosse
- Women's lacrosse
- Softball
- Swimming
- Men's soccer
- Women's soccer
- Tennis
- Track and field
- Volleyball
- Wrestling

Chesapeake has won several state championships including three baseball (1997, 2014, and 2022), seven softball (1988, 1990, 1991, 1992, 1993, 2007 and 2008), three wrestling (1981, 2000, and 2002), one marching band (2019) and one soccer championship (1998).

== Notable alumni ==
- Frederick H. Bealefeld III, former Police Commissioner of the Baltimore Police Department
- Brandi Burkhardt, actress
- Lauren Gibson, softball player for the U.S. national team
- Nic Kipke, representative in the Maryland House of Delegates
- Victoria L. Schade, representative in the Maryland House of Delegates
