= Orchard Beach, Maryland =

Unincorporated community in Maryland, United States

- Unincorporated community
- Location within the state of Maryland Orchard Beach (the United States)
- Coordinates: 39°10′14″N 76°31′36″W
- Country: United States
- State: Maryland
- County: Anne Arundel
- Time zone: UTC-5 (Eastern (EST))
  - Summer (DST): UTC-4 (EDT)
- ZIP codes: 21226

Orchard Beach is an unincorporated community in Anne Arundel County, Maryland, United States. The community lies outside the Baltimore Beltway, approximately four miles from its nearest interchange. It lies on a peninsula that has about two miles of shoreline and about a dozen named streets.
