= Gibson Island (Maryland) =

Unincorporated community in Maryland, United States

Gibson Island, Maryland
- Unincorporated community
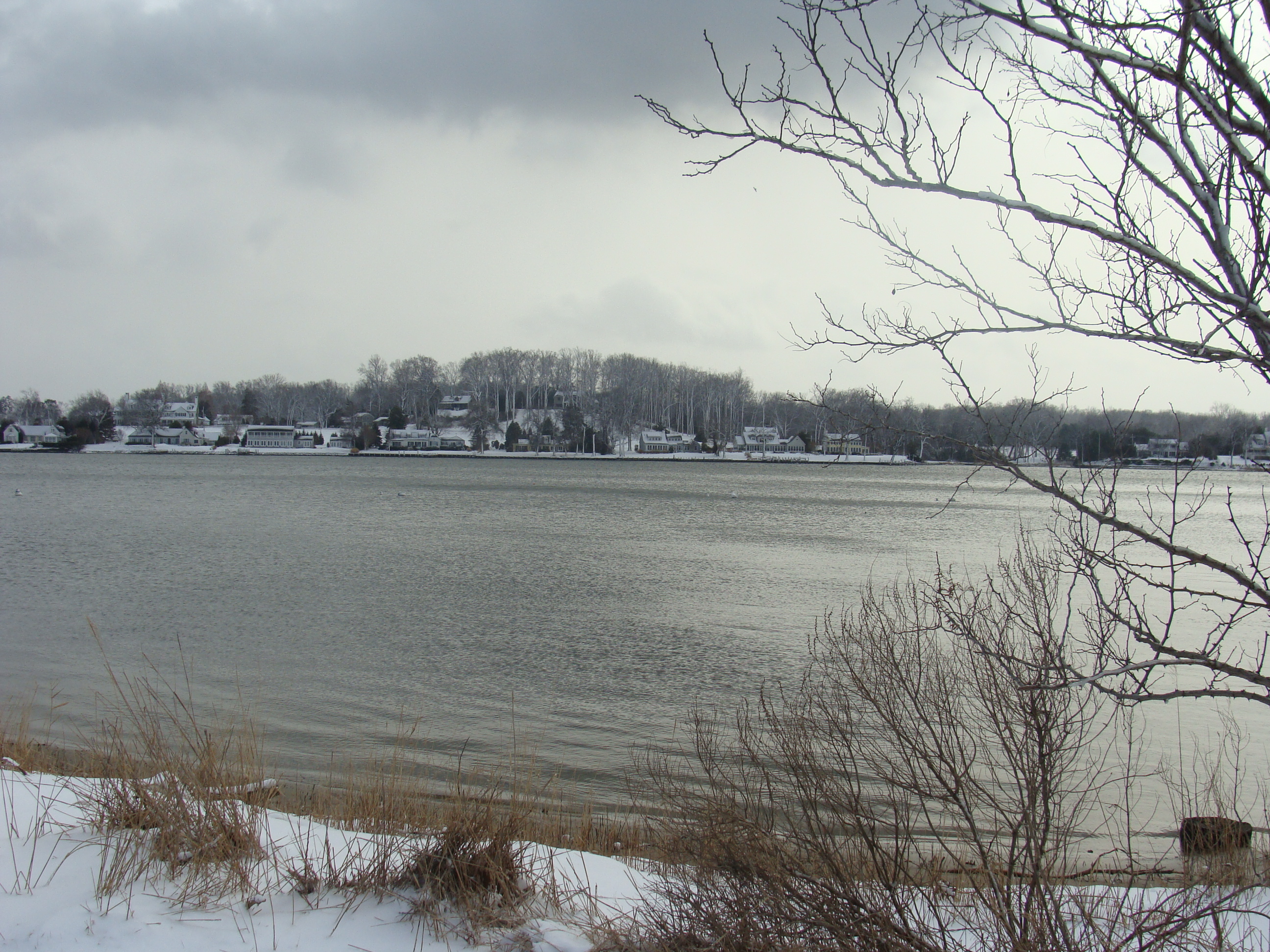
- Gibson Island in late winter, as seen from the mainland

- Location within the state of Maryland Gibson Island (the United States)
- Coordinates: 39°04′27″N 76°25′26″W
- Country: United States
- State: Maryland
- County: Anne Arundel
- Time zone: UTC-5 (Eastern (EST))
  - Summer (DST): UTC-4 (EDT)
- ZIP code: 21056
- GNIS feature ID: 590298

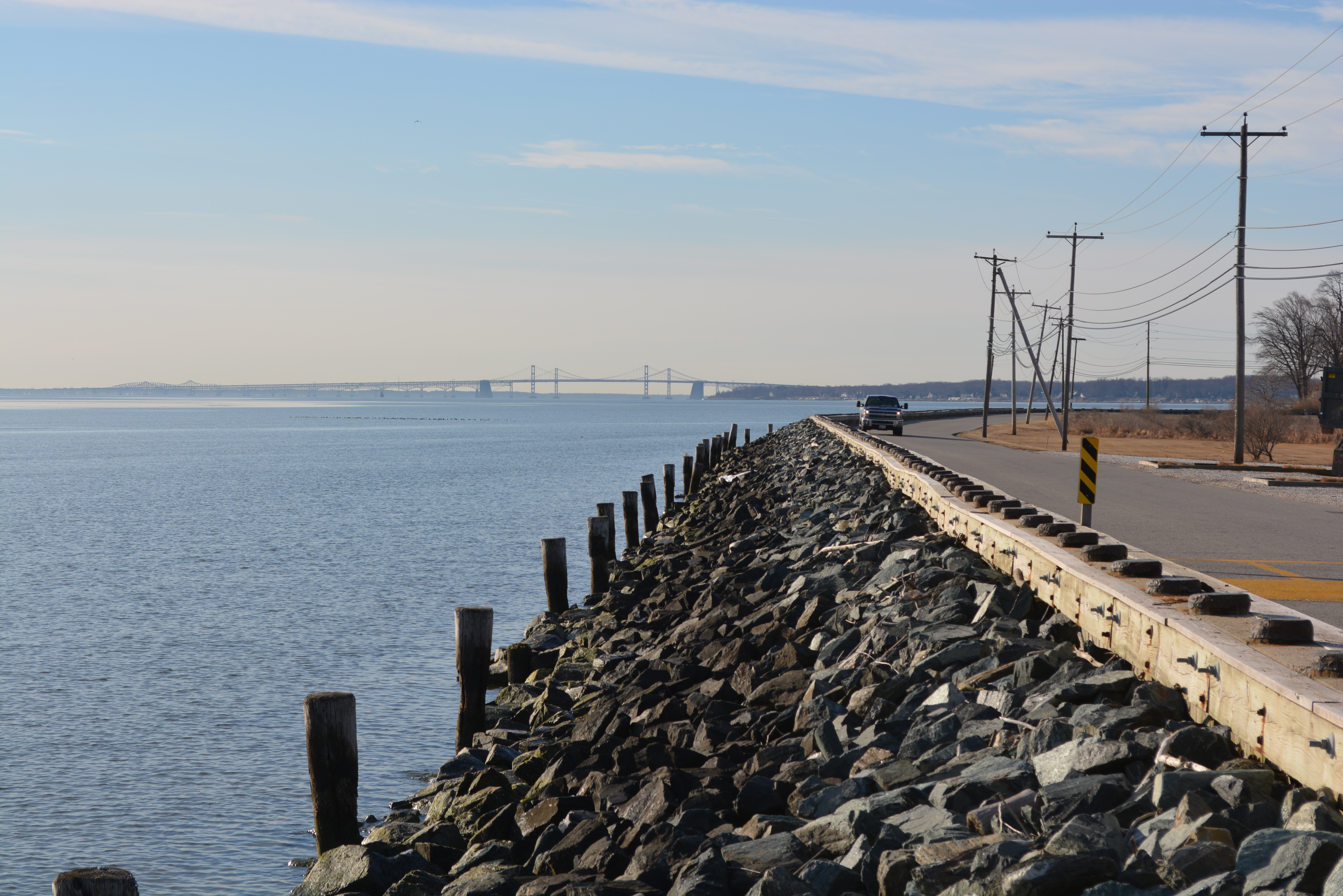
Gibson Island's gated causeway. The Chesapeake Bay Bridge is visible in the background.

Gibson Island is an island and unincorporated community on the western shore of the Chesapeake Bay. It is part of Anne Arundel County, Maryland, United States and is the eastern terminus of Maryland Route 177. It is connected by a causeway to Pasadena, Maryland. The two locations do not share a ZIP code.

== History ==
Gibson Island's history includes its use as a summer residence by Native Americans in the 17th century. Captain John Smith sailed past it in his voyage up the Chesapeake Bay in 1608. Land grants began issue around the 1680s. In the early 1900s, W. Stuart Symington Jr. (1871–1926) bought the island's land (including three existing island farms) with his brother Thomas, to develop the island into a residential community. One of the early owners was a man named Gibson, after whom the island is named.

The Symingtons, upon the advice of Edward H. Bouton, the developer of the Roland Park and Guilford neighborhoods in Baltimore, hired landscape architect Frederick Law Olmsted Jr. to create a master plan for the island. The Symington brothers set certain areas aside for community facilities and divided the remaining land into building lots offered for sale through the Gibson Island Company, now known as the Gibson Island Corporation. In 1925, the first deed and agreement was adopted and recorded. From that time to the present, the corporation has had its own real estate department specifically handling the listing and selling of island properties.

The Great Depression halted rapid development of the island. An 18-hole Charles B. Macdonald designed golf course constructed in the 1920s was forced to downsize to nine holes, where it remains to this day. In 1936, corporation ownership was reorganized, giving greater control to island homeowners. This change led to a greater emphasis on maintaining the island's natural environment, with about two-thirds of its land set aside for recreation, forestry and open space.

Today, home prices on the island start at $US 1 million-plus, with the 2023 median sale price being $2,525,000. This makes Gibson Island the most expensive zip code in Maryland and the 45th most expensive zip code in the country. Today, Gibson Island is a gated community run by the Gibson Island Corporation, along with the Gibson Island Club, limiting access to the island and its facilities to residents or those with a formal reason for visiting. Many residents of the island are seasonal residents who reside primarily in Washington, D.C. or Baltimore. Features of the island include a yacht club, golf, tennis, skeet shooting, a post office, a historical society, and an Episcopal church.

== Public safety ==
The residents of the island employ a Special Police force through the corporation. The members of the force are sworn law enforcement officers, who have full law enforcement authority while working on the island. There have been reports over the years of sworn officers from the Anne Arundel County Police being stopped and questioned by the guards at the entrance to the island. In 2001, an inquiry by the Maryland State Police was opened into allegations of misconduct by the island's special police force. While the state police investigation found evidence of illegal traffic stops and uniform violations, the investigation was dropped after a new security staff passed a surprise inspection.

== Education ==
Although there are few families with children on Gibson Island and 100% of the children on the island are enrolled in private school, Gibson Island belongs to the Anne Arundel County Public Schools district. Children living on Gibson Island would hypothetically attend Bodkin Elementary School, Chesapeake Bay Middle School, and Chesapeake High School if they attended public schools.

== Notable person ==
- Thomas M. Watlington (1904–1990), US Army major general, lived on Gibson Island during retirement
