= Pasadena, Maryland =

- Census-designated place
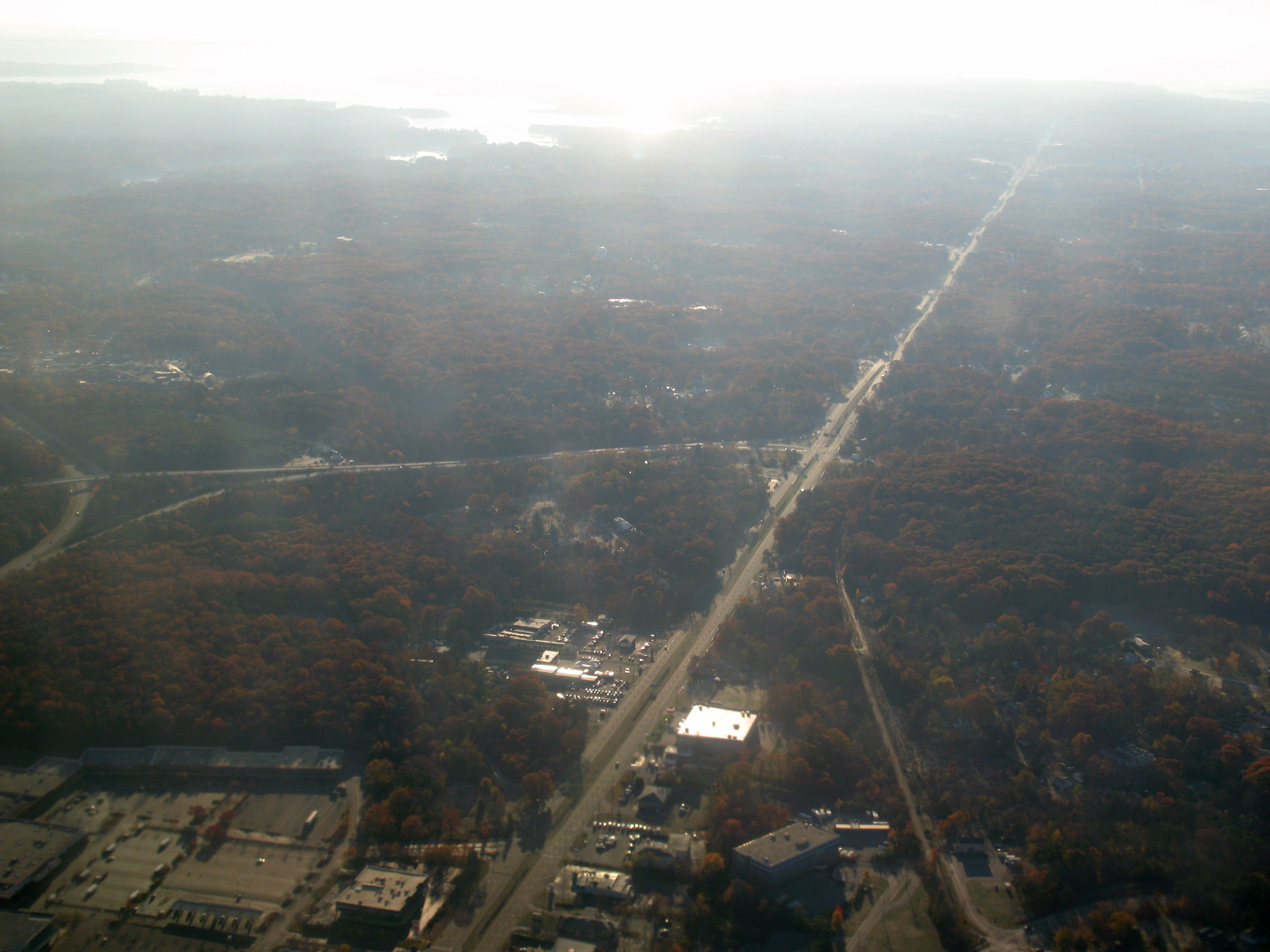
- Maryland Route 2 in Pasadena from the air

- Location of Pasadena in Maryland
- Coordinates: 39°6′46.11″N 76°33′6.74″W
- Country: United States
- State: Maryland
- County: Anne Arundel

Area
  - Total: 16.11 sq mi (41.73 km^{2})
  - Land: 14.93 sq mi (38.66 km^{2})
  - Water: 1.19 sq mi (3.07 km^{2}) 7.31%
- Elevation: 79 ft (24 m)

Population (2020)
  - Total: 32,979
  - Density: 2,209.4/sq mi (853.04/km^{2})
- Time zone: UTC−5 (EST)
  - Summer (DST): UTC−4 (EDT)
- ZIP Code: 21122
- Area codes: 410, 443, 667
- FIPS code: 24-60475
- GNIS feature ID: 0590983

Pasadena is a census-designated place (CDP) in Anne Arundel County, Maryland, United States. The population was 24,287 at the 2010 census.

The areas of Lake Shore, Riviera Beach and Pasadena are collectively referred to as Pasadena by residents. As all areas are governed by Anne Arundel County, there is no distinction in services such as fire, police, or public schools. All three areas are encompassed by the 21122 zip code. The collective area population was at 56,441 at the 2010 census.

== Geography ==
Pasadena is located at 39°6′46″N 76°33′7″W (39.112809, −76.551871) in northern Anne Arundel County. It is bordered to the north by the city of Baltimore, to the east by the tidal Patapsco River and by Riviera Beach, to the southeast by Lake Shore, to the south by Severna Park, and to the west by Glen Burnie. The original community of Pasadena, shown on USGS topographic maps at the intersection of Pasadena Road and Governor Ritchie Highway (Maryland Route 2), is now assigned by the U.S. Census Bureau to the Severna Park census-designated place, south of the border for the Pasadena CDP, which itself is centered along Mountain Road (Maryland Route 177) and includes the neighborhoods of Ashburn and Green Haven, and extends north along the Marley Neck peninsula all the way to the Baltimore city line.

According to the United States Census Bureau, the CDP has a total area of 16.1 square miles (41.7 km^{2}). 14.9 square miles (38.7 km^{2}) of it is land, and 1.2 square miles (3.1 km^{2}) of it (7.31%) is water.

== Demographics ==
Historical population
Census	Pop.	Note	%±
2010	24,287		—
2020	32,979		35.8%
U.S. Decennial Census

=== 2020 census ===
As of the 2020 census, Pasadena had a population of 32,979. The median age was 36.1 years. 22.3% of residents were under the age of 18 and 10.8% were 65 years of age or older. For every 100 females there were 97.1 males, and for every 100 females age 18 and over there were 94.9 males age 18 and over.

100.0% of residents lived in urban areas, while 0.0% lived in rural areas.

There were 12,050 households in Pasadena, of which 35.0% had children under the age of 18 living in them. Of all households, 55.3% were married-couple households, 15.4% were households with a male householder and no spouse or partner present, and 20.9% were households with a female householder and no spouse or partner present. About 19.4% of all households were made up of individuals and 5.4% had someone living alone who was 65 years of age or older.

There were 12,430 housing units, of which 3.1% were vacant. The homeowner vacancy rate was 0.8% and the rental vacancy rate was 4.1%.

Racial composition as of the 2020 census
Race	Number	Percent
White	22,950	69.6%
Black or African American	4,867	14.8%
American Indian and Alaska Native	125	0.4%
Asian	1,336	4.1%
Native Hawaiian and Other Pacific Islander	26	0.1%
Some other race	904	2.7%
Two or more races	2,771	8.4%
Hispanic or Latino (of any race)	2,271	6.9%

=== 2010 census ===
As of the census of 2010, there were 24,287 people, 8,546 households, and 6,435 families residing in the CDP. The population density was 1,632.0 inhabitants per square mile (630.1/km^{2}). There were 8,911 housing units at an average density of 611.9 per square mile (236.3/km^{2}). The racial makeup of the CDP was 86.2% White, 6.9% African American, 0.3% Native American, 2.6% Asian, 0.1% Pacific Islander, 1.6% from other races, and 2.3% from two or more races. Hispanic or Latino people of any race were 4.3% of the population.

There were 8,546 households, out of which 33.6% had children under the age of 18 living with them, 58.6% were married couples living together, 11.3% had a female householder with no husband present, and 24.7% were non-families. 17.8% of all households were made up of individuals, and 4.2% had someone living alone who was 65 years of age or older. The average household size was 2.84 and the average family size was 3.21.

In the CDP, the population was spread out, with 24.1% under the age of 18, 7.4% from 18 to 24, 30.2% from 25 to 44, 28.4% from 45 to 64, and 8.5% who were 65 years of age or older. The median age was 36.7 years. For every 100 females, there were 98.2 males.

The median income for a household in the CDP was $88,035, and the median income for a family was $95,025. Males had a median income of $57,108 versus $49,347 for females. The per capita income for the CDP was $34,498. About 2.3% of families and 4.7% of the population were below the poverty line, including 6.1% of those under age 18 and 7.8% of those age 65 or over.

== Notable people ==
- Brandi Burkhardt, television, film and Broadway actress, vocalist and beauty queen
- Ronnie Dove, pop star during the 1960s, country singer in the 1970s
- Dan Duquette, former general manager of the Baltimore Orioles
- John R. Leopold, former Anne Arundel County Executive
- Mike Newton, pro football player
- Nilah Magruder, award-winning illustrator

== Schools and education ==
=== Public schools ===
- High schools
  - Chesapeake Senior High School
  - Northeast Senior High School
- Middle schools
  - Chesapeake Bay Middle School
  - Northeast Middle School (formerly George Fox Middle School)
- Elementary schools
  - Bodkin Elementary
  - Fort Smallwood Elementary School
  - High Point Elementary School
  - Jacobsville Elementary School
  - Lake Shore Elementary School
  - Pasadena Elementary School
  - Riviera Beach Elementary School
  - Solley Elementary School
  - Sunset Elementary School

== Libraries ==
- Mountain Road Library
- Riviera Beach Library

== Parks and recreation ==
- Beachwood Park
- Bodkin Park
- Downs Park
- Fort Smallwood Park
- Lake Waterford Park
- Sunset Park
- Tick Neck Park
- Weinburg Park
