= Riviera Beach, Maryland =

- Census-designated place
- Maryland State Route 173 in Riviera Beach, August 2016
- Motto: Where bay, river, and creek meet
- Location of Riviera Beach, Maryland
- Coordinates: 39°9′43″N 76°31′5″W
- Country: United States
- State: Maryland
- County: Anne Arundel

Area
  - Total: 3.21 sq mi (8.31 km^{2})
  - Land: 2.63 sq mi (6.81 km^{2})
  - Water: 0.58 sq mi (1.49 km^{2})
- Elevation: 9.8 ft (3 m)

Population (2020)
  - Total: 12,384
  - Density: 4,708.0/sq mi (1,817.78/km^{2})
- Time zone: UTC−5 (Eastern (EST))
  - Summer (DST): UTC−4 (EDT)
- ZIP codes: 21122-21123
- Area code: 410
- FIPS code: 24-66850
- GNIS feature ID: 0591144

Riviera Beach is a census-designated place in Anne Arundel County, Maryland, United States. The population was 12,677 at the 2010 U.S. census.

== History ==
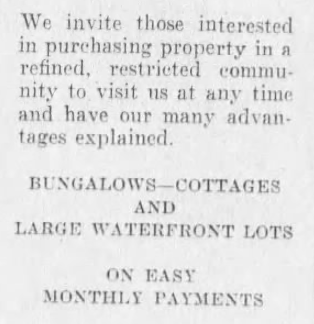
1928 Baltimore Sun advertisement for racially restricted houses in Riviera Beach.

Prior to the passage of the Fair Housing Act of 1968, racially restrictive covenants were used in Maryland to exclude African-Americans and other minorities. A July 8, 1928 advertisement in the Baltimore Sun for houses in Riviera Beach described the community as a "refined, restricted" neighborhood.

== Geography ==
Riviera Beach is located at 39°09′43″N 76°31′05″W, on the southwest shore of the tidal Patapsco River, the waterway which forms Baltimore's harbor to the northwest. The community is bounded by two tidal inlets of the Patapsco, Rock Creek to the southeast and Stoney Creek to the northwest.

According to the United States Census Bureau, the CDP has a total area of 3.2 square miles (8.3 km^{2}), of which 2.6 square miles (6.8 km^{2}) is land and 0.58 square miles (1.5 km^{2}), or 17.96%, is water.

== Demographics ==
Historical population
Census	Pop.	Note	%±
1950	1,849		—
1960	4,902		165.1%
1970	7,464		52.3%
1980	8,812		18.1%
1990	11,376		29.1%
2000	12,695		11.6%
2010	12,677		−0.1%
2020	12,384		−2.3%
U.S. Decennial Census

=== 2020 census ===
As of the 2020 census, Riviera Beach had a population of 12,384. The median age was 38.6 years. 21.6% of residents were under the age of 18 and 14.4% of residents were 65 years of age or older. For every 100 females there were 94.3 males, and for every 100 females age 18 and over there were 91.7 males age 18 and over.

100.0% of residents lived in urban areas, while 0.0% lived in rural areas.

There were 4,779 households in Riviera Beach, of which 31.6% had children under the age of 18 living in them. Of all households, 46.8% were married-couple households, 17.4% were households with a male householder and no spouse or partner present, and 25.8% were households with a female householder and no spouse or partner present. About 24.0% of all households were made up of individuals and 9.1% had someone living alone who was 65 years of age or older.

There were 5,023 housing units, of which 4.9% were vacant. The homeowner vacancy rate was 1.1% and the rental vacancy rate was 5.6%.

Racial composition as of the 2020 census
Race	Number	Percent
White	10,248	82.8%
Black or African American	720	5.8%
American Indian and Alaska Native	37	0.3%
Asian	230	1.9%
Native Hawaiian and Other Pacific Islander	12	0.1%
Some other race	218	1.8%
Two or more races	919	7.4%
Hispanic or Latino (of any race)	571	4.6%

=== 2010 census ===
As of the 2010 census, there were 12,677 people, 4,817 households, and 3,373 families residing in the CDP. The population density was 4,759.8 inhabitants per square mile (1,837.8/km^{2}). There were 5,098 housing units at an average density of 1,855.9 per square mile (716.6/km^{2}). The racial makeup of the CDP was 91.6% White, 4.1% African American, 0.2% Native American, 1.1% Asian, 0.00% Pacific Islander, 0.7% from other races, and 2.3% from two or more races. Hispanic or Latino of any race were 2.8% of the population.

There were 2,100 households, out of which 29.9% had children under the age of 18 living with them, 51.9% were married couples living together, 12.5% had a female householder with no husband present, and 30% were non-families. 22.7% of all households were made up of individuals, and 7.7% had someone living alone who was 65 years of age or older. The average household size was 2.63 and the average family size was 3.08.

In the CDP, the population was spread out, with 22.8% under the age of 18, 6.0% from 18 to 24, 29.4% from 25 to 44, 27.6% from 45 to 64, and 11.9% who were 65 years of age or older. The median age was 37.3 years. For every 100 females, there were 96.3 males. For every 100 females age 18 and over, there were 93.1 males.

The median income for a household in the CDP was $79,645, and the median income for a family was $82,567. Males had a median income of $59,861 versus $44,379 for females. The per capita income for the CDP was $33,507. About 3% of families and 5.5% of the population were below the poverty line, including 6.8% of those under age 18 and 7.9% of those age 65 or over.
