= BWI Business District =

BWI Business District West Nursery, Stoney Run
- Business District
- Location within the state of Maryland BWI Business District (the United States)
- Coordinates: 39°11′26.48″N 76°40′27.99″W
- Country: United States
- State: Maryland
- City: Linthicum Heights
- City: Hanover
- Established: 1985
- Named for: Businesses and hotels surrounding BWI Airport

The BWI Business District is a neighborhood and business district in Linthicum and Hanover that features over 11,000 hotel rooms and numerous office parks and shopping centers. As the name suggests, the business district is benefited by nearby Baltimore/Washington International Airport.

The district comprises two distinct areas: West Nursery to the north of Interstate 195 and Stoney Run to the south. The West Nursery District includes the original Hotel District, the Friendship Annex of the National Security Agency, the Maryland Aviation Administration, and the National Electronics Museum. The Stoney Run District includes the BWI Amtrak/MARC Rail Station, the BWI Rental Car Return Center, and the headquarters of the Maryland Department of Transportation.

== History ==
The BWI Business District was established in 1985 along with the BWI Business Partnership. The District formalized and brought together hotels and businesses adjacent to the Baltimore/Washington International Airport, as well as federal agencies located in nearby Fort George G. Meade.

== Location ==
Located in Anne Arundel County, Maryland, the BWI Business District is to the north and west of the airport. The West Nursery District is bordered by I-195 and the Baltimore-Washington Parkway to the west, the Patapsco River to the north, Hammonds Ferry and Camp Meade Roads to the east, and Aviation Boulevard to the south. The Stoney Run District is bordered by I-195 to the north, Aviation Boulevard to the east, Dorsey Road to the south, and the Baltimore-Washington Parkway to the west.

== Businesses and organizations ==
- Allegis Group
- American Urological Association
- Booz Allen Hamilton
- Ciena
- Coca-Cola
- International Organization of Masters Mates & Pilots
- Northrop Grumman
- Raytheon
- LSG Sky Chefs
- Schmidt Baking Company
- SECU
- The Maritime Institute of Technology

== Shopping and entertainment ==
The BWI Business District includes retail and entertainment establishments as well. In the West Nursery District, Airport Square Shopping Center features a Hoyts movie theater along with a number of restaurants. The BWI Technology Park also includes eateries and retail along West Nursery Road. Additional commercial centers include Arundel Mills and Maryland Live! Casino, just south of the Stoney Run District along Arundel Mills Boulevard.

== Public transit ==
Amtrak and the MARC Train provide intercity and commuter train service to the area at the BWI Rail Station on Amtrak Way.

The Maryland Transit Administration provides Light RailLink service at the BWI Business District station on Elkridge Landing Road, along with bus service on Route 17. The BWI Trail traverses through the district as well.
