= Airport Loop =

Highways round Baltimore/Washington International Airport, USA

Airport Loop

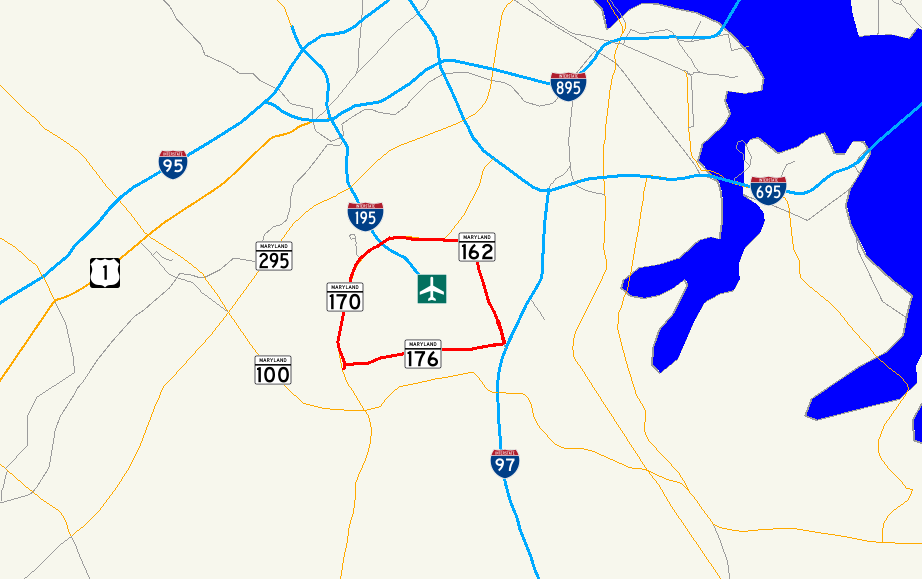

Route information
- Maintained by MDSHA
- Length: 8.44 mi (13.58 km)

Major junctions
- Loop around BWI Airport
- I-195 in Hanover; MD 170 in Linthicum; I-97 in Ferndale; MD 176 in Ferndale; MD 176 / MD 170 in Hanover

Location
- Country: United States
- State: Maryland
- Counties: Anne Arundel

Highway system
- Maryland highway system; Interstate; US; State; Scenic Byways

Airport Loop is the designation for the portions of state highways that form a circumferential highway around Baltimore/Washington International Airport (BWI Airport) in Anne Arundel County in the U.S. state of Maryland. The loop runs 8.44 miles (13.58 km) through the communities of Linthicum, Ferndale, and Hanover. Airport Loop consists of a 3.47-mile (5.58 km) section of Maryland Route 170 (MD 170) along the western and northern sides of the loop; the entire 2.31-mile (3.72 km) length of MD 162 on the eastern side of the loop; and a 2.66-mile (4.28 km) segment of MD 176 on the southern side of the loop. Airport Loop intersects Interstate 195 (I-195), which provides freeway access to the airport terminal, and is connected to I-695, I-97, and MD 100 via connecting highways. The MD 170 and MD 162 sections of Airport Loop are part of the National Highway System.

== Route description ==
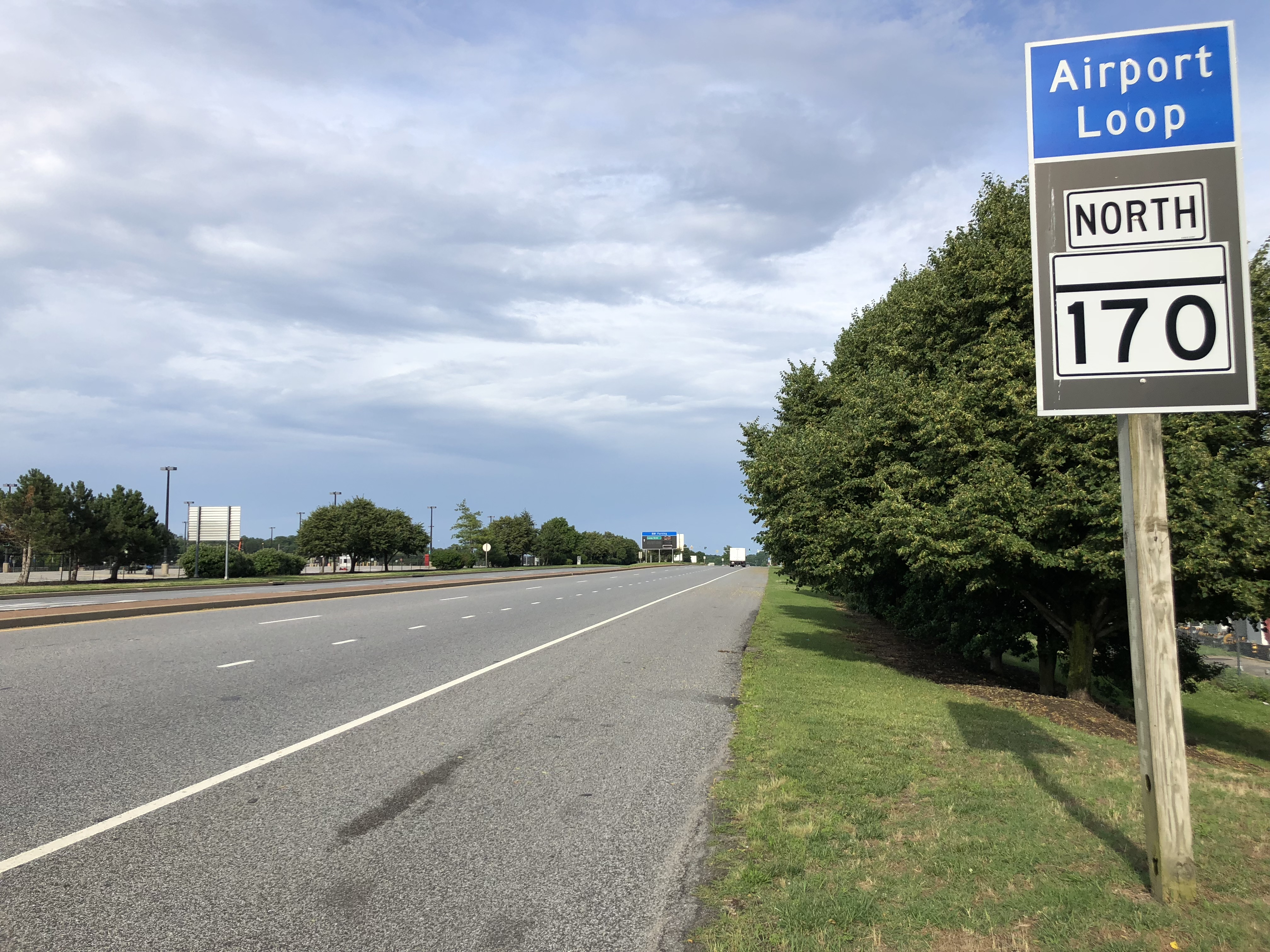
MD 170 northbound along the Airport Loop in Linthicum

Airport Loop begins at I-195/MD 995A (Metropolitan Boulevard) signed as part of MD 170 (Aviation Boulevard). Airport Loop meets the Interstate highway at a partial cloverleaf interchange at the northwest corner of the loop. I-195 heads south to the airport terminal and north toward MD 295 (Baltimore–Washington Parkway) and I-95, which connect BWI Airport with Baltimore and Washington. Airport Loop passes under the BWI Trail and heads east as a four-lane divided highway. At the next intersection, the loop meets Elm Road, which heads south toward the airport terminal and hourly, daily, and express parking lots, and north toward Elkridge Landing Road, which passes through the BWI Hotel District and leads to off-site parking. Immediately east of the intersection, Airport Loop crosses at-grade MTA Maryland's Baltimore Light RailLink. The loop passes to the south of the BWI Business District station, whose kiss-and-ride and park-and-ride facilities can be accessed via Elkridge Landing Road at the next intersection. The air cargo facility is also accessed from that intersection. Airport Loop continues east, paralleling the light rail until the first route change occurs where MD 170 leaves the loop to the north as Camp Meade Road toward I-695 and the loop continues east as MD 162 (Aviation Boulevard).

Airport Loop passes the entrance to both long-term parking lots before intersecting Andover Road, which is unsigned MD 762 and connects with MD 170 in Linthicum. At this point, the loop turns south and is flanked by residential subdivisions to the east and the BWI Trail on the west. The next intersection features Ferndale Road heading east and the entrance to BWI Airport's general aviation facility. Airport Loop passes the offices of the Maryland Aviation Administration before reaching Cromwell Drive, which serves an industrial park and leads to ramps to and from southbound I-97. Airport Loop continues south to an intersection with MD 176 (Dorsey Road) and Stewart Avenue. MD 176 east leads to an interchange with access to northbound I-97. Airport Loop turns west onto westbound MD 176.

Airport Loop heads west as a four-lane divided highway that reduces to a four-lane undivided highway with intermittent center turn lane as the highway passes the aircraft observation park, where the BWI Trail again parallels the loop. The loop passes the overflow parking facility on the north as it passes an industrial park on the south before reaching MD 652 (Old Telegraph Road). A long ramp for northbound MD 170, designated MD 170A, exits westbound MD 176 before MD 176 intersects MD 170, which heads south as Telegraph Road toward an interchange with MD 100 and north as Aviation Boulevard. Airport Loop turns north onto MD 170.

Airport Loop heads north as a four-lane undivided highway paralleled by the BWI Trail on the east and the Amtrak's Northeast Corridor to the west through the trees. The loop intersects Stoney Run Road, which provides access to multiple rental car facilities and a business park. Stoney Run Road heads east then loops around to cross over Airport Loop; this is where the BWI Trail switches to the west side of the highway. At the intersection with Amtrak Way, which is unsigned MD 995 and leads to the BWI Rail Station serving Amtrak and MARC's Penn Line, the BWI Trail splits to the north to follow Amtrak Way as Airport Loop curves to the northeast. Airport Loop completes its circuit of BWI Airport at the interchange with I-195.

== Junction list ==
Airport Loop runs clockwise around BWI Airport. For purposes of this list, mile 0 is located at the I-195 interchange. The entire route is in Anne Arundel County.

Location	mi	km	Destinations	Notes
Linthicum	0.00	0.00	I-195 west (Metropolitan Boulevard/MD 995A south) to MD 295 / I-95 – Baltimore, Washington, Terminal	I-195 exit 1; partial cloverleaf interchange between MD 170 and I-195/MD 995A; MD 995A is unsigned
Linthicum	0.41	0.66	Elm Road south/To Elkridge Landing Road west	Hotel District to west; Airport Hotel, Hourly, Daily, and Express Parking, Terminal to east
Linthicum	0.69	1.11	Elkridge Landing Road west/Air Cargo Drive south	North Cargo to south; Light Rail, Hotel District, Off-site Parking to north
Linthicum	1.16	1.87	MD 170 north (Camp Meade Road) to I-695 – Linthicum	MD 170 leaves Airport Loop; northern terminus of MD 162
Linthicum	1.32	2.12	Long Term Parking	Long Term A to north; Long Term B to south
Linthicum	1.64	2.64	MD 762 north (Andover Road) to MD 170 north – Linthicum	MD 762 is unsigned
Ferndale	1.89	3.04	Ferndale Road east/General Aviation	General Aviation to the west
Ferndale	3.15	5.07	Cromwell Park Drive east to I-97 south – Annapolis, Bay Bridge	Cromwell Park Drive is unsigned MD 162A
Ferndale	3.47	5.58	MD 176 east (Dorsey Road) to I-97 / Stewart Avenue south – Glen Burnie, Baltimore, Annapolis	Southern terminus of MD 162; MD 176 joins Airport Loop; ramp from MD 176 west to MD 170 north is unsigned MD 170A
Hanover	4.77	7.68	Overflow Parking	
Hanover	5.49	8.84	MD 652 south (Old Telegraph Road)	Old alignment of MD 170
Hanover	6.13	9.87	MD 176 west (Dorsey Road) / MD 170 south (Telegraph Road) to MD 100 – Hanover, Odenton	MD 176 leaves Airport Loop; MD 170 joins Airport Loop
Hanover	7.41	11.93	Stoney Run Road – BWI Car Rental Facility	Intersection; Stoney Run Road crosses over Airport Loop
Hanover	8.00	12.87	MD 995 north (Amtrak Way) – BWI Rail Station	MD 995 is unsigned
Hanover	8.44	13.58	I-195 (Metropolitan Boulevard) to MD 295 / I-95 – Baltimore, Washington, Terminal	I-195 exit 1; partial cloverleaf interchange between MD 170 and I-195
1.000 mi = 1.609 km; 1.000 km = 0.621 mi: Route transition

== BWI Trail ==
BWI Trail
- Length: 13.3 mi (21.4 km)
- Location: Glen Burnie, MD; Hanover, MD; Linthicum, MD
- Established: 1994-1999
- Trailheads: Linthicum (Maple Road); Glen Burnie (Stewart Avenue); Hanover (Stoney Run Road); BWI Rail Station (Corporate Center Drive)
- Use: Walking, jogging, biking
- Difficulty: Easy, level, ADA accessible
- Season: Year-round
- Months: Year-round
- Sights: BWI Airport; BWI Business District Station; BWI Rail Station; Dixon Observation Area; National Electronics Museum; Sawmill Creek Park
- Surface: Asphalt

The non-motorized companion to the Airport Loop is the BWI Trail, a 13.3-mile (21.4 km) hiking and bicycling trail that completely encircles BWI Airport. Also constructed by MDSHA and designed for area commuters, the first 4.4-mile (7.1 km) section of the trail opened in July 1994 and the main loop was eventually completed in 1999. Described as a "linear park" circling BWI airport, the trail is believed to be the only one of its type in the entire United States. The BWI Trail connects directly to the Baltimore and Annapolis Trail via the John Overstreet Connector; through this spur, the trail continues the mileage of the Baltimore and Annapolis Trail, increasing counterclockwise around the loop. A trailhead is located at the Thomas A. Dixon, Jr. Aircraft Observation Area, located at the south side of the Airport Loop east of WB&A Road. The trail itself is mostly flat, although the northern segment of the loop has several grades over 6%. The BWI Trail is a part of the East Coast Greenway.

The trail has multiple spurs, all marked as part of the "BWI Trail", aside from the main circle which generally follows the Airport Loop. Beginning from the Dixon Observation Area and going counterclockwise:

- The John Overstreet Connector is the link between the BWI Trail and the Baltimore and Annapolis Trail. It intersects the BWI Trail loop at the intersection of Stewart Avenue and Newport Road, at the BWI Trail's closest approach to I-97. The trail spur follows the street for a short distance across I-97, then turns northeast on its own alignment, passing through Sawmill Creek Park before it connects seamlessly to the northern terminus of the B–A Trail. The John Overstreet Connector is the aforementioned direct extension of the B&A Trail's mileage.
- One begins from the BWI Trail loop at South Hammonds Ferry Road and goes northward, paralleling Hammonds Ferry Road and then the Baltimore Light Rail's right-of-way shortly after for a short distance. It then passes by Linthicum Station, currently ending at Maple Road. This spur is planned to extend further north alongside the Baltimore Light Rail; a $300,000 grant for design of this extension as far north as the Nursery Road Light Rail station was approved in 2012.
- Just beyond Hammonds Ferry, a third spur runs along Andover Road after the BWI Trail mainline turns south to circumnavigate the airport. It runs westward alongside Andover Park, stopping at Main Avenue.
- A fourth spur branches from the main loop east of the bridge over I-195, bound for the airport terminal. It passes over the Airport Loop on another bridge and runs along the inbound side of Terminal Road, ending at the entrance to the BWI Express Parking Lot.
- At Amtrak Way, another spur branches from the Trail and heads north along with the road to access BWI Rail Station. A trail continues beyond here, across the Northeast Corridor, on an elevated boardwalk over Stony Run to access Corporate Center Drive.
