= Maryland Route 176 =

State highway in Maryland, U.S., known as Dorsey Rd

Maryland Route 176
- Dorsey Road
- Maryland Route 176 highlighted in red

Route information
- Maintained by MDSHA
- Length: 5.68 mi (9.14 km)
- Existed: 1929–present

Major junctions
- West end: End of state maintenance in Hanover
- MD 713 in Hanover; MD 170 at Harmans; MD 162 near Ferndale; I-97 near Glen Burnie
- East end: MD 648 in Glen Burnie

Location
- Country: United States
- State: Maryland
- Counties: Anne Arundel, Howard

Highway system
- Maryland highway system; Interstate; US; State; Scenic Byways
← MD 175	→ MD 177

Maryland Route 176 (MD 176) is a state highway in the U.S. state of Maryland. Known as Dorsey Road, the highway runs 5.68 miles (9.14 km) from the end of state maintenance in Hanover east to MD 648 in Glen Burnie. MD 176 is a mostly four-lane highway that parallels MD 100 and forms the southern portion of the Airport Loop, a circumferential highway around Baltimore/Washington International Thurgood Marshall Airport (BWI Airport) that connects the airport with various airport-related services. The highway serves as the main connection between the Airport Loop and Interstate 97 (I-97).

MD 176 was constructed in the late 1920s between Glen Burnie and Dorsey at the Anne Arundel–Howard county line. The state highway was extended west to U.S. Route 1 (US 1) near Elkridge in the late 1930s concurrent with the construction of railroad grade separations at Dorsey and Harmans. MD 176 was widened over much of its length in the late 1940s and in Anne Arundel County in the 1970s and 1980s. MD 100 became the primary highway connecting Elkridge and Glen Burnie in the mid-1990s; MD 176 was subsequently truncated at Hanover. The portion of MD 176 west of MD 295 became an eastern extension of MD 103.

== Route description ==
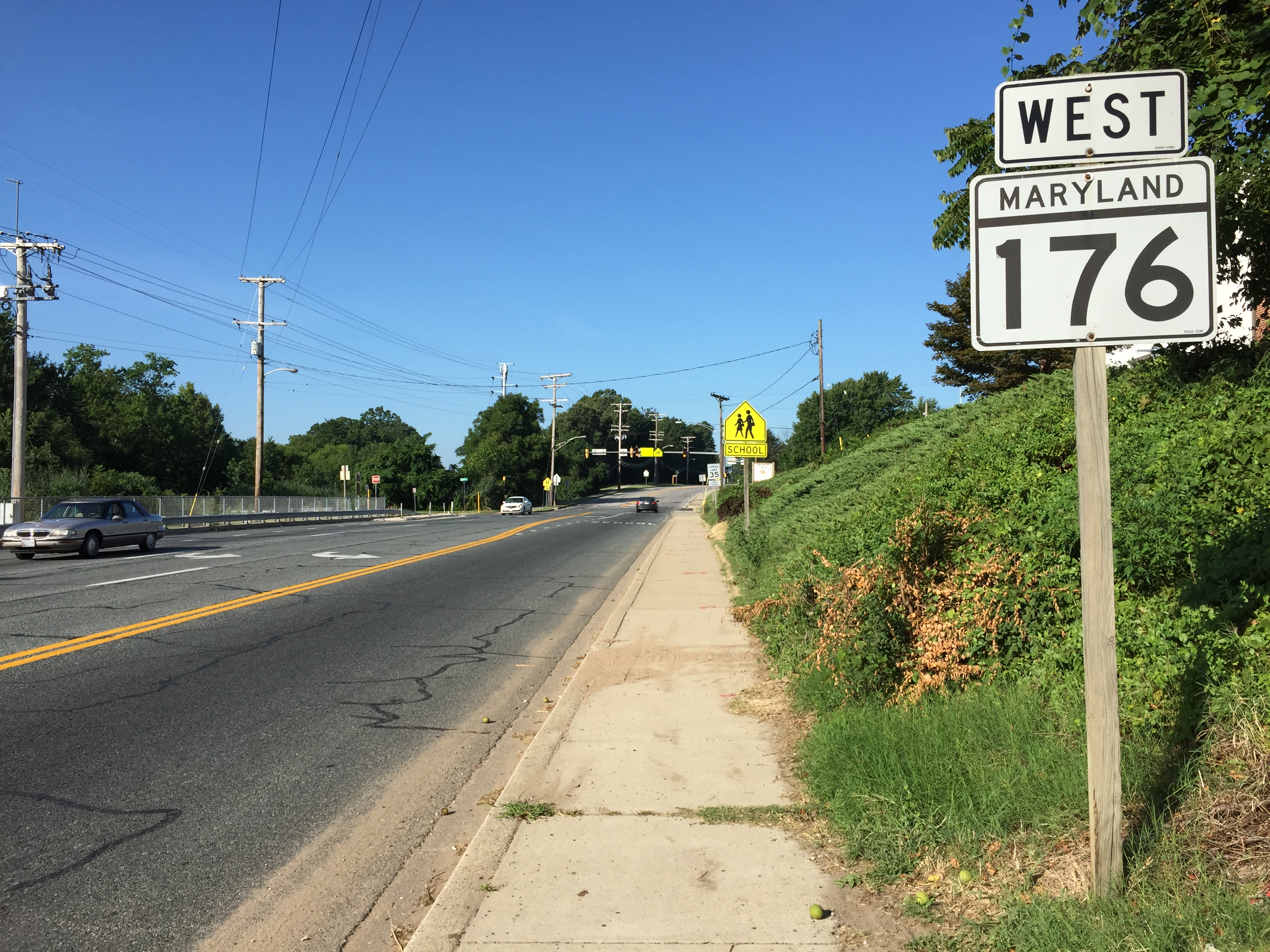
View west from the east end of MD 176 at MD 648 in Glen Burnie

MD 176 begins at the west end of state maintenance adjacent to the cloverleaf interchange between MD 100 (Paul T. Pitcher Memorial Highway) with MD 295 (Baltimore–Washington Parkway) in Hanover. Dorsey Road continues north as a county highway through an industrial park. MD 176 heads east as a two-lane undivided road that crosses Piney Run. The highway meets the northern edge of MD 713 (Arundel Mills Boulevard) just north of the highway's interchange with MD 100 northeast of the Arundel Mills shopping mall. MD 176 continues east as a four-lane undivided highway between a residential area to the south and industrial parks to the north. The highway parallels its old alignment, part of which is MD 645, through the hamlet of Harmans. There, the highway crosses over Stoney Run and Amtrak's Northeast Corridor railroad line, which also carries MARC's Penn Line. Just east of the railroad crossing, MD 176 intersects MD 170, which heads south as Telegraph Road and north as Aviation Boulevard.

MD 176 continues east along the southern portion of the Airport Loop surrounding BWI Airport on the northern edge of Severn. The highway passes between the airport property to the north and a residential area on the south. MD 176 intersects MD 652 (Old Telegraph Road) and WB&A Road and passes the Thomas A. Dixon Aircraft Observation Area. The route becomes a divided highway and reaches the eastern end of its portion of Airport Loop at its junction with MD 162 (Aviation Boulevard) at the southern edge of Ferndale. East of MD 162, MD 176 has an incomplete partial cloverleaf interchange with I-97. The missing movement, from southbound I-97 to MD 176, is handled via MD 162. The state highway becomes undivided just before reaching its eastern terminus at MD 648 (Baltimore–Annapolis Boulevard) in Glen Burnie. This intersection is adjacent to one of two southern ends of MTA Maryland's Baltimore Light RailLink; the terminal station, Glen Burnie station, is accessed via MD 648. The junction is also next to the northern end of the Baltimore & Annapolis Trail. The eastern leg of the intersection is 8th Avenue N.W.

MD 176 is a part of the National Highway System as an intermodal connector between MD 162 and I-97.

== History ==
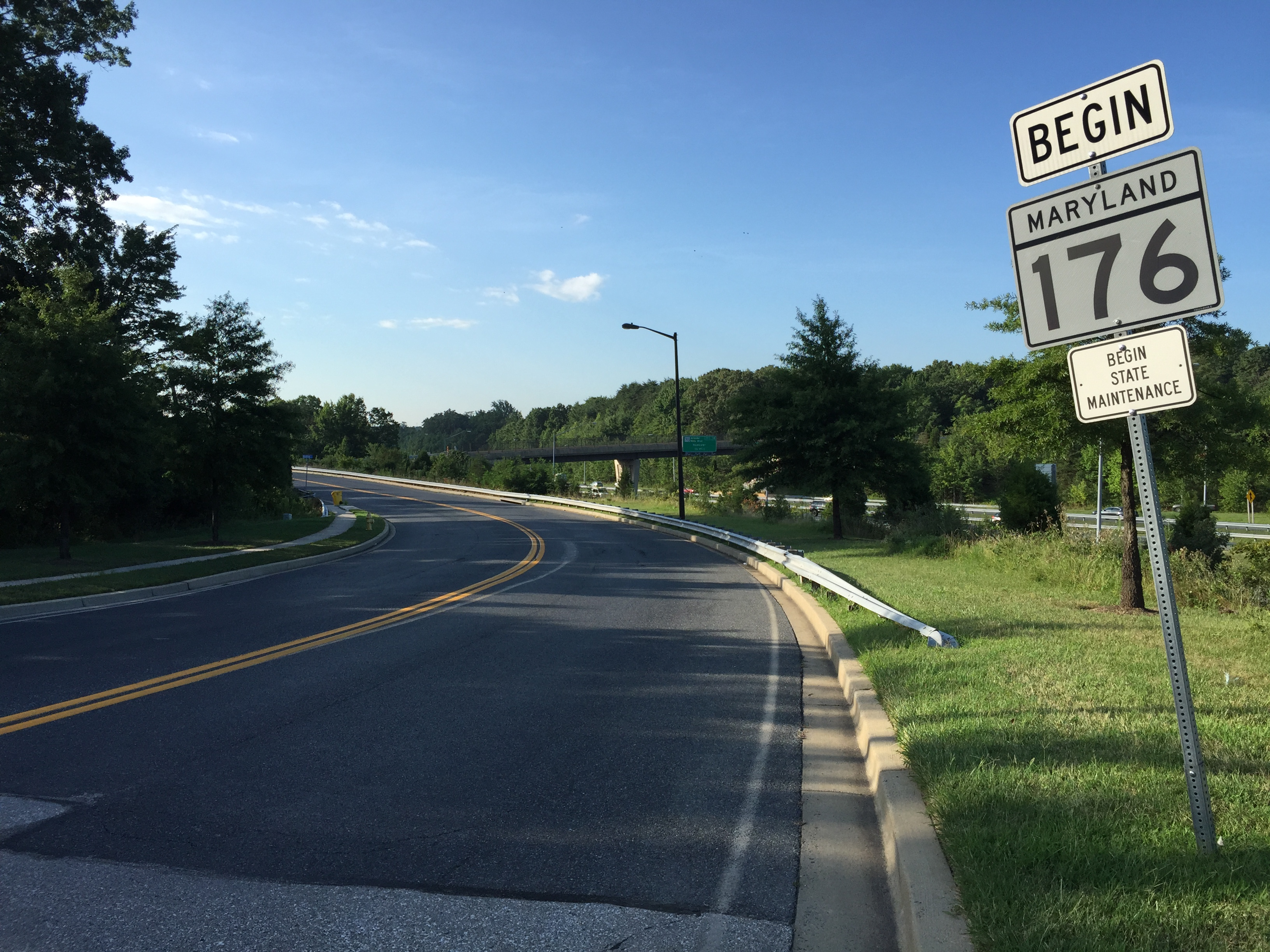
Beginning of eastbound MD 176 in Hanover

MD 176 was constructed as a concrete road from MD 3 (later US 301 and now MD 648) in Glen Burnie west to the Baltimore and Ohio Railroad crossing at Dorsey at the Anne Arundel–Howard county line in 1929. The connection between the railroad crossing and US 1—the highway intersected US 1 just south of the modern US 1–MD 100 interchange—remained a county highway until 1936. Work on MD 176's grade separations of the Baltimore and Ohio Railroad and Pennsylvania Railroad at Dorsey and Harmans, respectively, were underway by 1936. MD 176's overpass of the Pennsylvania Railroad was finished in 1936 and its underpass of the Baltimore and Ohio Railroad was complete by 1938. The old alignment of MD 176 at Harmans became MD 645. MD 176 has also had two other railroad crossings. The highway crossed over the Washington, Baltimore and Annapolis Electric Railway on a "weak and narrow wooden bridge" until 1944, when the bridge over the abandoned railroad was removed and the railroad embankment was filled. By 1951, MD 176 had an underpass of the Baltimore and Annapolis Railroad immediately to the west of US 301 that has since been removed.

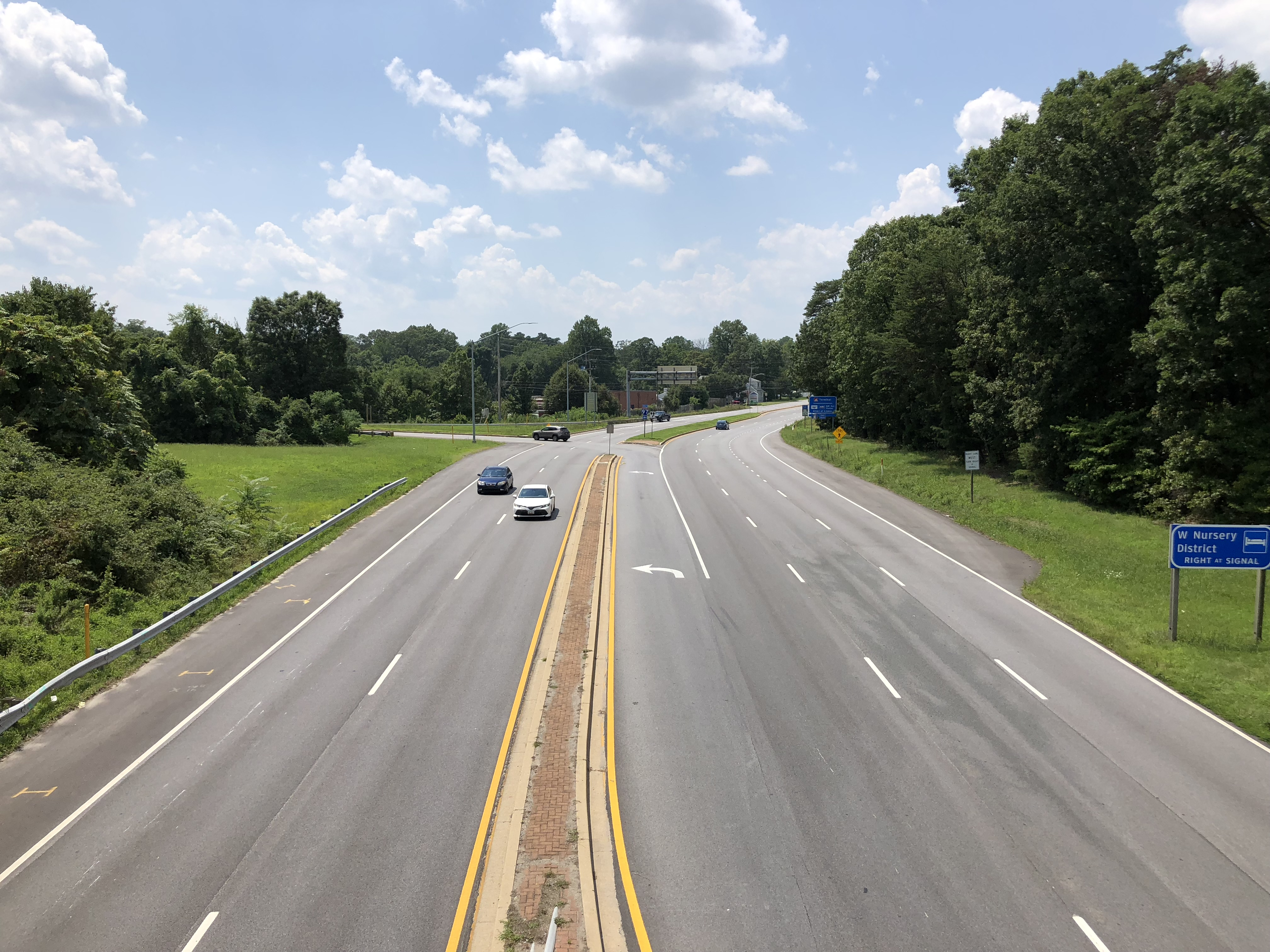
MD 176 westbound viewed from I-97 in Ferndale

MD 176 was widened and resurfaced over its whole length between 1947 and 1950. The highway was expanded to a width of 22 feet (6.7 m) from Dorsey to Harmans and to 24 feet (7.3 m) from Harmans to Glen Burnie. The MD 295–MD 176 interchange was built as a diamond interchange between 1950 and 1953; a loop ramp from eastbound MD 176 to northbound MD 295 was added in 1956. The highway's interchange with the Glen Burnie Bypass, which started as US 301, became MD 3, and is now I-97, was constructed as a diamond interchange between 1954 and 1956. MD 176 was expanded to a divided highway on either side of its interchange with MD 3 (now I-97) by 1978. The remainder of MD 176 from the west end of the divided highway to just east of MD 295 was expanded to four lanes in the late 1980s, with the bridge of Piney Run between MD 295 and MD 713 rebuilt in 1987 and the railroad overpass at Harmans rebuilt in 1989.

MD 176 was superseded by MD 100 in the early to mid-1990s. MD 176 was expanded to a divided highway on either side of its interchange with MD 295, which was rebuilt as a cloverleaf interchange, in 1992 and 1993. By the latter year, MD 100 was under construction from US 1 to I-97. MD 100 was completed in 1995; the freeway took over as the east–west highway through the MD 295 interchange. MD 176 was temporarily assigned to Wright Road, Race Road, and Faulkner Road to connect the portions of the highway on either side of the interchange. Also in 1995, the highway was relocated to the current double-curve roadway to the US 1–MD 103 intersection. MD 103 was extended over that relocation east to its present eastern terminus and MD 176 was truncated at its present western terminus by 1997. The portion of this detour on Wright Road over MD 295 was retained in the state system and designated MD 176B. The highway's interchange with I-97 was reconstructed to its present form by 1999.

== Junction list ==
The entire route is in Anne Arundel County.

Location	mi	km	Destinations	Notes
Hanover	0.00	0.00	Dorsey Road north	Western terminus; end of state maintenance
Hanover	0.86	1.38	MD 713 south (Arundel Mills Boulevard) to MD 100 / MD 103 / New Ridge Road north – Fort Meade, Arundel Mills	Northern terminus of MD 713
Harmans	2.07	3.33	MD 170 (Telegraph Road/Aviation Boulevard) – Odenton, BWI Airport	MD 176 joins Airport Loop
Severn	2.71	4.36	MD 652 south (Old Telegraph Road)	Northern terminus of MD 652
Ferndale	4.73	7.61	MD 162 north (Aviation Boulevard) – BWI Airport	Southern terminus of MD 162; MD 176 leaves Airport Loop
Glen Burnie	4.99	8.03	I-97 – Baltimore, Bay Bridge, Annapolis	I-97 Exit 15; access from southbound I-97 to MD 176 is via MD 162
Glen Burnie	5.68	9.14	MD 648 (Baltimore–Annapolis Boulevard) / 8th Avenue N.W. – Ferndale	Eastern terminus
1.000 mi = 1.609 km; 1.000 km = 0.621 mi

== Auxiliary routes ==
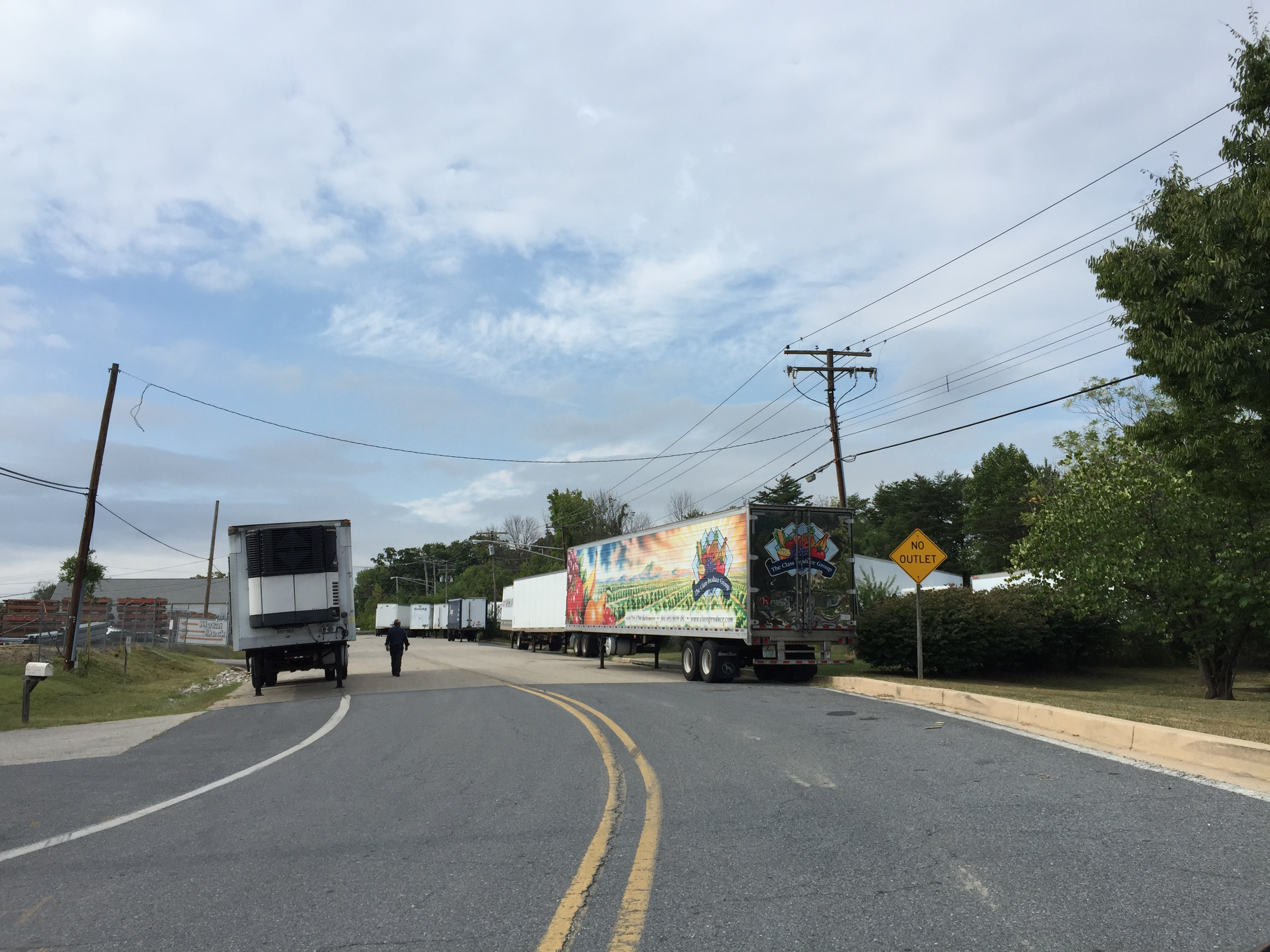
MD 176C, which is a former alignment of MD 176 near Dorsey

- MD 176B is the designation for the 0.23-mile (0.37 km) section of Wright Road from Race Road east to a right-angle turn north; this segment includes the highway's bridge over MD 295. This section of highway was part of MD 176's detour along Wright Road, Race Road, and Faulkner Road when MD 100 assumed MD 176's interchange with MD 295 around 1995. All but what is now MD 176B and the bridge over MD 100, which became MD 100N, were transferred back to county maintenance by 1997.
- MD 176C is the designation for Binder Lane, a 0.15-mile (0.24 km) section of the old alignment of MD 176 from MD 103 northwest to a dead end adjacent to US 1's interchange with MD 100 west of Dorsey in Howard County. MD 176C was assigned by 1999 after MD 176 (now MD 103) was relocated to the double-curve section east of US 1 in 1995.
