= Maryland Route 175 =

State highway in Howard and Anne Arundel Counties, Maryland, U.S.

Maryland Route 175
- Maryland Route 175 highlighted in red

Route information
- Maintained by MDSHA
- Length: 17.01 mi (27.37 km)
- Existed: 1927–present

Major junctions
- West end: Little Patuxent Parkway in Columbia
- US 29 in Columbia; MD 108 in Columbia; I-95 near Columbia; US 1 near Jessup; MD 295 in Jessup; MD 713 near Fort Meade; MD 32 near Odenton; MD 170 in Odenton
- East end: MD 3 in Millersville

Location
- Country: United States
- State: Maryland
- Counties: Howard, Anne Arundel

Highway system
- Maryland highway system; Interstate; US; State; Scenic Byways
← MD 174	→ MD 176

Maryland Route 175 is a state highway in the U.S. state of Maryland. The highway runs 17.01 miles (27.37 km) from Little Patuxent Parkway in Columbia east to MD 3 in Millersville. MD 175 is a major highway through the large unincorporated community of Columbia; the highway connects U.S. Route 29 (US 29) next to Columbia Town Center with Interstate 95 (I-95) and an industrial area on the eastern side of Howard County. MD 175 also connects Fort Meade with Jessup and Odenton in western Anne Arundel County, where it links MD 295 and MD 32 with the eastern part of the U.S. Army base.

MD 175 was constructed from Ellicott City to Millersville in the late 1920s and early 1930s as part of three routes: MD 531 from MD 103 near Ellicott City to US 1 near Jessup, MD 175 from there to Fort Meade and north to Hanover, and MD 180 from Odenton to Millersville. The highway did not originally extend through Fort Meade; MD 175 was constructed through the military installation in the early 1940s as part of major upgrades to the highway from Jessup to Odenton due to its strategic importance. By 1946, MD 175 extended from Ellicott City to Millersville. The highway was widened from Odenton to Millersville in the late 1940s and from Ellicott City to Odenton in the mid-1950s. MD 175 was relocated at I-95 around 1970 and as a major highway through the newly constructed community of Columbia in the mid-1970s. The old portion of the highway from Ellicott City to the new highway became MD 108 and MD 104. There are plans to expand MD 175 to a multi-lane divided highway through Fort Meade due to increased activity at the Army post.

== Route description ==
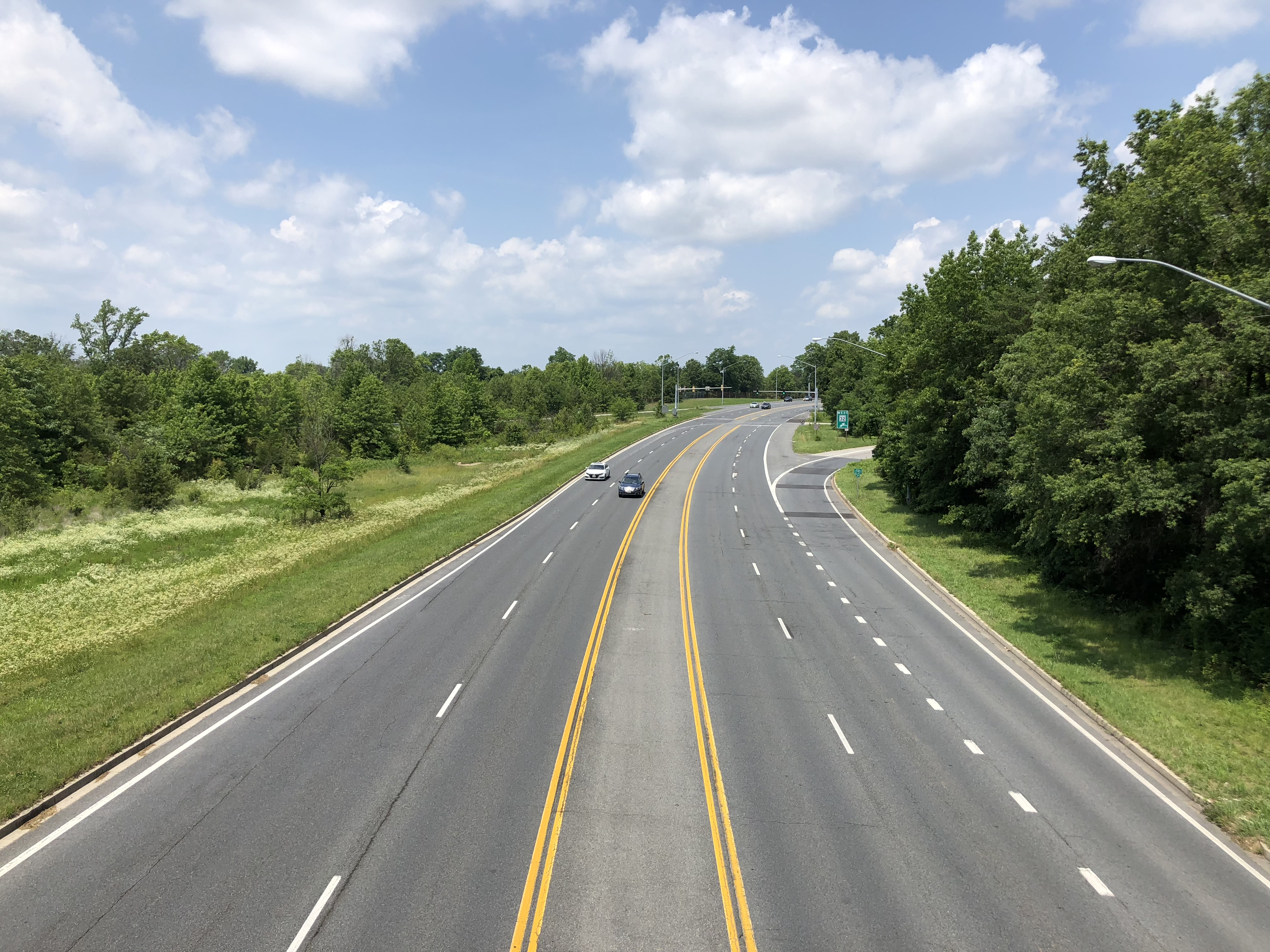
View west along MD 175 from MD 32 near Fort Meade

MD 175 begins just west of its bridges over the Little Patuxent River. The highway continues southwest as Little Patuxent Parkway, the county-maintained six-lane divided highway that forms the main street of Columbia Town Center. MD 175 heads east as Rouse Parkway, a four-lane divided limited-access highway; the highway was renamed from Little Patuxent Parkway to honor Columbia founder James Rouse and his wife Patty in 2006. The highway immediately has a cloverleaf interchange with US 29 (Columbia Pike). MD 175 heads southeast through intersections with Thunder Hill Road, Oakland Mills Road, Tamar Drive, and Dobbin Road as it passes between the Columbia villages of Oakland Mills to the southwest and Long Reach to the northeast. The state highway expands to six lanes at Dobbin Road and has a partial cloverleaf interchange with Snowden River Parkway that provides access to a park and ride lot serving MTA Maryland commuter buses and a trumpet interchange with Columbia Gateway Drive. Access from eastbound MD 175 to Columbia Gateway Drive requires using the Snowden River Parkway interchange. MD 175 widens to eight lanes at Columbia Gateway Drive, a width the highway carries through its intersection with the eastern end of MD 108 (Waterloo Road) to the highway's partial cloverleaf interchange with I-95. The highway's name changes from Rouse Parkway to Waterloo Road at the MD 108 junction. MD 175 has six lanes from I-95 to east of its junction with US 1 (Washington Boulevard), which was the site of a tavern called Waterloo and before that Spurrier's Tavern.

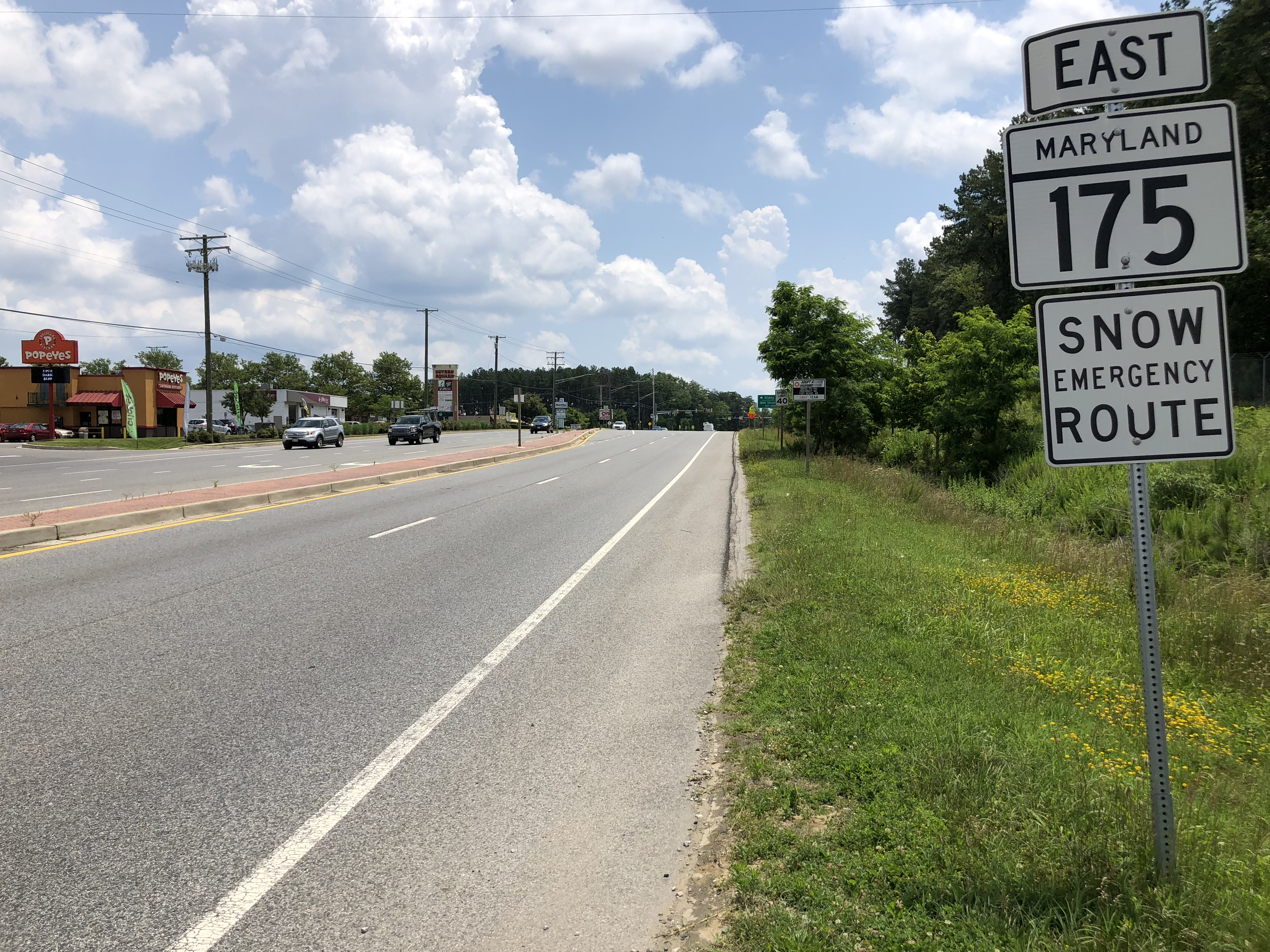
View east along MD 175 at MD 713 near Fort Meade

MD 175 narrows to a two-lane undivided road as it passes between the Maryland Wholesale Produce Distribution Center to the southwest and the Patuxent Institution on the northeast and enters Jessup. East of Dorsey Run Road, which leads to the Jessup Auto Distribution Center, the state highway crosses over CSX's Capital Subdivision railroad line and enters Anne Arundel County, where the highway's name changes to Jessup Road. East of the tracks, MD 175 meets the eastern end of unsigned MD 723 (Old Jessup Road), which accesses the Jessup station on MARC's Camden Line, which uses the Capital Subdivision tracks. The highway continues east past the former Maryland House of Correction and has a cloverleaf interchange with MD 295 (Baltimore–Washington Parkway), where the highway's name becomes Annapolis Road. MD 175 temporarily expands to four lanes at its intersection with MD 713, which heads south as Rockenbach Road into Fort Meade and north as Ridge Road toward Hanover. The highway passes through the eastern part of Fort Meade and expands to a four-lane road with a center left-turn lane at Reece Road, which becomes MD 174 on the eastern boundary of the military installation.

At the southeastern corner of the fort, MD 175 has a partial cloverleaf interchange with MD 32 (Patuxent Freeway) and enters Odenton. The highway crosses over Amtrak's Northeast Corridor railroad line and meets the southern end of MD 170 (Telegraph Road); the south leg of the intersection, Piney Orchard Parkway, leads to the Odenton station on MARC's Penn Line, which uses the Amtrak tracks. MD 175 continues as a four-lane undivided highway to a five-legged roundabout at the eastern end of Odenton where the highway meets Odenton Road, Higgins Drive, and Sappington Station Road, which is unsigned MD 32AA. The highway continues as a two-lane undivided road to the northeast of Arundel High School and through the village of Gambrills before reaching its eastern terminus at MD 3 (Robert Crain Highway) west of Millersville. MD 175 has separate intersections with southbound and northbound MD 3; Millersville Road continues east from the northbound intersection through the eponymous village and past the historic Childs Residence.

MD 175 is a part of the National Highway System as an intermodal freight transport connector from I-95 to Dorsey Run Road in Jessup and as a principal arterial from US 29 to I-95 through Columbia.

== History ==
Maryland Route 180
- Location: Odenton–Millersville
- Existed: 1930–c. 1946

The first section of MD 175 was constructed between 1924 and 1926 as a macadam road from US 1 southeast to the entrance of the Maryland House of Correction east of the Baltimore and Ohio Railroad (now CSX) in Jessup. MD 175 was extended as a concrete road east to its modern intersection with MD 713, then northeast along what later became MD 713 to MD 176 in Hanover in 1929. The easternmost portion of MD 175, which was originally MD 180, was constructed as a concrete road starting in 1930 from MD 3 to the Pennsylvania Railroad (now Amtrak) in Odenton; the highway was complete west to Gambrills by the end of 1930. The original western part of MD 175, from US 1 in Jessup to MD 103 in Ellicott City, was constructed as MD 531 in 1932. The portion of the highway through Fort Meade was a public highway maintained by Anne Arundel County or the federal government through World War II.

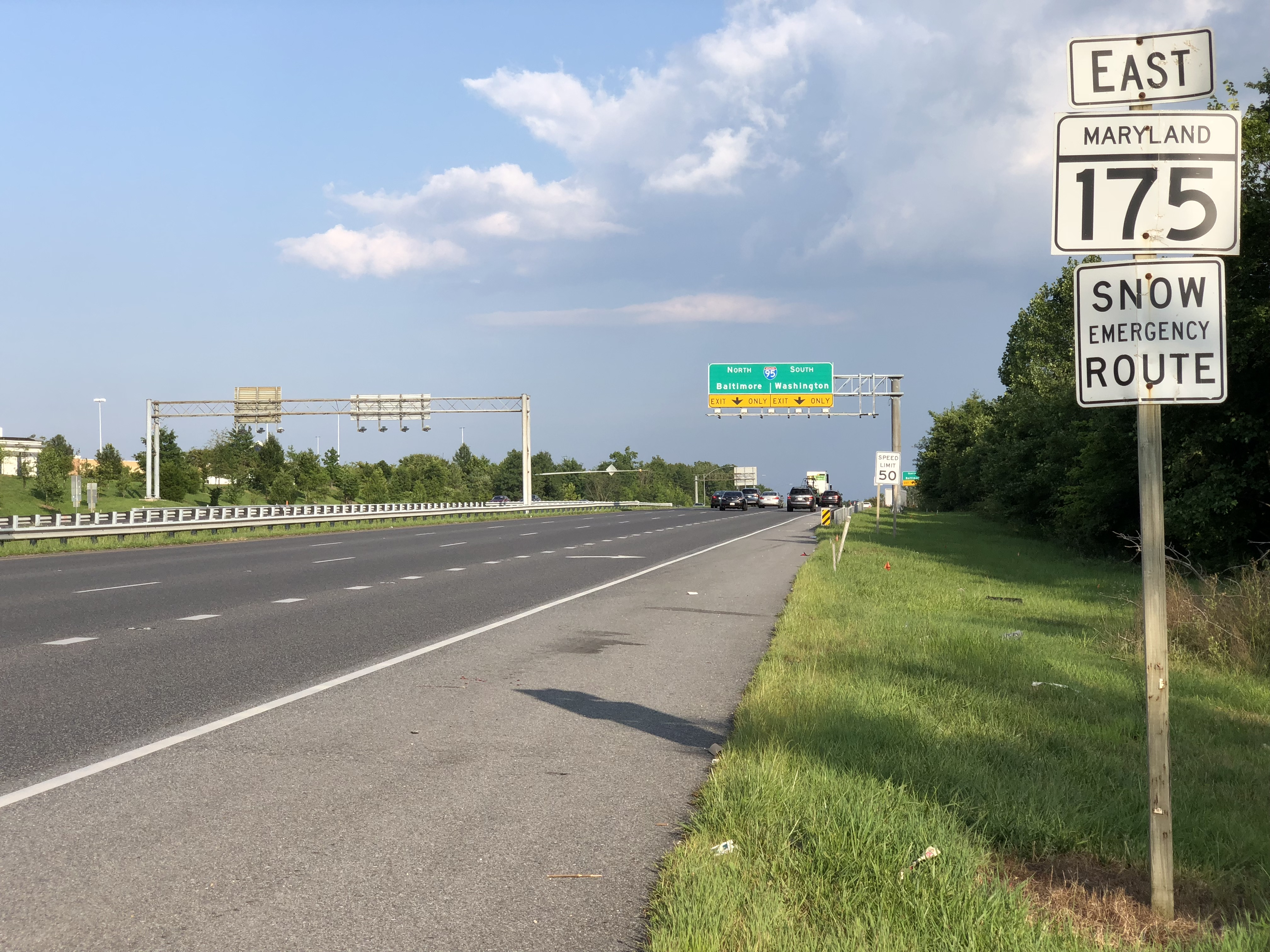
MD 175 eastbound approaching I-95 in Columbia

MD 180's crossing of the Pennsylvania Railroad was constructed in 1938. The highway was relocated through Odenton using the new bridge in 1938 and 1939; the old road became MD 677. MD 175's bridge over the Baltimore and Ohio Railroad in Jessup was completed in 1942. The highway was widened to a 24-foot (7.3 m) wide road with a concrete base and asphalt surface from Jessup to the MD 713 intersection in 1942. MD 175 was also extended as a 24-foot (7.3 m) road through Fort Meade from MD 713 to west of Odenton between 1942 and 1944. By 1946, MD 175 had been extended east over MD 180 to Millersville and west over MD 531 to Ellicott City; the portion of MD 175 from Fort Meade to MD 176 became MD 713. MD 175 was widened from 16 to 22 feet (4.9 to 6.7 m) from Odenton to Millersville starting in 1948. The highway was widened and resurfaced from Odenton to the newly constructed Baltimore–Washington Expressway interchange in 1954. MD 175 was also widened with curve amelioration from US 1 to MD 103 between 1954 and 1956.

MD 175's first divided highway section was created when the highway was relocated from US 1 to just south of the modern MD 108 intersection in conjunction with the construction of the I-95 interchange in 1969 and 1970. The state highway's interchange with US 29 in Columbia was built in several stages. The westbound and eastbound bridges across the Little Patuxent River were built in 1970 and 1974, respectively. The first parts of the interchange to open were the ramps between county-maintained Little Patuxent Parkway and southbound US 29. MD 175's bridges over US 29 were built in 1974. The interchange fully opened when the new Little Patuxent Parkway was completed from the existing highway at the present MD 108 interchange west to US 29 in 1977. The portion of MD 175 north of the new highway was replaced by an eastward extension of MD 108 and MD 104. The highway's trumpet interchange with Dobbin Road opened with Little Patuxent Parkway. MD 175 was two lanes from US 29 to Dobbin Road until the road was expanded to a divided highway in 1987. The highway's interchange with Snowden River Parkway was constructed in 2001. MD 175's roundabout in Odenton was installed in 2004.

The Maryland State Highway Administration plans to upgrade MD 175 from MD 295 in Jessup east to MD 170 in Odenton in response to the greatly increased traffic destined for Fort Meade due to the Base Realignment and Closure process. The state plans to expand MD 175 to a six-lane divided highway along the 5.2-mile (8.4 km) stretch, construct intersection improvements at MD 713, Reece Road, Mapes Road, and Charter Oaks Boulevard, and reconstruct the MD 295 interchange. One of the first projects to begin construction is improvements at the MD 713 intersection, which started in 2011 and were expected to be completed in 2013.

== Junction list ==
County	Location	mi	km	Destinations	Notes
Howard	Columbia	0.00	0.00	Little Patuxent Parkway – Columbia Town Center	Western terminus; end of state maintenance
Howard	Columbia	0.32	0.51	US 29 (Columbia Pike) – Baltimore, Washington	US 29 Exit 20
Howard	Columbia	1.40	2.25	Oakland Mills Road – Blandair Park, Oakland Mills	Eastbound exit and entrance
Howard	Columbia	3.54	5.70	Snowden River Parkway / Columbia Gateway Drive – Long Reach, Owen Brown	Partial cloverleaf interchange, frontage road to Columbia Gateway
Howard	Columbia	3.89	6.26	Columbia Gateway Drive – Columbia Gateway Business Park	Trumpet interchange (eastbound only), frontage road westbound
Howard	Columbia	4.48	7.21	MD 108 west (Waterloo Road) – Ellicott City	Eastern terminus of MD 108
Howard	Columbia	5.19	8.35	I-95 – Baltimore, Washington	I-95 Exit 41
Howard	Jessup	5.65	9.09	US 1 (Washington Boulevard) – Laurel, Elkridge	
Anne Arundel	Jessup	8.59	13.82	MD 295 (Baltimore–Washington Parkway) – Baltimore, BWI Airport, Washington	Cloverleaf interchange
Anne Arundel	Fort Meade	7.27	11.70	MD 713 (Ridge Road/Rockenbach Road) – Hanover, Fort Meade	
Anne Arundel	Odenton	12.68	20.41	MD 32 (Patuxent Freeway) – Columbia, Annapolis	MD 32 Exit 6
Anne Arundel	Odenton	13.74	22.11	MD 170 north (Telegraph Road) / Piney Orchard Parkway south – Severn, Piney Orchard	Southern terminus of MD 170
Anne Arundel	Odenton	14.74	23.72	Sappington Station Road north / Odenton Road west / Higgins Drive south	Roundabout; Sappington Station Road is unsigned MD 32AA
Anne Arundel	Millersville	16.88	27.17	MD 3 south (Robert Crain Highway) – Bowie	
Anne Arundel	Millersville	17.01	27.37	MD 3 north (Robert Crain Highway) to I-97 – Baltimore	Eastern terminus
1.000 mi = 1.609 km; 1.000 km = 0.621 mi: Incomplete access

== Auxiliary routes ==
- MD 175AA is the designation for the 0.02-mile (0.032 km) section of Max Blob Park Road from the intersection of MD 175 and Clark Road south to the portion of Max Blob Park Road designated MD 917 just east of the MD 175–MD 295 interchange in Jessup.
- MD 175HC is the designation for the 0.37-mile (0.60 km) eastbound collector/distributor roadway from Snowden River Parkway east to MD 175's bridge over Columbia Gateway Drive, where MD 175HC merges with eastbound MD 175, in Columbia. The highway allows eastbound MD 175 and Snowden River Parkway traffic to access Columbia Gateway Drive. Prior to the completion of the interchange between MD 175 and Snowden River Parkway, MD 175HC began just east of the intersection of the two roads.
