= Maryland Route 170 =

State highway in Anne Arundel County, Maryland, United States

Maryland Route 170
- Maryland Route 170 highlighted in red

Route information
- Maintained by MDSHA
- Length: 12.98 mi (20.89 km)
- Existed: 1927–present

Major junctions
- South end: MD 175 in Odenton
- MD 32 near Odenton; MD 174 in Severn; MD 100 near Severn; MD 176 at Harmans; I-195 near BWI Airport; MD 162 near Linthicum; I-695 near Linthicum; MD 648 in Pumphrey
- North end: MD 2 in Brooklyn Park

Location
- Country: United States
- State: Maryland
- Counties: Anne Arundel

Highway system
- Maryland highway system; Interstate; US; State; Scenic Byways
← MD 169	→ MD 171

Maryland Route 170 (MD 170) is a state highway in the U.S. state of Maryland. The state highway runs 12.98 miles (20.89 km) from MD 175 in Odenton north to MD 2 in Brooklyn Park. MD 170 connects the western Anne Arundel County communities of Odenton and Severn and the North County communities of Linthicum, Pumphrey, and Brooklyn Park with Baltimore/Washington International Thurgood Marshall Airport (BWI Airport). The highway connects BWI Airport with Interstate 695 (I-695) and MD 100 and forms part of the Airport Loop, a circumferential highway that connects the airport and I-195 with many airport-related services.

MD 170 originally served as the main highway between Baltimore and Fort George G. Meade. This highway, which included part of modern MD 174 west of Severn, was mostly constructed shortly after Camp Meade was established during World War I in the late 1910s. The Odenton–Severn portion of MD 170 was originally built as MD 554 in the 1930s, but became part of MD 170 in the mid-1940s. MD 170 went through another round of upgrades in the early 1940s due to its strategic importance during World War II. The highway originally passed through the area now occupied by BWI Airport. MD 170 was relocated north of MD 176 in the late 1940s during the construction of the airport and south of MD 176 in the late 1950s. The highway has been expanded to four lanes around its interchanges with I-195, I-695, MD 32, and MD 100 and along the perimeter of BWI Airport since the 1960s.

== Route description ==
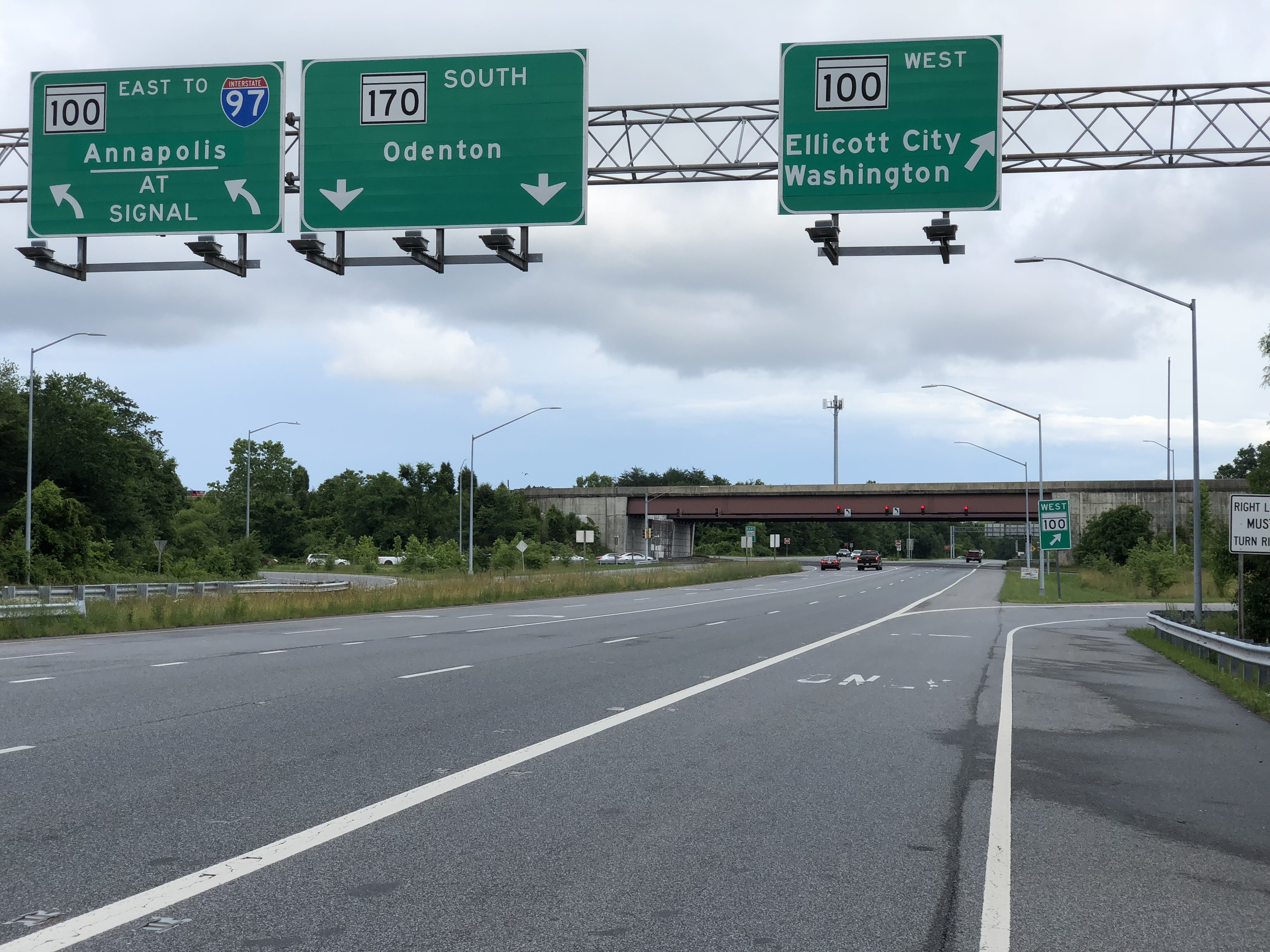
MD 170 southbound at MD 100 in Severn

MD 170 begins at an intersection with MD 175 (Annapolis Road) in Odenton. The highway continues south as county-maintained Piney Orchard Parkway, which leads to the Odenton station on MARC's Penn Line and the Piney Orchard community. MD 170 heads north on Telegraph Road, which begins as a four-lane divided highway but reduces to a two-lane undivided road and passes through an industrial area. The state highway expands to a four-lane divided highway again shortly before its diamond interchange with MD 32 (Patuxent Freeway). MD 170 continues north as a two-lane road with a center left-turn lane that crosses Severn Run. The center turn lane ends as the highway approaches the center of Severn. There, the highway intersects MD 174, which heads west as Reece Road and east as Donaldson Avenue. MD 170 expands to a four-lane divided highway as it approaches its single-point urban interchange with MD 100 (Paul T. Pitcher Memorial Highway). The highway becomes a four-lane undivided road between MD 100 and its intersection with MD 176 (Dorsey Road) at Harmans. The long ramp from westbound MD 176 to northbound MD 100 is unsigned MD 170A.

MD 170 continues north as Aviation Boulevard and joins the Airport Loop. The highway parallels Amtrak's Northeast Corridor railroad line, which carries MARC's Penn Line, and the hiker-biker BWI Trail. MD 170 meets the eastern end of Stoney Run Road, which heads east and immediately loops back west and crosses over the state highway and the railroad on its way to the BWI Car Rental Facility. The highway intersects the southern terminus of unsigned MD 995 (Amtrak Way), which leads to the BWI Rail Station serving Amtrak and MARC trains, as it gradually curves to the east. MD 170 crosses Kitten Branch immediately before its partial cloverleaf interchange with the eastern terminus of I-195 (Metropolitan Boulevard). The highway passes under the BWI Trail and expands to a divided highway before its intersection with Terminal Road and an at-grade intersection with MTA Maryland's Baltimore Light RailLink. Access to the rail line's BWI Business District station is via Elkridge Landing Road at the next intersection. MD 170 leaves the Airport Loop at its intersection with the northern terminus of MD 162 (Aviation Boulevard), where the highway turns north onto Camp Meade Road.

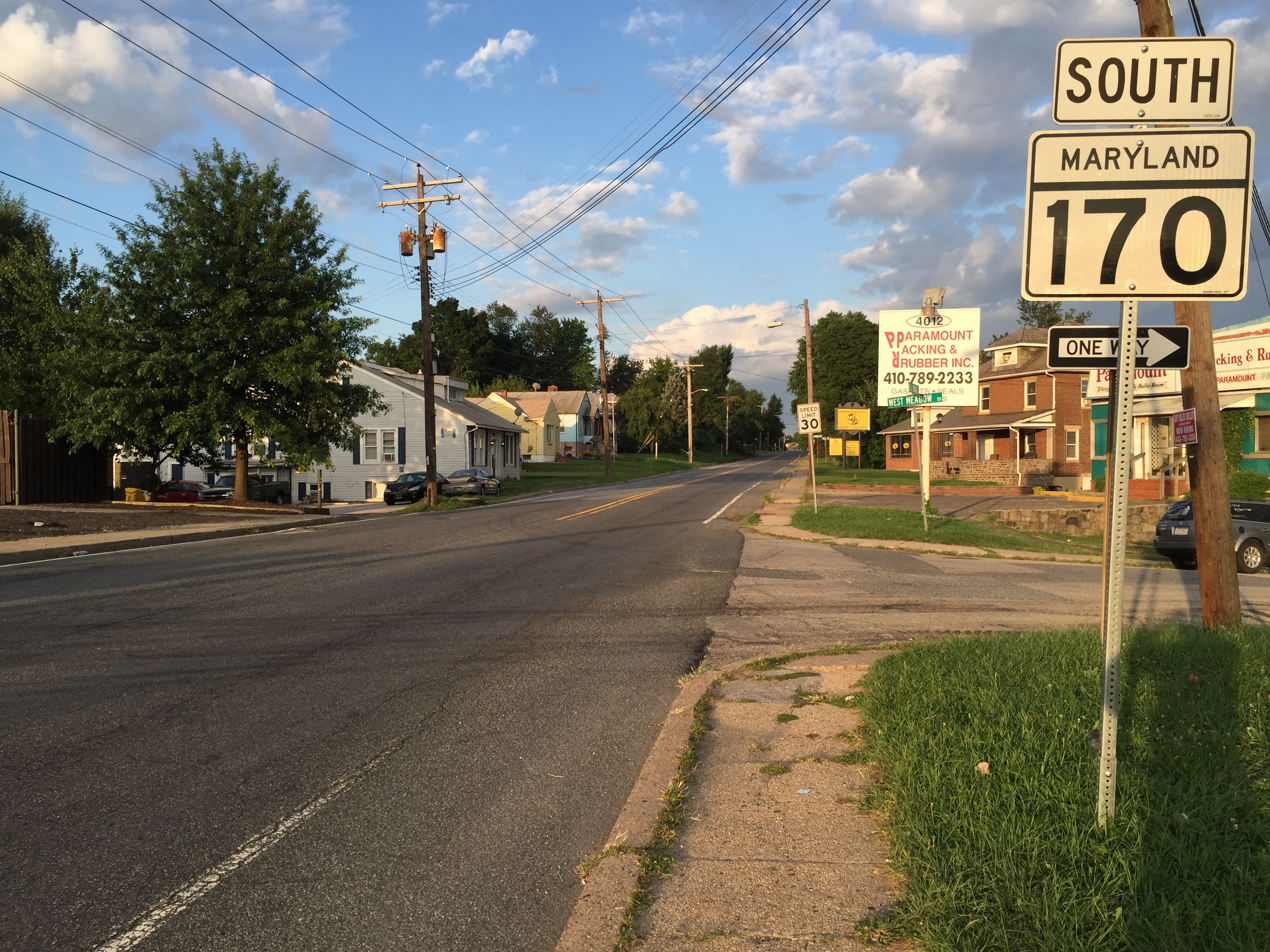
View south from the north end of MD 170 at MD 2 in Brooklyn Park

MD 170 intersects the Baltimore Light RailLink again and begins to parallel it as a two-lane road with a center turn lane. The light rail veers away to the east shortly before the highway's intersection with the northern terminus of MD 762 (Andover Road), where the center turn lane ends. MD 170 enters Linthicum and intersects the light rail line a third time and begins to parallel it again shortly before the Linthicum station in the center of the community. The highway intersects MD 169 (Maple Road) and expands to a four-lane divided highway shortly before its partial cloverleaf interchange with I-695 (Baltimore Beltway). There is no access from MD 170 to eastbound I-695 or from westbound I-695 to MD 170. The highway reduces to a two-lane road again and passes the North Linthicum station just south of MD 648 (Baltimore–Annapolis Boulevard) in the center of Pumphrey. MD 170 continues northeast as Belle Grove Road, which veers away from the light rail line. The highway parallels the Patapsco River and passes under I-895 Spur (Harbor Tunnel Thruway) before entering Brooklyn Park. There, MD 170 reaches its northern terminus at a five-way intersection with MD 2, Jack Street, and Hanover Street at the Baltimore city limits. MD 2 heads south as Governor Ritchie Highway toward Glen Burnie and north into the city as Potee Street.

MD 170 is a part of the National Highway System from its southern terminus in Odenton to I-695 in Linthicum. Within that stretch, there are two sections that serve as intermodal passenger transport links: from its southern terminus to MD 32 in Odenton, and from MD 176 to MD 162 along the perimeter of BWI Airport. The portions from MD 32 in Odenton to MD 176 in Severn and from MD 162 to I-695 within Linthicum are National Highway System principal arterials.

== History ==
When the Maryland State Roads Commission applied numbers to state highways, they assigned MD 170 to its current corridor from Severn to Brooklyn Park and to what is now MD 174 from Severn to Fort Meade. The portion of the modern highway from Odenton to Severn was originally MD 554. Much of what was to become MD 170 was constructed along the Old Annapolis Road between Pumphrey and Severn. A portion of this road ran through the hamlet of Wellham Crossroads in the middle of what is now BWI Airport. The highway was paved in macadam from the Baltimore–Annapolis Boulevard in Pumphrey to Hammonds Ferry Road in Linthicum by 1910. A second section of improved highway was planned by 1910 from Linthicum south to Wellham Crossroads. A section of highway from the current MD 170–MD 174 intersection in Severn west to the Pennsylvania Railroad (now Amtrak's Northeast Corridor) was built as a 14-foot-wide (4.3 m) concrete road by 1915.

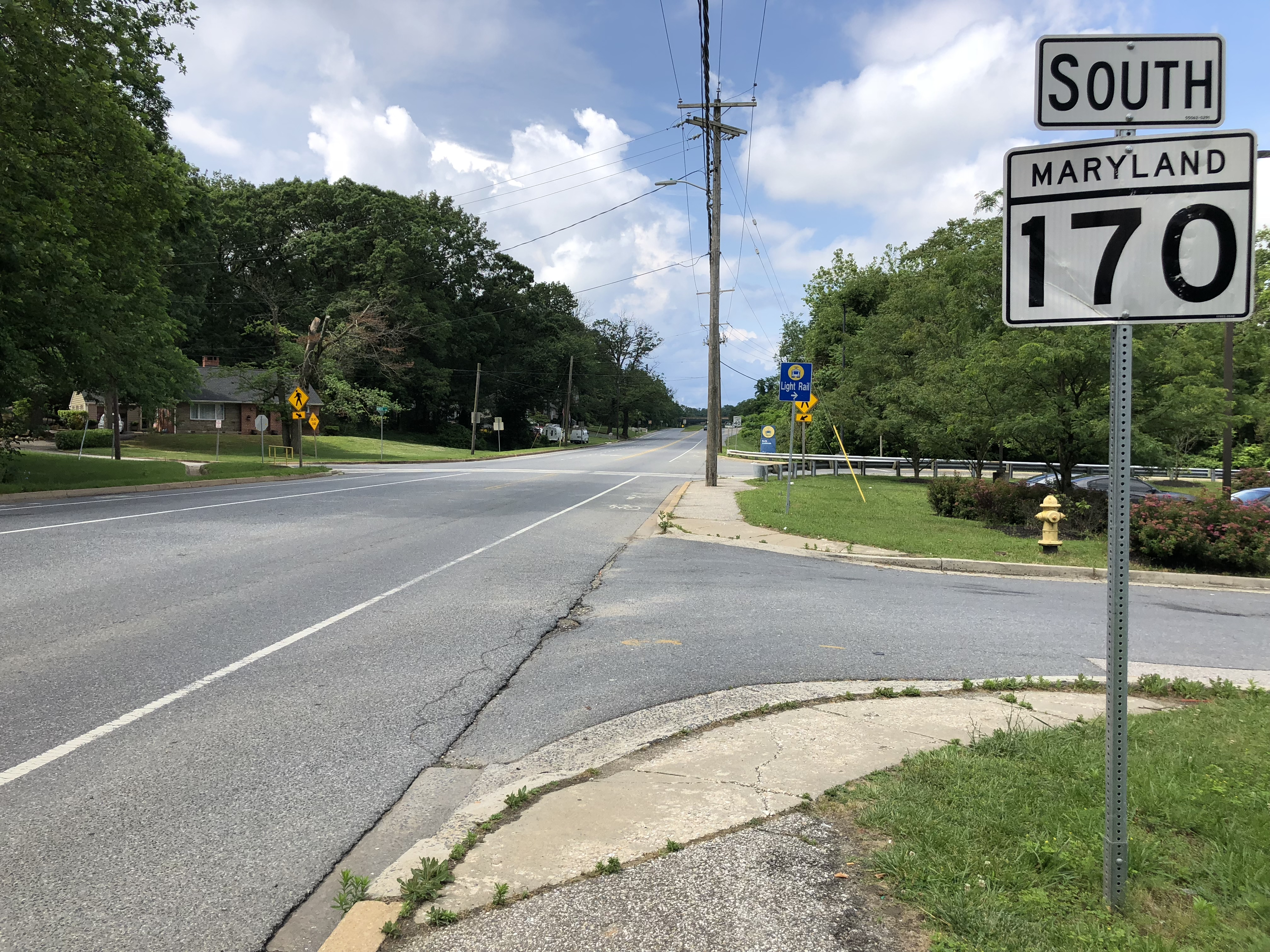
MD 170 southbound past MD 648 in Pumphrey

Construction on the highway from Severn to Linthicum became a high priority with the United States' entrance into World War I; the remainder of the Severn–Linthicum highway and the highway from the railroad at Severn southwest to newly established Camp Meade, now collectively called the Camp Meade Road, were paved in 14-to-16-foot-wide (4.3 to 4.9 m) concrete between 1916 and 1919. Belle Grove Road from Pumphrey to Brooklyn Park was also paved in concrete in this period of time. A poorly constructed portion of the Camp Meade Road between Wellham Crossroads and Dorsey Road was repaved with asphalt in 1919. MD 170 was relocated at the railroad crossing when the highway's overpass of the Pennsylvania Railroad was completed in 1931. The old road, which is now Severn Station Road west of the tracks and Old Camp Meade Road to the east, became MD 483.

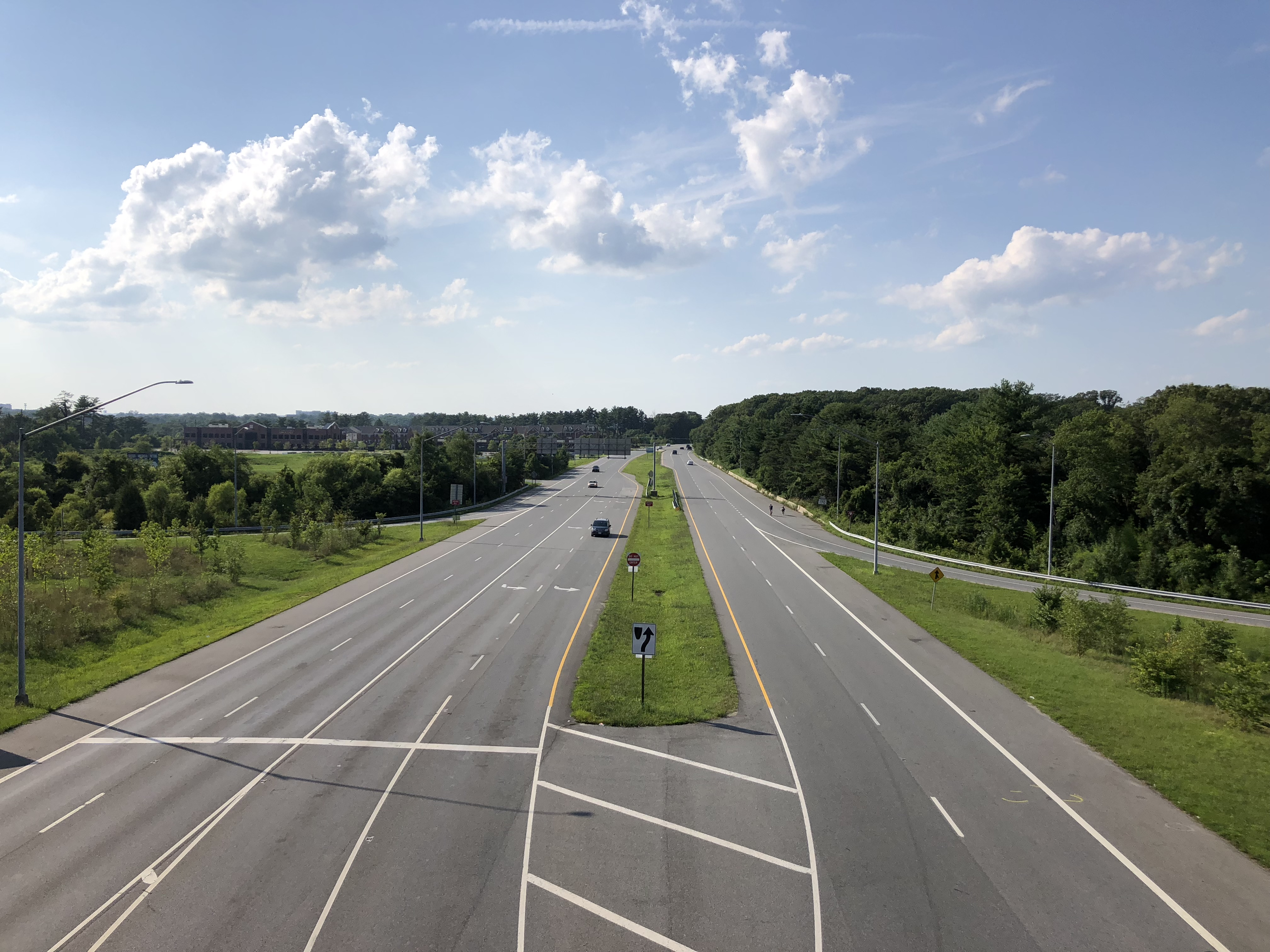
MD 170 northbound viewed from MD 100 in Severn

Telegraph Road from Severn to Odenton was built as a concrete road in three sections. The highway was constructed from the right-angle turn in the Camp Meade Road in Severn south to Evergreen Road in 1932 and 1933. Another section of MD 554 was completed from Odenton Road (then MD 180 and later MD 677) in Odenton to a point north of Old Mill Road in 1936. The gap in MD 554 was filled in or shortly after 1940. MD 170 was widened to 23 feet (7.0 m) from Brooklyn Park to Pumphrey in 1940. With the outbreak of World War II, MD 170 was designated a road of strategic importance to connect Baltimore with Fort Meade; the highway was reconstructed as a 24-foot-wide (7.3 m) asphalt-surfaced concrete road in 1942. By 1946, MD 170 and MD 554 had swapped numbers, with the former now the road from Severn to Odenton.

MD 170 was relocated as a 24-foot-wide (7.3 m) road from MD 176 north to what is now the MD 170–MD 162 junction in 1947 and 1948 to make way for the construction of Friendship International Airport. The highway's interchange with the Friendship International Airport Access Road, which was designated MD 46 and later became I-195, was started in 1950, the same year the airport opened, and completed in 1954. South of the airport, MD 170 ran concurrently with MD 176 from the current MD 176–MD 652 intersection west to current MD 170A, which the highway used to connect with the modern alignment of MD 170. The stub of MD 170 north from MD 176 to Friendship Cemetery on the airport reservation became MD 652. MD 170 assumed its present alignment west of MD 170A when the highway was relocated from MD 176 south to the site of the MD 100 interchange as the first carriageway of an ultimate divided highway between 1958 and 1960. The old alignment became much of current MD 652 and the portion of MD 652 north of MD 176 was transferred to county maintenance.

When the expressway spur between MD 168 and U.S. Route 301 (now MD 648) was built between 1951 and 1954, the expressway, which became part of the Baltimore Beltway, included an at-grade intersection with MD 170 between Linthicum and Pumphrey. This junction was replaced with the present interchange in 1967; MD 170 was expanded to a divided highway on either side of the interchange in 1968. MD 170's grade separation with Stoney Run Road on the west side of the airport was built in 1982. The state highway was expanded to a four-lane divided highway from north of I-195 to MD 162 when the adjacent east–west portion of MD 162 was built in 1988. MD 170 was expanded to a four-lane divided highway through its interchange with MD 100 when the single-point urban interchange was built in 1995. MD 170 had been expanded to four lanes through its interchange with MD 32 and from MD 176 through the I-195 interchange, and had its southern terminus rolled back from MD 677 to MD 175, by 1999.

== Junction list ==
The entire route is in Anne Arundel County.

Location	mi	km	Destinations	Notes
Odenton	0.00	0.00	MD 175 (Annapolis Road) / Piney Orchard Parkway south – Fort Meade, Millersville	Southern terminus
Odenton	0.96	1.54	MD 32 (Patuxent Freeway) – Fort Meade, Annapolis	MD 32 Exit 5
Severn	3.52	5.66	MD 174 (Reece Road/Donaldson Avenue) – Fort Meade, Glen Burnie	
Severn	4.41	7.10	MD 100 (Paul T. Pitcher Memorial Highway) to I-97 – Ellicott City, Washington, Glen Burnie, Annapolis	MD 100 Exit 11; single-point urban interchange
Harmans	5.18	8.34	MD 176 (Dorsey Road) – Glen Burnie	MD 170 joins Airport Loop
	6.50	10.46	Stoney Run Road – BWI Car Rental Facility	Intersection; Stoney Run Road crosses over MD 170
	7.05	11.35	MD 995 north (Amtrak Way) – BWI Rail Station	Southern terminus of MD 995; MD 995 is unsigned
	7.49	12.05	I-195 west (Metropolitan Boulevard) to MD 295 / I-95 – BWI Airport, Baltimore, Washington	I-195 Exit 1; eastern terminus of I-195
Linthicum	8.65	13.92	MD 162 south (Aviation Boulevard) to I-97 – Glen Burnie, Annapolis, Bay Bridge	Northern terminus of MD 162; MD 170 leaves Airport Loop
Linthicum	9.09	14.63	MD 762 south (Andover Road) / Andover Road west	Northern terminus of MD 762; MD 762 is unsigned
Linthicum	9.85	15.85	MD 169 (Maple Road)	
Linthicum	10.26	16.51	I-695 west (Baltimore Beltway) – Towson	I-695 Exit 6; no access from MD 170 to eastbound I-695 or from westbound I-695 to MD 170
Pumphrey	10.68	17.19	MD 648 (Baltimore–Annapolis Boulevard) – Ferndale, Lansdowne	
Brooklyn Park	12.98	20.89	MD 2 (Governor Ritchie Highway/Potee Street) / Hanover Street north – Baltimore, Glen Burnie	Northern terminus; Baltimore city limit
1.000 mi = 1.609 km; 1.000 km = 0.621 mi: Incomplete access

== Auxiliary route ==
MD 170A is the designation for the 0.29-mile (0.47 km) one-way ramp from westbound MD 176 to northbound MD 170 southwest of BWI Airport. The ramp is included in the clockwise direction of the Airport Loop and has a spur near its southern end. MD 170A, which has the official designation of MD 170 Spur, was assigned by 1999.
