= Maryland Route 713 =

State highway in Maryland, United States

Maryland Route 713
- Maryland Route 713 highlighted in red

Route information
- Maintained by MDSHA
- Length: 3.05 mi (4.91 km)
- Existed: 1946–present

Major junctions
- South end: Entrance to Fort Meade
- MD 175 near Fort Meade; MD 100 in Hanover
- North end: MD 176 in Hanover

Location
- Country: United States
- State: Maryland
- Counties: Anne Arundel

Highway system
- Maryland highway system; Interstate; US; State; Scenic Byways
← MD 712	→ MD 715

Maryland Route 713 (MD 713) is a state highway in the U.S. state of Maryland. The highway runs 3.05 miles (4.91 km) from an entrance to Fort George G. Meade north to MD 176 in Hanover in Anne Arundel County. In addition to serving as an access point to the U.S. Army installation, MD 713 provides the primary access to the Arundel Mills regional shopping mall and the Live! Casino & Hotel. MD 713 was constructed as part of MD 175 in the late 1920s and received its present designation in the mid-1940s. The northern end of the highway was relocated in the mid-1990s for the construction of MD 100 and modified again when Arundel Mills was built a few years later. One of MD 713's auxiliary routes connects the mall and casino with MD 295 via the first diverging diamond interchange in Maryland.

== Route description ==
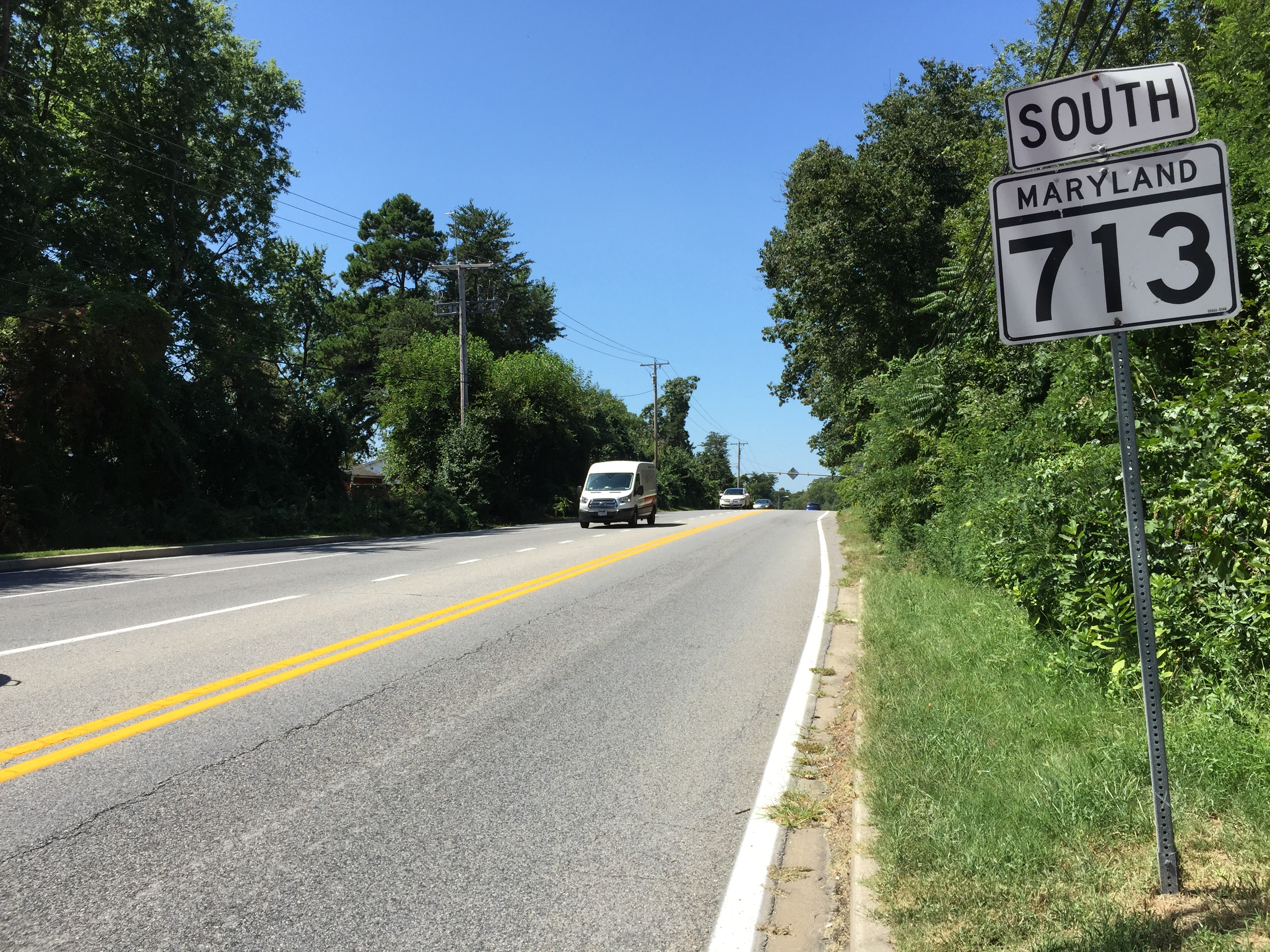
View south along MD 713 in Severn

MD 713 begins just north of the Rockenbach Road entrance to Fort Meade. The state highway heads north as a five-lane road with a center left-turn lane to its intersection with MD 175 (Annapolis Road) in the hamlet of Provinces. MD 713 heads north from MD 175 as two-lane undivided Ridge Road through residential subdivisions. At Stoney Run Drive, the state highway expands to a four-lane divided highway and enters a commercial area. MD 713 passes Ridge Chapel Road, part of the old alignment of MD 713, before reaching an intersection with Arundel Mills Boulevard, which heads southwest to an interchange with MD 295 (Baltimore–Washington Parkway), and Arundel Way, an entrance to Arundel Mills and the Live! Casino & Hotel. MD 713 turns north onto Arundel Mills Boulevard, a six-lane divided highway, toward an interchange with MD 100 (Paul T. Pitcher Memorial Highway). The state highway reaches its northern terminus just north of the MD 100 interchange at MD 176 (Dorsey Road). New Ridge Road continues straight as a county highway toward a collection of industrial and business parks in Hanover.

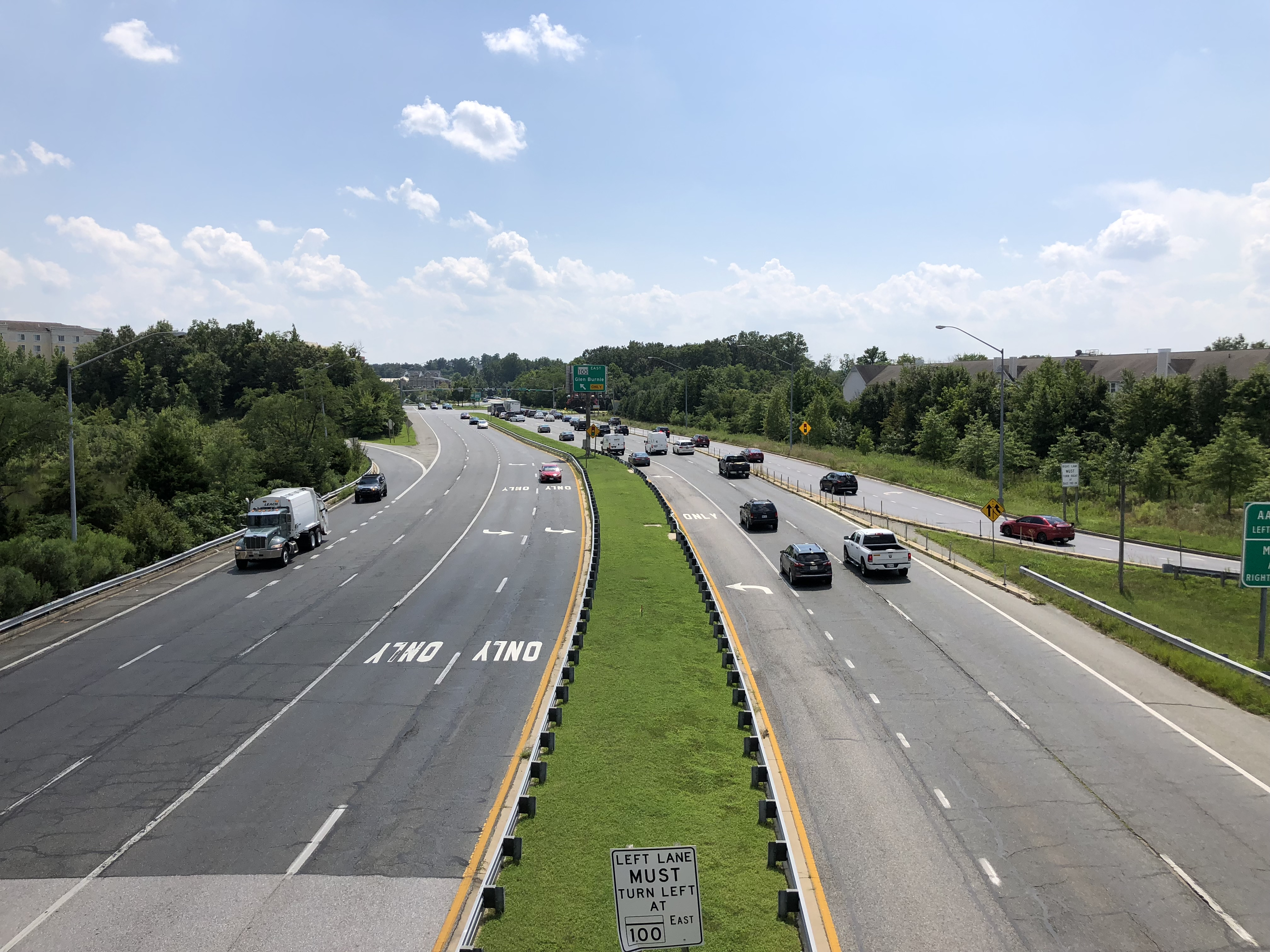
View south along MD 713 from MD 100 in Severn

== History ==
Ridge Road was constructed as a concrete road between Provinces and MD 176 in 1929. The highway was originally the easternmost part of MD 175. MD 713 was assigned to Ridge Road by 1946 after MD 175 had been extended southeast toward Odenton. MD 713 was widened between MD 175 and MD 176 in 1951. The highway was extended south from MD 175 to its present terminus at the entrance to Fort Meade in 1967. MD 713 was relocated and expanded to a multi-lane divided highway from south of Ridge Chapel Road to the intersection of New Ridge Road and Ridge Road north of MD 176 in 1995 in conjunction with the construction of MD 100 and the interchange between the two highways. A section of New Ridge Road remained part of MD 713 until the state highway was truncated at MD 176 in 1999. The old alignment of Ridge Road became part of MD 713B (Ridge Chapel Road) and all of MD 713C (Teague Road) south of MD 100, and MD 713D (Ridge Road) north of MD 100 to MD 176. The newly relocated section of MD 713 was relocated again in 2000 with the construction of Arundel Mills Boulevard to create a four-way intersection between the boulevard, the Ridge Road segment of MD 713, and an entrance to Arundel Mills, which opened the same year.

== Junction list ==
The entire route is in Anne Arundel County.

Location	mi	km	Destinations	Notes
Fort Meade	0.00	0.00	Rockenbach Road south – Fort Meade	Southern terminus
Fort Meade	0.49	0.79	MD 175 (Annapolis Road) – Jessup, Odenton	
Hanover	2.48	3.99	Arundel Mills Boulevard south to MD 295 (Baltimore–Washington Parkway) / Arundel Way west – Arundel Mills	MD 713 turns north onto Arundel Mills Boulevard
Hanover	2.86	4.60	MD 100 (Paul T. Pitcher Memorial Highway) – Glen Burnie, Ellicott City	MD 100 Exit 10
Hanover	3.05	4.91	MD 176 (Dorsey Road) / New Ridge Road north – Harmans, BWI Airport	Northern terminus
1.000 mi = 1.609 km; 1.000 km = 0.621 mi

== Auxiliary routes ==
MD 713 has five unsigned auxiliary routes and one former auxiliary route. MD 713A through 713E are associated with the construction of MD 100 through Hanover in the 1990s. MD 713F was assigned as part of the project to connect Arundel Mills Boulevard with MD 295.

- MD 713A was the designation for a 0.05-mile (0.080 km) state-maintained section of Clark Road west from MD 713 just south of Arundel Mills Boulevard. MD 713A was transferred to private ownership and removed from the state highway system in 2008.
- MD 713B is the designation for the L-shaped 0.26-mile (0.42 km) state-maintained portion of Ridge Chapel Road. The highway heads north from MD 713, then turns east at the southern end of MD 713C (Teague Road) and reaches its eastern terminus at an entrance to Harmans Park, which contains Joe Cannon Stadium, a local baseball venue named for Joseph Jerome Cannon, a major league baseball player who grew up in Anne Arundel County. The north–south part of MD 713B is the old alignment of MD 713.
- MD 713C is the designation for Teague Road, a 0.27-mile (0.43 km) section of the old alignment of MD 713 between MD 713B and a cul-de-sac adjacent to MD 100. MD 713C also provides access to Joe Cannon Stadium.
- MD 713D is the designation for Ridge Road, a 0.15-mile (0.24 km) section of the old alignment of MD 713 between a dead end adjacent to MD 100 and MD 176.
- MD 713E is the designation for the 0.17-mile (0.27 km) state-maintained section of Ridge Road on both sides of the road's intersection with New Ridge Road north of MD 176.
- MD 713F is the designation for the 0.09-mile (0.14 km) section of Arundel Mills Boulevard through its diverging diamond interchange with MD 295. The interchange was constructed as a dumbbell interchange in 2001 and designated MD 713F in 2002. The interchange was transformed into Maryland's first diverging diamond interchange in June 2012 to better serve the surge in traffic expected from the opening of the Maryland Live! casino at Arundel Mills that same month.
