= Maryland Route 162 =

State highway in Anne Arundel County, Maryland, known as Aviation Blvd

Maryland Route 162
- Aviation Boulevard
- Maryland Route 162 highlighted in red

Route information
- Maintained by MDSHA
- Length: 2.31 mi (3.72 km)
- Existed: 1987–present

Major junctions
- South end: MD 176 near Ferndale
- I-97 near Ferndale
- North end: MD 170 in Linthicum

Location
- Country: United States
- State: Maryland
- Counties: Anne Arundel

Highway system
- Maryland highway system; Interstate; US; State; Scenic Byways
← MD 161	→ MD 165

Maryland Route 162 (MD 162) is a state highway in the U.S. state of Maryland. Known as Aviation Boulevard, the highway runs 2.31 miles (3.72 km) from MD 176 near Ferndale north to MD 170 in Linthicum in northern Anne Arundel County. MD 162 forms the eastern portion of the Airport Loop that circumscribes Baltimore/Washington International Thurgood Marshall Airport (BWI Airport) and connects the airport with Interstate 97 (I-97). Most of what is now MD 162 was Maryland Route 167 in the late 1960s and early 1970s; MD 167 previously had been assigned to a different portion of Hammonds Ferry Road in Linthicum from the 1930s to the early 1960s. MD 162 was assigned along the length of MD 167's second route in the late 1980s and immediately relocated at its northern end. The remainder of the highway was expanded to a divided highway in the 1990s.

== Route description ==
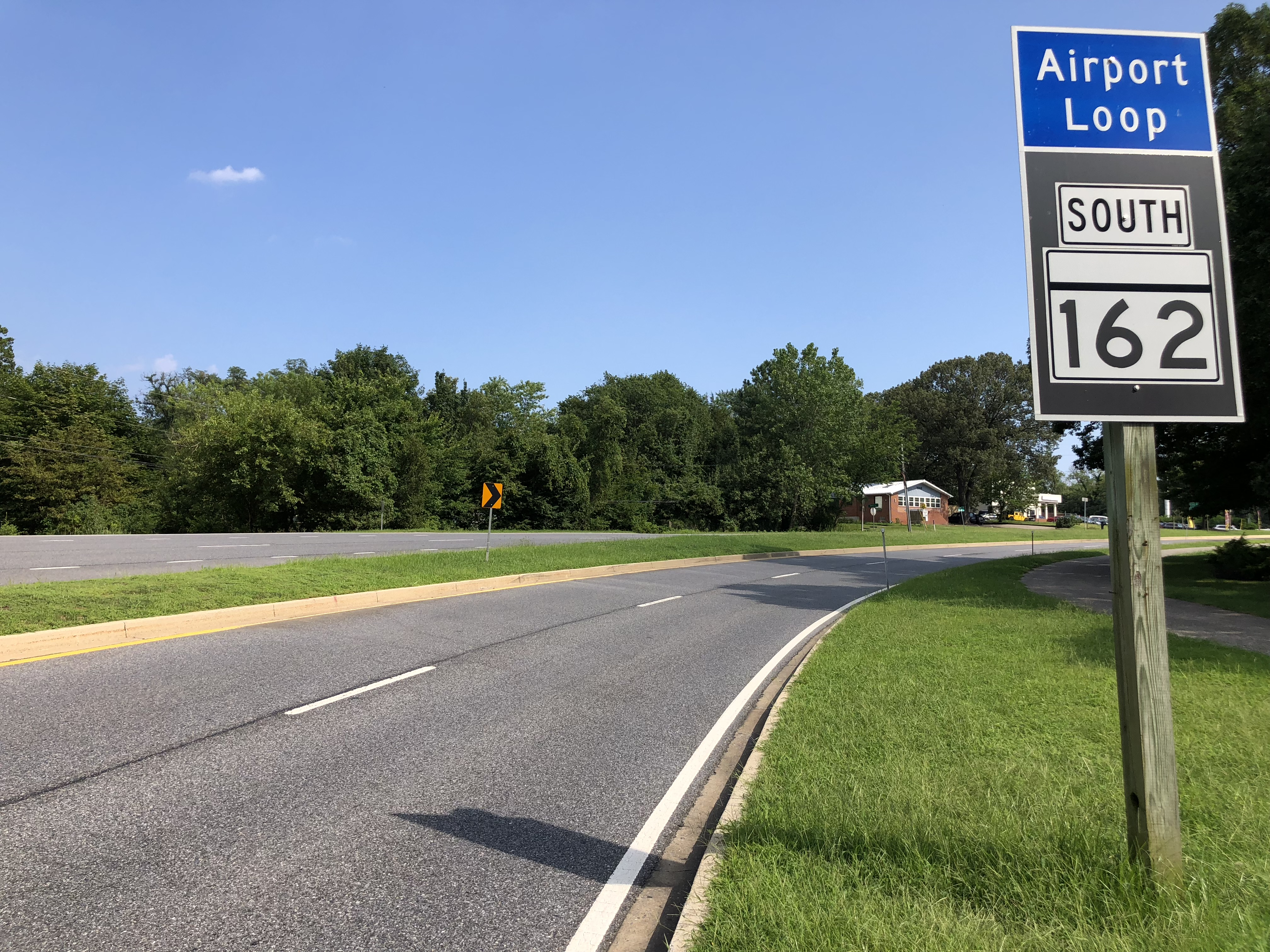
View south along MD 162 at MD 762 in Linthicum

MD 162 begins at an intersection with MD 176 (Dorsey Road) and Stewart Avenue, which forms the southern leg of the intersection, at the southeastern corner of the BWI Airport property south of Ferndale. Eastbound MD 176 provides full access to I-97 and westbound MD 176 forms a continuation of Airport Loop. MD 162 heads north as a five-lane divided highway, with three lanes northbound and two lanes southbound, and follows the eastern boundary of the airport property. The highway's first intersection is with Cromwell Park Drive, which is unsigned MD 162A and has a right-in/right-out interchange with southbound I-97. North of the intersection, MD 162 temporarily expands to six lanes before reducing to four lanes. The highway passes to the west of an industrial park before forming the western edge of a residential subdivision. At the northern end of the subdivision, MD 162 makes a curve to the west, within which it intersects Andover Road, which heads north as MD 762 and south to the historic Benson-Hammond House. The highway passes between a pair of long-term parking lots and crosses Cabin Branch before reaching its northern terminus at MD 170, which heads north through Linthicum as Camp Meade Road toward I-695. Aviation Boulevard and Airport Loop continue west along the other direction of MD 170 toward MD 295 and the main airport entrance.

MD 162 is a part of the National Highway System as an intermodal connector for its entire length.

== History ==
Maryland Route 167
- Location: Ferndale–Linthicum
- Existed: 1929–1974

MD 162 follows the path of what was once the southernmost portion of Hammonds Ferry Road. The portion of Hammonds Ferry Road through Linthicum from MD 170 to the bridge across the Patapsco River was built as a 16-foot (4.9 m) wide concrete road in 1929 and later marked as MD 167. The MD 167 portion of Hammonds Ferry Road was transferred back to county maintenance in 1961 or 1962. MD 167 was reassigned to Hammonds Ferry Road from MD 176 to MD 170 in 1969. The highway reverted to a county road again in 1973 or 1974. The highway was relocated to its present alignment south of what is now Cromwell Park Drive by 1978. MD 162 was assigned to Hammonds Ferry Road from MD 176 to MD 170 in 1987; the northernmost portion of this stretch included what is now MD 762. The east–west portion of the highway that now forms its northernmost portion was built as a county highway around 1970 and reconstructed as a four-lane divided highway in 1988. MD 162 and MD 170 on the perimeter of the airport had their names changed to Aviation Boulevard (from Hammonds Ferry Road and Camp Meade Road, respectively) by 1991. The highway was expanded to a multi-lane divided highway from MD 762 south to the southern edge of the residential subdivision in 1993 and to MD 176 by 1999.

== Junction list ==
The entire route is in Anne Arundel County.

Location	mi	km	Destinations	Notes
Ferndale	0.00	0.00	MD 176 (Dorsey Road) to I-97 – Glen Burnie, Dorsey	Southern terminus; Airport Loop continues on westbound MD 176
Ferndale	0.32	0.51	Cromwell Park Drive east to I-97 south – Annapolis, Bay Bridge	Cromwell Park Drive is unsigned MD 162A
Linthicum	1.83	2.95	MD 762 north (Andover Road)	Southern terminus of MD 762; MD 762 is unsigned
Linthicum	2.31	3.72	MD 170 (Camp Meade Road/Aviation Boulevard) to I-695 west / MD 295 – BWI Airport, Baltimore, Washington	Northern terminus; Airport Loop continues on southbound MD 170
1.000 mi = 1.609 km; 1.000 km = 0.621 mi

== Auxiliary route ==
MD 162A is the designation for the 0.20-mile (0.32 km) portion of four-lane divided Cromwell Park Drive from MD 162 east to a right-in/right-out interchange with southbound I-97. Cromwell Park Drive continues north as a county-maintained highway into an industrial park. MD 162A was assigned to the entirety of Cromwell Park Drive in 1999. The portion of the road north of the I-97 ramps was transferred to county maintenance in 2002.
