= Interstate 195 (Maryland) =

Highway in Maryland

Interstate 195
- Metropolitan Boulevard
- I-195 highlighted in red

Route information
- Auxiliary route of I-95
- Maintained by MDSHA
- Length: 4.35 mi (7.00 km)
- Existed: 1990–present
- NHS: Entire route
- Restrictions: No trucks east of exit 1A

Major junctions
- West end: MD 166 in Arbutus
- I-95 in Arbutus; US 1 in Arbutus; MD 295 in Linthicum
- East end: MD 170 in Linthicum

Location
- Country: United States
- State: Maryland
- Counties: Baltimore, Anne Arundel

Highway system
- Interstate Highway System; Main; Auxiliary; Suffixed; Business; Future; Maryland highway system; Interstate; US; State; Scenic Byways
← MD 194	→ MD 195

Interstate 195 (I-195) is an auxiliary Interstate Highway in the US state of Maryland. The highway runs 4.35 miles (7.00 km) from I-95 in Arbutus, Baltimore County, east to Maryland Route 170 (MD 170) near the Baltimore/Washington International Airport (BWI Airport) in Linthicum, Anne Arundel County. I-195, which is also known as Metropolitan Boulevard, is the main connection between the airport terminal and highways leading to Baltimore, Washington, D.C., and Annapolis, including I-95, MD 295, and I-97. The interchange with MD 170, which forms part of the Airport Loop, provides access to various airport-related services. I-195 also links I-95 with Catonsville and the University of Maryland, Baltimore County (UMBC), via a westward continuation of Metropolitan Boulevard that is part of MD 166.

I-195 was constructed in three sections. The first section was a connection between MD 295 and the airport. This segment was built as Maryland Route 46 (MD 46) and completed in 1951 shortly after the opening of the airport, which was originally named Friendship International Airport. The second segment was completed at the opposite end of the highway in the mid-1970s, connecting U.S. Route 1 (US 1) and I-95 with MD 166 and UMBC. The first two segments were connected when the portion between MD 295 and US 1 was constructed in the late 1980s. The whole length of the highway was completed and was marked as I-195 in 1990. In 2015, the eastern terminus was cut back from the airport to MD 170, with the former section between those two points becoming MD 995A.

== Route description ==
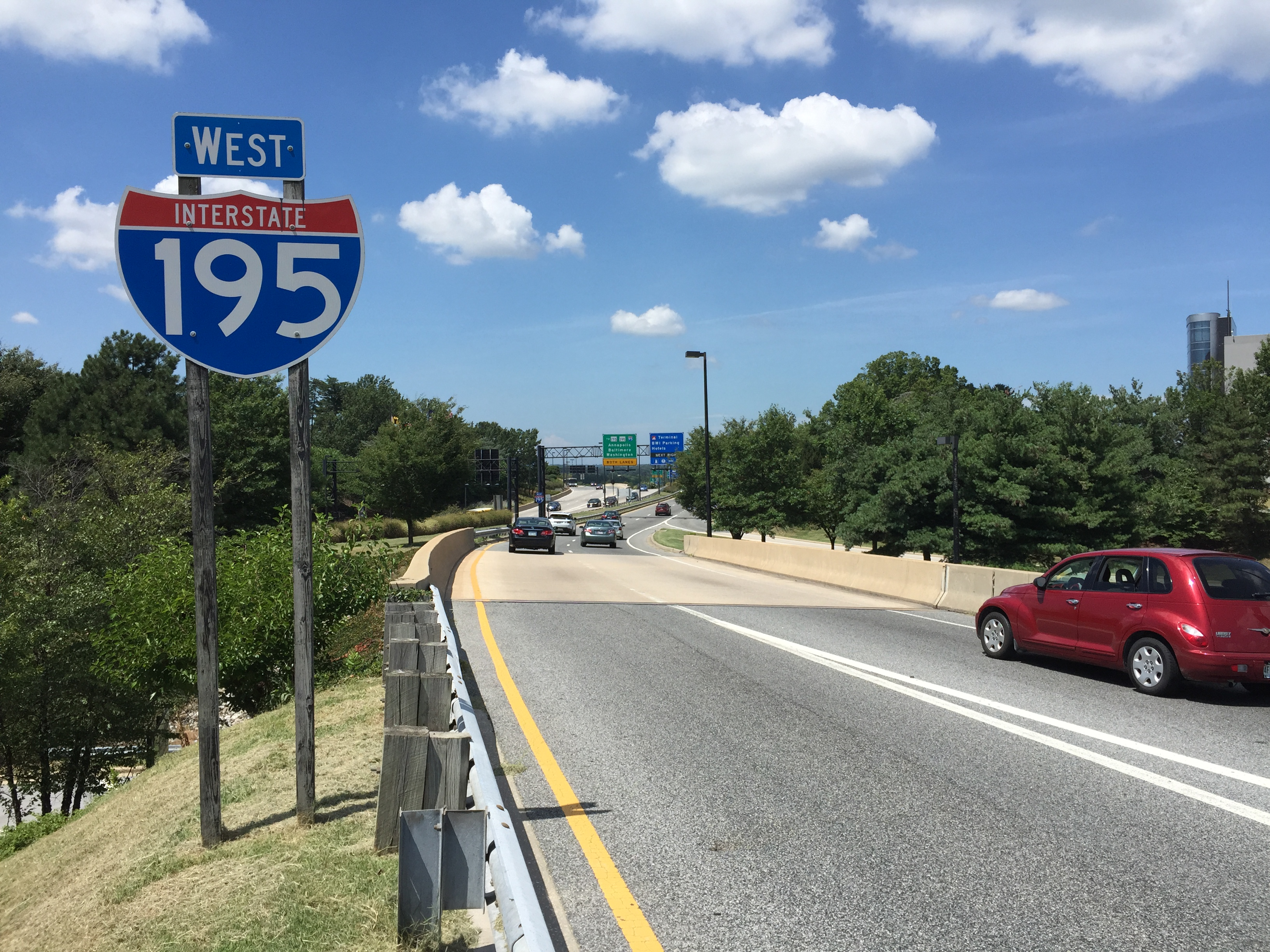
View west from the east end of I-195 at BWI Airport

I-195 begins at the western edge of its interchange with I-95. The freeway continues west as MD 166, which has a partial interchange for UMBC Boulevard, which leads to the UMBC campus, before ending next to a park-and-ride facility at Rolling Road, on which MD 166 continues north toward Catonsville. The I-95 interchange is a combination interchange that has flyover ramps from northbound I-95 to westbound I-195 and from southbound I-95 to eastbound I-195. I-195 heads southeast as a four-lane freeway with a speed limit of 60 mph (97 km/h) across CSX Transportation's Baltimore Terminal Subdivision railroad line and meets US 1 at a four-ramp partial cloverleaf interchange. The highway crosses over I-895 (Harbor Tunnel Thruway) with no access and curves south on a viaduct to cross the Patapsco River, where the freeway passes from Baltimore County to Anne Arundel County, and Amtrak's Northeast Corridor railroad line, which also carries MARC Train's Penn Line. I-195 parallels the railroad south to its combination interchange with MD 295 (Baltimore–Washington Parkway), which contains a flyover ramp from southbound MD 295 to eastbound I-195.

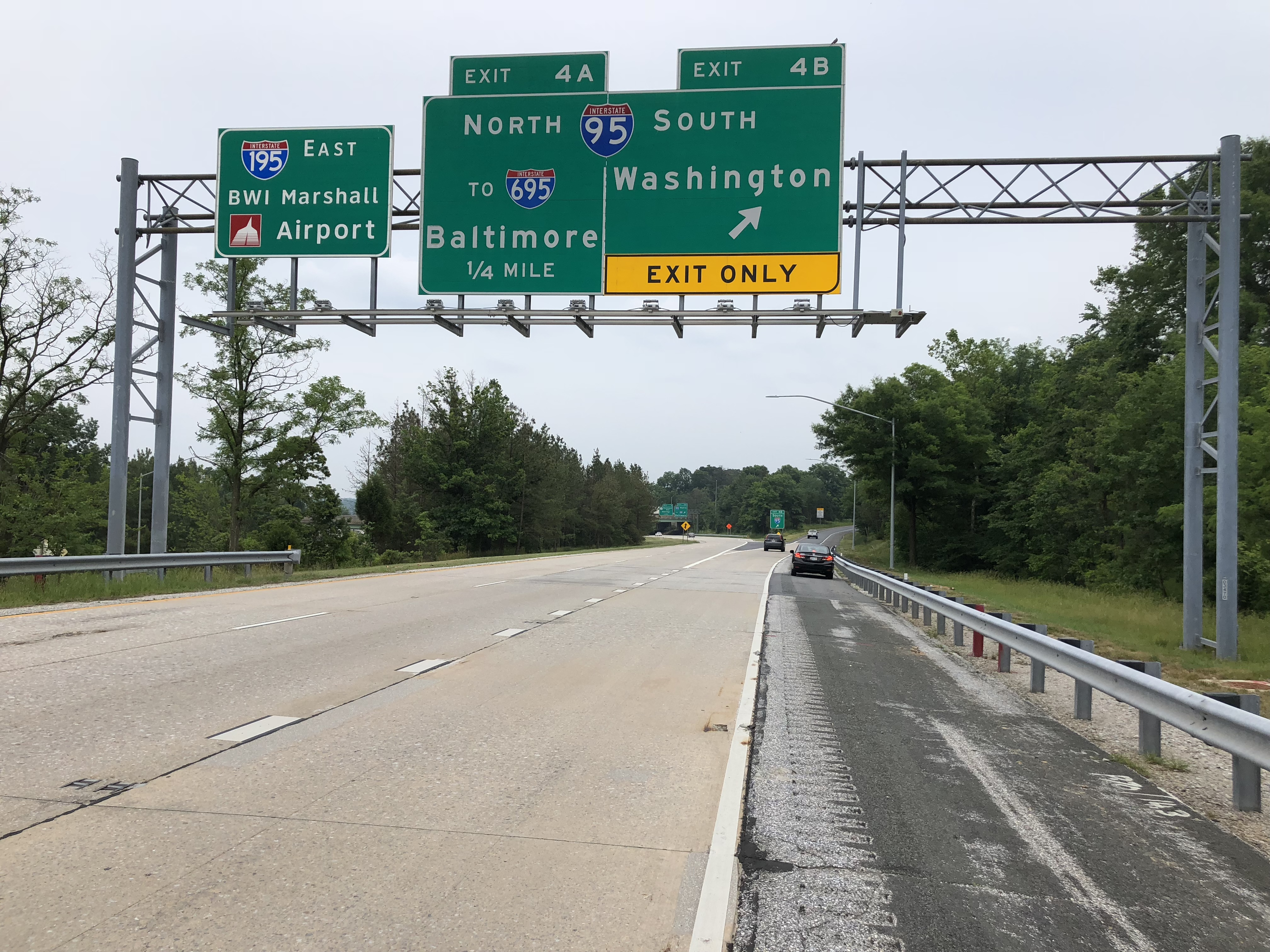
I-195 eastbound at I-95 in Arbutus

I-195 curves southeast and passes under the BWI Trail ahead of its partial cloverleaf interchange with MD 170 (Aviation Boulevard), also known as the Airport Loop. The Airport Loop provides access to long-term parking lots, the consolidated rental car facility, hotels, cargo and general aviation facilities, and BWI Rail Station serving Amtrak and MARC Train. The circumferential highway also provides indirect access to I-97 for traffic heading to Annapolis or the Chesapeake Bay Bridge. At this interchange, I-195 ends and the roadway continues toward the entrance to BWI Airport. It is signed as an east–west highway, even though it travels in a north–south direction.

Like all Interstates, I-195 is a part of the National Highway System for its entire length.

== History ==
Maryland Route 46
- Location: Linthicum
- Existed: 1950–1990

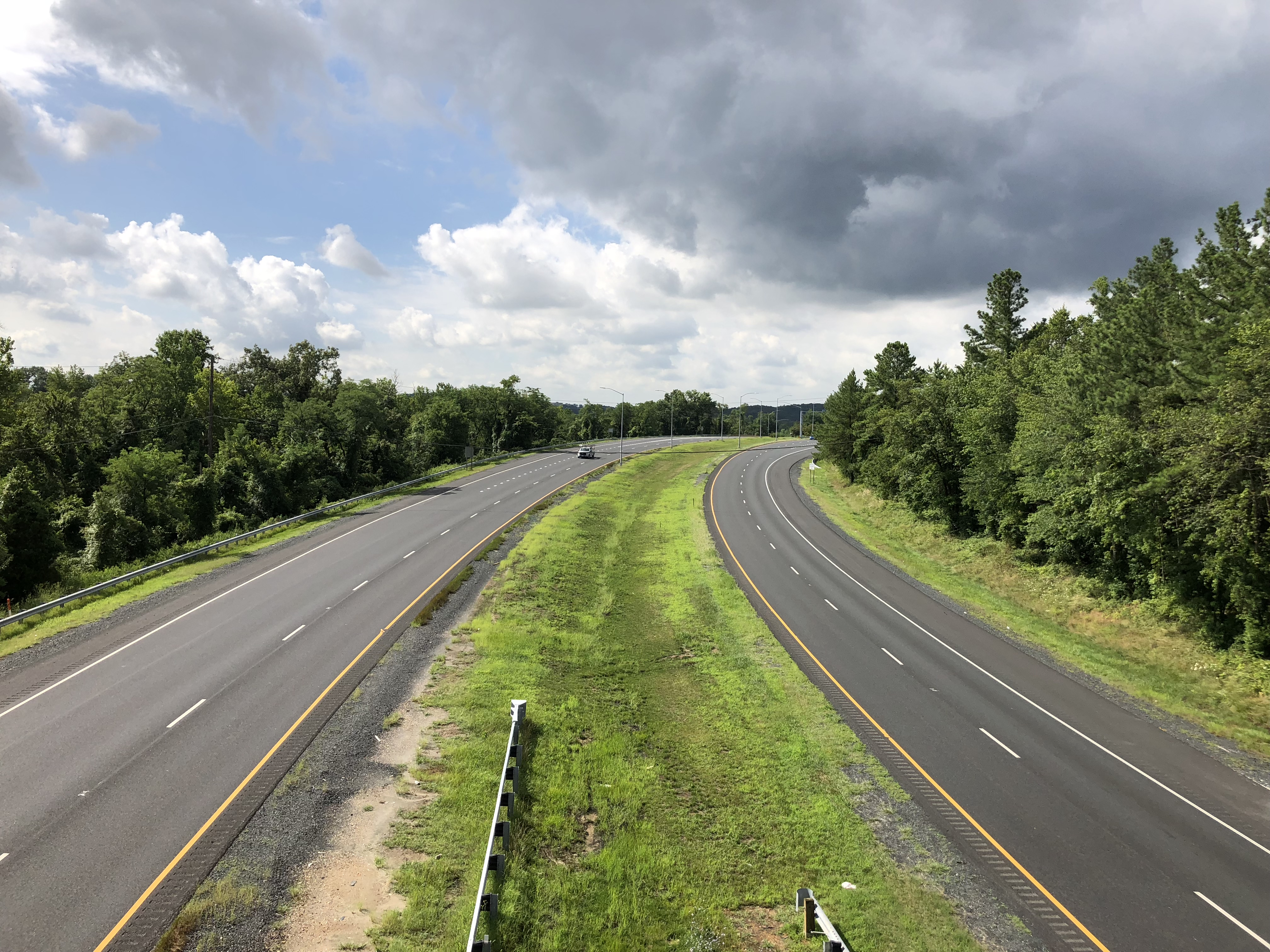
View east along I-195 from Cedar Avenue in Arbutus

Friendship International Airport was constructed between 1947 and 1950 as the new primary airport for Baltimore. To directly connect the airport with Baltimore, an access road was planned to link the new Baltimore–Washington Expressway, later designated MD 295, with the airport terminal. The first portion of the Friendship International Airport Access Road was completed from a full Y interchange at the expressway to an interchange with MD 170 in October 1949 and designated MD 46. The access road was completed from MD 170 to the airport terminal in July 1951, about the same time the expressway was completed between MD 46 and Downtown Baltimore. The remainder of what is now I-195 was planned as early as 1969, when the portion of Metropolitan Boulevard north of US 1 was placed under construction. The freeway opened from the US 1 ramps northwest through the I-95 interchange to an intersection with Sulphur Spring Road just south of the modern Selford Road overpass in August 1974. The freeway was extended to its present terminus at Rolling Road and the ramps to UMBC Boulevard were constructed in 1975. Metropolitan Boulevard south of the I-95 interchange was marked as a second segment of MD 46 from when it opened. North of I-95, the freeway was marked as a relocation of MD 166. That segment of MD 46 was renumbered as an extension of MD 166 by 1981.

The missing connection between US 1 and MD 295 resulted in a circuitous path for traffic between I-95 and BWI Airport. In 1974, that route involved exiting I-95 at MD 100, which then served as a connector between the Interstate and US 1. Traffic took US 1 south to MD 176, then took MD 176 east to MD 295 and north to the western end of MD 46. Construction on the missing link, which, by then, was planned as part of I-195, began in 1987, when the highway's bridges over US 1 and I-895 were constructed. The remainder of the highway from MD 295 to the I-895 overpass was completed, including reconstruction of the interchange with MD 295, and the intermediate section opened in June 1990. The I-195 designation was applied to the highway's present length at the same time, and MD 166 was truncated to its present southern terminus.

In 2002, as part of an expansion project at the airport, several ramps were constructed, providing access to parking lots and facilitating an easier U-turn for motorists who were leaving the terminal but wished to return. In 2015, the eastern terminus of I-195 was truncated from BWI Airport to the MD 170 interchange, and the section of road between those two points was designated as MD 995A. MD 995A was transferred to the Maryland Aviation Administration in an agreement dated December 10, 2019.

== Exit list ==
County	Location	mi	km	Exit	Destinations	Notes
Baltimore	Arbutus	0.00	0.00	—	MD 166 north – Catonsville	Western terminus; Metropolitan Boulevard continues north as MD 166; serves UMBC
Baltimore	Arbutus	0.40	0.64	4	I-95 to I-695 – Baltimore, Washington	Signed as exits 4A (north) and 4B (south)
Baltimore	Arbutus	1.57	2.53	3	US 1 (Washington Boulevard) – Elkridge	Serves Halethorpe station and Saint Denis station
Anne Arundel	Linthicum	3.10	4.99	2	MD 295 (Baltimore–Washington Parkway) to I-695 – Baltimore, Washington	Signed as exits 2A (north) and 2B (south); I-695 not signed eastbound
Anne Arundel	Linthicum	4.17	6.71	1	MD 170 to I-97 – Odenton, Linthicum, Annapolis, Rental Car Return, BWI Rail Station	Signed as exits 1A (north) and 1B (south) eastbound; I-97 not signed eastbound; also serves BWI Business District station
Anne Arundel	Linthicum	4.35	7.00	—	BWI Airport	Eastern terminus; Metropolitan Boulevard continues east
1.000 mi = 1.609 km; 1.000 km = 0.621 mi
