= Ferndale, Maryland =

- Census-designated place
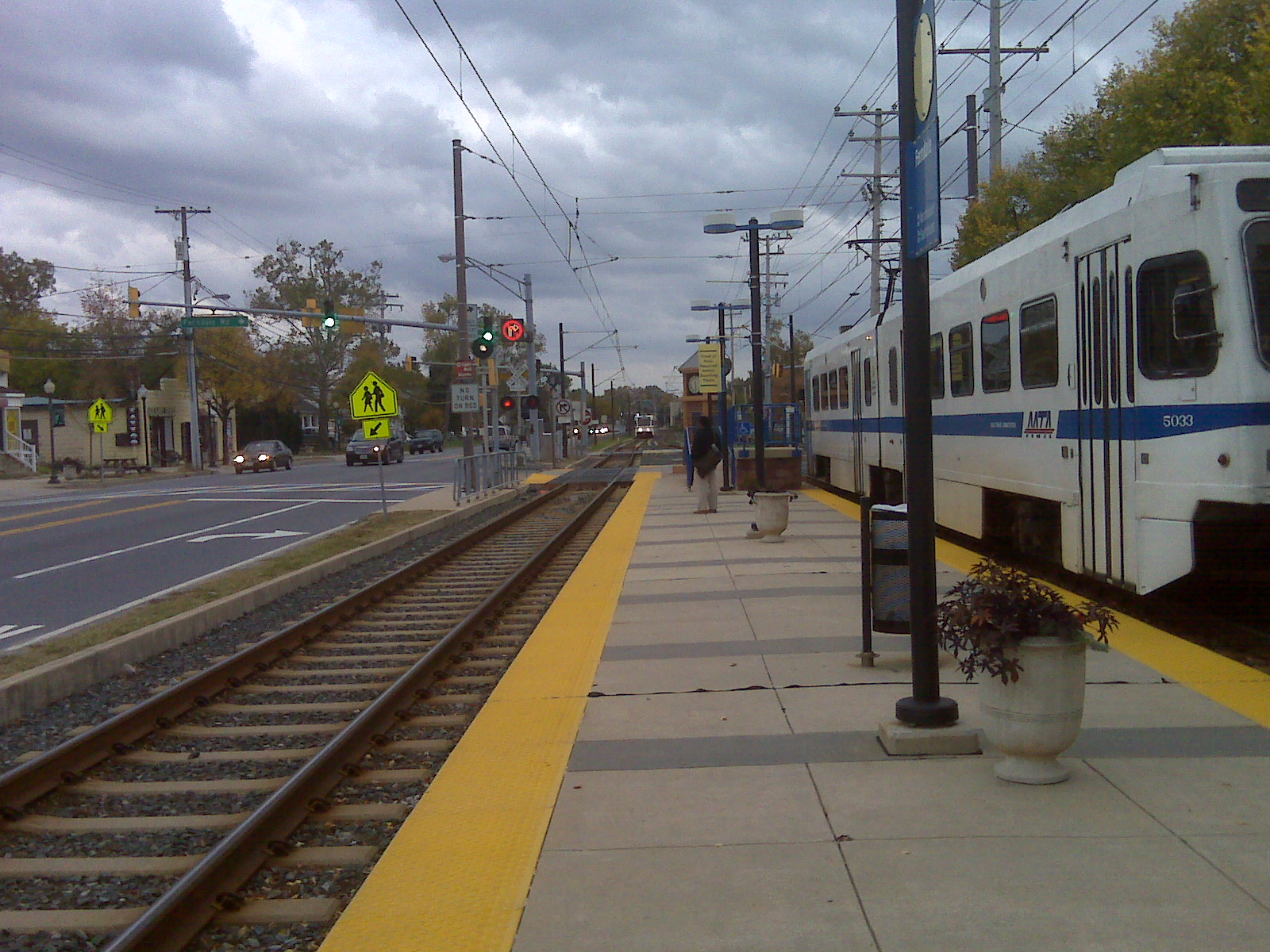
- Ferndale Station platform.

- Location of Ferndale, Maryland
- Country: United States
- State: Maryland
- County: Anne Arundel

Area
  - Total: 3.96 sq mi (10.25 km^{2})
  - Land: 3.96 sq mi (10.25 km^{2})
  - Water: 0 sq mi (0.00 km^{2})
- Elevation: 79 ft (24 m)

Population (2020)
  - Total: 17,091
  - Density: 4,319.7/sq mi (1,667.83/km^{2})
- Time zone: UTC-5 (Eastern (EST))
  - Summer (DST): UTC-4 (EDT)
- FIPS code: 24-28075
- GNIS feature ID: 0590203

Ferndale is a census-designated place (CDP) in Anne Arundel County, Maryland, United States. At the 2020 census, the population was 17,091.

== Geography ==
Ferndale is located at 39°11′17″N 76°38′9″W (39.188065, -76.635810) in northern Anne Arundel County, 5 miles (8 km) south of the Baltimore city line. The Ferndale CDP is bounded by Interstate 695 (the Baltimore Beltway) and Cabin Branch (a stream) to the north, by Maryland Route 162 (Aviation Boulevard) to the west, by Maryland Route 176 (Dorsey Road) and 8th Avenue to the south, and by Maryland Route 2 (Governor Ritchie Highway) to the east. Neighboring communities are Linthicum to the northwest, Brooklyn Park to the northeast, and Glen Burnie to the east and south. Baltimore–Washington International Thurgood Marshall Airport is to the west across Aviation Boulevard.

According to the United States Census Bureau, the CDP has a total area of 3.96 square miles (10.3 km^{2}), all land.

=== Climate ===
The climate in this area is characterized by hot, humid summers and generally mild to cool winters. According to the Köppen Climate Classification system, Ferndale has a humid subtropical climate, abbreviated "Cfa" on climate maps.

== Demographics ==
Historical population
Census	Pop.	Note	%±
2000	16,056		—
2010	16,746		4.3%
2020	17,091		2.1%
U.S. Census, Ferndale CDP

=== 2020 census ===
As of the 2020 census, Ferndale had a population of 17,091. The population density was 4,319.2 inhabitants per square mile (1,667.7/km^{2}). There were 6,707 housing units at an average density of 1,693.7 per square mile (653.9/km^{2}), of which 5.2% were vacant.

The median age was 36.3 years. 23.5% of residents were under the age of 18 and 14.4% of residents were 65 years of age or older. For every 100 females there were 93.9 males, and for every 100 females age 18 and over there were 91.7 males age 18 and over.

100.0% of residents lived in urban areas, while 0.0% lived in rural areas.

There were 6,359 households in Ferndale, of which 33.1% had children under the age of 18 living in them. Of all households, 42.0% were married-couple households, 18.8% were households with a male householder and no spouse or partner present, and 30.9% were households with a female householder and no spouse or partner present. About 24.8% of all households were made up of individuals, 10.2% had someone living alone who was 65 years of age or older, and 30.9% were non-family households. The average household size was 2.61 and the average family size was 3.20.

Racial composition as of the 2020 census
Race	Number	Percent
White	9,664	56.5%
Black or African American	3,760	22.0%
American Indian and Alaska Native	101	0.6%
Asian	855	5.0%
Native Hawaiian and Other Pacific Islander	21	0.1%
Some other race	1,191	7.0%
Two or more races	1,499	8.8%
Hispanic or Latino (of any race)	2,065	12.1%

=== Income and poverty ===
The median household income was $92,391 and the median family income was $109,552. Males had a median income of $72,373 and females $55,938. The per capita income was $38,750. About 4.5% of families and 4.6% of the population were below the poverty line, including 6.7% of those under age 18 and 2.9% of those age 65 or over.
