= Harmans, Maryland =

Unincorporated community in Maryland, United States

- Unincorporated community
- Location within the state of Maryland Harmans, Maryland (the United States)
- Coordinates: 39°09′26″N 76°41′48″W
- Country: United States
- State: Maryland
- County: Anne Arundel
- Established: 1877
- Elevation: 128 ft (39 m)
- Time zone: UTC-5 (Eastern (EST))
  - Summer (DST): UTC-4 (EDT)
- ZIP code: 21077
- Area codes: 410,443 and 667

Harmans is an unincorporated community in Anne Arundel County, Maryland, United States. Amtrak's Northeast Corridor high-speed rail line runs through the community; however, Amtrak and MARC trains do not stop as there is no station.
