= Hanover, Maryland =

- Unincorporated community
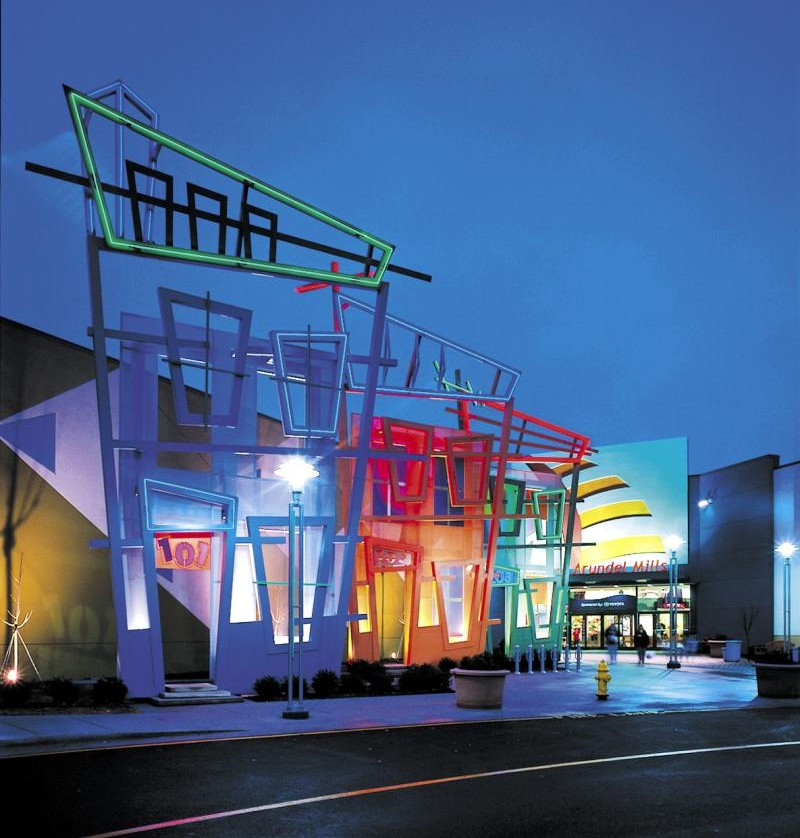
- Arundel Mills Mall in Hanover

- Location within the state of Maryland Hanover (the United States)
- Coordinates: 39°11′34″N 76°43′27″W
- Country: United States
- State: Maryland
- County: Anne Arundel
- Established: April 30, 1862

Population (2010)
  - Total: 12,952
  - Density: 2,720/sq mi (1,049/km^{2})
- Time zone: UTC-5 (Eastern (EST))
  - Summer (DST): UTC-4 (EDT)
- ZIP Code: 21076
- Area codes: 410, 443

Hanover is an unincorporated community in the Baltimore/Annapolis area in northwestern Anne Arundel County and eastern Howard County in the U.S. state of Maryland, south of Baltimore.

The community is approximately at the intersection of Maryland State Highway 100 and the Baltimore–Washington Parkway. It is part of the Baltimore-Washington Metropolitan Combined Statistical Area and is just southwest of the Baltimore-Washington International Thurgood Marshall Airport ("BWI"). It is bordered by Severn to the south, Linthicum to the east, and Elkridge to the north and west.

== History ==
In the past, the community also consisted of "Anderson", a post office stop founded along the B&O railroad tracks from 1874–1881 along modern Anderson Avenue, which operated as "Hanoverville" until December 1896.

Hanover is along the fall line where the ocean met the shore in prehistoric times. Native American tribes lived along the lower Patapsco River. Archeological digs in 1929 have discovered arrowheads, spearpoints, axes, and gorgets along the Disney farm. The area is now occupied by commercial buildings along Hi Tech drive and Oxford Square development.

Arundel Mills mall opened in 2000. Since then, the area has seen explosive growth; shopping centers and housing developments have popped up along Arundel Mills Boulevard (Route 713), which links the B-W Parkway and Route 100 to Arundel Mills. In 2010, Preston Partners sought to rezone a failed commercial project on the historic Disney farm into a transit-oriented development funded by Magic Johnson. On November 2, 2010, Anne Arundel County voters approved zoning for a gaming and entertainment complex with 4,750 slot machines at Arundel Mills Mall. This casino complex opened as Maryland Live! in 2012. The Maryland Department of Transportation is headquartered at 7201 Corporate Center Drive, which has a Hanover address. Amazon has operated a distribution warehouse in Hanover since 2018.

== Demographics ==
Historical population
Census	Pop.	Note	%±
1990	9,572		—
2000	11,083		15.8%
2010	12,952		16.9%

According to the 2014–2018 American Community Survey by the United States Census Bureau, Hanover has a median household income of $116,098. 49% of the residents are white, 28% are Black or African-American, 13% are Asian, 5% are Hispanic, and 5% of residents are two or more races. Hanover has the largest percentage of Asian-Americans of any community in Anne Arundel County.

In 2017, Hanover was named one of the 50 most expensive ZIP codes in Maryland, ranking 44th. Hanover was the sixth-most expensive ZIP code in Anne Arundel County, behind Gibson Island, West River, Davidsonville, Severna Park, and Gambrills.

== Schools ==
Hanover is served by the Anne Arundel County Public Schools and Howard County Public Schools systems.

Howard County

- Hanover Hills Elementary School (Grades K-5)
- Thomas Viaduct Middle School (Grades 6-8)
- Long Reach High School (Grades 9-12)

Anne Arundel County

- Frank Hebron Harman Elementary School (Grades K-5)
- Macarthur Middle School (Grades 6-8)
- Severn Run High School (Grades 9-12)
- Lindale Middle School (Grades 6-8) (For Magnet Program only, must be accepted through application)
- Brooklyn Park Middle School (Grades 6-8) (For Magnet Program only, must be accepted through application)
- Annapolis High School (Grades 9-12) (For Magnet Program only, must be accepted through application)
- Broadneck High School (Grades 9-12) (For Magnet Program only, must be accepted through application)
- Glen Burnie High School (Grades 9-12) (For Magnet Program only, must be accepted through application)
- North County High School (Grades 9-12) (For Magnet Program only, must be accepted through application)

== Real estate developments ==
- Arundel Mills Mall and Maryland Live! casino
- Hawks Ridge/Forest Ridge, a large community with medium and large single family homes, constructed by Ryan Homes from the 1990s – mid 2000s.
- Dorsey Ridge Luxury Apartments and Villas – opened in 2013
- Parkside Townhomes
- Stoney Run Garden condominiums
- Villages of Dorchester, a residential development
- Arundel Preserve, a mixed-use development that at completion will include about two million square feet of office space, 500 apartments, 440 homes, 300,000 square feet (30,000 m^{2}) of retail space, and two hotels near Arundel Mills mall.
- Ridge Forest, constructed by Ryan Homes in the 1990s
- Ridgefield I and II, constructed by Rice Homes and Washington Homes in the late 1970s and early 1980s
- Ridgewood, constructed by Washington Homes in the early 1980s featuring homes with 1-acre (4,000 m^{2}) lots
- Shipley Homestead, a residential development
- Ridge Retreat, constructed by Baldwin Homes from 2019 to 2020
