= Maryland Route 10 =

State highway in Anne Arundel County, Maryland, US, known as the Arundel Expressway

Maryland Route 10
- Arundel Expressway
- Maryland Route 10 highlighted in red

Route information
- Maintained by MDSHA
- Length: 7.17 mi (11.54 km)
- Existed: 1972–present

Major junctions
- South end: MD 2 in Pasadena
- MD 100 in Pasadena; MD 177 near Pasadena; MD 648 in Glen Burnie; MD 270 in Glen Burnie; MD 710 in Glen Burnie
- North end: I-695 near Glen Burnie

Location
- Country: United States
- State: Maryland
- Counties: Anne Arundel

Highway system
- Maryland highway system; Interstate; US; State; Scenic Byways
← MD 8	→ US 11

Maryland Route 10 (MD 10) is a state highway in the U.S. state of Maryland. Known as the Arundel Expressway, the highway runs 7.17 miles (11.54 km) from MD 2 in Pasadena north to Interstate 695 (I-695) near Glen Burnie. MD 10 is a four- to six-lane freeway that serves as a bypass of MD 2 through Pasadena and Glen Burnie in northeastern Anne Arundel County. The Arundel Expressway was planned as a Baltimore–Annapolis freeway to provide relief to MD 2 between the cities as early as the 1950s. However, the portion of MD 10 south of Pasadena was removed from state plans when the I-97 corridor was chosen for the intercity freeway in the 1970s. MD 10 was constructed from I-695 to MD 710 in the early 1970s and continued south to MD 648 in the late 1970s. The freeway was extended south to MD 100 and completed to MD 2 in the late 1980s and early 1990s, respectively.

== Route description ==
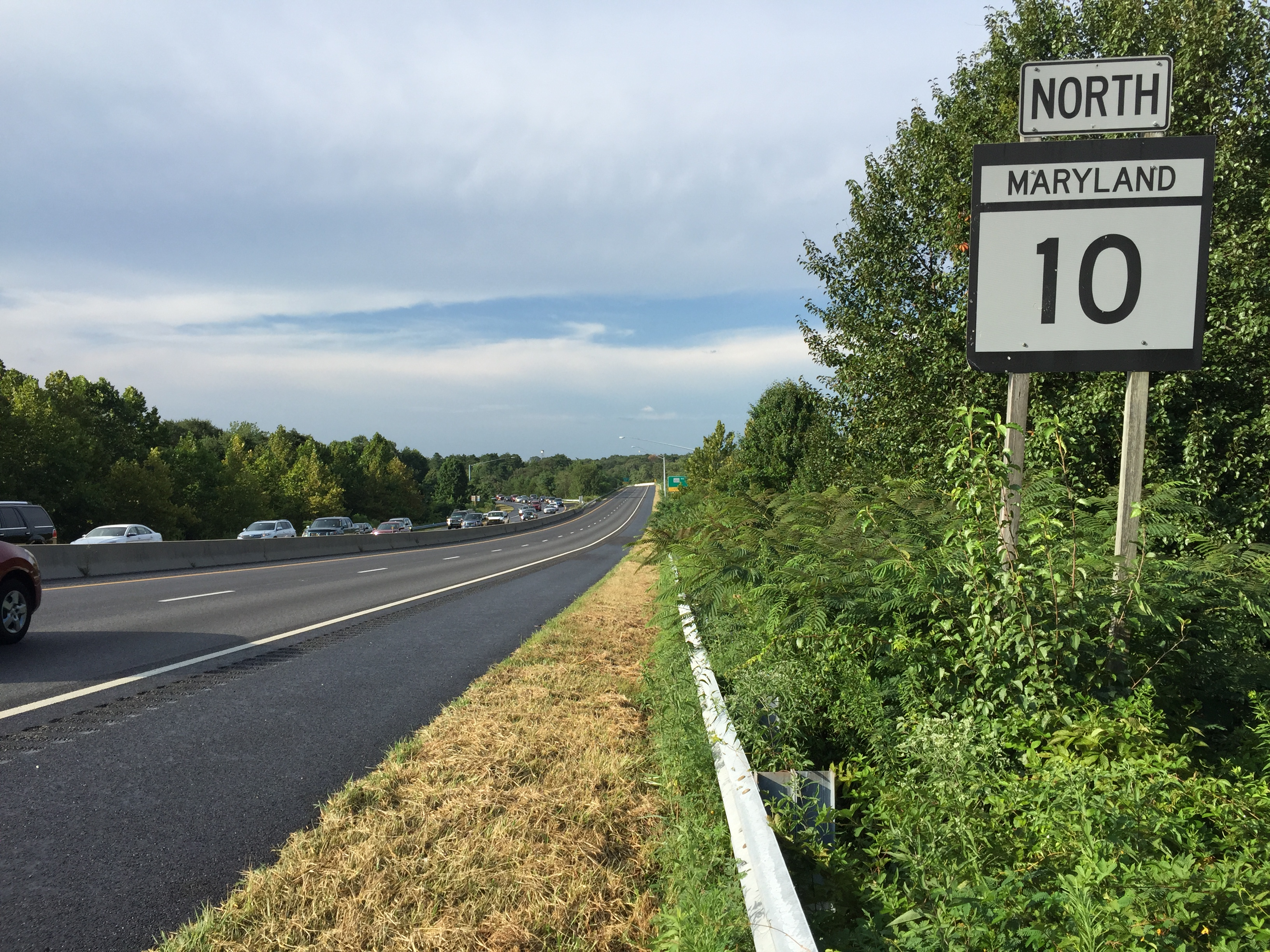
View north at the south end of MD 10 at MD 2 in Pasadena

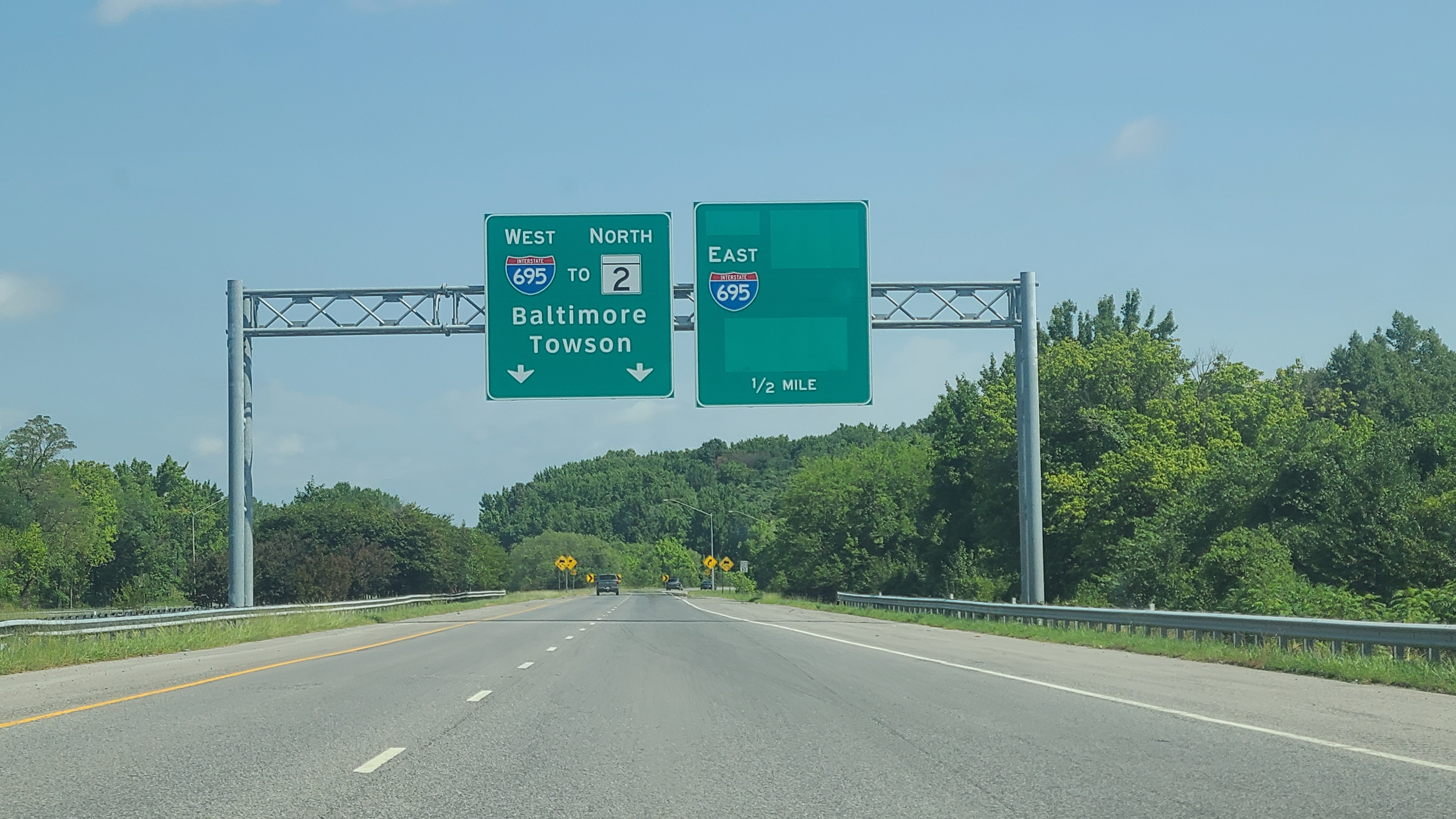
North end of MD 10 at I-695. The eastbound sign was patched over in response to the 2024 Key Bridge collapse.

MD 10 begins at an intersection with MD 2 (Governor Ritchie Highway) in Pasadena. The highway heads north as a four-lane freeway to a partial interchange with MD 100 (Paul T. Pitcher Memorial Highway). There is no access from northbound MD 10 to eastbound MD 100 or from westbound MD 100 to southbound MD 10. MD 10 and MD 100 briefly run concurrently northwest as an eight-lane freeway and diverge at another partial interchange; in both carriageways, traffic must move over two lanes to remain on the same route. Just north of the MD 100 split, MD 10 has a half-diamond interchange with MD 177 (Mountain Road). That interchange has ramps from southbound MD 10 to MD 177 and from MD 177 to northbound MD 10. Traffic from eastbound MD 100 to northbound MD 10 and from southbound MD 10 to westbound MD 100 uses MD 177 and MD 2 as intermediaries.

MD 10 continues north from MD 177 through the east side of Glen Burnie as a six-lane freeway. The highway crosses over Marley Creek and has a partial cloverleaf interchange with MD 648 (Baltimore–Annapolis Boulevard). MD 10 parallels MD 270 (Furnace Branch Road) north then meets the latter highway at a partial cloverleaf interchange. The highway crosses Furnace Branch and has a partial cloverleaf interchange with MD 710 (Ordnance Road), where northbound MD 10 becomes two lanes wide. MD 10 reaches its northern terminus at a trumpet interchange with I-695 (Baltimore Beltway). The sweeping ramp from MD 10 to westbound I-695 merges into a collector-distributor lane that allows access from MD 10 to northbound MD 2 in Brooklyn Park.

MD 10 is a part of the main National Highway System for its entire length.

== History ==
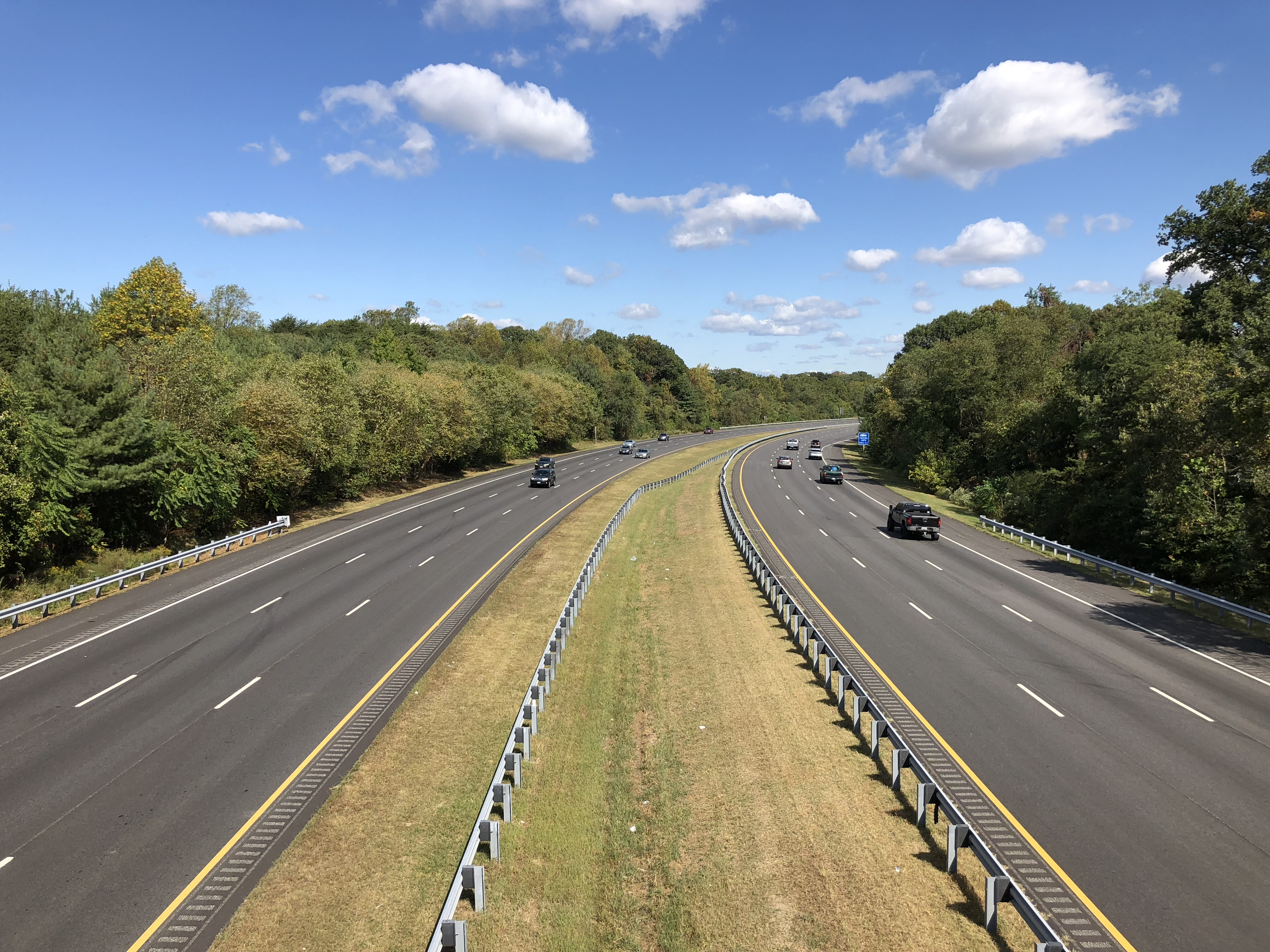
MD 10 northbound viewed from North Thompson Avenue in Glen Burnie

The Arundel Expressway was proposed as early as 1956 as a freeway connecting Baltimore and Annapolis to relieve congestion on MD 2. By 1966, the highway was planned to begin at MD 173 at the city limits of Baltimore, intersect a planned cross-Patapsco section of the Baltimore Beltway, follow its current path to Pasadena, then continue paralleling MD 2 south to near U.S. Route 50 (US 50) and US 301. The portion of the Arundel Expressway inside the Beltway was removed from plans in 1967, with the Beltway instead serving to connect the expressway with highways into Baltimore. The portion of the freeway south of Pasadena was planned to have intermediate interchanges at MD 648 in Severna Park and Jones Station Road (now College Parkway) in Arnold, and a toll plaza just south of the MD 100 interchange. The portion of the Arundel Expressway south of MD 100 was removed from state plans by 1975. Instead of a Baltimore–Annapolis freeway following the MD 2 corridor, in June 1979 the Maryland State Highway Administration announced it was constructing the freeway along the MD 3 and MD 178 corridors.

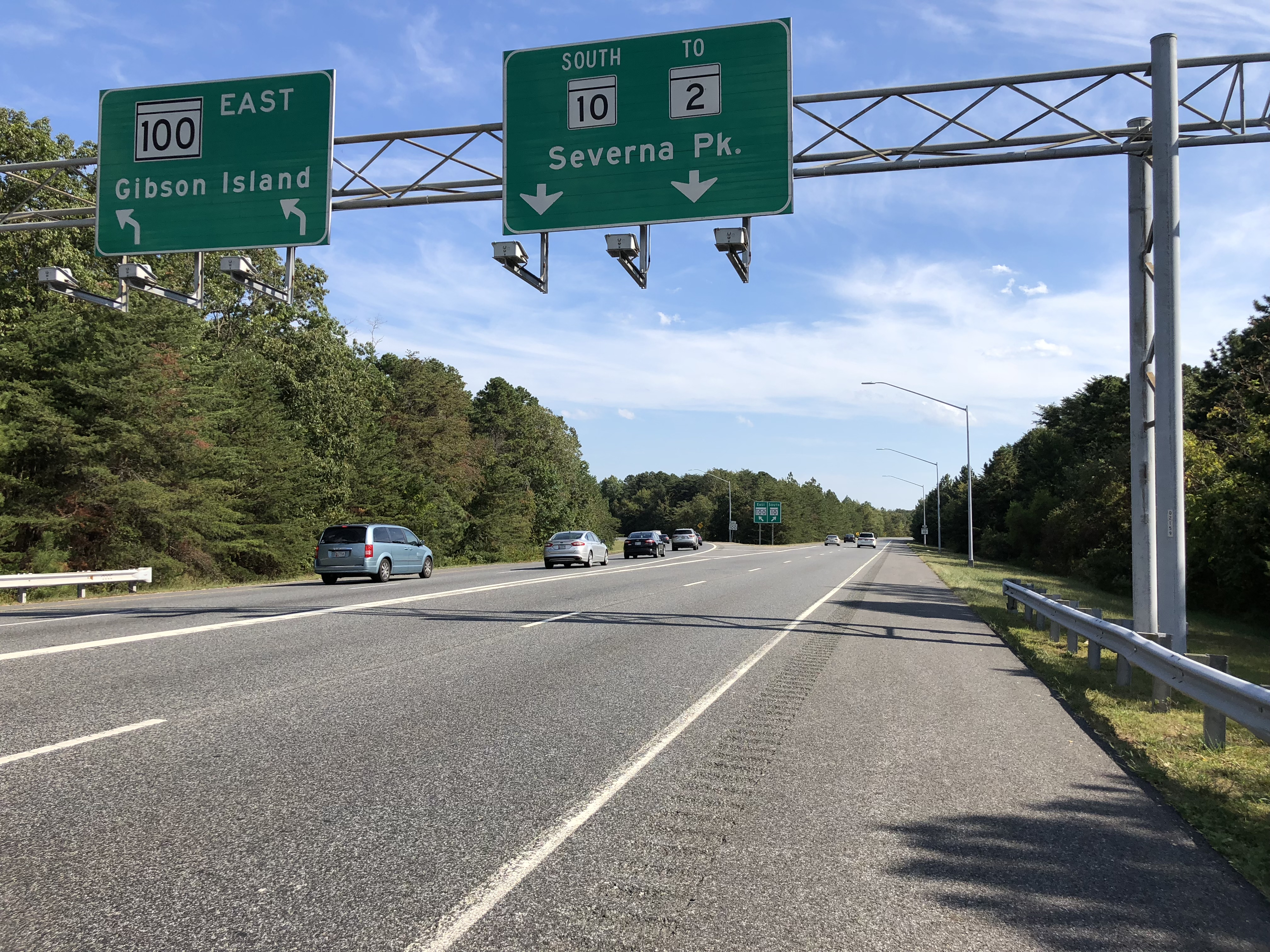
MD 10 southbound at split with MD 100 in Pasadena

The first section of modern MD 10 to open was the portion of freeway shared with MD 100, which opened in November 1970 from MD 2 to its eastern terminus. Work began on the Arundel Expressway proper in 1970 when the interchange between the expressway and the Baltimore Beltway was started in 1970. MD 710 was relocated over much of its length to make way for the construction of the freeways in 1972. The Arundel Expressway opened from the Beltway to MD 710 in December 1972 and was marked as MD 10 by 1974. Construction on the extension south to MD 648 was underway by 1975. MD 10 opened south to MD 270 in October 1977 and to MD 648 in March 1978. The freeway was proposed to continue south to MD 100, but that freeway extension was removed from short-term plans by 1981.

Construction began in 1987 to extend MD 10, which was dubbed the "Road to Nowhere," from MD 648 to a more logical southern terminus. The freeway opened from MD 648 to MD 100 in October 1988. The final segment of MD 10, from MD 100 to MD 2, opened in March 1991. The Arundel Expressway was planned to carry 75,000 as a complete Baltimore–Annapolis freeway. However, as of 2013, only 51,621 vehicles used the highway daily on its most traveled portion between MD 270 and MD 710. MD 10 functions as a bypass of MD 2 north of Pasadena, but has not fulfilled its original purpose to relieve traffic congestion on MD 2 south to Annapolis. By the time of MD 10's completion in 1991, MD 2 was proposed to be expanded to six lanes south of MD 10. As of 2016, MD 2 has yet to be widened south of Pasadena.

== Exit list ==
All exits are unnumbered. The entire route is in Anne Arundel County.

Location	mi	km	Destinations	Notes
Pasadena	0.00	0.00	MD 2 (Governor Ritchie Highway) – Severna Park, Annapolis	Southern terminus; at-grade intersection
Pasadena	0.81	1.30	MD 100 east (Paul T. Pitcher Memorial Highway) – Gibson Island	Southbound exit, northbound entrance; south end of concurrency with MD 100
Pasadena	1.29	2.08	MD 100 west (Paul T. Pitcher Memorial Highway) to I-97 / MD 177 / MD 2 – Ellicott City	Northbound exit, southbound entrance; north end of concurrency with MD 100
Pasadena	1.71	2.75	MD 177 (Mountain Road)	Southbound exit, northbound entrance
Glen Burnie	3.60	5.79	MD 648 (Baltimore–Annapolis Boulevard) – Sun Valley, Glen Burnie	
Glen Burnie	5.03	8.10	MD 270 (Furnace Branch Road)	
Glen Burnie	6.20	9.98	MD 710 (Ordnance Road) – Glen Burnie	
Glen Burnie	7.17	11.54	I-695 (Baltimore Beltway) to MD 2 north – Dundalk, Essex, Baltimore, Towson	Northern terminus; I-695 Exit 2
1.000 mi = 1.609 km; 1.000 km = 0.621 mi: Concurrency terminus; Incomplete access
