= Maryland Route 710 =

State highway in Maryland, United States

Maryland Route 710
- Ordnance Road

Route information
- Maintained by MDSHA
- Length: 2.16 mi (3.48 km)
- Existed: 1942–present

Major junctions
- West end: MD 2 in Glen Burnie
- MD 10 in Glen Burnie
- East end: MD 173 in Brooklyn Park

Location
- Country: United States
- State: Maryland
- Counties: Anne Arundel

Highway system
- Maryland highway system; Interstate; US; State; Scenic Byways
← MD 707	→ MD 711

Maryland Route 710 (MD 710) is a state highway in the U.S. state of Maryland, located in Anne Arundel County. Known as Ordnance Road, the state highway runs 2.16 miles (3.48 km) from MD 2 in Glen Burnie east to MD 173 in Brooklyn Park at the city limits of Baltimore. MD 710 provides access to the Defense Logistics Agency Curtis Bay Depot, a unit of the General Services Administration. The state highway is named for the federal site's prior use as a U.S. Army Depot. MD 710 was constructed in the early 1940s and relocated for most of its length concurrent with the construction of MD 10 in the early 1970s.

== Route description ==
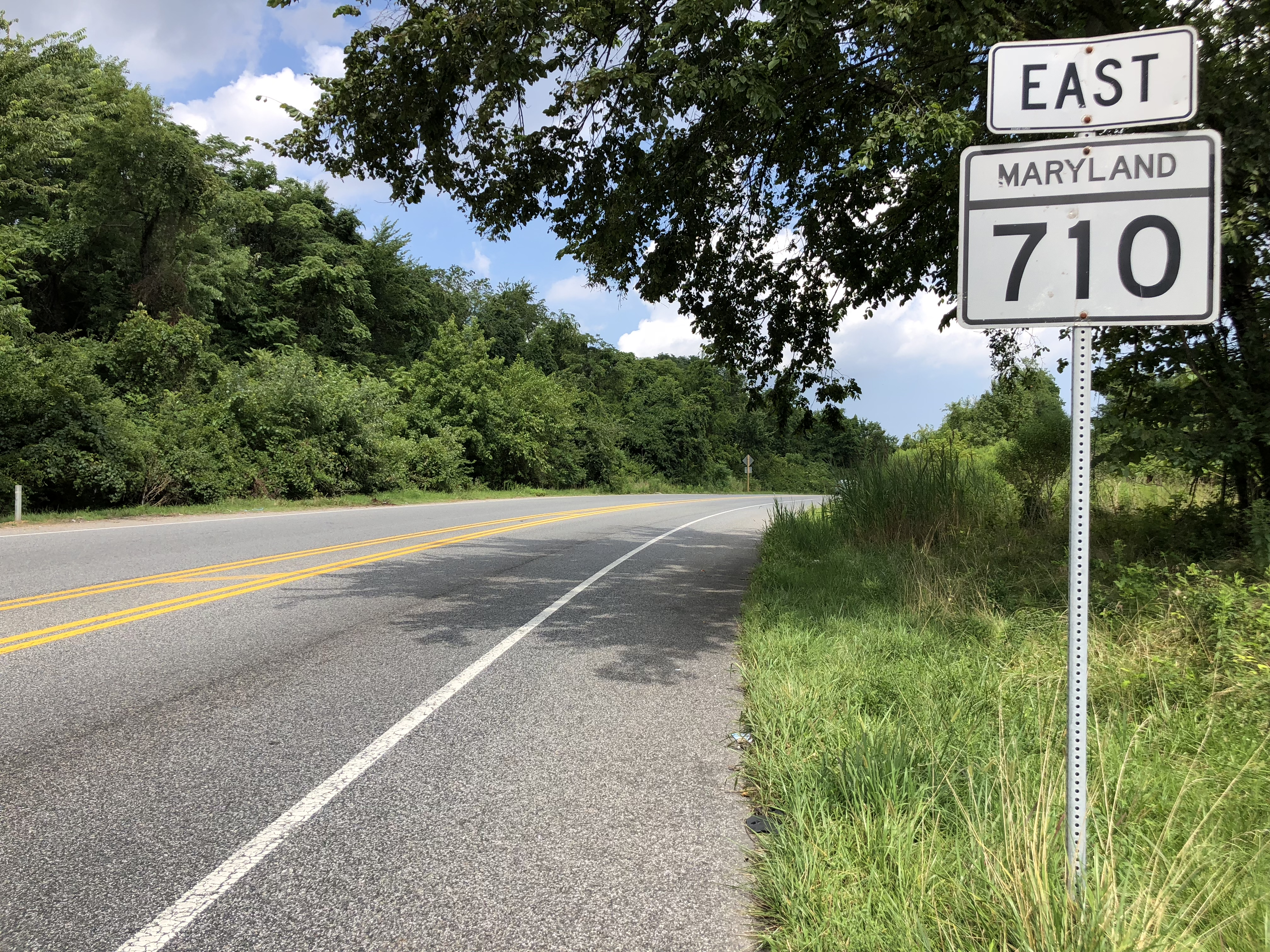
View east along MD 710 east of MD 10 in Glen Burnie

MD 710 begins at an intersection with MD 2 (Governor Ritchie Highway) surrounded by four shopping centers in Glen Burnie. The roadway continues west as county-maintained West Ordnance Road. MD 710 heads east as a four-lane divided highway and meets MD 10 (Arundel Expressway) at a partial cloverleaf interchange. Beyond MD 10, the state highway curves to the northeast, crosses a branch of Furnace Creek, and reduces to a two-lane undivided road. MD 710 passes the Anne Arundel County Correctional Center, a U.S. Army Reserve Center, and the Defense Logistics Agency Curtis Bay Depot. The state highway curves east and has a grade crossing of CSX's Curtis Bay Branch underneath Interstate 695 (I-695, Baltimore Beltway). MD 710's eastern terminus is at an intersection with MD 173 (Pennington Avenue/Hawkins Point Road) in Brooklyn Park at the city limits of Baltimore.

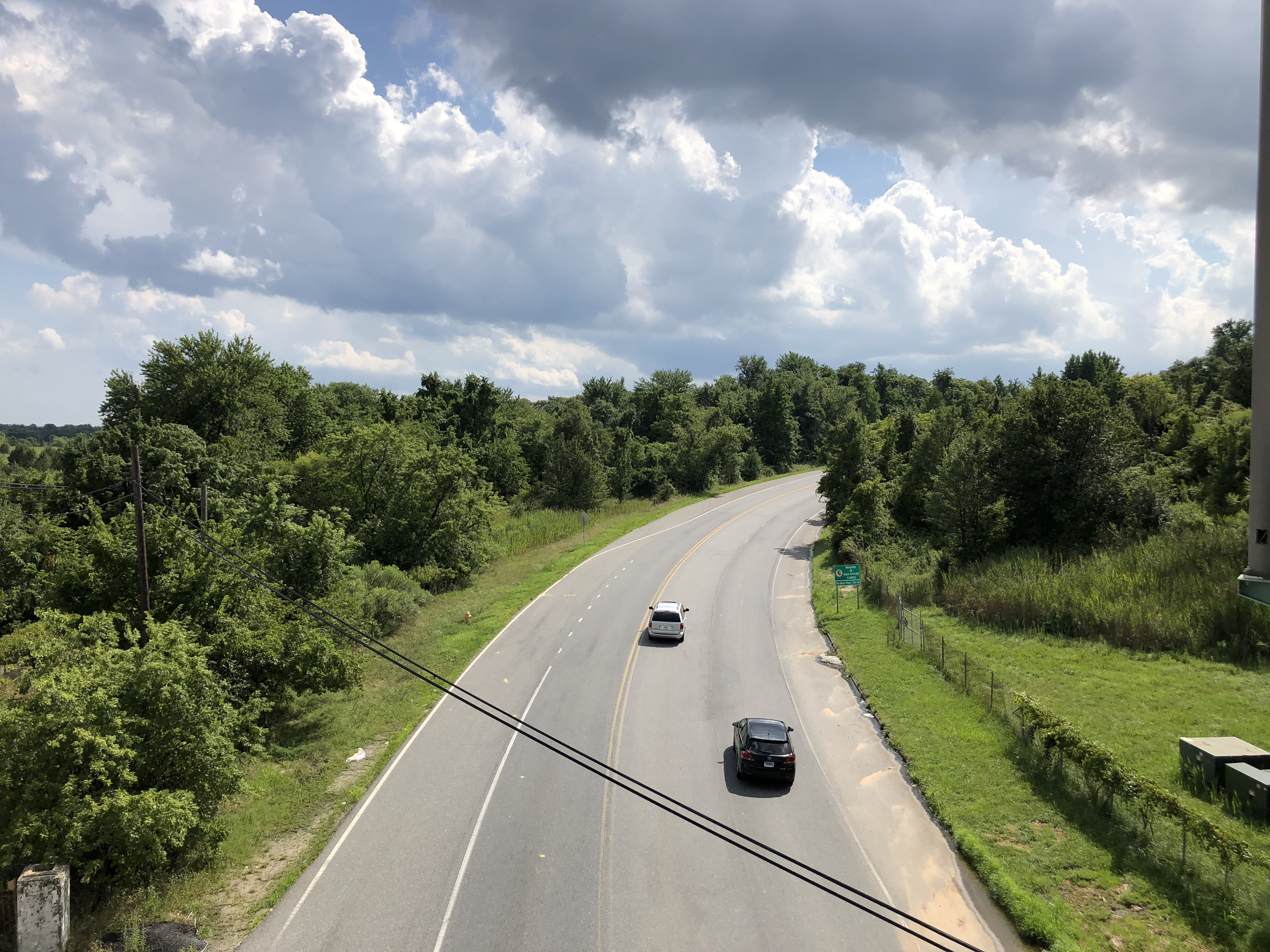
View east along MD 710 from I-695

== History ==
MD 710 was constructed as a 24-foot-wide (7.3 m) concrete road in 1942 to connect the Curtis Bay Ordnance Depot with MD 173 and MD 2. The highway originally followed what is now MD 711 east from MD 2. Beyond MD 711, the highway headed east through the site of MD 10's interchange with I-695 to what is now the U.S. Army Reserve Center, then followed its present alignment to MD 173. MD 710 was relocated to its present course, including the divided highway segment, in 1972 in conjunction with the construction of MD 10.

== Junction list ==
The entire route is in Anne Arundel County.

Location	mi	km	Destinations	Notes
Glen Burnie	0.00	0.00	MD 2 (Governor Ritchie Highway) to I-895 north / Ordnance Road west – Pasadena, Brooklyn Park, Ferndale	Western terminus
Glen Burnie	0.56	0.90	MD 10 (Arundel Expressway) to I-695 – Annapolis, Baltimore	Partial cloverleaf interchange
Brooklyn Park	2.16	3.48	MD 173 (Pennington Avenue/Hawkins Point Road) – Baltimore, Riviera Beach	Eastern terminus; Baltimore city limit
1.000 mi = 1.609 km; 1.000 km = 0.621 mi
