= Curtis Bay =

Curtis Bay may refer to some places in Maryland in the United States:

- Curtis Bay, Maryland (body of water), a cove by Curtis Creek in Baltimore
- Curtis Bay, Baltimore, a neighborhood in Baltimore
- Curtis Bay Depot, a Defense National Stockpile Center in Curtis Bay
- Curtis Bay Coast Guard Yard
- Route 64 (MTA Maryland) or "Curtis Bay Line", a Maryland Transit Administration bus route
