= Maryland Route 178 =

State highway in Anne Arundel County, Maryland, U.S. known as Generals Highway

Maryland Route 178
- Generals Highway
- Maryland Route 178 highlighted in red

Route information
- Maintained by MDSHA
- Length: 8.06 mi (12.97 km)
- Existed: 1927–present

Major junctions
- South end: MD 450 in Parole
- I-97 near Crownsville
- North end: Veterans Highway near Millersville

Location
- Country: United States
- State: Maryland
- Counties: Anne Arundel

Highway system
- Maryland highway system; Interstate; US; State; Scenic Byways
| ← MD 177 | → MD 179 |

Maryland Route 178 (MD 178) is a state highway in the U.S. state of Maryland. Known as Generals Highway, the highway runs 8.06 miles (12.97 km) from MD 450 in Parole north to Veterans Highway near Millersville. MD 178 connects Annapolis with Crownsville in central Anne Arundel County. The highway is indirectly named for George Washington, who traveled the highway in 1783 on his way to Annapolis to resign his commission in the Continental Army at the conclusion of the American Revolutionary War. MD 178 was planned as early as 1910 as part of a western route between Baltimore and Annapolis. However, most of the highway south of MD 3 was not built until the early 1930s. The portion south of MD 3 served as a primary segment in the western corridor connecting Baltimore–Annapolis, until the construction of Interstate 97 (I-97) in the late 1980s.

== Route description ==
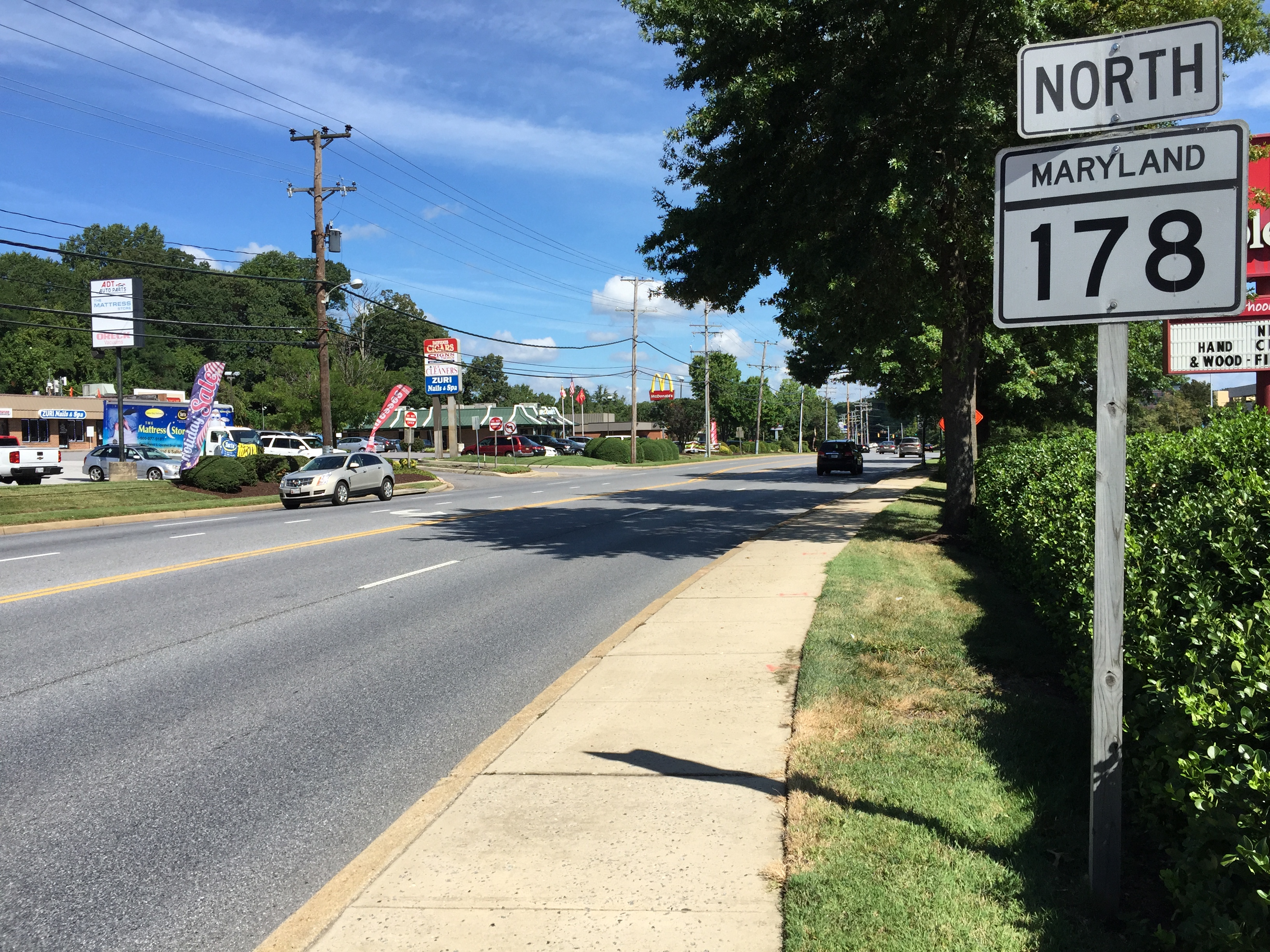
View north at the south end of MD 178 at MD 450 in Parole

MD 178 begins at a four-way intersection featuring MD 450 in Parole. MD 450 heads west as Defense Highway and southeast as West Street toward an interchange with U.S. Route 50 (US 50)/US 301 (John Hanson Highway) and Annapolis; the east leg of the intersection is an entrance to the Westfield Annapolis shopping mall. MD 178 heads north as a four-lane road with a center left-turn lane. North of Bestgate Road, the highway leaves the commercial area, curves to the northwest, and reduces to two lanes. MD 178 passes the historic home Iglehart in the eponymous hamlet, where the highway passes Old Generals Highway. A portion of the loop of old alignment is MD 798. MD 178 continues northwest and passes the historic home Belvoir before heading northeast of the Anne Arundel County Fairgrounds and entering the center of Crownsville. In the village, the highway passes St. Paul's Chapel at the corner of Crownsville Road, which leads south to the grounds of the seasonal Maryland Renaissance Festival.

At the north end of Crownsville, MD 178 intersects Herald Harbor Road, which leads to the community of Herald Harbor on the Severn River. The state highway meets the eastern end of interchange ramps from I-97; the ramps allow access from southbound I-97 to MD 178 and from MD 178 to northbound I-97, MD 32, and MD 3. MD 178 continues northwest past the Rising Sun Inn and Sunrise Beach Road, which leads to another riverside community, Arden-on-the-Severn. At the Cross Roads Church, the highway intersects Millersville Road, which provides access to the historic home Bunker Hill and the village of Millersville on the west side of I-97. MD 178 curves north and reaches its northern terminus at Veterans Highway, a county highway that parallels I-97 between Millersville and Glen Burnie.

== History ==
Generals Highway follows the path of an Annapolis–Philadelphia post road established by 1733. The highway is so named because it was traveled by George Washington on his journey from New York to Annapolis, then acting as the capital of the United States, to resign his commission as Commander-in-Chief of the Continental Army in December 1783. George Washington was greeted and escorted the remaining distance to Annapolis by a group of prominent citizens from the Three Mile Oak, a prominent tree located 3 miles (4.8 km) from the Maryland State House. The Three Mile Oak was located at what is today the southern terminus of MD 178. When the Maryland State Roads Commission designated a system of roads to improve in 1909, much of the Generals Highway was included as part of a second highway between Baltimore and Annapolis, after the Baltimore–Annapolis Boulevard that later became MD 2. The proposed highway headed south along Generals Highway from Glen Burnie to Crownsville, along what are now MD 3 Business, I-97, and MD 178, then south on Crownsville Road to the proposed highway that later became US 50 (now MD 450). The proposed highway south and east of Dorrs Corner, the site of MD 178's northern terminus, was not shifted from Crownsville Road to Generals Highway until 1930, by which time only short portions of the highway had been paved.

The first portion of MD 178 to be constructed was a small segment of concrete road south from the southern end of Old Generals Highway at Iglehart by 1923. This section was connected to US 50 by another section of concrete road in 1928. The portion of MD 178 from Dorrs Corner to Crownsville was placed under construction in 1930. The state highway was complete as a concrete road from MD 3 to Sherwood Forest Road just north of Iglehart (on what is now MD 798) in 1933. MD 178 was marked as such in 1935, despite a gap in the state highway remaining at Iglehart. Within a year of the highway's completion, the Maryland State Roads Commission recommended the highway be widened from 15 to 16 feet (4.6 to 4.9 m) to 20 feet (6.1 m) along its entire length. The state highway was widened from Dorrs Corner to Sherwood Forest Road in 1940. The gap in the state highway at Iglehart remained until the old road was bypassed in 1956, leaving behind MD 798. MD 178's interchange ramps with I-97 opened as the easternmost portion of MD 32 in 1972, bypassing the portion of the highway from Dorrs Corner to Crownsville. The rest of the route from Crownsville to Parole remained part of the primary highway on the western Baltimore–Annapolis highway until I-97 opened from US 50 and US 301 to Dorrs Corner in April 1989.

== Junction list ==
The entire route is in Anne Arundel County.

| Location | mi | km | Destinations | Notes |
|---|---|---|---|---|
| Parole | 0.00 | 0.00 | MD 450 (Defense Highway/West Street) to US 50 / US 301 – Annapolis, Crofton | Southern terminus |
| Crownsville | 5.35 | 8.61 | I-97 north to MD 3 south / MD 32 west – Odenton, Fort Meade, Baltimore | I-97 Exit 5; southbound exit from and northbound entrance to I-97 |
| Millersville | 8.06 | 12.97 | Veterans Highway to MD 3 south / MD 32 west | Northern terminus |
1.000 mi = 1.609 km; 1.000 km = 0.621 mi: Incomplete access

== Auxiliary route ==
MD 178A is the designation for a 0.28-mile (0.45 km) old section of Generals Highway next to the state highway's northern terminus near Millersville. The highway forms a curve east of the junction of MD 178 and Veterans Highway that intersects both highways on a tangent. MD 178A is two lanes and lined with houses except for a pair of one-way northbound segments on both ends. MD 178A follows what was originally the northernmost portion of MD 178 to meet what is now Veterans Highway at an acute intersection at Dorrs Corner. MD 178 was relocated to its present perpendicular intersection with Veterans Highway by 1978.
