= Interstate 97 =

Short Interstate Highway in Maryland

Interstate 97
- I-97 highlighted in red

Route information
- Maintained by MDSHA
- Length: 17.62 mi (28.36 km)
- Existed: 1987–present
- NHS: Entire route

Major junctions
- South end: US 50 / US 301 in Parole
- MD 178 in Crownsville; MD 3 / MD 32 in Millersville; MD 174 in Glen Burnie; MD 100 in Glen Burnie; MD 162 / MD 176 in Glen Burnie; MD 648 in Ferndale; I-695 in Ferndale
- North end: I-895A in Brooklyn Park

Location
- Country: United States
- State: Maryland
- Counties: Anne Arundel

Highway system
- Interstate Highway System; Main; Auxiliary; Suffixed; Business; Future; Maryland highway system; Interstate; US; State; Scenic Byways
← I-95	→ MD 97

Interstate 97 (I-97) is a north-south Interstate Highway in the eastern United States. It runs entirely within Anne Arundel County, Maryland, for 17.62 miles (28.36 km) from U.S. Route 50/U.S. Route 301 (US 50/US 301) in Parole near Annapolis north to I-695 and I-895B in Brooklyn Park near Baltimore. The Interstate is the primary highway between Baltimore and Annapolis. I‑97 connects Annapolis with Baltimore/Washington International Airport and links the northern Anne Arundel County communities of Crownsville, Millersville, Severna Park, Glen Burnie, and Ferndale. It is currently the third shortest primary Interstate Highway in the country after the unfinished I-87 in North Carolina and the unfinished I-42 in Arkansas.

I-97 was constructed along the corridor of Maryland Route 3 (MD 3) between Millersville and Ferndale and MD 178 between Parole and Millersville. From Millersville to south of Glen Burnie, the Interstate closely follows the former course of MD 3, which was built in the late 1910s and early 1920s and expanded to a divided highway in the late 1950s. North of there, the highway follows the Glen Burnie Bypass, a freeway built in the mid-1950s. The segment of I-97 from Millersville to Crownsville originated as a two-lane portion of MD 32 in the early 1970s. The interstate was introduced in 1979 after the state of Maryland successfully obtained Interstate mileage for a Baltimore–Annapolis freeway from the federal government. The state decided to build the highway along I-97's current corridor rather than along the MD 2 corridor, which has partial freeway access via MD 10.

Construction on I-97 began in the late 1980s with new construction from US 50/US 301 to Crownsville. The Crownsville–Millersville segment of MD 32 was expanded and incorporated into the Interstate and the MD 3–MD 32 junction was upgraded. The portion of the MD 3 corridor from Millersville to south of Glen Burnie was upgraded on the spot to Interstate Highway standards in the early 1990s, after which MD 3 was truncated at Millersville. I-97's interchange with I-695 was rebuilt in the late 1980s and early 1990s. The Glen Burnie Bypass was upgraded and expanded to six lanes in the mid-1990s. The complex process included reconstruction of several interchanges; the last interchange to be reconstructed was upgraded in the mid-2000s.

== Route description ==
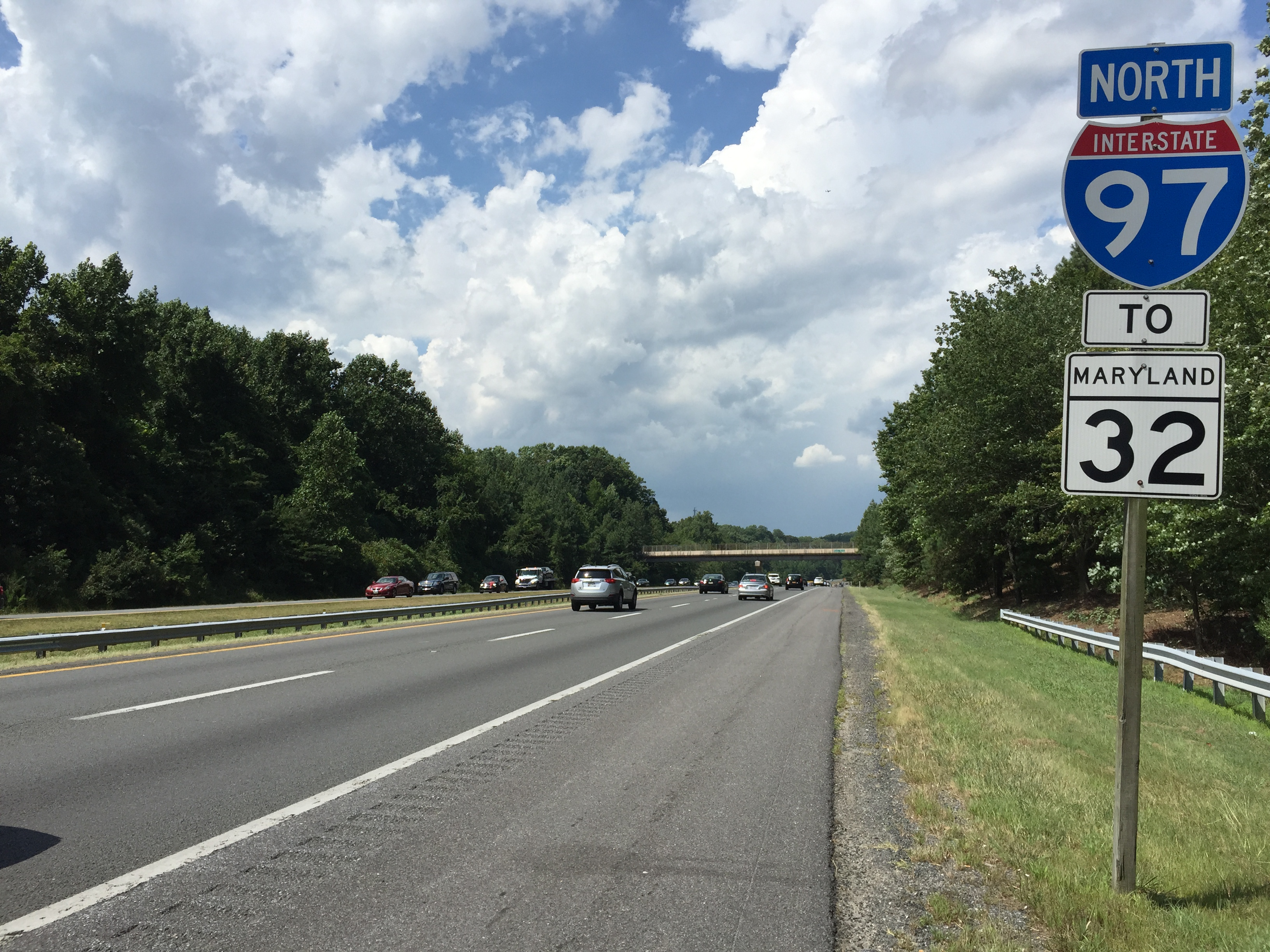
View north along I-97 in Crownsville between US 50/US 301 and MD 178

I-97 begins at US 50/US 301 (John Hanson Highway), which run concurrently with unsigned I-595, on the edge of the community of Parole west of Annapolis. The freeways meet at a semi-directional T interchange; the ramp from I-97 to eastbound US 50/northbound US 301 merges with a collector–distributor road that extends east to that freeway's interchange with MD 665 (Aris T. Allen Boulevard). I-97 heads northwest as a four-lane freeway. The freeway crosses over MD 450 (Defense Highway) and passes along the south and west sides of Crownsville, where it crosses several tributaries of the Bacon Ridge Branch of the South River. North of Crownsville, I-97 has a partial interchange that comprises a pair of long ramps to MD 178 (Generals Highway); the interchange allows access from southbound I-97 to MD 178 and from the state highway to the northbound Interstate. I-97 gains an extra lane in each direction from the MD 178 ramps; those extra lanes split off at the freeway's partial interchange with the eastern end of MD 32 just north of Millersville. The Interstate curves northeast and has a complementary partial interchange with the northern end of MD 3 (Robert Crain Highway). The two state highways meet each other at a six-ramp partial cloverleaf interchange immediately to the west of I-97's sweeping curve, which facilitates all movements between the three highways.

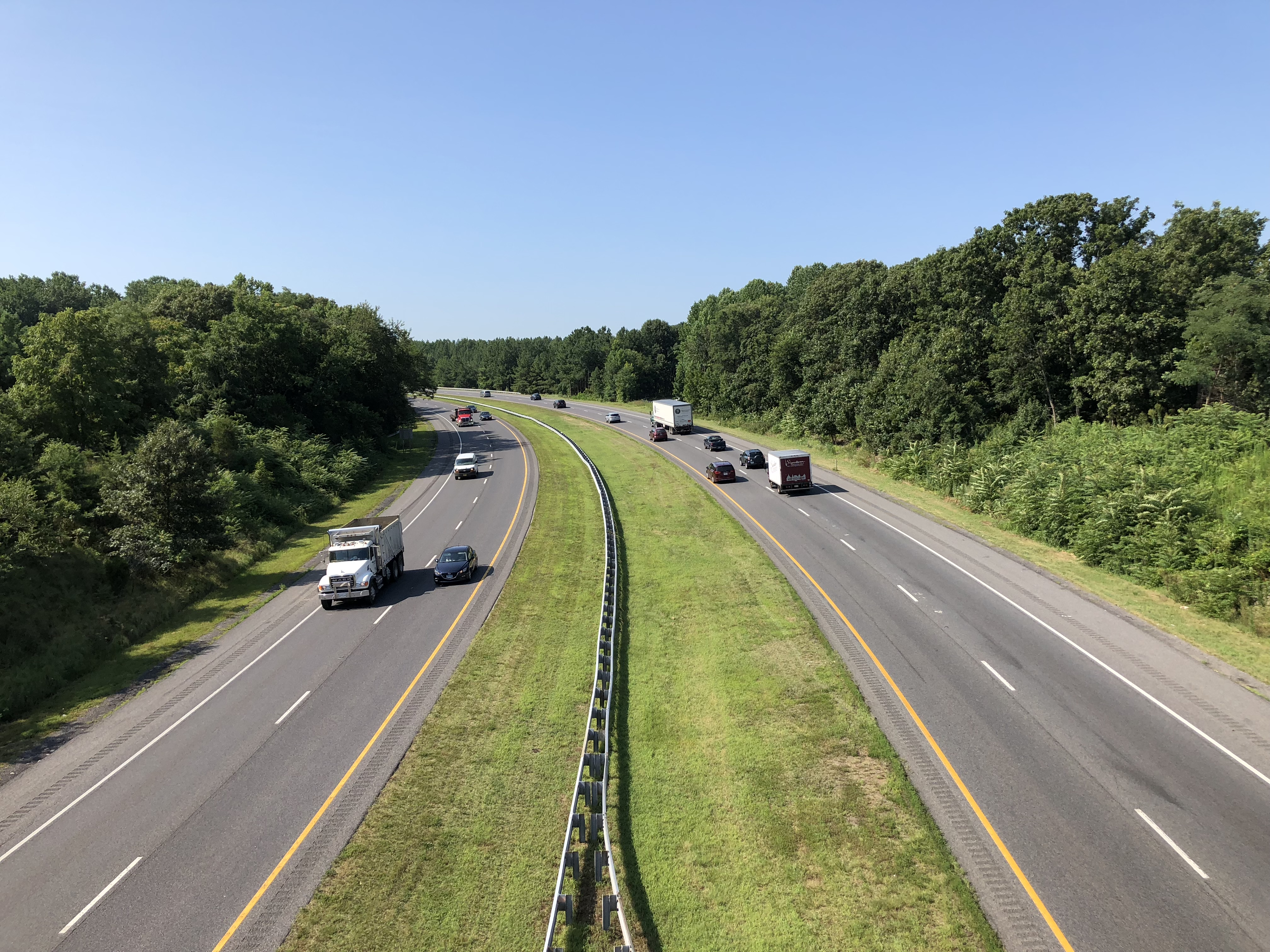
I-97 southbound past MD 3 in Millersville

I-97 continues north as a six-lane freeway and is closely paralleled on the east by Veterans Highway on the western edge of Severna Park. The highways cross the Severn River within Severn Run Natural Environment Area before they diverge slightly at the Interstate's partial cloverleaf interchange with Benfield Boulevard; access from northbound I-97 to the crossroad is via Veterans Highway. I-97 and Veterans Highway continue to parallel each other to the latter highway's northern end at I-97's partial cloverleaf interchange with the southern end of MD 3 Business (MD 3 Bus.; Robert Crain Highway) and New Cut Road. The interchange includes a flyover ramp from northbound I-97 to northbound Veterans Highway just south of its intersection with MD 3 Bus. The freeway continues north along the west side of Glen Burnie and meets MD 174 (Quarterfield Road) at a four-ramp partial cloverleaf interchange and MD 100 at a combination interchange that has flyover exit ramps from both directions of I-97.

I-97 temporarily gains two extra lanes in each direction between MD 100 and its partial cloverleaf interchange with MD 176 (Dorsey Road). Access from the southbound Interstate to MD 176 is via MD 162 (Aviation Boulevard), which forms part of the Airport Loop surrounding Baltimore/Washington International Airport. I-97 continues through Ferndale, where it crosses over the Glen Burnie branch of the Maryland Transit Administration (MTA)'s Baltimore Light RailLink immediately before the highway's four-ramp partial cloverleaf interchange with MD 648 (Baltimore–Annapolis Boulevard), which provides access to the transit line's terminal station, Glen Burnie station. I-97's final interchange is with I-695 (Baltimore Beltway). The Interstate crosses the Cabin Branch of Curtis Creek within the interchange, which includes a flyover ramp from I-97 to westbound I-695; that ramp and the one from eastbound I-695 to I-97 merge on the inside of the two carriageways of the beltway. The Interstate drops to four lanes and reaches its northern terminus just north of the loop ramp from westbound I-695 to I-97 in Brooklyn Park. The highway continues north as I-895A, a pair of ramps that merge with I-895B, the spur from I-895 (Harbor Tunnel Thruway) to MD 2 (Governor Ritchie Highway). The continuation from I-97 includes a ramp to westbound I-695 that allows access to the beltway's interchange with MD 648.

I-97 does not have an official name. However, the Interstate is dedicated to John A. Cade, who served the area around Severna Park in the Maryland Senate from 1974 to his 1996 death and who worked to secure funding for the highway. The Maryland General Assembly passed a dedication bill in 1998, and the Maryland State Highway Administration (MDSHA) installed a pair of signs noting the dedication in Millersville and near Parole. Like all Interstate Highways, I-97 is a part of the National Highway System for its entire length. I-97 is the shortest completed two-digit mainline Interstate (I-87 in North Carolina and I-42 in Arkansas are shorter, but are still under construction) and officially the only intracounty two-digit Interstate in the contiguous US (I-11 is also currently intracounty, but intended to extend much further when finished.)

== History ==
=== Predecessor highways ===
The first modern highway along the path of what is now I-97 followed the corridor from New Cut Road to south of the intersection of MD 178 and Veterans Highway at Dorrs Corner. This highway was intended as a second route from Glen Burnie to Annapolis to complement the highway along the east side of the Severn River; this western route later became known as General's Highway, a name still applied to its MD 178 portion. Construction of this highway was underway by 1919. The new highway was completed as a gravel road from New Cut Road to north of Benfield and as a concrete road through Benfield and across Severn Run to near Dorrs Corner by 1921. In 1922, this highway was designated part of Robert Crain Highway, a new highway to connect the Baltimore area with Southern Maryland. The Glen Burnie–Dorrs Corner portion of the new highway was reconstructed and completed as a concrete road from Glen Burnie south through Millersville by 1923. Robert Crain Highway became part of MD 3 in 1927 and then US 301 in 1939 when the US Route was extended from Virginia to Baltimore. MD 3 was reconstructed in 1933 and 1934. The reconstruction eliminated several dangerous curves, particularly near the Severn River, and expanded the highway from a width of 15 to 20 feet (4.6 to 6.1 m). Veterans Highway follows much of that early 1930s course.

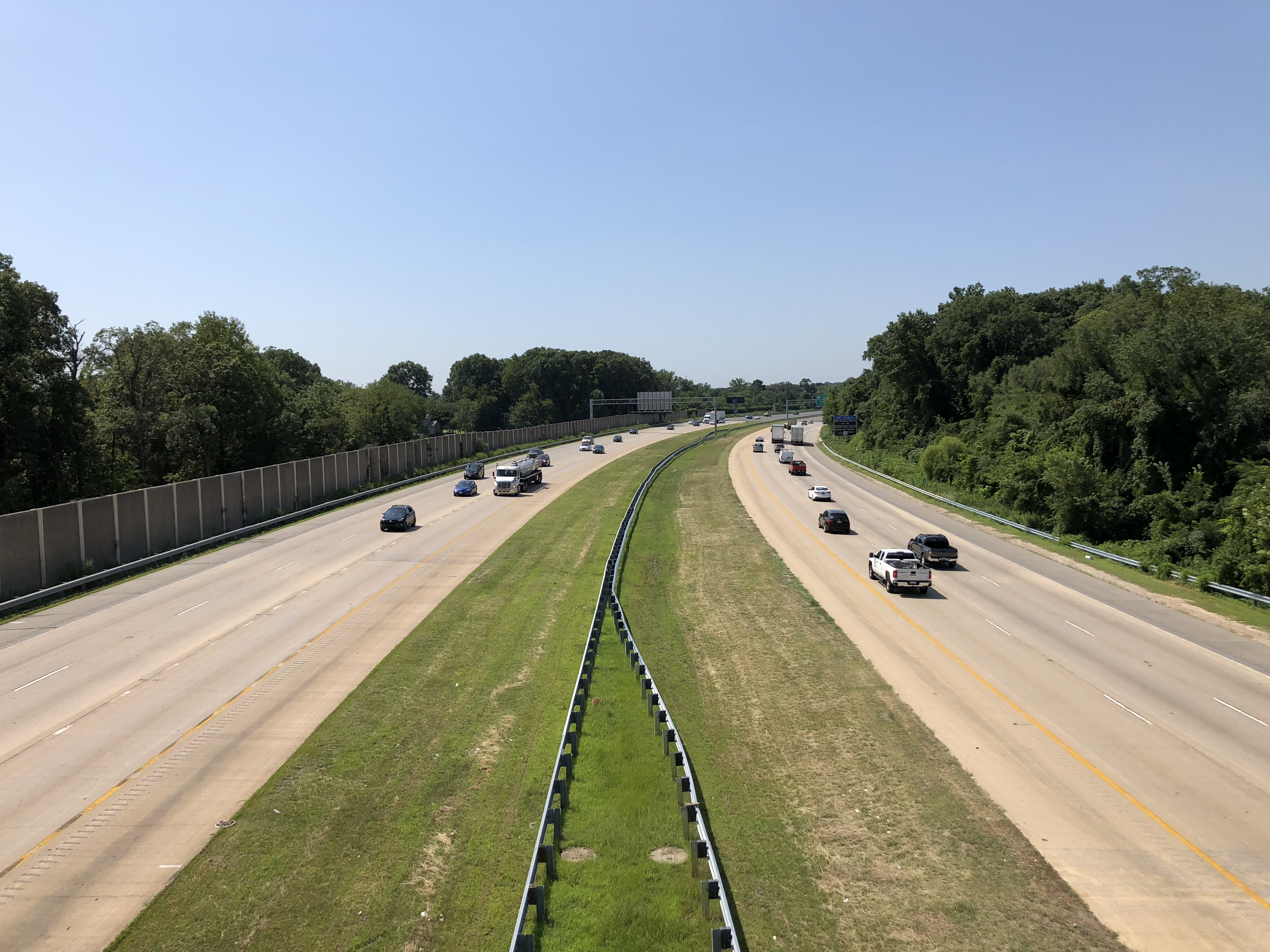
View south along I-97 from Wellham Avenue in Ferndale

The next portion of I-97 predecessor highway was built as the four-lane Glen Burnie Bypass from Robert Crain Highway and New Cut Road north to the Baltimore Beltway. Construction on the four-lane freeway began in August 1954 with construction of several bridges over or for the highway; these bridges were completed in 1955 and 1956. The dual roadways and interchange ramps from the southern end of the bypass to MD 648 were constructed starting in March 1955; the concrete-surfaced highway was completed in February 1957. The northernmost portion of the bypass, including the adjacent portion of the Baltimore Beltway, was constructed between December 1955 and September 1957. US 301 was moved onto the bypass and the adjacent portion of the Beltway when the projects were completed in 1957. The small portion of I-97 north of the Beltway was added to the Baltimore Harbor Tunnel project as a direct connection between the Glen Burnie Bypass and the Harbor Tunnel Thruway's southern approach from MD 2 in 1955. This segment was completed and opened with the tunnel and its approach highways in November 1957. The Glen Burnie Bypass was constructed with five interchanges: a partial cloverleaf interchange at MD 3 Bus. and New Cut Road; a tighter four-ramp partial cloverleaf interchange at MD 174; a diamond interchange at MD 176; the current four-ramp partial cloverleaf interchange at MD 648; and a half-cloverleaf interchange at I-695 allowing full access between the Glen Burnie Bypass and beltway but no access between the beltway and the Harbor Tunnel Thruway.

US 301 was expanded to a divided highway from the southern end of the Glen Burnie Bypass to Benfield in 1956 and 1957. The highway's second set of lanes, including a new bridge across the Severn River, was constructed and the existing roadway was reconstructed from Benfield to Millersville between 1957 and 1960. The second set of lanes was built on the west side of what became a very wide median, which allowed businesses to site themselves in the median between the northbound and southbound lanes. During construction of the Benfield–Millersville stretch, US 301 was relocated to its present course from Bowie to the Eastern Shore and replaced with MD 3. A pair of ramps between the Glen Burnie Bypass and MD 177's freeway southern bypass of Glen Burnie (now MD 100) were constructed between 1963 and 1965. The first section of highway south of Dorrs Corner was built between 1969 and 1972 as a two-lane segment of MD 32 from east of Odenton to MD 178 in Crownsville. The highway used what are now the ramps of I-97's partial interchange with MD 178 and had a five-ramp interchange with MD 3 in Millersville that lacked access from northbound MD 3 to eastbound MD 32 and from westbound MD 32 to southbound MD 3.

=== Interstate designation and construction ===
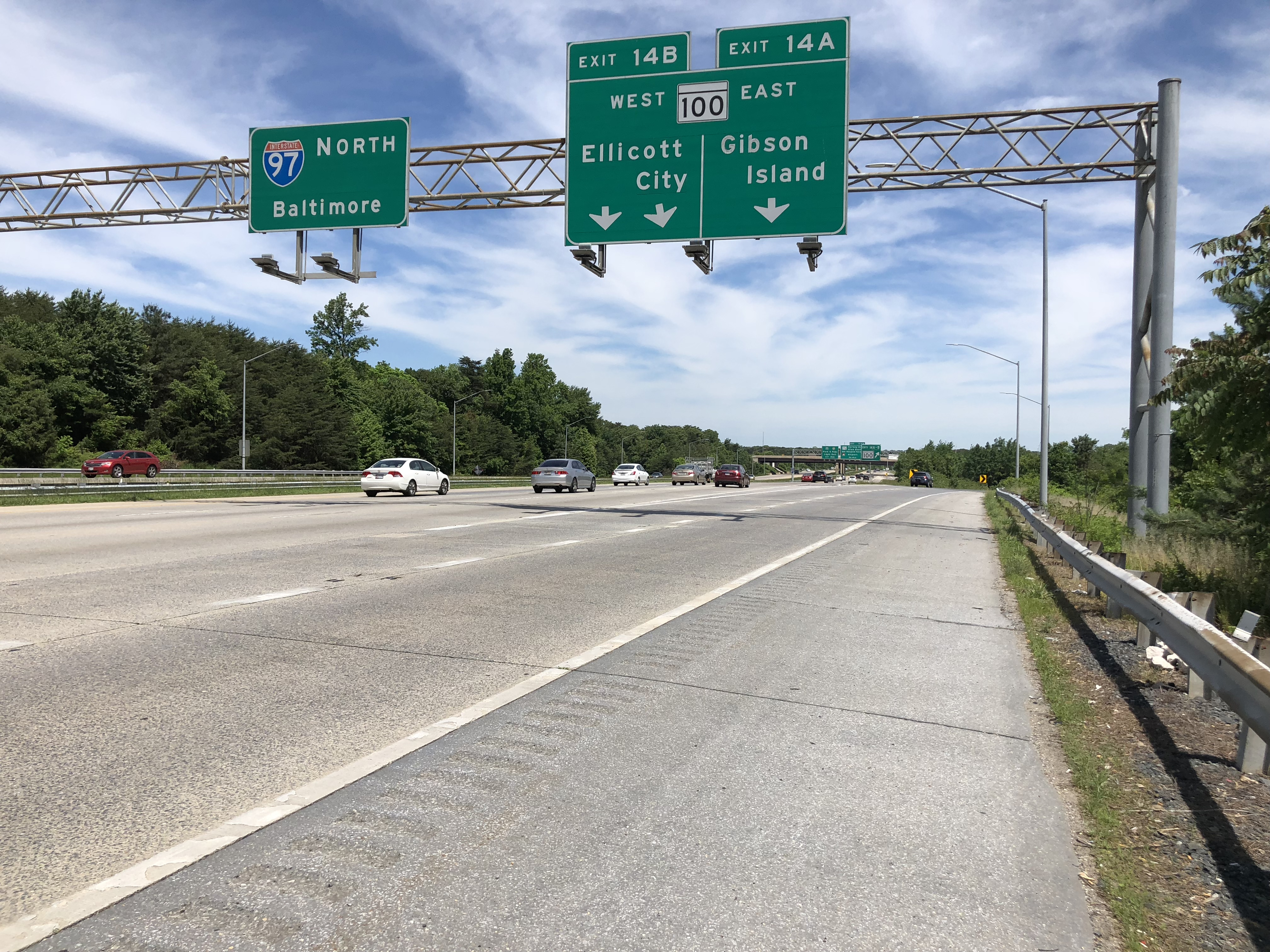
I-97 northbound at the MD 100 interchange in Glen Burnie

Despite the existence or upcoming construction of two divided highway corridors between Baltimore and Annapolis, a freeway connecting I-695 and US 50 was proposed as early as 1956 in the form of the Arundel Expressway, which would relieve congestion on MD 2. The portion of the Arundel Expressway that is today MD 10 was constructed from I-695 to MD 648 in Pasadena between 1970 and 1978. MD 10 was proposed to continue south of Pasadena as a toll road to US 50, but the section of the freeway south of MD 100 was removed from state plans by 1975. MD 10 was completed to its present end in Pasadena in 1991. The state of Maryland unsuccessfully petitioned the Federal Highway Administration for an Interstate designation for a Baltimore–Annapolis freeway after passage of the Federal-Aid Highway Act of 1968. However, the state was successful in obtaining Interstate mileage for the Baltimore–Annapolis corridor through the 1968 Howard–Cramer amendment, which provided for minor adjustments to the Interstate System if no additional costs were incurred. Much of the mileage of what became I-97 was reallocated from canceled Interstate Highways in Baltimore and the Washington, D.C. area.

With Interstate funding assured, MDSHA commissioned the Baltimore–Annapolis Transportation Corridor Study in 1973 to figure out, among other things, the best route for the Baltimore–Annapolis Interstate. The study discovered a western route following the MD 3 and MD 178 corridors would be less disruptive and require fewer acquisitions of homes and businesses compared to an extension of the Arundel Expressway south along the MD 2 corridor. In June 1979, MDSHA announced plans for I-97. The original route numbering plan, which was approved by the American Association of State Highway and Transportation Officials (AASHTO) at its November 1975 meeting, was for I-97 to include its current route plus US 50 from Parole west to I-95 (Capital Beltway). That proposal included two auxiliary Interstate highways. I-197 would follow US 50/US 301 east from I-97 to just west of the Severn River. I-297 would follow MD 3 between a pair of intersections with I-97 in Millersville and Bowie. AASHTO rescinded its approval of the 1975 plan at its June 1981 meeting, then approved what was essentially the original 1975 plan at its June 1982 meeting. The east–west segment of I-97 and I-197 was replaced by I-68. I-297 was withdrawn by request of the state of Maryland in 1983. The 1982 concept of I-68 became unsigned I-595 and I-68 was applied to the National Freeway in Western Maryland in 1991 after AASHTO approved the new designations at its June 1989 meeting.

The first portion of I-97 proper to be constructed was the section south of Millersville, which was placed under construction in three sections in March 1985. The first section of the highway, from US 50/US 301 to Millersville Road west of the MD 178 interchange, opened in December 1987. Construction of I-97 from Millersville Road to the intersection of MD 3 and MD 178 at Dorrs Corner started in July 1987. The Interstate through Millersville opened in April 1989. The interchange at I-97's southern terminus was originally constructed as a partial interchange, with I-97 tying into what are now the collector–distributor lanes of US 50 and US 301. The ramps from eastbound US 50/US 301 to I-97 and from I-97 to the westbound US Routes were added during the reconstruction of US 50/US 301 in 1992 and 1993.

=== Reconstruction of existing highway ===
Reconstruction of the MD 3 divided highway and the Glen Burnie Bypass was a complex operation that involved many temporary openings, lane shifts, construction of new roadways, and reconstruction of existing roadways over several phases over several years. The first improvement was the reconstruction of the I-695 interchange between 1987 and 1991. The modern ramps from I-97 to westbound I-695 and from eastbound I-695 to I-97 were built, eastbound I-695's ramp over these two ramps was constructed, and the loop ramp from I-97 to westbound I-695 was removed. I-97 from its interchange with MD 648 to the new beltway ramps was reconstructed to Interstate Highway standards and expanded to six lanes between May 1993 and August 1995. Part of the functionality of the loop ramp to westbound I-695 was restored in October 1995 when another ramp from the Harbor Tunnel Thruway approach to westbound I-695 was added to allow access from I-97 to MD 648.

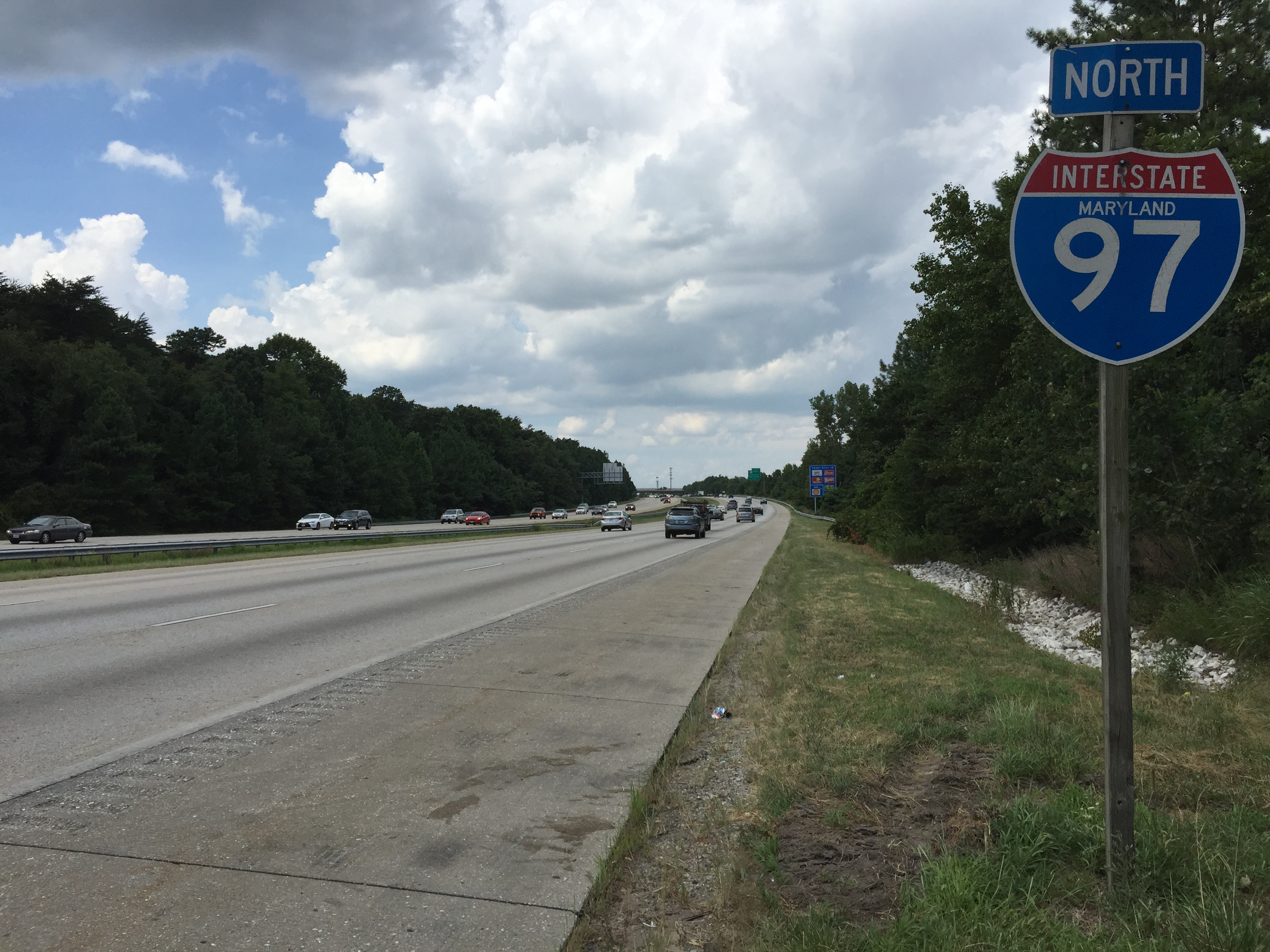
I-97 northbound in Severna Park

Reconstruction of the MD 3 divided highway from Millersville to MD 3 Bus. began in 1987 over two sections. The first section, from north of MD 3 Bus. to north of Benfield Boulevard, began in 1987. The work included the construction of the flyover ramp from northbound I-97 to Veterans Highway just south of MD 3 Bus. The section from north of Benfield Boulevard to MD 178 at Dorrs Corner was reconstructed starting in 1989. The second section included construction of the Benfield Boulevard interchange. The southbound MD 3 roadway was rebuilt in place as the southbound lanes of I-97. New northbound lanes were built immediately to the east of the southbound lanes. In February 1991, the new northbound lanes opened and access from I-97 to Veterans Highway was removed at Dorrs Corner. The old northbound lanes were reconstructed and repurposed as a two-lane road, Veterans Highway, later that year. Anne Arundel County agreed to accept Veterans Highway for maintenance after the I-97–related construction concluded in a road transfer agreement on July 21, 1988. MD 3 was truncated at Millersville after I-97 opened in October 1991; signage for MD 3 on I-695 was removed by 1993.

Before reconstruction of the Glen Burnie Bypass from MD 3 Bus. to MD 648 began in November 1993, the Stewart Avenue bridge across the Interstate just south of the MD 100 interchange was replaced and ramps from northbound I-97 to eastbound MD 100 and from westbound MD 100 to southbound I-97 were added between 1990 and 1992. The freeway was reconstructed to Interstate standards in three sections. The middle section from MD 174 to MD 176 was reconstructed concurrently with the segment of MD 100 west from I-97 to MD 295 starting in 1993. That segment of MD 100, including the MD 100–I-97 interchange, opened in November 1996, and the reconstruction of the middle section of I-97 was finished in July 1997. The sections of I-97 from MD 3 Bus. to MD 174 and from MD 176 to MD 648 and were reconstructed starting in January 1994. The MD 176–MD 648 roadway sectional was completed in March 1996. The northern half of the MD 176 interchange was reconstructed as part of the latter project. The new loop ramp from northbound I-97 to westbound MD 176 and the new ramp from MD 176 to northbound I-97 were completed in 1995. The ramp from southbound I-97 to MD 176 was removed during the widening project. The pair of ramps between southbound I-97 and MD 162 to replace the removed ramp were constructed between 1996 and 1998. The final piece of construction on I-97 was the reconstruction of its interchange with MD 174, which began in 2002 and concluded in 2005.

== Future ==
MDOT plans to widen I-97 to a six-lane freeway between the US 50 and MD 32 interchanges, add an auxiliary lane on northbound and southbound I-97 between the MD 32 and MD 178 interchanges in Millersville, and widen northbound I-97 to four lanes from US 50 to some point north of MD 450. The collector-distributor on westbound US 50 between the I-97 and MD 665 interchanges is to be widened to four lanes. Such widening will include the reconstruction and widening of the bridges over MD 450 and Crownsville Road. The project is expected to start construction around 2027.

== Exit list ==
The entire route is in Anne Arundel County.

Location	mi	km	Exit	Destinations	Notes
Parole	0.00	0.00	—	US 50 / US 301 – Annapolis, Bay Bridge, Richmond, Washington	Exit 21 on US 50/US 301 (unsigned I-595)
Crownsville	5.19	8.35	5	MD 178 – Crownsville, Fairgrounds	Southbound exit and northbound entrance
Millersville	6.71– 7.82	10.80– 12.59	7	MD 32 west / MD 3 south – Bowie, Odenton	Eastern terminus of MD 32; northern terminus of MD 3
Severna Park	9.67	15.56	10	Benfield Boulevard / Veterans Highway – Severna Park	Signed as exits 10A (east) and 10B (west) southbound; Benfield Boulevard is unsigned MD 3C
Glen Burnie	12.10	19.47	12	MD 3 Bus. north / New Cut Road – Glen Burnie	Southern terminus of MD 3 Bus.
Glen Burnie	13.29	21.39	13	MD 174 (Quarterfield Road)	
Glen Burnie	13.84	22.27	14	MD 100 – Gibson Island, Ellicott City	Signed as exits 14A (east) and 14B (west); exit 13 on MD 100
Glen Burnie	14.80	23.82	15	MD 176 (Dorsey Road) – Glen Burnie, BWI Thurgood Marshall Airport, Light Rail	No southbound exit; signed as exits 15A (east) and 15B (west); exit 15B also serves BWI Rail Station
Glen Burnie	15.07	24.25	15	MD 162 (Aviation Boulevard) – BWI Thurgood Marshall Airport	Southbound exit and entrance; via unsigned MD 162A; also serves BWI Rail Station
Ferndale	15.58	25.07	16	MD 648 (Baltimore–Annapolis Boulevard) – Ferndale, Glen Burnie	
Ferndale	17.46	28.10	17	I-695 – Baltimore, Towson	Signed as exits 17A (west) and 17B (east) northbound; no exit number southbound; exit 4 on I-695
Brooklyn Park	17.62	28.36	—	To I-895 north (Baltimore Harbor Tunnel Thruway) / MD 648 – Port of Baltimore, Ferndale	Access via I-895A
1.000 mi = 1.609 km; 1.000 km = 0.621 mi: Incomplete access
