= Maryland Route 174 =

State highway in Anne Arundel County, Maryland, United States

Maryland Route 174
- Maryland Route 174 highlighted in red

Route information
- Maintained by MDSHA
- Length: 5.94 mi (9.56 km)
- Existed: 1927–present

Major junctions
- West end: Jacobs Road near Fort Meade
- MD 170 in Severn; I-97 near Glen Burnie; MD 100 in Glen Burnie
- East end: MD 3 Bus. in Glen Burnie

Location
- Country: United States
- State: Maryland
- Counties: Anne Arundel

Highway system
- Maryland highway system; Interstate; US; State; Scenic Byways
← MD 173	→ MD 175

Maryland Route 174 (MD 174) is a state highway in the U.S. state of Maryland. The highway runs 5.94 miles (9.56 km) from Jacobs Road near Fort Meade east to MD 3 Business in Glen Burnie. MD 174 connects Glen Burnie with Severn and Fort George G. Meade in northern Anne Arundel County. The Fort Meade–Severn portion of the highway was constructed as part of MD 170, the primary highway that connected what was then Camp Meade to Baltimore, in the late 1910s. The highway was widened in the early 1940s, then became MD 554 in a number swap with the Severn–Odenton portion of MD 170. MD 174 was constructed in the early 1920s as a short road from MD 3 in Glen Burnie west to the site of the highway's modern Interstate 97 (I-97) interchange. MD 174 was extended west to Fort Meade in the early 1980s.

== Route description ==
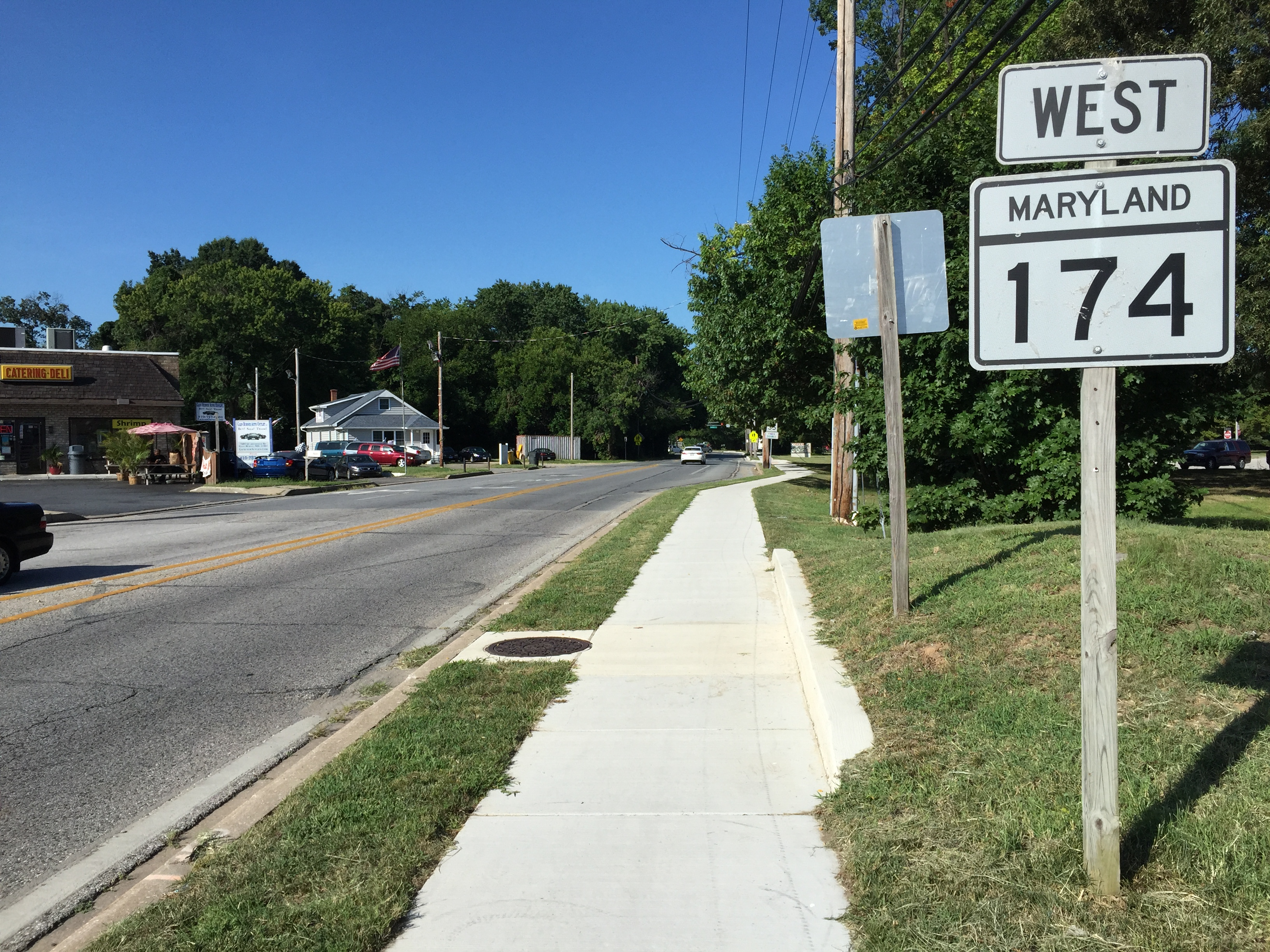
View west from the east end of MD 174 at MD 3 Bus. in Glen Burnie

MD 174 begins on the eastern edge of the Fort Meade military reservation at an intersection with Jacobs Road. Reece Road continues as a federal government–maintained public road west onto the military installation to an intersection with MD 175. MD 174 heads northeast along Reece Road, a two-lane undivided road that passes between residential subdivisions in the western part of Severn. The highway veers north then curves east and crosses over Amtrak's Northeast Corridor railroad line, which also carries MARC's Penn Line. Immediately to the east, MD 174 passes through an S-curve and temporarily expands to a four-lane divided highway through its intersection with MD 170 (Telegraph Road). The highway continues east as Donaldson Avenue, which reduces to two lanes.

MD 174 enters the southwestern part of Glen Burnie and veers northeast at its junction with Quarterfield Road, at which point the highway assumes that name and expands to a four-lane undivided road. The highway temporarily becomes divided through its partial cloverleaf interchange with I-97. East of I-97, MD 174 meets the eastern end of a piece of its old alignment, Old Quarterfield Road, which is unsigned MD 779. The highway temporarily gains a median again as it passes through its half-diamond interchange with MD 100 (Paul T. Pitcher Memorial Highway). The interchange only allows access from MD 174 to eastbound MD 100 and from westbound MD 100 to MD 174. North of that interchange, the highway intersects Thelma Avenue and reaches its eastern terminus at MD 3 Business (Robert Crain Highway). There is no direct access from northbound MD 3 Business to westbound MD 174; that movement is made via Thelma Avenue.

== History ==
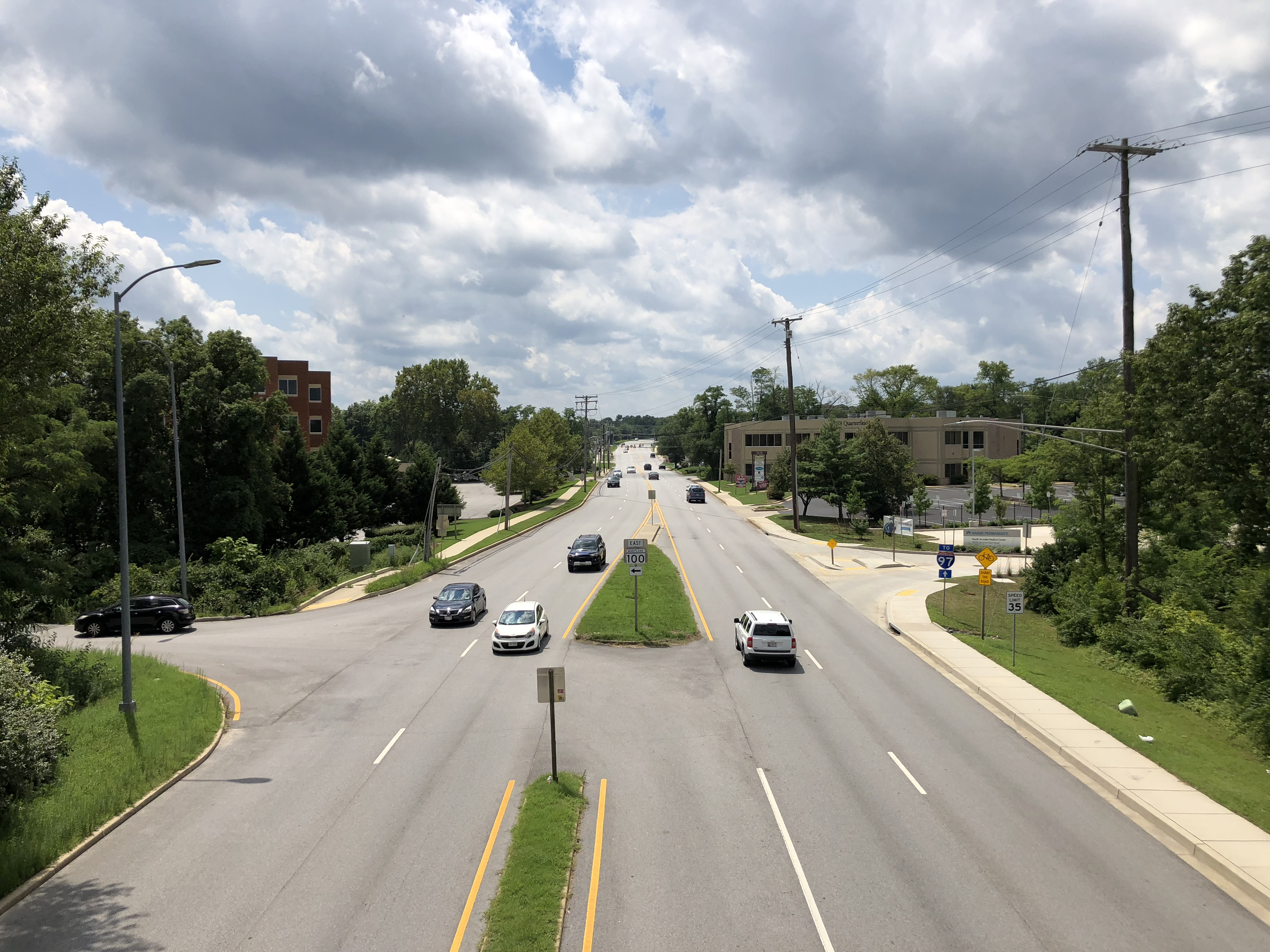
MD 174 westbound viewed from MD 100 in Glen Burnie

When the Maryland State Roads Commission applied numbers to state highways, they assigned MD 170 to its current corridor from Severn to Brooklyn Park and to what is now MD 174 from Severn to Fort Meade. The portion of the modern highway from Odenton to Severn was originally MD 554. A section of highway from the current MD 170–MD 174 intersection in Severn west to the Pennsylvania Railroad (now Amtrak's Northeast Corridor) was built as a 14-foot (4.3 m) wide concrete road by 1915. Construction on the highway from Linthicum to Fort Meade became a high priority with the United States' entrance into World War I; the remainder of the Severn–Linthicum highway and the highway from the railroad at Severn southwest to newly established Camp Meade, now collectively called the Camp Meade Road, were paved in 14-to-16-foot (4.3 to 4.9 m) wide concrete between 1916 and 1919.

MD 170 was relocated at the railroad crossing when the highway's overpass of the Pennsylvania Railroad was completed in 1931. The old road, which is now Severn Station Road west of the tracks and Old Camp Meade Road to the east, became MD 483. With the outbreak of World War II, MD 170 was designated a road of strategic importance to connect Baltimore with Fort Meade; the highway was reconstructed as a 24-foot (7.3 m) wide asphalt-surfaced concrete road in 1942. By 1946, MD 170 and MD 554 had swapped numbers, with the latter now the route from Severn to Fort Meade. MD 554 was widened and resurfaced again in 1955 and 1956.

The original segment of MD 174 was paved as a concrete road by 1921. This segment extended west from MD 3 in Glen Burnie southwest along Quarterfield Road to a spot just west of what became its partial cloverleaf interchange with the Glen Burnie Bypass (now I-97) in 1956. MD 174 was relocated for the construction of the interchange; part of the old road became MD 779. MD 174 was extended east from MD 3 Business along Aquahart Road and south along Oakwood Road to its interchange with MD 177 (now MD 100) in 1969. The state highway was rolled back to its present terminus at MD 3 Business by 1974. Donaldson Avenue, a county highway, was relocated near its western end to form a four-way intersection with MD 170 and MD 554 in 1981. In 1983, MD 174 was extended west over Quarterfield Road, Donaldson Avenue, and MD 554 to its present western terminus at the edge of Fort Meade. The state highway had been expanded to a four-lane divided highway around its intersection with MD 170 and its interchange with MD 100, and widened to four lanes on much of its Quarterfield Road segment by 1999. MD 174 was expanded from a two-lane road to a four-lane divided highway through its interchange with I-97 when that interchange was reconstructed in 2004 and 2005.

== Junction list ==
The entire route is in Anne Arundel County.

Location	mi	km	Destinations	Notes
Fort Meade	0.00	0.00	Jacobs Road south / Reece Road west – Fort Meade	Western terminus
Severn	2.48	3.99	MD 170 (Telegraph Road) – BWI Airport, Odenton	
Glen Burnie	4.94	7.95	I-97 – Baltimore, Annapolis	I-97 Exit 13
Glen Burnie	5.63	9.06	MD 100 east – Annapolis, Gibson Island, Bay Bridge	MD 100 Exit 14; no access from MD 174 to westbound MD 100 or from eastbound MD 100 to MD 174
Glen Burnie	5.94	9.56	MD 3 Bus. (Crain Highway)	Eastern terminus; no direct access from northbound MD 3 Business to westbound MD 174
1.000 mi = 1.609 km; 1.000 km = 0.621 mi: Incomplete access
