= Maryland Route 270 =

State highway in Maryland, United States

Maryland Route 270
- Furnace Branch Road
- Maryland Route 270 highlighted in red

Route information
- Maintained by MDSHA
- Length: 2.16 mi (3.48 km)
- Existed: 1932–present

Major junctions
- South end: MD 648 in Glen Burnie
- MD 10 in Glen Burnie; MD 2 in Glen Burnie
- North end: MD 3 Bus. in Glen Burnie

Location
- Country: United States
- State: Maryland
- Counties: Anne Arundel

Highway system
- Maryland highway system; Interstate; US; State; Scenic Byways
← I-270	→ MD 272

Maryland Route 270 (MD 270) is a state highway in the U.S. state of Maryland. Known as Furnace Branch Road, the highway runs 2.16 miles (3.48 km) from MD 648 north to MD 3 Business within Glen Burnie in northeastern Anne Arundel County. MD 270 was constructed between a pair of intersections with MD 2 in the early 1930s. The highway was expanded and relocated when MD 10 was constructed through the area in the mid-1970s.

== Route description ==
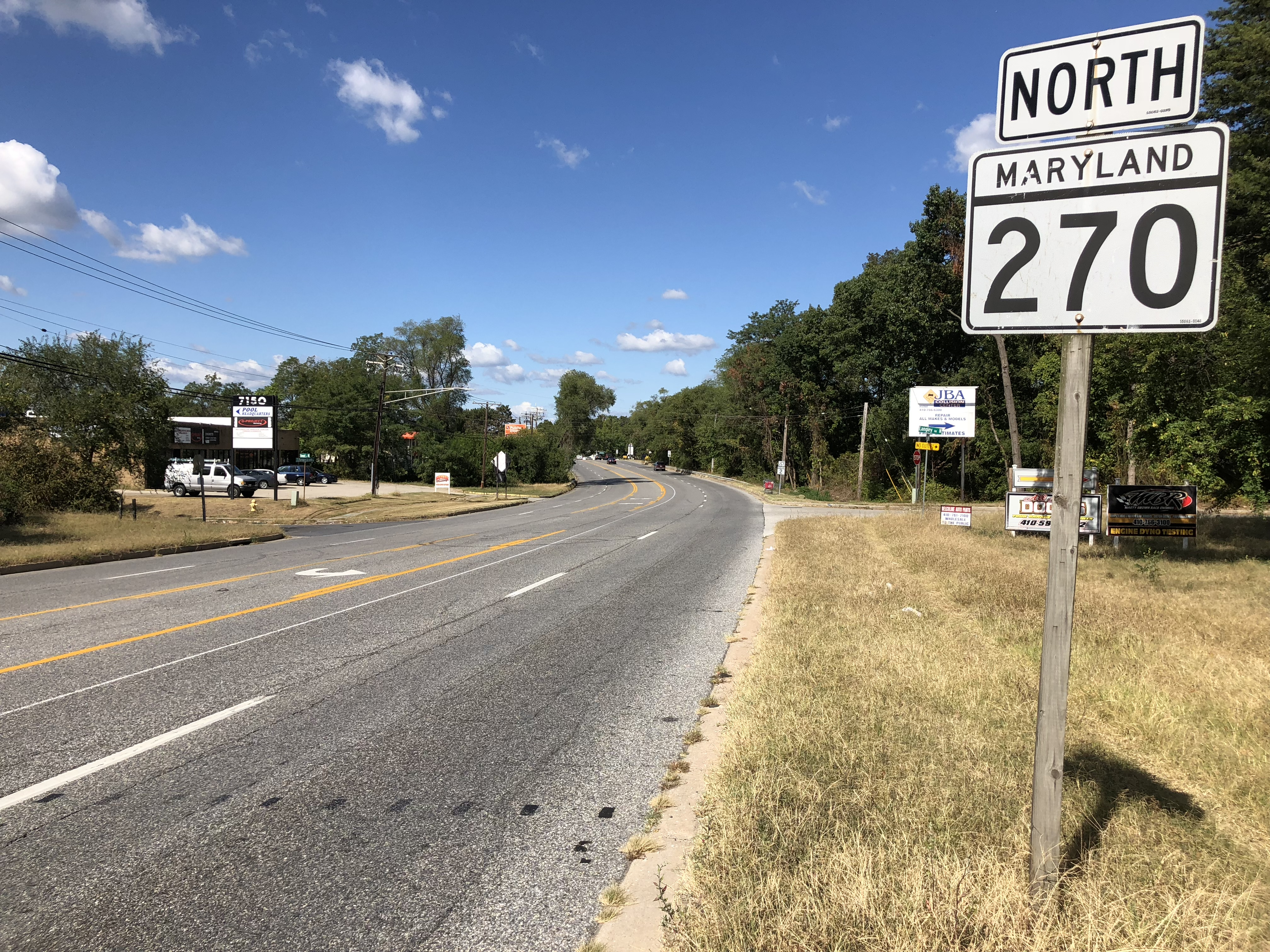
View north along MD 270 just north of MD 10 in Glen Burnie

MD 270 begins at an intersection with MD 648 (Baltimore–Annapolis Boulevard) between MD 648's interchange with MD 10 (Arundel Expressway) and Marley Creek east of the center of Glen Burnie. The highway heads north as a two-lane undivided road that parallels the northbound side of MD 10 through the Margate neighborhood of Glen Burnie. North of Thompson Avenue, MD 270 expands to a four-lane divided highway. The highway curves northwest as it passes through its partial cloverleaf interchange with MD 10. MD 270 becomes a four-lane road with a center left-turn lane ahead of its intersection with MD 2 (Governor Ritchie Highway). The highway reaches its northern terminus at MD 3 Business (Robert Crain Highway) one block west of MD 2, just south of Furnace Branch.

== History ==
MD 270 was constructed as a concrete road from MD 2 (now MD 648) east of Glen Burnie to MD 2 (now MD 3 Business) north of Glen Burnie in two sections: from the northern terminus south to Point Pleasant Road in 1931 and 1932, and from there to the southern terminus in 1932 and 1933. MD 10's interchanges with MD 270 and MD 648 were completed in 1977. As part of the construction of MD 10, MD 270 was expanded to a divided highway from MD 2 to Thompson Avenue and its southern terminus was relocated further east along MD 648.

== Junction list ==
The entire route is in Glen Burnie, Anne Arundel County.

mi	km	Destinations	Notes
0.00	0.00	MD 648 (Baltimore–Annapolis Boulevard) – Pasadena	Southern terminus
1.56	2.51	MD 10 (Arundel Expressway) to I-695 – Baltimore, Severna Park	Partial cloverleaf interchange
2.09	3.36	MD 2 (Governor Ritchie Highway) – Glen Burnie, Brooklyn Park	
2.16	3.48	MD 3 Bus. (Robert Crain Highway)	Northern terminus
1.000 mi = 1.609 km; 1.000 km = 0.621 mi
