= Iglehart (surname) =

Iglehart is a surname. Notable people with the surname include:

- Floyd Iglehart (1934–1987), American football player
- Harriet S. Iglehart (1927–2021), American equestrian, philanthropist, writer
- James Iglehart (born 1949), American actor
- James Monroe Iglehart (born 1974), American stage actor and singer
- John K. Iglehart, American editor
- Joseph Iglehart (1891–1979), American financier, media executive, and sports executive
- Philip L. B. Iglehart (1913–1993), Chilean polo player
- Stewart Iglehart (1910–1993), American rancher, ice hockey player, and polo player

== See also ==
- Iglehart, historic house in Maryland, U.S.
