= Maryland Route 3 =

State highway in Maryland, US

Maryland Route 3
- Robert Crain Highway
- Maryland Route 3 highlighted in red

Route information
- Maintained by MDSHA
- Length: 9.56 mi (15.39 km)
- Existed: 1927–present

Major junctions
- South end: US 50 / US 301 in Bowie
- MD 450 near Bowie; MD 424 in Crofton; MD 175 in Millersville
- North end: I-97 / MD 32 near Millersville

Location
- Country: United States
- State: Maryland
- Counties: Prince George's, Anne Arundel

Highway system
- Maryland highway system; Interstate; US; State; Scenic Byways
← MD 2	→ MD 4

Maryland Route 3 (MD 3), part of the Robert Crain Highway, is the designation given to the former alignment of U.S. Route 301 (US 301) from Bowie, Maryland, United States, to Baltimore. It is named for Robert Crain of Baltimore. It is unique in Maryland in that it has a business route and a truck route which do not connect to their parent; however, the business route is also a part of the Robert Crain Highway. MD 3's current orientation is vestigial from the construction of Maryland's freeway system.

== Route description ==
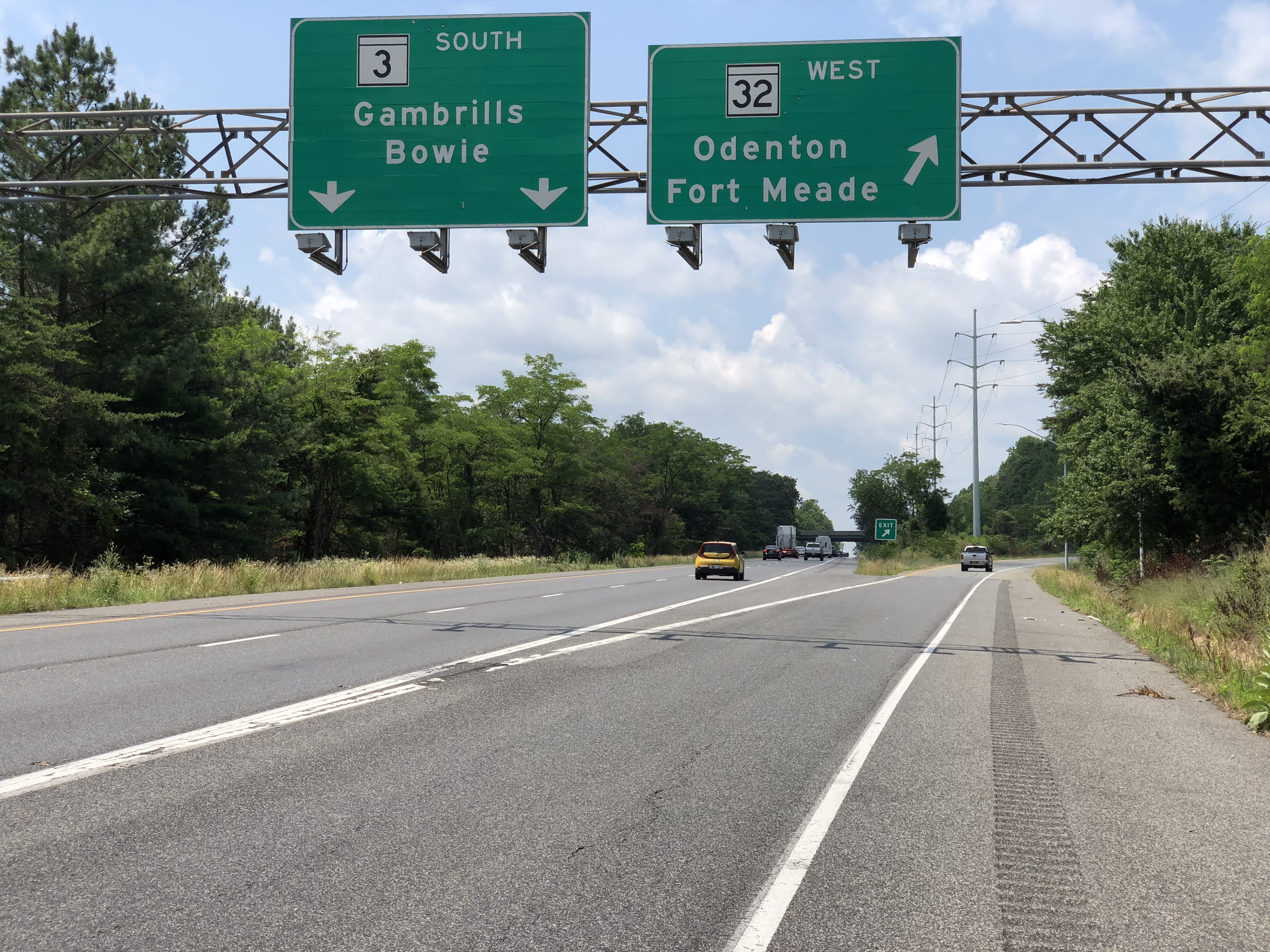
View south along MD 3 at MD 32 near Millersville

MD 3 begins within the modified cloverleaf interchange of US 50 and unsigned I-595 (John Hanson Highway) and US 301 (Robert Crain Highway) in Bowie, Prince George's County. Within the interchange, US 301 heads south on Crain Highway and east along US 50; meanwhile, MD 3 heads north on Crain Highway, a four-lane divided highway. A short distance after beginning, the route comes to a partial cloverleaf interchange with Belair Drive, containing continuing connections from the US 50/US 301 interchange. Past here, the road runs north through wooded residential areas before the median widens and it bends to the north-northeast, continuing through forested areas with a few businesses. MD 3 continues northeast and the median narrows, with the road widening to eight lanes as it comes to an intersection with MD 450. At this point, MD 450 heads northeast for a concurrency with MD 3 along a six-lane divided highway, running through wooded areas and coming to a bridge over the Patuxent River.

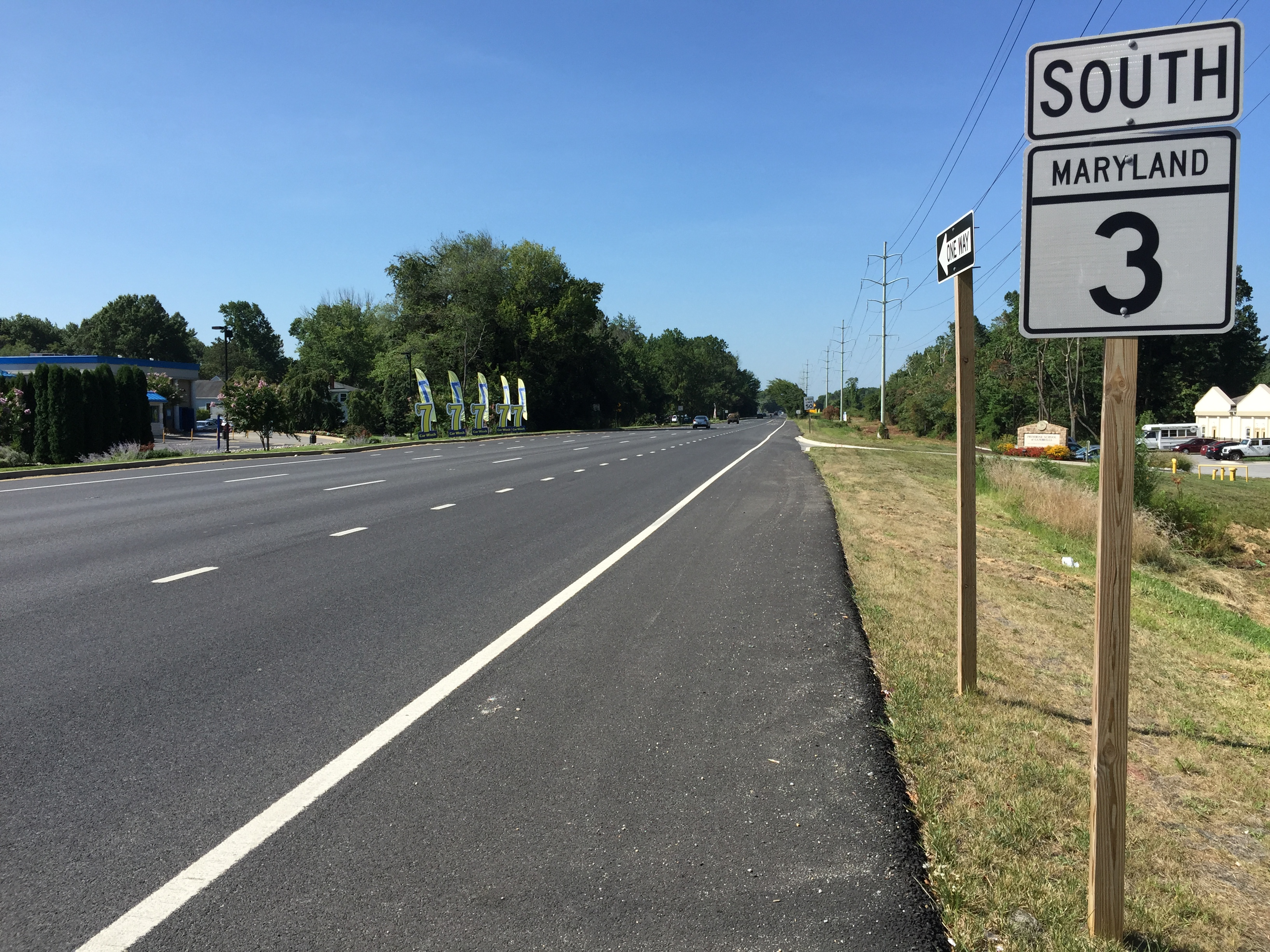
View south along MD 3 near MD 175 in Millersville

Upon crossing the Patuxent River, the road enters Anne Arundel County and continues northeast, with MD 450 splitting from MD 3 by turning to the east. MD 3 continues north along Crain Highway into Crofton, passing between woodland to the west and residential subdivisions to the east. The road heads into a commercial area and comes to an intersection with the northern terminus of MD 424. At this point, the route turns to the northeast and the median widens to include businesses in the center. MD 3 heads into Gambrills and runs through more commercial areas. The median narrows as the road passes to the southeast of the Waugh Chapel Towne Center shopping center and runs between businesses to the northwest and residential neighborhoods to the southeast. The median widens again and the route narrows to four lanes at the St. Stephen's Church Road intersection, passing through a mix of fields, woods, and businesses. The road comes to an intersection with the eastern terminus of MD 175 in Millersville before it heads northeast through woodland. MD 3 comes to its northern terminus at a modified cloverleaf interchange with I-97 and the eastern terminus of the MD 32 freeway. I-97 passes under MD 3 and occupies its median for a very short distance, with MD 3 ending at ramps merging into northbound I-97. The roadway of MD 3, however, continues for a minor distance longer, the southbound carriageway turning and crossing underneath I-97 to join with the northbound on the east side of the Interstate, and continuing north as Veterans Highway, running parallel to I-97 and providing access to MD 178.

== History ==
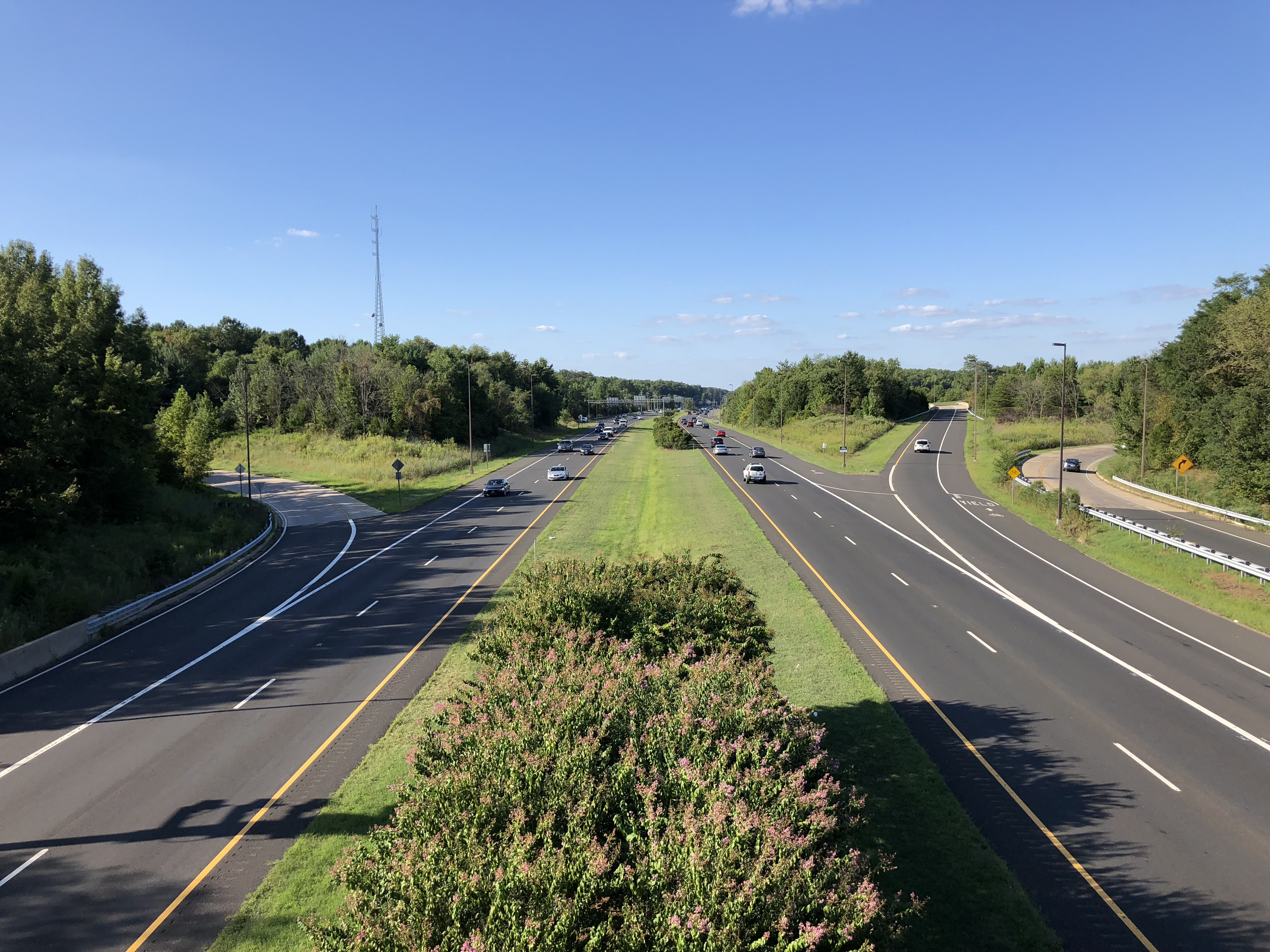
MD 3 northbound past US 50/US 301 near Bowie

In the past, Crain Highway originally held the designation MD 3, then US 301, and it currently carries both of these designations on different sections.

Started in 1922, Crain Highway was a new road built by the Maryland State Road Commission and ran from Baltimore to Southern Maryland. The original route of MD 3, completed in 1927 on a greenfield alignment, was once designated Maryland Route 761. With the opening of the Harry W. Nice Bridge in 1940 it was joined with U.S. Route 301. After the Chesapeake Bay Bridge was built in 1952, US 301, which at that time ran along the current alignment of MD 3, was rerouted along US 50, across the Bay Bridge, and north to Wilmington, Delaware, as a bypass around the Baltimore-Washington Metropolitan Area. The former US 301 north of US 50 was then given back the MD 3 designation. After the construction of I-97, MD 3 was cut back to the I-97/MD 32 interchange, which led to the oddity of MD 3 Business in Glen Burnie being completely orphaned from its parent route. Despite this, the route is still designated MD 3 Business.

If MD 3 existed as a continuous route between its original southern end near Cobb Island (now signed as MD 254 and MD 257) and its original northern end at US 1 (Wilkens Avenue) in southwestern Baltimore, running via US 301, Interstate 97, short segments of the Baltimore Beltway and the Baltimore-Washington Parkway, and Monroe Street in downtown Baltimore, it would be 74.69 miles long. MD 3 was routed via the Beltway and the Parkway to divert it from city streets; originally it followed what is now MD 648 (Baltimore-Annapolis Boulevard) into Baltimore, meeting Monroe Street within today's interchange between the Parkway and Interstate 95.

The current alignment of the route was upgraded to a divided highway as US 301 in 1954.

Interstate 297
- Location: Bowie–Millersville
- History: Withdrawn from request.

The route is severely congested; attempts to bypass it with new routings have failed. One such routing would have been Interstate 297, a direct freeway link between Interstate 97 and US 50/US 301/I-595.

== Junction list ==
County	Location	mi	km	Destinations	Notes
Prince George's	Bowie	0.00	0.00	US 50 (John Hanson Highway) / US 301 (Robert Crain Highway) – Annapolis, Washington, Richmond	Exit 13 (US 50); southern terminus of MD 3; US 50 runs concurrently with unsigned I-595
Prince George's	Bowie	0.55	0.89	Belair Drive (MD 3E) – Melford, Bowie	Partial cloverleaf interchange; Belair Drive is unsigned MD 3E
Prince George's	Bowie	2.20	3.54	MD 450 west (Annapolis Road) – Bowie	South end of concurrency with MD 450
Anne Arundel	Crofton	2.70	4.35	MD 450 east (Defense Highway) – Annapolis	North end of concurrency with MD 450
Anne Arundel	Crofton	4.66	7.50	MD 424 south (Davidsonville Road) / Conway Road west – Davidsonville	Northern terminus of MD 424
Anne Arundel	Millersville	8.13	13.08	MD 175 west (Annapolis Road) / Millersville Road east – Gambrills	Eastern terminus of MD 175
Anne Arundel	Millersville	8.89	14.31	MD 32 west (Patuxent Freeway) to I-97 south – Odenton, Fort Meade, Columbia, Annapolis	MD 32 Exit 1; no access from southbound MD 3 to eastbound MD 32 or from westbound MD 32 to northbound MD 3; eastern terminus of MD 32
Anne Arundel	Millersville	9.23	14.85	Veterans Highway to MD 178 south	Northbound exit and southbound entrance
Anne Arundel	Millersville	9.59	15.43	I-97 north – Baltimore	Exit 7 (I-97); northern terminus of MD 3; southbound exit from and northbound entrance to I-97
1.000 mi = 1.609 km; 1.000 km = 0.621 mi: Concurrency terminus; Incomplete access

== Related routes ==
=== Maryland Route 3 Business ===
Maryland Route 3 Business
- Location: Glen Burnie
- Length: 5.08 mi (8.18 km)

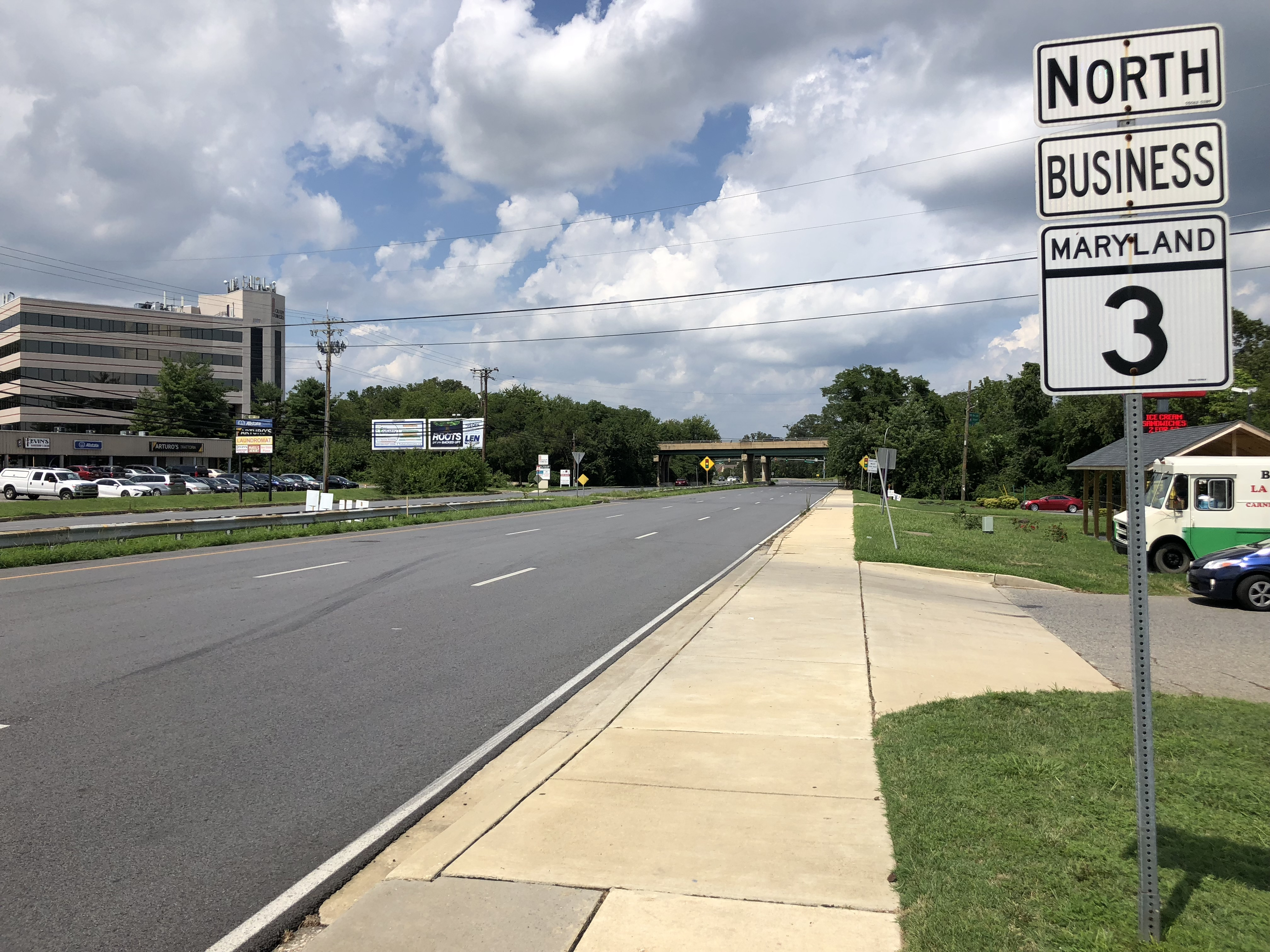
View north along MD 3 Bus. in Glen Burnie

Maryland Route 3 Business (MD 3 Bus.) is a 5.08-mile (8.18 km) business route of MD 3 through Glen Burnie and is the northernmost part of the Robert Crain Highway, connecting I-97 and MD 2. MD 3 Bus. begins on two-lane undivided New Cut Road at an arbitrary point just south of Grover Road in Severn, heading north-northeast through a mix of fields and residential neighborhoods and passing east of Archbishop Spalding High School. Past the Grover Road intersection, the route becomes a five-lane road with a center left-turn lane. MD 3 Bus. comes to an interchange with I-97 and becomes a four-lane divided highway, with the name changing to Crain Highway at the intersection with the northern terminus of Veterans Highway within the interchange. From here, the route widens to six lanes and continues through a largely commercial and residential area in Glen Burnie, curving to the north. The road passes under the MD 100 freeway without an interchange before narrowing to four lanes at the Oak Manor Drive intersection immediately after. MD 3 Bus. continues north through suburban areas, with the median transitioning to a center left-turn lane at the Madison Park Drive intersection. The road bends to the north-northeast and reaches a junction with the eastern terminus of MD 174. Following this, the route continues as a five lane road with a center left-turn lane that is lined with businesses, narrowing to a two-lane road at the 5th Avenue intersection. The road continues through residential and commercial areas, gaining a center turn lane again. At the Post 40 Road intersection, the Baltimore and Annapolis Trail crosses the route diagonally, forcing trail users to utilize two crosswalks. Immediately after, MD 3 Bus. intersects MD 648 in the downtown area of Glen Burnie. The route continues north-northeast through developed areas as a two-lane road, with MD 2 now running parallel to the route just one block to the east. Now with shoulders, MD 3 Bus. enters a heavy residential and commercial area for the remainder of its route. The route intersects the northern terminus of MD 270 before it makes a slight curve to the north. MD 3 Bus. continues north for a short distance before it reaches its northern terminus at an intersection with MD 2.

MD 3 Bus. is the only business route in the Maryland state highway system that no longer connects with its parent route. This is due to the construction of a bypass freeway, which took over the MD 3 designation as it was built; MD 3 Bus. was designated for the present business route as it was constructed. However, the freeway was later designated as I-97, and MD 3's mainline was truncated to the point at which the freeway and MD 3 deviated onto different routes, 3 miles (4.8 km) south of MD 3 Bus. Despite this, several locations on I-97 have "TO MD 3" signs posted.

Junction list
The entire route is in Glen Burnie, Anne Arundel County.

mi	km	Destinations	Notes
0.00	0.00	New Cut Road south	Southern terminus of MD 3 Bus.
0.54	0.87	I-97 – Baltimore, Annapolis	exit 12 on I-97
2.53	4.07	MD 174 west (Quarterfield Road) – Fort Meade	Eastern terminus of MD 174; no direct access from northbound MD 3 Bus. to westbound MD 174
3.34	5.38	MD 648 (Baltimore–Annapolis Boulevard)	
4.67	7.52	MD 270 south (Furnace Branch Road)	Northern terminus of MD 270
5.08	8.18	MD 2 (Governor Ritchie Highway) – Baltimore	Northern terminus of MD 3 Bus.
1.000 mi = 1.609 km; 1.000 km = 0.621 mi: Incomplete access

=== Maryland Route 3 Truck ===
Maryland Route 3 Truck
- Location: Baltimore

Maryland Route 3 Truck is an unsigned designation given to Pratt Street eastbound and Lombard Street westbound in downtown Baltimore, running from MD 295 (Greene Street) east to President Street.

The route exists despite not connecting to the current alignment of MD 3. As mentioned before, this is due to the construction of the freeways south of Baltimore taking the MD 3 designation, including MD 295. Before being given the current MD 295 designation, Paca Street and Greene Street were part of MD 3, which was the connection of MD 3 Truck to MD 3's mainline.

=== Auxiliary routes ===
- MD 3AA is an unnamed connector road that begins at Veterans Highway and travels 0.033 miles (0.053 km) to MD 3AB (Old Section MD 3) in Millersville, Anne Arundel County. The road has no connection to MD 3.
- MD 3AB is Old Section MD 3, a 0.185-mile (0.298 km) section of road with two dead ends, connecting to MD 3AA in the middle in Millersville, Anne Arundel County.
- MD 3C is the 0.69-mile (1.11 km) section of Benfield Boulevard crossing through its interchange with I-97, between a cul-de-sac west of Najoles Road and ending as the road narrows east of Veterans Highway near Millersville, Anne Arundel County. The road has no connection to MD 3.
- MD 3D is the 0.26-mile (0.42 km) section of Brightview Drive crossing I-97, between Grover Road and Veterans Highway in South Gate, Anne Arundel County. The road has no connection to MD 3.
- MD 3E is the 0.52-mile (0.84 km) section of Belair Drive which passes through its interchange with MD 3, starting from Kendale Lane and ending at the roundabout at Science Drive and Melford Boulevard in Bowie, Prince George's County.
- MD 3F is the 0.29-mile (0.47 km) section of Governor Bridge Road which intersects US 301 just south of the US 50 interchange in Bowie, Prince George's County. It continues east to Ourismans Way. The road has no connection to MD 3.
- MD 3G is a 0.50-mile (0.80 km) section of Old Crain Drive, starting at Science Drive and continuing north to Oxford Court in Bowie, Prince George's County. The road has no connection to MD 3, but runs just east of it for a short stretch.
