= Iglehart, Maryland =

Unincorporated community in Maryland, United States

Iglehart
- Unincorporated community
- Location within the state of Maryland Iglehart (the United States)
- Coordinates: 39°00′42″N 76°34′03″W
- Country: United States
- State: Maryland
- County: Anne Arundel
- Time zone: UTC-5 (Eastern (EST))
  - Summer (DST): UTC-4 (EDT)

Iglehart is an unincorporated community in Anne Arundel County, Maryland, United States. Iglehart was listed on the National Register of Historic Places in 1973.
