= Iglehart =

Historic house in Maryland, United States

- U.S. National Register of Historic Places
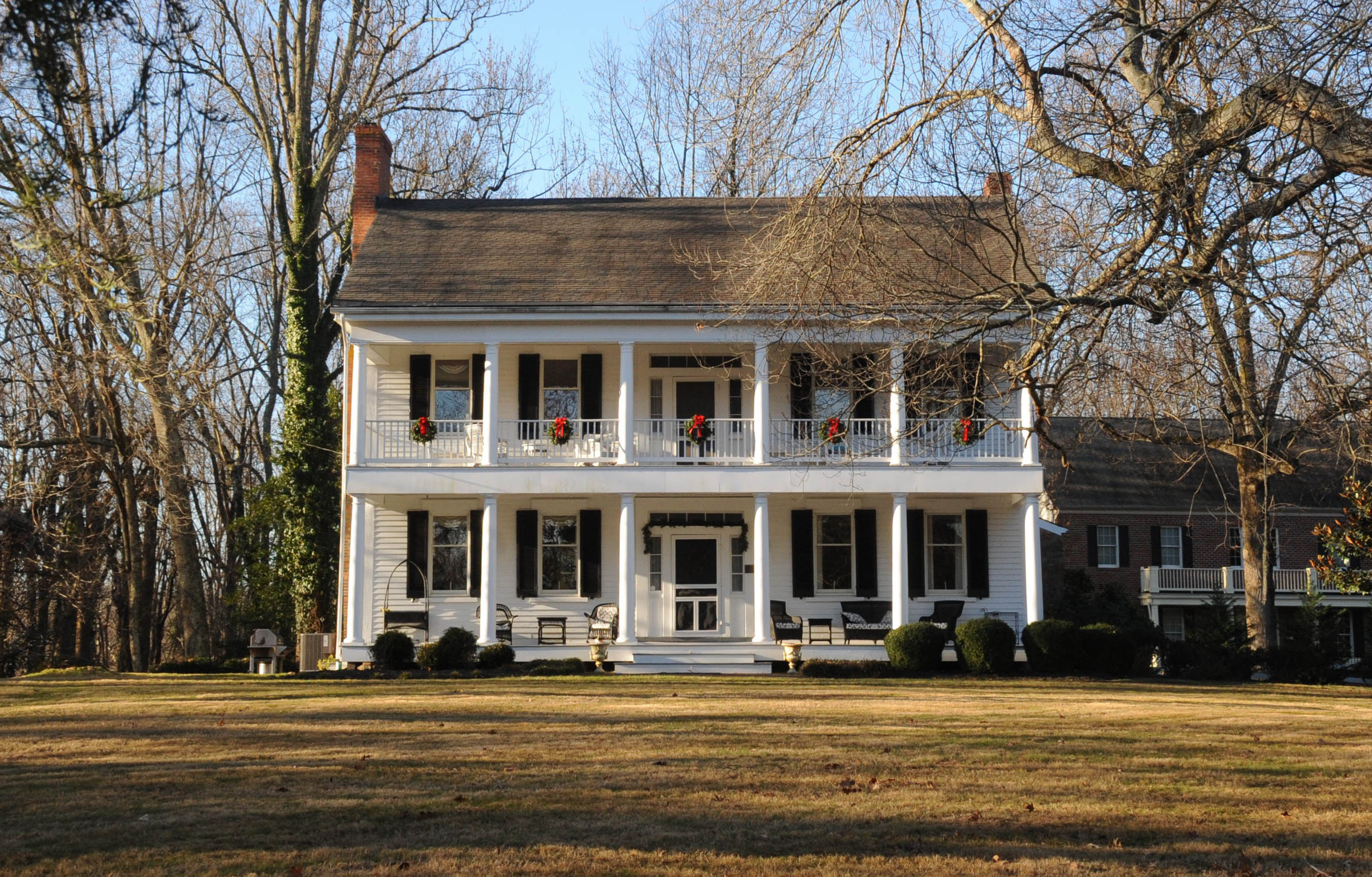

- Location within Maryland Location within the United States
- Location: MD 178, Iglehart, Maryland
- Coordinates: 39°0′37″N 76°34′4″W
- Built: c. 1830
- Architectural style: Greek Revival
- NRHP reference No.: 73000896
- Added to NRHP: March 7, 1973

For people with the surname, see Iglehart (surname).

Iglehart is a historic home at Iglehart, Anne Arundel County, Maryland, United States. It is a 2 1/2-story Greek Revival-style frame house with a gable roof, built about 1830. Its owner, Leonard Iglehart, served as a commissioner for the primary schools in Anne Arundel County from 1834 until 1838. He was also one of the six original commissioners of the Annapolis and Elk Ridge Railroad, which was incorporated by an act of the Maryland General Assembly in December 1836.

Iglehart was listed on the National Register of Historic Places in 1973.
