= Curtis Bay Depot =

Former United States military facility

Coordinates: 39°11′39.56″N 76°35′28.50″W

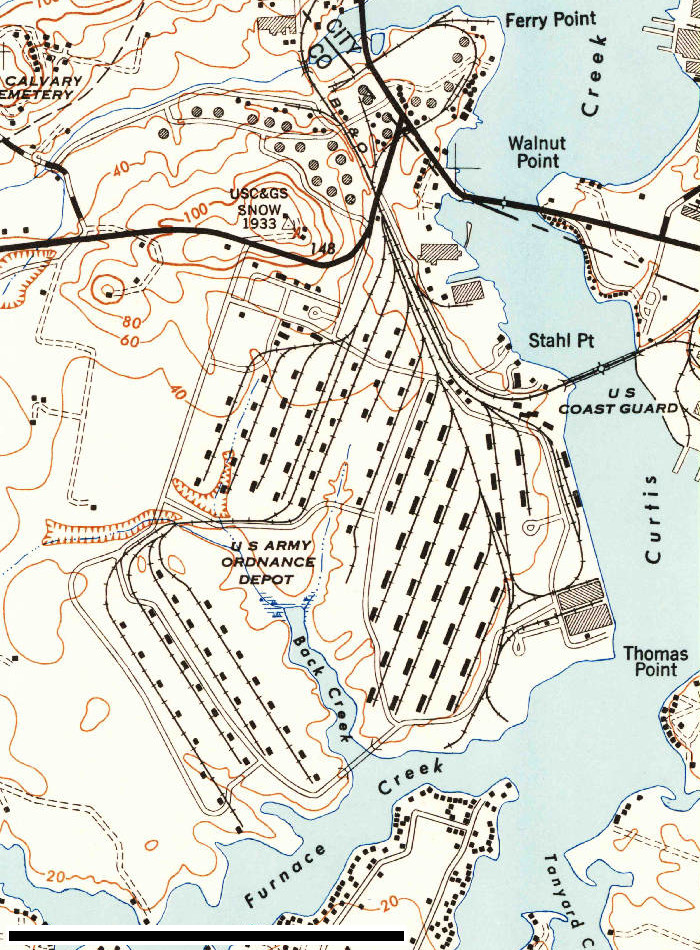
Curtis Bay Depot in 1946, showing its original extent

Defense Logistics Agency (DLA) Curtis Bay Depot is a former logistics center run by the Defense National Stockpile Center under the Defense Logistics Agency, and was a United States Army depot from 1918 to 1954. It is located in Curtis Bay, Maryland. Capital Gazette editor Jimmy DeButts proposed developing the currently unused land into a sports tourism complex.

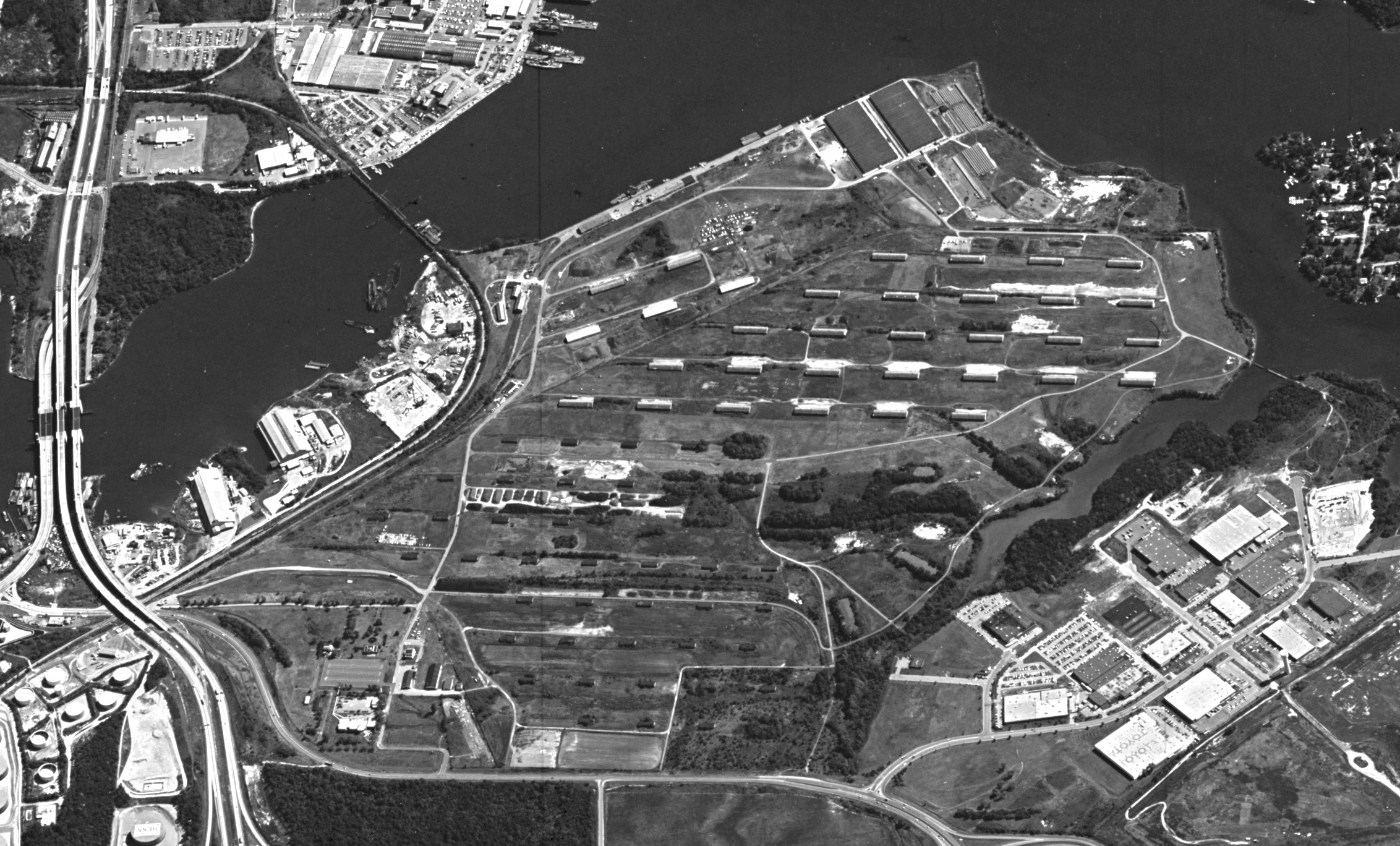
Oblique view of Curtis Bay Depot in 1984. North is to the left.

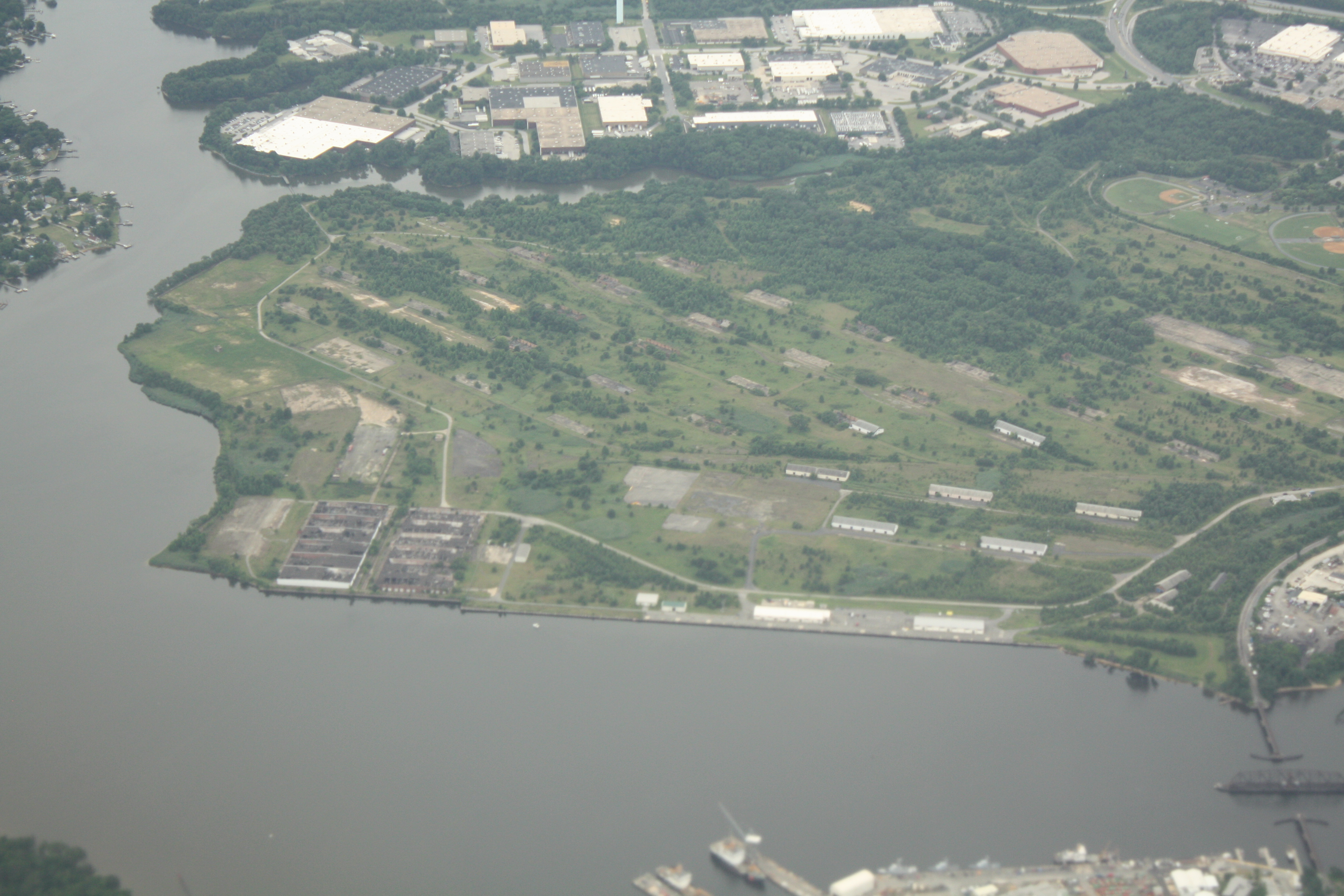
Another oblique view in July 2022

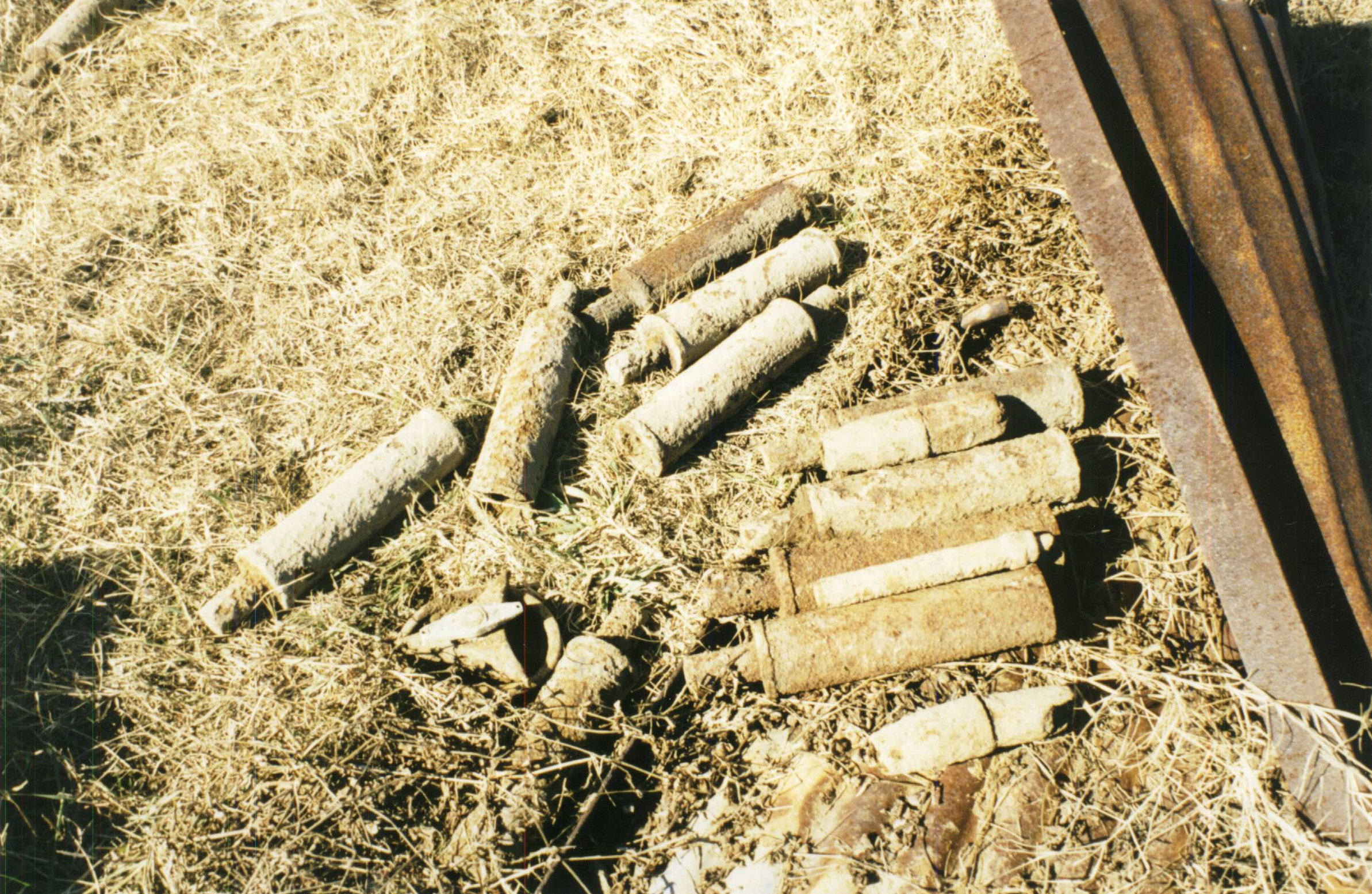
Stokes mortars and other munitions debris found at Curtis Bay Depot in 1999
