= Gwynns Falls Trail =

Coordinates: 39°16′48″N 76°39′40.5″W

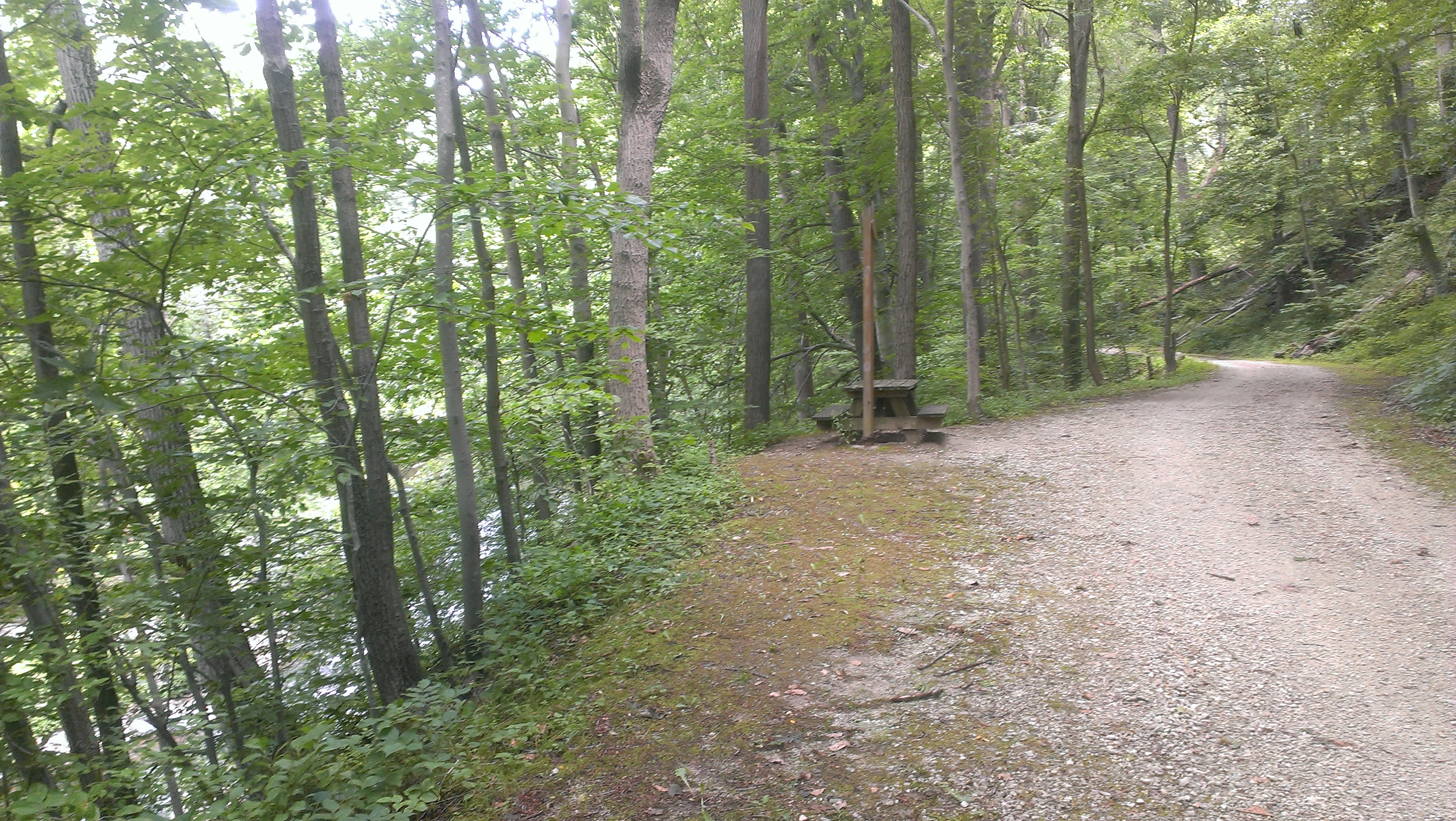
- Westbound, approaching the Windsor Mill Road trailhead
- Length: 15 mi (24 km)
- Location: Gwynns Falls Leakin Park, Baltimore, Maryland, United States
- Established: 1999
- Trailheads: Harbor Hospital Waterview Avenue; Inner Harbor/Visitors Center; Carrollton Park Golf Course; Frederick Avenue; Leon Day Park; Windsor Mill Road; Leakin Park/Winans Meadow Franklintown/I-70
- Use: Bicycling, hiking, fishing, rollerblading, bird-watching
- Season: Year-round
- Months: Year-round
- Surface: Asphalt, concrete, crushed gravel
- Website: http://www.gwynnsfallstrail.org/

Gywnns Falls Trail is a 15-mile (24 km) series of hiking and bicycling trails inside Baltimore, Maryland, named for the Gwynns Falls, whose course it follows, and the surrounding Gwynns Falls Leakin Park it passes through. The trail uses unique alignments, sidepaths on existing streets, and on-street sections. The trail consists of one 10.75-mile (17.30 km) mainline, plus a number of branches, including the Middle Branch Trail, the Hutton Trail, and the Dickeyville Trail. All of these trails carry signage designating them as the Gwynns Falls Trail; their individual names are designated on the mile markers designating their route. The entirety of the Middle Branch Trail, as well as the section of the mainline trail east of the Middle Branch Trail's northern terminus, are part of the East Coast Greenway.

Established in 1998, Gwynns Falls Trail currently operates as a public-private partnership: it is owned and managed by the City of Baltimore, while the Parks & People Foundation coordinates community involvement, volunteer activities and events along the trail.

== Route description ==
=== Mainline ===
The Gwynns Falls Trail mainline (abbreviated "GF") runs 10.75 miles (17.30 km) from Baltimore's Inner Harbor to the Park and Ride facility at the end of Interstate 70 (which had been planned to cut through the park and end at Interstate 95, with a spur route, Interstate 170, branching off to the east and leading to downtown through the residential areas of West Baltimore; however, vehement community and environmental opposition helped put an end to these plans), located at the park boundary at the city/county border. The zero mile of the Gwynns Falls Trail mainline is along a sidepath to the east of Light Street, at the Conway Street intersection. Here, the Gwynns Falls Trail encounters the Jones Falls Trail, which travels north on Light Street on the sidepath to eventually enter the Jones Falls valley. At this point, the Gwynns Falls Trail is a part of the East Coast Greenway, as is the Jones Falls Trail, which continues north.

The Gwynns Falls Trail travels south one mile to the Lee Street intersection, where it splits for its two directions due to the presence of one-way streets. The westbound trail leaves the sidepath and goes east onto Lee Street, then turns south onto Sharp Street to recombine with its opposing direction at the Henrietta Street intersection. The eastbound trail travels east along Henrietta Street, turning south onto Light Street, then immediately east again onto Warren Street. It then turns north on William Street and crosses Key Highway to take the aforementioned sidepath.

Once recombined at the Sharp-Henrietta intersection, the Gwynns Falls Trail passes south through Solo Gibbs Park on a unique path until it meets another alignment of Sharp Street. It continues until the street turns west and becomes Stockholm Street. When the street ends, it encounters the northern terminus of the Middle Branch Trail, which turns south onto Warren Street. The East Coast Greenway also exits from the Gwynns Falls mainline here. The trail's mainline, however, turns north onto Warren Street, utilizing bicycle lanes and immediately crossing the tracks of the Baltimore Terminal Subdivision at-grade. It and the bike lanes turn west onto Ostend Street, passing by M&T Bank Stadium, home stadium of the Baltimore Ravens, and crossing underneath Russell Street. The trail's route then turns south onto Ridgely Street, once again crossing the Baltimore Terminal Subdivision at-grade before encountering a one-way pair of Bayard Street (westbound) and Bush Street (eastbound), which have bicycle lanes. These streets cross the Baltimore Terminal Subdivision one last time. After utilizing these two streets, the Trail crosses Washington Boulevard and enters Carroll Park, where the route turns south to follow the street. As it exits the park, a dedicated sidepath follows the boulevard as it approaches Interstate 95.

Just before I-95, the trail turns westward into Carroll Park Golf Course, and finally enters the heavily wooded Gwynns Falls stream valley, running close to the stream. The route tunnels through the Carrollton Viaduct, the oldest stone masonry bridge built in the United States for railroad usage and currently carries the Mount Clare Branch, and immediately rises onto a bridge over the Hanover Subdivision. It then climbs up to Wilkens Avenue, utilizing its sidewalk to move west across the Gwynns Falls to a crosswalk. The route then travels north, meeting Frederick Avenue and travelling east across its bridge over the Gwynns Falls and Hanover Subdivision once again, using either the bike lanes or the sidewalk. Just past the bridge, it continues north on its own alignment once more, which, after entering the wooded area, widens significantly as it utilizes a section of Ellicott Driveway, a street built in 1917 and since closed to motor vehicles. The Trail crosses Baltimore Street to utilize a path beside it, passing underneath the large arch bridge carrying the Amtrak Northeast Corridor, before the trail exits onto its own alignment once more, continuing to utilize Ellicott Driveway.

The Trail continues northward along the east side of Gwynns Falls, passing west of Western Cemetery and with the Hanover Subdivision running just west of the stream, before it passes underneath the massive arch bridge carrying Edmondson Avenue across the Gwynns Falls. Beyond this, the trail turns sharply west, leaving the Ellicott Driveway alignment, which continues north from here and open to motor vehicles. The Trail bridges a bend in the stream with the Hanover Subdivision passing directly above, and enters Leon Day Park from the south. The Trail utilizes a loop that completely encircles the park and exits to the north, running parallel to Franklintown Road and passing underneath Hilton Parkway. It then crosses Morris Road; the Trail turns to follow the path here, climbing up a very steep grade and its surface changing to crushed gravel. The gravel surface continues for roughly 2.4 miles (3.9 km), first following high above Franklintown Road but then curving to the north with the Gwynns Falls, until it returns to asphalt at Windsor Mill Road. Roughly halfway down the gravel section, the trail meets two long, unsigned trail entrances, both of which are paved in asphalt as they utilize sections of Chesholm Road and Holly Avenue closed to motor vehicles.

The Trail uses a segregated path on the Windsor Mill Road bridge, after which the Dickeyville Trail branches off to the north. The Gwynns Falls Trail mainline turns south, however, utilizing a section of Wetheredsville Road closed to motor vehicles. Along this stretch, the Hutton Trail branch leaves to the west. Just before approaching Franklintown Road again, the Trail narrows and travels west, leaving the Gwynns Falls valley and now running parallel to the Dead Run. The trail runs toward the Leakin Park parking lot, with two branches around the lot. Once across a bridge, the trail continues westward, close to Franklintown Road, utilizing two switchbacks to climb the steep grades. Along this stretch, another unnamed trail branch leaves to the south, a sidepath running alongside Winans Way. At William Street, the trail moves onto Franklintown Avenue, which utilizes traffic calming measures such as speed bumps as it passes between several homes. At Dogwood Road, the trail enters its own alignment south of Franklintown Road for the last time, and has a long curve alongside a ramp exiting Security Boulevard, Security Boulevard itself, and a ramp exiting what was once Interstate 70. The Trail comes to its eastern end at the I-70 Park and Ride, which until 2014 was the national eastern terminus of Interstate 70 and sits atop the city-county line.

=== Hutton Trail ===
The Hutton Trail utilizes a stretch of Hutton Avenue closed to motor vehicles. It begins along the stretch of the Gwynns Falls Trail utilizing Wetherdsville Road. The trail's route follows a steep grade out of the Gywnns Falls valley for roughly 1 mile (1.6 km) before terminating at the section of Hutton Avenue open to motor vehicles, at Carrie Murray Nature Center, connecting it to Windsor Mill Road. The Hutton Trail section is not identified by pavement markers, but has its own mileposts stating its name.

=== Middle Branch Trail ===
The Middle Branch Trail (abbreviated "MB") is mostly a dedicated bike path that runs 5 miles (8.0 km) from its northern terminus at its intersection with the Gwynns Falls Trail mainline to a parking lot at Harbor Hospital, located on Hanover Street. The entire route is part of the East Coast Greenway.

The Middle Branch Trail begins on Warner Street, travelling south one block. Before Alluvion Street, it turns west onto a unique bike path running against the Middle Branch of the Patapsco River and behind the Greyhound bus terminal. The path crosses two bridges along its route. It comes back to meet the northern terminus of the Baltimore–Washington Parkway's freeway section, splitting from it immediately and running to the east of Annapolis Road. The bike path then turns onto Clare Street, crossing the Baltimore Light Rail tracks, then turning south onto Kloman Street and Wenburn Street, which run parallel to the Light Rail tracks and its Westport station. Along these two streets, the South Baltimore Industrial Track crosses at an oblique angle, along with several other abandoned railroads.

At Waterview Avenue, the trail re-enters its own bike path just before the intersection, running parallel to and north of it, and crossing the South Baltimore Industrial Track once again. The trail passes through Middle Branch Park, running alongside the Patapsco River. In doing so, it passes underneath the Hanover Street Bridge. The trail is lined by a number of fishing piers and bird-watching stands. The Trail ends by curving around Harbor Hospital's parking lot, terminating once it enters the lot. The East Coast Greenway continues into the parking lot up to the Reedbird Avenue intersection, where it turns south to use the Maryland Route 2 bridges, extending down the Bellegrove Sidepath to the BWI Trail and the Baltimore and Annapolis Trail.

An extra extension of the Middle Branch Trail continues south underneath the bridges of Hanover Street and Potee Street over the Patapsco River, terminating at a loop around a playground. The crossing underneath the two bridges has extremely low clearance and possesses a sign requiring bicyclists to dismount.

=== Dickeyville Trail ===
The Dickeyville Trail (abbreviated "DV") utilizes a section of Wetherdsville Road closed to motor vehicles, continuing across Windsor Mill Road from the stretch that the Gwynns Falls Trail uses. It continues north about 0.75 miles (1.21 km) to the section of Wetherdsville Road open to motor vehicles at the park boundary.

== Future ==
Several expansions of the Gwynns Falls Trail are planned near the downtown area. The on-street section between Carroll Park and the Middle Branch is to be bypassed with a designated path that follows the Gwynns Falls. This also includes a proposal to rehabilitate the abandoned bridge over the Middle Branch itself into a bike-ped bridge which connects Westport with Federal Hill. Additionally, the Middle Branch Trail system is planned to be extended southward through the undeveloped land parallel to the Baltimore Light Rail, toward Anne Arundel County.

As part of the Baltimore Red Line project, the stub of Interstate 70 that exists inside the Beltway was planned to be removed; bicycling advocates in Baltimore City proposed retaining the bridge structure over Security Boulevard or its abutments for a safer crossing and a Gwynns Falls Trail extension. However, the Red Line project was cancelled in early 2015 (although it was revived in 2023); Interstate 70 was truncated to the Beltway in 2014, and the stub end is now designated (but not signed) as MD 570.
