= Stadium/Federal Hill station =

Light rail station in Baltimore, Maryland, US

Coordinates: 39.2787°N 76.6202°W

Stadium/Federal Hill
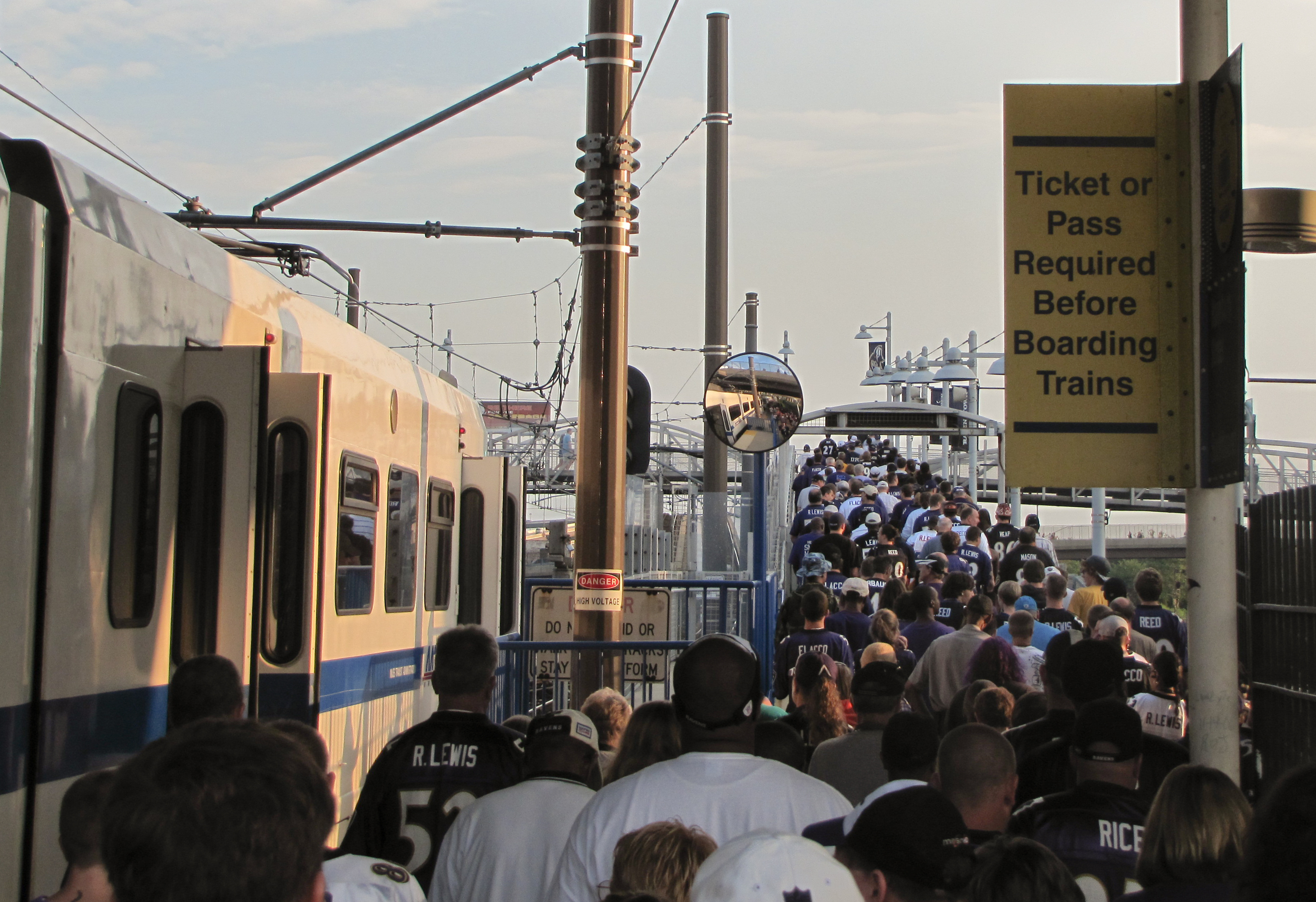
- Game day crowd at Stadium/Federal Hill station in 2010

General information
- Location: 1102 South Howard Street, Baltimore, Maryland
- Owner: Maryland Transit Administration
- Platforms: 2 side platforms
- Tracks: 2
- Connections: Greyhound Terminal; Gwynns Falls Trail

Construction
- Accessible: Yes

History
- Opened: September 6, 1998
- Former names: Hamburg Street (1998–2017)

Passengers
- 2017: 235

Services
| Preceding station | Maryland Transit Administration | Following station |
|---|---|---|
| Westport toward BWI Airport or Glen Burnie | Light RailLink | Camden Yards toward Hunt Valley |
Location

Stadium/Federal Hill station (formerly Hamburg Street station) is a Baltimore Light RailLink station in Baltimore, Maryland, located adjacent to M&T Bank Stadium. Although built to serve the stadium, it also provides access to the nearby Federal Hill and Pigtown neighborhoods.

== History ==
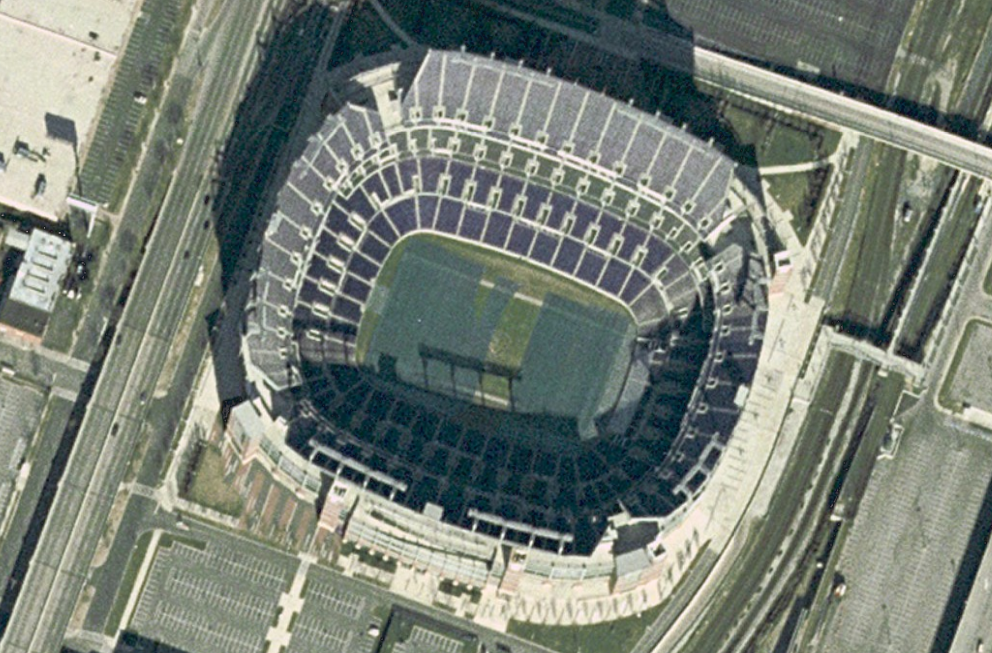
Aerial view of the stadium, with the pedestrian bridge to the station at right

The station was not part of the initial operating segment, which opened in 1992. At that time, the line ran between the I-395 viaduct and a large group of parking lots. Construction began on a new stadium for the Baltimore Ravens adjacent to the light rail line in 1996, and an infill station was added. The cost of constructing the stop was approximately $6 million - 12 times the average amount of a light rail stop - part because of a pedestrian bridge that had to be constructed to allow access to the stadium. The state contributed $5 million, with the remaining $1 million from the Ravens.

Initially, much of the light rail line outside of downtown had only one track, which forced trains to run on a tight schedule. The station opened for the first Ravens Stadium game on September 6, 1998, but it was only open for Ravens games to avoid upsetting the carefully balanced schedules. After the completion of double-tracking work on the southern half of the line, Hamburg Street station was opened for full-time service on July 1, 2005.
