= Westport station =

Westport station may refer to:

- Westport railway station (Ireland) in County Mayo, Ireland
- Westport station (Light RailLink), a Baltimore Light Rail station in South Baltimore, Maryland, USA
- Westport station (Metro-North), a Metro-North Railroad station in Westport, Connecticut, USA
- Westport station (New York), an Amtrak station in Westport, New York, USA
