= Sanitary Laundry Company Building =

Historic industrial building in Maryland, USA

- U.S. National Register of Historic Places
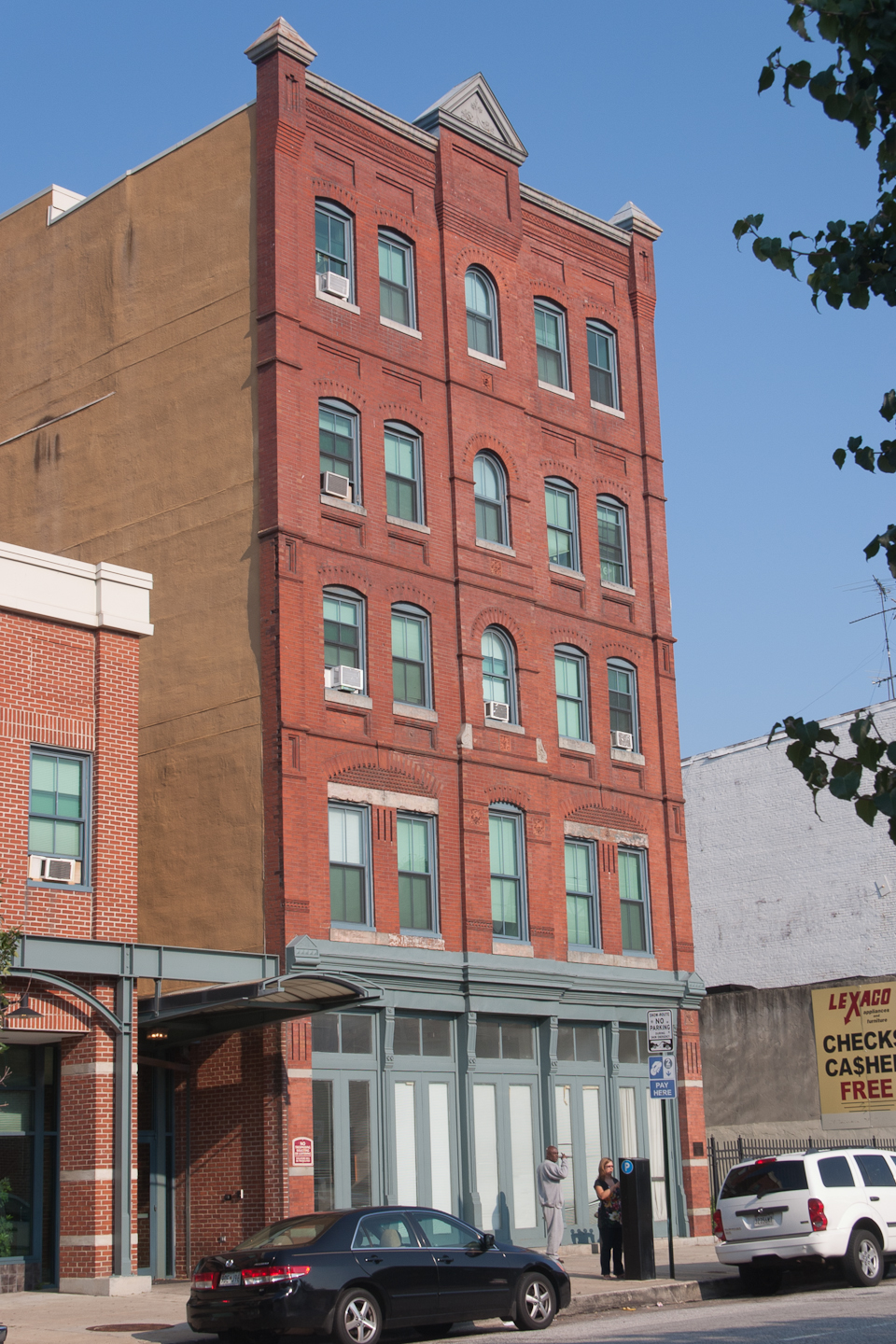
- Sanitary Laundry Company Building, August 2011

- Location within Baltimore Location within Maryland Location within the United States
- Location: 118-120 North Paca Street, Baltimore, Maryland
- Coordinates: 39°17′27.8″N 76°37′21.5″W
- Area: less than one acre
- Built: 1883
- Architectural style: Queen Anne
- MPS: Cast Iron Architecture of Baltimore MPS
- NRHP reference No.: 94001213
- Added to NRHP: October 14, 1994

The Sanitary Laundry Company Building is a historic building located at Baltimore, Maryland, United States. It is a five-bay wide, five-story brick loft building constructed in 1883. The façade features a cast-iron storefront at street level and the elaborate decorative brickwork and terra cotta ornamentation on the upper floors reflect the influence of the Queen Anne style. It was built originally as a slaughterhouse and meat packing plant until 1897, when it was converted to a commercial laundry.

The Sanitary Laundry Company Building was listed on the National Register of Historic Places in 1994.
