= M&T Bank Stadium =

Stadium in Baltimore, Maryland

- The Bank

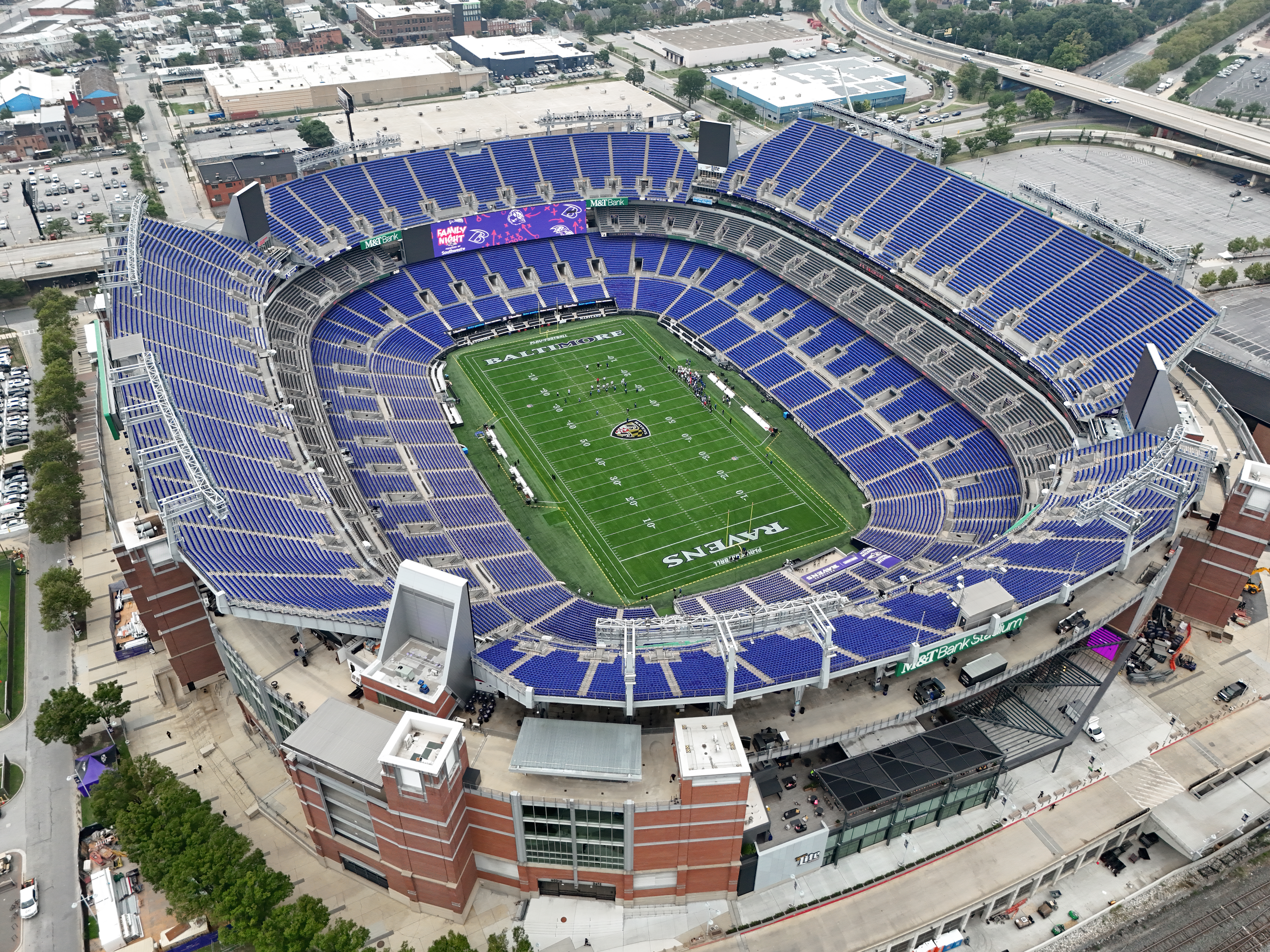
- Aerial view of the stadium in August 2025

- Location in Baltimore Location in Maryland Location in the United States
- Former names: Ravens Stadium at Camden Yards (1998–1999); PSINet Stadium (1999–2002); Ravens Stadium (2002–2003)
- Address: 1101 Russell Street, 21230
- Location: Baltimore, Maryland, U.S.
- Coordinates: 39°16′41″N 76°37′22″W
- Owner: Maryland Stadium Authority
- Operator: Baltimore Ravens
- Capacity: 70,745 (2021–present) Former capacity: List: 71,008 (2007–2020); 70,107 (2005–2006); 69,084 (1999–2004); 68,400 (1998)
- Surface: GN-1 Bermuda Grass (1998–2002); Shaw Sports Turf Momentum (2003–2009); Shaw Sports Turf Momentum 51 (2010–2015); Tifway 419 Bermuda Grass (2016–present)
- Public transit: Camden Station; Stadium/Federal Hill; MTA Maryland bus: 69, 70, 73, 75

Construction
- Groundbreaking: July 23, 1996
- Opened: August 8, 1998; 28 years ago
- Cost: US$220 million ($435 million in 2025 dollars)
- Architect: HOK Sport (now Populous)
- Project manager: Getz Ventures
- Structural engineers: Bliss and Nyitray, Inc.
- Services engineers: RMF Engineering, Inc.
- General contractors: The Whiting-Turner Contracting Company and Barton Malow JV

Tenants
- Baltimore Ravens (NFL) (1998–present); Baltimore Bayhawks (MLL) (2002)

Website
- baltimoreravens.com/stadium

M&T Bank Stadium is a multi-purpose stadium in Baltimore, Maryland, U.S. It has been the home of the Baltimore Ravens of the National Football League (NFL) since its opening in 1998. The stadium is immediately adjacent to Oriole Park at Camden Yards, home of the Baltimore Orioles. Often referred to as "Ravens Stadium" or "The Bank", the stadium has a listed capacity of 70,745 and has been praised for its fan amenities, ease of access, concessions and other facilities.

The stadium was originally known as Ravens Stadium at Camden Yards, until PSINet acquired the naming rights in 1999, naming it PSINet Stadium. It then reverted to Ravens Stadium in 2002 when PSINet filed for bankruptcy. M&T Bank bought the naming rights in 2003 and signed a 15-year, $75 million contract with the Ravens, which was brokered by Team Services, LLC. The naming rights deal for M&T Bank Stadium was renewed in 2023, extending the name through 2037.

== History ==
Ground was broken for the new stadium in mid-1996, shortly after the arrival of the Ravens. The team played its first two years at Memorial Stadium. Although there was some sentiment from Baltimore residents in having the Ravens stay there permanently, it was deemed too old to host an NFL team. The Orioles moved away from Memorial Stadium after the 1991 season.

The stadium site was previously the site of the Wm. Knabe & Co. piano factory, which closed during the Great Depression. A sidewalk keyboard mosaic on the southwest corner of the stadium honors the company's legacy.

In 2003, M&T Bank acquired naming rights to the stadium. The bank had recently entered the Baltimore market with its purchase of Allfirst Bank. Two other companies were in the running to be granted naming rights to the stadium. They were reportedly Nextel and CarMax. Following the September 2002 death of Baltimore Colts quarterback Johnny Unitas, public sentiment leaned toward renaming the then-sponsorless stadium after the Baltimore icon. The Ravens and the Maryland Stadium Authority held firm in their right to negotiate naming rights fees.

In the end, the plaza in front of the main entrance to the Ravens' stadium was named "Unitas Plaza", complete with a bronze statue of the Hall of Famer. Many Ravens fans, as they enter the stadium, will rub the foot of Unitas' statue as they walk by it. The plaza formerly featured large banners, each containing a picture of Unitas in his playing days, flanking the stadium entrance. After 10 years, these were replaced by large metal 19s (Unitas' number) for the 2012 season.

In 2014, the Ravens unveiled a new statue of long-time Raven Ray Lewis next to Unitas' statue. The bronze figure depicts Lewis in the final pose of his iconic "squirrel dance", which he performed before every Ravens home game upon coming on to the field. Since 2020, the letters "MO" of Baltimore Ravens in the Stadium's endzone are painted either gold or white in honor of Baltimore sports icon Mo Gaba.

In the 2020s, M&T Bank Stadium underwent several renovations and upgrades that were completed in 2026. The $489 million project was a joint venture between the Ravens and Maryland Stadium Authority and includes a new team store, entertainment venue, bars, field-level seats, premium suites, and revamped North Plaza.

== Design ==
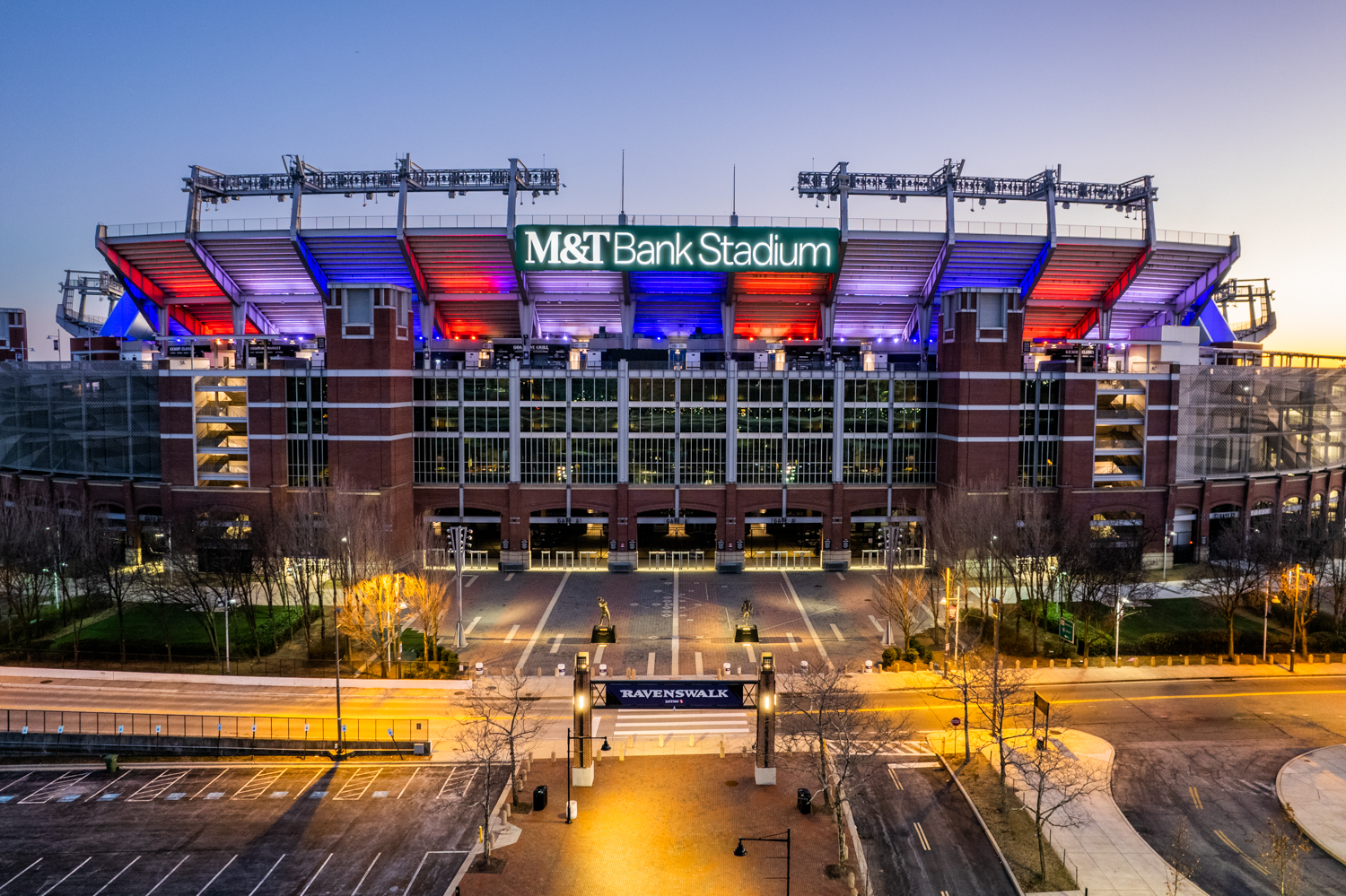
M&T Bank Stadium lit in celebration of the 2022 Winter Olympics

The stadium contains five levels, being the lower bowl, club level, 300 suites level, 400 suites level, and the upper bowl. The lower bowl contains 42 rows of seats, split into two sections. The seats below the tunnel entrances are labeled from 1 to 18, while the seats above the tunnels are labeled from 19 to 42, except in sections 123–130, which contain rows 19–35, due to the press box taking up sideline space.

On the club level, the rows are labeled from 1 to 13 on the sidelines, and 1 to 17 in the corners where no suites are located. In the upper bowl, the sideline seats are labeled from 1 to 32, while in the upper bowl end zones, the rows range from 1 to 26. Seat widths for the lower and upper bowls of the stadium vary from 19 to 21 inches, due to the curve design of the stadium, while the padded club seats range from 21 to 23 inches respectively.

The venue is served by the Stadium/Federal Hill station of the Baltimore Light Rail.

=== Playing surface ===
The stadium originally featured a natural grass surface. An artificial surface, Sportexe Momentum Turf, was installed for the 2003 season, which in turn was replaced by a new-generation Sportexe Momentum 51 in 2010. In December 2015, the Ravens announced that in 2016 the team would go back to natural grass playing surface, which is currently Tifway 419 Bermudagrass.

== Tenants ==
The Ravens are the stadium's primary tenant. On December 7, 2008, an M&T Bank Stadium then-record crowd of 71,438 watched the Baltimore Ravens defeat the Washington Redskins 24–10 on Sunday Night Football, only to be surpassed the next week when the Pittsburgh Steelers defeated the Ravens 13–9 in front of 71,502. On January 15, 2012, a record crowd of 71,547, the largest in Ravens history, was in attendance at the 2011 Divisional Playoff Game in Baltimore against the Houston Texans, which the Ravens won 20–13.

== Notable events ==
=== College football ===
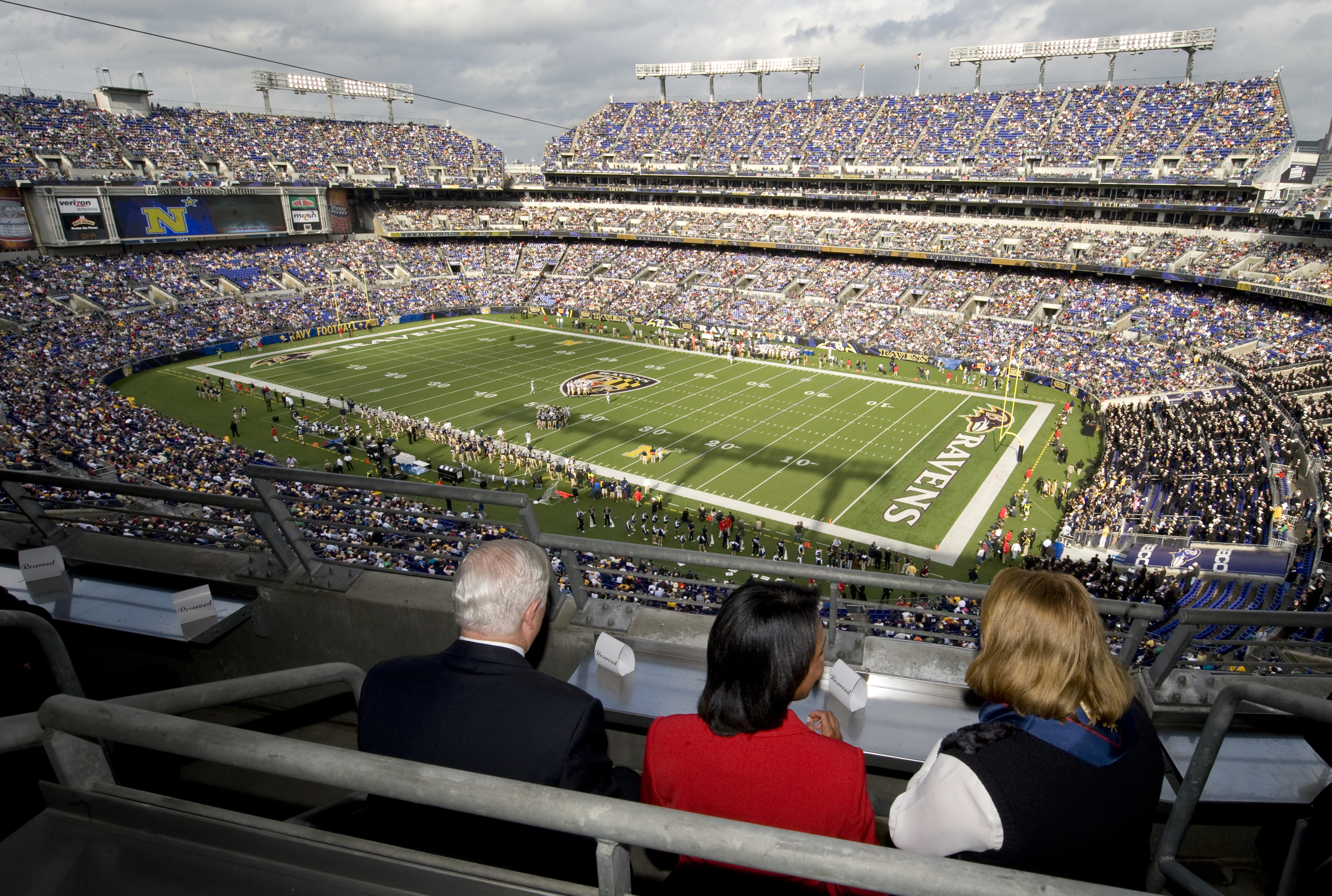
Defense Secretary Robert Gates (left), Secretary of State Condoleezza Rice (center), and Becky Gates (right) watch the Navy vs. Notre Dame football game at M&T Bank Stadium on Nov. 15, 2008.

The first college football game played at the stadium was a 15–13 homecoming victory for Morgan State over Delaware State on October 24, 1998. In 2000, the stadium hosted the Army–Navy Game for the first time and has subsequently hosted the rivalry game in 2007, 2014, 2016, and 2025.

In 2005, the stadium was the site of the first rematch in the Maryland–Navy series known as the "Crab Bowl Classic" in 40 years. The two teams played again at M&T Bank Stadium on September 6, 2010, and Maryland won 17–14.

On October 28, 2006, the stadium held a contest between Notre Dame and Navy in which Notre Dame won 38–14. In 2014, the stadium played host to Ohio State–Navy; Ohio State won 34–17.

In 2013, the annual rivalry between Maryland and West Virginia was held at the stadium.

On October 24, 2015, the stadium hosted a Big Ten match-up between Maryland and Penn State in which Penn State won 31–30.

In 2022, Notre Dame and Navy faced off at the stadium once again, with the Fighting Irish winning 35–32.

=== High school football ===
The Maryland Public Secondary Schools Athletic Association (MPSSAA) held the four state football championships for Maryland's public high schools at M&T Bank Stadium until 2016. Two Baltimore high school football rivalry games have been held at the stadium in November. Baltimore City College used to play Baltimore Polytechnic Institute every November, in one of the oldest high school football rivalries in the United States. Every Thanksgiving, Loyola Blakefield and Calvert Hall College also square off in what has now been called for many years as the Turkey Bowl, usually reaching up to 13,000 people in the audience.

Both games were once played back-to-back on Thanksgiving Day at Memorial Stadium. When City College and Polytechnic joined the MPSSAA before 1994 season, the game was forced to be played in early November, due to MPSSAA rules and playoff schedule.

=== Soccer ===
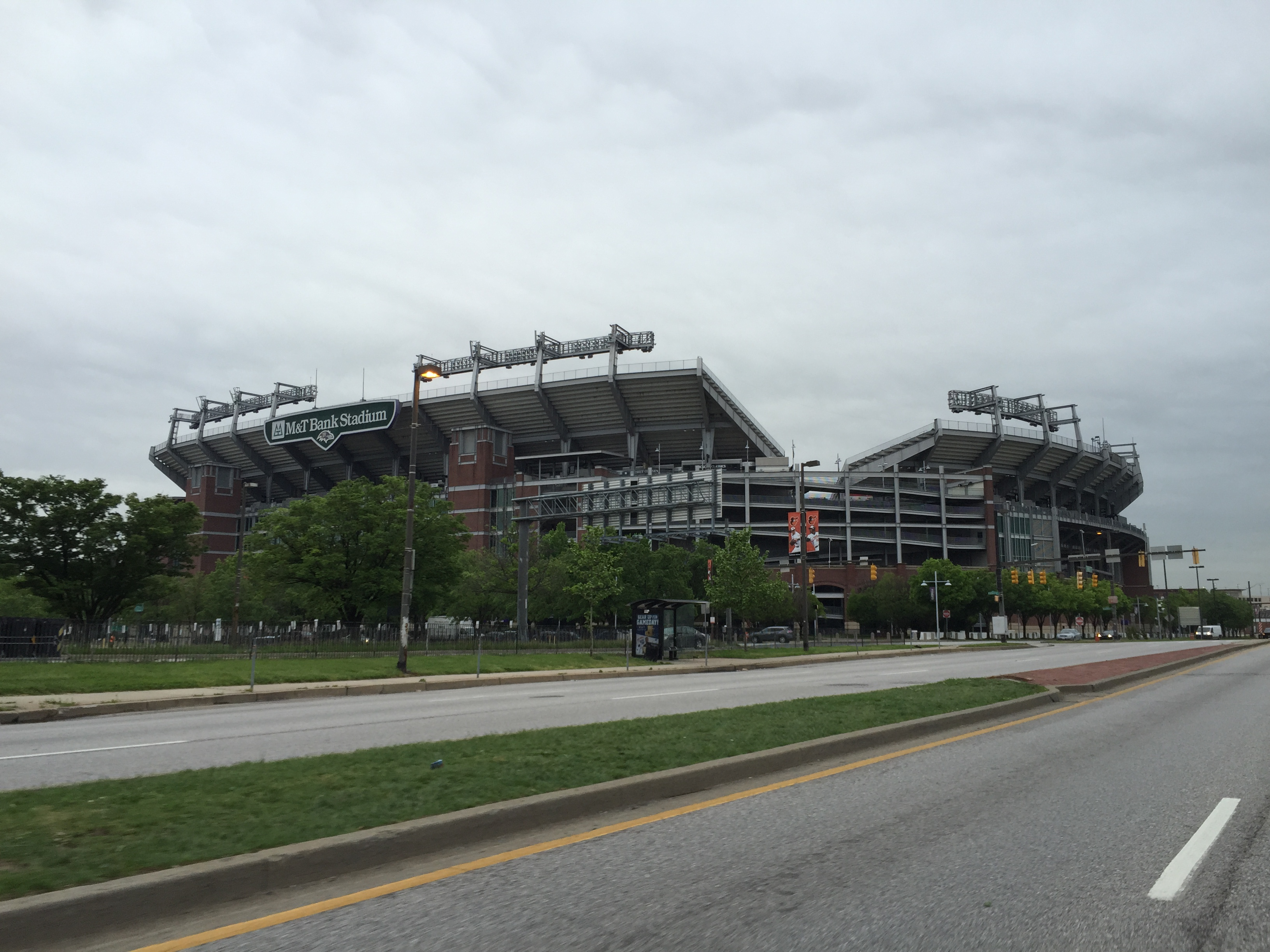
View of the stadium from Russell Street prior to renovations that occurred in the 2020s

On July 24, 2009, English Premier League club Chelsea won 2–1 against Italian Serie A team AC Milan in the first World Football Challenge at M&T Bank Stadium in front of a crowd of 71,203. On July 28, 2012, the stadium hosted a match between Premier League teams Liverpool and Tottenham Hotspur before 42,723 fans.

The stadium was a venue for the 2013 CONCACAF Gold Cup, drawing a crowd of 70,450 to watch a quarter finals doubleheader between the United States v. El Salvador, and Honduras v. Costa Rica. The 2015 CONCACAF Gold Cup had two quarterfinals games at the stadium: United States v. Cuba and Haiti v. Jamaica, played in front of 37,994 spectators.

Date	Winning Team	Result	Losing Team	Tournament	Spectators
July 24, 2009	(England) Chelsea	2–1	(Italy) Milan	World Football Challenge	71,203
July 31, 2010	(Italy) Inter Milan	3–0	(England) Manchester City	Club Friendly	36,569
July 28, 2012	(England) Liverpool	0–0	(England) Tottenham Hotspur	Club Friendly	42,723
July 21, 2013	United States	5–1	El Salvador	2013 CONCACAF Gold Cup Quarter-finals	70,540
July 21, 2013	Honduras	1–0	Costa Rica	2013 CONCACAF Gold Cup Quarter-finals	70,540
July 18, 2015	United States	6–0	Cuba	2015 CONCACAF Gold Cup Quarter-finals	37,994
July 18, 2015	Jamaica	1–0	Haiti	2015 CONCACAF Gold Cup Quarter-finals	37,994
July 16, 2022	(England) Arsenal	2–0	(England) Everton	Club Friendly	39,245
August 6, 2024	(Italy) Milan	2–2 (4–3 p)	(Spain) Barcelona	Club Friendly	51,337
March 7, 2026	(United States) Inter Miami CF	2–1	(United States) D.C. United	MLS regular season	72,026
September 26, 2026	Mexico	1–1	Colombia	International Friendly	68,173

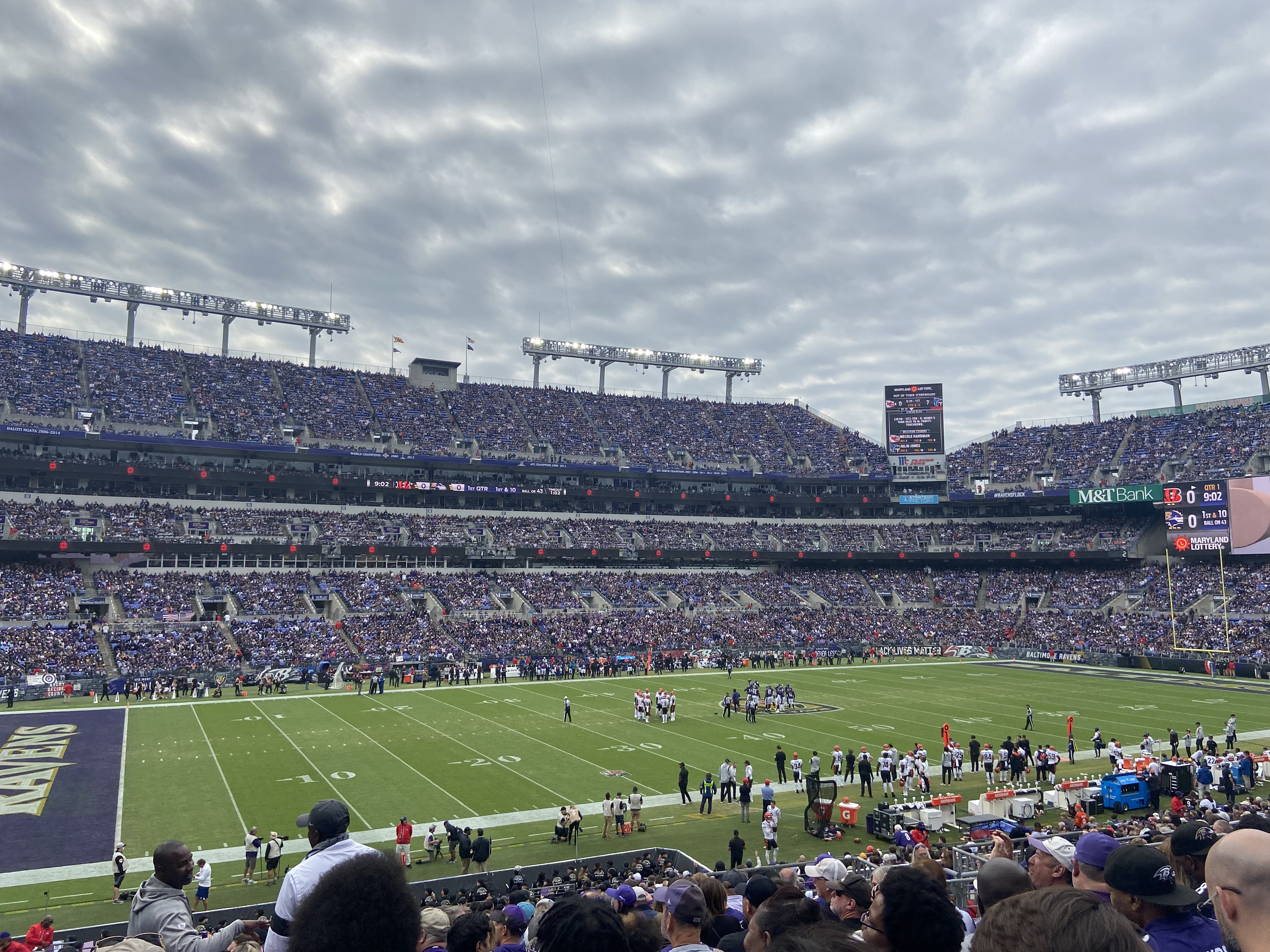
M&T Bank Stadium on October 24, 2021

=== Rugby ===
In January 2026 M&T Bank Stadium was announced as the venue for the fourth and final rugby union test of the 2026 Rugby's Greatest Rivalry tour for September 12. The match was played in front of a near-capacity crowd of 68,173, the largest-ever crowd to watch a rugby match in the USA; thus showcasing Baltimore's potential to host 2031 Rugby World Cup matches.

List of rugby union Test matches at M&T Bank Stadium
Date	Home	Score	Away	Attendance	Competition	Ref.
September 12, 2026	South Africa	43–28	New Zealand	68,173	2026 Rugby's Greatest Rivalry tour	

=== Lacrosse ===
The stadium serves as an alternate venue for the Johns Hopkins University men's lacrosse team, and was the site of the semifinals and final of the NCAA Division I Men's Lacrosse Championship in 2003, 2004, 2007, 2010, 2011, and 2014. Major League Lacrosse's Baltimore Bayhawks used the stadium as their home during the 2002 season.

=== Music and entertainment ===
Date	Artist	Opening act(s)	Tour / Concert name	Attendance	Revenue	Notes
July 4, 2000	Metallica	Korn; Kid Rock; Powerman 5000; System of a Down	Summer Sanitarium Tour	39,257 / 50,000	$2,415,205	
May 10, 2008	Kenny Chesney	Brooks & Dunn; Big & Rich; LeAnn Rimes; Gary Allan	Poets and Pirates Tour	42,316 / 45,359	$3,563,206	
June 22, 2011	U2	Florence and the Machine	U2 360° Tour	74,557 / 74,557	$6,832,510	Biggest concert in the stadium's history.
August 8, 2013	Jay-Z; Justin Timberlake	DJ Cassidy	Legends of the Summer Stadium Tour	49,668 / 49,668	$4,726,398	
July 7, 2014	Beyoncé; Jay-Z	—	On the Run Tour	51,212 / 51,212	$5,016,036	Fastest selling concert in the stadium's history.
July 25, 2015	Billy Joel	LeAnn Rimes	Billy Joel in Concert	39,662 / 39,662	$4,481,549	Billy Joel's first concert in Baltimore in nearly 40 years
August 8, 2015	One Direction	Icona Pop	On the Road Again Tour	41,467 / 41,467	$3,690,753	
June 10, 2016	Beyoncé	DJ Khaled	Formation World Tour	47,819 / 47,819	$5,770,660	Wale, Yo Gotti and Trey Songz joined DJ Khaled during the opening act.
May 10, 2017	Metallica	Avenged Sevenfold; Volbeat	WorldWired Tour	55,705 / 55,705	$5,970,421	
October 7, 2023	Billy Joel & Stevie Nicks		Two Icons - One Night 2023			
July 17, 2026	Morgan Wallen	Brooks & Dunn; Gavin Adcock; Jason Scott & The High Heat	Still the Problem Tour			
July 18, 2026	Morgan Wallen	Ella Langley; Gavin Adcock; Jason Scott & The High Heat	Still the Problem Tour			
August 10, 2026	BTS		Arirang World Tour			
August 11, 2026	BTS		Arirang World Tour			
May 18, 2027	Zach Bryan	John Fogerty; Fey Fili	Young Manhood and Other Donatable Organs Tour			
June 22, 2027	Stray Kids		Run It World Tour			

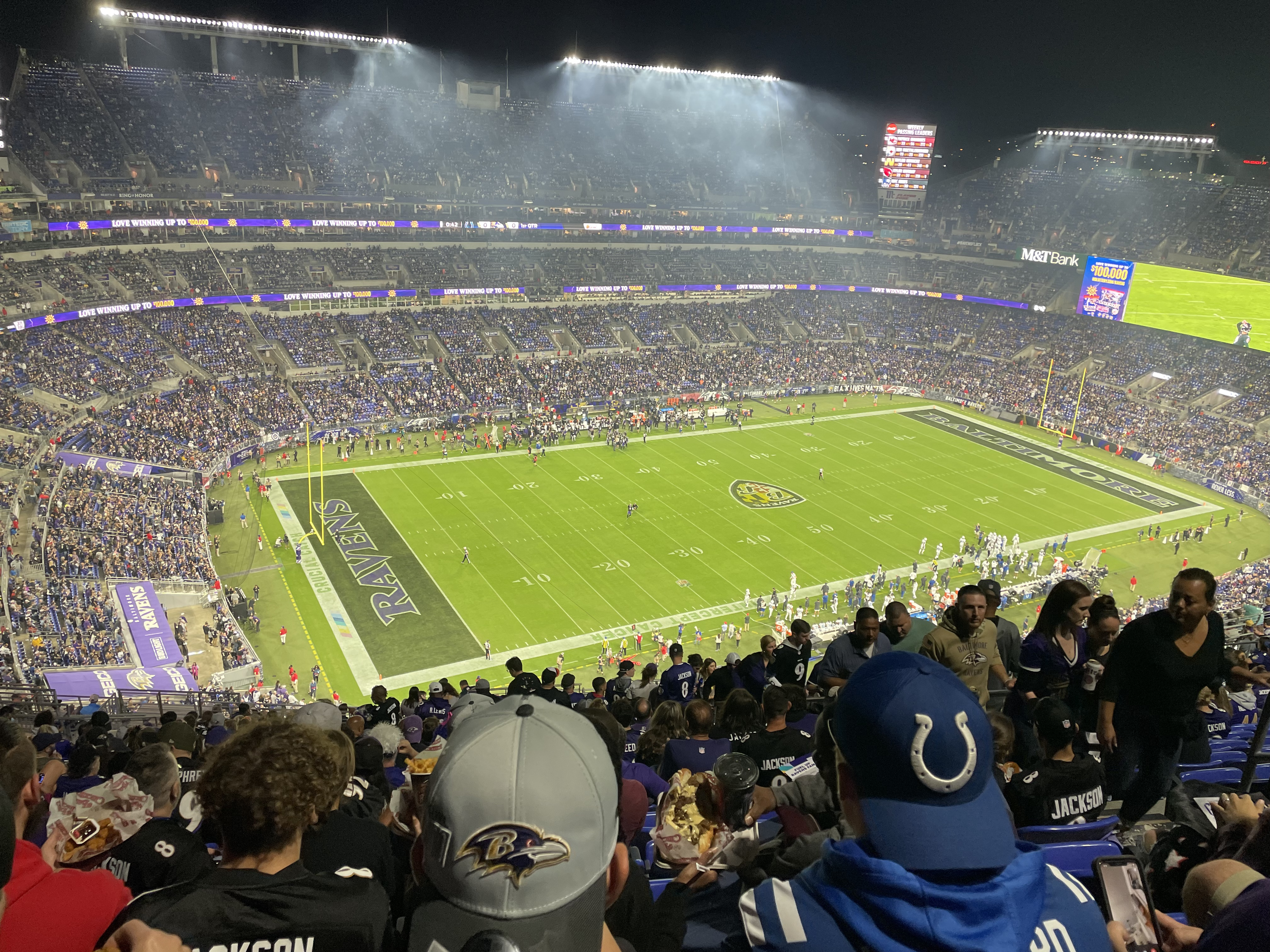
M&T Bank Stadium at night during a Monday Night Football game against the Indianapolis Colts on October 11, 2021

Popular music festival HFStival appeared at the stadium in 1999 & 2005, as Foo Fighters, Red Hot Chili Peppers, Silverchair, The Mighty Mighty Bosstones, The Offspring, Blink-182, Goo Goo Dolls, Billy Idol, and Coldplay have all played the concert.

Monster Jam was held at the stadium for the first time in 2011. Monster Jam returned for the third time on June 8, 2013.

=== Popular culture ===
It served as Nextel Stadium, the home field for the fictional Washington Sentinels in the 2000 film The Replacements. The stadium was supposed to be the location of the football game in the 2002 film The Sum of All Fears and included footage of the presidential motorcade going to the building. The stadium used for the aerial shots is the domed Olympic Stadium in Montreal, while the book used Denver as the locale for the attack.

It was featured in "Stadium," a 2013 television public service announcement which was part of the "I Want To Be Recycled" advertising campaign for Keep America Beautiful and the Ad Council. The stadium is partially constructed from post-consumer recycled aluminum.

=== COVID-19 vaccination site ===
In 2021, M&T Bank Stadium was used as a mass vaccination site in the state of Maryland during the COVID-19 pandemic in Maryland.

== See also ==
- List of American football stadiums by capacity
- Lists of stadiums

Events and tenants
Preceded by Memorial Stadium	Home of the Baltimore Ravens; 1998 – present	Succeeded by current
Preceded by Arrowhead Stadium	Host of AFC Championship Game; 2024	Succeeded by Arrowhead Stadium
Preceded by Rutgers Stadium	Home of the NCAA Lacrosse Final Four; 2003 – 2004	Succeeded by Lincoln Financial Field
Preceded by Lincoln Financial Field	Home of the NCAA Lacrosse Final Four; 2007	Succeeded by Gillette Stadium
