= Cherry Hill station (Light RailLink) =

Light rail station in Baltimore, Maryland, US

Cherry Hill
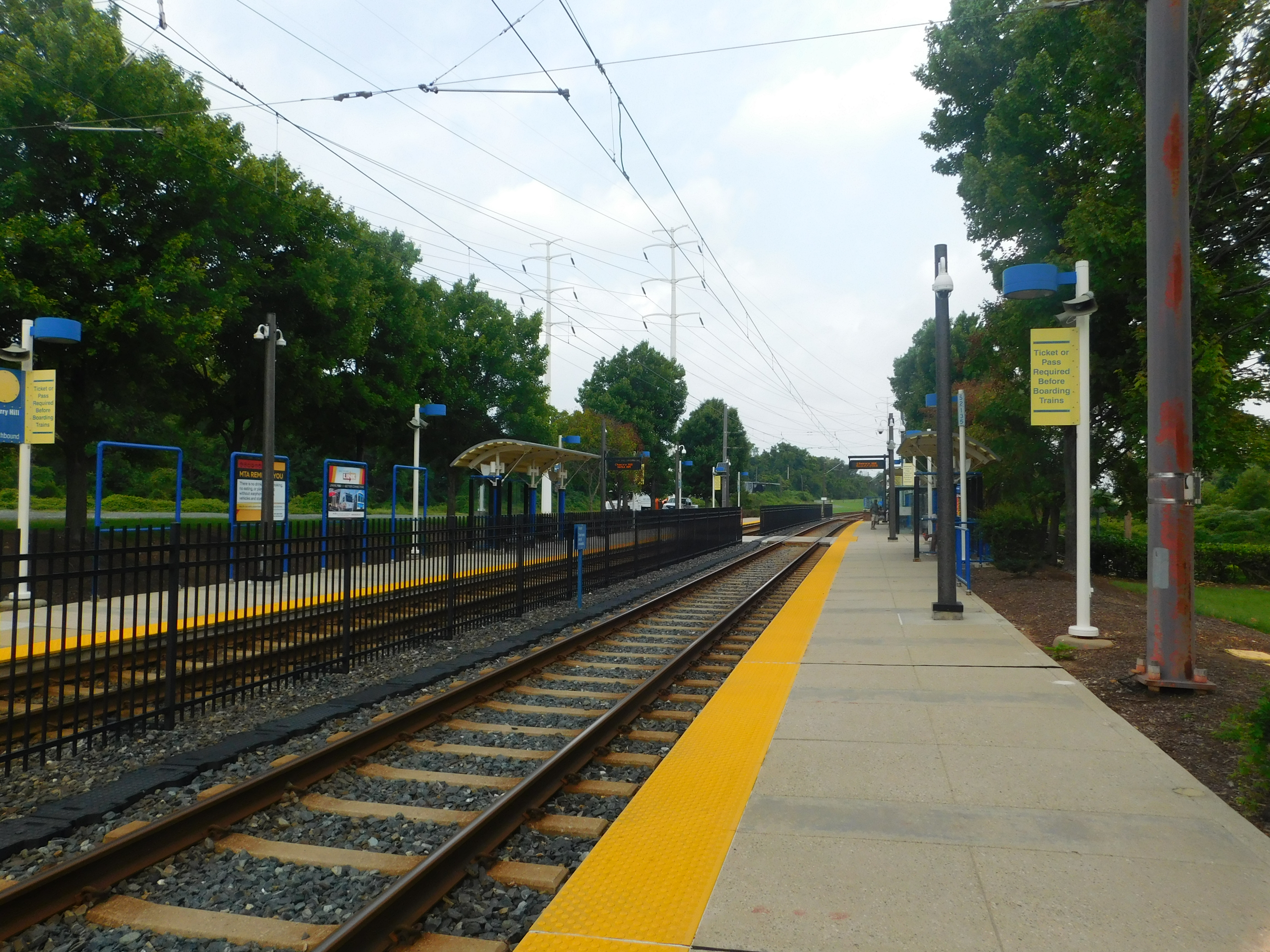
- Cherry Hill station in August 2018

General information
- Location: 1701 Cherry Hill Road; Baltimore, Maryland
- Coordinates: 39°15′21.6″N 76°38′5.8″W
- Owner: Maryland Transit Administration
- Platforms: 2 side platforms
- Tracks: 2
- Connections: 27, 29, 51

Construction
- Accessible: Yes

History
- Opened: 1993

Passengers
- 2017: 663 daily

Services
| Preceding station | Maryland Transit Administration | Following station |
|---|---|---|
| Patapsco toward BWI Airport or Glen Burnie | Light RailLink | Westport toward Hunt Valley |
Location

Cherry Hill station is a Baltimore Light Rail stop in Baltimore, Maryland.
