= Team Services, LLC =

Sports marketing firm in Rockville, Maryland, US

- Industry: Sports marketing
- Founded: 2002; 23 years ago
- Headquarters: Rockville, Maryland, United States

Team Services, LLC is a Rockville, Maryland-based sports marketing firm. Founded in 2002, Team Services had early success with the sale of the naming rights to the stadium of the NFL's Baltimore Ravens, which was sold to M&T Bank in 2003. M&T Bank signed a 15-year, $75 million contract with the Ravens, which was brokered by Team Services. The two principals of Team Services, Fred Fried and E.J. Narcise have a long history in sports marketing, with many successes in the naming rights field.

== Naming rights ==
Team Services seeks potential naming rights companies regionally, nationally and internationally. Some of the naming rights agreements that they have negotiated are:

=== KFC YUM! Center ===
The home to men's and women's basketball for the University of Louisville, the naming rights agreement for the KFC YUM! Center is considered one of the premier naming rights agreements in sports due to the local ties of the company and the marketing opportunities present in the arena. The 10-year, $13.5 million agreement began in 2010 with the opening of the arena.

=== FedEx Field ===
Home to the NFL's Washington Redskins, Team Services sold the naming rights of the stadium to the FedEx corporation in November 1999 for $205 million over 25 years. The agreement was important for the Memphis, Tennessee-based company as it gained them access to Washington, D.C.'s network of foreign embassies and international diplomats with which they could increase their global customer base. At the time of the agreement, it was the most lucrative naming rights agreement in sports history.

=== M&T Bank Stadium ===
Home to the NFL's Baltimore Ravens, Team Services secured M&T Bank as the naming rights partner for the stadium in 2003 with a 15-year, $75 million agreement. Before the agreement, M&T Bank did not rank in the top-18 banks in name recognition within the Baltimore marketplace. After the agreement, M&T Bank moved up to third in aided and unaided awareness.

== Corporate consulting ==
=== Dairy Management, Inc. ===
Team Services serves as the sports marketing agency for Dairy Management Inc, the parent company of the American Dairy Association, National Dairy Council, and US Dairy Export Council. Team Services negotiates and activates DMI's sponsorship with the NFL, negotiates all local NFL Club Sponsorships on behalf of the local state and regional promotional dairy associations, and manages all NFL player-related endorsements on behalf of the National Dairy Council. Team Services works with NFL PLAYERS, the licensing and marketing subsidiary of the NFL Players Association, to identify and secure a variety of NFL players to represent the National Dairy Council's (NDC) Children's Nutrition and Fitness Initiative in schools across the country. NDC has used many familiar faces throughout the years that span several NFL teams. NFL Players can often be seen in schools across the country, highlighted on school marketing materials that grace the walls of classrooms and school cafeterias.

=== PNC Bank ===
Team Services also serves as the marketing firm for PNC Bank. In working with PNC, Team Services has addressed PNC's strategic needs with a multi-layered approach by targeting sports, arts, cultural and historical sponsorship opportunities in the Mid-Atlantic region. Team Services negotiated the rights for PNC's title sponsorship of the 2007 Hospitality Village at the 132nd Preakness Stakes® at Pimlico Race Course. PNC Bank also increased its Mid-Atlantic presence with a presenting sponsorship of one of the most popular festivities in the Greater Baltimore region, the Inner Harbor Independence Day Celebration. Team Services aided PNC by helping the bank extend its reach and support of the local arts community through a presenting sponsorship of the Baltimore Outdoor Sculpture Exhibition in conjunction with the 26th annual Artscape, the Mid-Atlantic's largest celebration of the arts. Artscape's Outdoor Sculpture Exhibition is the keystone of the entire Baltimore Sculpture Project and provides a platform for local and national artists.

== Corporate Hospitality ==
Team Services provides its clients with event services, including events such as the Super Bowl, NCAA National Championship, PGA events, and more.

=== Super Bowl Hospitality ===
Team Services has hosted clients at each of the last 13 Super Bowls.

== Joseph Bramlett ==
The only athlete to be represented by Team Services, Joseph Bramlett is a golfer currently on the Web.com Tour. Bramlett competed on the PGA Tour in 2011, with two top-25 finishes. Competing on the Web.com Tour in 2012, Bramlett finished 28th on the money list, with the top-25 qualifying for a spot on the PGA tour the following year. In 2016, Bramlett qualified for the Safeway Open, his first PGA Tour tournament since 2011, where he finished T-35.
