= Westport station (Light RailLink) =

Westport
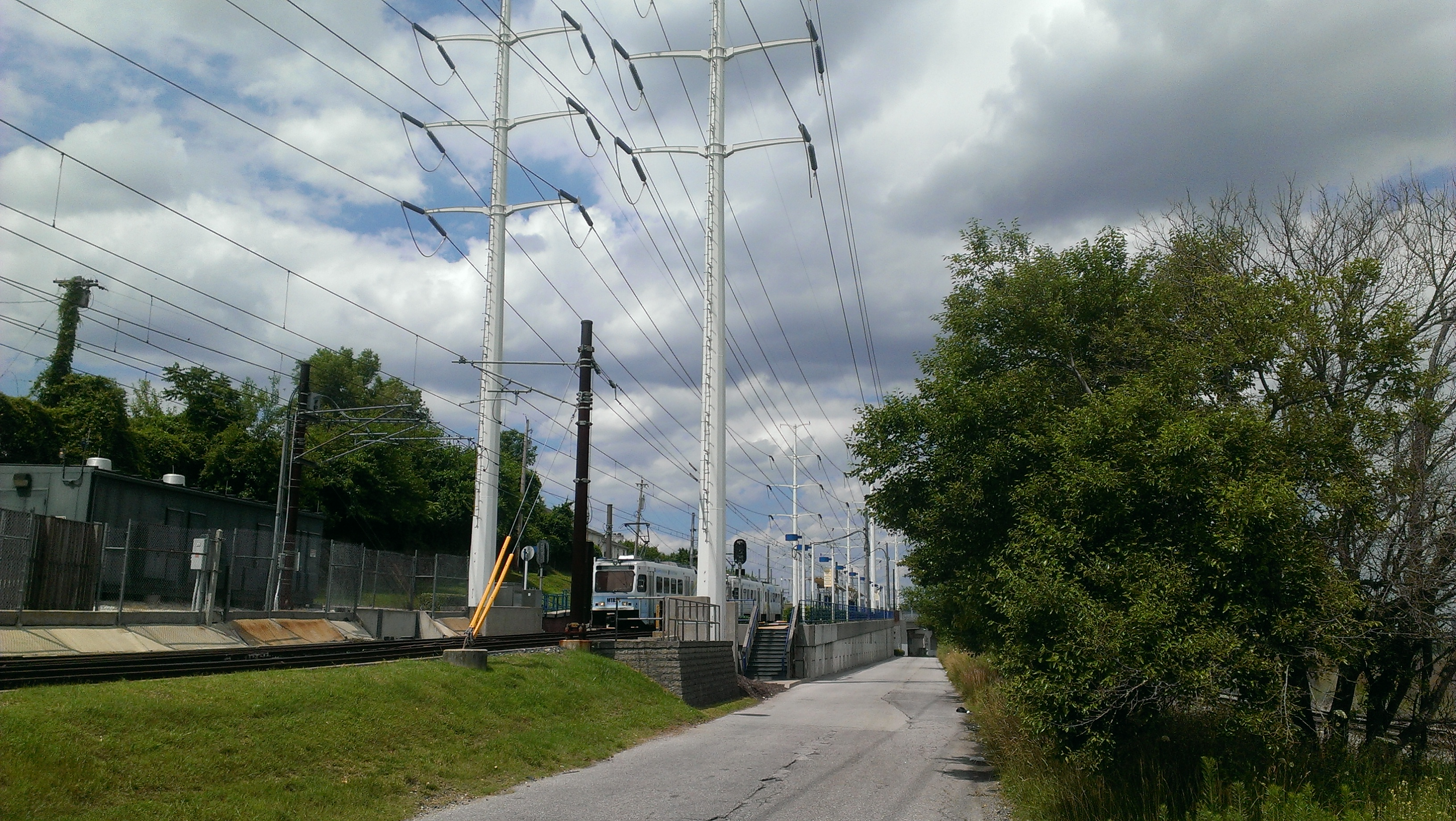
- View of station from Kloman Street

General information
- Location: 2114 Kloman Street; Baltimore, Maryland
- Coordinates: 39°15′42.6″N 76°37′55.7″W
- Owner: Maryland Transit Administration
- Platforms: 2 side platforms
- Tracks: 2
- Connections: 27; 51; Gwynns Falls Trail

Construction
- Accessible: Yes

History
- Opened: 1993

Passengers
- 2017: 604 daily

Services
Preceding station	Maryland Transit Administration	Following station
Cherry Hill toward BWI Airport or Glen Burnie	Light RailLink	Stadium/Federal Hill toward Hunt Valley
Location

Westport station is a Baltimore Light Rail station in Baltimore, Maryland. It is located north of Smith Cove on the west side of the Patapsco River in Baltimore's the Westport neighborhood. It currently has no free public parking but has connections to MTA Maryland buses 27 and 51.

== Station layout ==
G
G	Side platform, doors will open on the right
G	Southbound	← Light Rail toward BWI Airport or Glen Burnie (Cherry Hill)
G	Northbound	Light Rail toward Fairgrounds or Hunt Valley (Stadium/Federal Hill) →
G	Side platform, doors will open on the right
G	Street level	Exit/entrance
