= Hamilton Hills, Baltimore =

Neighborhood in Baltimore, Maryland, United States

Hamilton Hills
- Neighborhood of Baltimore
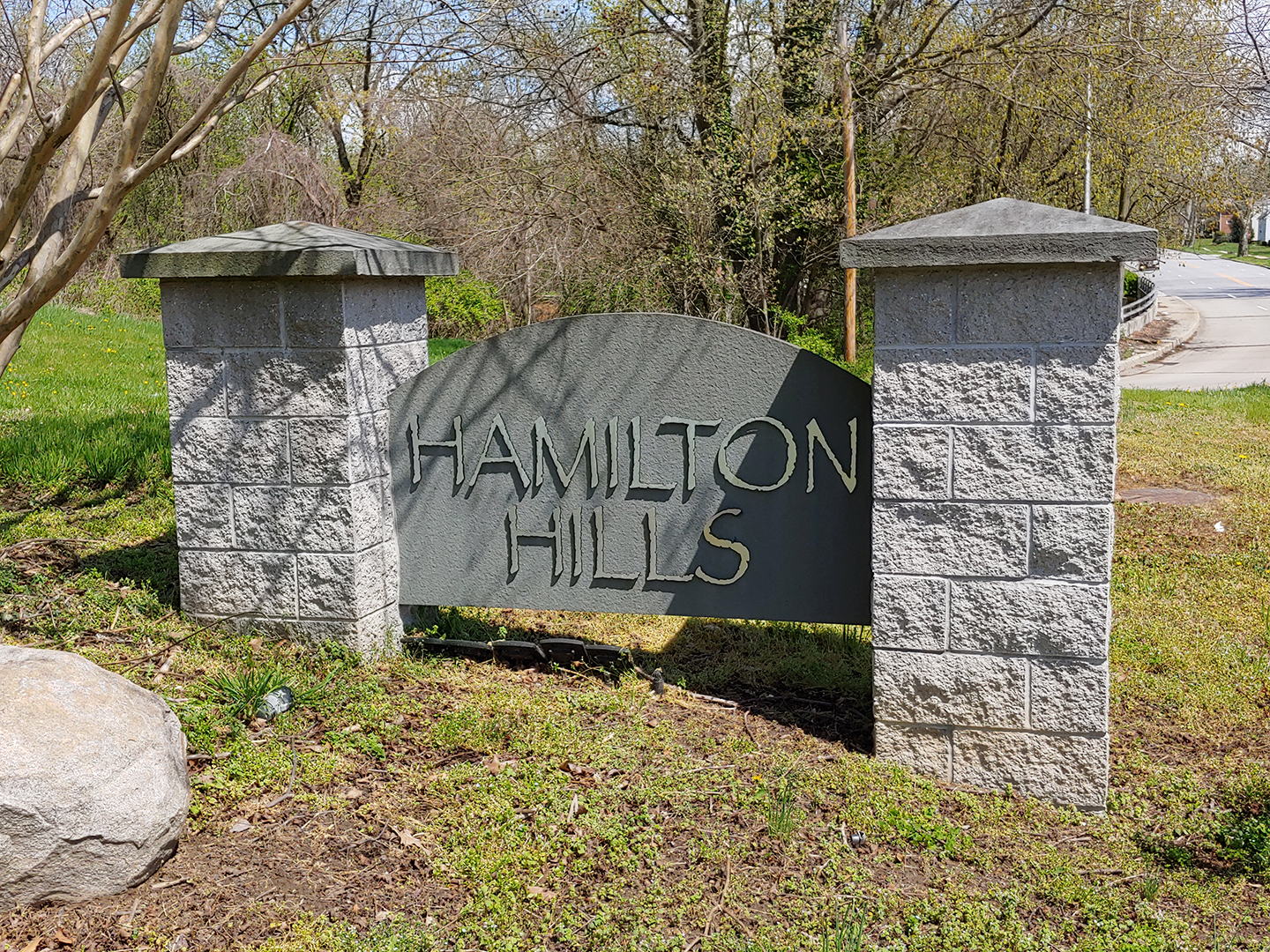
- Sign for Baltimore's Hamilton Hills neighborhood that says "Hamilton Hills" (2021)

- Location within Baltimore Location within Maryland Location within the United States
- Coordinates: 39.3518°N 76.5609°W
- Country: United States
- State: Maryland
- City: Baltimore
- City Council: District 3
- Named for: Captain Hamilton Caughey

Area
  - Total: 1.14 sq mi (3.0 km^{2})
- Elevation: 249–364 ft (76–111 m)

Population
  - Estimate (2020): 9,649
  - Density: 8,464/sq mi (3,268/km^{2})

Race and Ethnicity
  - Black: 72.2% (2020)
  - White: 19.8%
  - Some other race: 3.4%
  - Two or more races: 4.2%
  - Hispanic or Latino (any race): 3.5%

Economics
  - Median income: $57,100 (2019)
- Time zone: UTC−5 (Eastern)
  - Summer (DST): UTC−4 (EDT)
- ZIP Codes: 21214, 21234, 21239
- Area Codes: 410, 443, 667

Hamilton Hills is a mixed-use suburban neighborhood located in the northeastern corner of Baltimore, Maryland. Hamilton Hills represents a section of Hamilton, a larger historic area that includes other neighborhoods in Northeast Baltimore. The neighborhood's borders are Old Harford Road and Harford Road to the east, Echodale Avenue to the south, Perring Parkway to the west and the Baltimore County line to the north. The main thoroughfare in Hamilton Hills is Harford Road, which has been an integral part of the area's history.

The larger Hamilton area was sparsely populated until the late 18th century, the period when Harford Road was built. Hamilton began as a small, rural village surrounded by farmland during the 19th century. The land that became Hamilton Hills was a part of Baltimore County until 1918, when Baltimore City annexed it. Real estate developers arrived in the 20th century to build houses, and entrepreneurs formed a main street corridor on Harford Road. The Hamilton area was described throughout the 20th century as a desirable, family-oriented suburb in Baltimore City. The community has experienced White flight and been challenged by urban decay since the end of World War II. Residents in the 21st century have attempted to revive and protect Harford Road's main street economy as well as the reputation of the Hamilton area. Hamilton Hills was formalized in 2003 when the neighborhood association renamed the neighborhood.

Hamilton Hills' population in the 21st century has remained relatively stable compared to Baltimore's overall population decline. As of 2020, Hamilton Hills was the 5th largest neighborhood in the city by total population. Compared to Baltimore as a whole, median household incomes among Hamilton Hills residents in the 2010s were higher, life expectancy was longer, crime was lower, and voter participation was higher. Hamilton Hills residents have been more likely to graduate high school than all Baltimoreans but less likely to complete college.

Hamilton Hills is represented within the Baltimore City Council's 3rd District. Elementary and middle school students are zoned into three public schools, and the neighborhood is served by three post offices and a public library branch. It has two urban green spaces, one park, and a variety of cultural amenities.

== History ==
=== Native American presence and European settlement ===
The Susquehannock people controlled the area that became Baltimore City and Baltimore County as late as the 1640s. They used the hilly, rugged terrain as hunting and trapping grounds, living instead to the north in the lower valley of the Susquehanna River. Beginning in 1634, the Maryland Colony's first English settlers spread north into the Baltimore area from St. Clement's Island in the Potomac River. These settlers gradually drove the Susquehannocks from the land, and they prevented other peoples such as the Iroquois and the Algonquians from claiming it.

The area that became Northeast Baltimore was sparsely populated in the 18th century. In 1734, the Principio Iron Company of England began acquiring land in the area for pig iron production, much of which they exported to England. At the peak of their operations, the company owned 4,900 acres of land in Northeast Baltimore. They used Herring Run to transport some of their goods on barges, and they likely stripped natural resources from the area that became Hamilton.

In 1780, during the American Revolutionary War, the Maryland General Assembly passed an act to confiscate all British property in the state. This included Principio's land in Northeast Baltimore. Over time, wealthy merchants from Baltimore Town built large estates on some of it, and truck farmers arrived to supply food for the region on other lots. Harford Road was built as early as 1791 in part to provide these merchants and farmers with a trade route into Baltimore Town. After the City of Baltimore was incorporated in 1797, most of the Harford Road area remained in Baltimore County until the 20th century.

=== 19th century ===
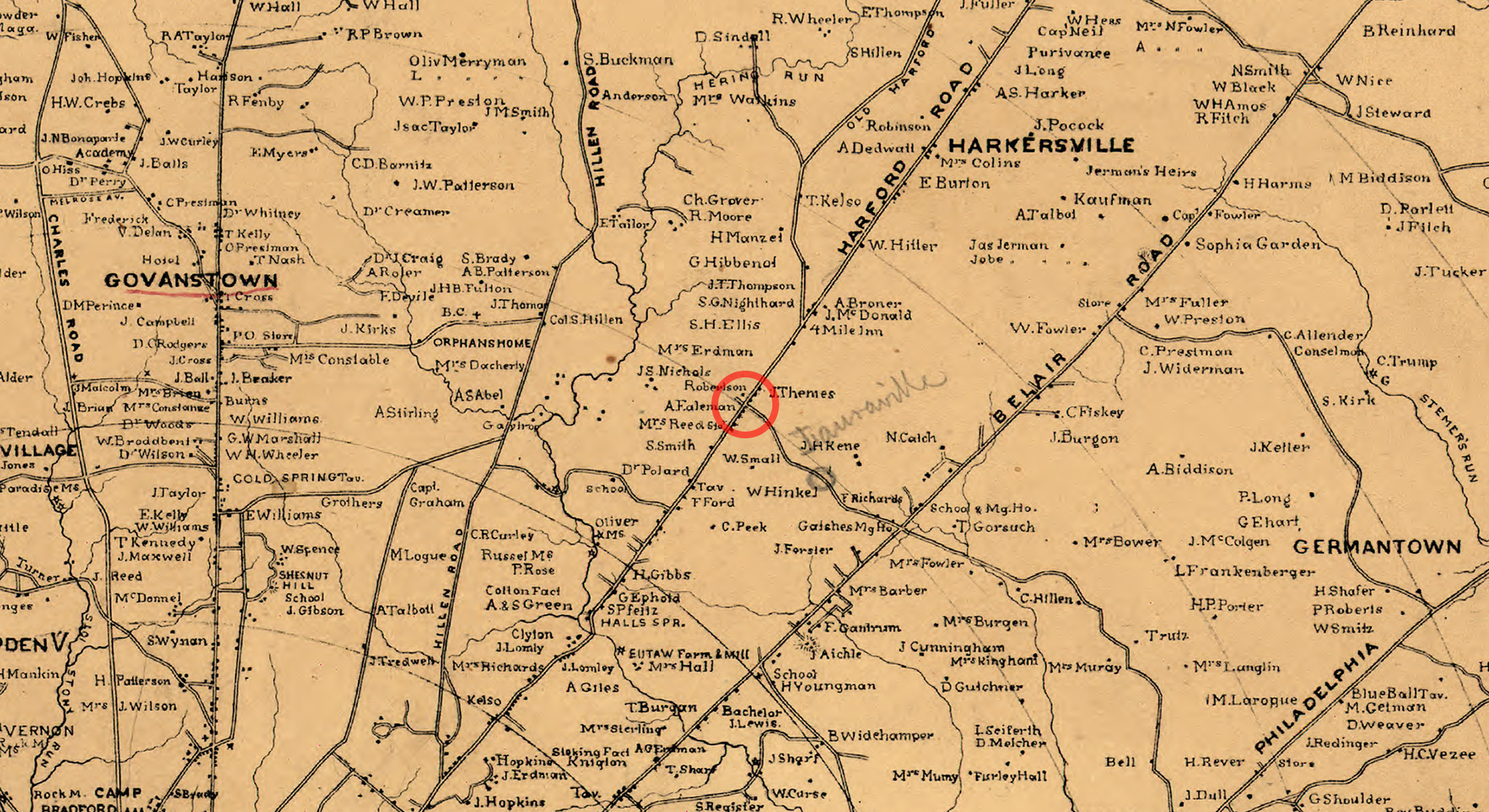
Map with the intersection of Harford Road and Tames Lane (later Hamilton Avenue) emphasized (1863)

Travelers complained in the early 19th century that potholes made Harford Road almost impassable with a horse and carriage. In 1819, the road was privatized as a toll road in exchange for its maintenance. A few connecting streets were built over the next few decades, and villages flourished around some popular crossroads. One such village became Hamilton's sister neighborhood of Lauraville.

During the mid and late 19th century, another village emerged on Harford Road between the intersections of Old Harford Road and Tames Lane. This is the village that later became Hamilton, though it was called North Lauraville in its earliest years. By the late 19th century, travelers in the region recognized North Lauraville as a rest stop and a center for horse and carriage supplies. Tames Lane ran from Harford Road to Belair Road where Hamilton Avenue is today. It was named for the Tames brothers, who opened the village's first general store at the intersection with Harford Road. Other businesses supporting the horse and carriage market as well as local farmers were opened along Harford Road and Tames Lane.

In the late 19th century, a retired sea captain named Hamilton Caughey donated land for Baltimore County to extend Tames Lane west of Harford Road. In exchange, Tames Lane was renamed Hamilton Lane and later Hamilton Avenue in his honor. When the United States Postal Service established a new post office at the intersection of Harford Road and Hamilton Lane, Baltimore Postmaster S. Davies Warfield renamed North Lauraville "Hamilton" to distinguish the village as a separate community.

In 1898, electric rail service for passengers was extended north on Harford Road from downtown Baltimore and into Hamilton. The streetcar system allowed Hamilton residents to travel farther from home and to work in the city. As a result, suburban development in the area would explode over the next few decades.

=== 20th century ===
==== From village to neighborhood ====
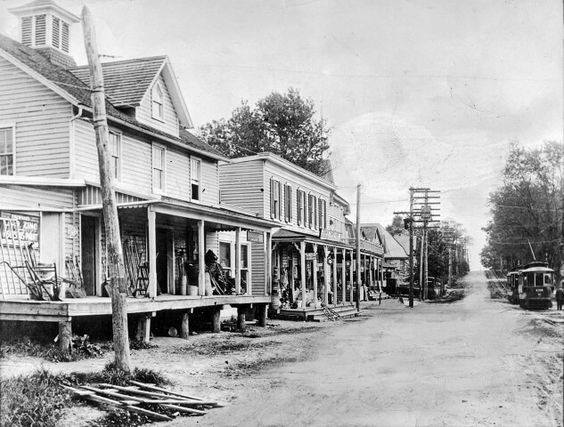
Southbound view from what is today 5535 Harford Road (1910)

After 1900, real estate developers bought many of Hamilton's old estates and farms to subdivide for new housing. In 1905, Evergreen Lawn became Hamilton's first subdivision on Evergreen Avenue. Between 1900 and 1919, a total of ten subdivisions were built in Hamilton and marketed toward middle-class families. Many of the area's present-day streets were named for its earliest residents or for historic properties.

As more residents moved to Hamilton during the early 20th century, they expanded the area's economic and communal activities. Retailers in various trades, from drug stores to dressmaking, opened along Harford Road and Hamilton Avenue. The two-story Hamilton Hall building was constructed at the southeast corner of Harford Road and Hamilton Avenue to serve as a prominent gathering place. Between 1900 and 1930, a dozen Christian churches were founded on or near Harford Road, and six held their first meetings in Hamilton Hall. Two neighborhood associations, the Hamilton Improvement Association and the Hamilton Women's Club, were formed to advocate for social and structural improvements in the area.

In 1918, Baltimore City annexed land including Hamilton and what is today Northeast Baltimore from Baltimore County. The city granted substantial property tax breaks for residents and developers in its newly annexed communities. The city also extended its water, sewer, and other infrastructure systems to Hamilton in the years following annexation.

After annexation, Baltimore City began connecting its eastern and western halves with several lateral roads. Northern Parkway was the first; it was begun in 1926 and completed in the 1970s. Echodale Avenue was built in 1935. By the mid-1920s, Harford Road had also evolved from a dusty toll road to a public arterial road. These roads allowed Hamilton's residents to access the rest of the city more easily and vice versa.

==== Mid to late 20th century ====
Southbound view of Harford Road at White Avenue showing streetcars and automobiles (1956)

Hamilton was described throughout the 20th century as a desirable, family-oriented suburb and was known for its main street corridor on Harford Road. After another housing boom following World War II, most of the space available for residential stock had been developed. The last major housing push in Hamilton was the construction of apartment complexes near Northern Parkway and Perring Parkway, which occurred during the late 1960s and 1970s.

From the 1940s to the 1950s, Baltimore's city planners discontinued the electric streetcar system in favor of gasoline-powered automobiles. General Motors, Standard Oil, and Firestone Tire influenced the conversion of the city's streetcars to buses, and Hamilton's rail service on Harford Road was discontinued on June 19, 1956. The conversion of Harford Road exclusively to automobiles impacted Hamilton's main street economy. Over time, retailers relocated elsewhere to accommodate shoppers at strip malls and later at shopping malls.

Hamilton's characteristics changed during the latter half of the 20th century. The area became more of a pass-through community than a destination as its main street economy declined. White residents began migrating away from Baltimore and from Hamilton as suburban communities emerged in surrounding counties. Following the racial desegregation of Baltimore's public schools in the 1950s and 1960s, the majority of public school students in the city and in the Hamilton area shifted from White to Black. Generally speaking, Hamilton evolved into a more mixed-race area after Baltimore's population peaked in the 1950s.

=== 21st century ===
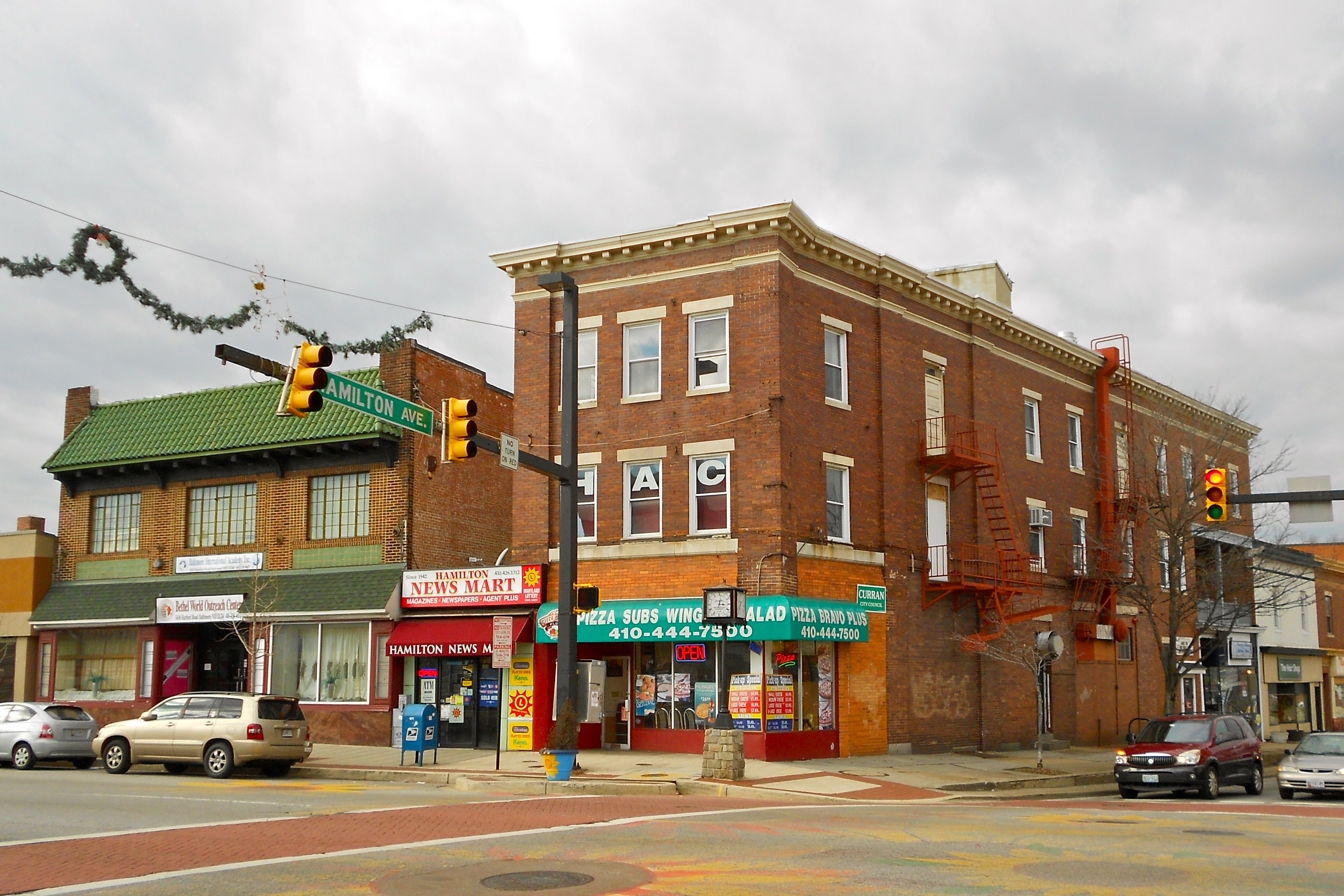
The southwest corner of Harford Road and Hamilton Avenue (2013)

To combat urban decay in the Hamilton-Lauraville area, local advocates targeted the Harford Road corridor for revitalization during the 1990s and 2000s. Hamilton-Lauraville Main Street, a 501(c)(3) nonprofit organization, was founded with the support of the Baltimore Main Streets program. The organization's mission is to provide "quality of life experiences that retain residents and attract new neighbors, and to create opportunities for local businesses". Hamilton Lauraville Main Street has since hosted cultural events in the neighborhood and provided grants to businesses for improvements.

In 2000, the neighborhood association representing what became Hamilton Hills named the neighborhood Harford Echodale Perring Parkway (HEPP). In 2003, the association renamed the neighborhood Hamilton Hills, the name by which it is known today.

Hamilton, and Hamilton Hills by association, has been awarded in recent years for its desirability. In 2014, The Baltimore Sun ranked Hamilton 3rd in its top ten up-and-coming places to live in the Baltimore region. In 2019, the real estate website Redfin ranked Hamilton 4th in its top ten hottest affordable neighborhoods in the United States.

== Geography ==
Hamilton Hills' borders have changed over time and, like many urban neighborhoods, have not always been clearly defined. The current borders are Old Harford Road and Harford Road to the east, Echodale Avenue to the south, Perring Parkway to the west and the Baltimore County line to the north. Some city agencies and local research organizations continue to include Hamilton Hills in their data for Harford-Echodale-Perring-Parkway (HEPP), a neighborhood cluster that includes Hamilton Hills and the neighborhoods of North Harford Road, Overlea, Taylor Heights, and the section of Westfield west of Harford Road.

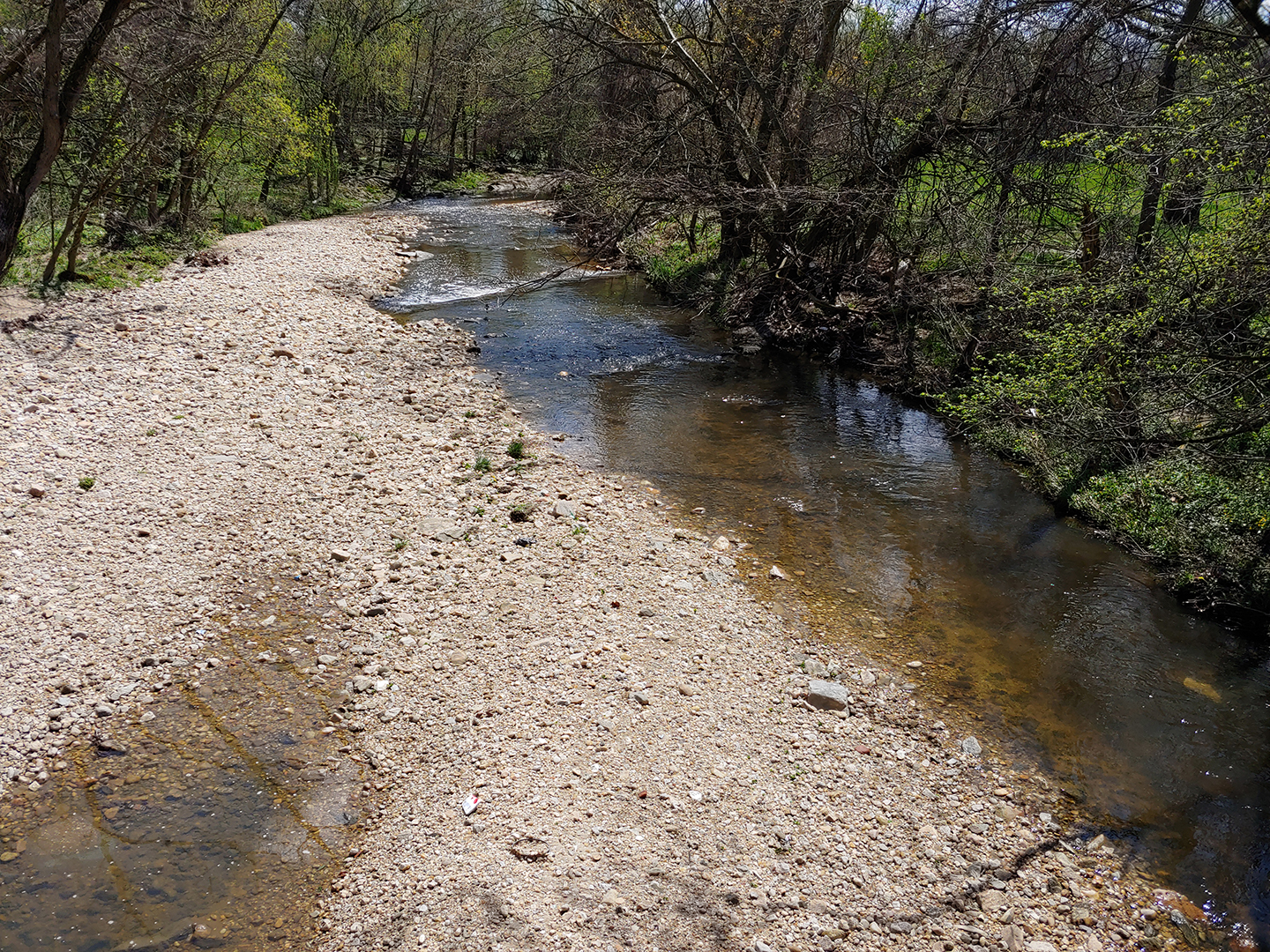
Herring Run as seen facing south from Woodbourne Avenue (2021)

The terrain in Hamilton Hills includes gently rolling hills that are characteristic of the Piedmont, a plateau region of the Eastern United States. Hamilton Hills' elevation ranges from 250 feet (76 meters) above sea level at Herring Run near Echodale Avenue to 365 feet (111 meters) near the intersection of Old Harford Road and Moore Avenue. Soils in the neighborhood are generally clay-like and moderately fertile.

Hamilton Hills has a total area of 1.14 mi^{2} (3.0 km^{2}). Data published in 2020 showed that it was the 8th largest of Baltimore's neighborhoods by total area. Most of Hamilton Hills is land, though a thin section of Herring Run, which flows just outside of the neighborhood's western border, passes through the southwest corner. As of 2017, the total land area in HEPP covered by tree canopy was 29.6%, ranking 19th out of 55 neighborhood clusters in Baltimore.

Neighborhoods that are adjacent to Hamilton Hills include the community formerly known as Glenham-Belhar, Lauraville, Loch Raven, North Harford Road, Waltherson, and Westfield. Parkville is another community north of Hamilton Hills across the Baltimore County line. The campus of Morgan State University, which lies southwest of the neighborhood, can also be seen from some of the neighborhood's hills.

== Demographics ==
According to data from the United States Census, Hamilton Hills' population has remained relatively steady in the 21st century. In 2000, Hamilton Hills (then known as HEPP) had an estimated 9,679 residents. By 2020, Hamilton Hills had an estimated 9,649 residents. Data published in 2020 showed that Hamilton was the 5th largest of Baltimore's neighborhoods by total population.

Many of Hamilton Hills' White residents have moved out of the neighborhood during the 21st century, and Black residents have mostly replaced them. In 2000, about 58.5% (5,662) of residents were Black or African American alone, 38.0% (3,676) were White alone, 1.0% (95) were Asian alone, and 1.8% (171) were from two or more races. About 1.6% (156) of all residents from all races were of Hispanic or Latino origin. By comparison, about 72.2% (6,962) of residents were Black or African American alone in 2020, 19.8% (1,914) were White alone, 3.4% (332) were some other race alone, and 4.2% (406) were from two or more races. About 3.5% (339) of residents from all races were Hispanic or Latino. Between 2000 and 2020, about 47.9% (1,762) of Hamilton Hills' White residents left the neighborhood. This period of White flight has continued despite the arrivals of White millennials into other areas of Baltimore.

About 55.4% (5,225) of Hamilton Hills residents were female as of 2019 and 44.6% (4,199) were male. The estimated median age of Hamilton Hills residents as of 2019 was 35.2 years old (33.8 for females, 40.4 for males). This was similar to the estimated median age of 35.4 years for all Baltimoreans as of the same year. About 6.6% (620) of residents were under 5 years old, which was similar to 6.4% for all Baltimoreans.

The estimated median household income of residents as of 2019 was $57,100. This was higher than the estimated median household income of $50,400 for all of Baltimore. About 19.1% of Hamilton Hills households had received some form of cash assistance or SNAP benefits within the past year compared to 25.0% citywide.

Hamilton Hills had fewer vacant housing units and more homeowners in 2020 than Baltimore as a whole. The neighborhood had an estimated 4,463 housing units as of that year, 6.3% (280) of which were vacant. This was lower than the citywide vacancy percentage of 16.6%. About 56.9% (5,358) of the neighborhood's residents also lived in owner-occupied housing as of 2019, and 43.1% (4,055) were renters. By comparison, about 51.0% of Baltimoreans lived in owner-occupied housing and 49.0% were renters.

== Health ==
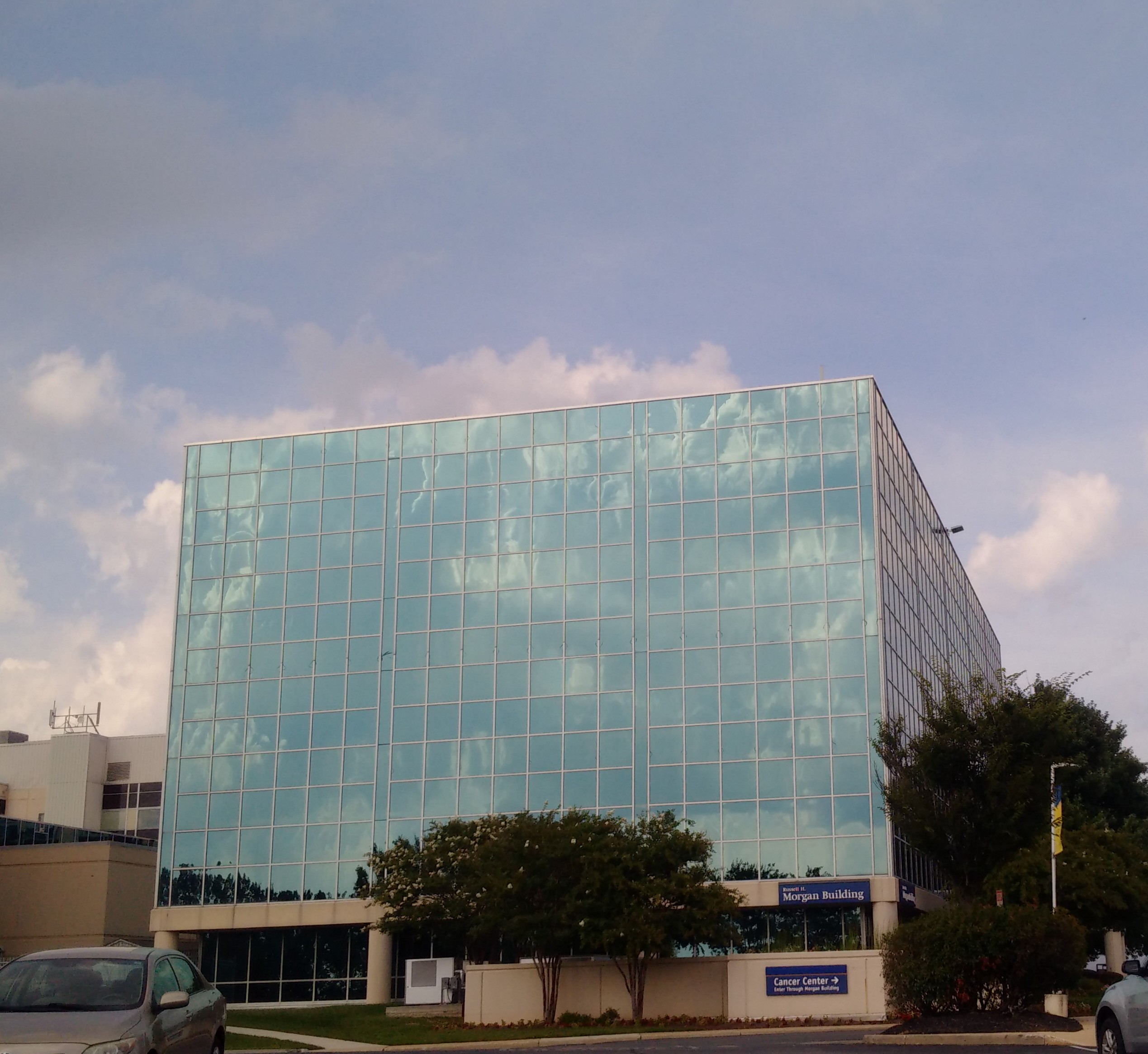
Front entrance of the Morgan Building at MedStar Good Samaritan Hospital in Loch Raven (© by James G. Howes, 2019)

Between 2011 and 2015, the life expectancy of residents born in HEPP was 75.7 years compared to 73.6 years for all Baltimoreans. The leading causes of death in HEPP during that period were heart disease (25.8% of deaths) and cancer (23.5%). HEPP ranked 3rd out of 55 neighborhood clusters in Baltimore for deaths from breast cancer, representing 3.0% of the area's deaths compared to 1.5% for the entire city.

Between 2011 and 2015, the birth rate per 1,000 females in HEPP was lower (13.6) compared to that of all female Baltimoreans (14.3). The teen birth rate per 1,000 females in Hamilton Hills ages 15 to 19 (27.3) was also lower than that of all Baltimoreans from the same group (42.3). The infant mortality rate was also lower in HEPP: about 2.6 out of 1,000 infants born in HEPP died before the first birthdays, compared to 10.6 deaths among all of Baltimore's infants.

Hamilton Hills' nearest hospital is MedStar Good Samaritan Hospital, a private, not-for-profit teaching hospital located at 5601 Loch Raven Boulevard in Loch Raven.

== Crime and safety ==
The Baltimore Police Department serves Hamilton Hills in its Northeastern District. The district's headquarters is located at 1900 Argonne Drive next to the campus of Morgan State University.

In 2019, Hamilton Hills residents reported 284 property crimes and 210 violent crimes for a total of 494 crimes. Between 2014 and 2019, the total annual crimes reported in the neighborhood decreased by 14.5%, from 578 to 494, mostly because of a decrease in reported property crimes. In 2019, there were 30.1 property crimes and 22.3 violent crimes reported for every 1,000 Hamilton Hills residents. These rates were lower than those for Baltimore City as a whole for the same year, which were 42.2 property crimes and 33.8 violent crimes reported for every 1,000 Baltimoreans.

The Fourth Battalion of the Baltimore City Fire Department provides fire protection to Hamilton Hills. Engine Company 56, the closest fire station to most of the neighborhood, is located at 6512 Harford Road in Westfield. Engine Company 42, Medic 6 is located to the south at 4522 Harford Road in Lauraville.

== Culture ==
Art is present throughout the Hamilton-Lauraville area and in Hamilton Hills. The neighborhood features several murals through the support of the Baltimore Mural Program. Many of Hamilton Hills' restaurants also feature live music. In addition, several of Hamilton Hills' establishments foster arts and entertainment, including Chapterhouse Tattoo, the Hamilton Arts Collective, Hamiltone Music, the Mid-Atlantic Center for the Performing Arts, and the Strand Theater.

The Hamilton Lauraville Main Street organization has hosted cultural events for the Hamilton-Lauraville area throughout the 21st century. For example, they have organized First Friday events along Harford Road. In 2010, they began sponsoring the Downhill Derby, an annual soap box derby in Hamilton Hills.

The quality of the restaurants along the Harford Road corridor has been recognized in food media since the late 20th century. In 2019, a dining reporter for The Baltimore Sun described the Hamilton-Lauraville area as "Baltimore's low-key foodie neighborhood". Clementine, a farm-to-table restaurant that closed in 2017, was featured on an episode of the Food Network series Diners, Drive-Ins and Dives.

Excluding apartments, most housing units in Hamilton Hills are single-family detached houses or semi-detached houses with front porches and large yards. Because many houses in Hamilton-Lauraville were built with ample yard space, hundreds of urban gardeners and farmers live in the area.

=== Parks and recreation ===
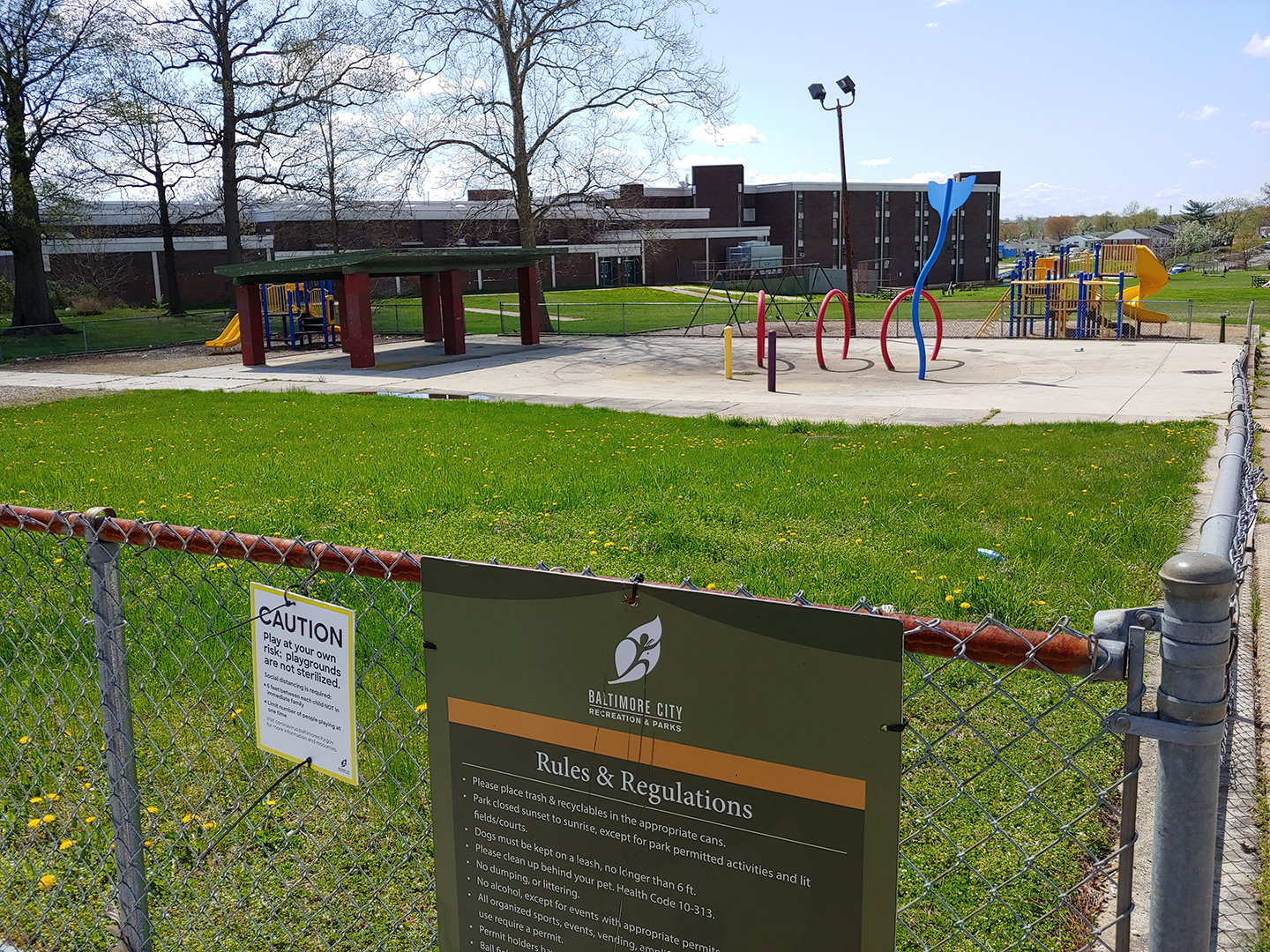
Playground equipment at North Harford Park (2021)

The Baltimore City Department of Recreation and Parks manages the majority of parks and recreational facilities in Baltimore. The agency manages Hamilton Hills' North Harford Park, which provides athletic fields and other recreational facilities at 6800 Hamlet Avenue. Hamilton Hills also has two urban green spaces: HEPP Park, a four-acre (0.02 km^{2}) woodland area located at 2399 Pinewood Avenue; and the section of Herring Run that flows south into Herring Run Park.

=== Political and civic participation ===
Voter registration and voting in general elections have been more frequent in Hamilton Hills compared to all of Baltimore. As of 2018, 85.7% of adults 18 years or older in HEPP were registered to vote. This was higher than the 81.3% of adults who were registered across all of Baltimore. In elections between 2010 and 2018, an average of 49.8% of adults 18 years or older in HEPP voted in general elections. This was also higher than the percentage for all of Baltimore, as an average of 45.1% of the city's adults voted in general elections during the same period.

Hamilton Hills residents have formed several neighborhood associations since the early 1900s. The Hamilton Hills Neighborhood Association, a 501(c)(3) nonprofit organization, is the present-day group of volunteers who organize and advocate for Hamilton Hills' residents.

=== Notable people ===
Notable residents of the Hamilton area have included:

- Munro Leaf (1905–1976), an author and illustrator of children's books. He is best known for creating the character Ferdinand the Bull.
- E. Ruth Hedeman (1910–2006), a solar astronomer. She published research on solar cycles and solar particle events.
- Toots Barger (1913–1998), a national duckpin bowling champion and the second woman to be inducted into the Maryland State Athletic Hall of Fame.
- Sebastian Russo (1924–1981), a primary care physician who was shot and killed in his office on the 5100 block of Harford Road (now part of Lauraville). The wrought iron clock at the southwest corner of Harford Road and Hamilton Avenue was erected in his honor.
- Lou Grasmick (1924–2016), a businessman, philanthropist, and professional baseball pitcher in Major League Baseball (MLB).
- Jack Scarbath (1930–2020), a professional American football quarterback in the National Football League (NFL).
- Matthew Porterfield (1977–), an independent filmmaker. He wrote and directed the 2006 drama film Hamilton, which is set in the Hamilton area.

== Government ==
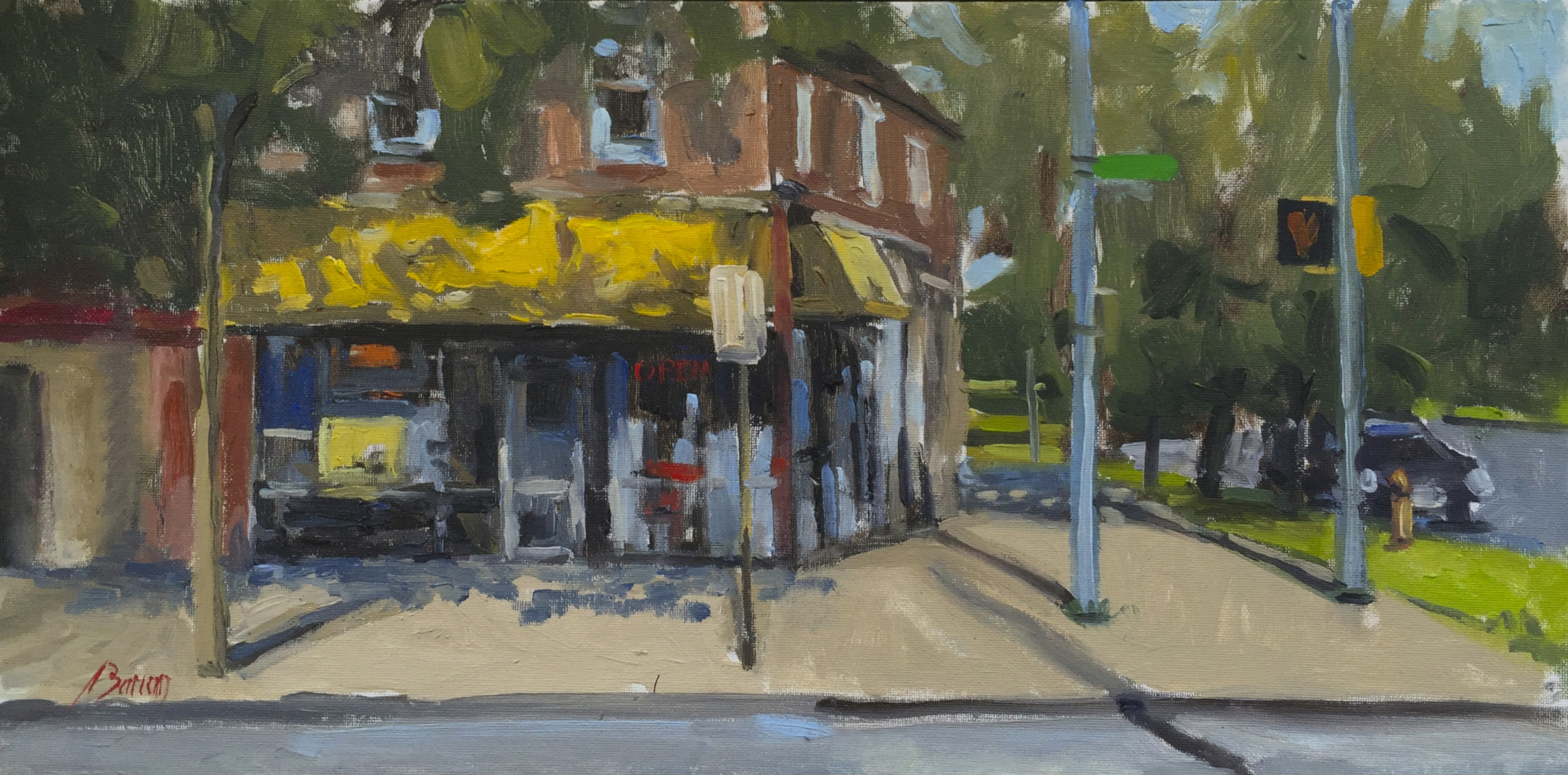
Painting of the southwest corner of Harford Road and Northern Parkway

Baltimore is legislated by its City Council, which has 14 members elected by district and a president elected at-large. Hamilton Hills is represented within the 3rd council district. The neighborhood's current councilperson is Ryan Dorsey, who was elected to his first four-year term in 2016 and re-elected in 2020.

The Maryland General Assembly, which is the state legislature of Maryland, is divided into the Maryland Senate and the Maryland House of Delegates. Hamilton Hills is represented within the 43rd district and the 45th district of the Senate, as well as the 43rd district and the 45th district of the House of Delegates.

In the U.S. House of Representatives, Hamilton Hills is represented north of Northern Parkway within Maryland's 3rd congressional district and south of Northern Parkway within Maryland's 7th congressional district. John Sarbanes has represented the 3rd district since 2007. Kweisi Mfume previously represented the 7th district from 1987 to 1996. He was re-elected in May 2020 following the death of Elijah Cummings in October 2019.

== Education ==
As of 2019, Hamilton Hills had a higher percentage of high school graduates than Baltimore as a whole but lower percentages of college graduates. About 90.5% (6,285) of Hamilton Hills' adults 25 years of age or older had at least a high school diploma or equivalent compared to 85.2% for the entire city. College completion rates were lower among Hamilton Hills residents. About 5.9% (407) of adults 25 years of age or older had associate degrees as of 2019, 15.4% (1,069) had bachelor's degrees, and 12.5% (870) had graduate or professional degrees. This was in comparison to all of Baltimore City, in which an estimated 4.8% of adults 25 years of age or older had associate degrees, 16.8% had bachelor's degrees, and 15.1% had graduate or professional degrees.

=== Schools ===
Baltimore offers students in pre-kindergarten, middle school, and high school the choice to attend any school in the city. Elementary students generally enroll in the schools zoned by area but can apply to the city's charter schools. In Hamilton Hills, students are zoned by default into three schools from pre-kindergarten through 8th grade. These are operated by Baltimore City Public Schools, the city's public school district.

- Hamilton Elementary/Middle School is located at 6101 Old Harford Road in Hamilton Hills. The school enrolls students in pre-kindergarten through 8th grade. Elementary and middle students south of Northern Parkway attend this school. A total of 865 students were enrolled at this school in 2019. Of these, 78.6% (680) were Black, 7.1% (61) were Hispanic or Latino, and 9.7% (84) were White.
- Woodhome Elementary/Middle School is located at 7300 Moyer Avenue in the North Harford Road neighborhood. The school enrolls students in pre-kindergarten through 8th grade. Elementary and middle school students near Old Harford Road north of Northern Parkway attend this school. A total of 387 students were enrolled at this school in 2019. Of these, 80.4% (311) were Black, 5.7% (22) were Hispanic or Latino, and 10.1% (39) were White.
- Yorkwood Elementary School is located at 5931 Yorkwood Road in Loch Raven. The school enrolls students in pre-kindergarten through 5th grade. Elementary students north of Northern Parkway and near Perring Parkway attend this school. A total of 418 students were enrolled at this school in 2019. Of these, 95.2% (398) were Black and 2.9% (12) were Hispanic or Latino.

Two public high schools are also located in Hamilton Hills.

- Reginald F. Lewis High School is located at 6401 Pioneer Drive. The school enrolls students in grades 9 through 12. Enrollment is subject to a choice lottery, meaning if more students select the school than it can serve, students are selected by lottery. A total of 541 students were enrolled at this school in 2019. Of these, 82.6% (452) were Black, 12.8% (69) were Hispanic or Latino, and 1.8% (10) were White.
- Success Academy is an alternative placement high school located at 2201 Pinewood Avenue. The school enrolls students in grades 9 through 12 with special needs.
Public schools zoned for Hamilton Hills students or located in Hamilton Hills
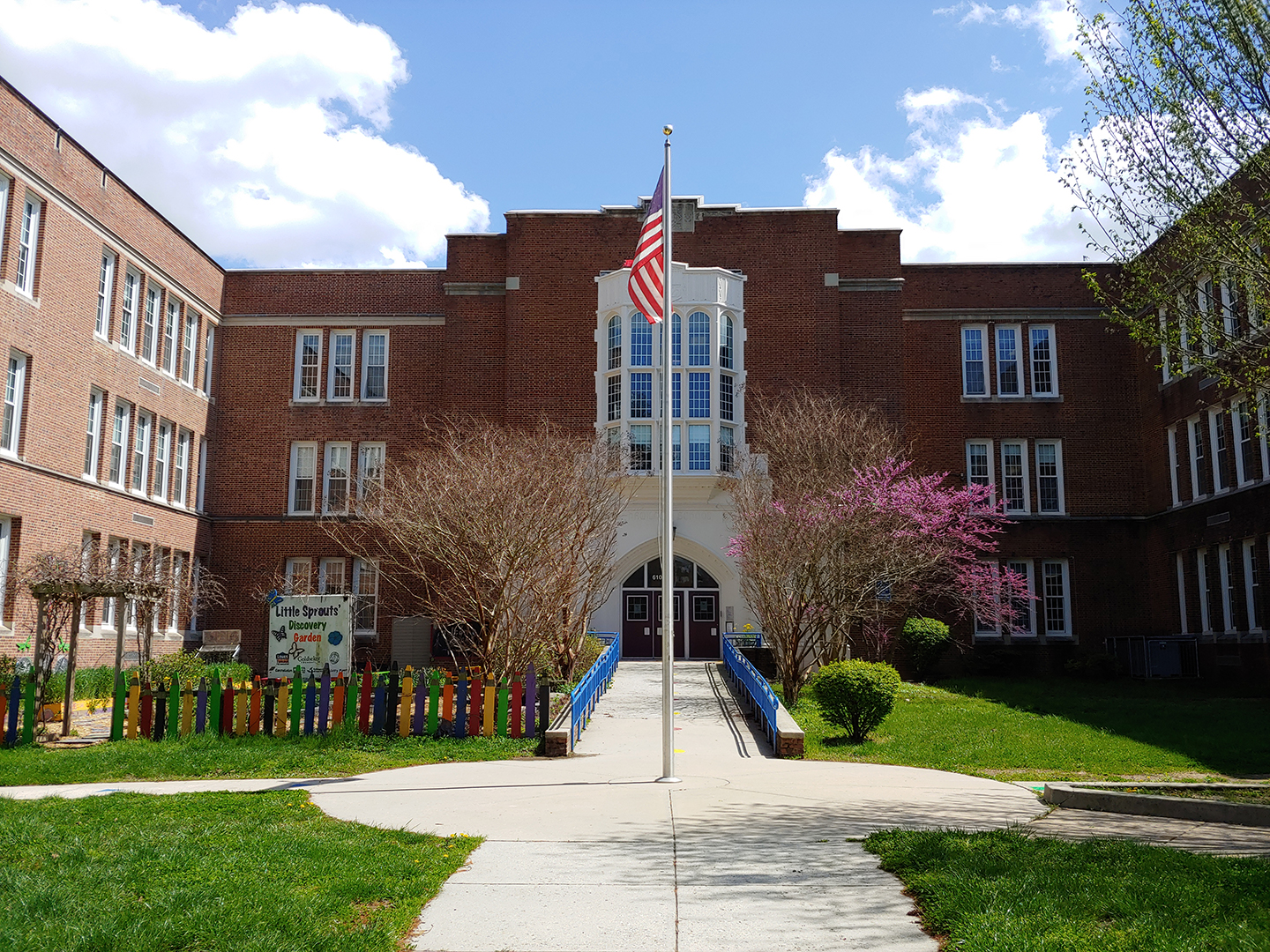
Front entrance of Hamilton Elementary-Middle School in Hamilton Hills (2021)

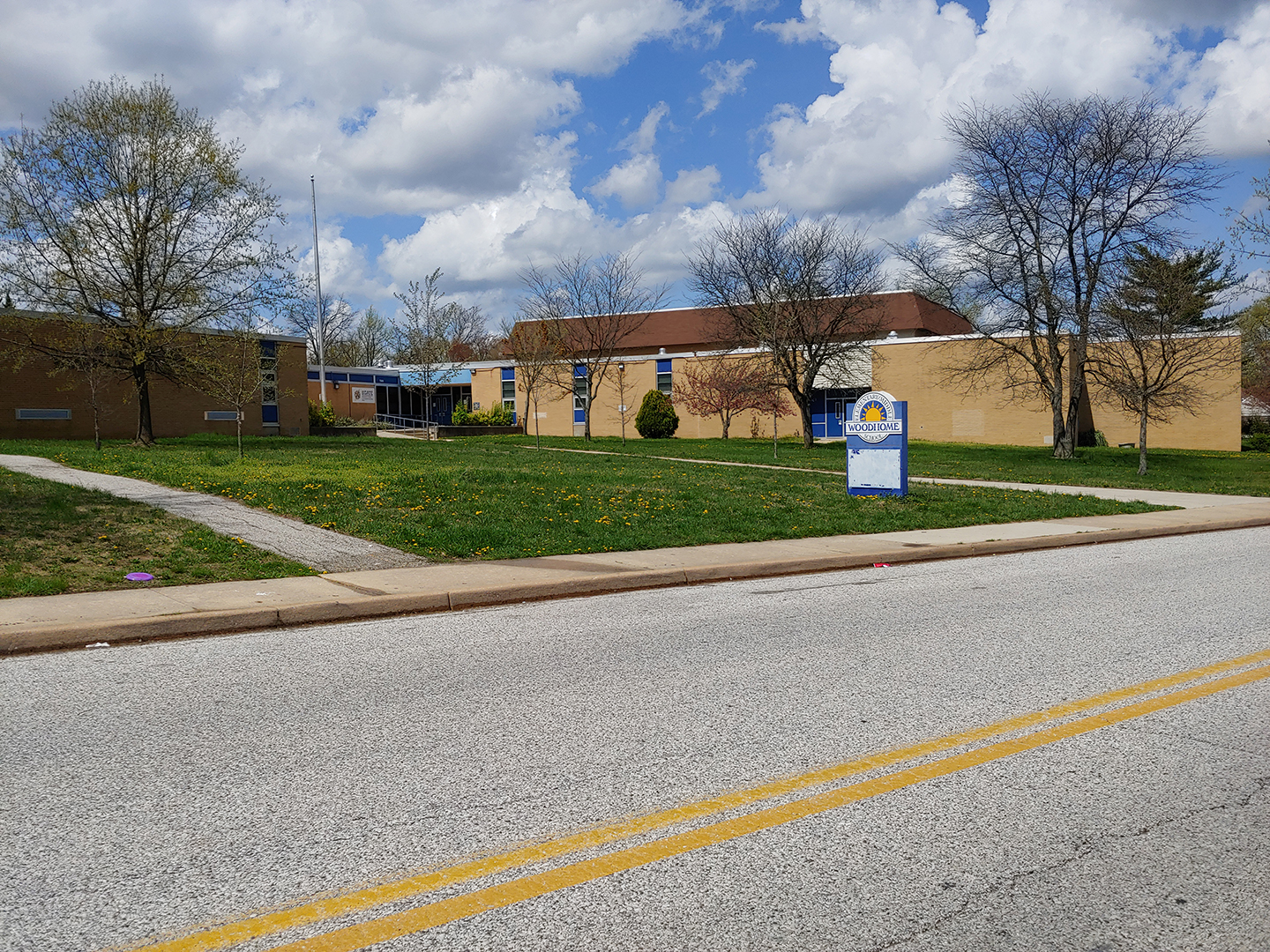
Front entrance of Woodhome Elementary-Middle School in North Harford Road (2021)

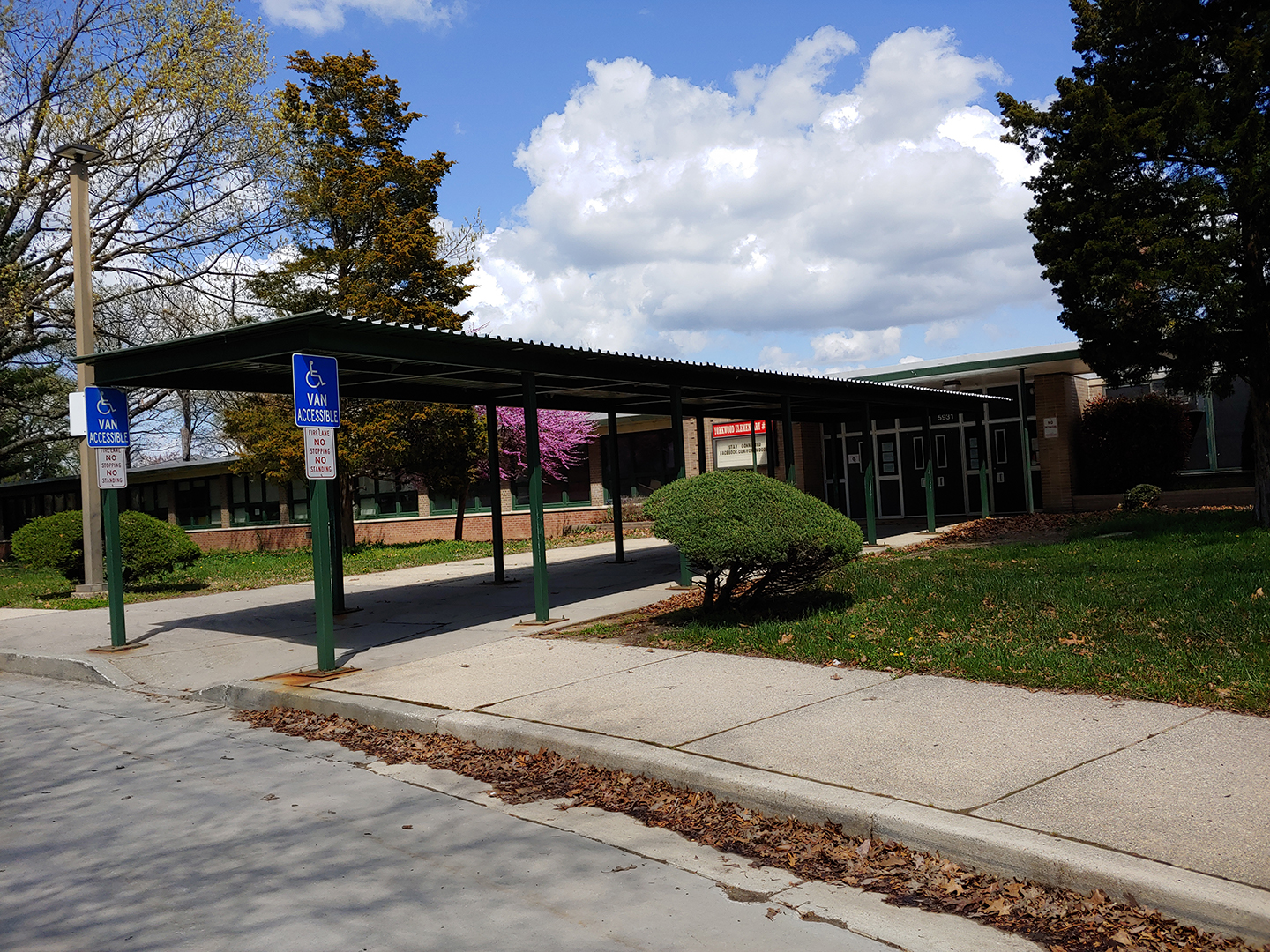
Front entrance of Yorkwood Elementary School in Loch Raven (2021)

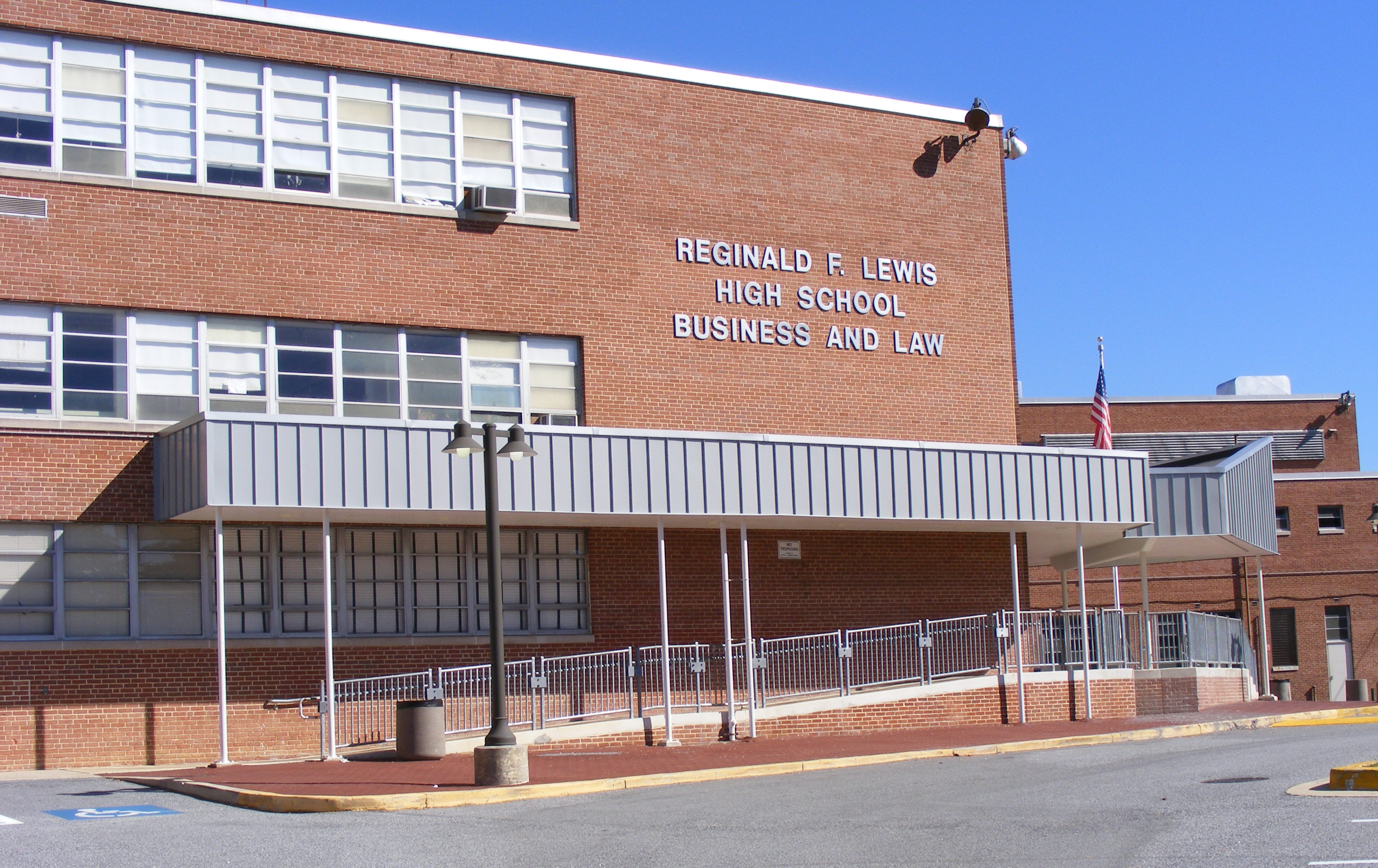
Front entrance of Reginald F. Lewis High School in Hamilton Hills (2007)

=== Library ===
The Enoch Pratt Free Library system operates the Hamilton Branch Library at 5910 Harford Road. The Hamilton area was previously served by the Old Hamilton Library, which opened at Hamilton and Richard Avenues in December 1920. After a housing boom following World War II, the larger Hamilton Branch building was constructed and opened in January 1959.

In 2018, about 19.3% of HEPP residents had library cards, ranking 49th out of 55 neighborhood clusters in Baltimore. This was lower than the estimated average of 27.8% across Baltimore's neighborhoods for the same year.

== Postal service ==
The United States Postal Service (USPS) uses three ZIP Codes in Hamilton Hills: 21214, 21234, and 21239. They operate three post offices that serve the neighborhood:

- The Hamilton Post Office is located at 4901 Harford Road. They deliver mail within the 21214 ZIP Code, which covers most of Hamilton Hills, and the 21239 ZIP Code, which covers the Barclay Square Apartments complex near Herring Run.
- The Northwood Post Office is located at 1800 E Northern Parkway in Loch Raven. They deliver mail within the 21214 and 21234 ZIP Codes, including blocks in the north and west sections of the neighborhood.
- The Parkville Post Office is located at 8201 Harford Road in Parkville. They deliver mail within the 21234 ZIP Code, including some blocks north of Northern Parkway and near Old Harford Road.

== Infrastructure ==
=== Transportation ===
==== Hamilton Business District Streetscape ====
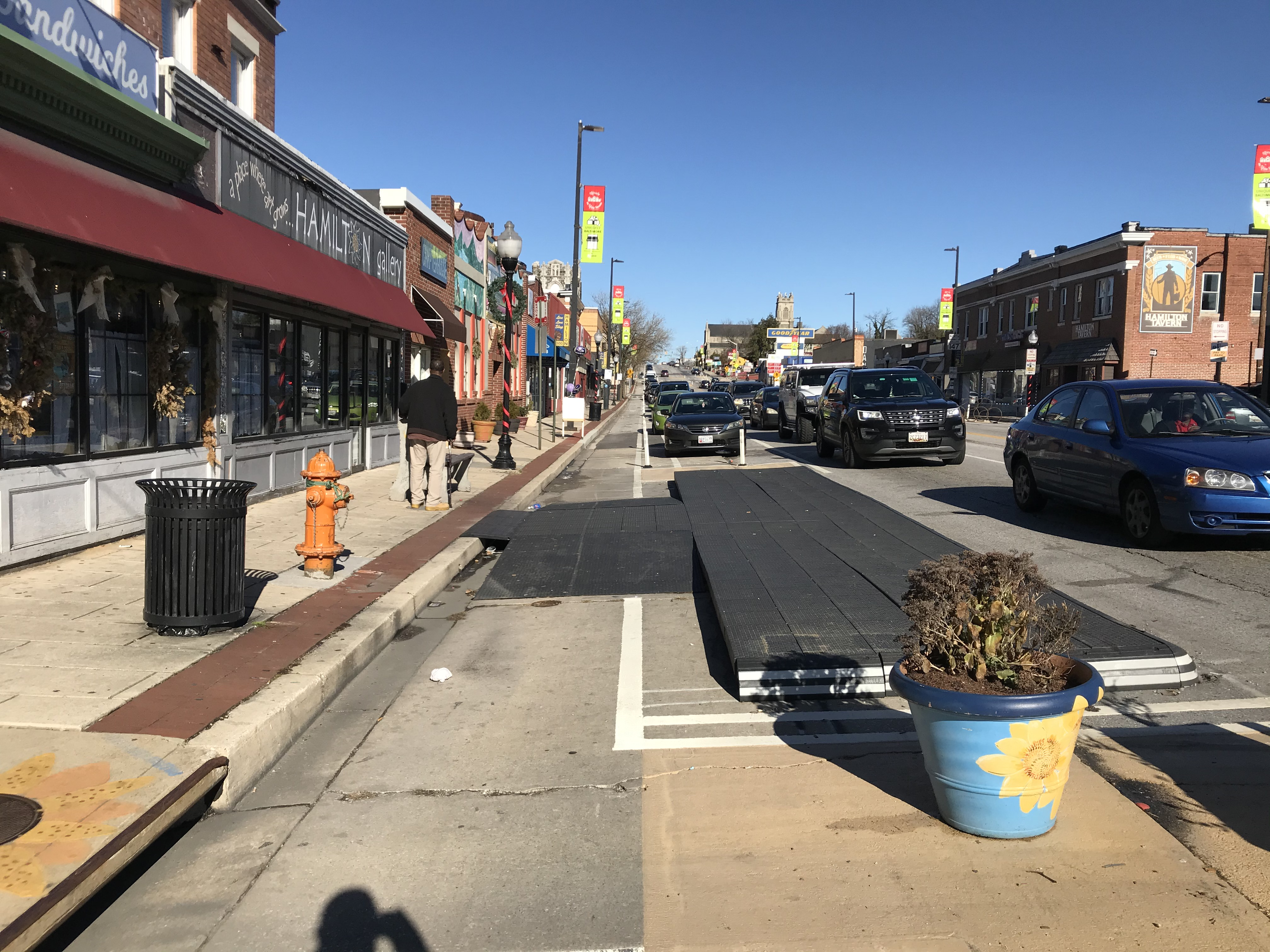
Floating bus stop and separated bike lane on the southbound side of Harford Road at Hamilton Avenue (2020)

In 2019, the Baltimore City Department of Transportation installed separated bike lanes, floating bus stops, and more main street parking along Harford Road between White Avenue and Echodale Avenue. The changes were part of a $400,000 Hamilton Business District Streetscape project that reduced the number of traffic lanes for cars from four to three. They also represented Baltimore's testing of the Complete Streets urban design model, the placement of Harford Road on a "road diet", and an expansion of the city's cycling infrastructure.

==== Bus and rail ====
The Maryland Transit Authority's public bus service operates LocalLink Routes 30, 33, 36, and 54, and ExpressLink Route 154 through Hamilton Hills. These routes travel east and west along Northern Parkway and northeast to southwest along Harford Road. The agency also operates its MobilityLink service in the neighborhood, providing paratransit for riders who are unable to use Baltimore's buses or trains.

Rail service for passengers has not been present in Hamilton Hills since June 16, 1956, when Harford Road's electric rail service was converted to bus service. As of October 2020, the MTA had no plans to include Hamilton in their future rail services. The Green Line, which the MTA proposed in 2002 as part of a broader Baltimore Region Rail System Plan, would have included a stop in Hamilton Hills.

==== Roads and highways ====
Harford Road, or Maryland Route 147, has been an integral part of the neighborhood's history. It is a state highway that runs 18.8 miles (30.3 km) from North Avenue in Baltimore to Bel Air, the county seat of Harford County. The section of Harford Road that runs through Hamilton Hills forms part of the neighborhood's eastern border and is 0.5 miles (0.80 km) long. In January 2019, the Baltimore City Department of Transportation counted that about 700 motor vehicles passed southbound between White Avenue and Echodale Avenue during the peak AM hour, and about 600 motor vehicles passed northbound during the peak PM hour. Harford Road also connects drivers to Interstate 695 via a junction in Parkville.

Perring Parkway, or Maryland Route 41, is another state highway that runs through Hamilton Hills. It runs 6.8 miles (10.9 km) and begins at Harford Road in the Coldstream-Homestead-Montebello neighborhood as Hillen Road. It then continues north to Waltham Woods Road in Carney. The section of Perring Parkway that runs through Hamilton Hills forms the neighborhood's western border and is 1.3 miles (2.1 km) long. Perring Parkway is another road that connects drivers to Interstate 695 via its junction in Carney.

A few other major roads run through Hamilton Hills. Old Harford Road, which forms the other part of the neighborhood's eastern border, connects residents to Hamilton Elementary/Middle School, the Hamilton Branch of the Enoch Pratt Library, and some of the neighborhood's churches. Northern Parkway runs east to west across the city, connecting Liberty Heights Avenue in Northwest Baltimore to Belair Road in Overlea. Echodale Avenue, which forms the neighborhood's southern border, is part of a route that connects York Road to Belair Road. Hamilton Avenue, the road for which the Hamilton area was named, connects Harford Road to Belair Road north of Echodale Avenue.

=== Utilities ===
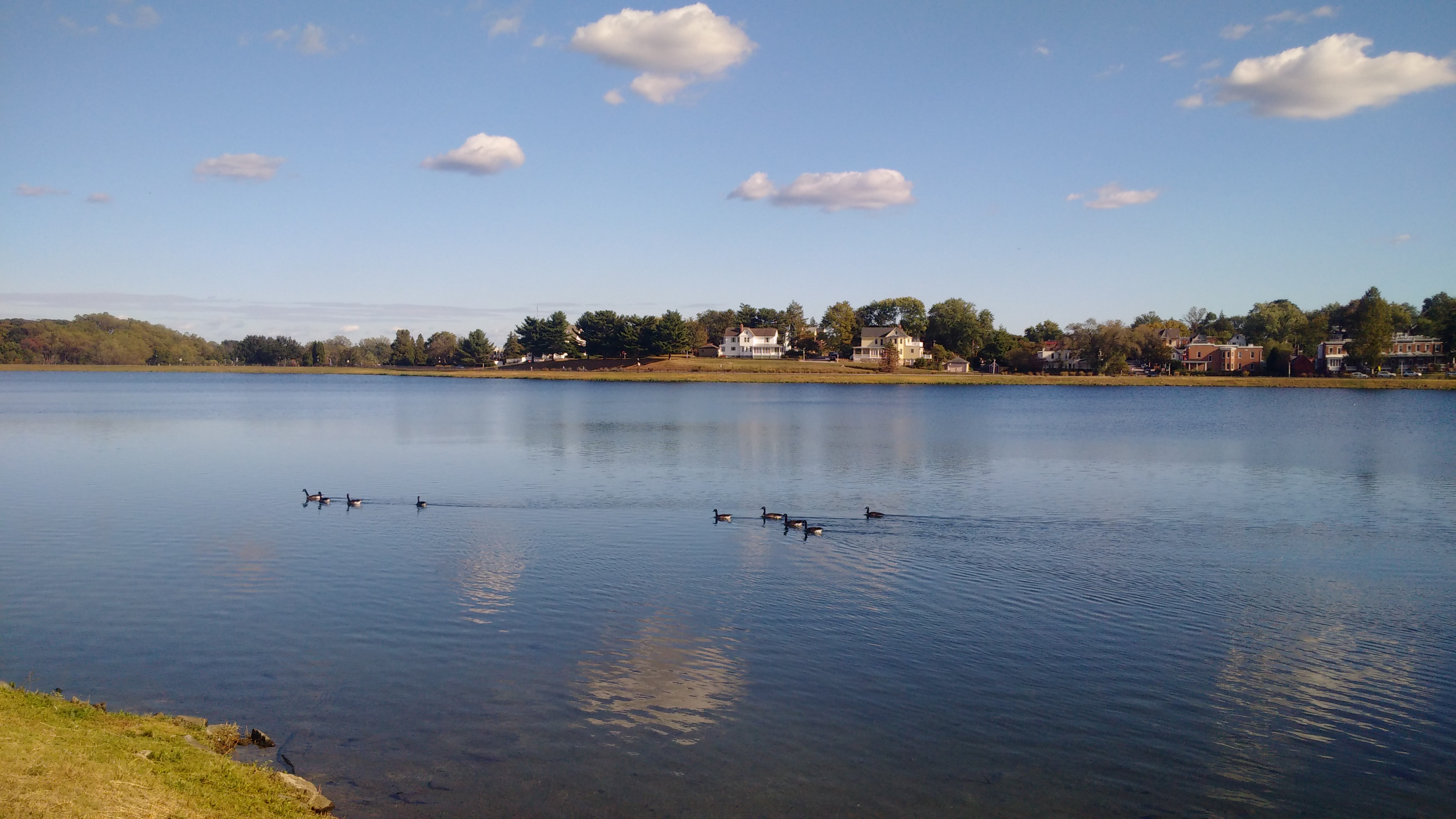
Lake Montebello reservoir (© by James G. Howes, 2019)

Electric power and natural gas are provided to Hamilton Hills by Baltimore Gas and Electric (BGE), a public utility company that serves the Baltimore metropolitan area and all of Baltimore.

Water and sewer services are provided by the Baltimore City Department of Public Works (DPW). Hamilton Hills receives water as a part of the DPW's Eastern Third Zone. The DPW pumps water from several sources to the neighborhood via its Ashburton and Lake Montebello filtration plants.

The DPW provides curbside collection of garbage, recycling, and yard waste in Hamilton Hills. The agency also fulfills a variety of neighborhood cleaning and greening requests through Baltimore's 3-1-1 municipal service system.

== Bibliography ==
- Holcomb, Eric (2005). The City As Suburb: A History of Northeast Baltimore Since 1660. Santa Fe, New Mexico: Center for American Places.
