= Tara Heiss =

American basketball player

Barbara Kennedy
Personal information
- Born: December 2, 1956 San Diego, California, U.S.
- Died: July 7, 2023 (aged 66)

Career information
- College: Maryland (1975–1978)

Career history
- 1980: New Jersey Gems

Career highlights
- ACC tournament MVP (1978)
- Stats at Basketball Reference
- Women's Basketball Hall of Fame
Medals
Women's basketball
Representing the United States
FIBA World Championship
Gold medal – first place	1979 Seoul	National team

Tara Heiss (December 2, 1956 – July 7, 2023) was an American women's basketball player. A 5-foot-6-inch (1.68 m) point guard who played college basketball for the Maryland Terrapins from 1975 to 1978, she also was a member of the 1980 US Olympic team and played in the Women's Professional Basketball League. She was inducted into the Women's Basketball Hall of Fame, the University of Maryland Athletics Hall of Fame, and the Maryland State Athletic Hall of Fame. Many consider her the best point guard in the history of US women's basketball.

Heiss began playing basketball in the ninth grade and played for Walter Johnson High School in Bethesda, Maryland.

At the University of Maryland, she was the first women's basketball player to score 1000 points. Coach Chris Weller said "She's probably one of the best players I've ever seen, among all players and all programs" Maryland won the first ACC tournament in 1978 and Heiss was named Most Valuable Player. In the 1978 AIAW National Large College Basketball Championship, Maryland were contenders for the championship after upsetting favorite Wayland Baptist 90-85 in the final four. During that game Heiss scored 21 points. Wilt Chamberlin watched the game and praised her performance: "That little guard for Maryland (Tara Heiss) was up and down the floor all night long. She never stopped." Maryland lost the championship to UCLA, 90-74.

After nearly making the 1976 US Olympic team, she played on the US national team in 1979 and the team won gold at the 1979 FIBA World Championship for Women. She postponed professional play after college to maintain amateur status and became a member of the 1980 US Olympic women's basketball team. However, due to the United States boycott of the 1980 Olympics in Moscow, American athletes like Heiss were unable to complete.

Heiss played for the Allentown Crestettes in the Amateur Athletic Union and the New Jersey Gems in the short-lived Women's Professional Basketball League (WBL). In the WBL, she averaged 15.5 points in 29 games for the Gems.

Following her playing career, she was an assistant coach at Maryland and Towson University and worked for twenty years for FedEx.

Heiss was inducted into the Women's Basketball Hall of Fame in 2003, the University of Maryland Athletics Hall of Fame in 1998, and the Maryland State Athletic Hall of Fame in 2011.

Heiss died on July 7, 2023, at the age of 66.
