= Waltherson, Baltimore =

Neighborhood in Baltimore, Maryland

Coordinates: 39°20′37″N 76°33′22″W

Waltherson is a neighborhood located in Northeast Baltimore, Maryland, United States that runs between Harford Road to Belair Road and from Hamilton Ave in the north and Southern Ave in the south. It was later expanded to include the neighborhood of Wilson Heights extending its boundaries along Belair Road to Moravia Road to achieve the boundaries currently seen on Baltimore City's CityView page.

Those living along the Harford Road side of the neighborhood will often refer to the area as part of the more well known names of Hamilton, Baltimore based on the business district that historically extended along Waltherson's western boundary. More recently the older name of Lauraville, Baltimore has been used due to their participation in and as a result of the branding and marketing efforts of the now defunct Neighborhoods of Greater Lauraville, Healthy Neighborhoods, and later Hamilton-Lauraville Mainstreet. Healthy Neighborhoods refers to homes in Waltherson as part of Greater Lauraville on their website.

The eastern parts of Waltherson along Belair Road (and the adjacent Frankford, Baltimore) are often called Gardenville, a historic name for that area. The name Gardenville can still be seen in the names of the shopping center at Frankford Ave and Belair Road, the Gardenville Belair Road Business Association, and the adjacent Gardenville Elementary School.
