= Toots Barger =

American duckpin bowling champion

- Born: March 30, 1913; Hamilton Hills
- Died: September 28, 1998; Frederick

Elizabeth "Toots" Barger (March 30, 1913 – September 28, 1998) was a Baltimore, Maryland duckpin bowling champion.

She was born Mary Elizabeth Ryan in Hamilton, Maryland and graduated from Eastern High School in 1931. She was dubbed "Tootsie" by her aunt, which she later shortened to the nickname "Toots". She married Ernest Barger, a plumber, and they had two children.

Barger began duckpin bowling in 1939, when she played in her cousin's duckpin league in Baltimore. Popularly thought to have been invented in Baltimore in 1900, the sport of duckpin bowling reached the height of its popularity in the 1940s and 1950s. The Baltimore Evening Sun newspaper sponsored an annual tournament from 1925 to 1968, which was often broadcast on local television. Barger won that tournament 12 times in 22 years, including six consecutive wins from 1946 to 1951. She was ranked the number one duckpin bowler by the National Duckpin Bowling Congress thirteen times during her career. She also was a three time winner of the U.S. Classic and a seven time winner of the Dixie Classic. Hailed as "Queen of Duckpins", Barger was a local celebrity. She and her husband owned the Libertytown Bowling Alley, where Barger gave bowling lessons. Barger retired from the sport in 1961 and stopped bowling entirely in 1995 after two knee replacements.

Barger was inducted into the Duckpin Bowling Hall of Fame, Anne Arundel County Sports Hall of Fame, and was the second woman inducted into the Maryland State Athletic Hall of Fame in 1961. She donated a number of items to the Smithsonian National Museum of American History, including a bowling ball engraved with her nickname Toots. In 1999, Sports Illustrated published lists of the greatest athletes in every sport of all time from each US state, including Barger on Maryland's list at number 50.

In 1992, she led an unsuccessful campaign to make duckpin bowling the official state sport of Maryland.

She died of cancer at a retirement home in Frederick, Maryland in 1998.
