= Sebastian Russo =

American doctor (1924–1981)

- Born: 15 November 1924; Riposto, Sicily, Italy
- Died: 27 February 1981 (aged 56); Baltimore, Maryland, United States
- Cause of death: Homicide by gunshot wound

Sebastian Russo (15 November 1924 – 27 February 1981) was a primary care physician from Baltimore, Maryland. He was murdered in his office in February 1981, and his case remains unsolved. After his death, he was declared "the last of the $5 doctors" in Baltimore, referring to his tendency to charge patients $5 or less for his services.

== Life and career ==
Russo was born on 15 November 1924 in Riposto, Sicily, Italy. He attended university in his native country and was later certified as a doctor in the United States. Russo and his wife, Mary, married in 1957. They had one daughter, Rosann.

Russo emigrated from Italy to the United States in July 1959. He soon settled in Baltimore and opened a medical practice on Harford Road in the city's Hamilton neighborhood. He was described as an old-fashioned family doctor who worked long hours, charged $5 or less for his services, and did not have a nurse or secretary. Local residents further described Russo as a "compassionate physician" and "almost like a saint" because of the quality of care they received from him.

== Death and investigation ==
On 27 February 1981, a neighbor heard a noise from Russo's office and called the Baltimore Police Department. Officers arrived at the scene shortly after 9:30pm and found Russo dead. He was lying on his back and had been shot once in the upper left chest. His keys were on the floor next to him, and the door to a drug cabinet had been left open. Detectives suspected at the time that Russo's murderer had been searching for drugs.

Other patients told police that a man came into Russo's office on the evening of the murder, left, returned a few minutes later, and waited an hour to be seen. The witnesses stated that when they left, the man and another woman were still in the office, but it was unclear if the two were together. No other details about the suspected murderer have ever been found, and the case remains unsolved. One local detective called Russo's murder "the toughest case I've ever been on".

== Legacy ==
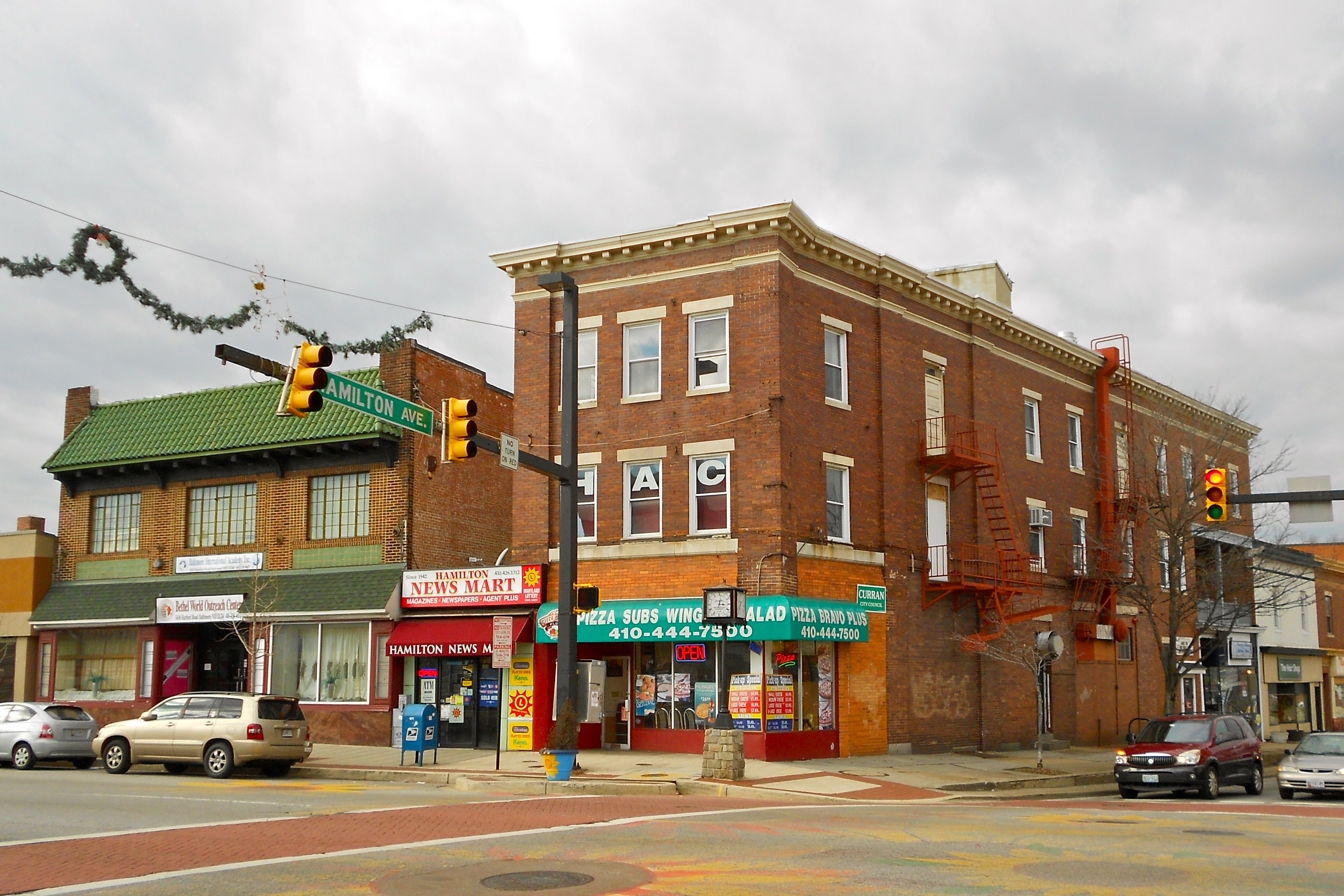
The southwest corner of Harford Road and Hamilton Avenue in Baltimore (2013). The clock honoring Sebastian Russo is shown in the center of the photo.

On 2 March 1981, about 400 mourners held a candlelight vigil and procession outside of Russo's office. About 700 residents attended his funeral the next day.

In September 1983, a wrought iron clock was erected in the Hamilton area to honor Russo's memory. The clock was paid for with city funds and with a unclaimed reward fund raised for information leading to Russo's murderer. The clock stands today at the southwest corner of Harford Road and Hamilton Avenue in the Hamilton Hills neighborhood, three blocks northeast of Russo's former office.

In 2007, the Baltimore City Health Department created the Dr. Sebastian Russo Award. The award recognized local health care providers who offered "dedicated and compassionate service to low-income individuals and families".

== See also ==
- Lists of unsolved murders
- List of unsolved murders (1980–1999)
