= Duckpin bowling =

Variation of the sport of bowling

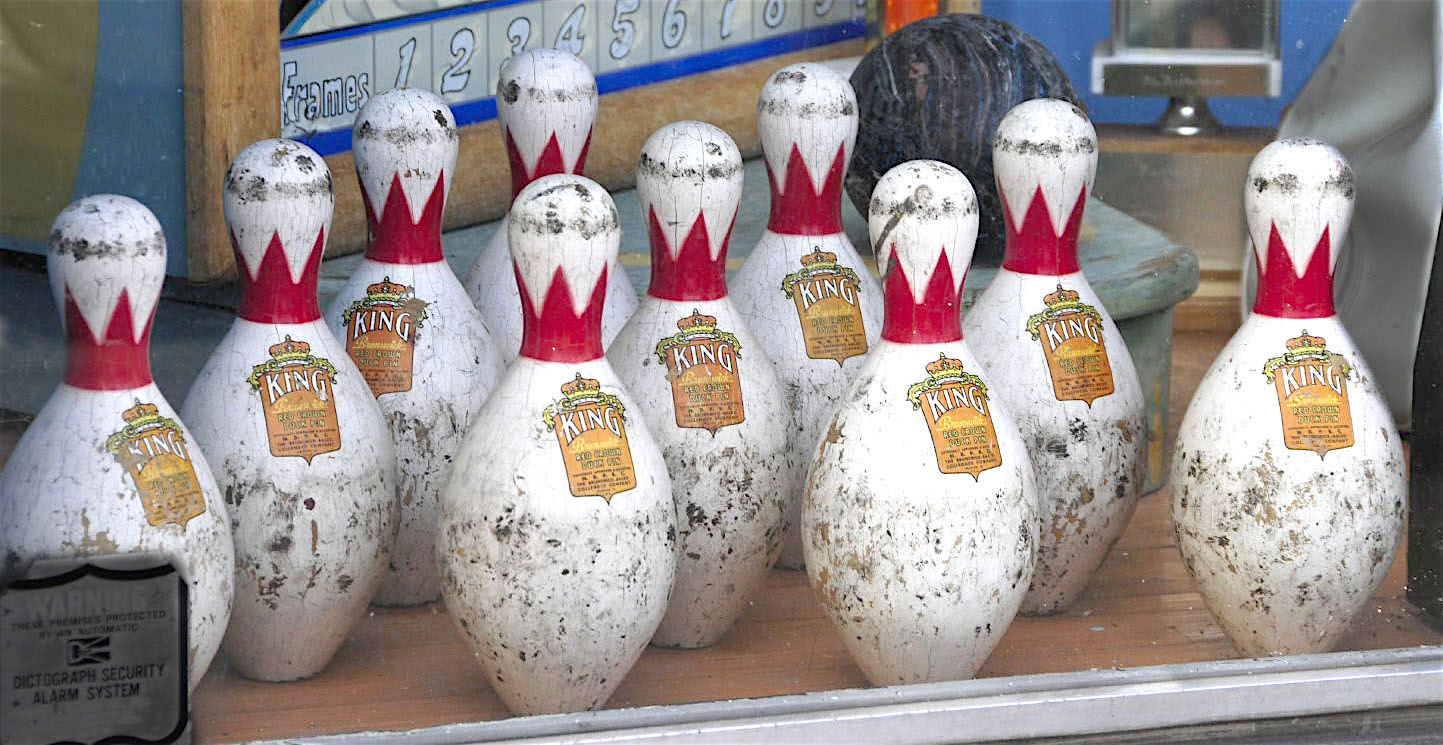
- Duckpins are smaller than pins used in other types of bowling
- First played: Circa early 1890s

Characteristics
- Contact: No
- Team members: Yes and individual
- Mixed-sex: Yes
- Type: Bowling
- Equipment: Duckpins, duckpin bowling ball, bowling lane
- Venue: Bowling alley
- Glossary: Glossary of bowling

Presence
- Country or region: Mid-Atlantic states of the US

Duckpin bowling is a variation of the sport of bowling.

Duckpin balls are 4 3/4 to 5 inches (12.1 to 12.7 cm) in diameter, weigh between 3 lb 6 oz and 3 lb 12 oz (1.53 and 1.70 kg) each, and lack finger holes. They are thus significantly smaller than those used in ten-pin bowling but are slightly larger and heavier than those used in candlepin bowling.

Duckpins, although arranged in a triangle identical to that used in ten-pin bowling, are shorter, slightly thinner, and lighter than their ten-pin equivalents, which (combined with the smaller ball) makes it more difficult to achieve a strike than in ten-pin bowling. For this reason, similar to candlepin bowling, duckpin bowlers are allowed three rolls per frame.

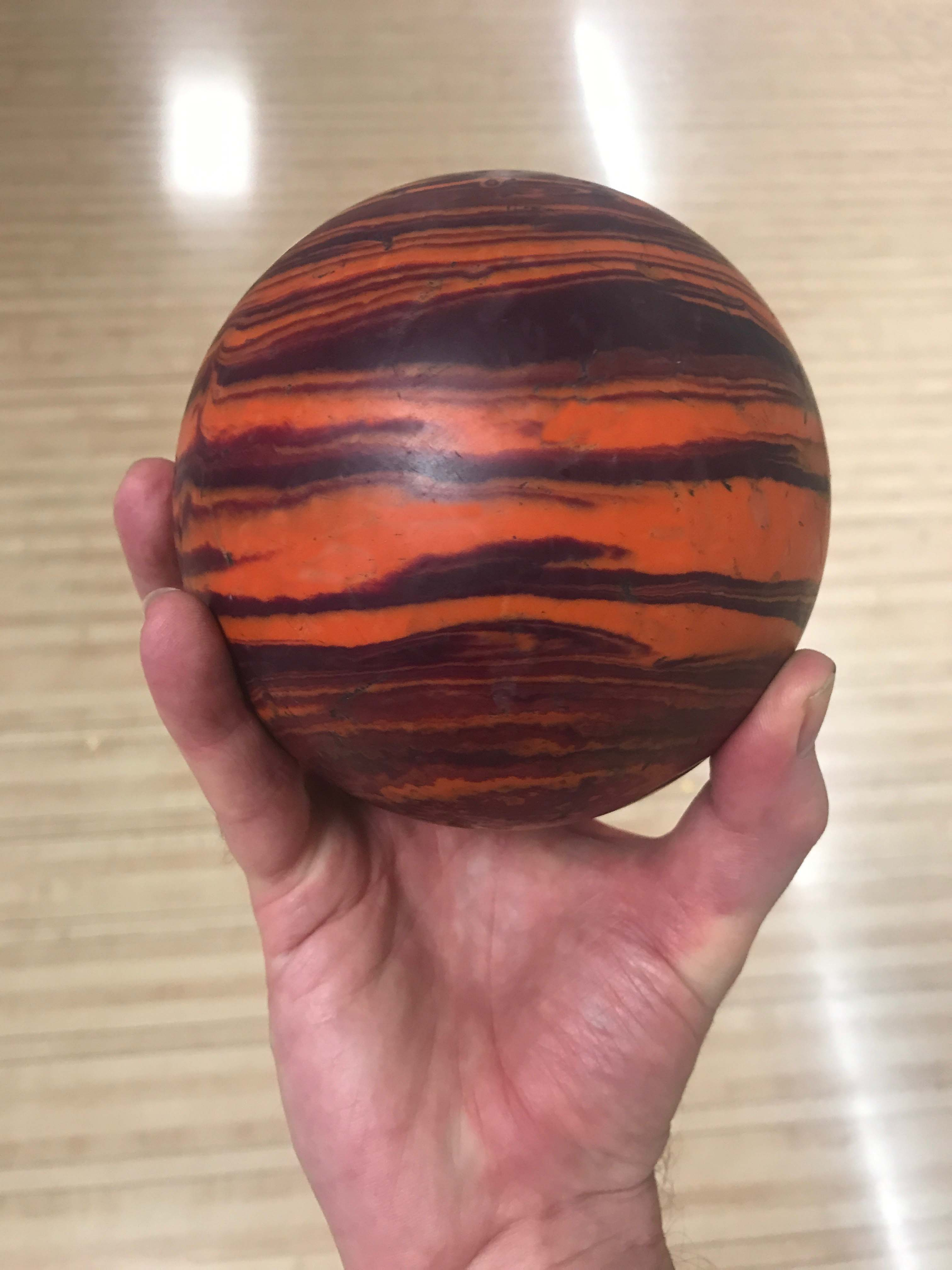
A duckpin bowling ball in an adult hand

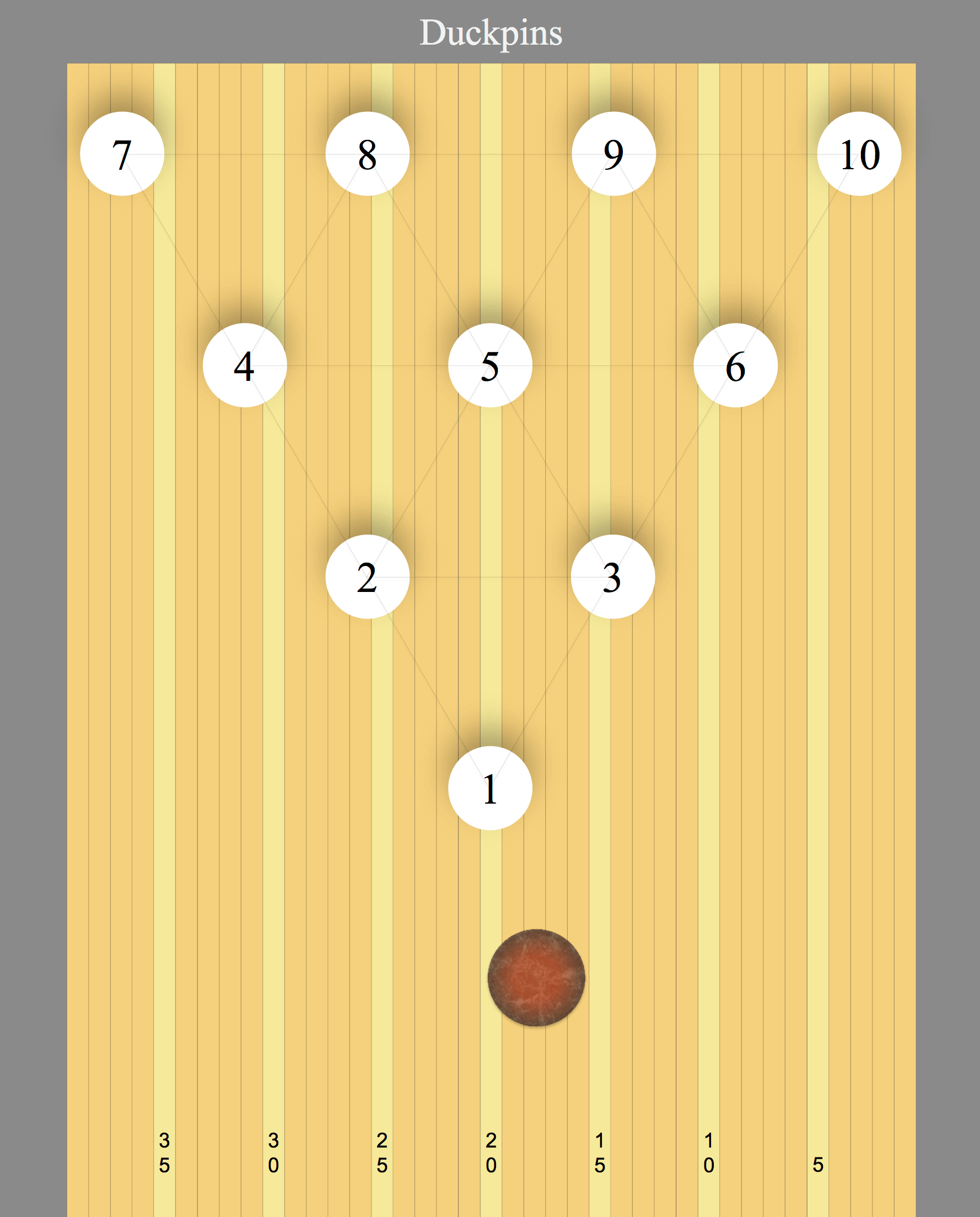
Duckpin balls are small enough to pass between same-row duckpins.

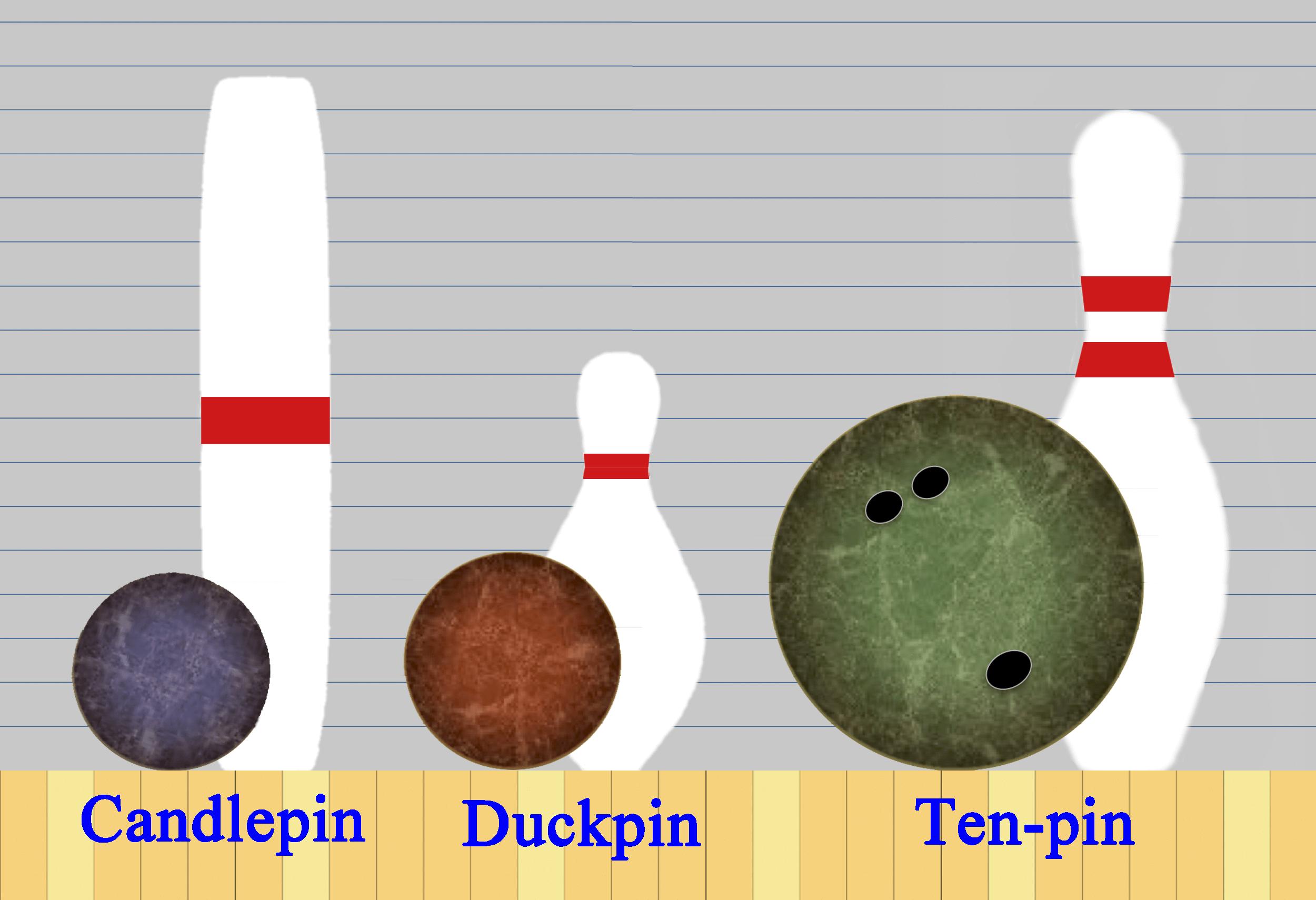
Scale diagram of balls and pins for three popular variations of bowling. The horizontal blue lines are one inch (2.5 cm) apart vertically.

== Rules ==
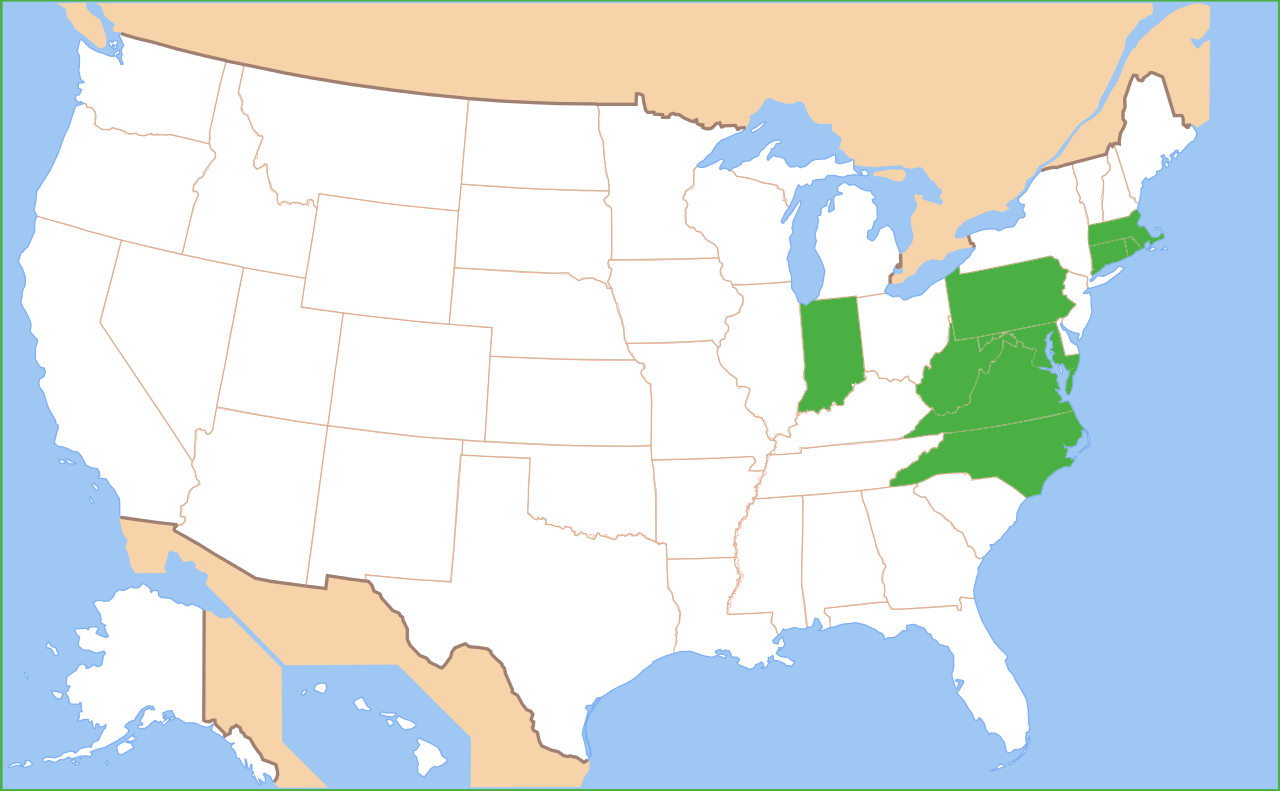
According to the National Duckpin Bowling Congress (NDBC), regulation duckpin bowling is played in nine states (shown here in green). Non-regulation "mini-duckpin" bowling is played in additional locations.

Duckpin bowling has rules similar to ten-pin bowling. In a 10-frame game, bowlers try to knock down pins in the fewest rolls per frame. Bowlers have three balls per frame, instead of two as in ten-pin bowling, to knock over a set of 10 pins. If a bowler knocks down all 10 pins with their first roll in a frame, it is scored as a strike. If all the pins are knocked down in two rolls, the bowler has made a spare. If all the pins are knocked down in three rolls, it is scored as a ten, as in candlepins, with no bonus. If pins are still standing after the third ball, the bowler gets one point for each pin knocked down.

In the case of a strike, the bowler gets 10 points plus the total number of pins knocked down with the next two balls rolled, for a maximum of 30 points. In the case of a spare, the bowler gets 10 points plus the number of pins knocked down with the next ball, for a maximum of 20 points. If it takes three balls to knock down all 10 pins, the bowler gets 10 points, with no bonus. A bowler's final score is the sum of the points earned over 10 frames (a spare or strike in the tenth frame earns one or two rolls respectively). The maximum possible score of 300 points, which is accomplished by rolling 12 strikes in a row, has never been achieved under official conditions.

Duckpin bowling lanes are the same size as ten-pin bowling lanes, but with smaller gutters.

== History ==
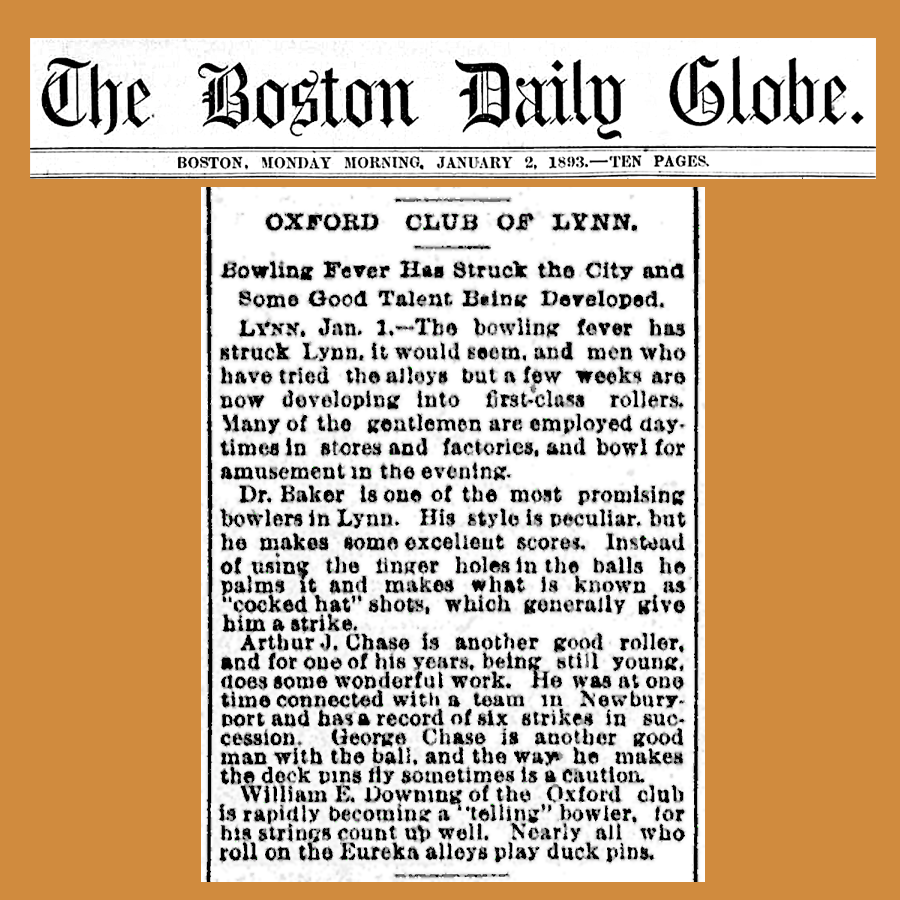
A January 2, 1893, article describes "bowling fever" and closes with a mention of playing "duck pins".

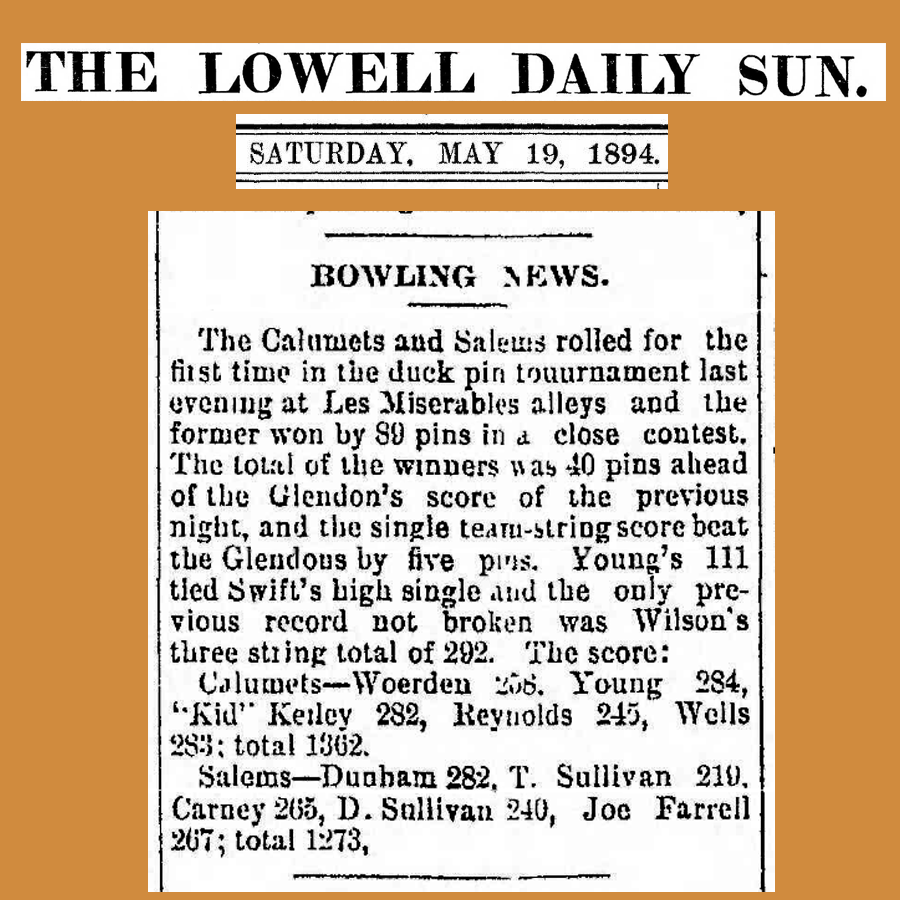
Early documentation of a "duck pin" bowling tournament in Lowell, Massachusetts, published on May 19, 1894. Quoted game averages range from about 73 to about 94.

The origin of duckpin bowling has been disputed. It is commonly asserted that the sport began in Baltimore c. 1900, at a bowling, billiards and pool hall owned by future baseball Hall of Famers John McGraw and Wilbert Robinson, both of the old (1882–1899) Baltimore Orioles. One such claim is reported in the Pittsburgh Press of March 3, 1929. However, research has since found references to duckpin dating to the early 1890s in New Haven, Boston, and Lowell, Massachusetts. Author Howard W. Rosenberg wrote in 2005 that his research showed the sport was around "at least as of 1894, and probably well before that", with former Duckpin News editor Stacy Karten stating in a 2016 publication that Rosenberg found an 1892 reference to duckpin in The Boston Globe.

Duckpin bowling was not an organized sport until the National Duckpin Bowling Congress (NDBC) was founded in 1927.

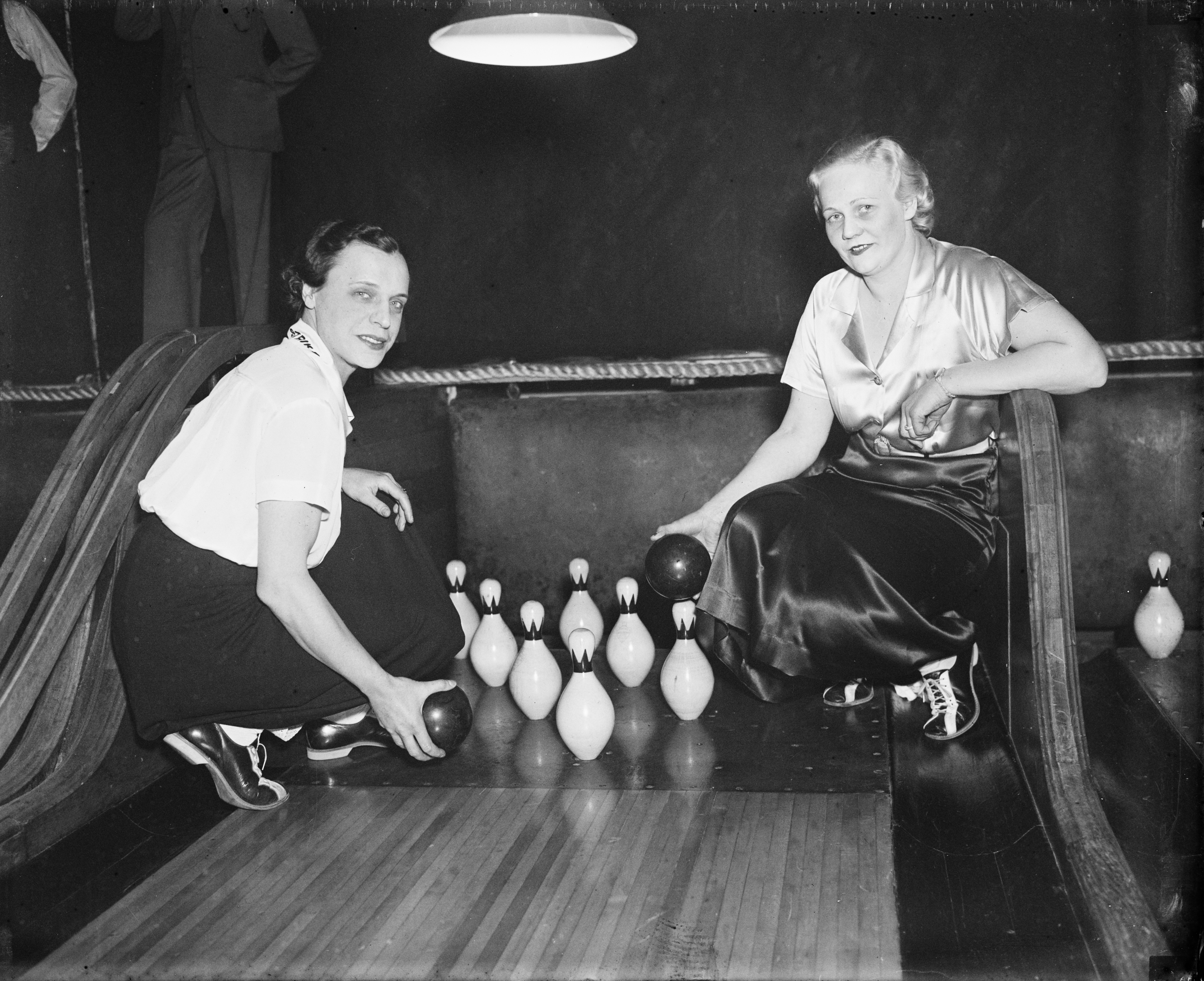
Duckpin bowlers, 1936

In 1953, submarine designer Ken Sherman developed the first automatic duckpin pinsetter, its design having over 1,000 moving parts. Sherman's refusal to sell his patent to ten-pin competitor Brunswick caused him to lack corporate investment needed to manufacture large numbers of duckpin pinsetters. Further, no parts for the Sherman pinsetter have been manufactured since 1973, meaning that anyone wanting to open a new bowling center must cannibalize parts. The absence of new pinsetter machines is thought to curtail growth of the sport, and spare parts must be scavenged or obtained from alleys that have closed. Only one company makes duckpins, and it only leases them.

The executive director of the National Duckpin Bowling Congress said in 2016 that there were 41 congress-certified duckpin bowling alleys, down from nearly 450 in 1963. In comparison, there were about 4,000 ten-pin centers in 2018. The Baltimore Sun reported in 2017 that the number of professional duckpin bowlers is down by more than 90 percent.

In 1982, the Women's National Duckpin Association (WNDA) was formed, conducting tournaments for women to compete professionally, with Ladies Professional Duckpin Tournament (LPDT) events extending back at least as early as 1974.

== Accomplishments and record scores ==
World record scores as reported by the NDBC for men (through March 2006)
No. Games in Set	Bowler	Score	Avg Score / Game	Year
1	Pete Signore Jr.	279	279	1992
3	Jeff Pyles	655	218	1978
4	Nappy Ranazzo	758	189	1994
5	William Schwartz	988	197	1988
6	James E. Deviers	1116	186	1984
Season	Jeff Pyles	164.47	164.47	1982-83

World record scores as reported by the NDBC for women (through July 2016)
No. Games in Set	Bowler	Score	Avg Score / Game	Year
1	Carole Gittings	265	265	1973
3	Diane Jasper	586	195	1988
4	Amy Bisson	741	185	2005
5	Amy Bisson Sykes	882	176	2016
6	Jill Manns	1017	169	2013
Season	Amy Bisson	155.08	155.08	2005-06

In 1999, Sports Illustrated named Elizabeth "Toots" Barger among the fifty top Maryland athletes of all time, Barger having claimed thirteen NDBC No. 1 rankings for having the highest female duckpinner average. Barger won nine world championships, and, in 1961, became the second woman to be inducted into the Maryland Athletic Hall of Fame.

== Variants ==
=== Rubber band duckpins ===
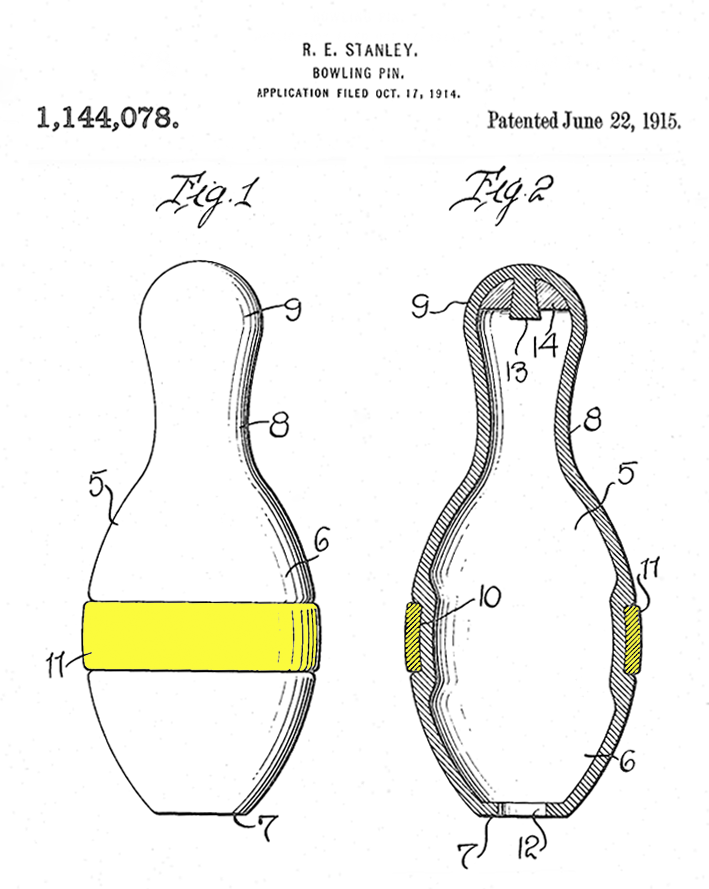
This 1915 U.S. patent shows a duckpin in which "a band of rubber or other resilient material 11" (yellow tinting added to image above) is placed "in an annular peripheral groove or channel 10".

In 1905 a variant called rubber band duckpins was introduced in the Pittsburgh, Pennsylvania area by William Wuerthele, in which the pins are circled with hard rubber bands to increase rebound action in collisions, and therefore scoring. Wuerthele observed bowlers wasting their third ball as well as flying pins injuring pin boys, so, according to a defunct publication called The Ducks, Wuerthele added the rubber band to increase scoring.

The American Duckpin Congress was formed in the 1920s to govern the game of rubber band duckpins. The organization later became the American Rubber Band Duckpin Bowling Congress in 1945 and became an affiliate of the National Duckpin Bowling Congress. The rubber band game is now almost extinct, with most of the lanes located in private clubs, though there is one alley in the U.S. still open to the public in Glassport, Pennsylvania.

As of 2018, rubber band duckpins was mostly limited to Québec, where it is called petites quilles.

There have been perfect games bowled in rubber band duckpin, including the largest duckpin prize ever won on television, CA$50,000 in 1994 (equivalent to CA$95,800 or US$68,500 in 2025). Since it is easier to knock down pins in rubber band duckpin, its rules are identical to those of ten-pin bowling.

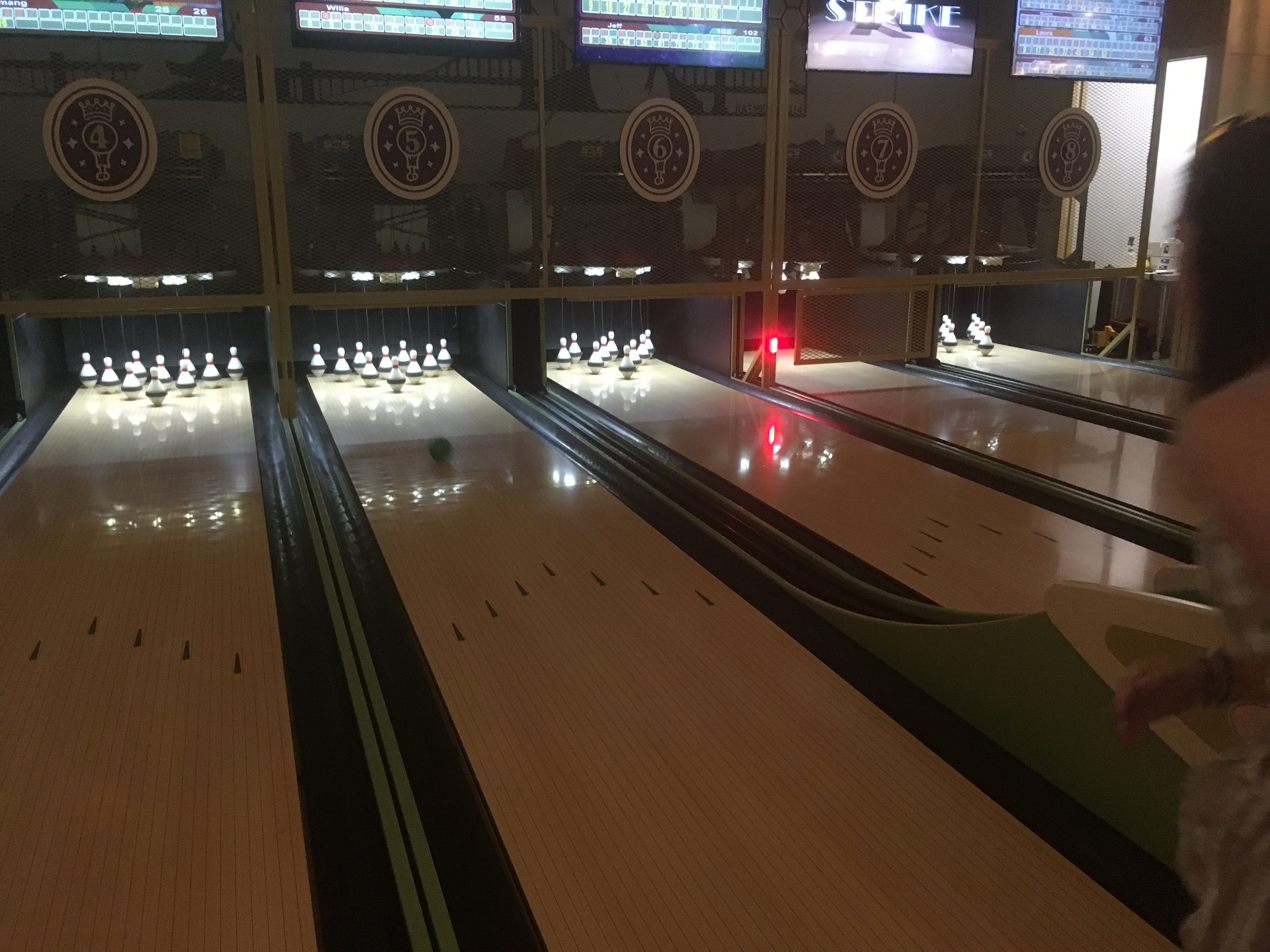
A mini duckpin alley in Pittsburgh, Pennsylvania

=== Mini duckpins ===
In mini duckpins, the lane is shorter than a standard duckpin lane, and the width of the lane is not standard. While there has never been a sanctioned perfect game in regulation duckpin bowling, 300 games are said to be relatively common in mini duckpin play.

== Comparison with ten-pin bowling ==
The USBC reported that there were 55,266 certified 300 games in ten-pin bowling in the 2013–2014 season alone, but there has never been a certified 300 game in duckpin bowling. A Connecticut man named Pete Signore Jr. came closest, with a 279 game in 1992.
