= Loch Raven, Baltimore =

Neighborhood in Baltimore, Maryland, United States

Coordinates: 39°21′38″N 76°34′52″W

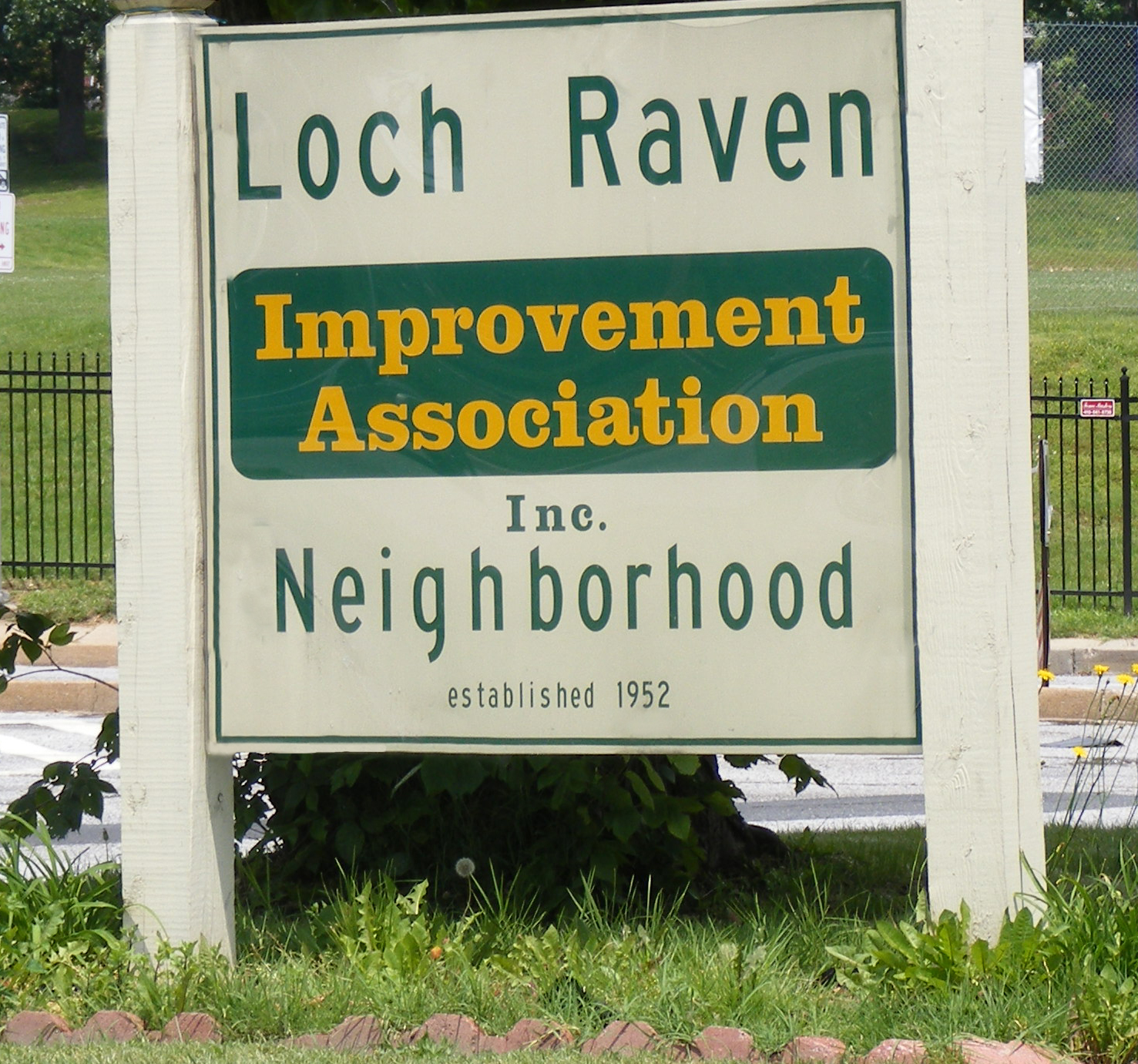
Neighborhood sign

Loch Raven is a neighborhood in the Northeastern part of Baltimore, Maryland. It is located in the Upper Northwood Section of Northeast Baltimore east of Loch Raven Boulevard, west of Mount Pleasant Park, and borders the Baltimore City/County Line and served by the Loch Raven Improvement Association.

== Demographics ==
Loch Raven is a predominantly residential neighborhood with houses that range from middle class to lower-income. According to the 2000 US Census, 5,930 people live in Loch Raven with 80% African-American and 16.5% White. The median family income is $42,702. 94.3% of the houses are occupied, and 44.1% of them are occupied by the home's owner.

== Special Interest ==
Loch Raven is the name of a song on Animal Collective's sixth album, Feels. The band grew up in and around the suburbs of northern Baltimore and the adjacent Baltimore County, specifically Noah Lennox a.k.a. Panda Bear who grew up in the neighbouring suburb of Roland Park.
