= Taylor Heights, Baltimore =

Neighborhood of Baltimore, Maryland

Coordinates: 39°21′59″N 76°31′54″W

Taylor Heights is a neighborhood in northeast Baltimore. The neighborhood contains only a few homes because Parkwood Cemetery takes up much of the neighborhood. A major road in the neighborhood is Taylor Avenue, which runs from Overlea in the east to Towson in the west, at which point it becomes Goucher Boulevard/Hillen Road.
