= Lauraville, Baltimore =

- Lauraville Historic District
- U.S. National Register of Historic Places
- U.S. Historic district
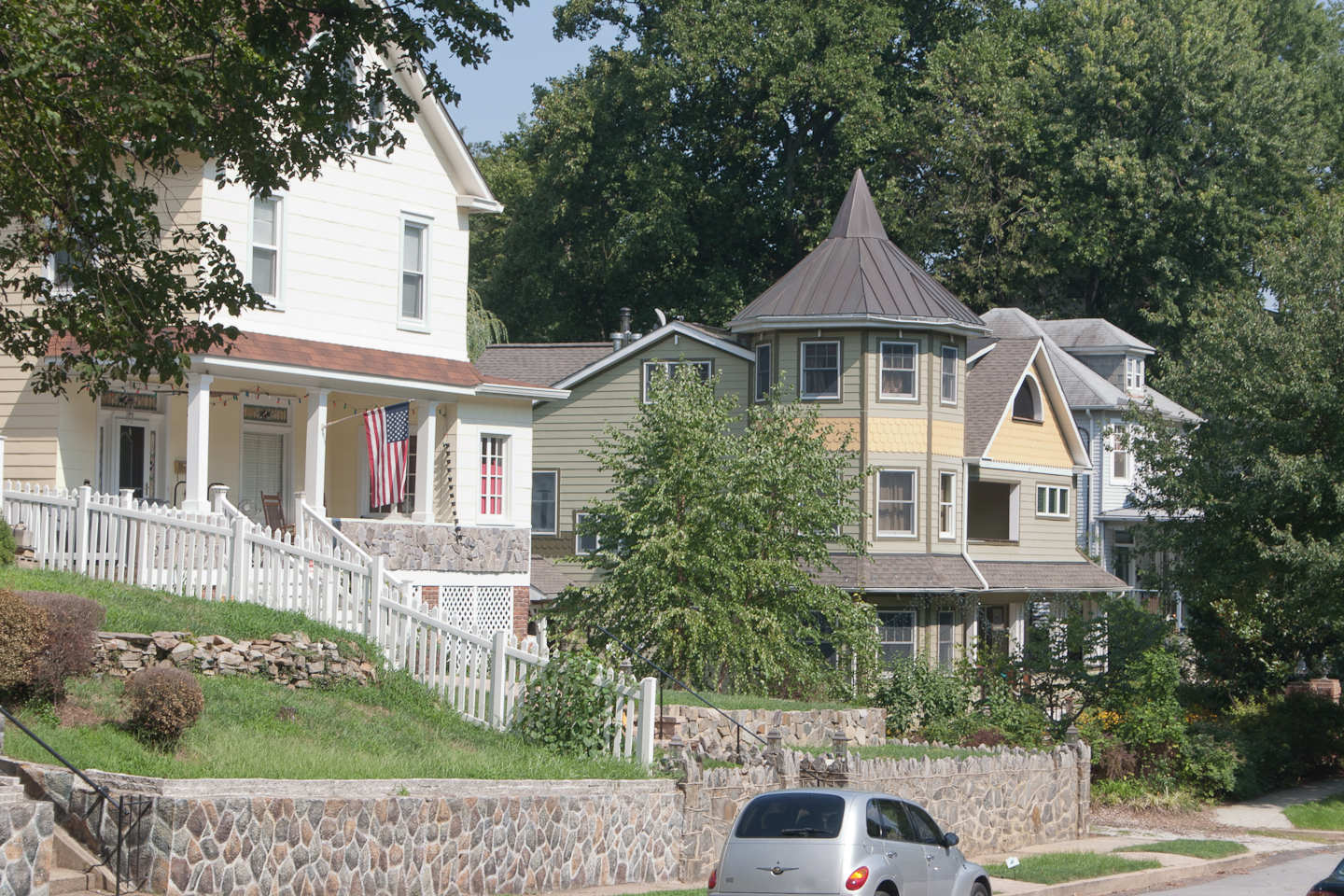
- Houses along Overland Avenue, August 2011

- Location within Baltimore Location within Maryland Location within the United States
- Location: Roughly bounded by Harford Rd., Herring Run Creek, Cold Spring Ln., Charlton Ave., Halcyon Ave., Grindon Rd., and Echodale Ave., Baltimore, Maryland
- Coordinates: 39°20′44″N 76°34′23″W
- Area: 310 acres (130 ha)
- Built: 1877
- Architect: multiple
- Architectural style: Italianate, Queen Anne Style
- NRHP reference No.: 01001371
- Added to NRHP: December 28, 2001

Lauraville is a neighborhood in northeast Baltimore, Maryland. The neighborhood is bounded on the east by Harford Road, on the north by Echodale Avenue, on the south by Argonne Drive and Herring Run Park, and on the west side by Morgan Park and Morgan State University, with East Cold Spring Lane passing through the center of Lauraville.

== History ==
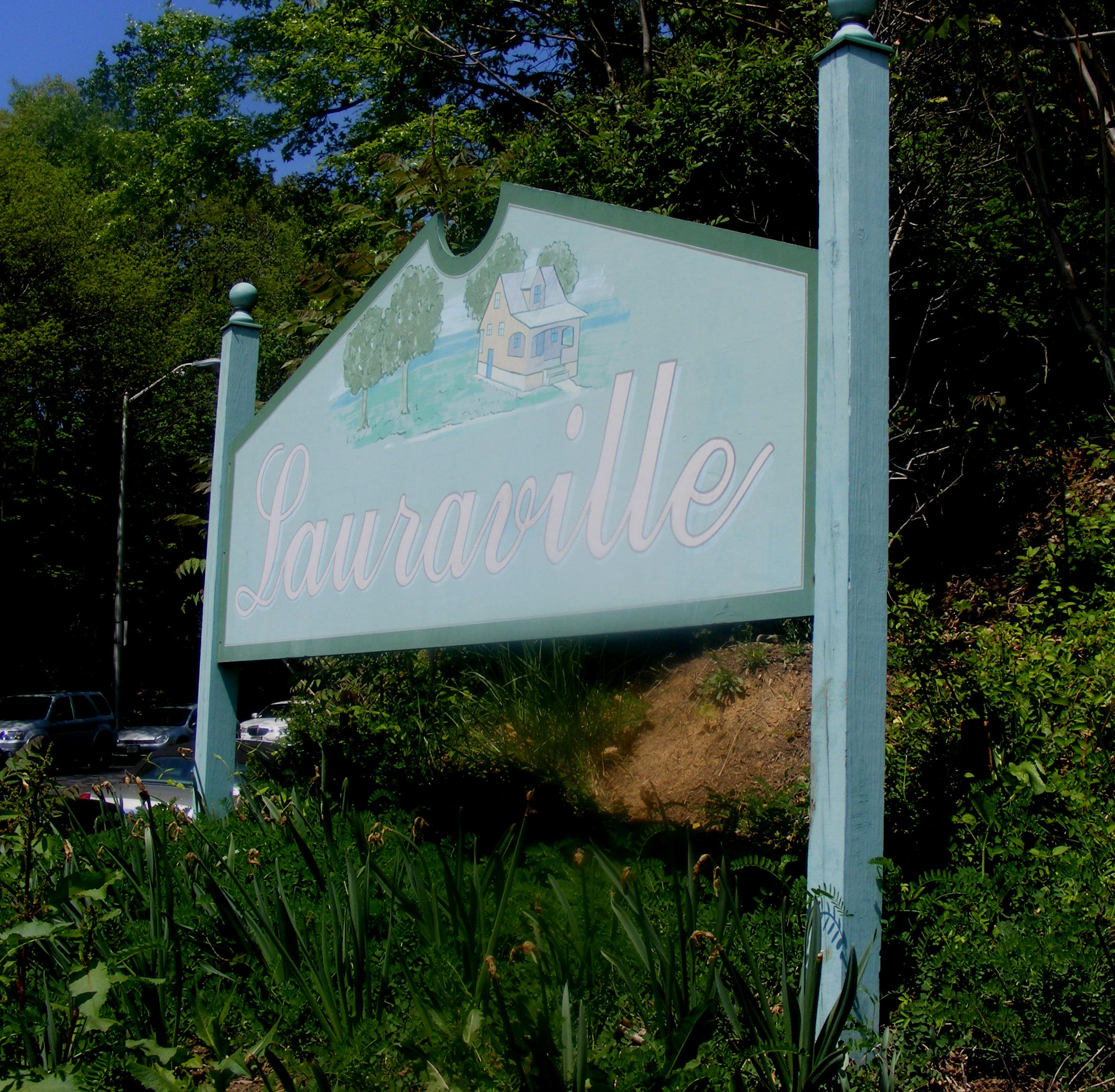

Lauraville is named for the daughter of John Henry Keene, who was a local property owner and businessman active after the American Civil War. Soon after the Civil War, Lauraville became an official village, with its own post office, and as a result its present name. Local residents who had lobbied for a local mail service were confronted by the Post Office's requirement for a village name as a mail destination. At a local meeting, chief supporter for the village post office, John Henry Keene, a local property owner who also operated a planing mill and lumber yard on the site of today's Bond Lumber, suggested that the community be named after his daughter Laura. Apparently that was acceptable to all present, for the area has been Lauraville since.

Until Hamilton got its own post office, the Lauraville post office which was located in William Emmel's confectionery store on the west side of Harford Road, south of Southern Avenue, handled all of the mail service along Harford Road, between the Herring Run, and Parkville.

In the last decades of the 19th century Lauraville became thoroughly self-sufficient. Blacksmiths and carpenters practiced their trades along Harford Road, and virtually any necessity could be bought locally for the house or farm. Truck farms covered the area and a wide variety of locally raised produce, as well as fresh meat, poultry, and dairy products were available. Weber's Park, a brewery, with adjoining picnic grounds and beer garden operated for many years along Harford Road in the Southern end of Lauraville, about opposite today's Overland Avenue. A fire station for the volunteer fire company was also built, on the site of the present modern engine house.

In the early 1870s the Hall Springs Passenger Railway opened its limited horse-drawn passenger service on the Harford Road between the Hall Springs Hotel and a car barn south of 25th Street, where connections could be made for downtown Baltimore. While never wildly successful, the line operated continuously until it was electrified and extended north to Hamilton Avenue in the 1890s, and eventually absorbed into the United Railways and Electric Company street railway system.

This growth and improvement of the Harford Road transit service coincided with the rapid development of Lauraville as a residential suburban community. First commuter transit, then automobile travel, made communities like Lauraville increasingly accessible to the Baltimore Downtown.

In 1895 land was acquired from the Garrett family for a new schoolhouse, which was built in the late 1890s at Morello Road, between Rueckert and Ailsa Avenues. The school was and is still called Garrett Heights, though it previously had junior high grades as well as the elementary grades. The 1932 addition to Garrett Heights is the only portion still standing, as the older wing was destroyed by fire in 1969. By 1918, when most of Lauraville was annexed to Baltimore City, many houses had already been built.

In 1918, residents of Lauraville were incensed that the nearby Ivy Mill property, where Morgan State University would eventually be built, had been sold to a "negro college." They attempted to have the sale revoked by filing suit in the circuit court in Towson, which dismissed the suit. They then appealed the case to the state Court of Appeals. The appellate court upheld the lower court decision, finding no basis that siting the college at this location would constitute a public nuisance. Despite some ugly threats and several demonstrations against the project, Morgan State was allowed to be constructed at this site and would later expand.

== Housing ==
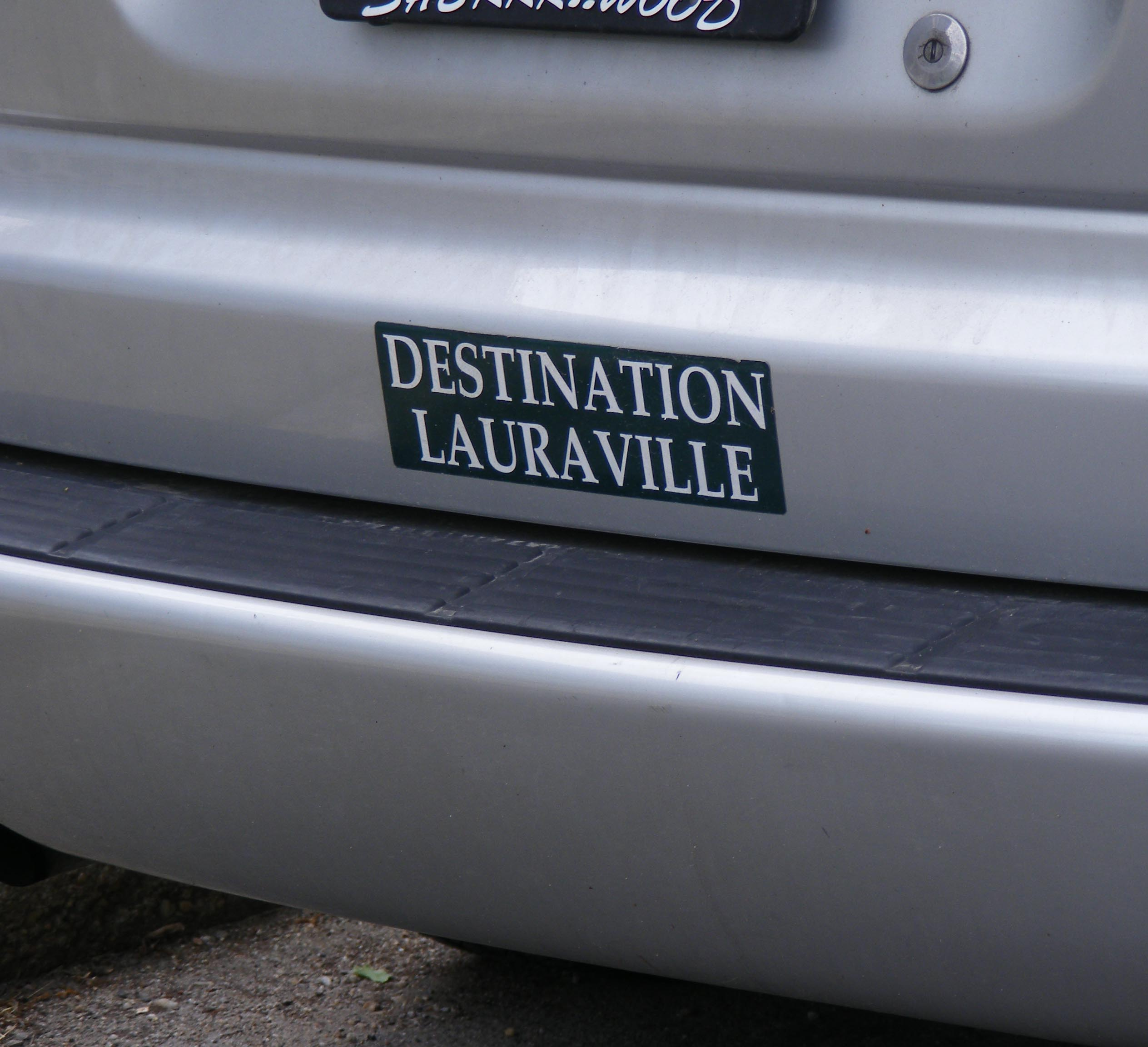
Lauraville bumper sticker

The area was developed by several subdivisions during the period between 1910 and 1930 as an upper middle class neighborhood, with many houses built on double lots. Sales in 1910 indicated houses were priced at $4,000 at a time when the typical house in Baltimore sold for $1,200. While Lauraville was built over a period of years by various developers, most of the houses are detached, single family frame or cedar shingle structures, similar in style. The Lauraville neighborhood benefits from irregular street patterns, and from the considerable number of shade trees that the residents have striven to protect.

== Trivia ==
Lauraville is mentioned on the Baltimore-based HBO drama The Wire as the home neighborhood of fictional Baltimore Police Detective Jimmy McNulty.
