= Herring Run =

Tributary of the Back River in Baltimore, Maryland

Location
- Country: United States
- State: Maryland
- District: Baltimore City, Baltimore County

Physical characteristics
- Source
  - location: Carney
  - coordinates: 39°23′52″N 76°32′55″W
- Mouth: Back River (Maryland)
  - location: Rosedale
  - coordinates: 39°18′27″N 76°31′12″W
  - elevation: 0 ft (0 m)
- Length: 11.1 mi (17.9 km)

Basin features
- Tributaries
  - left: Biddison Run
  - right: Chinquapin Run; Armistead Run

The Herring Run is an 11.1-mile-long (17.9 km) tributary of the Back River located in Baltimore, Maryland.

== Geography ==
The 31-square-mile (80 km^{2}) watershed has its headwaters in Towson, Maryland, and flows through Baltimore County and Baltimore City and back into the county before discharging into the Back River, which empties into the Chesapeake Bay. The principal tributaries of Herring Run are the Western Branch, Chinquapin Run, Tiffany Run, Armistead Run, Biddison Run, Moores Run and Redhouse Run. The total length of the Herring Run main stem and tributaries is over 41 miles (66 km).

=== Herring Run Park ===
Herring Run Park is a 375 acres (152 ha) wooded parkland in northeast Baltimore through which Herring Run flows for 2.3 miles (3.7 km). The politician William Smith lived on land now included in the park, which he purchased in 1770. The land for Herring Run Park was donated to the City of Baltimore by the real estate developer Frank Novak.

== Water pollution ==
The Maryland Department of the Environment has listed the Herring Run as an impaired tributary, due to the elevated amounts of fecal coliform bacteria found in it. Nonetheless, efforts continue to improve the stream's water quality.

== Herring Run Watershed Association ==
The Herring Run Watershed Association (HRWA) was founded in 1978 (originally as the Friends of Northeast Parks and Streams) and is now a fully staffed 501(c)(3) nonprofit organization dedicated to stewarding the watershed. Its efforts include stream cleanups; stream plantings; rain barrel distribution; resident education; green jobs creation; advocacy, and running a native plant nursery.

In 2008, HRWA completed construction on the Herring Run Watershed Center, a state-of-the-art green building that serves as the organization's headquarters and education center. Designed by Ziger/Snead Architects and built by Baltimore Green Construction, the Watershed Center was the first LEED-NC building in Baltimore City, winning a "Gold" designation from the United States Green Building Council.

It merged with four other groups to form Blue Water Baltimore in 2010.
