= Maryland State Athletic Hall of Fame =

Athletics hall of fame

- Native name: MDSAHOF
- Type: Hall of Fame
- Awarded for: Athletics
- Country: United States
- Eligibility: Athletes associated with the state of Maryland
- Website: mdsahof.com

The Maryland State Athletic Hall of Fame is an athletics hall of fame in the U.S. state of Maryland. The Hall was founded in 1956 to honor Marylanders for their accomplishments in sports.
