= List of roads in Baltimore County, Maryland =

The following are major and notable roads in Baltimore County, Maryland.

== A ==
Road	Route	Places	Landmarks	Notes
Allegheny Avenue		Towson		Souris Saloon
Annapolis Road	Waterview Avenue (in Baltimore City) to Belle Grove Road (in Anne Arundel County)	Baltimore Highlands		Turns into Baltimore-Annapolis Boulevard in Anne Arunel County, which is Exit 5 off Baltimore Beltway

== B ==
Street	Route	Places	Landmarks	Notes
Back River Neck Road	Old Eastern Avenue to Riverview Road	Essex	Rocky Point Park	One of the original boundaries of Essex. Continues north of Old Eastern as Stemmers Run Road. Part of route of bus routes 23, 55, and 160.
Baldwin Mill Road	Pleasantville Road to Maryland Route 23 (in Harford County)	Baldwin		
Baltimore National Pike	Edmondson Avenue (in Baltimore City) to I-70 (in Howard County)	Catonsville	Westview Mall; Patapsco State Park	Part of US Route 40. Exit 15 off Baltimore Beltway. Part of route of Bus Routes 20 and 150.
Beaver Dam Road	Shawan Road to Padonia Road	Cockeysville	Oregon Ridge Park; Gilroy Road Light Rail Stop; Warren Road Light Rail Stop	Part of a longer road that is made of Cuba Road, Beaver Dam Road, Deereco Road, and Greenspring Drive.
Beckleysville Road	Brick Store Road to Freeland Road	Beckleysville; Middletown		
Belair Road	North Avenue (in Baltimore City) to Harford Road in Harford County, where US-1 splits into Baltimore Pike and Belair Bypass, both designated US-1.	Overlea; Fullerton; Perry Hall; Kingsville	Gunpowder Falls State Park	Part of US Route 1. Exit 32 off Baltimore Beltway. Part of route of Bus Routes 15 and 55.
Belfast Road	Falls Road to York Road	Butler; Sparks		Exit 24 off I-83
Benson Avenue	S. Caton Avenue (in Baltimore City) to Sulphur Spring Road	Arbutus	Caton Center	Becomes Potomac Avenue south of Sulphur Spring Road.
Bethlehem Boulevard	North Point Boulevard to Shipyard Road	Edgemere; Sparrows Point		Exit 43 off Baltimore Beltway
Black Rock Road	Lower Beckleysville Road to Falls Road			
Bloomsbury Avenue	Frederick Road to Rolling Road	Catonsville	Catonsville High School	Continues north of Frederick Road as Ingleside Avenue. Part of Bus Route 77.
Bonita Avenue	Owings Mills Boulevard to Worthington Avenue	Owings Mills		Was previously a longer road that ran from Reisterstown Road. In the 1980s, part of this road was converted into Owings Mills Boulevard. The southern portion was renamed from Bonita Ave to Groff Ln.
Bosley Avenue	Fairmount Avenue to University Ave in Towson (semicircle)	Towson	Baltimore County Courthouse; Northeast side of the Towson University campus	Southeast of University Avenue (southern end), changes to Burke Avenue, which east of York Rd becomes a two-lane residential street, later changing names to Hillen Road that continues to the area of the Towson Marketplace and then becomes Putty Hill Avenue.
Broening Highway	Baltimore Beltway to O'Donnell Street (in Baltimore City)	Dundalk	Dundalk Marine Terminal; Maryland Transportation Authority headquarters	Exit 44 off Baltimore Beltway
Burke Avenue	University Ave to Hillen Rd	Towson		
Butler Road	Hanover Pike to Falls Road	Glyndon; Butler	Historic Glyndon township and rail station	Splits into Worthingon Avenue; at this point, turning left continues on Butler, and going straight goes onto Worthington, which leads to Greenspring Avenue

== C ==
Street	Route	Communities	Landmarks	Notes
Caves Road	Garrison Forest Road to Greenspring Avenue	Owings Mills		Once served by defunct bus route M-12
Charles Street	Federal Hill (in Baltimore city) to Bellona Avenue (north of Beltway)	Rodgers Forge; Towson	Greater Baltimore Medical Center; Sheppard Pratt Hospital; Baltimore County Board of Education	In Baltimore City, Charles Street is one of the city's main streets, dividing the west and east sides of the city. In Baltimore County, Charles Street continues as a major, multi-lane, divided road up to where it intersects with the Baltimore Beltway (exit 25).
Chesapeake Avenue		Towson	BCPL Towson branch	One-way pair with Pennsylvania Avenue
Cockeys Mill Road	Main Street (Reisterstown) to dead end	Reisterstown	BCPL (Reisterstown branch); Franklin Elementary School	Former location of the destroyed R. Brent Keyser house. The house was used during the 19th century as the Confederacy Signal Corps, and was destroyed by fire in 1940. Some of the remains of a part of this road that is no longer in use for automobile traffic is in use for a trail in the Liberty Watershed.
Corbett Road	York Road to Old York Road	Monkton		
Cranbrook Road	York Road to Padonia Road	Cockeysville		
Cromwell Bridge Road	Providence Road to Cub Hill Road/Glen Arm Road	Towson; Parkville	Loch Raven High School	Formerly Maryland Route 567. Exit 29 off the Baltimore Beltway (shared with Loch Raven Boulevard. The section west of this exit and inside the Beltway is lined with office space and homes while the section east of this exit and outside the Beltway is primarily rural and undeveloped. At its northeastern end, Cub Hill Road is to the right, and Glen Arm Road to the left. That part of Cromwell Bridge between Satyr Hill Road and Cub Hill Road was, until the late 1800s, part of Old Harford Road.

== D ==
Street	Route	Communities	Landmarks	Notes
Deereco Road	Padonia Road to Greenspring Dr	Timonium	Timonium station	Part of a longer road that is made of McCormick Road, Beaver Dam Road, Deereco Road, and Greenspring Drive, which starts in the north at York Rd and proceeds south to Timonium Rd.
Deer Park Road	Liberty Road to Sykesville Road (in Carroll County)	Randallstown; Reisterstown; Owings Mills	Soldiers Delight Natural Environmental Area	Beginning off of MD 26 Liberty Road, Deer Park dead-ends past Ivy Mill Road into a residential neighborhood. Deer Park Road, crosses Liberty Reservoir one mile north of its Ivy Mill Road intersection via the Nicodemus Road bridge, where it continues into Carroll County and terminates at MD 32 Sykesville Road.
Dogwood Road	Old Court Road to Baltimore City Line (continues as Franklintown Road)	Windsor Mill; Woodlawn	St. Mary's Episcopal Church	
Dolfield Road / Boulevard	various sections	Owings Mills		Dolfield Road, once a single road, has various sections. One is from Painters Mill Road to Owings Mills Boulevard running through Owings Mills Industrial Park, this portion technically named S. Dolfield Road. This road then continues across Owings Mills Boulevard as Dolfield Road and dead ends near I-795. The remaining major portion of the road runs from Deer Park Road to Lakeside Boulevard. As that road continues north of Lakeside Boulevard, it converts to a major multi-lane roadway called Dolfield Boulevard, proceeding north from Lakeside Boulevard to Reisterstown Road as its terminus.
Dover Road	Hanover Pike to Butler Road (northern section); Tufton Avenue to Greenspring Avenue (southern section)		Home of Cal Ripken Jr.	Part of former route of No. 5 Streetcar Line
Dulaney Valley Road	York Road/Joppa Road (known as Towson Circle to Manor Road	Hampton; Timonium; Long Green	Towson Town Center; Towson Sheraton; Goucher College; Stella Maris Hospice; Loch Raven Reservoir and Dam	Route 146 becomes Jarrettsville Pike at the Loch Raven Reservoir and Dam. Dulaney Valley Road splits off unnumbered, then continues east to Manor Road.
Dundalk Avenue	Eastern Avenue to dead end at Peach Orchard Park.	Dundalk		

== E ==
Street	Route	Communities	Landmarks	Notes
Eastern Boulevard	President Street to Greenbank Road	Essex; Middle River; Chase	Eastpoint Mall	Exit 38 off Baltimore Beltway. Known as "Eastern Avenue" throughout Baltimore City and up to crossing of Back River. Then known as "Eastern Boulevard" from Back River to Carroll Island Road. From there to end, again known as "Eastern Avenue"
Ebenezer Road	Belair Road to Honeygo Boulevard; Philadelphia Road to Graces Quarters Road	Perry Hall; Chase		Formerly designated as MD-149. There are two Ebenezer Roads: one in the Perry Hall area, and one in Chase
Edmondson Avenue	Chalfonte Drive to Fremont Avenue (in Baltimore City)	Catonsville	Catonsville Middle School	Exit 14 off Baltimore Beltway

== F ==
Street	Route	Community	Landmarks	Notes
Fairmount Avenue	York Road to Hillen Road	Towson	Towson Town Center; Towson Sheraton; Goucher College	A short, divided multi-lane road that runs along the north and east sides of central Towson. This road, when going straight, changes into Goucher Boulevard. Turning south at this point continues on Fairmount Avenue, which continues south a few blocks to Hillen Road. That street continues as Aigburth Avenue to a dead end several blocks later. See this map for details. Not to be confused with the Fairmount Avenue that runs east-west in sections throughout Baltimore City.
Falls Road	Lanvale Street (south/east)/Lafayette Avenue (north/west) (in Baltimore City) to Schalk Road No. 1 (in Carroll County)	Brooklandville; Butler; Beckleysville	Falls Road Light Rail Stop; Lake Roland; The Cloisters; Greenspring Station; St. Paul's School	Just north of the interchange between the Baltimore Beltway and the Jones Falls Expressway, the portion of Falls Road from Baltimore City comes to an end, and continuing straight leads to Joppa Road. A left turn is required to continue on Falls Road. See this map for details. Part of route of Bus Route 60.
Fork Road	Harford Road to Pleasantville Road	Baldwin; Fork		Continues north of Fork as Baldwin Mill Road
Franklin Boulevard	Red Run Boulevard to Reisterstown Road	Reisterstown		Exit 7 off I-795. Continues east of Reisterstown Road as E. Cherry Hill Road. Changes into Red Run Boulevard at Church Road.
Franklin Square Drive	Campbell Boulevard to Rossville Boulevard	White Marsh; Rosedale	Franklin Square Hospital	Section between King Avenue and Campbell Boulevard completed in 1997. Served by bus routes 4, 35, and 55.
Frederick Road	Baltimore City Line to Howard County Line	Catonsville	BCPL Catonsville branch Benjamin Banneker Historical Park	Exit 13 off Baltimore Beltway. Continues in Baltimore City known as "Frederick Avenue," and in Howard County through historic Ellicott City known as "Main Street." West of historic Ellicott City, becomes Frederick Road once again, and also known as "Baltimore National Road" until MD-144 reaches Frederick. Part of route of Bus Route 10.
Freeland Road	Middletown Road to Harris Mill Road	Middletown; Freeland; Maryland Line		Exit 37 off I-83. Formerly designated MD-409

== G ==
Street	Route	Places	Landmarks	Notes
Garrison Forest Road	Greenspring Valley Road to Greenspring Avenue (5.4 miles)	Owings Mills	Rosewood Center (boundary of property); Irvine Nature Center; Maryland Veterans Cemetery; St. Thomas Church; Garrison Forest School	Most northern block carries MD-129 traffic. Part of route of now defunct bus routes 102 and Part of route of M-17
Glen Arm Road	Cromwell Bridge Road to Harford Road	Glen Arm		Until the late 1800s was part of Old Harford Road. The portion of the road from Harford Road west to the 90-degree turn just west of Long Green Pike is technically named Glen Arm Road E.
Golden Ring Road	Hazelwood Avenue to Pulaski Highway	Rosedale		Part of route of Bus Route 55
Goucher Boulevard	Fairmount Avenue to Loch Raven Boulevard	Towson	Calvert Hall College High School	Part of route of Bus Route 55
Greenspring Avenue	Druid Hill Park (in Baltimore City) to Tufton Avenue	Pikesville; Owings Mills	Quarry Lake	On the north end, continues as Worthington Avenue
Greenspring Valley Road	Township Drive to Falls Road	Owings Mills; Stevenson; Brooklandville	Stevenson University; Gramercy Mansion	Part of route of Bus Route 60.
Gwynn Oak Avenue	Security Boulevard to Belvieu Avenue (in Baltimore City)	Woodlawn	Gwynn Oak Park	Formerly Maryland Route 126. Served by bus routes 44 and 57.
Gwynnbrook Avenue	Reisterstown Road to Garrison Forest Road	Owings Mills	Gwynnbrook State Park; Jewish Community Center Owings Mills location	Border to property of the now-defunct Rosewood Center. Runs through property that dates back to the 18th century.

== H ==
Street	Route	Communities	Landmarks	Notes
Hanover Pike	Westminster Pike to Pennsylvania line (continues as Route 94 after crossing into Pennsylvania, known as "Baltimore Pike")	Reisterstown; Boring; Upperco	Camp Fretterd (Maryland National Guard); Maryland Emergency Management Agency	Old Hanover Road parallels the road just north of Butler Road
Harford Road	Ensor Street (in Baltimore City) to Belair Road (in Harford County)	Parkville; Carney; Cub Hill; Fork		
Hillen Road	Fairmount Avenue to Goucher Boulevard and Loch Raven Boulevard to Baltimore City line.	Towson		This is an extension of Towsontown Blvd to the west. The road proceeds several miles into Baltimore City.
Hilltop Circle	Continuous circle accessed from Hilltop Road, Poplar Avenue, and UMBC Boulevard	Catonsville	Encircles the University of Maryland, Baltimore County campus.	Commonly referred to as the "Campus Loop"
Holabird Avenue	Newkirk Street (in Baltimore City) to Merritt Boulevard	Dundalk	BCPL North Point branch	Continues east of Merritt Boulevard as Wise Avenue. Sometimes misspelled as "Holibird Avenue."
Hollins Ferry Road	Washington Boulevard (in Baltimore City) to dead end west of Halethorpe Farms Road	Lansdowne; Riverview; Lakeland; Mt. Winans		Exit 9 off Baltimore Beltway. Part of route of bus routes 36, 51, and 77.
Honeygo Boulevard	Perry Hall Boulevard to Belair Road	White Marsh; Perry Hall	White Marsh Mall; White Marsh Town Center	Last segment between Forge Road and Belair Road completed in December 2009. Part of route of bus routes 15 and 35

== I ==
Street	Route	Communities	Landmarks	Notes
Ingleside Avenue	Security Boulevard to Frederick Road	Woodlawn; Catonsville	Westview Mall; Old Salem Church and Cemetery	Has entrance to I-70. Continues north of Security Boulevard as Forest Park Avenue and south of Frederick Road as Bloomsbury Avenue. Part of route of bus routes 20 and 77. At one time, was the zone-fare boundary along the Ellicott City Railroad.
Ivy Mill Road	Gores Mill Road to Deer Park Road	Reisterstown		When southbound, Ivy Mill Road starts off Westminster Pike as Gores Mill Road. There are two separate roads called "Gores Mill Road." See Gores Mill Road for more details.

== J ==
Street	Route	Communities	Landmarks	Notes
Johnnycake Road		Catonsville	Johnnycake Town	Johnnycake Road has been split into three parts. The whole of the original road ran on a renamed portion on the 18th-century wagon road, Old Frederick Road.
Jarrettsville Pike	Dulaney Valley Road to Norrisville Road (in Harford County - continues as Madonna Road)	Jacksonville	Ladew Topiary Gardens	
Joppa Road	Falls Road to Philadelphia Road	Riderwood; Towson; Carney; Perry Hall	Greenspring Station; Towson Town Center; Towson Marketplace	One of Baltimore County's main cross-county roads on the north side of the county. Divided in central Towson into West and East Joppa Road. To the west of central Towson, Joppa Road is primarily a two-lane residential road. In Towson, a segment is one-way westbound. To the east of the Towson Circle, it is a four+ lane commercial corridor. At Belair Road, Joppa Road is doglegged, requiring a left and a right one block later to continue on Joppa. Going straight eastbound past Belair Road brings motorists onto Ebenezer Road. Joppa Road east of Belair Road is two lanes. Bus Routes 3, 55, and 60 operate on parts of Joppa Road.

== K ==
Street	Route	Communities	Landmarks	Notes
Kenilworth Drive	Charles Street to Bosley Avenue	Towson	The Shops at Kenilworth	Continues west of Charles Street as Bellona Avenue. West of The Shops at Kenilworth, it is a residential street. East of this point, it is the location of various office and government buildings, including the Baltimore County Detention Center. See this map for details (Street View available).
Kenwood Avenue	Belair Road (in Baltimore City) to Philadelphia Road	Overlea; Rosedale	Overlea High School; BCPL Rosedale branch Golden Ring Middle School	Part of Bus Route 55.

== L ==
Street	Route	Communities	Landmarks	Notes
Lake Avenue	Falls Road to Chinquapin Parkway (in Baltimore city)			See also Lake Avenue entry in List of streets in Baltimore, Maryland
Lakeside Boulevard	Painters Mill Road to Dolfield Road	Owings Mills	New Town High School	
Liberty Road	US-15 (in Frederick) to Swan Drive (in Baltimore city)	Randallstown; Rockdale; Milford Mill; Lochearn		Exit 18 off Baltimore Beltway. Known as Liberty Heights Avenue in Baltimore City.
Loch Raven Boulevard	24th Street (in Baltimore city) to Cromwell Bridge Road	Towson		Exit 29 of Baltimore Beltway
Lyons Mill Road	Liberty Road to Painters Mill Road	Owings Mills; Randallstown	Deer Park Elementary School	

== M ==
Street	Route	Communities	Landmarks	Notes
Manor Road	Old York Road to Glen Arm Road	Phoenix		
Maiden Choice Lane	Frederick Road to Leeds Avenue	Catonsville; Arbutus	Charlestown, Wilkens Beltway Plaza	
Marriottsville Road	Runnymeade Road to Frederick Road (in Howard County)	Owings Mills; Randallstown	Patapsco State Park	Exit 83 off I-70 in Howard County. Transverses 3 counties: Baltimore, Carroll, and Howard.
Martin Boulevard	Pulaski Highway to Chesapeake Park Plaza	Middle River		
McCormick Road	Beaver Dam Road to York Road	Hunt Valley	McCormick Road (Baltimore Light Rail station)	Part of Bus Route 9
McDonogh Road	Reisterstown Road to Liberty Road	Pikesville; Owings Mills; Randallstown	McDonogh School	Continues past Reisterstown Road as Cradock Lane and past Liberty Road as Greens Lane. When traveling northbound between Winands and Lyons Mill Roads, going straight continues onto Painters Mill Road. A right turn is required to continue onto McDonogh Road. McDonogh Road crosses over Interstate 795 and the Baltimore Metro Subway; at this point, a Metro Subway station was once proposed, but was never constructed due to community opposition. Public transportation was also proposed on fought on a different part of McDonogh Road in 2005 when a GBBI plan to extend Bus Route M-8, then the line serving the Liberty Road corridor, to Owings Mills along McDonogh and Painters Mill Roads was opposed by residents of the portion between Liberty and Winands Roads.
Merritt Boulevard	Baltimore Beltway to Sollers Point Road	Dundalk	BCPL North Point branch	Exit 39 off Baltimore Beltway
Metropolitan Boulevard	Rolling Road to Baltimore–Washington International Airport (in Anne Arundel County)	Catonsville, Halethorpe	Southwestern Park & Ride	Becomes Interstate 195 following an interchange with I-95.
Merrymans Mill Road	Poplar Hill Road to Jarrettsville Pike	Cockeysville; Jacksonville		Continuation to Maryland Route 943 (Warren Road), though not designated as such
Middletown Road	Steltz Road to York Road	Parkton		Exit 31 off I-83
Milford Mill Road	Rolling Road to Reisterstown Road	Milford Mill; Pikesville	Milford Mill Academy; Milford Mill Metro Subway Station	Continues as Slade Avenue. A parallel section off Reisterstown Road known as Old Milford Mill Road is part of its original route. There is also an "Old Milford Mill Road" near Liberty Road. Part of route of Bus Routes 52, 54, and 77.
Monkton Road	York Road to Troyer Road	Hereford; Monkton		Route 138 becomes Shepperd Road east of NCRR trail
Mount Carmel Road	Lower Beckleysville Road to York Road	Hereford; Armacost		Exit 27 off I-83
Mount Wilson Lane	Reisterstown Road to dead end	Pikesville	Ner Israel Rabbinical College	

== N ==
Street	Route	Communities	Landmarks	Notes
Nicodemus Road	Ivy Mill Road to Franklin Boulevard	Reisterstown	Baltimore County Police Franklin Precinct; Baltimore Humane Society Cedarmere Elementary School	Nicodemus Road is split into two sections in Baltimore County. Starting at an Intersection with MD 140, Reisterstown Road with Delight Road, and Timber Grove Road. Nicodemus heads west past Cedarmere Elementary School, intersecting in an offset intersection with Cherry Valley Road, where Nicodemus continues and terminates at Franklin Boulevard, via West Cherry Hill Road. On the west side of I795, Nicodemus picks up again at the intersection with Franklin and Red Run Boulevards heading West. 795, Exit 7 (Franklin Boulevard) from the southbound side lets off on Nicodemus. The road intersects Berrymans Lane and carrys on to Ivy Mill Road. The road continues west of Liberty Reservoir as Deer Park Road
North Point Boulevard	Rolling Mill Road (in Baltimore city; continues as Erdman Avenue) to Sparrows Point Road	Dundalk; North Point; Edgemere; Sparrows Point	Eastpoint Mall	Exits 40 and 42 off Baltimore Beltway
North Point Road	Pulaski Highway (in Baltimore City) to Howard Avenue (in Fort Howard, Maryland)	Dundalk; North Point; Edgemere; Sparrows Point; Fort Howard	"Battle Acre" Monument; North Point State Battlefield Park; Sparrows Point High School; North Point State Park; Ft. Howard Veterans Hospital; Fort Howard Park-Baltimore County Parks System	Formerly Maryland Route 20. Stops and restarts several times, with North Point Boulevard being the road used where the historic old North Point Road has been built over and does not exist in certain segments. Pathway followed in September 1814 during War of 1812, by invading British Army attacking Baltimore on land at North Point and heading for eastern fortifications of city at "Loudenschlager's Hill" (later "Hampstead Hill" in modern Patterson Park, near Highlandtown and Canton neighborhoods. Also location of "Bayshore" amusement park in the late 1890s and early 1900s, operated by Baltimore streetcar company at present site of North Point State Park.

== O ==
Street	Route	Communities	Landmarks	Notes
Old Court Road	Joppa Road to Howard County line (continues as Woodstock Road)	Granite; Randallstown; Pikesville; Ruxton	Northwest Hospital; Old Court Middle School; Talmudical Academy of Baltimore; Old Court Metro Station; Beth Tfiloh School; Beth Tfiloh Congregation; Park School	Various parts of this 13-mile road are numbered as Maryland Routes 125 and 133. Initially ends using name "Old Court Road" at Falls Road, where road physically continues as Ruxton Road and intersects with I-83. After this interchange, a left turn continues another short stretch of road known as "Old Court Road," which continues to Joppa Road.
Old Harford Road	North of Cub Hill Road to Harford Road (in Baltimore City)	Carney; Parkville	Cub Hill Fire Tower; Charles Hickey School; Tall Cedars of Lebanon	Part of route of Bus Route 19. Once included part of Cromwell Bridge Road, and all of Glen Arm and Satyr Hill Roads.
Old Pimlico Road	Falls Road to Smith Avenue	Pikesville		From Falls Road, starts out westbound, until a left turn is required to continue on Old Pimlico Road. When going straight at this point, the road changes to Green Summit Road. After this point, the road becomes Pimlico Road at Smith Avenue and continues south into Baltimore City. See this map for details. Once part of route of the now defunct Bus Route M-10.
Old York Road	York Road to Norrisville Road (in Harford County)			Exit 36 off I-83
Osler Drive	Towsontown Boulevard to Stevenson Lane	Towson	Towson University; Sheppard Pratt; St. Joseph Hospital	A short but well-known five-lane road in the Towson area that provides access to the Towson University campus and the entrances to Sheppard Pratt and St. Joseph Hospitals. Part of route of Bus Route 3. Served in the past by bus routes 11 and 55.
Owings Mills Boulevard	Liberty Road to Bond Avenue (continues as Central Avenue)	Owings Mills	Stevenson University Owings Mills campus Maryland Public Television	Exit 4 off I-795. Continues north past Bond Avenue as Central Avenue before ending at Butler Road.

== P ==
Street	Route	Communities	Landmarks	Notes
Padonia Road	Falls Road to Sunnylake Place	Cockeysville	Dulaney High School	Exit 17 off I-83. Continues west of Falls Road as Broadway Road, which ends at Greenspring Avenue. Part of route of Bus Route 9.
Painters Mill Road	Reisterstown Road to McDonogh Road	Owings Mills	Owings Mills Metro Subway Station	Part of route of bus routes 56 and 59.
Paper Mill Road	Ashland Road to Jarrettsville Pike	Hunt Valley; Phoenix	Route 145 Continues east of Jarrettsville Pike as Sweet Air Road	
Park Heights Avenue	Park Circle in Baltimore City to Garrison Forest Road	Pikesville; Owings Mills	Exit 21 of Baltimore Beltway inner loop	
Peninsula Expressway	Merritt Boulevard to Bethlehem Boulevard	Dundalk; Sparrows Point	Exit 43 off Baltimore Beltway	
Pennsylvania Avenue		Towson		One-way pair with Chesapeake Avenue
Perring Parkway	Waltham Woods Road to Hillen Road (in Baltimore City)	Parkville		Exit 30 off Baltimore Beltway. Waltham Woods Road continues north to Cub Hill Road. Perring Parkway continues south to Hillen Road.
Perry Hall Boulevard	Silver Spring Road to Rossville Boulevard	White Marsh; Perry Hall	White Marsh Mall is nearby	Continues south of Rossville Boulevard as Lillian Holt Drive to Kenwood Avenue
Philadelphia Road	Pulaski Highway to Pulaski Highway (in Harford County - continues as Old Philadelphia Road)	Rosedale; Bradshaw	Golden Ring Mall	Exit 34 of Baltimore Beltway
Providence Road	Joppa Road to Loch Raven Drive	Towson		Exit 28 off Baltimore Beltway. Up until 1996, when buses were discontinued, the Maryland Transit Administration operated a park-and-ride near the exit. The south end of the road terminates at Joppa Road East, next to the Public Safety Building and the main offices of Black & Decker.
Pulaski Highway	Fayette Street (in Baltimore City) to Dupont Boulevard (in Delaware)	Rosedale; White Marsh	Golden Ring Plaza	Exit 35 off Baltimore Beltway
Putty Hill Avenue	Hillen Road to Belair Road	Towson; Parkville; Fullerton	Towson Marketplace; Tall Cedars of Lebanon	Part of a long cross-county route from Towson to Essex that appears as a single road. Full route starts as Burke Avenue to Putty Hill. Putty Hill goes straight into Rossville Boulevard at Walther Boulevard. A lesser section of Putty Hill Avenue that runs from Walther Boulevard to Belair Road continues onto Ridge Road.

== R ==
Street	Route	Places	Landmarks	Notes
Red Run Boulevard	Franklin Boulevard to dead end east of Painters Mill Road	Owings Mills; Reisterstown	Owings Mills Town Center	
Reisterstown Road	North Avenue (in Baltimore city) to Caraway Road in Reisterstown	Pikesville; Owings Mills; Reisterstown		Continues north as Main Street before Route 140 continues to Westminster and going straight continues onto Maryland Route 30
Ridgely Road	Dulaney Valley Road to dead end	Timonium	Lutherville Light Rail Stop	
Rolling Road	Old Court Road to Frederick Road; Frederick Road to Selford Road	Milford Mill; Windsor Mill; Woodlawn; Catonsville	Old Court Middle School; Security Square Mall; CCBC Catonsville	There are a few sections of Rolling Road. The northern section is from Old Court Road to Frederick Road, with the section from Security Boulevard to Frederick Road being called N. Rolling Road. This is not numbered. The next section, which is known as Maryland Route 166, is from Frederick Road about ½ mile east to the Southwest Park-and-Ride. It is just south of here that the road splits into Selford Road and Metropolitan Boulevard. Metropolitan Boulevard leads to I-195 toward BWI Airport. There is another small road called "Rolling Road" in the Arbutus area; this was once known as Maryland Route 466. The two latter sections are called S. Rolling Road.
Rosewood Lane	Reisterstown Road to Garrison Forest Road	Owings Mills	Rosewood Center	Access road to the now defunct Rosewood Center
Rossville Boulevard	Walther Boulevard to Stemmers Run Road	Fullerton; Rosedale	CCBC Essex Campus	Part of a long cross-county route from Towson to Essex that appears as a single road. Full route starts off Bosley Avenue, then continues as Burke Avenue to Putty Hill. Putty Hill goes straight into Rossville Boulevard at Walther Boulevard. Rossville Boulevard ends at a junction in which Stemmers Run Road is to the left, and Mace Avenue to the right. A stub of Rossville Boulevard never extended beyond exists as a park 'n ride lot.
Ruxton Road	Falls Road to Bellona Avenue	Ruxton		Exit 12 off I-83. Continues west of Falls Road as Old Court Road.

== S ==
Street	Route	Communities	Landmarks	Notes
Sacred Heart Lane	Butler Road to Walgrove Road	Reisterstown; Glyndon		
Security Boulevard	CMS complex west of Greengage Road to the city line (near Forest Park Avenue) where it continues as Cooks Lane	Woodlawn	Security Square Mall; Social Security Administration headquarters	Exit 17 off Baltimore Beltway and exit 94 off I-70. Continues as Cooks Lane in Baltimore City. Served by bus routes 15, 40, 44, 57, and 77.
Seminary Avenue	Falls Road to Providence Road	Lutherville	St. Paul's School	
Seven Mile Lane	Old Court Road to Reisterstown Road (continues as Colonial Road)	Pikesville	Pikesville Middle School; Seven Mile Market; Suburban Orthodox Synagogue	
Shawan Road	Falls Road to York Road	Cockeysville; Hunt Valley	Hunt Valley Town Center; Hunt Valley Light Rail Stop; Oregon Ridge Park	Exit 20 off I-83
Slade Avenue	Seven Mile Lane to dead end past Military Avenue	Pikesville	Baltimore Hebrew Congregation	Part of a longer road that is physically one road including Milford Mill Road, Slade Avenue, and Smith Avenue. This full road runs from a dead end slightly past Rolling Road to the Mt. Washington Light Rail Stop.
Smith Avenue	Seven Mile Lane to Mt. Washington Light Rail Stop	Pikesville	Pikesville Senior High School; Wellwood International School; Greenspring Shopping Center	Part of a longer road that is physically one road including Milford Mill Road, Slade Avenue, and Smith Avenue. This full road runs from a dead end slightly past Rolling Road to the Mt. Washington Light Rail Stop.
Sollers Point Road	Holabird Avenue to Main Street	Dundalk	CCBC Dundalk campus	Part of route of bus routes 4, and 10.
Southeast Freeway/Boulevard	Baltimore Beltway to Back River Neck Road	Essex		Exit 36 off Baltimore Beltway. Is a limited-access highway known as "Southeast Freeway" until Old Eastern Avenue, where it becomes "Southeast Boulevard."
Southwestern Boulevard	Wilkens Avenue (in Baltimore City) to Washington Boulevard	Arbutus; Halethorpe	Halethorpe MARC Rail Station	Part of US Route 1. Exit 12-A off Baltimore Beltway (from outer loop only). Has entrance to inner loop only via Leeds Avenue.
Stevenson Lane	Charles Street to Brook Road	Rodgers Forge; Towson		Part of route of bus routes 3 and 11.
Stevenson Road	Old Court Road to Wiltonwood Road	Pikesville; Stevenson	Chizuk Amuno Congregation	Exit 21 off outer loop of Baltimore Beltway, shared with Park Heights Avenue
Sudbrook Lane/Sudbrook Road	Rockridge Road to Old Court Road	Sudbrook Park; Pikesville	One-lane bridge	North of Milford Mill Road it is known as Sudbrook Lane. South of Milford Mill Road it is known as Sudbrook Road. East of Reisterstown Road it is known as E. Sudbrook Lane.
Sulphur Spring Road	Selford Road to Washington Boulevard	Arbutus	BCPL Arbutus branch	Exit 11 off Baltimore Beltway from outer loop. Exit 11 is mainly one of the two interchanges between the Beltway and I-95, but also has a ramp leading to this road from the outer loop. This exit is used for reaching Washington Boulevard, which does not have an exit ramp from the outer loop.
Sweet Air Road	Jarrettsville Pike to Baldwin Mill Road	Jacksonville		

== T ==
Street	Route	Communities	Landmarks	Notes
Timonium Road	Mays Chapel Road to Dulaney Valley Road	Timonium		Exit 16 off I-83
Thornton Road	West Joppa Road to West Timonium Road	Towson	Riderwood Elementary School	
Towsontown Boulevard	Charles Street to Fairmount Avenue	Towson	Towson University	A four-lane road that runs from Charles Street to Fairmount Avenue, mostly used for thru traffic in this area, and also the northern boundary to the Towson University campus. After Fairmount Avenue, it continues as Hillen Road, a two lane road. See this map for details. Served by Bus Route 11.
Tufton Avenue	Greenspring Avenue to Falls Road	Reisterstown		Continues east of Falls Road as Shawan Road

== W ==
Street	Route	Communities	Landmarks	Notes
Walther Boulevard	Joppa Road to Rossville Boulevard (continues as Rolling Crest Way)	Perry Hall		See also similarly named Walther Avenue in Baltimore City
Warren Road	I-83 to Poplar Hill Road (continues as Merrymans Mill Road	Cockeysville	Warren Road Light Rail Stop	Exit 18 off I-83 (accessible from northbound only). Part of route of Bus Route 9.
Washington Avenue	York Road to Towsontown Boulevard	Towson		
Washington Boulevard	Dover Street to near Cherry Lane (in Prince George's County)	Halethorpe		Exit 10 off Baltimore Beltway. Is US-1 ALT from city line to Southwestern Boulevard and US-1 south of Southwestern Boulevard. Served by bus routes 35, 36, and 77.
White Marsh Boulevard	Baltimore Beltway to Eastern Boulevard	Fullerton; White Marsh; Middle River	White Marsh Town Center	Exit 31C off Baltimore Beltway and Exit 67 off I-95. Part of route of Bus Route 15.
Wilkens Avenue	Rolling Road to Gilmor Street (in Baltimore City)	Catonsville; Arbutus	UMBC; Spring Grove State Hospital	Exit 12-BC off Baltimore Beltway. Designated as MD-372 from west end at Rolling Road to Southwestern Boulevard in Baltimore City, where it becomes part of US-1 up until Fulton Avenue.
Winands Road	Deer Park Road to Old Court Road	Randallstown	Randallstown High School; WBAL-AM towers	
Windsor Mill Road	Inwood Road to Clifton Avenue (in Baltimore City)	Windsor Mill; Woodlawn	Windsor Mill Middle School; Kernan Hospital	Part of route of Bus Route 77.
Wise Avenue	Merritt Boulevard to North Point Boulevard	Dundalk; Edgemere	Patapsco High School	Continues west of Merritt Boulevard as Holabird Avenue. Served by Bus Route 4.
Woodlawn Drive	Gwynn Oak Avenue to Johnnycake Road	Woodlawn	Social Security Administration headquarters Woodlawn High School; BCPL Woodlawn branch	Continues past Johnnycake Road as Crosby Road
Worthington Avenue	Butler Road to Tufton Avenue	Reisterstown		To the west, continues as Butler Road. To the east, continues as Greenspring Avenue.

== Y ==
Street	Route	Communities	Landmarks	Notes
York Road	42nd Street (in Baltimore city) to Mason–Dixon line (continues as Susquehanna Trail)	Towson; Lutherville; Timonium; Cockeysville; Sparks; Hereford; Parkton; Maryland Line	Towson University; BCPL Towson branch Towson Commons; Timonium Fairgrounds	Starts in Baltimore City as Greenmount Avenue. Becomes Susquehanna Trail in Pennsylvania. Served by Bus Route 8 south of Ridgely Road (also bus routes 12 and 48 south of Towson) and Bus Route 9 on parts of the road north of Ridgely Road.

== See also ==
- List of streets in Baltimore, Maryland
