= Towson Town Center =

Shopping mall in Baltimore County, Maryland, U.S.

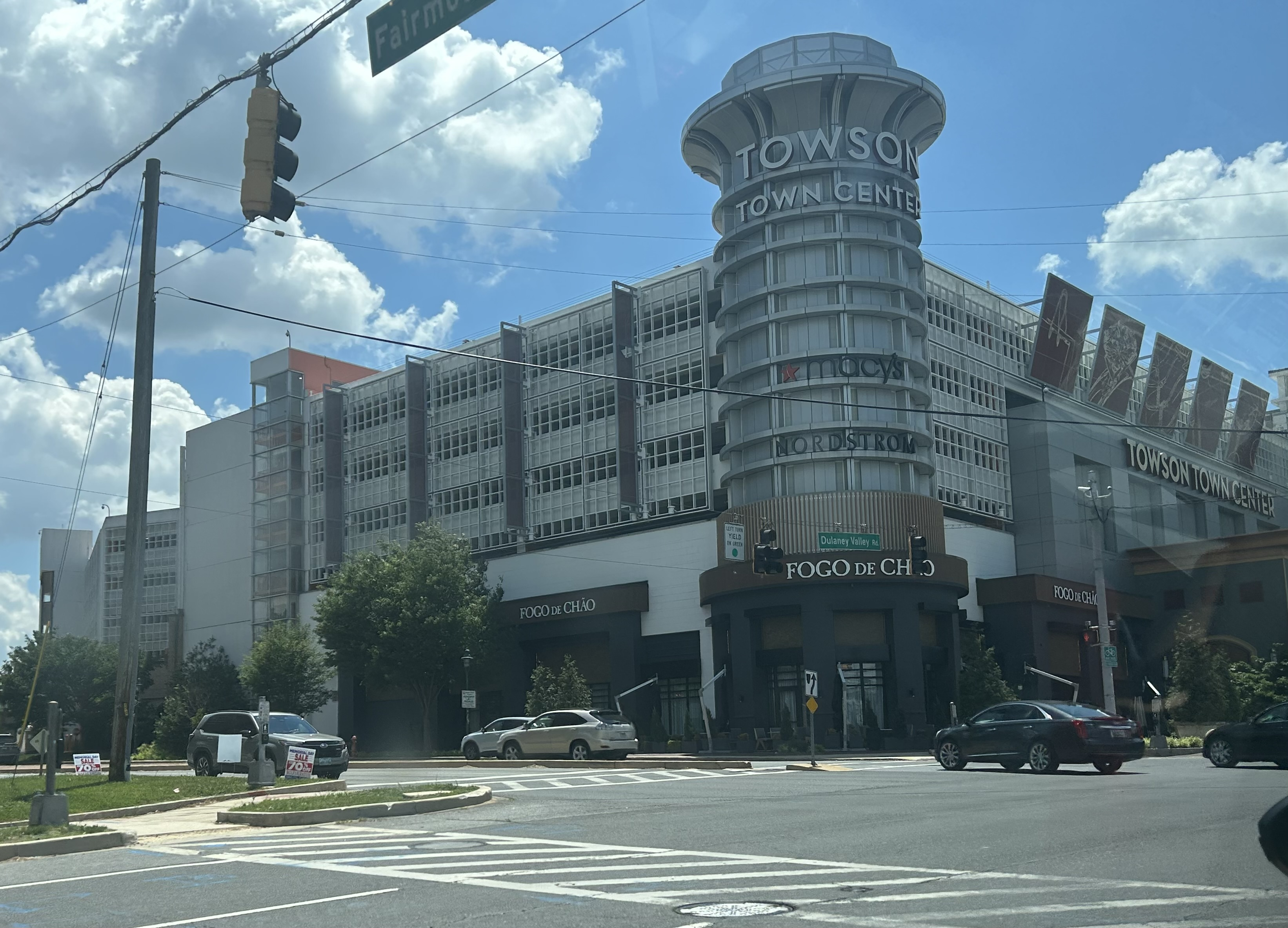
- Exterior view (June 2026)
- Location: Towson, Maryland, United States
- Coordinates: 39°24′14″N 76°35′58″W
- Address: 825 Dulaney Valley Road, 21024
- Opened: May 13, 1959; 67 years ago (original Towson Plaza, enclosed 1973); October 1991; 35 years ago (1990s renovation)
- Renovated: 1973; 1982; 1991; 2008; 2016
- Previous names: Towson Plaza (1959–1973); Towsontowne Centre (1973–1991)
- Developer: DeChiaro Properties
- Manager: GGP
- Owner: GGP
- Num. of stores: 210+ (at peak; 150 remaining)
- Num. of anchor tenants: 3 (2 open, 1 vacant)
- Floor area: 1,025,090 square feet (95,234 m^{2})
- Floors: 2 (original Towson Plaza); 4 (since 1991 renovation, 3 in Macy's)
- Parking: Lighted lot, 4400 spaces, and four 7-story parking garages
- Public transit: MTA Maryland bus: 36, 51, 52, 93, CityLink Green, CityLink Red
- Website: www.towsontowncenter.com
- Building details
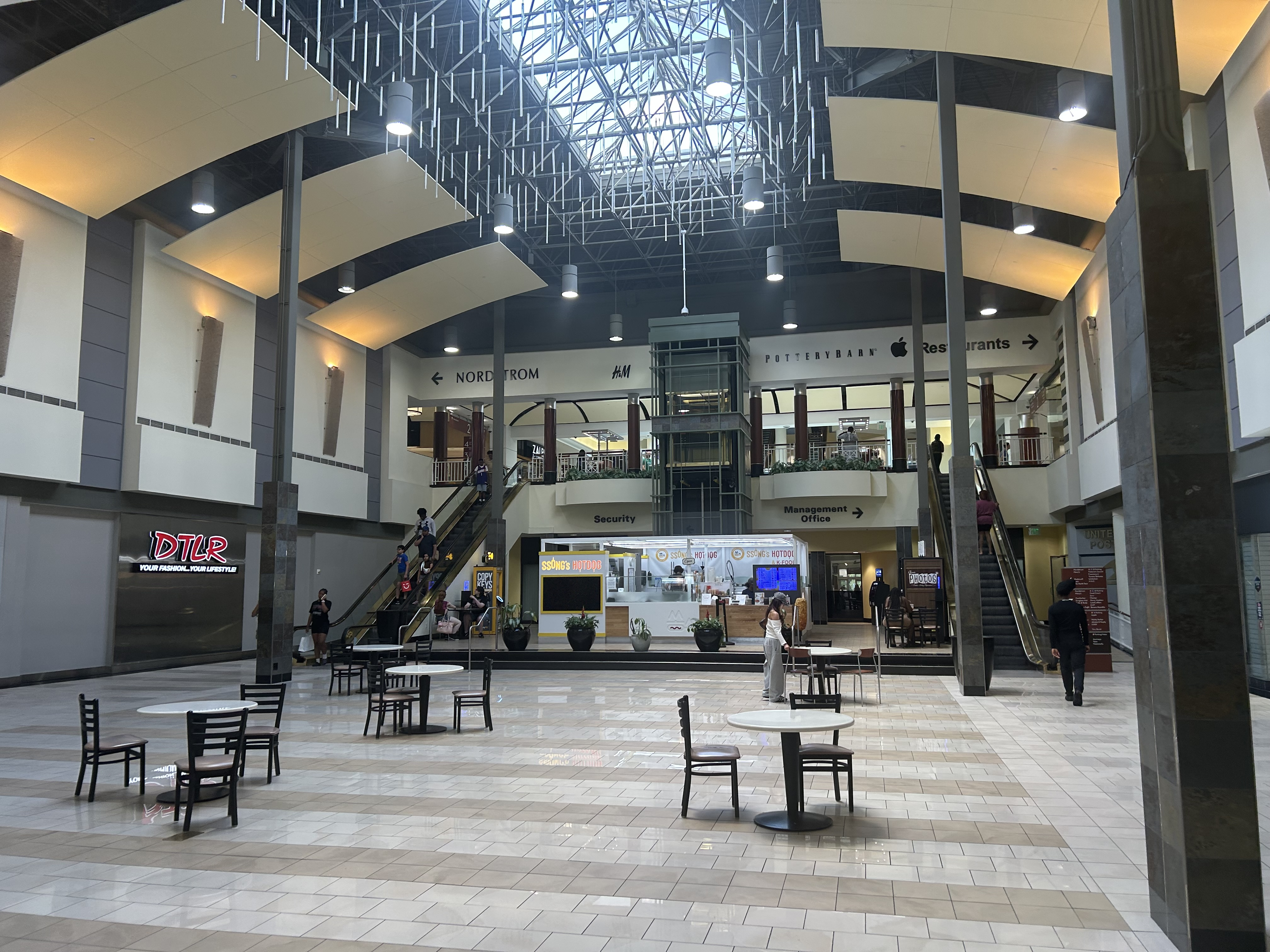
- Center court (June 2026)

General information
- Status: Operational

Renovating team
- Architect: RTKL Associates
- Renovating firm: The Hahn Company; DeChiaro-Rachuba; Santa Anita Realty
- Main contractor: NuHahn Construction

Towson Town Center is a super-regional shopping mall located in Towson, Maryland. It was the largest indoor shopping mall in Maryland prior to the completion of Arundel Mills in November 2000 in Hanover and the 2007 expansion of Annapolis Mall.

As of August 2018, the mall is owned and managed by GGP, a subsidiary of BGRE (formerly Brookfield Properties). As of December 2025, the property had begun to struggle with vacancies and crime, and as of April 2026, the mall is 74% occupied.

== History ==
=== Background ===
Towson Town Center originally operated under the name Towson Plaza, which was an open-air shopping center developed by Ralph DeChiaro of DeChiaro Properties on ground originally sold by Goucher College. The mall had its grand opening on May 13, 1959, and was built adjacent to the Towson location of Hutzler's, which permanently closed in January 1990 and was redeveloped into Towson Circle. Towson Plaza was one of the earliest multi-level shopping centers. Much of that original structure remains incorporated into the current mall as its two lower levels.

=== 1973 expansion and 1982 renovation ===
Towson Plaza was enclosed in 1973, renamed Towsontowne Centre, and renovated in 1982 with the opening of Hecht's in September of that year across the parking lot. Lawrence Rachuba, through DeChiaro-Rachuba Group, were the developers. The renovation also led to the opening of Hutzler's, though it gone out of business in 1990.

Over the years, stores and attractions were added on to increase traffic in the mall and make it more competitive with other malls in the area. One memorable effort was Gadgets restaurant and arcade. It was a Warner Bros. themed restaurant with animatronic characters performing periodic shows on stage, which opened and closed in the early 1980s. Some of the original stores survived this era but later closed, including Hess Shoe Store, Loewmeyer's, and Friendly's. The Level 1 center court featured the Garden Cafe and a dandelion fountain at its entrance. The glass elevator was installed between the old escalators.

=== 1990s redevelopment ===
Towson Town Center underwent a massive $150 million renovation and reconstruction in the early 1990s. The third and fourth floors were developed by the San Diego, California-based Hahn Company (later TrizecHahn Corporation), in partnership with the Rachuba-DeChiaro Group and the California-based Santa Anita Realty, opening on October 14, 1991. It included the addition of the Arbor Terrace food court on Level 3. New fountains were added to the Nordstrom court and third floor courts along with a glass elevator connecting Levels 3 and 4. The upper floors sit above a parking garage while access to the lower levels form a downhill pattern, as much of the mall property was built on a slope. The 1990s renovation was designed by the Baltimore-based RTKL Associates, which also designed the competing Owings Mills Mall and White Marsh Mall. The 1991 renovation added significant space for 130 stores.

In May 1992, it was reported that the Garden Cafe had problems regarding extremely slow service, an overly ambitious menu, and poorly prepared food. During the 1991 renovation, the main fountain was replaced with a smaller one, and in 1999, the popular theme restaurant, Rainforest Cafe opened in the mall. The Garden Cafe closed its doors in early 2000, and was replaced with Bistro Sensations, which opened in April of that year.

=== 1998–2019: Further redevelopment and ownership changes ===
TrizecHahn Corporation sold Towson Town Center to the Columbia-based Rouse Company in 1998 as part of a $1.1 billion deal, alongside other malls to Rouse and Westfield Group as part of TrizecHahn's exit out of the mall industry. The Rouse Company and its portfolio, including Towson Town Center, was acquired by the Chicago, Illinois-based General Growth Properties (GGP) in November 2004 for $12.6 billion. On February 18, 2005, a local private school teacher was murdered in the Towson Town Center parking garage during an attempted armed robbery. Two men were convicted in relation to the killing. John Edward Kennedy Jr. pleaded guilty to first degree murder and was sentenced to life without parole. Javon Clark was convicted of attempted armed robbery and was sentenced to 20 years in prison.

In September 2006, the mall's Hecht's was rebranded Macy's after Federated Department Stores brought May Department Stores. In September 2007, Towson Town Center began a $76 million expansion and renovation project that added to the existing structure, being its largest expansion since 1992. The project included renovations to the mall's first and second floors, parking, restaurants, and a "Main Street"-style facade with exterior shopping, which was largely completed in October 2008. The project included a flagship Crate & Barrel store, P.F. Chang's China Bistro, The Cheesecake Factory (opened October 23, 2008), Stoney River Steakhouse & Grill, and T.G.I. Friday's. Rainforest Cafe permanently shut down on January 11, 2009, as GGP explicitly bought out the lease from Landry's Restaurants, Inc..

On December 19, 2011, a man was shot and killed outside a service entrance to Nordstrom in a targeted gang murder. Three men were convicted of first degree murder while a fourth man accepted a plea deal in exchange for testifying against the other three. Just after Christmas in 2015, a crowd of over a hundred teenagers caused a disruption at the mall, throwing rocks at police and pushing shopping carts into parked cars. In September 2016, the mall instituted a juvenile curfew on Fridays and Saturdays. In November 2016, Towson Town Center began another multi-million dollar renovation to its four parking garages. This involved the addition of Park assist technology. A "Park Assist" system alerts customers to available parking spaces through overhead red and green lights. According to owner General Growth Properties at the time, they also remodeled mall entrances, enclosed bridges from parking decks to the center, enhanced lighting and updated signage, adding 1,600 standardized signs, including at all major entrances. A more strict juvenile curfew was temporarily put in place for the holiday season in 2016.

In July 2017, Radcliffe Jewelers announced that they were relocating to a 5,700 sq ft (530 m^{2}) space at the undergoing redevelopment Shops at Kenilworth after 38 years in Towson Town Center, as its lease was not renewed. GGP and its assets, including Towson Town Center, was acquired by the New York-based Brookfield Properties in August 2018. Mall management took over 11 individual tenant spaces to build out a massive 53,000 sq ft (4,900 m^{2}) footprint for Round1 Bowling & Arcade, which opened on December 7, 2019.

=== 2021–present: Decline ===
In December 2021, Crate & Barrel announced that it would leave in February 2022; it closed permanently and has remained vacant ever since. Fogo de Chão announced an opening at Towson Town Center in September 2023, which would replace the defunct P.F. Changs. Local news outlets brought attention to the location, causing it to be a successful addition to the shopping center during its decline.

In December 2025, Tommy Bahama, Madewell, Banana Republic, and Wockenfuss Candies all announced that they were leaving; all four stores closed their doors by January 2026. A survey of customers by WBAL-TV highlighted changing consumer habits and crime as reasons for the departure of stores from the mall. In April 2026, the Apple Store then announced the closure of its location on June 20, 2026, a store whose staff has been unionized and represented by IAM CORE since the summer of 2024.

On April 21, 2026, Stoney River Steakhouse & Grill announced that it would permanently close its doors on June 26, 2026, affecting 68 employees. As a result, shoppers have warned Brookfield Properties to "adapt or risk more closures." As of April 2026, the mall is 26% vacant, with approximately 40 storefronts empty. Coach closed on June 24, 2026.

== Gallery ==
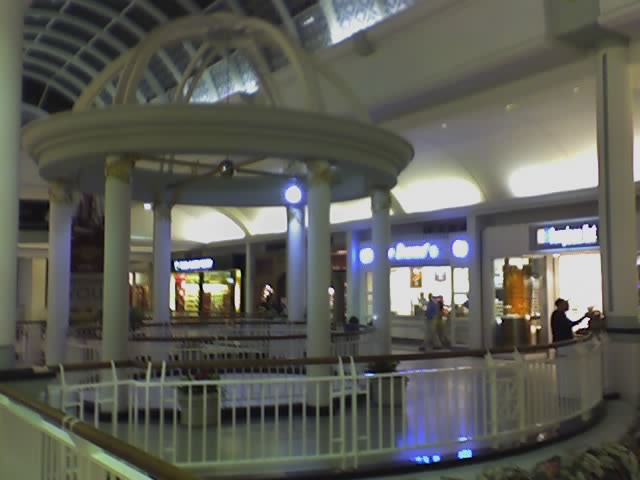
Interior view (January 2008)

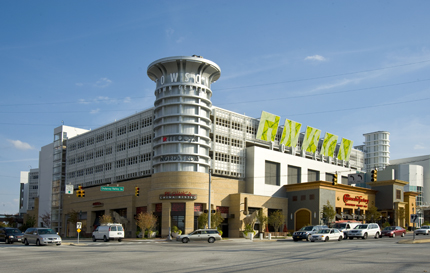
The property prior to the November 2016 renovation (July 2010)

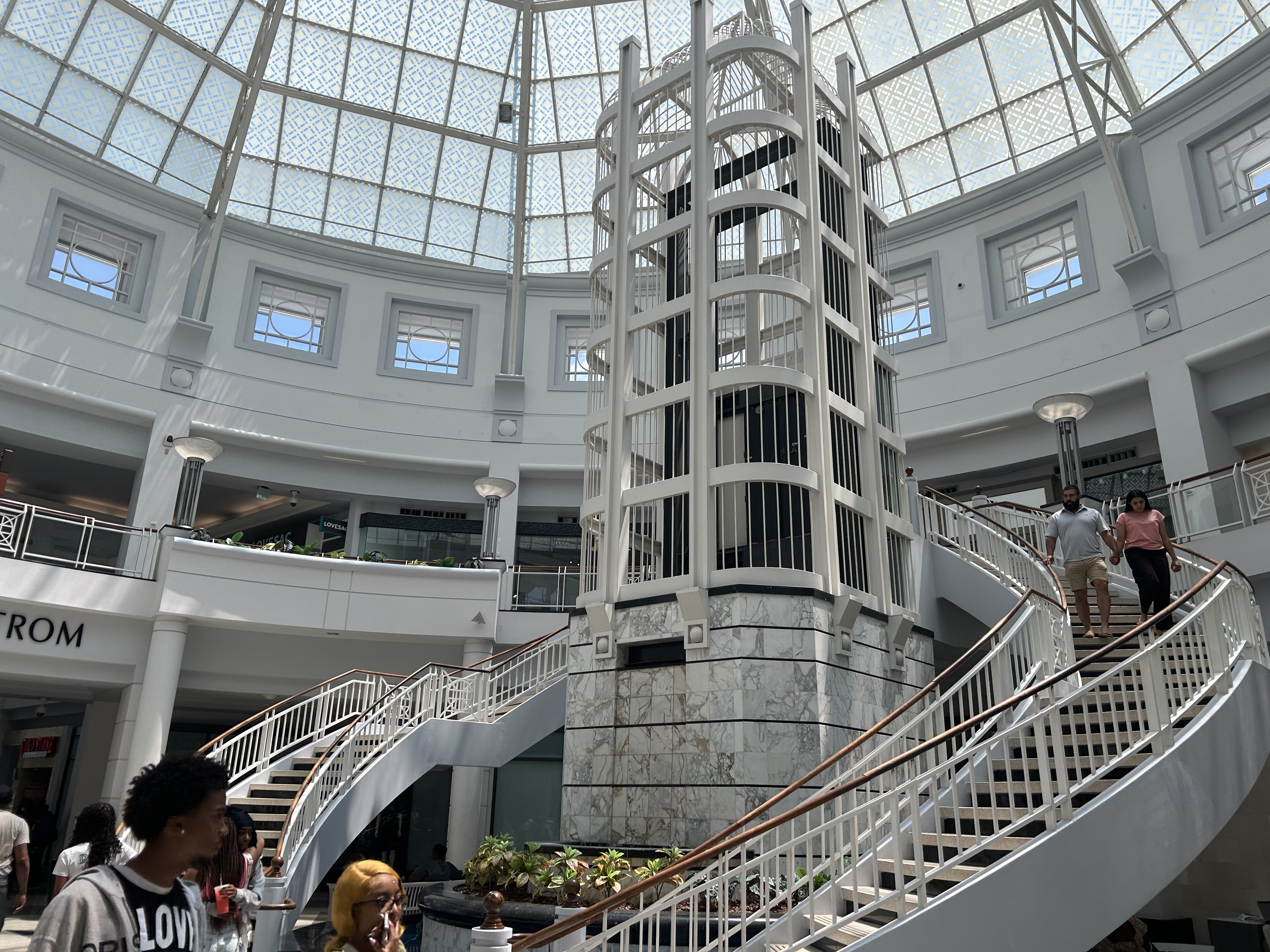
Spiral staircase (June 2026)

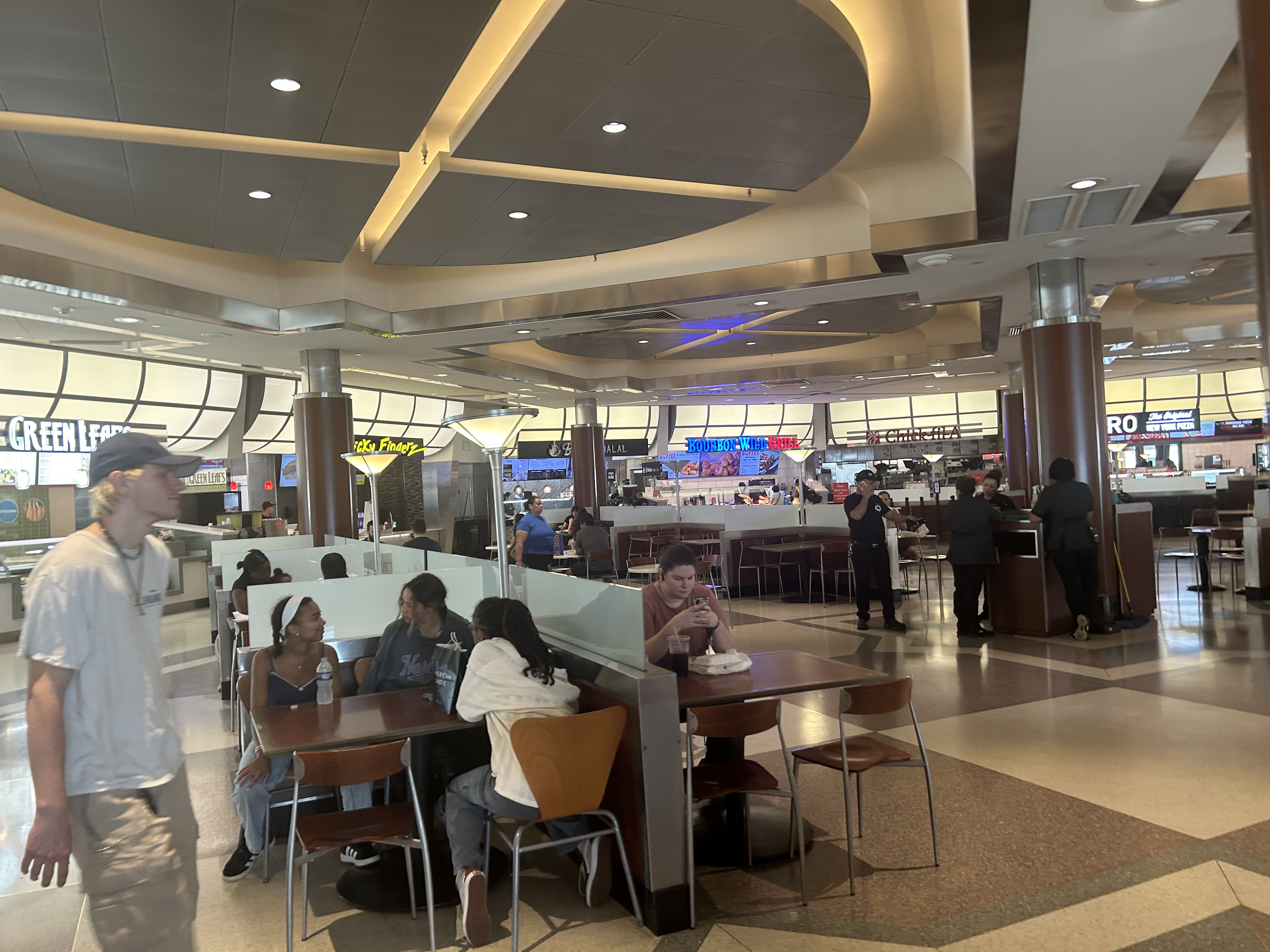
Third-floor food court (June 2026)

Exterior view of The Cheesecake Factory at night (August 2026)
