= North Point Road =

- A road in Baltimore County, Maryland, United States; see List of roads in Baltimore County
- A road in North Point, on Hong Kong Island, Hong Kong
