= Baltimore Public Library =

Baltimore Public Library can refer to:

- Enoch Pratt Free Library, the public library system of the city of Baltimore, Maryland
- Baltimore County Public Library, the public library system of Baltimore County, Maryland
