= BCPL (disambiguation) =

BCPL is a programming language. It may also refer to:

- Baltimore County Public Library, a public library in the state of Maryland
- British Columbia Premier League, a Canadian soccer league
- Wisconsin Board of Commissioners of Public Lands, a Wisconsin state agency
