= Hubert Simmons =

American baseball player

- Pitcher / Outfielder
- Born: May 19, 1924; Tarboro, North Carolina
- Died: July 8, 2009 (aged 85); Baltimore, Maryland
- Batted: Right Threw: Right

Teams
- Baltimore Elite Giants (1950)

Hubert Van Wike Simmons (May 19, 1924 – July 8, 2009) was an American Negro league baseball pitcher and outfielder. He batted and threw right handed.

It is documented that Simmons could play all nine positions in baseball. Nevertheless, he was primarily a curveball pitcher that later established his reputation for his nasty knuckleball.

== Early life ==
During his life, Simmons was considered to be an engaging individual, readily willing to share his experiences, talking to adults as well as kids, both African-Americans and white, about playing professional baseball and participating voluntarily in social activities.

Simmons was born and raised in Tarboro, North Carolina. He grew up watching the likes of Soup Campbell, Snake Henry and Buster Maynard playing with the Class-D Tarboro Serpents at what was then called Bryan Park. Simmons had dreamed of playing on that same field since age seven, but segregation stood ominously in his path. At the time, it was a white park, with only white ball teams playing there. Neverthelees, Simmons learned to play baseball and watched games at the ballpark, which had separate seating for black people.

After years of using foul balls as his golden ticket into Bryan Park, the teenager Simmons met a groundskeeper that allowed him to shine baseball shoes, and rake the basepaths and the field, which allowed Simmons to watch free the games of his local team.

== Baseball career ==
Because his high school did not have a baseball team, Simmons just played sandlot ball and in Boy Scout games around his hometown. After graduating from high school in 1941, he joined the Civilian Conservation Corps (CCC), a public work relief program established by President Franklin D. Roosevelt that operated from 1933 to 1942. Simmons was relocated to Raleigh, North Carolina, where he joined the Raleigh Tigers, a semipro team managed by legendary William 'Bill' Foster.

Simmons spent his time with the Tigers from 1941 to 1942. Afterwards, he continued playing baseball for several teams through 1949, even while serving in the U.S. Army during World War II from 1943 to 1945 and later while attending college at A&T State in Greensboro, North Carolina, between 1946 and 1949.

In between, Simmons served in Europe with the Quartermaster Corps, arriving on the beaches of Normandy landings in June 1944 during the D-Day invasion. Discharged with the rank of sergeant at the end of the war, Simmons attended A&T, where he earned a bachelor's degree in business administration in 1950. While a student at A&T, he was a member of three championship teams and twice made the all-conference team.

In addition to the Raleigh Tigers, Simmons played for the Greensboro Red Wings (1946-1948), Farley Stars (1948), Asheville Blues (1949), and finally with the Baltimore Elite Giants of the Negro American League in 1950, in what would be the final season of the storied franchise. Simmons won one game in three pitching appearances for the Elites. After that, he played from 1951 to 1952 for the all-black Yokely Stars, an independent club based in Baltimore, Maryland.

== Life after Baseball ==
After retiring from baseball, Simmons settled in Baltimore and worked for the Social Security Administration and the U.S. Post Office before becoming a city school teacher in 1954. He then taught business at Northwestern High School and was appointed department chairman in 1975. He retired in 1984 after 30 years of service in the Baltimore City Public School System. In his spare time, he coached baseball at the Little League, high school and college levels for more than 40 years.

Simmons later owned SimmonsInk, The Logo Specialists, an advertising specialties business, and opened a small sportswear retail store, Simmons Inc., specialized in customized clothing and uniforms for teams, churches, schools and fraternal organizations.

In 1978, Simmons gained induction into the North Carolina A&T State University Sports Hall of Fame. Thereafter, he was recognized by the Mayor of the City of Baltimore for Outstanding Community Service. For years, he also participated in the Baltimore Orioles' FanFest, being honored in 2004 by throwing out the first pitch at an Orioles home game.

Prior to the 2008 MLB draft, the Los Angeles Angels of Anaheim selected Simmons as a pitcher in the special draft of the surviving Negro league players. Baseball Hall of Fame player Dave Winfield hatched the idea to have this draft, which allowed the MLB teams each select a former NLB player to rectify and recognize those ballplayers who did not have the opportunity to play in the major leagues on the basis of race.

A few days later, the tireless Simmons, along with his wife Audrey L. Simmons and good friend Rayner Banks, gathered a group of relatives, friends, and acquaintances to meet and discuss plans for the development of a Negro Leagues Baseball Museum in Baltimore. The timing was perfect as there was a rise in interest surrounding the Negro leagues and its ball players after the Special Draft. As a result, the Negro Leagues Baseball Museum of Maryland Inc. (NLBMM) became incorporated in the State of Maryland and was recognized by the Internal Revenue Service as a non-profit, charitable corporation in September 2008.

Soon after, Simmons continued a normal life until he suddenly became ill. He died on July 8, 2009, in Baltimore at the age of 85. At the time of his death, he was the last surviving player of the Baltimore Elite Giants.

== Legacy ==
On March 27, 2014, Baltimore County officials, former Negro league baseball players and fans formally unveiled the Hubert V. Simmons Museum of Negro Leagues Baseball (SMNLB) in the Owings Mills branch of the Baltimore County Public Library to honor Simmons. The previously named Negro Leagues Baseball Museum of Maryland Inc. had been housed in various temporary locations until the county offered to give it a permanent home in the newly founded BCPL branch.
