= Stanstock Music Festival =

Festival near Baltimore, Maryland, US

- Wooden plaque of Stanstock logo
- Genre: Rock and roll
- Location: Baltimore, MD
- Years active: 2013–2019, 2021–
- Founders: Stan Gibson
- Website: http://www.stanstock.org

The Stanstock Music Festival is a charitable event where multiple musical acts come together and play music to raise money for other nonprofit organizations, especially those that contribute toward pediatric cancer causes and veteran reintegration. The event is held near Baltimore, Maryland - most recently in Essex, and formerly in Parkville. The festival is overseen by Stanstock, Inc., a 501(c)(3) nonprofit charitable organization, with all staff and musicians working free of charge. It is unrelated to the Stanstock Music Festivals held in 2010 and 2011 in Chanhassen, MN.

== History ==
Stanstock Music Festival and Stanstock, Inc. were originally envisioned by Stan Gibson, a former musician local to the Baltimore, Maryland area. As a youth and in his younger adult life, Gibson played instruments such as saxophone and flute in various local Baltimore bands from the late 1960s through 1980s. Gibson and his bands performed at multiple clubs, school dances, private parties, fairs, and weddings, usually playing covers of popular music of the day. While most of Gibson's interactions were with musicians local to Baltimore, he had the opportunity to meet John Denver on the Kerby Scott Show, where Gibson and his band Sindicate secured a gig in 1971.

As he aged, a congenital birth defect led to his being unable to continue playing instruments, as well as other declines in his health. Gibson eventually decided to start a Facebook page called Baltimore Bands of the 70's 80's 90's (sic) in 2012 to reconnect with other musicians. As of September 2019, the page has over 8,000 members. As the membership of the page increased, Gibson decided to organize and collaborate with its members to host a musical event to benefit other charities. The nonprofit Stanstock, Inc. was established, with the first Stanstock Music Festival held in 2013, and has occurred annually since, with the exception of the year 2020 during the COVID-19 coronavirus pandemic.

=== Beneficiaries ===
Stanstock, Inc. raises money through business sponsorship, online donations, raffles held on-site, sale of themed merchandise, and ticket sales for the Stanstock Music Festival.

In recent years, two charities received money from the Stanstock Music Festival:

- The Nicole Van Horn Foundation: This charity raises funding for research and services regarding pediatric cancer, and
- The Catch a Lift Fund: Catch a Lift provides gym memberships and equipment to help veterans rehabilitate and reintegrate into civilian life.

In 2014, the Wounded Warrior Project was also a financially benefiting charity.

Stanstock has additionally served as a platform for the Maryland 9/11 Rolling Memorial, which honors Marylanders who died on September 11, 2001, and soldiers who have since died in wars following the terrorist attacks on the United States.

== Awards and recognition ==
Stanstock, Inc. and its founder, Stan Gibson, have received awards in recognition of its efforts to raise funding for pediatric cancer and also veteran rehabilitation. On September 20, 2015, Gibson was inducted into the Maryland Entertainment Hall of Fame, and received a Maryland Music Award for Outstanding Sponsorship in 2016. A Baltimore, Maryland author has also dedicated three of his books in part to Gibson.

The festival has received fanfare from newspapers, radio, and television.

== Musical acts ==
Musical Acts Performing By Year
Dates	Artists	Venue
2013 Saturday, October 5 Sunday, October 6	Sugarjack, Four Star Revue, Hung Jury, Great Train Robbery, Leather & Lace, Harlan County Kings, Chelsea Graveyard, Collage, Turn Blue, Tim Flaherty, Woody Lissauer, Black Falls, Bottle of Blues, Miller Brothers Band, Bite the Bullet, James Offie Band, Tall in the Saddle, Crossfire, Chuggalug, Rob Fahey & the Pieces, Legendary Doolittle Boys, Core, UXO, Fabtastic Four, Appaloosa, Pulp Fiction, Tony Sciuto, Rat Pack, Scott Kilroy Project, Fred Tepper Band, Dave DeMarco Band, Eclipse featuring Mike Cashman, Russ Steele w/Mark Towles, The Bristols, Black Velvet Moon, Caught Redhanded, The Front, Ed Neenan, Cecilia Strakna, & Charm City Reactors.	McAvoy's of Parkville; Parkville, Maryland, U.S.A.
2014 Saturday, November 1 Sunday, November 2	Harlan County Kings, Spiral, The Jury, Dead Eye Stare, Tommy Vann, Rob Fahey & the Pieces, Awaken, Dave DeMarco Band, Elements of Design, Legend, Patty Reese Band, R.A.T. Pack, Slim Jimmy Band, Jam Sandwich, Leather and Lace, Carey Ziegler's Expensive Hobby, Rosabella, Code Red, US, Never Never, Fabtastic Four, Mantrum, Time Will Tell, Great Train Robbery, Hectic Red, The Luthervillains, Tall in the Saddle, The Uncommitted, & Eclipse.	Timonium State Fairgrounds Exhibition Hall; Timonium, Maryland, U.S.A.
2015 Friday, October 16 Saturday, October 17	Dirty Purple, Russ Greene Band, The Kelly Bell Band, Frank Moran (Blind Wind), Underground Deluxe, Eliza Doering & the Penny Black, The Jury, Caffeine, Project In Fidelity, The Gigs, Bottle of Blues, Luthervillains, Rob Fahey & the Pieces, Leather & Lace, Foreplay, Harlan County Kings, Mark Bray & the Steel Soul Cowboys, Mantrum, Blue Shine Band, Fred Tepper Band, Tommy Vann & the Boss Band, The 1974, Rat Pack, Dave DeMarco Band, SG19, Code Red, The New Romance, & Chelsea Graveyard.	McAvoy's of Parkville; Parkville, Maryland, U.S.A.
2016 Saturday, September 10 Sunday, September 11	Blind Wind, Blue Octane, Mark Bray, Chelsea Graveyard, Crack the Sky, Dirty Purple, E. Joseph & the Phantom Heart, Face Dancer, Rob Fahey & the Pieces, Foreplay, Funktionality, Great Train Robbery, Heads Up, The Jury, Midnight Cargo, Midnite Run, Panama Rex, Project In Fidelity, Rat Pack, Real Geniuses, Rhythm Surf Monkeys, SG19, Slim Jimmy, Synful Pleasure, Taboo Tattoo, Tommy Vann, Turn Blue, Under the Radar, Underground, & Carey Ziegler.	McAvoy's of Parkville; Parkville, Maryland, U.S.A.
2017 Saturday, September 9 Sunday, September 10	Route 66 Band, Surreal, Strait Shooter, Midnight Cargo, E. Joseph & The Phantom Heart, Foreplay, Radio Monkey, Funktionality, The Mark Bray Band, Midnite Run, Fred Tepper Band, Taboo Tattoo, Iron Men, Rob Fahey & The Pieces, No Drama, The Detours, 1974, Slim Jimmy, The Rat Pack, Cheyenne Canyon, Cold Gin KISS Tribute Band, Eclipse, Jacked Up, The Ordeal, G. Michaels Band, LP & the 45's, Deni Starr, Chuggalug, Rhythm Surf Monkeys, Never Never, Tommy Vann, & Barefoot Johnny.	McAvoy's of Parkville; Parkville, Maryland, U.S.A.
2018 Saturday, September 8 Sunday, September 9	Radio Pilots, Gary & the Groove, Tommy Vann, Foreplay, FD Automatic, Staggerwing, Voices, Rob Fahey & Friends, Orange Wedge, Seagull Legends Jam, LP & the 45s, Bottle of Blues, Lost Sanity, New Virtue, Creem Circus, Impact, Mark Bray, The Gigs, Paul Soroka, Dying Breed, Blacklight Orchestra, Core, Hectic Red, Silvertung, Spellbound, August, Dave DeMarco, Party of Ten, Eclipse, Tony Sciuto, Josh Christina, Midnite Run, Route 66. Note: certain bands scheduled to play were unable to perform due to poor weather conditions on Sunday, September 9.	Riverwatch Restaurant & Marina; Essex, Maryland, U.S.A.
2019 Saturday, September 7 Sunday, September 8	1974, Blacklight Orchestra, Blues Vultures/Ronnie Younkins, Mark Bray, Josh Christina, Steven Courtney Band, The Terah Crawford Band, Creem Circus, Crossfire, Dying Breed, Eclipse, Rob Fahey & the Pieces, Fantasm, Foreplay, The Gigs, Great Train Robbery, Lennon La Ricci, Little Richie & the All Stars, Magical Mystery Girls, Motel California, Orange Wedge, Petty Coat Junction, Radio Pilots, Rhythm Surf Monkeys, Rosabella, Route 66, Royal 5 + 1, Tony Sciuto, The Sindicate, Deni Starr Band, Taboo Tattoo, Top Dead Center, Tommy Vann & the Boss Band, and Windy City.	Riverwatch Restaurant & Marina; Essex, Maryland, U.S.A.
2020	The Stanstock Music Event had been canceled for 2020 due to the COVID-19 coronavirus pandemic. Instead, money is being raised for the Nicole Van Horn Foundation and Catch A Lift Fund by selling face masks and a book by Stan Gibson online. The music festival is expected to resume in 2021.	
2021 Saturday, September 11 Sunday, September 12	White Noise w/Stan Gibson, ByeStanDers, Tommy Vann, Back Road Crossing, That Which Remains, Lennon La Ricci, Chubby Hoo Hoo, Orange Wedge, The Route 66 Band, Harlan County Kings, KARMA, Spinoff, Kittyback, Foreplay, Blacklight Orchestra, Dying Breed, Fantasm, Josh Christina, Saving Sgt. Pepper, Who Knew?, Spellbound, Helium 4, Voices, Mark Bray, 2nd Stage Band, Making Waves, The GiGs, Radio Pilots, Great Train Robbery, Rhythm Surf Monkeys, Eclipse, Rob Fahey & the Pieces, & With Satellites.	Riverwatch Restaurant & Marina; Essex, Maryland, U.S.A.

=== Other guests and personalities ===
WBAL 11 Baltimore news anchor Stan Stovall visited Stanstock in 2016 as a guest emcee.
