= LocalLink 31 (BaltimoreLink) =

Bus route operated by the Maryland Transit Administration

Route 57
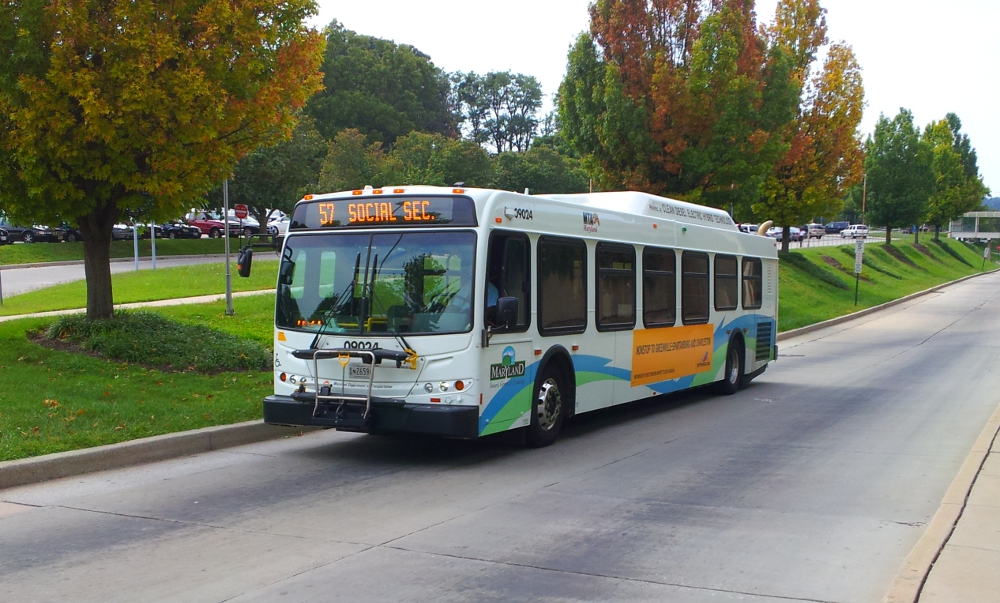

Overview
- System: Maryland Transit Administration
- Garage: Northwest
- Status: active
- Began service: 1987
- Predecessors: No. 33 Streetcar (1924-1948); Bus Route 28 (1947-1984); Bus Route R-3 (1984-1987); Bus Route M-6 (1987-2009)

Route
- Locale: Baltimore City; Baltimore County
- Communities served: Arlington; Howard Park; Gwynn Oak; Woodlawn
- Landmarks served: Gwynn Oak Park
- Other routes: 15, 20, 27, 33, qb40, 44, 51, 52, 77, 91, 99

Service
- Level: Daily
- Frequency: Every 30 minutes Every 30 minutes (peak)
- Weekend frequency: Every 40-60 minutes
- Operates: 5:30 am to 12:30 am

Route 57 is a bus route operated by the Maryland Transit Administration in Baltimore and its suburbs. The line currently runs from the Rogers Avenue Metro Subway Station in Northwest Baltimore to Security Square Mall, with selected trips to the Social Security Administration headquarters in Woodlawn. The line serves the corridor of Gwynn Oak Avenue and the communities of Howard Park, Gwynn Oak, and Windsor Mill.

The route is the successor to the 32 Woodlawn and 33 West Arlington streetcar lines and several bus routes.

== History ==
Route 57 started operating under the Route R-3 designation on June 18, 1984. Prior to 1984, the area had been served by other bus and streetcar lines, most recently Route 28, which had branches feeding into Liberty Heights Avenue and then operating through Downtown Baltimore mostly to Cherry Hill. These services operated on Sundays until 2001, when Route M-6 started operating on Sundays. The line has only had minor routing and schedule changes since its 1984 introduction, with the exception of two redesignations (in 1987 from R-3 to M-6 and in 2009 from M-6 to 57) and a controversial elimination in 2005 that was later reversed.

=== Origin ===
Streetcar service began on the Gwynn Oak corridor in 1924 with the initiation of the No. 33 Streetcar line, which operated as a branch of the No. 5 Streetcar line into Gwynn Oak Junction. This service was suspended briefly in 1930 in favor of a bus designated no. 20, bus streetcar service resumed later that same year.

The no. 33 streetcar line was discontinued when the no. 5 streetcar ended its service in 1948. But service along Gwynn Oak would continue to operate as branches of the No. 32 Streetcar, which became the Bus Route 32 in 1955. Bus Route 32 would become part of Bus Routes 28 and 37 in 1959.

Routes 28 and 37 had served Liberty Heights Avenue since 1947. The main bus line serving Liberty Heights in both directions was Route 28. While Route 28 operated in both directions, buses that had a final destination of Cherry Hill were designated no. 37. This was done to alert white residents of the communities in the Liberty Heights area that the bus's final destination was Cherry Hill, then a low class black community. This practice was discontinued in 1974 when the no. 37 designation was dropped, and all buses along this route were given the no. 28 designation. When Route 37 became a part of Route 28, it would continue to serve the Gwynn Oak area full-time until 1984. During this time, it would undergo extensions to Social Security and Security Square Mall following development of the Woodlawn area.

Route 28 would continue to serve the Gwynn Oak area outside of Metro's hours of operation until 2001. Route 28 had three branches: one to Randallstown, one to various points on Security Boulevard, and one to Belvedere and Belvieu. These covered most of the route of Route M-6 when Route M-6 did not operate. In 1996, Route 28 converted into a Sunday only service. The Belvedere and Belvieu branch was discontinued, and service on the other branches was increased. Other parts of route 28 were absorbed by existing parts or modifications to other lines. In September 2001, Route 28 was completely discontinued when Metro connection services were introduced on Sunday.

=== Greater Baltimore Bus Initiative ===
In October 2005, MTA completely eliminated Route M-6 from service. All trips on Route 44 were extended to either Security Square Mall or Social Security to replace the service. It was noted in literature produced by MTA that "service on Route M-6 was to be provided by Route 44." But this was not how riders and community activists viewed the change.

The elimination of Route M-6 was criticized as follows:

- Route 44 takes a slightly different route from Route M-6. Though this route is more direct while traveling to the Woodlawn area, it does not serve various side streets in the Howard Park community of Northwest Baltimore, an area populated by many senior citizens. These elderly residents were forced to walk several blocks in order to reach a bus line, one that operates in a very different direction.
- Route 44 is a long route, running for about an hour prior to reaching the Rogers Avenue Metro Subway Station. The service is far less reliable when attempting to reach the Security area from the Metro subway.
- Fewer trips were provided on Route 44 than were provided by Route M-6, especially during evenings and weekends. Also, Route 44 was overcrowded at these points.

In the weeks immediately following the elimination, community activists and delegates were told by MTA that Route M-6 service would not be restored, despite these complaints. MTA stated that Route 44 provided sufficient service, and only a small percentage of riders were negatively affected.

In March 2006, under extreme pressure from the community, MTA restored eight round trips on weekdays to Route M-6. MTA stated that this act was a compromise in exchange for hushing all other complaints against MTA in reference to this and other recent and planned changes in route. But rider advocates were not satisfied. These trips operated hourly during peak hours only. Activists continued to put pressure on MTA.

In October 2006, exactly 50 weeks after its original elimination, full-time service was restored on Route M-6. This took place at a time when officials were facing re-election. This change did not help the outgoing administration win re-election, but it did restore the line to its full-time, 7-day-a-week status.

On August 30, Route M-6 was redesignated Route 57. This completed MTA's plan to rename all M-lines to two digit designations.
