= Rosewood Center =

Coordinates: 39°25′25″N 76°46′15″W

- Maryland Department of Mental Health and Hygiene
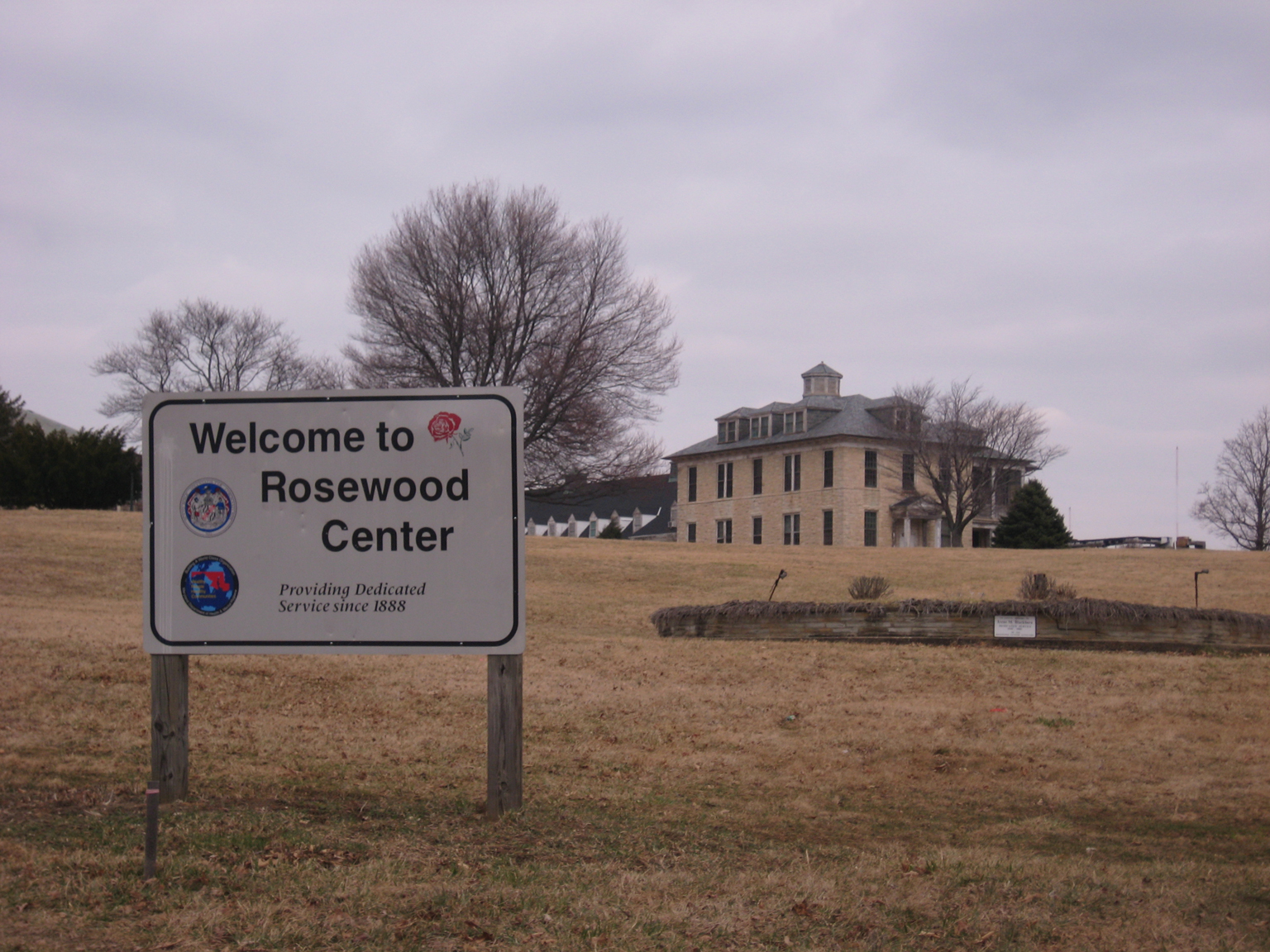

Geography
- Location: Owings Mills, Maryland, United States

Organization
- Care system: State-run institution
- Type: Specialist

Services
- Emergency department: No
- Specialty: Psychiatric

History
- Founded: 1888

Links
- Lists: Hospitals in Maryland

The Rosewood Center was an institution for people with developmental disabilities located on Rosewood Lane in Owings Mills, Maryland.

It was established in 1888 as the Asylum and Training School for the Feeble-Minded. From 1912 to 1961, it was known as the Rosewood State Training School. In 1961, the facility was renamed as the Rosewood State Hospital. After the state departments of health and mental hygiene merged in 1969, the facility was renamed the Rosewood Center. On January 15, 2008, the state of Maryland announced that Rosewood would be closed in the near future, and the center began the process of transferring residents to other facilities. It finally closed on June 30, 2009.

== History ==
=== 19th Century origins ===
In March 1888, The Maryland Legislature approved "An Act to establish and incorporate an Asylum and Training School for the Feeble Minded of the State of Maryland" (Chapter 183, Acts of 1888) which empowered a seventeen-member Board of Visitors to direct the selection of a site for a school which "shall receive, care for and educate all idiotic, imbecile and feeble-minded persons". Despite this sweeping command, only ten thousand dollars was appropriated for the land and buildings, with a five thousand dollar annual appropriation thereafter. The asylum was to be free of charge for all indigent children between seven and seventeen years of age, charging two hundred and fifty dollars for all other children.

Because of the inadequate housing and appropriation and the number of eligible applicants (conservatively estimated by the State Board of Health in 1884 at 1,319) the Board of Visitors had to adopt a restrictive admissions policy. Set forth by the Board in 1899, the admission policy confined itself to "those who are susceptible of a certain degree of training with the view to their being developed into a condition of utility and self-support, in other words it shall be a training school and not custodial.

Only white children between seven and seventeen years of age were admitted. Boys were taught farming, gardening and carpentry while girls learned sewing, washing, milking and horticulture, as well as training for domestic service. With these skills, it was hoped that the inmates would be self-supporting on their release at seventeen.

The training served another purpose as well, as the Board often displayed an almost obsessive desire to have the asylum be self-supporting. Much of the food was grown or raised on the surrounding farm and virtually all the clothes and table linen were made by the girls. All laundry and cleaning was done by the inmates and their labor was even used during the excavations for new buildings in 1892 and 1900. The farm continued in operation until the 1960s.

=== 20th century ===
In 1900 the Board unsuccessfully proposed the construction of a separate school for the "colored feeble-minded" and for an additional building for epileptic children. The latter hope was realized when the Thom Cottage was erected in 1896 through a private donation. Another hope was realized when in 1894 and 1907 the Maryland Legislature passed bills to transfer all insane and feeble-minded patients from county almshouses to state institutions. While this created pressure on the physical plant at Rosewood, it also ensured continued state funding.

From 1911 to 1933, 166 patients, mostly women and girls, left Rosewood under habeas corpus writs; they were subject to human trafficking, bought by the rich as indentured servants and unpaid laborers, often callously treated and often abandoned by their "carers." Leo Kanner denounced this scandal in front of the American Psychiatric Association in 1937.

In 1912 the name of the facility was changed to "Rosewood Training School", reflecting changes in professional attitudes and terminology. The school greatly expanded its capacity during the twentieth century and by 1968 had approximately 2,700 patients, a number nearly triple that of only seventeen years earlier.

By World War II the nature of patient care at Rosewood had drastically changed since the 1890s. Originally the institution was charged with the training, education and care of children, and the building of classroom space had been deemed as important as the building of residential quarters. In fact, classrooms and patient wards were often found within the same building. Later, the emphasis shifted from the patient, this development and eventual release to need for protection of society by institutionalizing the patient for life. In 1943 the physically handicapped were admitted and in 1950 all age restrictions for admission were officially removed. Born out of the great humanitarian sentiments of the nineteenth century, Rosewood deteriorated into a custodial institution.

Despite the rapid expansion of facilities during this period, Rosewood continually suffered from over-crowding and a shortage of staff, often resulting in unsatisfactory patient conditions. These conditions were periodically reported during the 1940s in newspaper stories, culminating in 1949 in the series of articles in The Baltimore Sun on Rosewood and other state hospitals titled, "Maryland's Shame". Public reaction to this expose and a series of grand jury reports in the 1950s focused attention on the need to better rehabilitate and eventually de-institutionalize patients while improving conditions for those requiring life-time care.

In 1952, Dr. Howard A. Howe successfully inoculated children against polio at the Rosewood State Hospital, just before the pioneer inoculation programs of Dr. Jonas Salk who used a more refined vaccine that was easier to mass-produce.

=== Modern era and integration ===
The hospital was integrated in 1956 and African American patients at the mentally disabled unit of Crownsville State Hospital were transferred to Rosewood. In 1963, Henryton State Hospital was converted to an institution for the mentally disabled. After reaching a high in the late 1960s, the patient population sharply declined as the emphasis shifted to the integration of the people with developmental disabilities into the community. The trend toward deinstitutionalization of patients has continued, rendering many of the older custodial-care buildings obsolete. Several, including King, Thorn, Holland, Wyman and Hill cottages, were razed, in addition to many of the farm buildings.

Between the 1950s and 1970s, as in many similar state-run institutions in the United States, there were numerous reports of malpractice, neglect and abuse. In 1981, the U.S. Justice Department declared that residents at Rosewood "failed to receive minimally adequate care". Further investigations confirmed the reports, leading to the older buildings' being condemned in 1989.

The old and new facilities stood directly across a field from each other, the newer facility actively housed over half of the people with developmental disabilities who reside in Maryland's four state-run institutions. The main building was burnt in a 2006 case of arson.

=== Fire and closure ===
On Sunday, March 8, 2009, one of Rosewood's vacant buildings was destroyed by fire. The building had previously been approved for demolition, so firefighters allowed the building to burn rather than attempt to put it out. The Maryland State Fire Marshal investigated the fire as possible arson.

The State of Maryland Department of Health and Mental Hygiene closed Rosewood on June 30, 2009.

It was used as a training location for the Maryland state police until 2013, when a police officer in training was shot and killed on the location during a training exercise.

At the Maryland State Archives in Annapolis there is a large collection of historic photos that illustrates the care of the Rosewood residents, and records related to patients and the administration of the hospital.

== Future plans ==
The Rosewood Center borders the Owings Mills campus of Stevenson University. Future expansion of Stevenson University may include acquisition of the Rosewood Center land, in whole or in part. Following resolution of environmental and surveyor issues, Stevenson announced in June 2017 that they were granted permission to acquire the Rosewood Center. Plans for the site include expansion for the School of Education and additional athletic fields. Stevenson University assumed ownership of the property on September 25, 2020. Construction was completed in 2022 for the Owings Mills East campus and athletic fields opened in fall of 2022.

== In popular culture ==
The 2017 thriller film The Institute is loosely based on Rosewood Center. The film is stated by its producers to be based on true events.
