= Cromwell Bridge Road =

Roadway in Maryland, U.S.

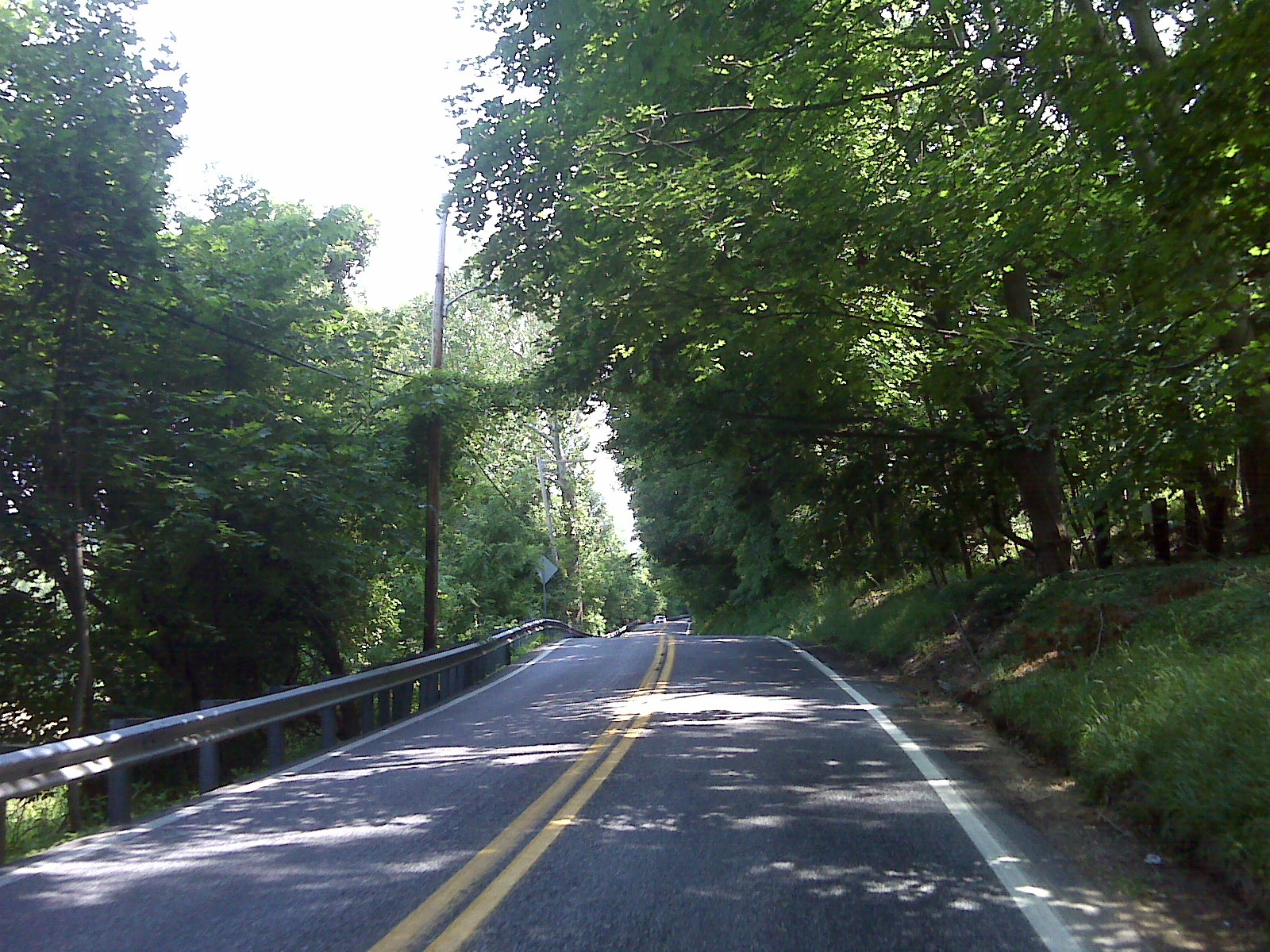
- Cromwell Bridge Road scenic area
- Former name: Maryland Route 567
- Type: Two-lane
- Location: Towson, Maryland, U.S.
- From: Providence Road (Towson)
- To: Split at Glen Arm Road/Cub Hill Road

Cromwell Bridge Road, formerly Maryland Route 567, is a two-lane roadway in the Towson, Maryland area of the United States. The road begins at Providence Road in Towson, and continues past the Baltimore Beltway for several miles along the Cromwell Valley to its end, where it splits, a left turn going onto Glen Arm Road and a right turn onto Cub Hill Road.

Cromwell Bridge Road, which is exit 29 off the Baltimore Beltway in a set of ramps shared with Loch Raven Boulevard, is mostly undeveloped. A short section of the route between Providence Road and about a block past the beltway is filled with commercial development including office buildings, hotels, a park-and-ride lot that serves as the main northern terminus for Maryland Transit Administration bus route 3 and 104 and its two major landmarks: Loch Raven High School and Rock City Church.

The remainder of the road, which has few intersections, is designated as Maryland's "Horses and Hounds" scenic byway, mostly lined with trees, except for a portion where the Loch Raven Reservoir is visible.

== History ==
That part of Cromwell Bridge Road between present-day Satyr Hill and Glen Arm/Cub Hill Road was once part of the original Old Harford Road when the latter was the main route of choice between parts of southern Harford County and the port of Baltimore. Part of the right-of-way of the former Maryland and Pennsylvania Railroad closely parallels Cromwell Bridge Road from the Baltimore Beltway to Cub Hill Road. The graded railroad bed and numerous bridge abutments have remained largely undisturbed along this stretch of the former railroad since its abandonment in 1958. The railroad's construction in this area occurred during 1882–1883.

The MD 567 designation used for part of the road was decommissioned in 1999.

== In the media ==
This portion of the road came to media attention in 2007, when Baltimore Gas and Electric Company (BGE) began an operation to clear the trees lining the road to prevent them from interfering with power lines and to make the road safe for motorists. After complaints from area residents over how this would impact on the road's status as a scenic byway, BGE agreed to temporarily halt cutting down these trees.
