= Towson Place =

- Location: Towson, Maryland, United States
- Coordinates: 39°23′41.5″N 76°34′53″W
- Address: 1238 Putty Hill Ave. Towson, MD
- Opened: 1962 (Eudowood); 1998 (Towson Place)
- Closed: December 1995 (Towson Marketplace)
- Developer: Food Fair
- Manager: Kimco Realty
- Owner: Kimco Realty
- Num. of stores: 20+
- Num. of anchor tenants: 10
- Floor area: 679,843 sq ft (63,159.5 m^{2})
- Floors: Outdoor, 2 In Haverty's and Walmart
- Public transit: MTA Maryland bus: 36, 53, CityLink Green

Towson Place, formerly Eudowood Plaza and Towson Marketplace, is an outdoor shopping center in Towson, Maryland. Opened in 1962, it was redeveloped extensively in 1998. The shopping center's major stores include Target, Weis Markets, Marshalls, Burlington, Ollie's Bargain Outlet, PetSmart, Michaels, TJ Maxx, and Havertys. It is managed by Kimco Realty.

== History ==
Eudowood Plaza opened August 23, 1962. The open-air mall was developed on land that had previously been part of Eudowood Sanatorium by the supermarket chain Food Fair, which was an anchor store along with Montgomery Ward and Woolworth. A Best Products was added in 1976. The Best building was one of the stores designed by Sculpture in the Environment (SITE) for that chain, featuring a 450-ton masonry facade tilted at a 35-degree angle.

In 1981, Bramalea Limited bought the mall. The company spent $9 million to enclose the concourses and add discount retailers. It was at this point that the center was renamed Towson Marketplace. As part of these renovations, the Woolworth store was replaced with Marshalls. Despite these renovations, the mall remained poorly tenanted in the 1990s, and lacked visibility from nearby Joppa Road.

Bramalea sold off the mall in 1991. By December 1995, the mall was under the ownership of Talisman, who proposed to demolish most of the structure. By year's end, the last inline tenants had closed, leaving only Marshalls, Toys "R" Us, Montgomery Ward, Best Products, and Herman's World of Sporting Goods. Four months later, the Best Products store was demolished to make way for construction of a Target. Throughout 1997 and 1998, the center was largely demolished for conversion to a power center, which included PetSmart, Bed Bath & Beyond, Super Fresh, Sports Authority, TJ Maxx, and Michaels along with the existing Montgomery Ward, Toys "R" Us, and Marshalls stores.

Montgomery Ward later closed its store when the chain went out of business in 2001. A two-story portion of the new center featured Today's Man on the lower level and DSW on the upper level. In 2004, DSW moved its store down to the space vacated by Today's Man after that store closed, and Filene's Basement opened its first Maryland store in DSW's original location.

Kimco Realty bought the center in February 2004, just as Walmart moved into the space vacated by Montgomery Ward. Reflecting its former Montgomery Ward department store configuration, the Wal-Mart has two levels with escalators. Filene's Basement closed and became Havertys in 2012. Super Fresh closed in 2012 and became Weis Markets a year later. Sports Authority closed in 2016 due to its bankruptcy and was replaced by Burlington in 2018.

On June 29, 2018, Toys "R" Us closed all their stores in the U.S. including the one at Towson Place. Ollie's Bargain Outlet opened in that space in 2019. DSW also relocated that year.

On April 24, 2023, It was announced that Bed Bath & Beyond would be closing as part of a plan to close all 360 Bed Bath & Beyond and 120 Buy Buy Baby stores nationwide due to bankruptcy. The store closed on July 30.

On March 6, 2024, it was announced that Walmart would be closing on April 5 due to underperformance.
