= Tall Cedars of Lebanon =

Masonic body

Emblem of the Tall Cedars of Lebanon

The Tall Cedars of Lebanon International is a side degree of Freemasonry in certain Grand Jurisdictions, open to Master Masons in good standing in a regular Masonic lodge. Its motto, "Fun, Frolic, & Fellowship," is indicative of this social bent. Its members are distinguished by the pyramid-shaped hats they wear at their functions. The name is derived from the cedars of Lebanon that King Solomon used to build his temple.

== History ==
The degree originated before the establishment of the formal organization. Some historians trace it as far back as the 1840s. The awarding of the degree apparently involved a deal of roughhousing. This degree was conferred on Master Masons after their Blue Lodge meeting closed. This degree was conferred by traveling Masons throughout the East Coast. This original group of Tall Cedars called their degree the "Ancient and honorable right of humility". The Ancient Order of Tall Cedars continued until 1902.

The Tall Cedars of Lebanon of North America was founded in 1902 in Trenton, New Jersey. Glassboro Forest #1 was the first charted forest. The organization adopted its present official name in 2023, and is now known as Tall Cedars of Lebanon International.

The organization now has forests in Mexico, El Salvador and Brazil.

== Organization ==
Cedars meet in groups called "forests," each headed by a Grand Tall Cedar. These forests most often meet at the local Masonic hall. The Tall Cedars claim 6,300 members, mostly in the eastern United States. Its center of activity was, and is the states of New Jersey and Pennsylvania; the Tall Cedars' national governing body, the Supreme Forest, is headquartered in Harrisburg, Pennsylvania. The current Supreme Tall Cedar — the TCL's highest-ranking officer — is Michael Youse.

There are two further side degrees with the group - the Royal Court and the Sidonian. There is also a marching band called the Royal Rangers.

== Charitable activities ==
The Tall Cedar Foundation exists as the body's charitable arm, supporting research on muscular dystrophy and other neuromuscular diseases. In 1951, it became the first organization to join with the Muscular Dystrophy Association in sponsorship. The Tall Cedars redirected their efforts in 2023 to supporting children and families afflicted with neuromuscular diseases or muscular dystrophy at a local level.
