= Wockenfuss Candies =

American confectionery company

- Founded: Baltimore, Maryland
- Founder: Herman Charles Wockenfuss
- Headquarters: Baltimore, Maryland
- Area served: Baltimore, Maryland and Eastern Maryland
- Key people: Paul Wockenfuss, president and owner
- Website: wockenfusscandies.com

Wockenfuss Candies is a Baltimore-based chocolatier and chain of candy stores in Maryland. The company was founded by the Wockenfuss family in 1915. The family immigrated to the United States from Germany in 1887.

== Overview ==
Herman Charles Wockenfuss was born in 1875 in Germany. He came to America in 1887 where he learned how to make candy. In 1915, he opened the Wockenfuss Candy Company, known as Wockenfuss Candies.

In 1939, Herman Lee, Herman Charles' son, graduated from Baltimore Polytechnic Institute, and enlisted in the Army. He was medically discharged due to an injury to his knee. During World War II, he remained a civilian employee of the Army, and worked at Pearl Harbor as a machinist. Herman Charles continued to operate the business until his son, Herman Lee and his wife, Marian, took over in 1945 when Herman Lee returned from World War II. Under Herman Lee's direction, the business added three more stores to its current operation on Belair Road in the Gardenville area of Baltimore, where they continued to make candies in the basement. From there, the business expanded in Maryland.

Herman Lee died in 2014. Their son, Paul, is now the owner and president of Wockenfuss Candies. Under Paul's direction, the business has expanded to eight retail stores in Baltimore, Harford, Howard, and Worcester counties. Currently four generations of the Wockenfuss family are involved in the business.

By 1980, the company had 55 employees, and was using 60,000 pounds of chocolate during the Easter season, their busiest period of the year.

== Types of candy ==
Wockenfuss candies has a variety of confectioneries such as caramel apples, fudge, and lollipops. Some of their specialties include fruit shaped marzipan, crystallized ginger, and mint nonpareils. Kids have a special selection of candy necklaces, gold coins, and cow tails to choose from. The family makes a variety chocolate covered nuts such as cashews, Brazil nuts, almonds, and pecans. They also make gourmet truffles and a handful of chocolate covered fruity creams.
