= Maryland Route 542 =

State highway in Maryland, United States

Maryland Route 542
- Maryland Route 542 highlighted in red

Route information
- Maintained by MDSHA and Baltimore DOT
- Length: 6.33 mi (10.19 km)
- Existed: 1935–present

Major junctions
- South end: MD 147 in Baltimore
- North end: I-695 / Cromwell Bridge Road near Towson

Location
- Country: United States
- State: Maryland
- Counties: City of Baltimore, Baltimore

Highway system
- Maryland highway system; Interstate; US; State; Scenic Byways
← MD 537	→ MD 543

Maryland Route 542 (MD 542) is a state highway in the U.S. state of Maryland. Known for most of its length as Loch Raven Boulevard, the state highway runs 6.33 miles (10.19 km) from MD 147 in Baltimore north to Interstate 695 (I-695) and Cromwell Bridge Road near Towson. MD 542 is a four-lane divided highway that connects portions of Northeast Baltimore with Towson and I-695. The state highway is maintained by the Maryland State Highway Administration in Baltimore County and the Baltimore City Department of Transportation in the city. MD 542 was constructed in the early to mid-1930s. The highway was expanded to a divided highway in Baltimore by 1950 and in Baltimore County in the mid- to late 1950s.

== Route description ==
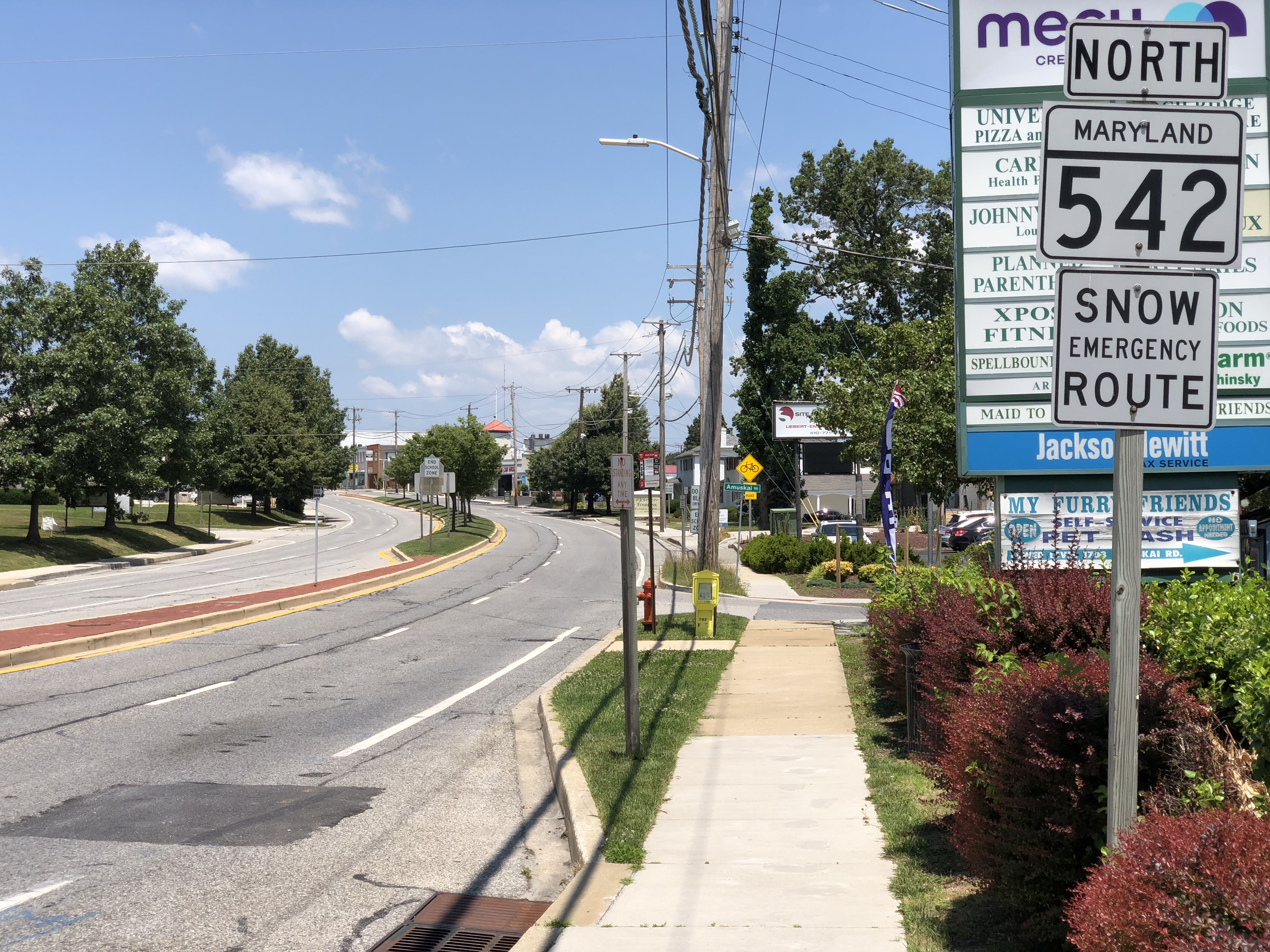
View north along MD 542 at Joan Avenue and Mussula Road south of I-695 near Towson

MD 542 begins at an intersection with MD 147 (Harford Road) adjacent to Clifton Park in Baltimore. St. Lo Drive heads south into the city park on the south side of the intersection. The state highway heads north as The Alameda, a four-lane divided boulevard through the Coldstream-Homestead-Montebello neighborhood, where the highway passes Baltimore City College. North of 33rd Street, MD 542 heads through the Ednor Gardens-Lakeside neighborhood north to Loch Raven Boulevard. MD 542 switches to Loch Raven Boulevard while The Alameda continues through the Northwood neighborhood. The state highway intersects Cold Spring Lane and crosses Chinquapin Run. North of Good Samaritan Hospital, MD 542 intersects Northern Parkway and leaves the city limits.

MD 542 meets the northern end of Hillen Road shortly after entering Baltimore County on the eastern edge of Towson. The state highway's northbound direction gains a third lane north to Taylor Avenue, where the highway veers northeast. MD 542 intersects Putty Hill Avenue and Joppa Road before reaching I-695 (Baltimore Beltway). The state highway passes under the Beltway and has ramps from eastbound I-695 to southbound MD 542 and from northbound MD 542 to eastbound I-695. MD 542 curves northwest and reaches its northern terminus at Cromwell Bridge Road. The northwest leg of the terminal intersection comprises ramps to and from westbound I-695.

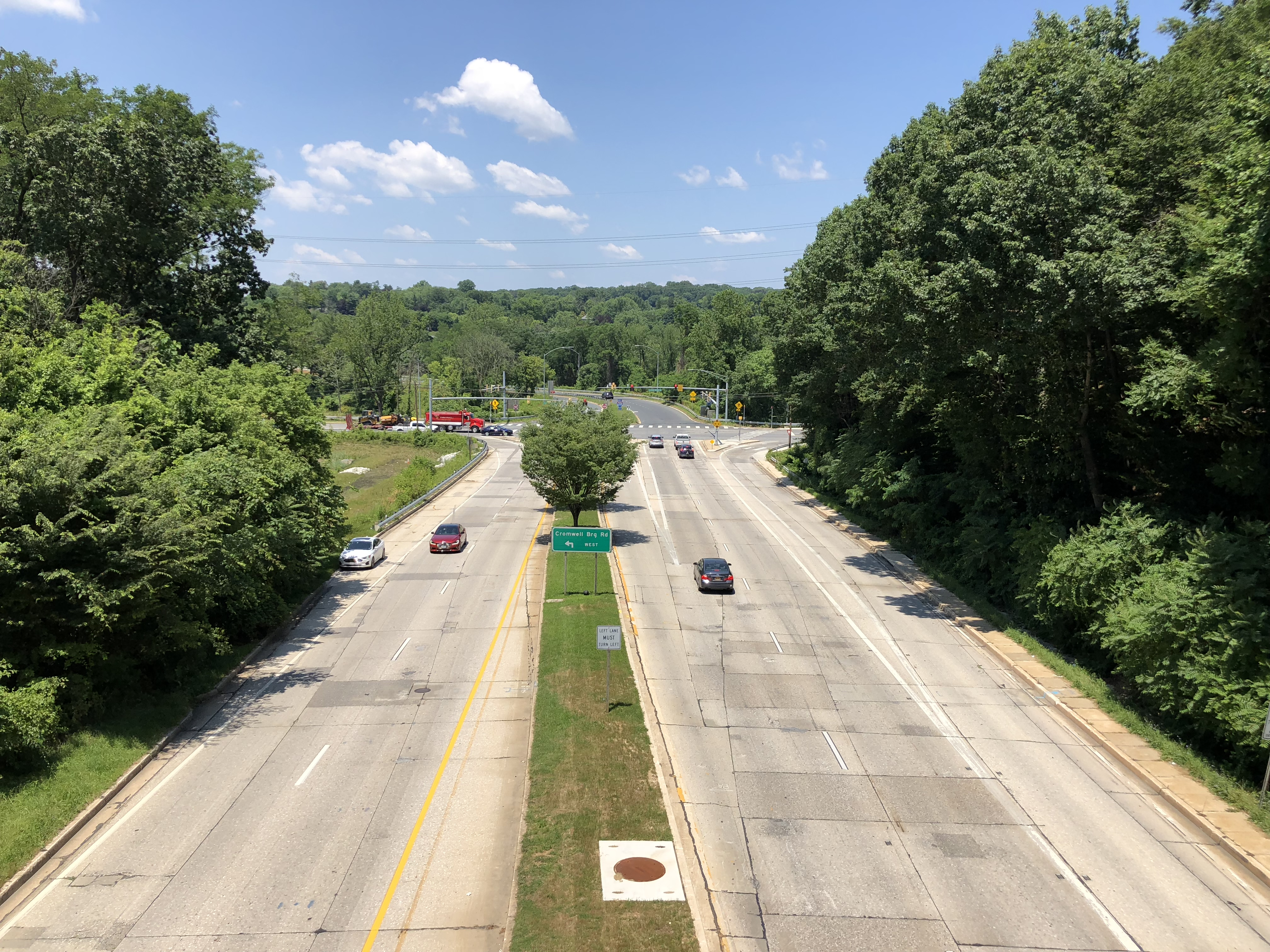
View north along MD 542 from I-695 in Carney, just south of its northern terminus

MD 542 is a part of the National Highway System as a principal arterial from Northern Parkway in Baltimore to its northern terminus at Cromwell Bridge Road near Towson.

== History ==
Loch Raven Boulevard was constructed around 1933 from 33rd Street to Hillen Road just north of the city limits. MD 542 was extended north in three sections in 1934 and 1935. The first section was an upgrade of Hillen Road north to what is now Goucher Boulevard. The second and third sections were new construction north to Taylor Avenue and Joppa Road, respectively. By 1950, Loch Raven Boulevard was extended north to its present terminus at Cromwell Bridge Road and expanded to a divided highway from MD 147 to Hillen Road. MD 542 was expanded to a divided highway from Hillen Road to Joppa Road between 1954 and 1956. The state highway was widened to a four-lane divided highway from Joppa Road to Cromwell Bridge Road concurrent with the completion of the Baltimore Beltway from York Road to Cromwell Bridge Road in 1958. The ramps to eastbound I-695 were added when the freeway was completed from Cromwell Bridge Road to Belair Road in 1962.

== Junction list ==
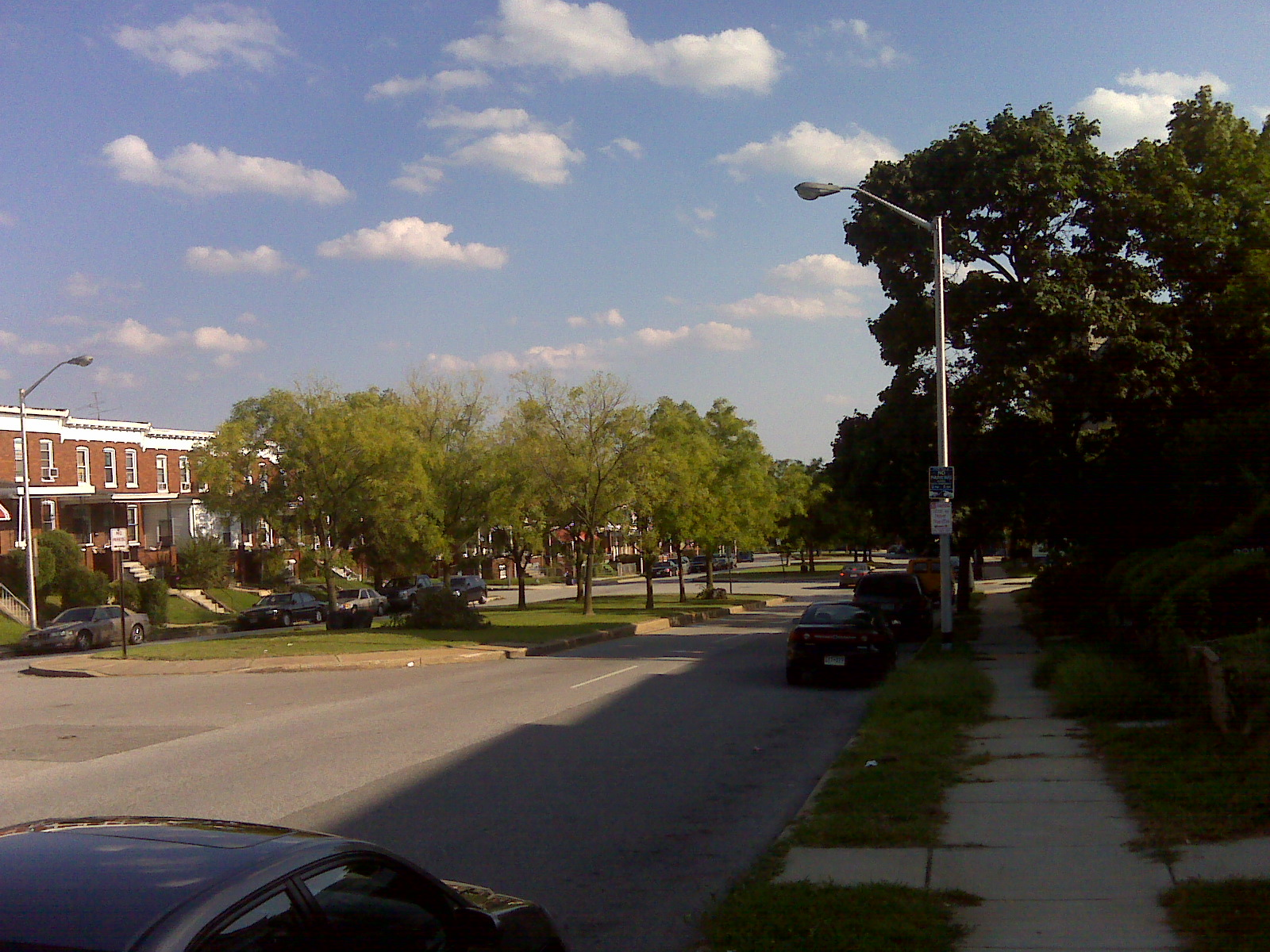
The Alameda near MD 542's southern terminus at MD 147 in Baltimore

County	Location	mi	km	Destinations	Notes
Baltimore City		0.00	0.00	MD 147 (Harford Road) / St. Lo Drive south	Southern terminus
Baltimore City		0.96	1.54	Loch Raven Boulevard south / The Alameda north	MD 542 veers north onto Loch Raven Boulevard
Baltimore City		1.81	2.91	Cold Spring Lane	
Baltimore City		3.25	5.23	Northern Parkway	
Baltimore	Towson	5.89	9.48	Joppa Road	
Baltimore	Towson	6.21	9.99	I-695 east (Baltimore Beltway) – Essex	I-695 Exit 29; eastbound exit and entrance from I-695
Baltimore	Towson	6.33	10.19	I-695 west (Baltimore Beltway) / Cromwell Bridge Road – Towson	I-695 Exit 29; northern terminus
1.000 mi = 1.609 km; 1.000 km = 0.621 mi
