= The Shops at Kenilworth =

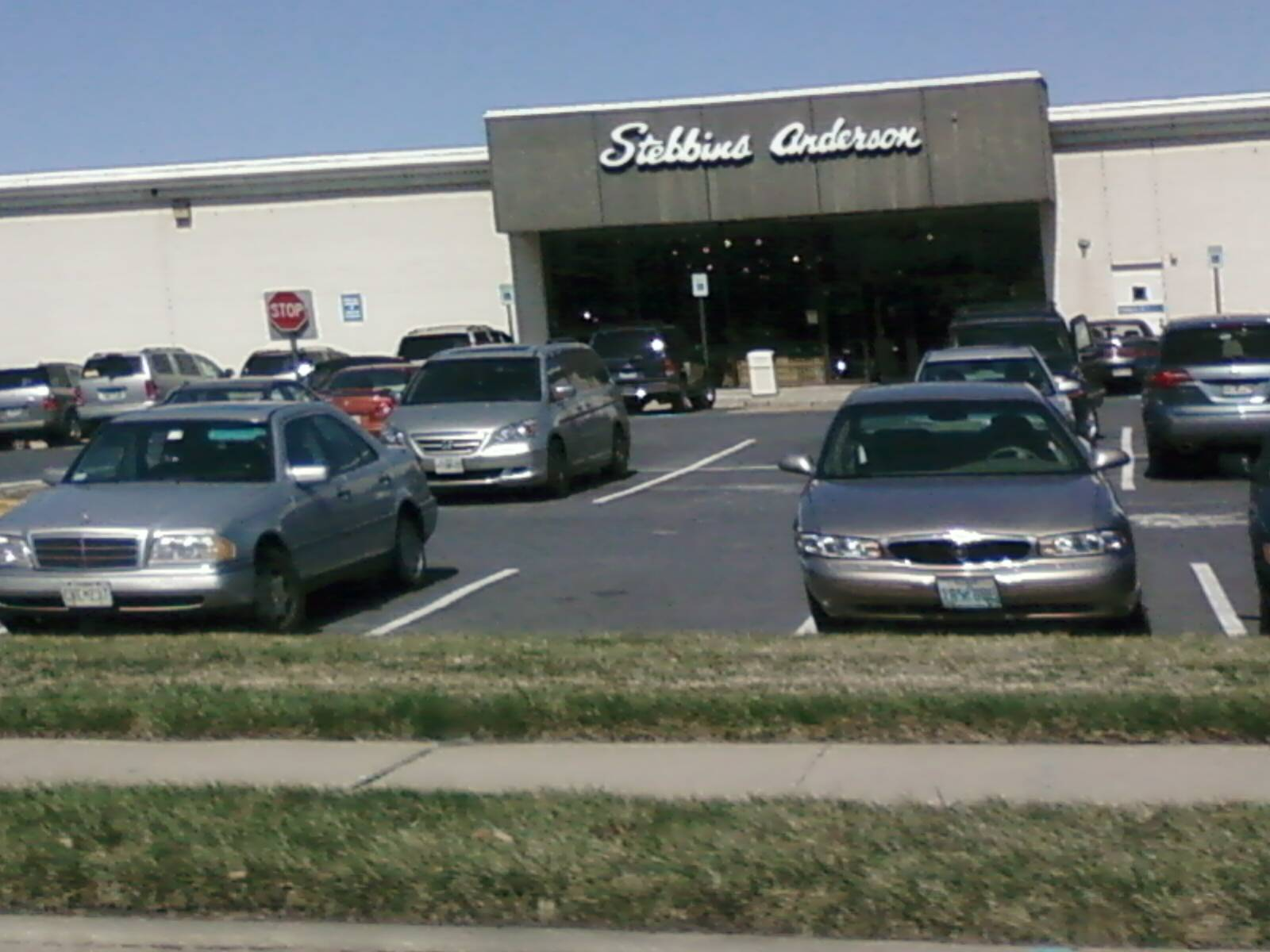
- The facade of Stebbins Anderson, a former anchor tenant at the mall.
- Location: Towson, Maryland, United States
- Coordinates: 39.4118°N 76.6189°W
- Address: 800 Kenilworth Drive
- Opened: 1979
- Manager: Greenberg Gibbons
- Owner: Greenberg Gibbons
- Num. of stores: 30+
- Num. of anchor tenants: 4
- Floor area: 147,507 sq ft (13,703.8 m^{2}).
- Floors: 2
- Parking: 762 spaces, including a two-story parking garage
- Website: www.theshopsatkenilworth.com

The Shops at Kenilworth is a shopping mall in Towson, Maryland. It is owned and operated by Greenberg Gibbons and features anchors Trader Joe's, About Faces Day Spa, The Mine and Arhaus. It has more than 30 stores and 147,507 square ft of gross leasable area.

== History ==
The mall opened in 1979 as the Kenilworth Bazaar. The original anchor stores were Stebbins Anderson and Hochschild Kohn's.

In 2008, the mall started to undergo a multimillion-dollar facelift. The mall managed to attract new tenants, despite a downturned economy that year. In 2009, the mall celebrated its 30th anniversary, and stated that its retailers were doing well, despite the downturn in the economy.

In 2014, developer Greenberg Gibbons would buy a stake in the mall, fully acquiring it in 2015. After taking full ownership, Greenberg Gibbons announced a multi-million dollar renovation and expansion of the mall, including reconfiguration of the current retail space to give the mall street frontage on Kenilworth Drive. As part of the process, Stebbins Anderson downsized to only occupy the ground level of the mall. Trader Joe's would occupy the majority of the former Stebbins space as the expansion was completed in 2017 and Trader Joe's would open on March 17, 2017.

In 2019, longtime tenant Stebbins Anderson announced that it would be closing its store, which had downsized to a single floor in 2015, following the closure of its Ace Hardware store. The store would be replaced by The Mine, a boutique fitness studio, in 2022. Another former anchor, Jos. A. Bank, would close in 2021 to be replaced by Arhaus, which opened in 2023.

== Anchors ==
- Trader Joe's (since 2017)
- Arhaus (since 2023)
