= Mall curfew =

Policy against minors alone in malls

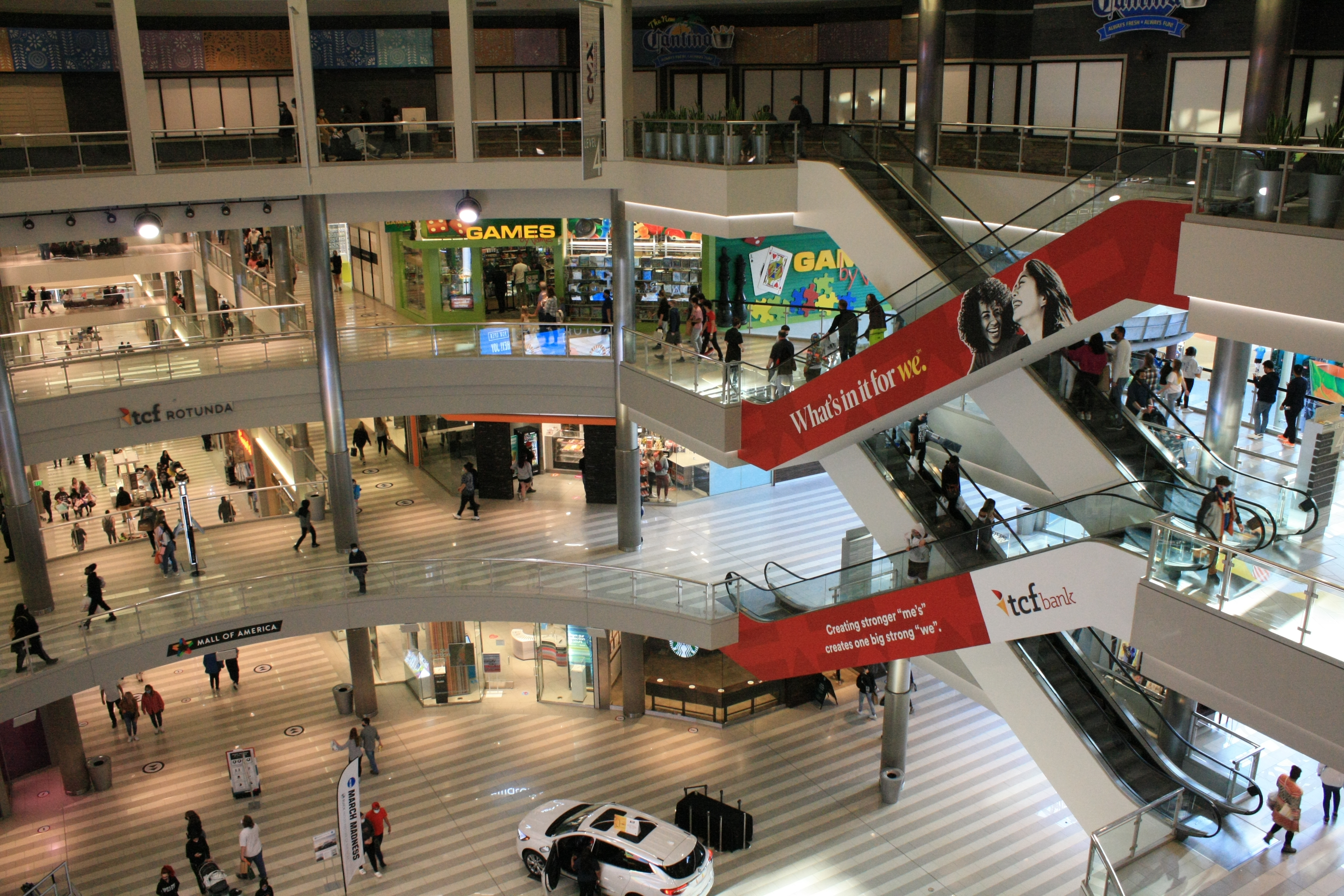
The Mall of America in Bloomington, Minnesota was the first mall to draw national attention for its adoption of a curfew policy.

In the United States, many shopping malls have implemented mall curfews, chaperone policies, or parental escort policies: measures to prevent minors from entering or staying on mall property during curfew times unless they are accompanied by a guardian. Mall curfews have been implemented in shopping malls since the 1980s, and those who implement similar policies often justify them by citing "unruly behavior" reported from unsupervised teenagers. One of the first malls to implement a mall curfew was the Mall of America in 1996, which received opposition from the American Civil Liberties Union which asserted the policy infringed on the rights of young people.

Mall curfews are reportedly effective at reducing the number of incidents and reports made to law enforcement at malls related to minors, but are frequently cited as disproportionately affecting people of color.

Locations with curfew policies will often make exceptions for minors who are working during curfew, and vary in their specific methods of implementation based on affected dates and curfew times.

== History ==
The first mall curfew to be widely reported was a policy at the Mall of America that restricted access to unattended minors under the age of 16. Officials at the mall made statements indicating that the policy was implemented following complaints of intimidation by teenagers, and that the policy was modeled after a practice at a mall in Asheville, North Carolina. In the following years, studies on the effects of and motivations for the curfew were undertaken that considered the constitutionality and public relations effects of the policy. The legality of similar policies has been unclear based on the definition of public spaces across jurisdictions. Despite the efforts of individuals and activism groups such as the American Civil Liberties Union and Refuse and Resist, the Mall of America maintains its curfew policy as of 2024.

The number of malls implementing curfews increased to 66 by 2010. Jesse Tron of the International Council of Shopping Centers stated at the time that similar curfew policies would be enacted in a cyclical fashion every holiday season. Malls continue to create curfew policies as of 2023. A policy implemented in October 2023 at Garden State Plaza in Paramus, New Jersey, sparked commentary on the necessity and effects of mall curfews.

== Implementation ==
Adoption of a curfew policy is often preceded by a high volume of complaints or incidents involving minors. Such adoptions may be influenced by activities external to the mall or the adoption of similar policies in other locations.

Implementing a mall curfew generally stipulates the posting of security guards or detectives at the entrance(s) of a mall, with other mall workers regularly surveying hallways for unattended minors to remove them from the premises. At least one location has stipulated that unaccompanied minors wear lanyards with their parents' contact information if they are to stay at the mall after 5 PM. Minors are often required to be supervised after curfew hours by a chaperone, usually a parent. Curfew policies are frequently implemented only on Fridays and Saturdays, when traffic from minors would be at its highest. For minors that work at malls during curfew times, badges may be used to identify them as separate from those unaffiliated from the mall.

=== Outside the United States ===
Malls in the Philippines and Georgia have involuntarily been subject to broad curfews affecting all businesses and age ranges due to the COVID-19 pandemic.

== Effects and responses ==
Mall curfew policies have been cited as an effective means of reducing police calls and arrests at malls, but have been criticized as a restriction of the rights of young people and as disproportionately affecting people of color. Reviews of the effects of youth curfews in general since 2002 have found that they have little to no effect on crime; chaperone policies in malls have been compared to the stop-and-frisk program in New York City.

Some mall retailers have cited curfews as beneficial towards traffic, stating that they reduce the number of people loitering in stores.

== See also ==
- Youth exclusion
- Fear of youth
