= Baltimore County Public Library =

Public library system of Baltimore County, Maryland, United States

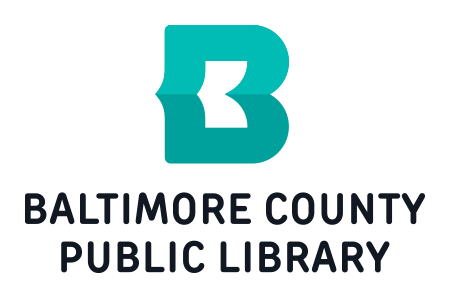

- Interior view of the Towson Branch
- 39°23′04″N 76°34′23″W
- Location: Baltimore County, Maryland
- Type: Public library
- Established: 1948
- Branches: 19

Collection
- Size: 1.8 million (2018)

Access and use
- Circulation: 11.2 million (2018)
- Population served: 831,128 (2018)

Other information
- Budget: US$44,583,291 (2018)
- Director: Vacant as of December 9, 2025
- Employees: 503.3 FTE (2018)
- Website: www.bcpl.info

Baltimore County Public Library (BCPL) is a public library system located in central Maryland and headquartered in Towson, Maryland Established in 1948, BCPL serves Baltimore County, Maryland, which surrounds but does not include the city of Baltimore. Occasionally the two library systems share resources and expertise.

BCPL operates 19 branch locations and 4 bookmobiles, with the two largest branches at Cockeysville and Towson.

BCPL offers a wide variety of services, with its branches offering a collection of current, high-demand print and non-print items, including books on compact discs, DVDs, and video games, as well as access to online research databases, downloadable audiobooks, and ebooks. All branches provide public computer access, are Wi-Fi accessible, and offer free programs and activities for all ages.

== History ==
=== 1940s to 1970s ===
In 1948, the BCPL system was established by combining twelve independent libraries into one system. The current branches in Reistertown, Sparrows Point, founded with space provided by the Bethlehem Steel Corporation, Towson, and Relay, opened before 1936, with all the others opening sometime after 1940. This new library system had a board of trustees to consolidate these 12 independent libraries. By October of the same year, an administrative office had opened, at its temporary location sitting on Towson's 120 West Pennsylvania Avenue and a county librarian, Richard D. Minnich, was appointed. The following year, the Cockeysville Branch of the BCPL had moved to a space in the "former Zink residence" which was a "small house located near the Cockeysville School" and sitting on York Road.

By the 1950s, the BCPL system began to change. The Arbutus Branch of the BCPL moved itself into a larger space above an A&P supermarket, just like the branch in Pikesville, while the Parkville community, until 1952, continued to host an independent library which eventually moved to the basement of Saint Ursula's Church. When the Parkville Library closed its doors, the BCPL started to provide library services to the community using a bookmobile.

In 1961, the Parkville Branch opened at rented quarters, the Cockeysville Branch opened in a 3,000 square feet building, and the Reistertown branch, which occupies a building dating back to the 1820s when it was Franklin Academy, was created. In the following years there were more improvements. For one, in 1962, the Arbutus Branch moved to a "more modern building" on Sulphur Spring Road, and the year after that, the current Catonsville Branch was dedicated on what was formerly the site of Castle Thunder, home of English businessman Richard Caton and Polly Carroll," the latter who was the daughter of Charles Carroll, a signer of the Declaration of Independence in 1776. The same year, the original Perry Hall Branch opened on Belair Road. Many years later, in January 1968, the Cockeysville Branch "was expanded...to an 11,000 square foot facility."

In the 1970s, the BCPL system again expanded. In January 1971, the Parkville-Carney Branch opened at its current location, renamed from the Parkville Branch after "an appeal by residents of Carney to show that both communities were served by the facility. Years later, in May 1974, the current structure which comprises the Towson Branch was constructed, which is in a brutalist style.

=== The BCPL System in the 1980s and 1990s ===
In the 1980s the library system again changed with the times. In February 1982, the Cockeyville Branch opened at its current location, being one "of the first libraries in the nation featuring open-face bookstore display shelving and neon signage." In the same year, the Pikesville Branch opened on the Pikesville Community Center's first level, a building which currently "houses a senior center and a health center" as well. The following year, the PTA of Hereford High School initiated the idea for a library in the Northern part of Baltimore County. In later years, the Towson Branch would be recognized for its accomplishments. In 1985, the Baltimore City Paper would give the branch the "Best Library award" and the year after that the County Executive would recognize the branch for its "outstanding contributions" to the community. Two years later, in 1988, the Hereford Branch opened "on the first floor of the Hereford Center building" with Dennis Rasmussen, then County Executive and Dutch Ruppersberger, then a County Councilman, cutting the ribbon to open the facility. The same year the White Marsh Branch opened in "15,000 square-foot" facility, which is within the current White Marsh Town Center.

In the 1990s, there were further changes. The Towson Branch was expanded in 1990, becoming a "landmark building in the heart of Towson." The same year all branches of the BCPL were closed for Staff Day. In later years, the Reisterstown Branch was renovated, in 1995 with an expanded "parking lot and a 1,800 square foot addition," and the Heidelbach Memorial Garden, in the Catonsville Branch, was dedicated after a push by the Catonsville Garden Club.

=== The BCPL System in the 21st century ===
In the 2000s numerous BCPL branches were expanded. In 2001 the Towson Branch added a "medieval castle with arched windows, turrets and a majestic entrance" in the children's area of the library to, hopefully, "make more families decide to spend their together time at the library rather than at a mall." The following year, the Hereford Branch expanded "to 7,500 square feet" and extended operating hours 2006, with the Pikeville Branch expanded with a "$3.6 million expansion and renovation" and re-opened in July 2007. In 2009, the existing Perry Hall Branch "was replaced by the current 25,000 square foot green building" which currently sits on Honeygo Boulevard and the Cockeysville Branch was renovated.

In 2010, the Perry Hall Branch added a reading garden which includes "benches, sculptures...a picturesque view of the small nearby pond" and a walkway that is "made of recycled materials from the renovation of the North Point Branch plaza" the same year. Also that year, the Arbutus Branch moved to a new $11 million "library, community center and senior center" on Sulphur Spring Road, which is a 25,000 square foot space and is a certified LEED silver building. The following year, in 2011, The Baltimore Sun reported that an FBI agent, Kyra M. Dressler, "asked a federal judge to sign search warrants for computers and hard drives in the Baltimore County Public Library's branches in Woodlawn and Catonsville," where a Nicaraguan-born man named Antonio Martinez, who they suspected of being a "terrorist," had reportedly used the library's public computers. The same year "a $30 million, six-story building" which houses the Owings Mills Branch and the "center for the Community College of Baltimore County" began to be constructed, and was completed in 2013.

In 2013, the BCPL recorded "nearly 5 million in-person visits, circulated nearly 10.6 million items, set a record of over 48,400 participants in our Summer Reading Club, and added nearly 20,000 new cardholders" in the previous years. The following year, the Hubert V. Simmons Museum of Negro Leagues Baseball was established at the new Owings Mills Branch, opened only the year before, a free museum which is "open during all library operating hours" and has exhibits and historical displays of "Maryland and U.S. Negro Leagues." In September of the same year Richard William Parsons, a librarian who had worked in the BCPL library system since 1962, died. Due to a large snowstorm in March 2014, all BCPL branches were closed.

Also in 2014, Kevin Kamenetz proposed a controversial plan for shifting IT positions within the BCPL system. His budget involved the transfer of 28 positions within the system "to the county's Office of Information Technology (OIT) starting July 1" with administration officials saying it would make the government "more efficient" with no cuts in jobs, but library advocates across the state worried that this did not follow due process and set a bad precedent. Paula Miller, formerly the head of the Pikes Peak Library District in El Paso County, Colorado, was chosen as the new administrator of the BCPL library system. Not only was she "the first woman to serve in that role" but she was the fourth director of the system since 1948.

In 2015 and 2016, the Hereford Branch's renovation was sped up. In July 2015, a broken water pipe damaged the interior of the Branch, closing it for one year so it could "undergo the $3 million extensive renovation and expansion," and it was reopened in June 2016 with increased space for "books, computers and meeting areas," covering a total of 15,000 square feet, including "self-service kiosks for checking out books, several computers for public use, a bar with outlets for laptop use," among other aspects.

=== Unionization ===
In April 2021, several Maryland General Assembly legislators drafted and passed legislation, supported by workers and union officials, allowing Baltimore County Public Library staff to collectively bargain in April 2021. The bill gave the requirement that after union organizers collect signatures from 30% of a library systems employees, then at least 50% have to vote in favor of joining a union before negotiations with library administration begins. Prior to the bill's approval, libraries in Montgomery County and Prince George's County formed unions, while Baltimore County Public Library employees noted an intention to hold an election in September 2021.

On December 31, 2021, workers in Baltimore County Public Library (BCPL) system unionized with the International Association of Machinists and Aerospace Workers, after a several-year-long union drive. The union vote passed with a 77% approval rating.

On May 1, 2022, 460 BCPL employees, from the library's administrative office and 19 library branches, ratified "their first union contract" with overwhelming support. The agreement includes pay increases and paid leave for employees. On September 13, 2022, the financial portions of the first contract were ratified after Baltimore County Council approved money to be allocated for this purpose.

BCPL supervisory staff were granted collective bargaining rights in 2026 after the passage of HB0388/SB0253.

=== Layoffs ===
On November 12, 2025, Library CEO Sonia Alcántara-Antoine announced that the Baltimore County Public Library would be "phasing out" fourteen part-time librarians, effectively laying them off immediately. Library representatives stated that the previous administration had decided to phase out the position over a decade prior. Members of the Baltimore County Council criticized the move, citing the fact that the county budget provided funds to BCPL for these positions through the end of the fiscal year on June 30, 2026. Neither the county council nor the library's Board of Trustees were notified of the decision prior to the layoffs. IAM Local 4538, the union representing Baltimore County Public Library workers, also criticized the move and organized with allies to reinstate the librarians. Following significant public backlash, Alcántara-Antoine announced two days later on November 14 that BCPL would reinstate all fourteen librarians effective immediately.

On November 17, Alcántara-Antoine announced that BCPL Human Resources Director Robin Linton was no longer employed with the system, stating the "decision reflects our responsibility towards taking meaningful steps to rebuild confidence and trust within this organization.” The next day, Alcántara-Antoine faced further backlash at the BCPL Board of Trustees meeting, where members of IAM Local 4538, unionized library workers from other public library systems in Maryland, and community members voiced their concerns with the library's actions and Alcántara-Antoine leadership. On December 9, the BCPL Board of Trustees announced that they had parted ways with Alcántara-Antoine.

== Branches ==
The following BCPL branches are open to the public:

- Arbutus Branch
- Catonsville Branch
- Cockeysville Branch
- Essex Branch
- Hereford Branch
- Lansdowne Branch
- Loch Raven Branch
- North Point Branch
- Owings Mills Branch
- Parkville-Carney Branch
- Perry Hall Branch
- Pikesville Branch
- Randallstown Branch
- Reistertown Branch
- Rosedale Branch
- Sollers Point Branch
- Towson Branch
- White Marsh Branch
- Woodlawn Branch

Mobile libraries are also available for both adults and children, which visit senior retirement homes, assisted living facilities, special needs schools, and other places.

== Public services ==
The BCPL library system provides many public services. These include foreign language materials, local history resources, online databases, showing of films within library branches, and much more, in an effort to generate community participation.

=== Foreign languages and local history ===
Numerous foreign language resources are available across the library system. At the Cockeysville, Parkville, and Towson branches, Korean fiction and non-fiction books for adults and children are available, while the Pikesville, and Randallstown branches, Russian materials for adults and children can be found. At all branches, Spanish children's books, mainly picture books, in Spanish and bi-lingual Spanish and English can be found, while at the Catonsville, Essex, North Point, and Towson branches Spanish collections of fiction and non-fiction for adults and older children can be requested. As of 2016, the Rosetta Stone program is "available for free" within BCPL branches.

Local history can be accessed across the library system. A collection of local historic photographs with annotations are included in Legacy Web, Baltimore County Public Library's online photo archive, with these photographs covering most aspects of life in Baltimore County for the last 130 years. In April 2010, the images in the Legacy Web were added to the Baltimore County Public Library online catalog. The Arbutus, Catonsville, and Reisterstown branches house historical archives on the local communities they serve. The local community history information may include rare and out-of-print books, newspaper clippings, and historical prints of local sites. These materials can be used within specific branches and are sometimes accessible with prior appointment at the appropriate BCPL branch.

=== Databases and movie showings ===
Many databases are available to patrons across the BCPL library system. A variety of online databases are available for use, which include information on health, business, homework topics, and test preparation. Most databases provide access to articles in magazines, newspapers, and encyclopedias and can be used for research, schoolwork or other needs since they can be accessed from a BCPL branch or from home, work or school through the official BCPL website with a BCPL card. Such services are accompanied by "public computers, free WiFi, laptop bars with charging stations...study rooms, a quiet reading room...single use and collaborative workspaces" at Randallstown and other BCPL branches. The BCPL has also partnered with the Baltimore County Bar Association to host a "Baltimore County Pro Bono Day" at BCPL's Owings Mills Branch to discuss legal problems with a volunteer attorney. Additionally, the BCPL had partnered with WBAL-TV to promote reading for the "2017 Baltimore County Public Library Reading Challenge."

Current Hollywood films, documentary and non-documentary, are sometimes shown within branches of the BCPL to the broader community. In March 2017, the Arbutus, Loch Raven, North Point, Pikesville, Reisterstown, Rosedale, Towson, and Woodlawn BCPL branches invited the public (and general community) to view, free-of-charge, Ava DuVernay's documentary 13TH, which explores "ties between slavery, the current mass incarceration of African Americans and the profits of the prison-industrial complex," which was followed by "a guided discussion."

=== Other community activities ===
The BCPL also engages in varying activities to engage the community. Over the years, branches have had interactive displays about outer space, held a behind-the-scenes open house for the library system's bookmobile, and hosted cartoonist Kevin Kallaugher (KAL), Other programs have included working with members of the cast of Annie who performed in White Marsh Mall to promote the BCPL's summer reading program, publishing a directory of "more than 3,500 nonprofit organizations in the county," and having a "presentation and discussion on recent research in reading and education."

== Foundation for Baltimore County Public Library ==
The Foundation for Baltimore County Public Library provides "funding for projects that encourage children and young adults to cultivate enthusiasm for reading and learning" such as the Storyville, My First Library Card and Summer Reading Club programs, along with raising "funds for programs or projects that enhance systemwide library goals and objectives." In order to provide "additional resources to enrich the library's commitment to empower the citizens of Baltimore County" to learn, create, connect, and explore, it is registered 501(c)(3) organization.

In particular, the Storyville program, created with the funding of the Foundation, BCPL, State of Maryland, and private sources, has been a resounding success. Designed and created "to foster early literacy and school readiness skills," it serves as a place "where books and purposeful play come together to provide valuable experiences that nurture young children and support parents and caregivers." It is located at the Woodlawn and Rosedale Branches of the BCPL. Jim Fish, the longtime administrator of the BCPL, who retired in 2014, also counts "the library's work on early childhood services among his most important accomplishments" which includes the Storyville program.

In July 2010, the president of the Foundation, Jeffrey Smith, wrote a letter to the editors of The Baltimore Sun, stating that the addition the Cockeysville Branch would "allow for an increase in total public space in this library while also offering the chance to improve and maximize overall public accessibility" and that such improvements are only the "most recent in a series of investments in the system," and arguing that despite the fact that the times are "economically challenging," libraries are vital, and thanked residents of the county and local elected officials for having "the foresight to ensure sufficient funding to support this growth in use." He further argued that this meant that there was "recognition of the importance of libraries as an essential public service will allow BCPL to continue to effectively respond to the increasing needs of Baltimore County citizens."

In 2014, the vice president of the Baltimore County Chamber of Commerce, Christine Crawford, who had joined the Chamber of Commerce in July 2005 and represents the chamber in many capacities, became a board member of the foundation. At the time, the president of the Foundation, Jeffrey Smith, welcomed Crawford, saying that "it is truly an honor to welcome" her to the board and that he was "confident that her enthusiasm, extensive connections and civic-minded spirit will be invaluable assets as our organization continuously broadens its capacity to support the good works" of the BCPL library system.

== See also ==
- List of libraries
- Baltimore County, Maryland
- Maryland
- Public library
