= Northern Parkway (Baltimore) =

Street in Maryland, United States

Coordinates: 39°21′43.1″N 76°37′34″W

- Maintained by: Baltimore DOT
- Location: Baltimore
- West end: MD 26 in Baltimore
- Major junctions: MD 140 in Baltimore; I-83 in Baltimore; MD 25 in Baltimore; MD 139 in Baltimore; MD 45 in Baltimore; MD 542 in Baltimore; MD 147 in Baltimore
- East end: US 1 in Baltimore

Northern Parkway is a major road that runs west–east across the northern part of the city Baltimore. For most of the way, it is at least six lanes wide, and it is used by motorists for crosstown travel. It is designated E. Northern Pkwy and W. Northern Pkwy with Charles Street being the dividing line. It was constructed in the 1950s through several neighborhoods and several homes were razed in the process from right-of-way. The section of E. Northern Pkwy from Harford Road to Fleetwood Ave was originally called German Lane.

== Route description ==
Northern Parkway starts at an at-grade intersection with Liberty Heights Avenue (MD 26) in Northwest Baltimore near the community of Lochearn. The road heads northeast as a six lane divided boulevard, passing through some residential areas before meeting Wabash Avenue. Shortly after, Northern Parkway intersects Reisterstown Road (MD 140) and Park Heights Avenue (MD 129). The road then veers northeast and intersects Pimlico Road. Afterwards, it curves east and meets I-83 (Jones Fall Expressway) at a modified partial cloverleaf interchange and meets Falls Rd (MD 25) immediately after the interchange. After its intersections with Roland Avenue and Charles Street (MD 139), Northern Parkway temporarily reduces to a four-lane undivided road. Afterwards, it meets Bellona Avenue and expands to six lanes after the intersection. Then, it meets York Road (MD 45) and Loch Raven Boulevard (MD 542), which provides access to I-695 (Baltimore Beltway). Northern Parkway veers northeast and crosses over Perring Parkway (MD 41). There is no direct access to MD 41, so missing movements are made via McLean Boulevard. Its lasts major intersections are The Alameda, Harford Road (MD 147), and Walther Avenue before splitting into two one-way streets near its eastern terminus with Bel Air Road (US 1) near Overlea, Maryland. The eastbound section becomes Fleetwood Ave at the intersection while the westbound portion remains E. Northern Parkway; however its former name was Maple Ave.

== History ==
Parts of E. Northern Parkway used to be Belvedere Avenue (parts of West Belvedere Avenue and East Belvedere Avenue still remain). Between 1950 and 1976, parts of Northern Parkway were expanded to six lanes with a median from Bellona Avenue east. Northern Parkway was built in various stages extending west from Old Harford Road to Hillen Road from the early 1950s to 1965. In 1973-75, work on the new section near York Road resulted in the demolition of businesses along York Road north of Belvedere Avenue, with at least one east west alley also being vacated by the city of Baltimore. The part of Northern Parkway near York Road was opened to traffic in December 1976; the section between The Alameda and Chinquapin Parkway was completed in June 1975. The original plan included for W. Northern Parkway to pass through Powder Mill park and connect to Security Blvd near the unfinished I-70 interchange in Gwynns Falls Park.

In 2011 the Television show Extreme Home Makeover built a home on a vacant corner lot in the 3800 block of Fleetwood Ave. Several production trucks were housed on E. Northern Pkwy.

== Junction list ==
The entire route is in Baltimore.

mi	km	Destinations	Notes
0.00	0.00	MD 26 (Liberty Heights Avenue) – Eldersburg	Western terminus
1.07	1.72	Wabash Avenue	
1.42	2.29	MD 140 (Reisterstown Road) – Baltimore, Owings Mills	
1.88	3.03	MD 129 (Park Heights Avenue) – Pikesville, Glyndon	
2.71	4.36	Pimlico Road	
3.18	5.12	Belvedere Avenue to Hospital	
3.88	6.24	I-83 (Jones Falls Expressway) – Baltimore, Brooklandville	I-83 Exit 10
4.18	6.73	MD 25 (Falls Road) – Baltimore, Brooklandville	
4.80	7.72	Roland Avenue	
5.33	8.58	MD 139 (Charles Street) – Towson, Timonium	
5.86	9.43	(Bellona Avenue) to MD 134 north – Brooklandville	
6.17	9.93	MD 45 (York Rd) – Baltimore, Towson	
7.08	11.39	The Alameda	
7.50	12.07	MD 542 (Loch Raven Boulevard) to I-695 – Towson	
8.19	13.18	MD 41 south (Perring Pkwy) – Carney	Westbound entrance only
8.53	13.73	(McLean Boulevard) to MD 41 (Perring Pkwy) – Carney	
9.04	14.55	Old Harford Road	
9.41	15.14	MD 147 (Harford Road) – Baltimore, Carney	
10.22	16.45	Walther Avenue	end of eastbound
10.70	17.22	US 1 (Belair Rd) – Elkridge, Perry Hall	eastern terminus; no direct access to Northern Parkway eastbound from US 1.
1.000 mi = 1.609 km; 1.000 km = 0.621 mi: Incomplete access

== Points of interest ==
Notable Landmarks from East to West on or near W. & E. Northern Parkway include:

- Northern Parkway Jr High
- Norman Carlberg Sculpture at the entrance of Northern Parkway Junior High
- Mount Pleasant Park and Golf Course Where in 1956, Arnold Palmer secured his second win on the professional golf tour. Mount Pleasant is a Golf Digest 4-star rated golf course and was ranked 12th Best Municipal Golf Course in the United States by Golf week Magazine.
- Northern High School
- Mercy High School
- Chinquapin Park
- Senator Theater
- Gilman School
- Bryn Mawr School
- Roland Park Country School
- St. Mary's Seminary the first ecclesiastical faculty in the United States with the right to grant degrees in the name of the Holy See.
- The Cathedral of Mary Our Queen
- Pimlico Middle School
- Pimlico Race Course
- Polk Audio Headquarters
- Rogers Avenue Metro Subway Station
- Sinai Hospital

== Public transportation ==
There is no single bus line that travels the entire length of Northern Parkway. However, there are buses operating on various portions of the route, operated by the Maryland Transit Administration.

From Reisterstown Road to York Road, service is provided by Route 44. Route 36 operates from York Road to The Alameda, and Route 55 from McLean Boulevard to Belair Road, and Route 58 operates the longest distance of all, serving all points east of Falls Road. All other areas of Northern Parkway are within a close walk of a bus line.

In addition, there are many lines that either cross or operate on small portions of Northern Parkway. These include Routes 1, 3, 8, 11, 15, 19, 27, 52, 53, 54, 61, and 91.

The Rogers Avenue Metro Subway Station is located near Northern Parkway, and the Mt. Washington Light Rail Stop is about a mile away.

Route 66 once operated along Northern Parkway from Springlake Way to Belair Road, but this was eliminated in 1993. Route M-8 ran along Northern Parkway from Wabash Avenue to Liberty Road until it was rerouted in 2005.
