= Perring-Loch, Baltimore =

Coordinates: 39.353°N 76.585°W

Perring-Loch is a small community located in northeast Baltimore, Maryland, United States. Perring Parkway serves as its eastern border and Loch Raven Boulevard as its western border; hence the name Perring-Loch. Woodbourne Avenue and Hartsdale Road are the northern and southern boundaries respectively. The entire community is with the 21239 postal zip code and is served by the Perring Loch community association.

== Demographics ==
According to the 2000 US Census, 2728 people live in Perring-Loch, with more than 85% African-American and fewer than 10% White. The median household income is $53,722.

== See also ==
- List of Baltimore neighborhoods
