= Benson, Harford County, Maryland =

Unincorporated community in Maryland, United States

- Unincorporated community
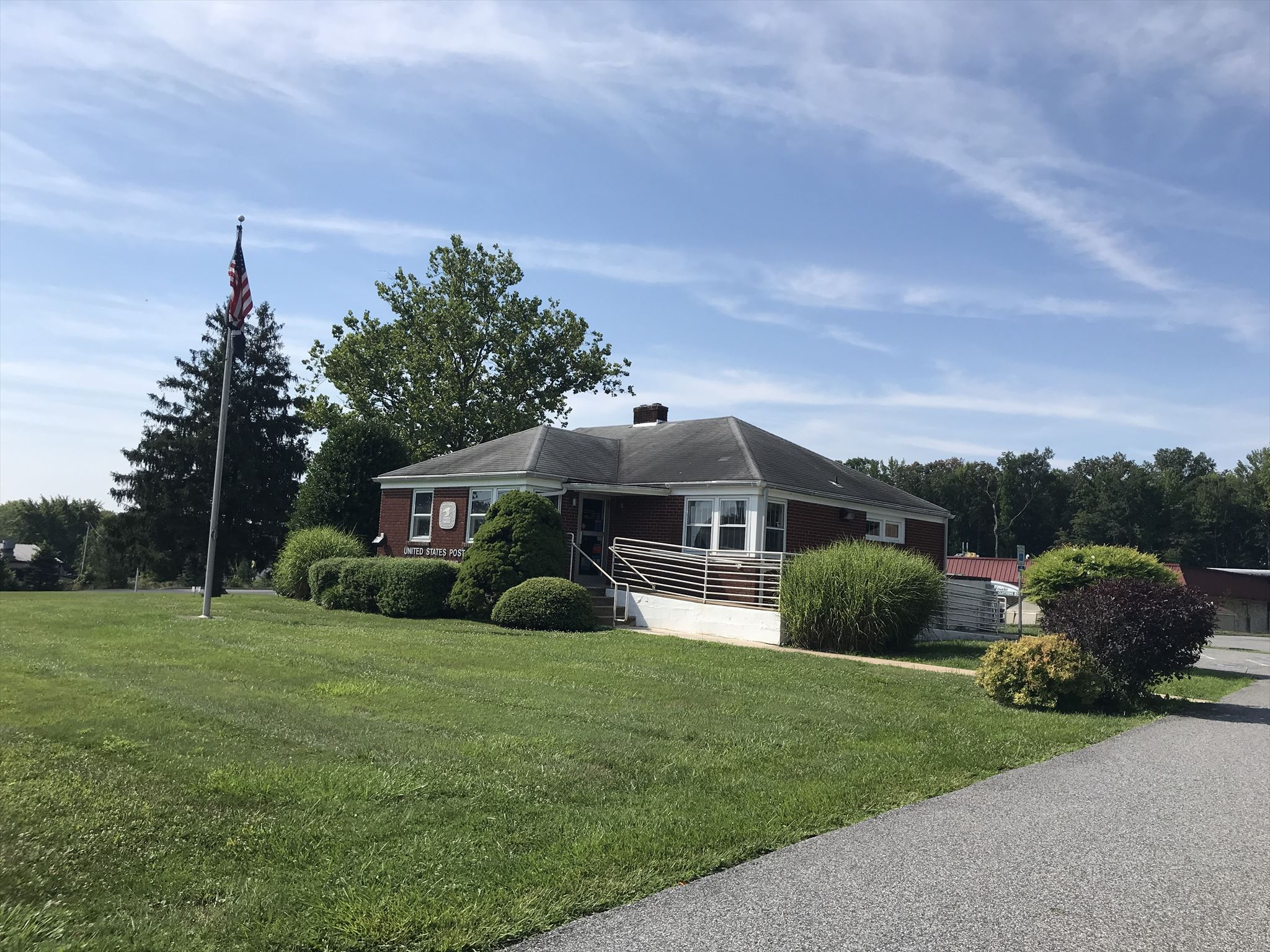
- Benson, Maryland Post Office (2021).

- Location within Maryland Location within the United States
- Coordinates: 39°30′19″N 76°23′11″W
- Country: United States
- State: Maryland
- County: Harford
- Elevation: 440 ft (130 m)
- Time zone: UTC−5 (Eastern (EST))
  - Summer (DST): UTC−4 (EDT)
- ZIP code: 21018
- Area codes: 410, 443 & 667
- GNIS feature ID: 583160

Benson is an unincorporated community in Harford County, Maryland, United States. Benson is located at the Harford county junction of U.S. Route 1 and Maryland Route 147, 3 miles (4.8 km) southwest of Bel Air and 19.45 miles (31.3 km) northeast of Baltimore. Benson has a post office with ZIP code 21018 and is served by the Area Codes 410, 443 and 667.

== History ==
The unincorporated community of Benson had a population of 42 people in 1895 with a functioning Post Office but no railroad services according to the Rand McNally Atlas.
