= Old Harford Road =

Road in Maryland, U.S.

Route information
- Maintained by Baltimore DOT and Baltimore County
- Length: 5.3 mi (8.5 km)

Major junctions
- South end: MD 147 in Hamilton, Baltimore City
- Northern Parkway in Hamilton; Taylor Avenue in Parkville; Joppa Road (former MD 148) in Carney
- North end: The Charles Hickey School in Cub Hill, Maryland

Location
- Country: United States
- State: Maryland
- County: City of Baltimore and Baltimore

Highway system
- County Roads in City of Baltimore and Baltimore County

Old Harford Road, one of the oldest continuously used rights-of-way in central Maryland, United States, is a southwest–northeast thoroughfare in northeast Baltimore City and eastern Baltimore County.

Present-day Old Harford Road begins in the 6000 block of Harford Road in the Hamilton section of Baltimore City and continues nearly 5 1/2 miles northeast through the Parkville and Carney areas of Baltimore County to near the Big Gunpowder Falls north of Cub Hill. Old Harford Road serves as an alternate route to both Harford Road (Maryland Route 147) and Perring Parkway (Maryland Route 41), and carries between 10,000 and 16,500 vehicles per day. Old Harford Road, like Harford County, was named for Henry Harford (1758–1834), the son of Frederick Calvert, 6th Lord Baltimore, and the last Proprietary of Maryland prior to the American Revolutionary War.

== History ==
Old Harford Road follows a curving path along relatively high land bordering streams that feed the upper Chesapeake Bay, including Chinquapin Run. This suggests its likely origin as an Indian trail that subsequently was adopted by settlers to convey farm products from northeastern Baltimore County, Harford County, and southern Pennsylvania to the port of Baltimore in the late 18th century.

The name "Old Harford Road" appears on area maps dating to at least 1850 (see, for example, map display in the Meeting Room of the Baltimore County Public Library in Towson, Maryland). In particular, the 1850 J. C. Sidney map indicates that today's Satyr Hill Road, Cromwell Bridge Road north of Satyr Hill, and Glen Arm Roads collectively were known as Old Harford Road. Four sections of the Sidney map, annotated to highlight the location of today's Old Harford Road with respect to area roads of today—and to the Old Harford Road of 1850—are provided below. Nineteenth century deeds to two notable properties in the area, obtained by the late Baltimore County historian John W. McGrain, substantiate Sidney's depiction of Old Harford Road. The "Shanklin House" (or "Forest Hall"), once located at present-day 8906 Satyr Hill Road, and "Serendipity", on present-day Glen Arm Road, north of Glen View, are both listed as being located on "The Old Harford Road". The Shanklin House once served as a tavern, and its 1845 deed notes that the property was located on "the well-traveled main road". Old Harford Road also appears on Robert Taylor's 1857 map of Baltimore County (not shown here). The map depicts "Carroll's Factory", a woolen mill later converted to a flour mill, where the road crossed the south bank of Gunpowder Falls. Some of the structures of this property remain extant as a private residence along Cub Hill Road, just east of today's Cromwell Bridge Road (originally, Old Harford Road).

The Old in Old Harford Road most likely dates to the period shortly after the completion of the Harford Turnpike by private road-building interests in 1816. Harford Turnpike, now known as Harford Road (Maryland Route 147), was constructed as a more direct route between present-day Mt. Vista Road and what became the Hamilton section of Baltimore (i.e., to today's intersection of Harford and Old Harford Roads). Further evidence that today's Cromwell Bridge and Glen Arm Roads comprise part of the original Old Harford Road is provided by the 1829 edition of the Laws of the Maryland General Assembly; Chapter 224 describes the construction of a county roadway (likely today's Cub Hill Road) that was to extend from "... the Old Harford Road near Cromwell's Bridge (Gunpowder Falls) to the Harford Turnpike". A complicating bit of information regarding the use of the moniker "Old", however, is provided by a genealogical reference to a tavern that was said to have been located on Old Harford Road "near the Long Green Valley" around 1776. Why the prefix "Old" would have been used at that early date is uncertain. If the reference is accurate, it could reflect that a displacement of the original Harford Road right-of-way already had been made prior to the construction of the Harford Turnpike in 1816.

While the name "Old Harford" may be traced with certainty to only the first third of the nineteenth century, the right-of-way itself is older. For example, the 1794 map of Maryland by Dennis Griffith (shown below) depicts a thoroughfare extending northeast from the central part of Baltimore City into Harford County, Maryland. This road is distinct from nearby roads that evolved into parts of today's Belair Road (U.S. Route 1), Philadelphia Road (Maryland Route 7), and York Road (Maryland Route 45). The shape and orientation of the unnamed right-of-way bears close resemblance to that of today's Old Harford Road. Anthony Finley's 1824 map of Maryland, schematically depicts a route of travel extending north-northeast from Baltimore City to the Coopstown area of western Harford County (near today's Jarrettsville). Subsequent editions of his map and others (e.g., see those by Thomas Cowperthwait (1865) and Thomas Letts (1883) also shown below) extend the route northeastward to the Susquehanna River at McCall's Ferry in York County, Pennsylvania --- and even beyond the Susquehanna into adjacent Lancaster County. These routes likely incorporated parts of today's Long Green Pike and Pleasantville Road in Baltimore and Harford Counties.

Through the first half of the twentieth century, various published maps—including state-issued topographic maps (see example below)—indicate that the portion of today's Cub Hill Road between Old Harford Road and Cromwell Bridge Road / Glen Arm Road was known as "Old Harford Road." This observation, in conjunction with the more widely-known fact that all or parts of today's Satyr Hill, Cromwell Bridge, and Glen Arm Roads were once labeled "Old Harford," suggests that Old Harford Road is an example of a "braided" thoroughfare. "Braided" roads were those whose names were conferred informally (i.e., by local usage) to separate but roughly parallel roadway segments that temporarily diverged but subsequently rejoined. Together, the briefly-separate rights-of-way constituted a single main path of travel. In the case of Old Harford Road, it appears that parts of today's Satyr Hill, Cromwell Bridge, and Cub Hill Roads --- along with that part of Old Harford Road between Satyr Hill and Cub Hill - together once constituted a braided right-of way. With the official naming of rural thoroughfares by municipal governments following the advent of motor vehicles in the early 1900s, unique names typically were conferred to "braided" roadway segments to minimize traveler confusion.

Available records suggest that, like similar roads in the region, Old Harford Road likely remained gravel-covered as late as World War I. Some sections, however, may have been macadamized by that time. Asphalt pavement was most likely introduced in the Hamilton and Parkville sections beginning in the 1920s. The "Second Report on the Highways of Maryland," included as part of Volume 4 of the 1902 Report of the Maryland State Geological Survey notes that the Ninth District of Baltimore County spent $1124 to "top-dress" part of Old Harford Road with gravel stone in 1901. Comparable or greater amounts were also spent the same year on Hillen Road, Arlington Avenue, Hamilton Avenue, and Roland Avenue. By 1927, aerial views of eastern Baltimore County (see below) suggest that all parts of today's Old Harford Road had been paved.

In 1921, on the part of Old Harford Road that by that time had come to be known as Glen Arm Road, what generally is accepted to be the nation's first train-actuated railroad crossing signal was installed at the crossing of the Maryland and Pennsylvania Railroad in the community of Glen Arm. The signal device was designed and installed by the short line railroad's noteworthy Superintendent of Signals, Charles Adler Jr. The approach of a train activated a double stop sign that turned toward the road twenty seconds before the arrival of a train. Adler later designed early traffic-actuated traffic lights for the City of Baltimore, and also invented the system of flashing warning lights used on aircraft.

Present-day sections of Old Harford Road have never been part of the highway system administered by the Maryland State Highway Administration (SHA). However, around 1910, parts of existing courses of the road—namely, today's Cub Hill Road and parts of Glen Arm Road—were considered for possible inclusion in the state system by SHA's forerunner, the Maryland State Roads Commission The State Roads Commission at the time was examining existing roadways to serve as connecting routes and/or partial alternatives to today's Belair Road (U.S. Route 1) that links Baltimore City with the city of Bel Air, Maryland. Ultimately, the right-of-way of the former Harford Turnpike from Parkville north to Benson (just south of Bel Air) was selected as the primary alternative; this route was designated Maryland 147, a designation that continues today.

Structural development along Old Harford Road through the years largely has mirrored that experienced along other major roads in the region. From the late 18th century through much of the following one, "development" consisted primarily of the well-appointed homes of merchants and other wealthy individuals who conducted business in Baltimore. For example, the estates of both Revolutionary War hero General Samuel Smith, and Baltimore benefactor Johns Hopkins were located on that part of today's Harford Road near Hillen Road. Interspersed between these and other, lesser estates were the truck farms that supplied fruit, vegetables, and dairy products to Baltimore City. The term "truck" referred to the fact that the farm products quickly had to be moved to avoid spoilage. By the late 1800s, truck farming had come to dominate growth and development patterns in the region. Villages arose along (Old) Harford Road as well as along the nearby York, Belair, and Philadelphia Roads to support the growing needs of the farmers. Beginning with the extension of streetcar service from Herring Run to Hamilton in 1898, and its subsequent extension to Carney in 1904, the southernmost portions of Old Harford Road saw development as a "streetcar suburb" during the first two decades of the 20th century. The earliest of these were situated on acre or near acre-size lots, as shown in the example below located at 6707 Old Harford Road. But in the 1920s, developers further subdivided the truck farms and other larger properties into smaller lots, onto which were built many "bungalow"-style homes that were within easy walking distance of the extended streetcar line (see first black-and-white image below). Such construction spread as far north along Old Harford as the Harford Park community near Taylor Avenue. The next major surge in development occurred in the two decades following World War II. During this period, much of the remainder of today's Old Harford Road experienced the post-war building boom in the form of moderately-priced ranch and two story homes (see images below). A limited amount of modern "in-fill" construction continues today north of Joppa Road in Carney (e.g., the "Old Harford Ridge" subdivision near Proctor Lane).

Post-war suburban development brought substantial traffic increases to Old Harford Road, especially in the Parkville-Carney area. The completion of Parkville High School in 1958 and the Perring Plaza Shopping Center in 1962, in particular, spurred commercial development along Old Harford near its intersection with today's Putty Hill Avenue. Major improvements (including widening, resurfacing and construction of curbs/sewers) along Old Harford occurred over various segments in the following years: 1971 (north of Joppa Road), 1972 (north of Taylor Avenue), 1975 (north of Proctor Lane), 1979 (intersection with Joppa Road), 1981 (near Summit Avenue), 1984 (Northern Parkway to Alvarado Square), 1990 (Satyr Hill Road to Joppa Road), 2000–2001 (Taylor Avenue to Putty Hill Avenue), and 2025 (Harford Road to Northern Parkway, including addition of shoulder markings). Construction of an overpass at the Baltimore Beltway (Interstate 695) in 1961 resulted in relocation of the roadway about 300 feet (91 m) west of the original right-of-way. This reconstruction also eliminated an existing "y" intersection with Satyr Hill Road. The relationship of present-day Old Harford Road with neighboring streets and highways is depicted in the sectional SHA map shown below.

The SHA recently completed widening of Interstate 695 Baltimore Beltway between Perring Parkway and Harford Road. This project included replacement of the original (1961) Old Harford Road - Interstate 695 overpass. Old Harford Road remained open during the reconstruction. The east half of the new overpass opened to traffic on June 1, 2016; the project was completed in June 2017. The enlarged overpass was made 85 feet longer and 4 feet higher than the existing span to accommodate auxiliary lanes and possible future expansion of the Beltway. The three lanes of traffic on Old Harford Road include through lanes in each direction and a third for left turns onto Satyr Hill Road. The bridge also provides shoulders for bicycles and ADA-compliant sidewalks on both sides; several views of the new overpass appear below. On November 21, 2014, during the early stages of the construction project, the original Old Harford Road overpass was struck by a backhoe being carried by a westbound flatbed truck on the Beltway. The incident caused no injuries but required temporary closing of both the Beltway and Old Harford Road so that damage to the bridge could be inspected.

== Mass transit ==
At present, no scheduled, public transportation exists along Old Harford Road. However, for more than 30 years, two branches of the Maryland Transit Administration's Route 19 bus line operated along parts of Old Harford Road. The 19A line, introduced in 1973, originated at the Carney Park-and-Ride lot at the intersection of Harford Road (Maryland Route 147) and Joppa Road. This line replaced a route originated by the former McMahon Transportation Service Company. Like its predecessor, the line followed Old Harford Road from Cub Hill Road south to Moore Avenue/Oakleigh Road, before continuing to downtown Baltimore via Taylor Avenue, Burke Avenue, Stevenson Lane, and Charles Street. The express-type service included single morning and evening trips. The line was renamed Route 105 in 2000 before being discontinued due to low ridership in 2005.

Another branch of Route 19, referred to as the "Joppa Heights" line, operated along Old Harford Road between Taylor Avenue and Satyr Hill Road. It was introduced in early 1976 and enjoyed moderate ridership in its earlier years, providing service between the Joppa Road/Perring Plaza shopping areas and downtown Baltimore several times a day. This route, however, also suffered declining ridership in more recent years, and was discontinued in 2009.

== Points of interest ==
Sites of historical note on Old Harford Road are listed below (south to north); the first four and the Pine Grove School are on the Baltimore County, Maryland Landmarks List:

- The 19th century Krause lime kiln (near Summit Avenue; image below). The stone arch kiln burned wood to generate heat for the pulverization of limestone into lime. This process took two to three days, and lime obtained from the kiln was used to reduce soil acidity of area vegetable farms. The kiln was restored by the county in 1979 and is now part of Krause Memorial Park. A United States National Geodetic Survey benchmark (related to the 1844 survey marker discussed in the two entries immediately below) is located just north of the kiln on the east side of Old Harford Road; the site is 484 feet above mean sea level.
- The Cub Hill House at 9301 Old Harford Road (just north of Summit Avenue; image below). This late 18th century - early 19th century Federal-style stone structure was once the center of Cub Hill Farm, complete with blacksmith and wheelwright shops, greenhouses and tenant houses. In the mid-19th century a wooden addition (no longer extant) at the west end of the house served as a general store and as the Cub Hill Post Office. The Cub Hill land grant of which Cub Hill Farm was a part dates to the late 17th century. The farm gradually shrank from about 1,000 acres (4.0 km^{2}) to just 50 acres (200,000 m^{2}) when the last owners to farm it (the Macklins) sold it for development in 1952. Cub Hill House and 2 acres (8,100 m^{2}) of the farm have been owned by the Old family since that time.
- A marker that formed part of the "Atlantic Base Line" of the United States Coast and Geodetic Survey's (USC&GS) transcontinental triangulation survey of the United States was established on the Cub Hill House property in 1844. At the time, the property was known as the Finlay Farm. The survey marker, which appears as "Finlay" on the 1855 USC&GS map shown below, was located about 250 feet west-northwest of the farm's blacksmith shop. An 1896 USC&GS update on the triangulation effort noted that the site's neighboring survey markers located in Kent and Queen Anne's counties on Maryland's Eastern Shore could no longer be found. Those markers, on Swan Point and Kent Island, respectively, also had been established in the 1840s. By 1896, however, as a result of rising sea levels and the long-term subsidence of tidewater land, the Eastern Shore sites had become submerged.
- The Shanklin-Carroll-Longbottom homestead (just south of Waldor Drive). The land grant of which the home is a part dates to 1695. In 1845, 50 acres (200,000 m^{2}) of the original 500-acre (2.0 km^{2}) tract known as "Bear Neck" was purchased by John Wesley Shanklin. Shanklin enlarged the original home, believed to have been built in the early 19th century, and operated a general store.
- The superstructure of one of the Maryland State Forest Service's former network of fire lookout towers (at 9405 Old Harford Road; image below). The tower, at the Maryland Department of Natural Resource's Cub Hill Ranger Station, is located at one of the highest points in eastern Baltimore County (484 feet above sea level). Built in the 1930s, the 125-foot (38 m) structure has not been used for lookout purposes since 1972. Shortly after World War II, the tower also served as a relay link in the first generation microwave communication network built by the Western Union Telegraph Company for testing the long-distance transmission of television programs; documentation of that network appears in an appendix to the Historic American Engineering Record (HAER) report prepared by David S. Rotenstein for the National Park Service in 2006 The structure is now used for other communication purposes. The tower and its surrounding grounds also serve as an ecological and atmospheric research facility of the Maryland Department of Natural Resources in cooperation with the U.S. Forest Service. Carbon dioxide (CO_{2}), ozone (O_{3}), and ultraviolet (UV) radiation are monitored at the site.
- The 1860 Pine Grove School (at Cub Hill Road). This one-room school house at the southeast corner of Old Harford and Cub Hill Roads was sold in 1939, and is now a private residence.
- The Maryland State Training School For Boys (one-half mile north of Cub Hill Road). This facility, now known as The Charles H. Hickey School after a former Baltimore County sheriff, originated as a house of refuge in southwest Baltimore. It moved to its present location at the north end of Old Harford Road in 1910, and contains several buildings displaying what might be termed "early 20th century institutional" architecture. In recent years the facility has been the subject of various proposals for conversion to other uses.

Places of worship, schools, fire and police stations, and businesses on Old Harford Road, listed from south to north, appear below; parenthetical numbers are addresses on Old Harford Road

- Hamilton Branch of the Enoch Pratt Free Library (at intersection with Harford Road and Glenmore Avenue)
- Calvary Tabernacle (6010). The current structure, completed in 1983, replaced an 1874 structure (see images below) built on land donated by Robert Moore at "Five-mile Hill" in Baltimore County. The building originally served as a mission of St. Thomas Church, Baltimore City; it later become Saint Andrew's Chapel and Episcopal Church. The Saint Andrew congregation was absorbed by the Church of the Messiah when that congregation moved to its present nearby location on Harford Road in 1922. The 1874 structure then served as the Fourth Church of Christ, Scientist, Baltimore. The building subsequently was leased to Baltimore City for use as a primary school, and later still to the local Democratic Club and other organizations before becoming the Calvary Tabernacle.
- Refreshing Springs Baptist Church Church (6020 (at Roselawn Avenue)); former location of Calvary Lutheran Church (see below)
- Hamilton Elementary / Middle School (6101 (at Christopher Avenue)); constructed in 1927, with addition in 1934
- Hamilton Assembly of God Church (6508 (near Pinewood Avenue))
- Calvary Lutheran Church and School (southwest corner with Northern Parkway); church building opened in 1951; additions made in 1957, 1969, and 1997 (original Calvary Lutheran Church located at 6020 Old Harford Road through 1950)
- Transmitting tower (8510 (across from Ridge Gardens apartment complex)); the structure, 92 m (276 ft) tall and erected in c. 1964, is used for cell phone and other communication circuits. The top part of the tower was re-built after it collapsed onto the Sunbelt Rentals equipment facility located near the base of the tower during a severe thunderstorm on March 8, 2008. No deaths or injuries occurred, but the Baltimore County Fire Department and Baltimore Gas & Electric Company were called to the scene to investigate an associated gas leak.
- The Parkville Precinct (#8) of the Baltimore County Police Department, (8532 (southwest corner with Putty Hill Avenue)); completed in October 1954, a new 17,000-square-foot (1,600 m^{2}) facility was dedicated at the same location in August 2007
- The Parkville station (#10) of the Baltimore County Fire Department (southwest corner with Putty Hill Avenue); completed in October 1954, the station occupied a brand-new facility adjacent to the Parkville police department in September 2005; the fire bell in front of building was formerly used at the original Parkville fire station on Harford Road (Note: When the 1954 combined Parkville fire and police facility was constructed in 1954, Putty Hill Avenue (then known as Putty Hill Road) ended at Old Harford Road; an existing dead-end street known as "Miller Avenue" was removed by Putty Hill's extension west of Old Harford Road around 1960)
- Putty Hill Shopping Center (southeast corner with Putty Hill Avenue)
- Morningside House (8800 (at Lakewood Drive)); nursing facility opened in 1991 on site of former commercial green houses
- Harford Hills Elementary School (8902 (near Joppa Road))
- Atonement Lutheran Church and school (9121 (south of Proctor Lane))
- Pine Grove Middle School (9200 (at Proctor Lane))
- Saint Isaac Jogues Roman Catholic Church (9215 (north of Proctor Lane)); church building opened in 1970
- Loch Raven Presbyterian Church (9318 (north of Summit Avenue)); church building opened in September 1991 on grounds of former 19th-century farmhouse
- Water storage tower, City of Baltimore Department of Public Works (1/4 mile north of Cub Hill Road)

== Maps and images (images arranged by location, from south to north) ==
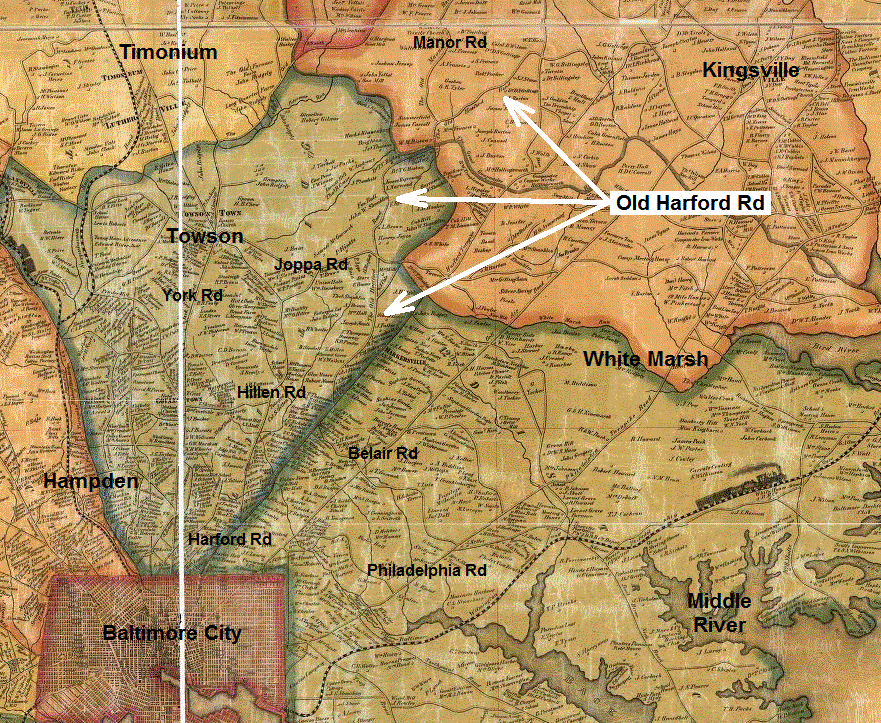
Large section of the 1850 J. C. Sidney "Map of Baltimore County," showing area from Baltimore City northeast to the Little Gunpowder River (Harford County line). Annotations illustrate the relationship of mid-nineteenth century Old Harford Road to present-day Harford, Old Harford, Satyr Hill, Cromwell Bridge, and Glen Arm Roads. With the exception of "Old Harford Road" label highlighted in white, road and place-name annotations are present-day. Close-up sections of the same map, arranged from southwest to northeast and with slightly different annotations, appear in the next three images.

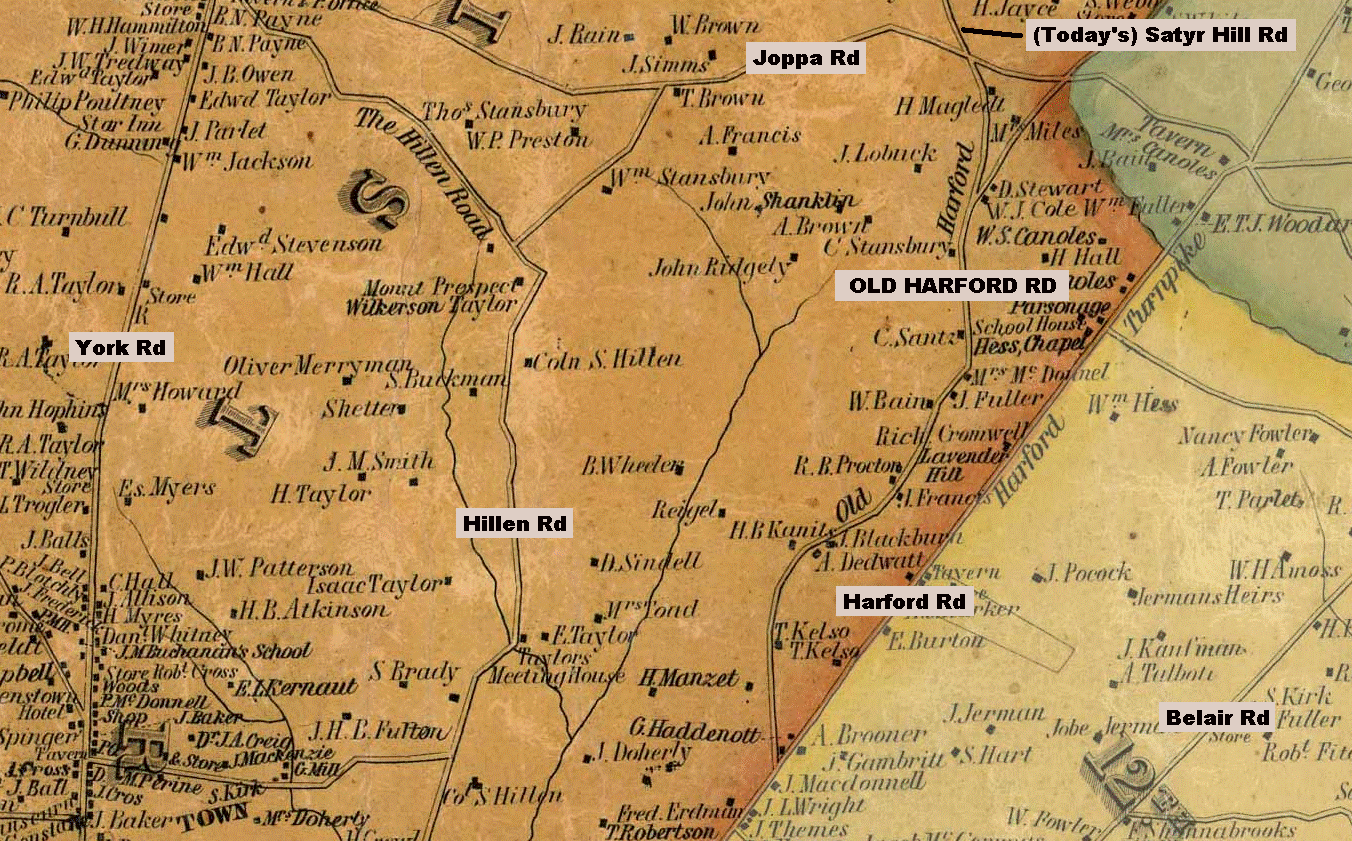
Close-up section of 1850 Sidney "Map of Baltimore County," showing parts of northeast Baltimore City and Baltimore County to illustrate that present-day Satyr Hill Road is part of the original Old Harford Road. Various color shadings depict election districts as they existed at the time.

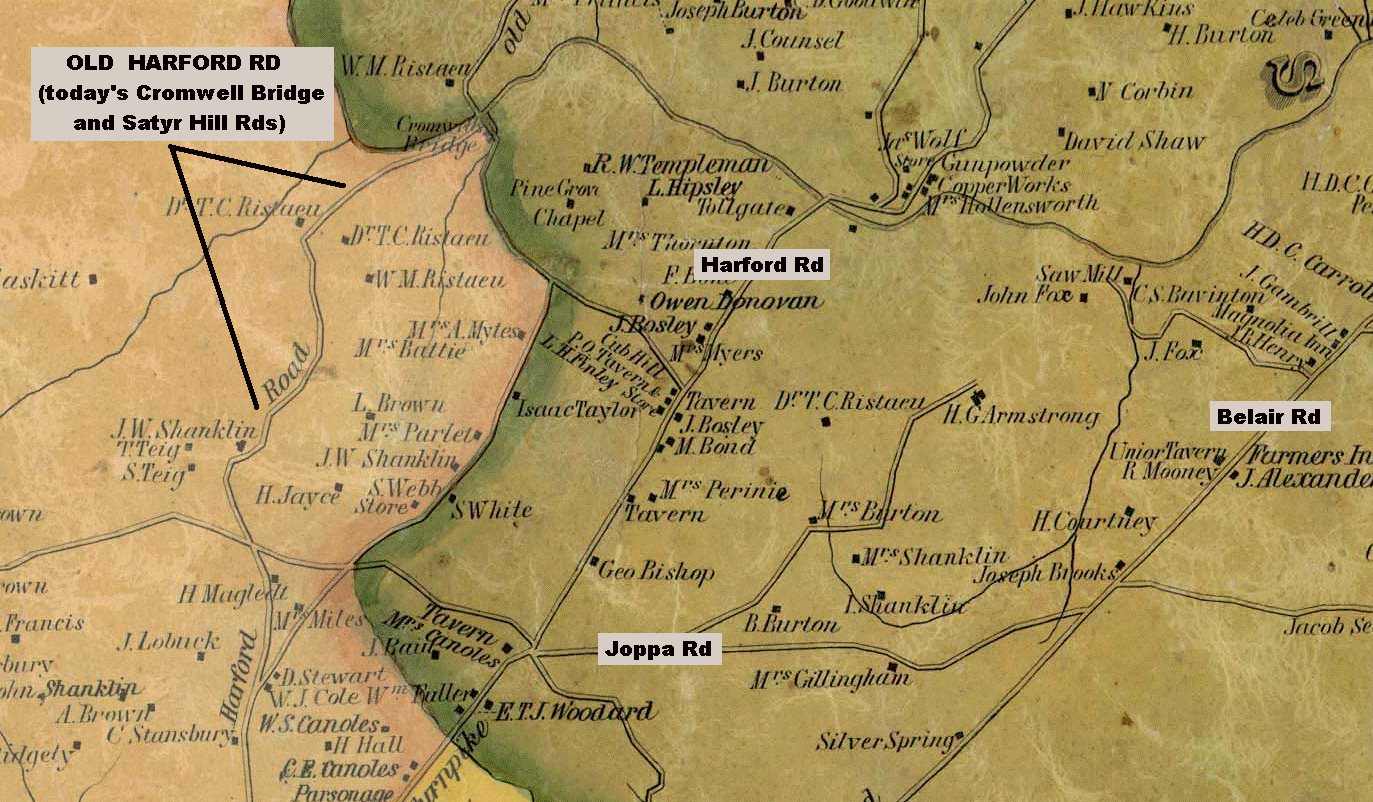
Close-up section of 1850 Sidney "Map of Baltimore County" (area immediately northeast of previous section), showing part of northeast Baltimore County to illustrate that today's Satyr Hill Road and that part of Cromwell Bridge Road north of Satyr Hill comprise part of the original Old Harford Road. Note that Cromwell Bridge Road did not yet exist southwest of its intersection with today's Satyr Hill Road.

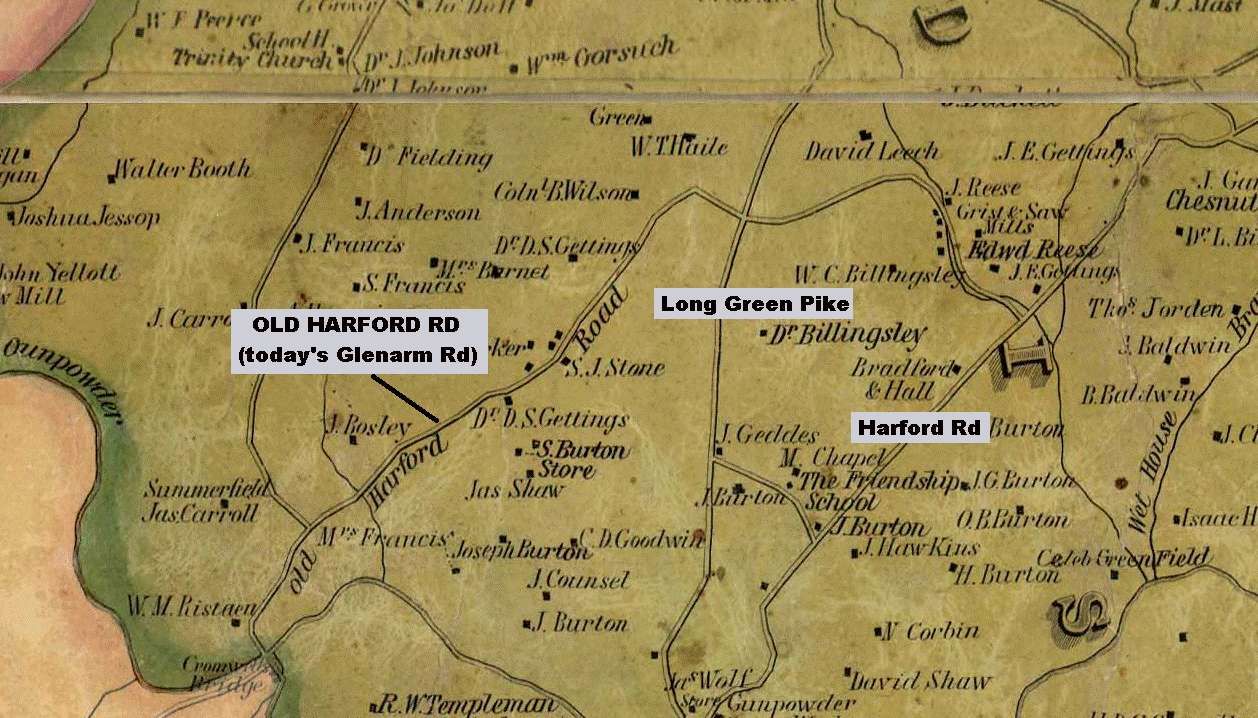
Close-up section of 1850 Sidney "Map of Baltimore County" (area immediately northeast of previous section), showing part of northeast Baltimore County to illustrate that present-day Glen Arm Road is part of the original Old Harford Road. The community of Glen Arm grew near the intersection of Old Harford Road with (today's) Long Green Pike.

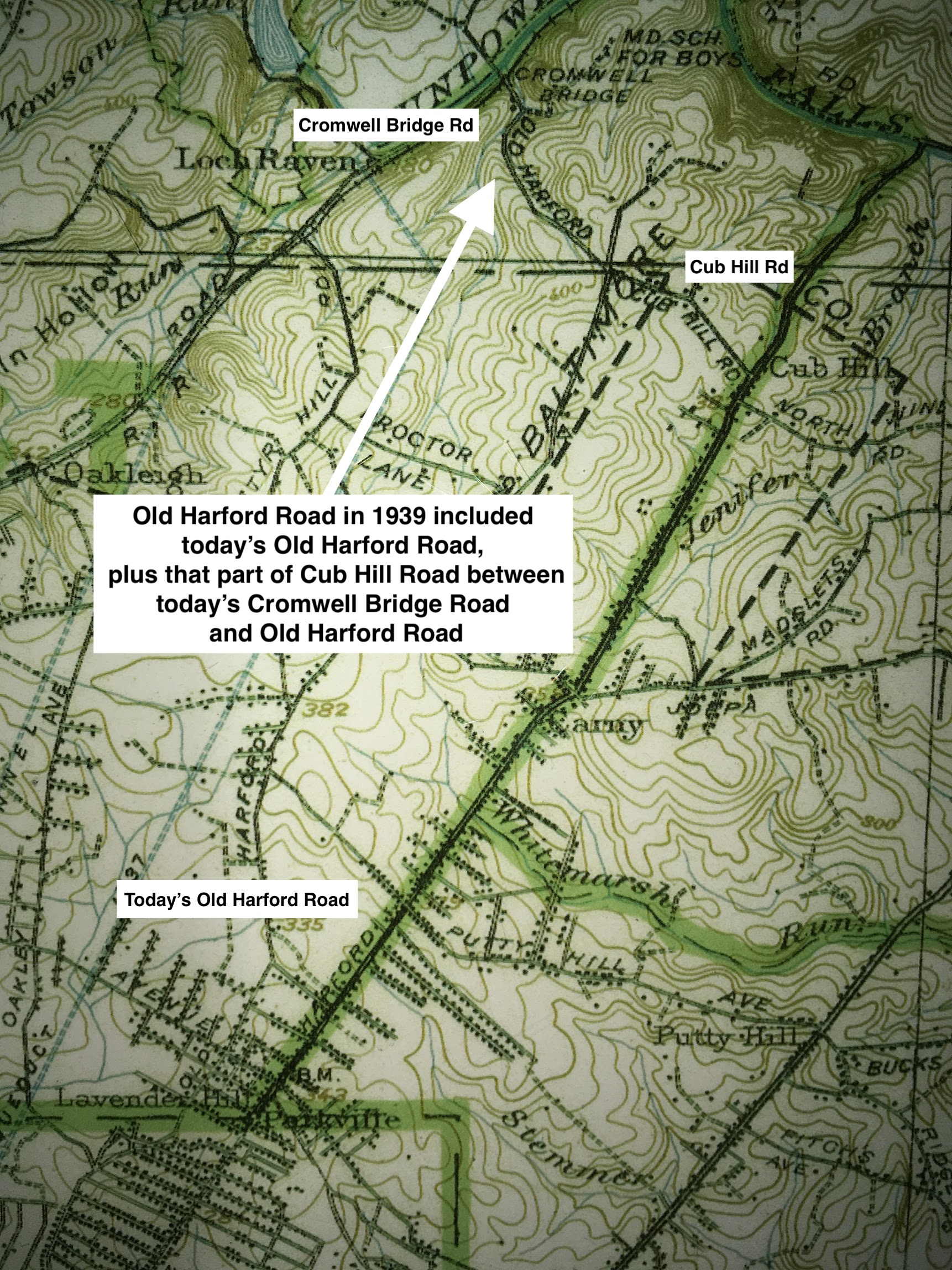
Detail of 1939 Maryland Geological Survey map of Baltimore County, Maryland, showing that the part of today's Cub Hill Road between today's Cromwell Bridge Road and Old Harford Road was, at that time, known as Old Harford Road

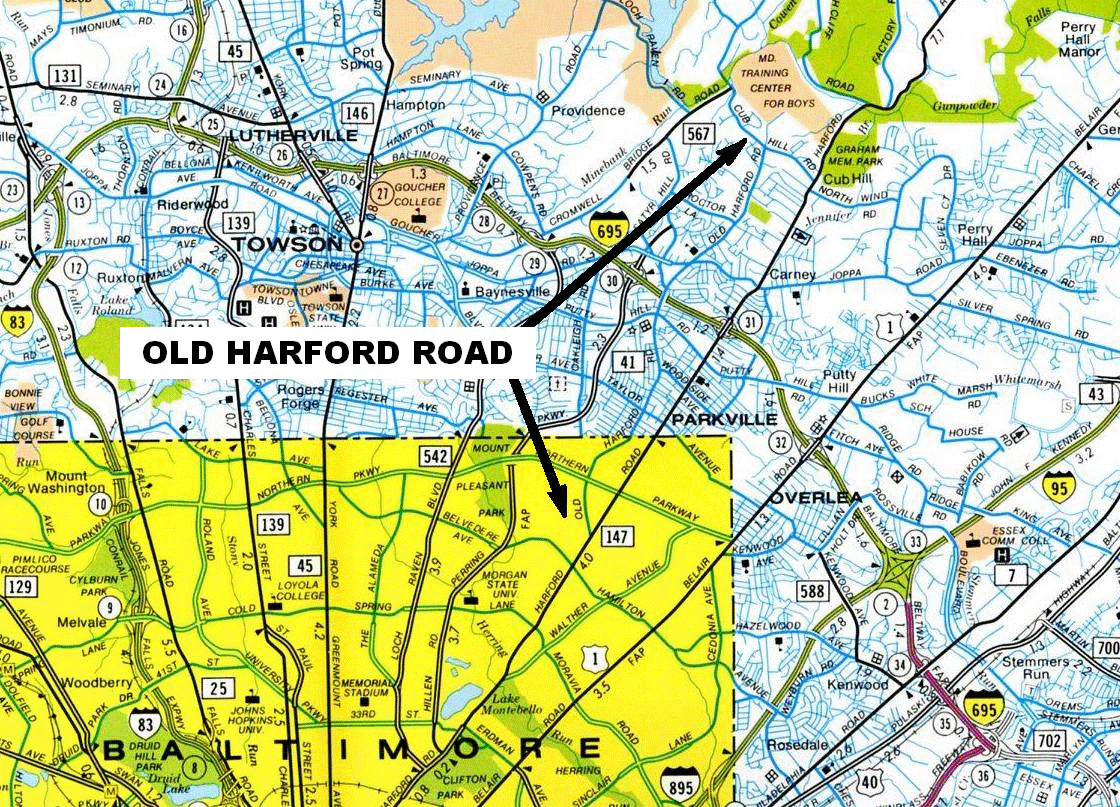
Recent highway map of northeast Baltimore City (yellow) and Baltimore County (white), showing present-day Old Harford Road. County-maintained highways, blue; state-maintained highways, black and yellow. (Sheet map, Baltimore County, Maryland State Highway Administration)

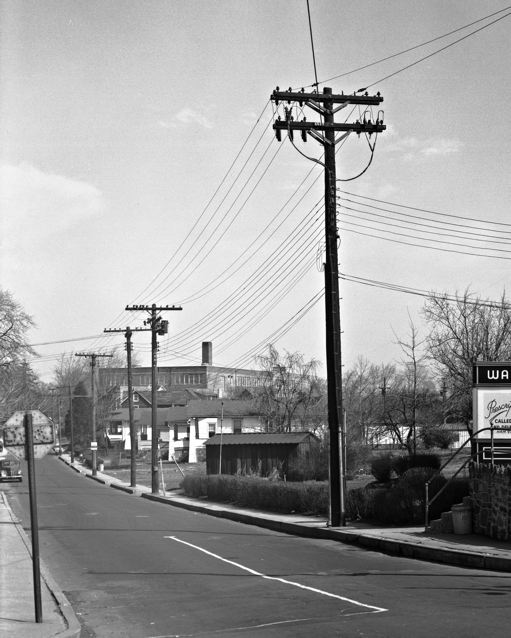
6000-block of Old Harford Road at Harford Road / Glenmore Ave, looking north, showing World War I - era bungalow construction and Hamilton Elementary School (1927) in middle distance; Apr. 1950

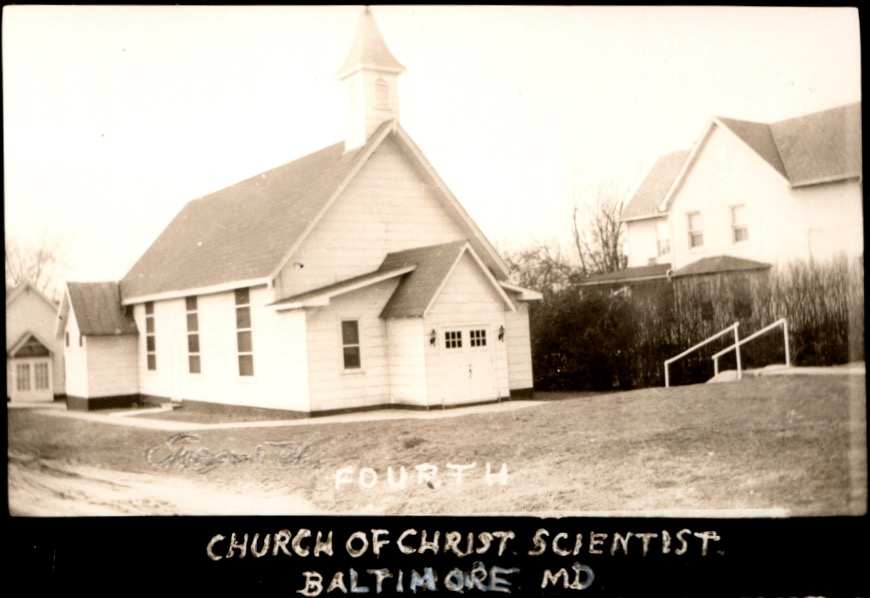
Fourth Church of Christ, Scientist, formerly St. Andrew's Chapel and Episcopal Church, 6010 Old Harford Road, looking northwest, c. 1925. The 1874 structure was razed in 1983 for construction of the larger Calvary Tabernacle worship facility now on the site.

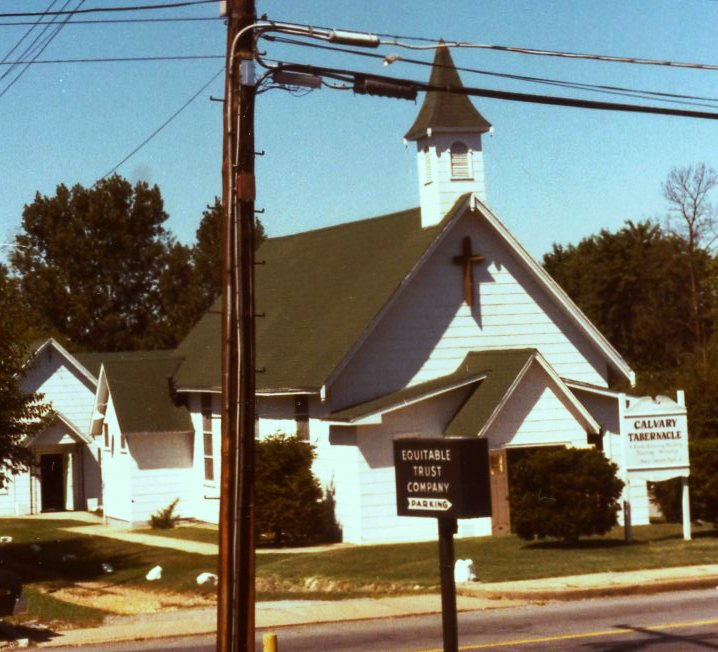
Calvary Tabernacle (formerly, Saint Andrew's Chapel and Episcopal Church and also the Fourth Church of Christ, Scientist, Baltimore), at 6010 Old Harford Road; looking northwest in 1982.

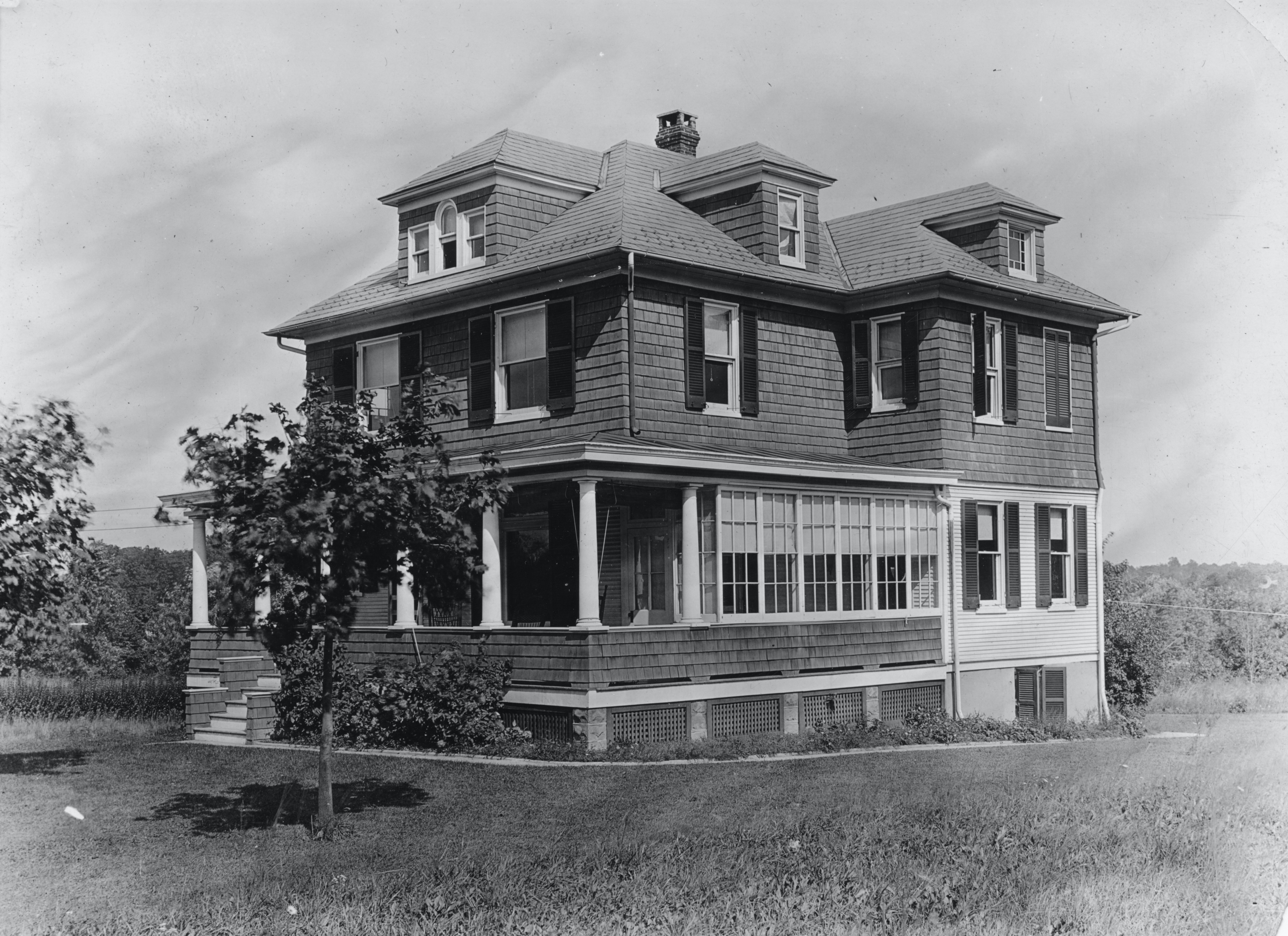
Typical home built during the "first wave" (c. 1910-1920) of suburban development along Old Harford Road in the Hamilton area of Baltimore; c. 1920 view looking northeast (courtesy of Matt Fleagle)

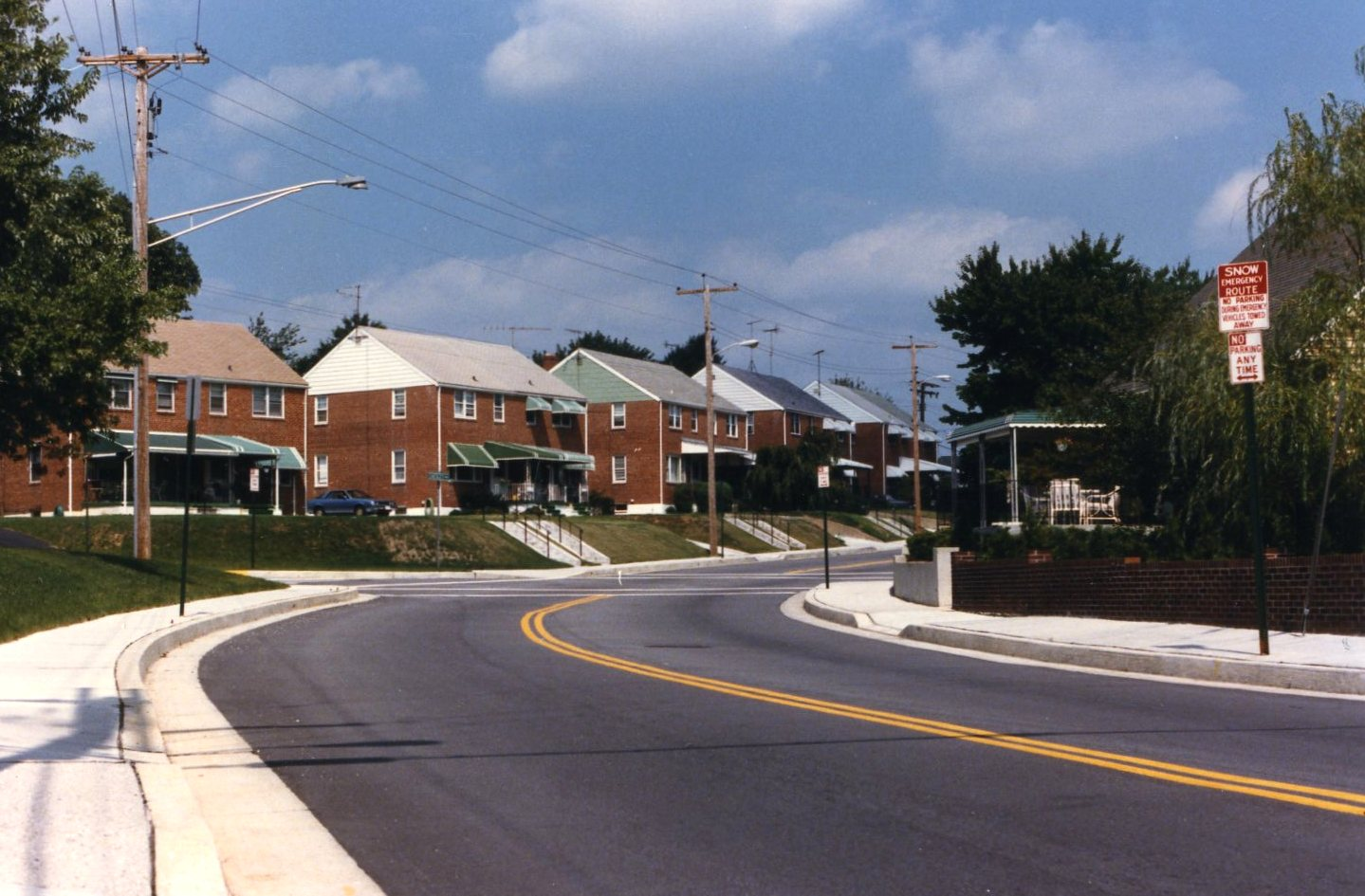
Old Harford Road at Chesley Avenue, Baltimore City, MD, looking north toward intersection with Moore Avenue in 1985, showing post-World War II semi-detached homes built c. 1953

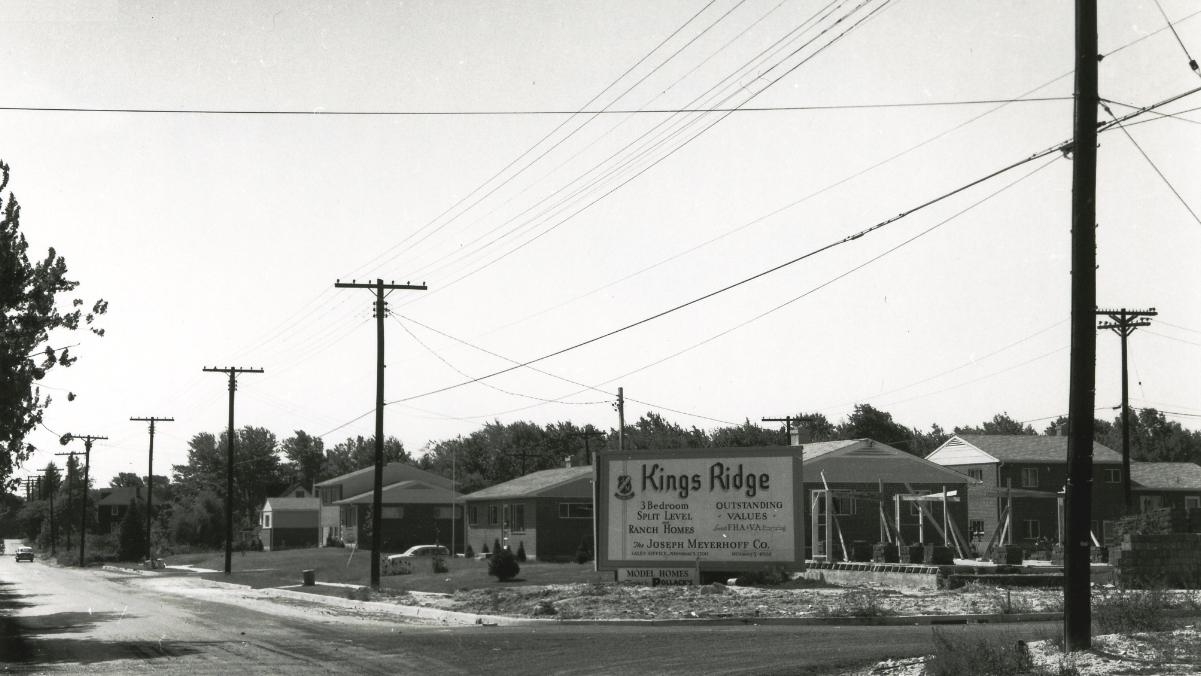
Old Harford Road at King's Ridge Road, Parkville, Baltimore County, MD, looking south, showing partial widening of Old Harford Road during construction of King's Ridge subdivision; Sep. 1956

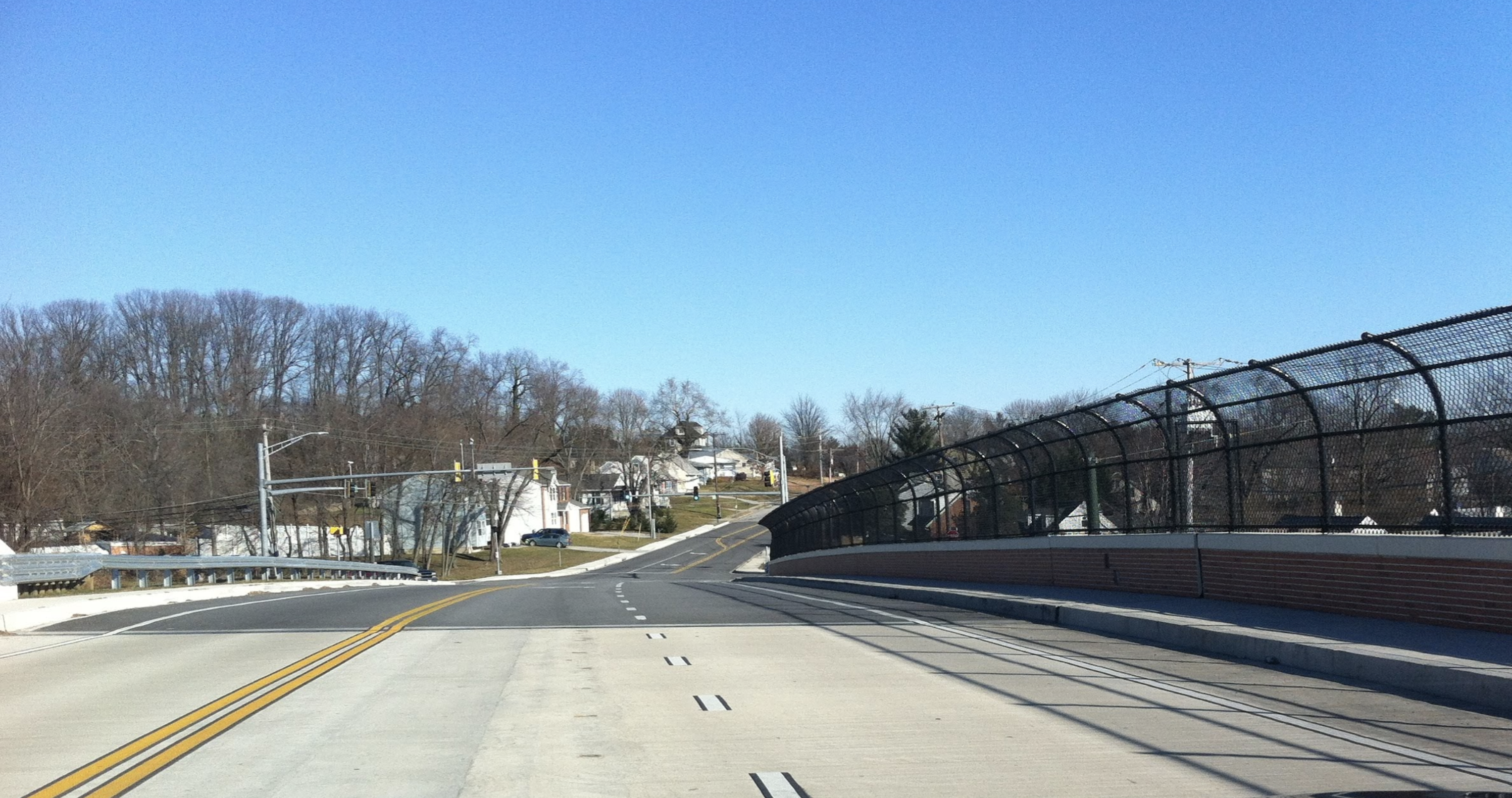
Old Harford Road at new (2017) I-695 Baltimore Beltway overpass, north end looking north

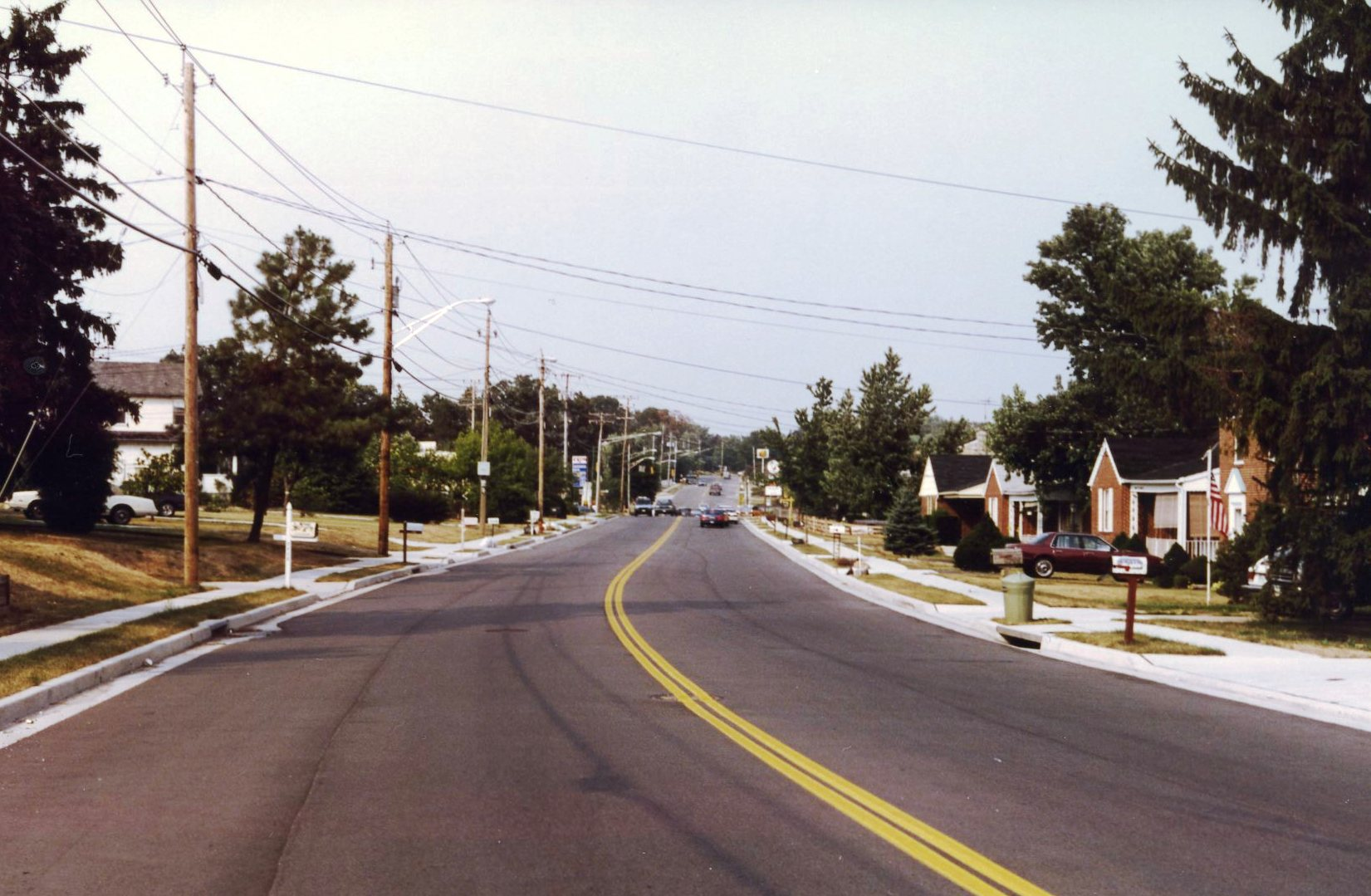
Old Harford Road near Lakewood Road, Carney, Baltimore County, MD, looking north toward intersection with Joppa Road in 1991, showing individual ranch-style homes built c. 1955

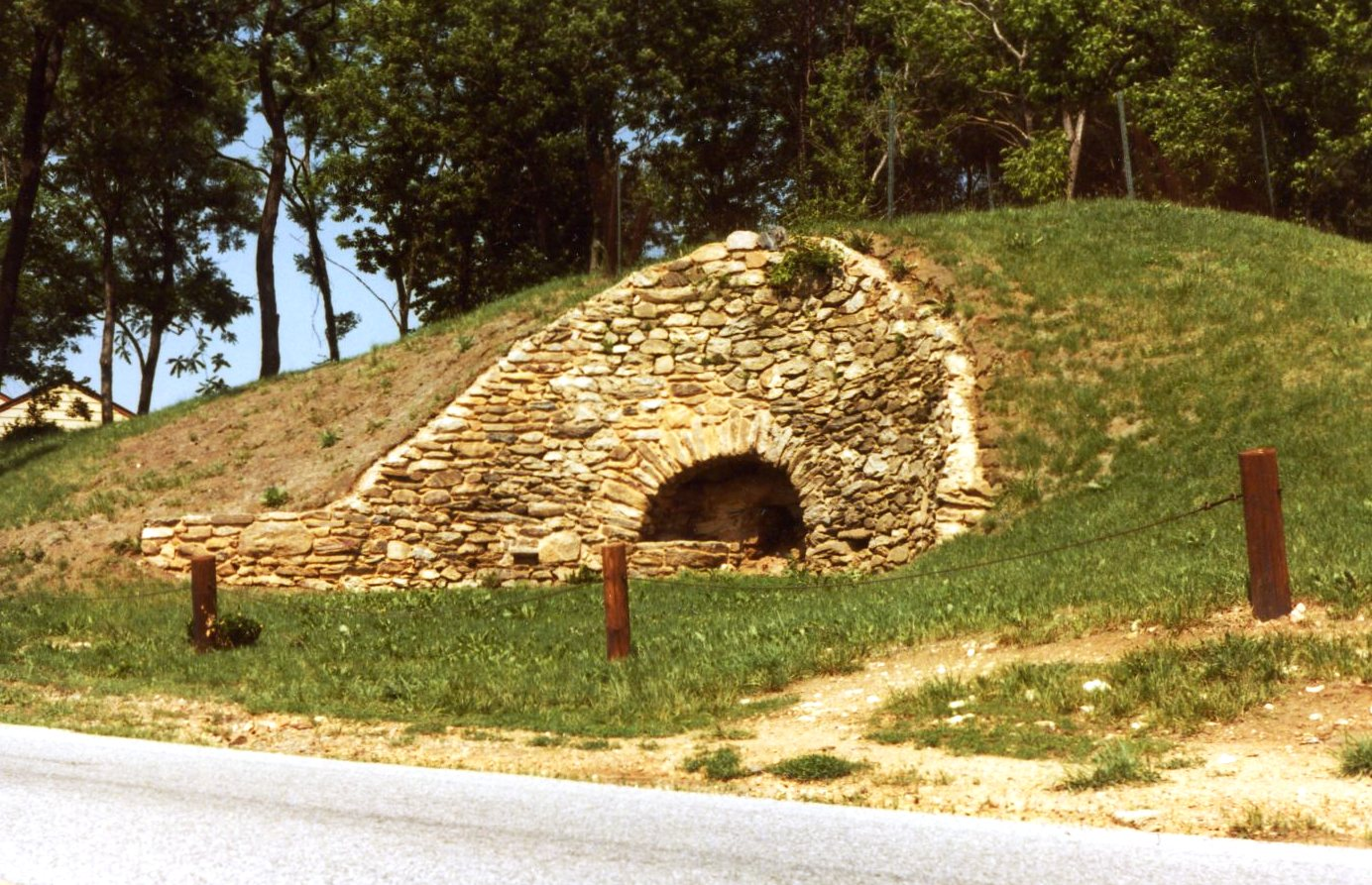
19th Century lime kiln, Old Harford Road near Summit Ave, Cub Hill, Baltimore County, MD

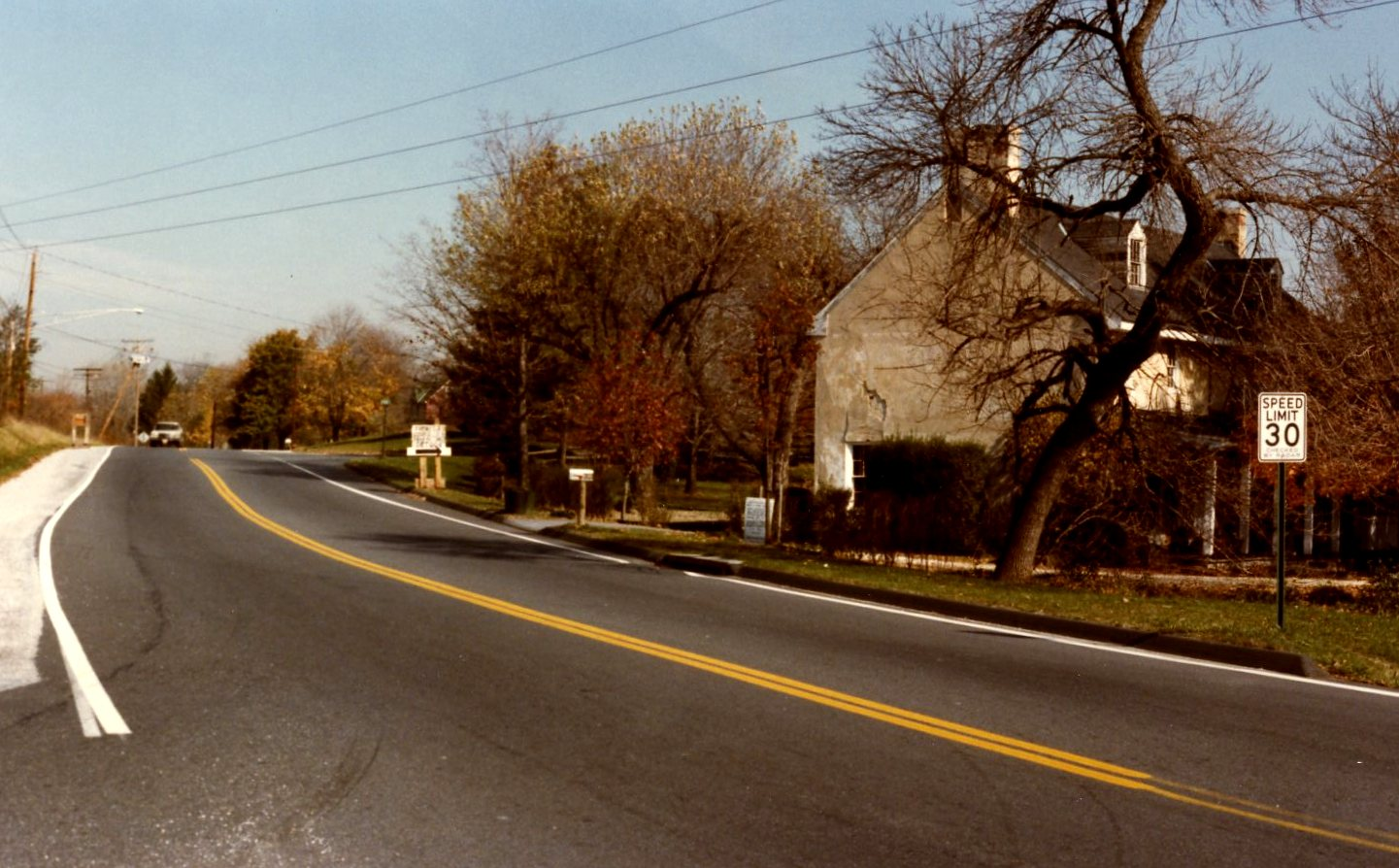
Cub Hill House, Old Harford Road near Summit Ave, Cub Hill, Baltimore County, MD

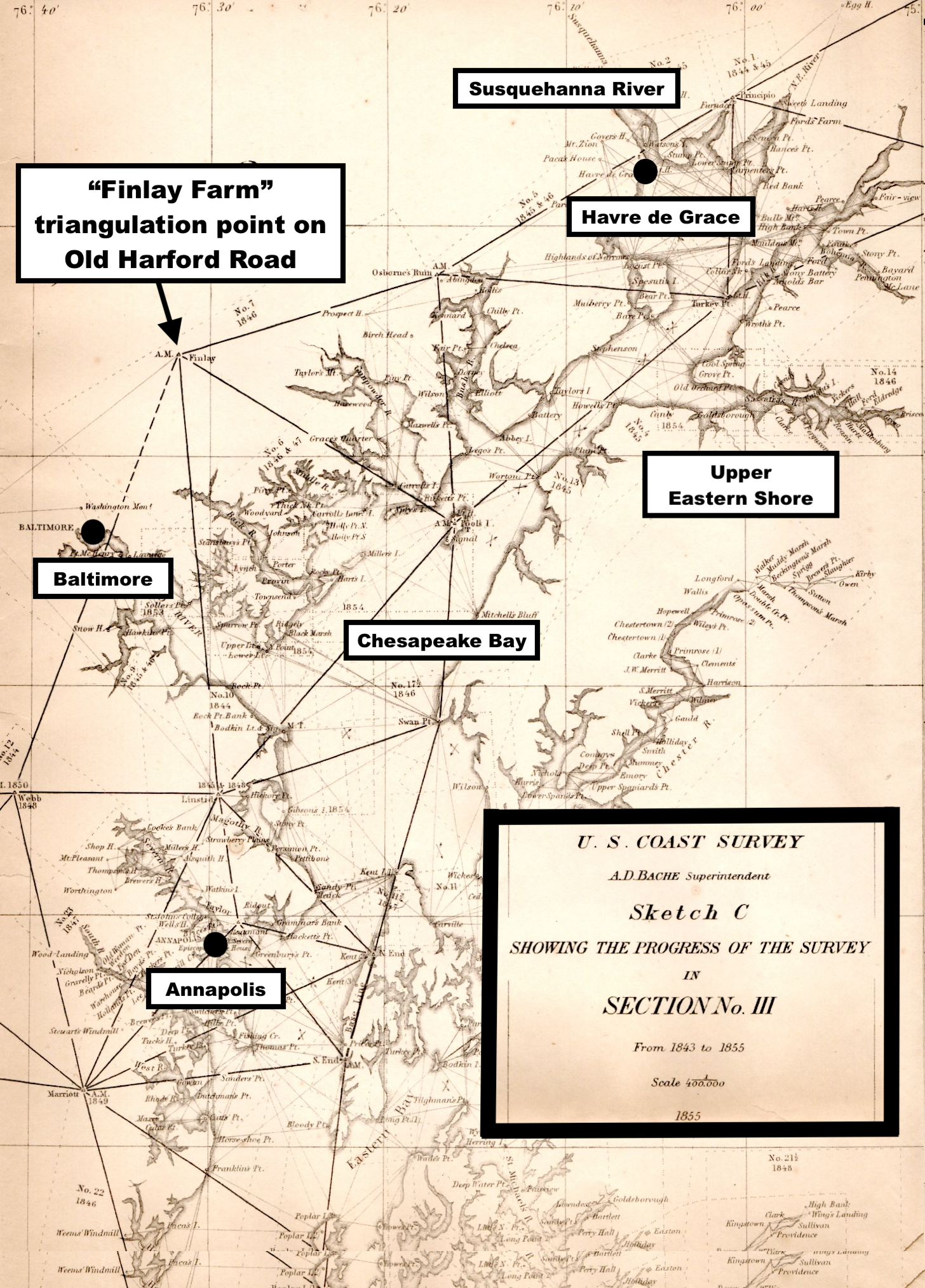
Annotated section of 1855 U.S. Coast Survey map of the upper Chesapeake Bay, Maryland, showing location of Finlay Farm ("Finlay") triangulation point on property of the Cub Hill House on Old Harford Road, Cub Hill, Maryland

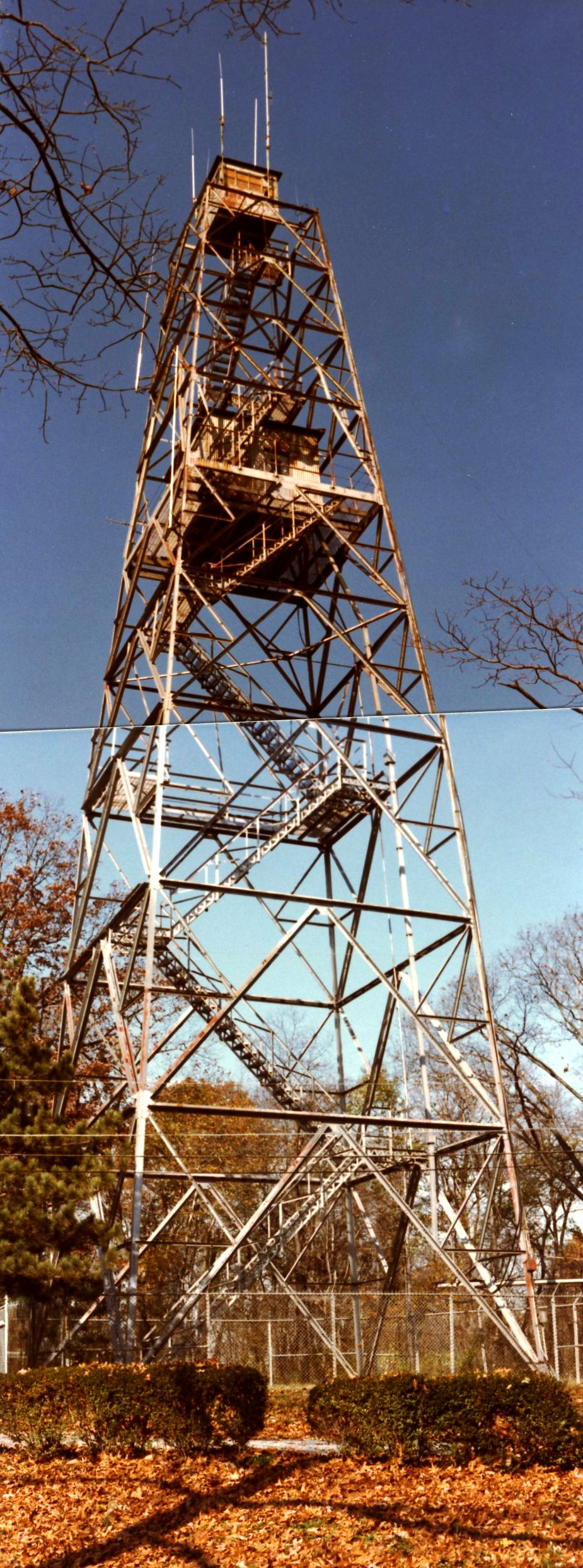
Former forest fire lookout tower and Western Union microwave network relay facility, Old Harford Road, Cub Hill, Baltimore County, MD, Nov. 1982

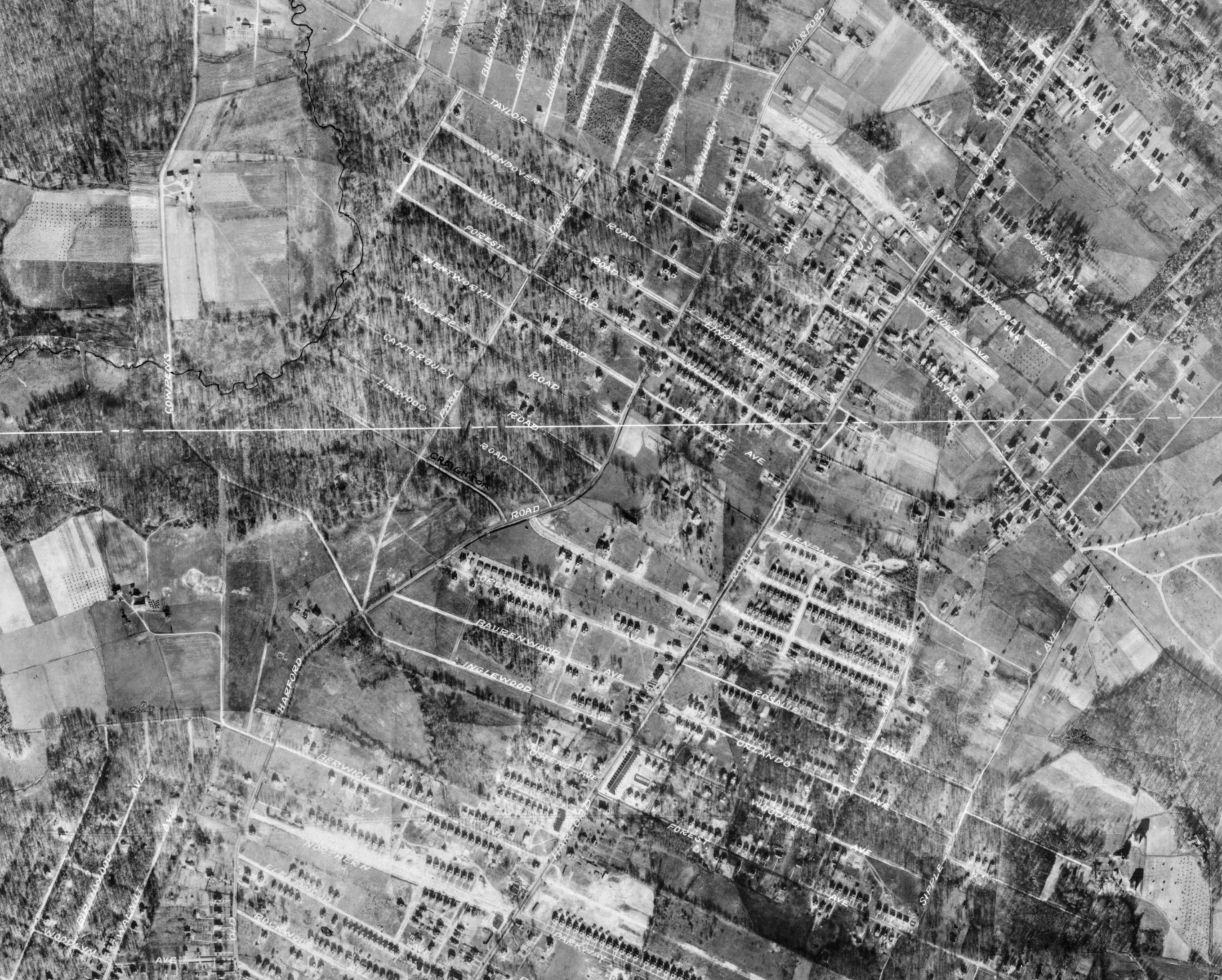
1927 aerial view of part of eastern Baltimore City and County, Maryland, showing the Old Harford Rd / Taylor Ave area; road names labeled in white (Image from the U. S. Agricultural Stabilization and Conservation Service, via the Maryland Geologic Survey and Johns Hopkins University - Sheridan Library)

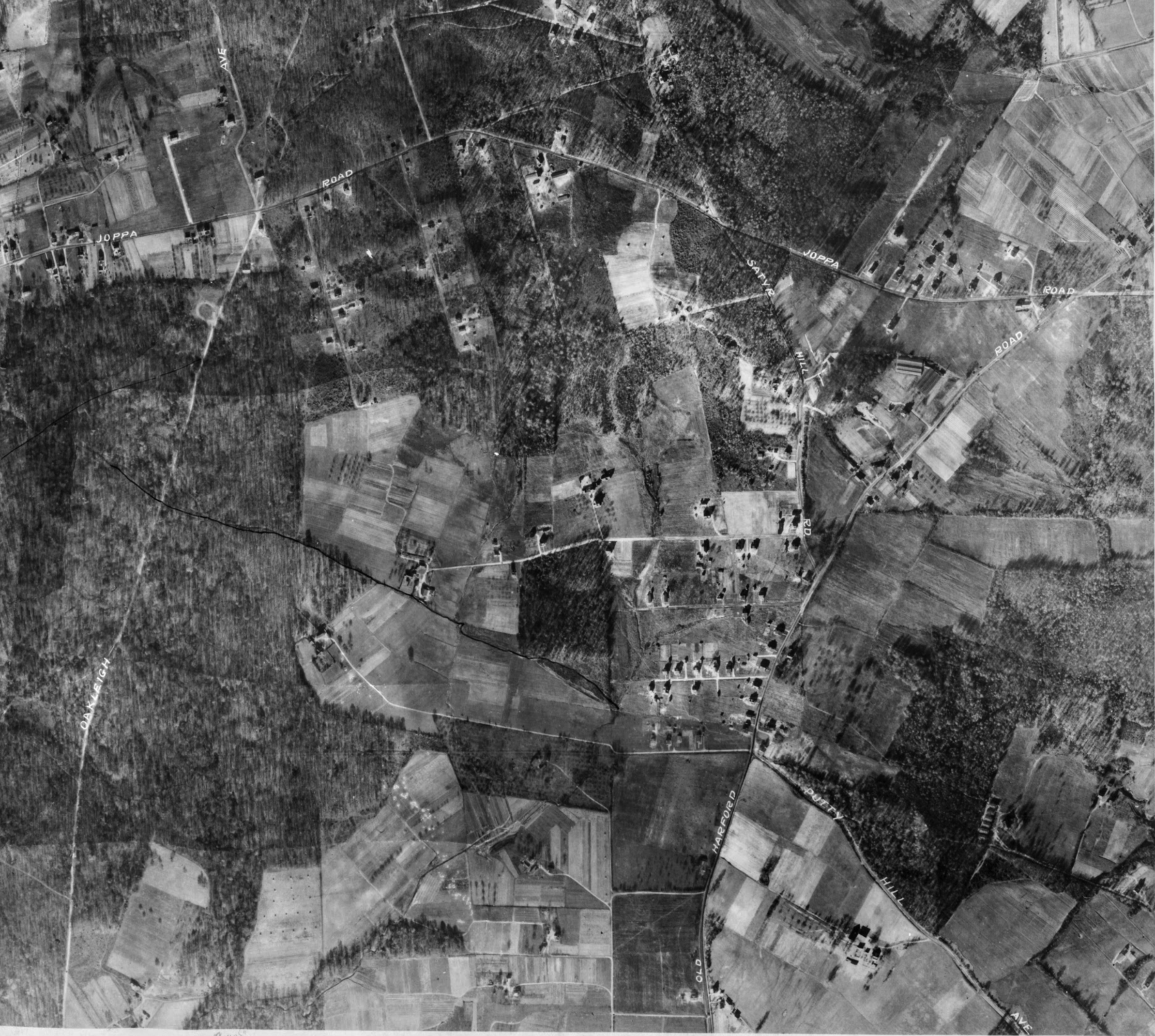
1927 aerial view of part of eastern Baltimore County, Maryland, showing the Old Harford / Joppa / Satyr Hill Rd area; road names labeled in white (Image from the U. S. Agricultural Stabilization and Conservation Service, via the Maryland Geologic Survey and Johns Hopkins University - Sheridan Library)

== In popular culture ==
- In the mid- to late 1970s, the route of the storied "Maryland Marathon" distance-run included Old Harford Road between Putty Hill Avenue to Satyr Hill Road. During those years the marathon course ran from Baltimore Memorial Stadium to Loch Raven Reservoir, and Old Harford Road was used to cross the Baltimore Beltway. In 1985, Old Harford Road between Harford Road and East Northern Parkway served as part of the route of the 16th annual Baltimore March of Dimes "Walk-A-Thon." The Walk-A-Thon raised money for the March of Dimes foundation, and a volunteer rest station was set up in front of Hamilton Elementary School at 6101 Old Harford Road.
- Laura Lippman, in her 1999 book, In Big Trouble, A Tess Monaghan Novel, mentions Old Harford Road on page 180, along with Old Frederick and Old York Roads, stating that while these routes "... weren't the fastest routes to their namesakes, they were always more interesting than the interstates ..."
- In An Imperfect Process (previous title: Twist of Fate), a 2003 book by historical and contemporary romance author Mary Jo Putney, protagonist lawyer Val Covington leaves the corporate world to establish private practice in a former church on Old Harford Road in Hamilton. Val falls in love with the building's landlord, and they together try to save the life of an innocent man on death row.
- In world-champion bicycle racer Marla Streb's 2006 book, Bicycling Magazine's Century Training Program: 100 Days to 100 Miles, Old Harford Road is mentioned several times regarding rides and observations made near her parents' home.

== Major intersections ==
Major intersections with commercial and/or institutional development along Old Harford Road include (listed south to north):

- Harford Road
- Northern Parkway
- Taylor Avenue
- Putty Hill Avenue
- Satyr Hill Road (just north of I-695 Baltimore Beltway overpass)
- Joppa Road
- Cub Hill Road

== See also ==
- Hamilton, Baltimore
- Parkville, Maryland
- Maryland Route 41
- Maryland Route 147
