= Maryland Route 41 =

State highway in Maryland, US

Maryland Route 41
- Maryland Route 41 highlighted in red

Route information
- Maintained by MDSHA and Baltimore DOT
- Length: 6.75 mi (10.86 km)
- Existed: 1962–present

Major junctions
- South end: MD 147 in Baltimore
- I-695 in Carney
- North end: Waltham Woods Road in Carney

Location
- Country: United States
- State: Maryland
- Counties: City of Baltimore, Baltimore

Highway system
- Maryland highway system; Interstate; US; State; Scenic Byways
← US 40	→ MD 42

Maryland Route 41 (MD 41) is a state highway in the U.S. state of Maryland. Known for most of its length as Perring Parkway, the state highway runs 6.75 miles (10.86 km) from MD 147 in Baltimore north to Waltham Woods Road in Carney. MD 41 is a four- to six-lane divided highway that connects portions of Northeast Baltimore, including Morgan State University, with Parkville and Interstate 695 (I-695). The state highway is maintained by the Maryland State Highway Administration in Baltimore County and the Baltimore City Department of Transportation in the city, where it is unsigned. MD 41 was built in the early to mid-1960s, largely to relieve congestion on portions of neighboring Old Harford and Harford Roads during the period of rapid post-World War II growth in the area.

== Route description ==
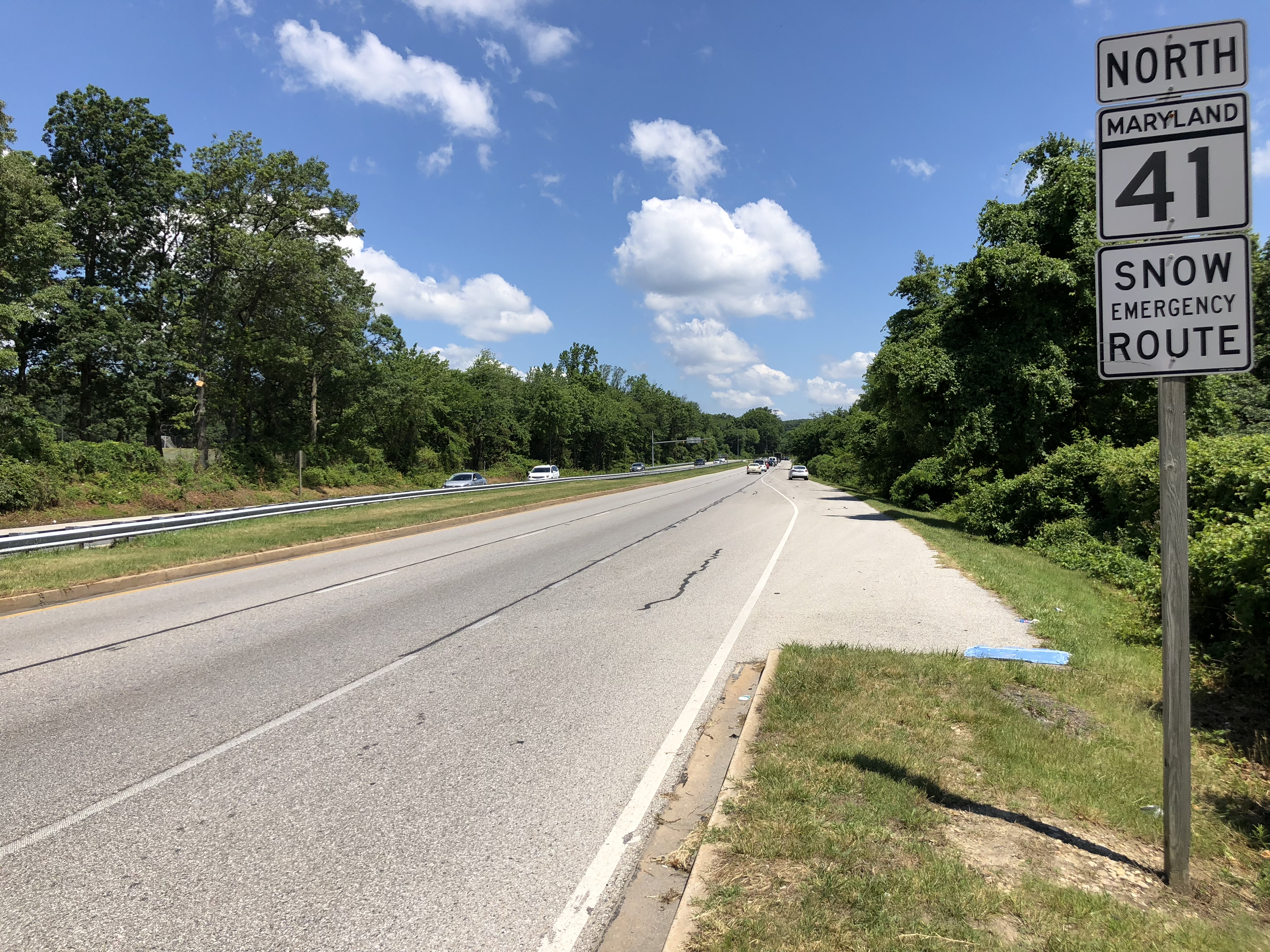
View north along MD 41 in Parkville

MD 41 begins at an intersection with MD 147 (Harford Road) adjacent to Clifton Park in Baltimore. The state highway heads north through the Coldstream-Homestead-Montebello neighborhood as Hillen Road, a four-lane undivided street that expands to a six-lane divided highway at 33rd Street. MD 41 passes between Lake Montebello and the Ednor Gardens-Lakeside neighborhood, heading east of Mergenthaler Vocational-Technical High School, and begins to follow the western edge of the Morgan State University campus. After intersecting Cold Spring Lane, the state highway crosses Chinquapin Run and its name changes to Perring Parkway when Hillen Road continues on that road's original northward route to MD 542 (Loch Raven Boulevard) in Hillendale. North of its intersection with Belvedere Avenue and Woodbourne Avenue, MD 41 becomes a controlled access highway that parallels Herring Run and follows the eastern side of Mount Pleasant Park.

MD 41 passes beneath Northern Parkway shortly before the state highway enters Baltimore County. The only direct ramp is from southbound MD 41 to westbound Northern Parkway; the remaining movements are made via a right-in/right-out interchange with Crozier Drive in the city or through McClean Boulevard just north of the city line in Baltimore County. MD 41 veers northeast through the suburb of Parkville, where the highway has intersections with Oakleigh Road and Wycliffe Road, and where the highway reduces to four lanes. North of junctions with Taylor Avenue and Putty Hill Avenue, the state highway meets I-695 (Baltimore Beltway) at a cloverleaf interchange and has an intersection with Joppa Road between four shopping centers. MD 41 becomes an undivided highway for its final section through Carney north to its terminus at Waltham Woods Road.

MD 41 is a part of the National Highway System as a principal arterial from MD 147 in Baltimore to Joppa Road in Carney.

== History ==
Perring Parkway was named for Henry G. Perring, the first president of the Maryland Association of Engineers and a Baltimore city engineer. The first section of Perring Parkway was completed from Joppa Road to the Baltimore Beltway in 1962 concurrent with the opening of the Beltway from MD 542 to U.S. Route 1. The highway was under construction from the Beltway south to Belvidere Avenue in Baltimore by 1963. Perring Parkway was completed from the Beltway to Taylor Avenue. MD 41 was signed on the Baltimore County section. The parkway already existed south from Belvedere Avenue to Hillen Road just north of Cold Spring Lane by the mid-1950s. The portion between Belvedere Avenue and Northern Parkway was completed in early 1966. MD 41 was extended north from Joppa Road to its present terminus around 1989, although the roadway itself was opened in the mid-1970s during construction of the adjacent North Plaza Mall.

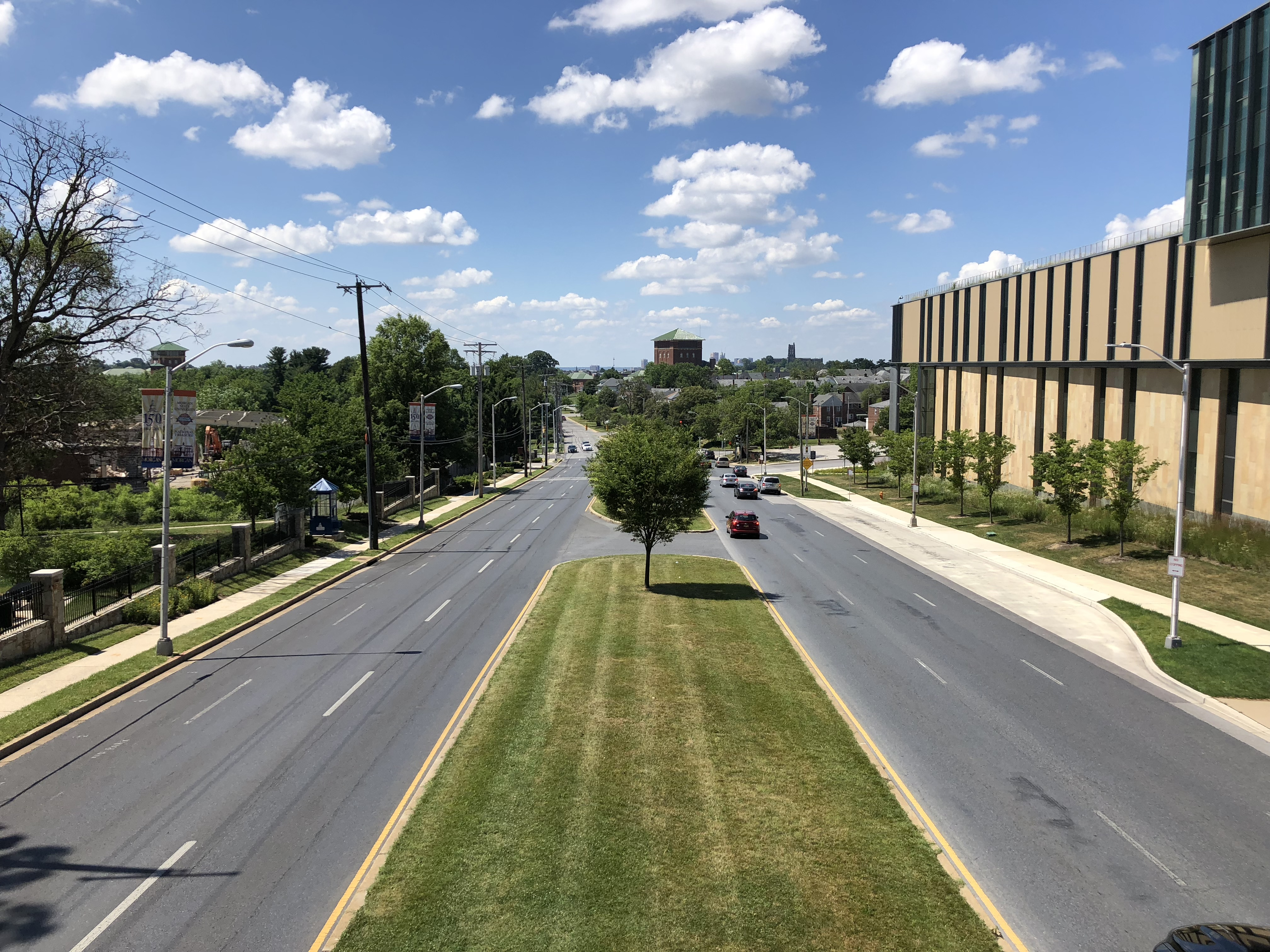
Southbound Hillen Road (unsigned MD 41) passing Morgan State University in Baltimore

== Junction list ==
County	Location	mi	km	Destinations	Notes
Baltimore City		0.00	0.00	MD 147 (Harford Road)	Southern terminus
Baltimore City		1.62	2.61	Cold Spring Lane	
Baltimore City		1.86	2.99	Hillen Road north	Roadway continues north as Perring Parkway
Baltimore City		3.48	5.60	Northern Parkway	Southbound exit only; no direct access from southbound MD-41 to Westbound Northern Parkway and northbound MD-41 to Northern Parkway
Baltimore	Carney	6.05	9.74	I-695 (Baltimore Beltway) – Essex, Towson	I-695 Exit 30
Baltimore	Carney	6.28	10.11	Joppa Road – Towson, Perry Hall	
Baltimore	Carney	6.75	10.86	Waltham Woods Road	Northern terminus
1.000 mi = 1.609 km; 1.000 km = 0.621 mi: Incomplete access

== See also ==
- Old Harford Road
