= Joppa Road =

County highway in Maryland, United States

- Joppa Road highlighted in red

Route information
- Maintained by Baltimore County
- Length: 14.3 mi (23.0 km)

Major junctions
- West end: MD 25 in Brooklandville
- MD 45 / MD 146 in Towson; MD 542 in Parkville; MD 41 in Carney; MD 147 in Carney; US 1 in Perry Hall
- East end: MD 7 near White Marsh

Location
- Country: United States
- State: Maryland
- Counties: Baltimore

Highway system
- County Roads in Baltimore County

Joppa Road (/ˈdʒɒpə/ JOP-ə) is a county highway in the U.S. state of Maryland. The highway extends 14.3 miles (23.0 km) from Maryland Route 25 (MD 25) in Brooklandville east to MD 7 near White Marsh. Joppa Road has three main segments separated by very short breaks on its course through central and eastern Baltimore County. The central segment is a multi-lane highway from MD 45 and MD 146 in the county seat of Towson to U.S. Route 1 (US 1) in Perry Hall. This highway is mostly a commercial strip and parallels Interstate 695 (I-695) through Towson, Parkville, and Carney. The western and eastern segments of Joppa Road are two-lane roads through mainly residential areas. The western segment connects Brooklandville and Towson via Riderwood. The eastern segment serves parts of Perry Hall and White Marsh.

Joppa Road and its western complement, Old Court Road, have been a cross-county highway since the 17th century. This highway connected the western part of the county to its original county seat of Joppa, which was sited on the Gunpowder River near the modern community of Joppatowne. Like Old Court Road, Joppa Road was improved on its state and county segments in the mid-1920s to form a circumferential paved highway around Baltimore. The state-maintained segment of the highway between Towson and Perry Hall was designated Maryland Route 148. MD 148 was widened in the mid-1930s and again in the late 1930s and 1940s. The highway's role as the primary east–west highway of Baltimore's northern suburbs was superseded by the construction of I-695 in the late 1950s and early 1960s. MD 148 was removed from the state highway system and all of Joppa Road became a county highway in the early 1960s.

== Route description ==
Joppa Road begins at a four-way intersection with MD 25 (Falls Road) and the northern end of the Jones Falls Expressway in Brooklandville. The intersection is a short distance north of the expressway's interchange with the Baltimore Beltway that forms one junction between I-83 and I-695. Joppa Road's western terminus is also a short distance south of MD 25's intersection with MD 130 (Greenspring Valley Road) and the Green Spring Station medical complex. Joppa Road heads southeast as a two-lane road that crosses over the Beltway just east of the aforementioned junction of I-83 and I-695. The highway veers east at its intersection with Old Court Road and passes through Riderwood. Joppa Road crosses over Roland Run and MTA Maryland's Baltimore Light RailLink and intersects Bellona Avenue, which leads to MD 139 (Charles Street) in both directions.

Joppa Road continues east along a ridge toward Towson. The two-lane highway crosses over MD 139 and meets the northern end of Charles Street Avenue. Joppa Road enters the downtown area of Towson at its intersection with MD 45 Bypass (Bosley Avenue). Two blocks to the east, Joppa Road becomes one-way westbound; to continue east, traffic must turn south onto Washington Street and east on Allegheny Avenue, an east–west street between Charles Street Avenue and downtown Towson. Allegheny Avenue and Joppa Road converge just west of the Towson Roundabout, a racetrack-shaped, five-legged roundabout at the junction of MD 45 (York Road), MD 146 (Dulaney Valley Road), Allegheny Avenue, and Joppa Road. Joppa Road heads east from the circle as a four-lane undivided highway on the south side of the Towson Town Center shopping mall and on a bridge directly above part of the retail building on the south side of the road.

Joppa Road leaves downtown Towson as a four-lane road with center turn lane. The highway has an oblique intersections with Providence Road and Goucher Boulevard and expands to a divided highway on the north side of the Towson Place shopping center. Joppa Road becomes undivided again as it approaches its intersection with MD 542 (Loch Raven Boulevard) on the northwestern edge of Parkville. The highway passes under I-695 (Baltimore Beltway) and expands to a divided highway again just west of its intersection with MD 41 (Perring Parkway), which has an interchange with the Beltway immediately to the south. Joppa Road becomes undivided again west of Old Harford Road and meets MD 147 (Harford Road) in Parkville.

Joppa Road continues as a four-lane road with center turn lane toward Perry Hall. There, the main segment of the highway ends at an intersection with US 1 (Belair Road); the east leg of the intersection is Ebenezer Road. Joppa Road continues when it splits off from US 1 one block north of Ebenezer Road. The two-lane road passes along the southern edge of Perry Hall and the northern edge of White Marsh. Joppa Road crosses Honeygo Run and has consecutive intersections with Honeygo Boulevard and Cowenton Avenue, meeting the latter at a roundabout. The highway continues southeast and crosses I-95 (John F. Kennedy Memorial Highway) before reaching its eastern terminus at MD 7 (Philadelphia Road). That state highway heads southwest through Rosedale to Baltimore and northeast toward Joppatowne, which lies near the site of the abandoned town of Joppa.

Joppa Road is a part of the National Highway System as a principal arterial from Goucher Boulevard in Towson east to US 1 in Perry Hall.

== History ==
Maryland Route 148
- Location: Towson–Perry Hall
- Existed: 1927–1963

Joppa Road originated as an Indian trail that was repurposed in the late 17th century as a patrol road and defensive perimeter across Baltimore County for rangers based at Fort Garrison to defend English settlements from hostile Indians. In conjunction with the Old Court Road, in the 18th century the path became the cross-county highway to Joppa, the original county seat of Baltimore County, which was located on the Gunpowder near what is now Joppatowne. Joppa Road west of Towson was never part of the state highway system, but Allegheny Avenue was constructed as a concrete road from York Road (later US 111) west to Charles Street Avenue (later MD 139) by Baltimore County with state aid by 1921. Allegheny Avenue later became MD 141 and was removed from the state highway system in 1961.

Joppa Road between US 1 and MD 147 was constructed by the state as a concrete road in 1925 and 1926. That road, which became MD 148, was the final link in the state and county construction of a hard-surface circumferential highway from Eastern Avenue (MD 150) to Liberty Road (MD 26). Between 1930 and 1933, Joppa Road was widened, resurfaced as a concrete road, and brought into the state highway system from MD 147 west to US 111. In 1934, the portion of MD 148 between MD 147 and US 1 was proposed to be widened from 15 to 20 feet (4.6 to 6.1 m). MD 148 was widened with a pair of 5-foot-wide (1.5 m) macadam shoulders from US 1 to MD 147 in 1938 and from there to MD 542 in 1940. The highway was widened to 24 feet (7.3 m) and resurfaced from MD 542 to Providence Road in 1948. Between 1950 and 1952, the block of MD 148 immediately to the east of US 111 was shifted, widened, and reconstructed as a bridge over the ground floor of the first suburban location of the Hutzler's department store.

Construction on the Baltimore Beltway, which functionally replaced Joppa Road as the main east–west highway between Towson and Carney, began from Joppa Road near Brooklandville to the Baltimore–Harrisburg Expressway (now I-83) in 1954. Joppa Road served as the western terminus of the northern arc of the Beltway from 1955 until the Jones Falls Expressway and the northwest portion of the Beltway from I-83 to US 40 in Catonsville both opened in 1963. Baltimore Beltway construction from MD 146 to MD 542 began in 1956; that section opened in 1958. MD 148's western end was moved to MD 542 in 1959. The remainder of the highway was transferred from the state to county maintenance in 1963, the same year the Beltway opened from MD 542 to US 1. Joppa Road was expanded to a divided highway from Goucher Boulevard to Drumwood Road and for 0.5 miles (0.80 km) on both sides of the MD 41 intersection in 1978.

== Junction list ==
The entire route is in Baltimore County.

| Location | mi | km | Destinations | Notes |
|---|---|---|---|---|
| Brooklandville | 0.0 | 0.0 | MD 25 (Falls Road) to I-83 (Jones Falls Expressway) / I-695 (Baltimore Beltway) – Baltimore, Butler | Western terminus |
| Riderwood | 1.1 | 1.8 | Old Court Road west – Pikesville | |
| Riderwood | 1.6 | 2.6 | Bellona Avenue to MD 139 (Charles Street) | |
| Towson | 3.0 | 4.8 | Charles Street Avenue south to MD 139 (Charles Street) | |
| Towson | 3.7 | 6.0 | MD 45 Byp. (Bosley Avenue) | |
| Towson | 3.8 | 6.1 | Washington Avenue north | Joppa Road becomes one way westbound; route east joins Washington Avenue |
| Towson | 3.9 | 6.3 | Allegheny Avenue west / Washington Avenue south | Route turns from Washington Avenue onto Allegheny Avenue |
| Towson | 4.1 | 6.6 | MD 45 (York Road) / MD 146 north (Dulaney Valley Road) / Joppa Road west – Baltimore, Timonium | Towson Roundabout; route rejoins Joppa Road |
| Towson | 4.9 | 7.9 | Goucher Boulevard | |
| Parkville | 6.2 | 10.0 | MD 542 (Loch Raven Boulevard) – Baltimore | |
| Parkville | 7.2 | 11.6 | MD 41 (Perring Parkway) to I-695 – Parkville | |
| Parkville | 7.7 | 12.4 | Old Harford Road | |
| Parkville | 8.5 | 13.7 | MD 147 (Harford Road) – Parkville, Bel Air | |
| Perry Hall | 10.9 | 17.5 | US 1 south (Belair Road) / Ebenezer Road east – Overlea, Chase | Eastern end of main segment of Joppa Road; route joins US 1 |
| Perry Hall | 11.0 | 17.7 | US 1 north (Belair Road) – Bel Air | Western end of eastern segment of Joppa Road; route leaves US 1 |
| White Marsh | 12.9 | 20.8 | Honeygo Boulevard | |
| White Marsh | 13.1 | 21.1 | Cowenton Avenue south / Scott Moore Way north – Perry Hall | Roundabout |
| | 14.3 | 23.0 | MD 7 (Philadelphia Road) – White Marsh, Joppatowne | Eastern terminus |
1.000 mi = 1.609 km; 1.000 km = 0.621 mi

== See also ==
- Track 11 of Ween's album "Chocolate and Cheese"
