= Maryland Route 147 =

State highway in Maryland, known as Harford Road

Maryland Route 147
- Harford Road
- Maryland Route 147 highlighted in red

Route information
- Maintained by MDSHA and Baltimore DOT
- Length: 18.82 mi (30.29 km)
- Existed: 1927–present
- Tourist routes: Horses and Hounds Scenic Byway

Major junctions
- South end: US 1 / US 40 Truck in Baltimore
- MD 542 in Baltimore; MD 41 in Baltimore; I-695 in Parkville; MD 152 in Benson
- North end: US 1 / US 1 Bus. in Benson

Location
- Country: United States
- State: Maryland
- Counties: City of Baltimore, Baltimore, Harford

Highway system
- Maryland highway system; Interstate; US; State; Scenic Byways
← MD 146	→ MD 150

Maryland Route 147 (MD 147) is a state highway in the U.S. state of Maryland. Known as Harford Road, the state highway runs 18.82 miles (30.29 km) from U.S. Route 1 (US 1) and US 40 Truck in Baltimore north to US 1 and US 1 Business in Benson. MD 147 is an alternate route to US 1 between Baltimore and Bel Air, the county seat of Harford County. The state highway is the main street of several neighborhoods in Northeast Baltimore and the Baltimore County suburbs of Parkville and Carney. MD 147 is maintained by the Maryland State Highway Administration in Baltimore and Harford counties and by the Baltimore City Department of Transportation within the city. Harford Road was a pair of turnpikes before the Baltimore–Carney portion of the highway was designated one of the original state roads. The Baltimore County section of MD 147 was constructed in the early 1910s and widened multiple times in the late 1920s and 1930s. The section of the state highway in Harford County was built in the late 1920s.

== Route description ==
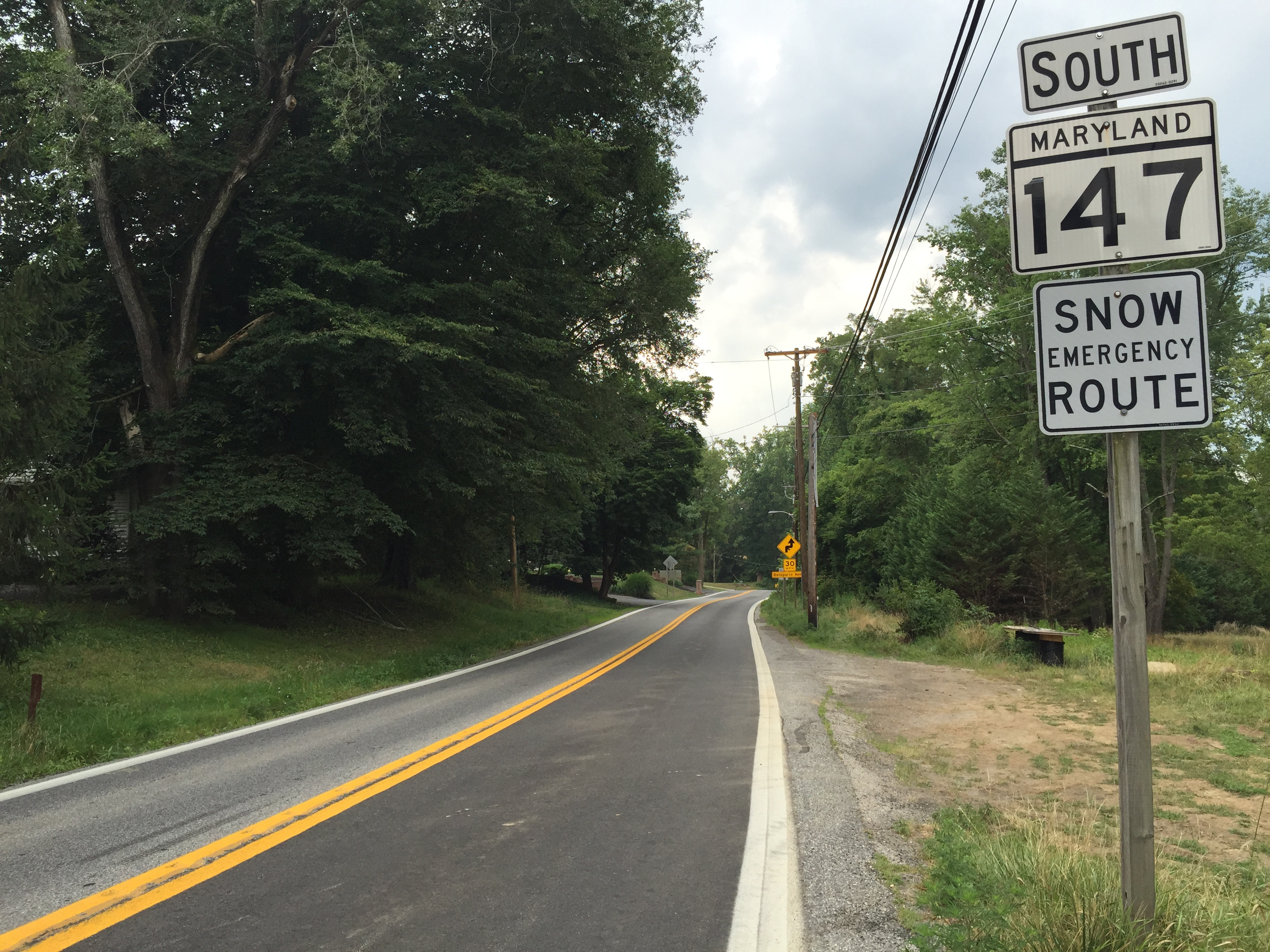
View south along MD 147 near Kingsville

MD 147 begins at an intersection with US 1 and US 40 Truck (North Avenue) in Baltimore. The south leg of the intersection is one-way northbound Harford Avenue; southbound Harford Avenue toward Downtown Baltimore is accessed via southbound Aisquith a few blocks to the west. MD 147 heads northeast from US 1 as a five-lane undivided road (three lanes northbound and two lanes southbound) that crosses over CSX's Baltimore Terminal Subdivision railroad line. Upon crossing 25th Street, the state highway widens to a six-lane divided street, passing west of Achievement Academy at Harbor City High School and along the western edge of Clifton Park. As it does so, it meets the southern ends of MD 542 (The Alameda) and MD 41 (Hillen Road). Within the Mayfield neighborhood, MD 147 narrows to four lanes undivided and passes by Lake Montebello and through Herring Run Park, where the highway crosses the namesake stream. Beyond Argonne/Parkside Drive, the state highway dualizes once again and gains a northbound parking lane, with one southbound lane doubling as a parking lane, as it then passes through Lauraville, where the highway intersects Cold Spring Lane and Moravia Road. Becoming undivided once again, MD 147 widens to accommodate two full-time parking lanes at Echodale Avenue before intersecting the southern end of Old Harford Road and then Northern Parkway in Hamilton. Upon entering Baltimore County, the parking lanes end, and MD 147 continues as the main street of Parkville, narrowing further to two traffic lanes and two bike lanes just north of Taylor Avenue. The state highway widens once again to four lanes just before Putty Hill Avenue and meets Interstate 695 (Baltimore Beltway) at a cloverleaf interchange.

Outside of the Beltway, MD 147 gains a center left-turn lane through its intersection with Joppa Road in Carney, north of which the road reduces to two lanes. North of Cub Hill Road in the community of Cub Hill, the state highway exits the suburban area and enters Gunpowder Falls State Park. MD 147 makes a curvaceous descent into the Gunpowder Falls valley and, after crossing a bridge and making a sharp curve to the southeast, parallels Gunpowder Falls for a short distance before turning northeast again and away from the stream. After a curvaceous ascent from the river valley, the roadway straightens out to pass through farmland with scattered subdivisions. MD 147 crosses Long Green Creek and has a sharp S-curve around a hill before intersecting Glen Arm Road/Mt. Vista Road at a roundabout. The state highway continues through the community of Fork, at the center of which the highway meets Fork Road and Sunshine Avenue. East of Fork, MD 147 descends into the valley of Little Gunpowder Falls, which forms the Baltimore–Harford county line. The state highway continues northeast and crosses Rocky Branch before its intersection with MD 152 (Fallston Road). MD 147 heads into the community of Benson, the site of its northern terminus at a four-way intersection with US 1 and US 1 Business. US 1 heads north as the Bel Air Bypass and south as Belair Road, while US 1 Business heads east on Belair Road into the town of Bel Air.

MD 147 is a part of the National Highway System as a principal arterial from US 1 in Baltimore to Joppa Road in Carney.

== History ==
MD 147's predecessor routes included parts of Old Harford Road in the late 18th century and a pair of turnpikes in the 19th century. The Baltimore and Harford Turnpike ran from Baltimore to the county line at Little Gunpowder Falls, and the Harford Turnpike went from there to the Baltimore and Bel Air Turnpike at the spot 2.5 miles (4.0 km) west of Bel Air that became the community of Benson. The portion of Harford Road from North Avenue in Baltimore to Cub Hill was designated one of the original state roads by the Maryland State Roads Commission in 1909. The proposed state road continued along what are today a series of county routes: Cub Hill Road, Glen Arm Road, and Manor Road to its intersection with Long Green Road in the community of Unionville or Long Green. Harford Road was under construction by 1911 from North Avenue to Taylor Avenue and completed in 1912. From North Avenue to the old city limits near Lake Montebello, Harford Road was reconstructed with a 50-foot (15 m) vitrified brick surface. From the city limits to Taylor Avenue, the highway was built with a 15-to-18-foot (4.6 to 5.5 m) wide tarred macadam surface.

The old turnpike along what is now Harford Road was resurfaced from Taylor Avenue northeast to Little Gunpowder Falls by 1915. The Harford County portion of Harford Road was reconstructed starting in 1926. The highway was completed as a macadam road from US 1 in Benson west to Rocky Branch in 1927. The remainder of Harford Road south to Little Gunpowder Falls was built as a concrete road in 1928. By 1930, the portion of Harford Road in Baltimore city and county was widened to a width of 20 feet (6.1 m). Harford Road was marked as MD 147 by 1933. Between 1936 and 1938, the tracks of a defunct interurban were removed and the space used to widen MD 147 to a width of 46 feet (14 m) from the Baltimore city line to Carney. That portion of MD 147 was widened again with the addition of a 7-foot (2.1 m) wide concrete shoulder around 1940. In 2018, a roundabout was constructed at Glen Arm Road/Mt. Vista Road.

== Junction list ==
County	Location	mi	km	Destinations	Notes
Baltimore City		0.00	0.00	US 1 / US 40 Truck (North Avenue)	Southern terminus
Baltimore City		0.80	1.29	MD 542 north (The Alameda)	Southern terminus of MD 542
Baltimore City		0.96	1.54	MD 41 north (Hillen Road)	Southern terminus of MD 41
Baltimore City		2.76	4.44	Cold Spring Lane west / Moravia Road south	
Baltimore City		3.96	6.37	Old Harford Road	
Baltimore City		4.44	7.15	Northern Parkway	
Baltimore	Parkville	6.53	10.51	I-695 (Baltimore Beltway) – Essex, Towson	I-695 Exit 31
Baltimore	Carney	7.12	11.46	Joppa Road	
Harford	Benson	17.73	28.53	MD 152 (Fallston Road) – Fallston, Joppatowne	
Harford	Benson	18.82	30.29	US 1 (Bel Air Bypass) / US 1 Bus. north (Belair Road) – Bel Air	Northern terminus; southern terminus of US 1 Bus.
1.000 mi = 1.609 km; 1.000 km = 0.621 mi

== See also ==
- Old Harford Road
