= Carney, Maryland =

- Census-designated place
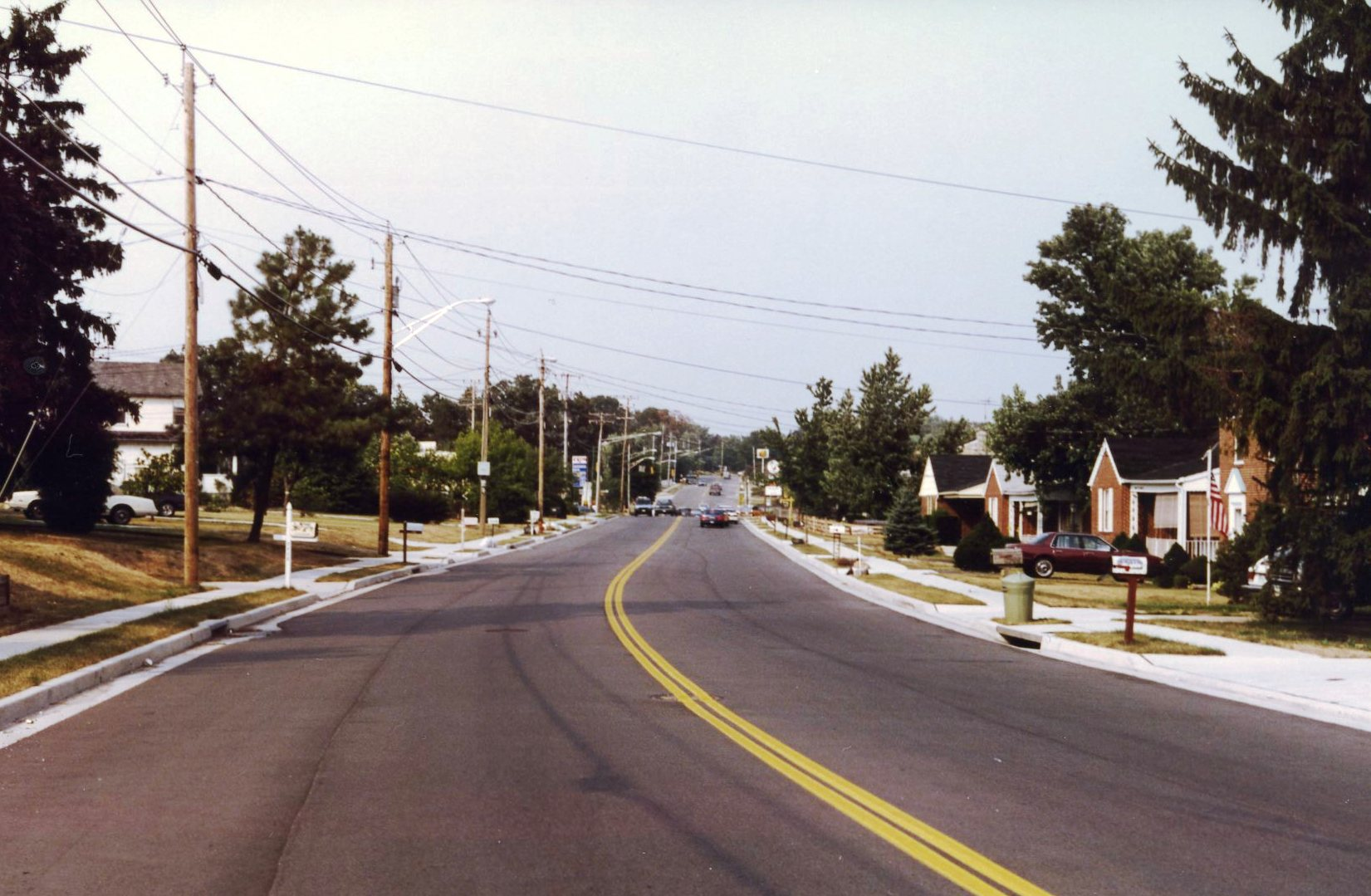
- Old Harford Road at Lakewood Drive in Carney, Maryland

- Location of Carney, Maryland
- Coordinates: 39°23′48″N 76°31′27″W
- Country: United States
- State: Maryland
- County: Baltimore

Area
  - Total: 7.01 sq mi (18.15 km^{2})
  - Land: 7.01 sq mi (18.15 km^{2})
  - Water: 0.0039 sq mi (0.01 km^{2})
- Elevation: 354 ft (108 m)

Population (2020)
  - Total: 29,363
  - Density: 4,191.2/sq mi (1,618.22/km^{2})
- Time zone: UTC−5 (Eastern (EST))
  - Summer (DST): UTC−4 (EDT)
- ZIP codes: 21234, 21236
- FIPS code: 24-13325
- GNIS feature ID: 0589899

Carney is an unincorporated community and census-designated place in Baltimore County, Maryland, United States. The population was 29,941 at the 2010 census.

== Geography ==
Carney is located at 39°23′48″N 76°31′27″W (39.396707, −76.524078).

According to the United States Census Bureau, the CDP has a total area of 7.0 square miles (18 km^{2}), all land.

== Demographics ==
Historical population
Census	Pop.	Note	%±
1950	1,523		—
1980	21,488		—
1990	25,578		19.0%
2000	28,264		10.5%
2010	29,941		5.9%
2020	29,363		−1.9%

=== Racial and ethnic composition ===
Carney CDP, Maryland – Racial and ethnic composition Note: the US Census treats Hispanic/Latino as an ethnic category. This table excludes Latinos from the racial categories and assigns them to a separate category. Hispanics/Latinos may be of any race.
Race / Ethnicity (NH = Non-Hispanic)	Pop 2000	Pop 2010	Pop 2020	% 2000	% 2010	% 2020
White alone (NH)	23,879	22,058	17,906	84.49%	73.67%	60.98%
Black or African American alone (NH)	1,914	4,198	6,486	6.77%	14.02%	22.09%
Native American or Alaska Native alone (NH)	43	65	41	0.15%	0.22%	0.14%
Asian alone (NH)	1,622	2,083	2,125	5.74%	6.96%	7.24%
Native Hawaiian or Pacific Islander alone (NH)	12	7	14	0.04%	0.02%	0.05%
Other race alone (NH)	32	55	123	0.11%	0.18%	0.42%
Mixed race or Multiracial (NH)	334	520	1,226	1.18%	1.74%	4.18%
Hispanic or Latino (any race)	428	955	1,442	1.51%	3.19%	4.91%
Total	28,264	29,941	29,363	100.00%	100.00%	100.00%

=== 2020 census ===
As of the 2020 census, Carney had a population of 29,363. The median age was 40.3 years. 21.0% of residents were under the age of 18 and 22.2% of residents were 65 years of age or older. For every 100 females there were 85.4 males, and for every 100 females age 18 and over there were 80.4 males age 18 and over.

99.8% of residents lived in urban areas, while 0.2% lived in rural areas.

There were 12,301 households in Carney, of which 28.1% had children under the age of 18 living in them. Of all households, 40.1% were married-couple households, 17.7% were households with a male householder and no spouse or partner present, and 35.4% were households with a female householder and no spouse or partner present. About 33.3% of all households were made up of individuals and 17.8% had someone living alone who was 65 years of age or older.

There were 13,007 housing units, of which 5.4% were vacant. The homeowner vacancy rate was 1.8% and the rental vacancy rate was 6.8%.

Racial composition as of the 2020 census
Race	Number	Percent
White	18,189	61.9%
Black or African American	6,579	22.4%
American Indian and Alaska Native	70	0.2%
Asian	2,142	7.3%
Native Hawaiian and Other Pacific Islander	14	0.0%
Some other race	587	2.0%
Two or more races	1,782	6.1%
Hispanic or Latino (of any race)	1,442	4.9%

=== 2000 census ===
As of the census of 2000, there were 28,264 people, 12,083 households, and 7,322 families living in the CDP. The population density was 4,042.7 people per square mile (1,561.2 per km^{2}). There were 12,477 housing units at an average density of 1,784.6 per square mile (689.2 per km^{2}). The racial makeup of the CDP was 85.31% White, 6.92% African American, 0.17% Native American, 5.74% Asian, 0.06% Pacific Islander, 0.43% from other races, and 1.37% from two or more races. Hispanic or Latino of any race were 1.51% of the population.

There were 12,083 households, out of which 27.1% had children under the age of 18 living with them, 46.2% were married couples living together, 10.6% had a female householder with no husband present, and 39.4% were non-families. 32.4% of all households were made up of individuals, and 15.0% had someone living alone who was 65 years of age or older. The average household size was 2.28 and the average family size was 2.91.

In the CDP, the population was spread out, with 22.0% under the age of 18, 8.2% from 18 to 24, 29.4% from 25 to 44, 21.0% from 45 to 64, and 19.4% who were 65 years of age or older. The median age was 39 years. For every 100 females, there were 89.5 males. For every 100 females age 18 and over, there were 84.3 males.

The median income for a household in the CDP was $49,365, and the median income for a family was $57,079. Males had a median income of $40,265 versus $31,914 for females. The per capita income for the CDP was $24,428. About 2.8% of families and 5.4% of the population were below the poverty line, including 5.2% of those under age 18 and 7.5% of those age 65 or over.

== History ==
In 1880, Thomas Carney immigrated to the United States from Ireland and settled in Texas, Maryland. Soon after his arrival, he married the former Mary McDermot and bought forty and one-half acres on the southeast side of the Baltimore and Harford Turnpike.

Several years later (circa 1885), the Carney family moved to what is now Harford and Joppa roads, where Thomas Carney opened a general store which is believed to have served as the Eight Mile House on the turnpike. The store was located on the site presently occupied by the Das Bierhalle Restaurant. In the 1880s and 1890s, the store also served as the Carney family home.

When the family grew too large for the store, Mr. Carney built a new house on the hill behind the store. The house was completed in approximately 1898 and stood in the vicinity of what is now Thornewood Court. Thirty-five years later, the Carney house was moved to its present location at the corner of Joppa and Avondale roads and is now a real estate office.

With the passage of time and the suburban growth of Baltimore County, the land once owned by the Carney family has been sold to individuals and developers. However, the Carney family name is now carried by area businesses and clubs. Two institutions, the Carney Library and the Carney Elementary School, also carry the name. Little did Thomas Carney, an industrious Irish immigrant, realize that his memory would live on by a community which bears his name.

The Great Carney Fire of 1911 was started by two boys playing with matches in a weed patch behind Carney's Hotel (now Das Bierhalle) on Harford Road. When it was finally extinguished 700 acres had burned. The burned over area was located between Harford, Joppa, Belair, and Putty Hill Roads. Fire Companies from Gardenville, Parkville, Hamilton, Towson, and Roland Park responded. The Carney and Snyder homes narrowly survived and are still standing today. Given that this conflagration occurred in 1911, it's safe to assume at least some of the firefighters were veterans of the Great Baltimore Fire of 1904. Thankfully, no one was killed, and the only injury reported was a firefighter who sustained a sprained ankle.

== Education ==
Carney is served by Carney Elementary School, Harford Hills Elementary School, Seven Oaks Elementary School, Pine Grove Elementary School, Perry Hall Elementary School, Rossville Elementary School, Pine Grove Middle School, Perry Hall Middle School, Loch Raven High School, Parkville High School, and Perry Hall High School.

== Transportation ==
=== Roads ===
Some of the major roads in the Carney area are:

- Joppa Road
- Harford Road (MD-147)
- Old Harford Road

=== Public transportation ===
The Maryland Transit Administration's Bus Route 54 operates along Harford Road between the Carney Park-and-Ride and Downtown Baltimore.

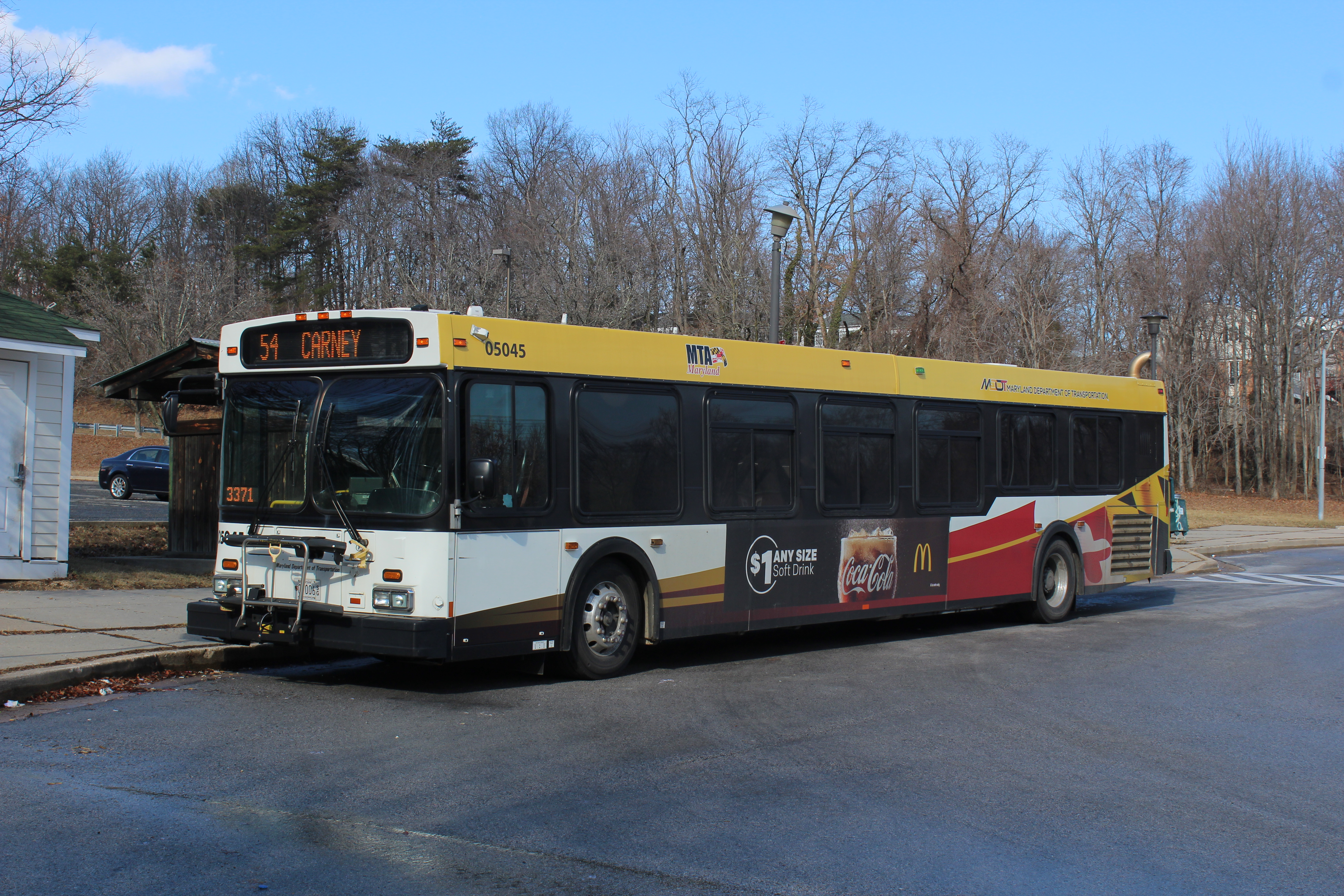
BLink05045
