= Maryland Route 43 =

State highway in Baltimore County, Maryland, known as White Marsh Blvd

Maryland Route 43
- White Marsh Boulevard; Korean War and Korea Service Veterans Memorial Highway
- Maryland Route 43 highlighted in red

Route information
- Maintained by MDSHA
- Length: 8.65 mi (13.92 km)
- Existed: 1963–present

Major junctions
- West end: I-695 near Parkville
- US 1 in Fullerton; I-95 in White Marsh; MD 7 near White Marsh; US 40 near White Marsh
- East end: MD 150 in Middle River

Location
- Country: United States
- State: Maryland
- Counties: Baltimore

Highway system
- Maryland highway system; Interstate; US; State; Scenic Byways
← MD 42	→ MD 45

Maryland Route 43 (MD 43) is a state highway in the U.S. state of Maryland. Known as White Marsh Boulevard, the state highway runs 8.65 miles (13.92 km) from Interstate 695 (I-695) near Parkville east to MD 150 in Middle River. MD 43 is a four-lane divided highway in eastern Baltimore County that connects the northern and eastern suburbs of Baltimore with the commercial center of White Marsh, where the highway has junctions with I-95 and U.S. Route 40 (US 40). The state highway was built from west of I-95 to US 40 concurrent with the construction of I-95 in the early 1960s. MD 43 was extended west to Parkville in the early 1990s and east to Middle River in 2006.

== Route description ==
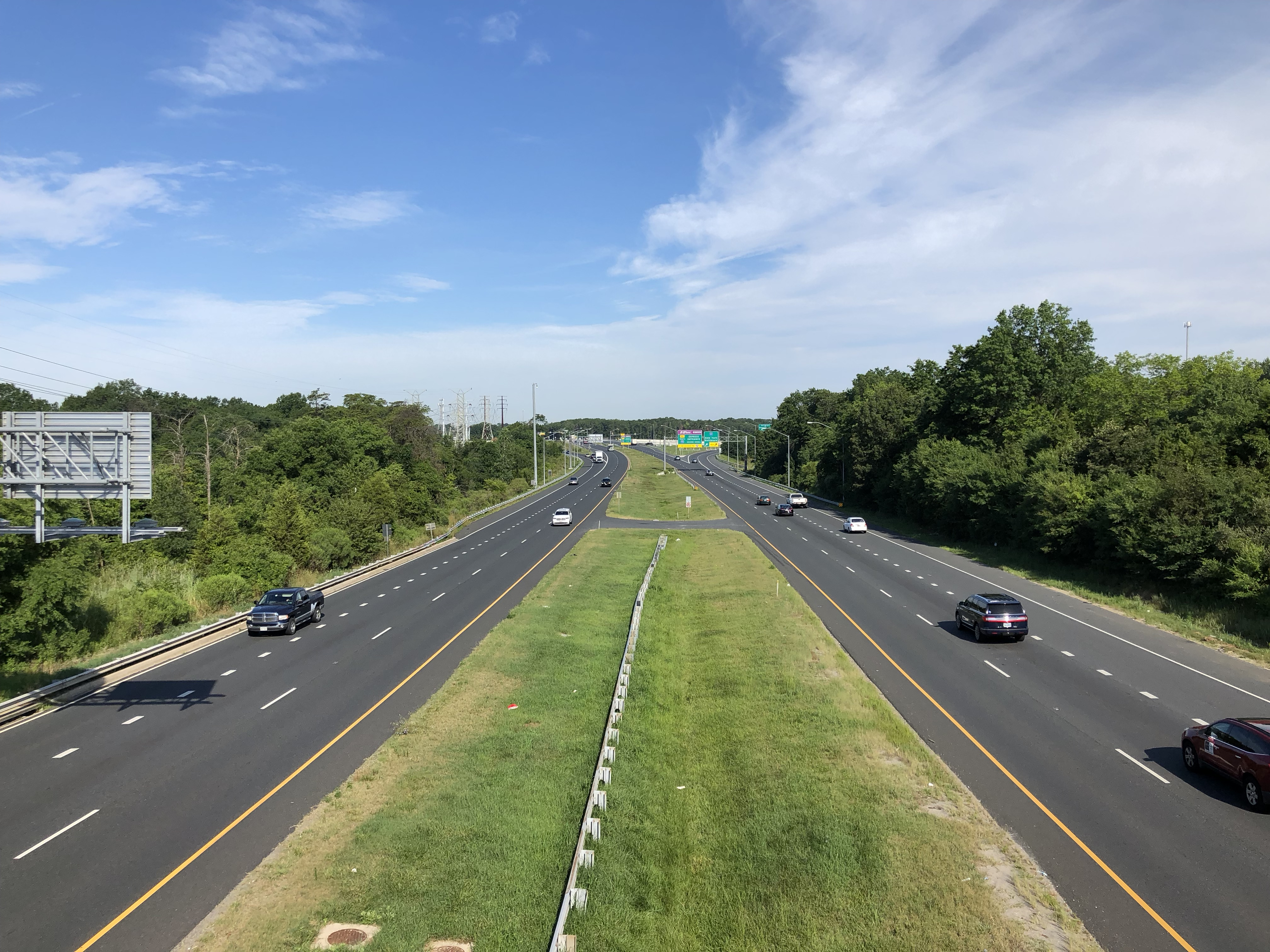
View west along MD 43 from MD 7 in White Marsh

MD 43 begins at a partial interchange with I-695 (Baltimore Beltway) near Parkville that includes ramps from eastbound I-695 to eastbound MD 43 and from westbound MD 43 to westbound I-695. The state highway heads east as a four-lane divided limited-access highway through the forested valley of Whitemarsh Run. As MD 43 passes through the community of Fullerton, the highway has intersections with county-maintained Walther Boulevard and a pair of two-way quadrant ramps that connect the boulevard with either direction of US 1 (Belair Road), under which MD 43 passes between the pair of ramps. The state highway continues east into the planned community of White Marsh where the highway has intersections with Perry Hall Boulevard and Honeygo Boulevard, which serve White Marsh Town Center and its centerpiece, White Marsh Mall.

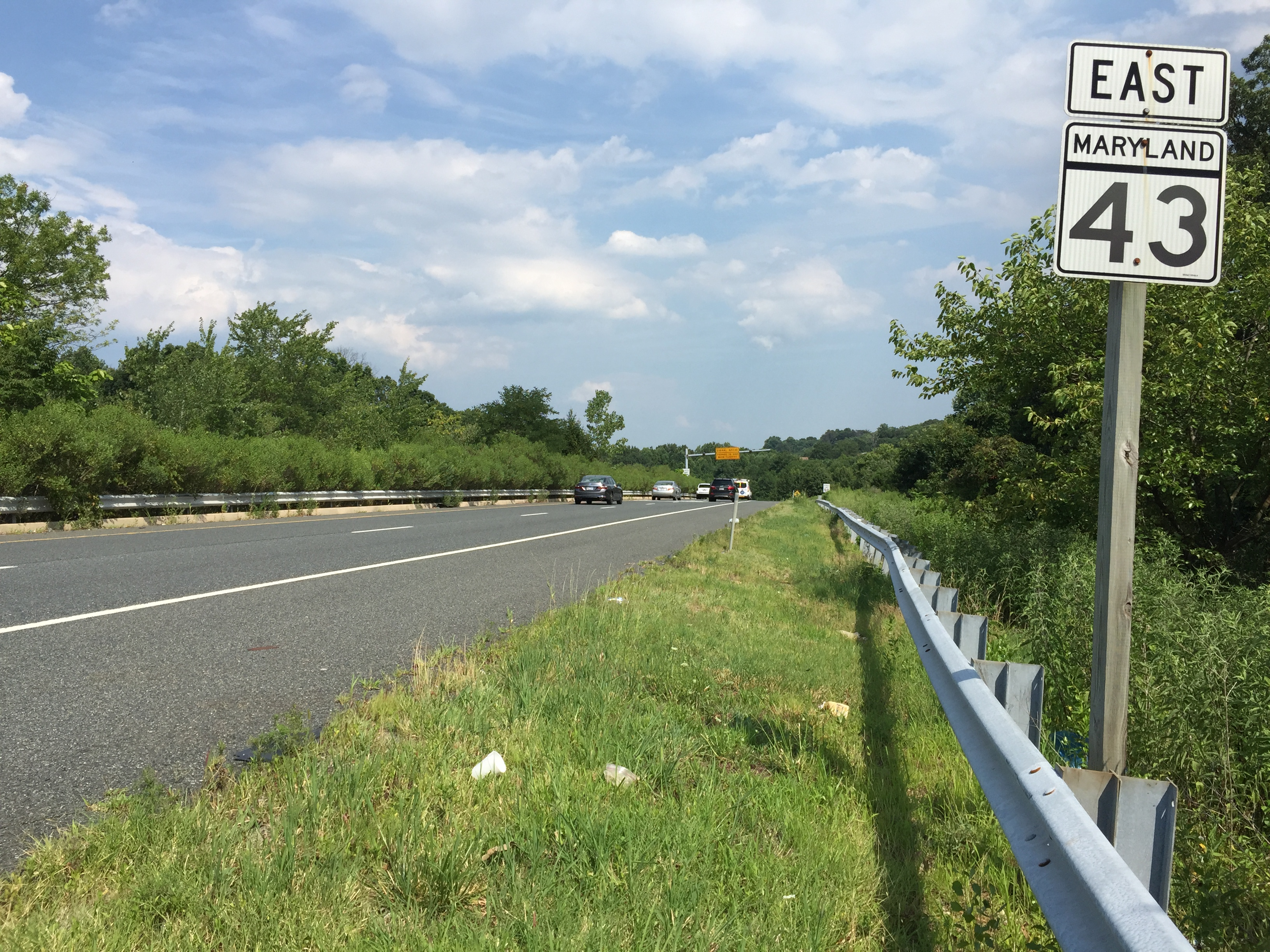
View east along MD 43 just east of I-695 near Parkville

East of the town center, MD 43 veers away from Whitemarsh Run and meets I-95 (John F. Kennedy Memorial Highway) at an interchange; this interchange has full access to I-95 along with access to the southbound direction of the I-95 Express Lanes and from the northbound direction of the I-95 Express Lanes. Past I-95, the route has a partial interchange with MD 7 (Philadelphia Road). The state highway continues east over CSX's Philadelphia Subdivision railroad line and US 40 (Pulaski Highway). The US 40 interchange includes a two-way quadrant ramp between the two highways and a direct ramp from southbound US 40 to westbound MD 43. East of US 40, the state highway crosses over Whitemarsh Run, which heads north to its mouth at the tidal Bird River, itself a tributary of the Gunpowder River. MD 43 curves southeast through a forested area with scattered industrial parks, where the highway crosses over Bird River Road and Windlass Run and intersects Crossroads Circle. The state highway continues southwest into Middle River, crossing over Amtrak's Northeast Corridor railroad line before reaching its eastern terminus at MD 150 (Eastern Boulevard) just east of the Martin State Airport station on MARC's Penn Line and Martin State Airport.

MD 43 is a part of the National Highway System as a principal arterial for its entire length.

== History ==
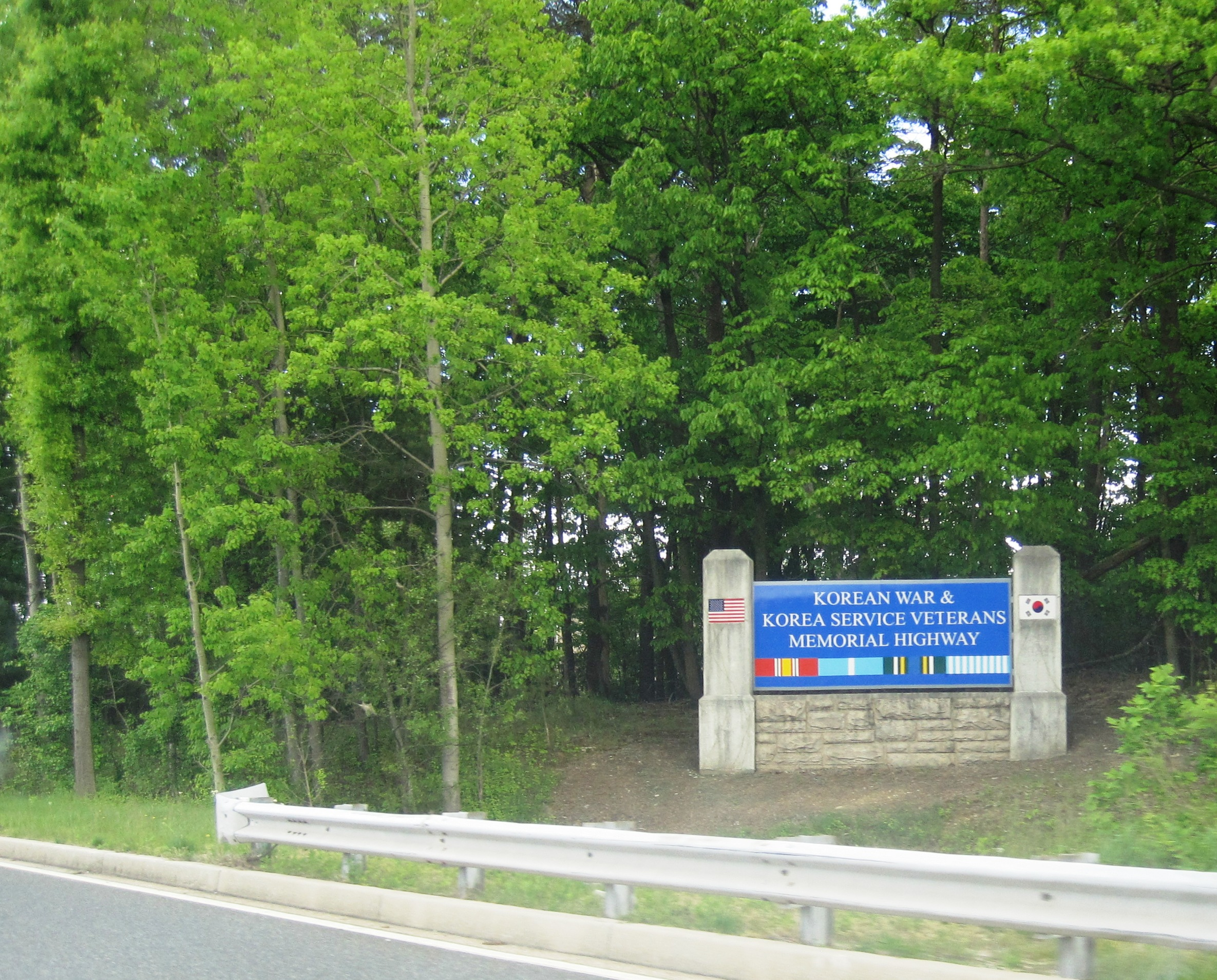
Sign noting the designation of MD 43 as the Korean War and Korea Service Veterans Memorial Highway

White Marsh Boulevard was constructed concurrent with the portion of I-95 between the boulevard and I-695 in 1962 and 1963. The state highway, which was marked as MD 43 by 1965, originally consisted of a four-lane divided section from the Honeygo Boulevard intersection east to US 40, under which the highway passed then followed the present two-way ramp to an intersection with the U.S. Highway. The original highway also had its modern cloverleaf interchange with I-95 and an underpass of MD 7 with no access. At its western end, MD 43 turned north as a two-lane road along what is now Honeygo Boulevard to its western terminus at Silver Spring Road. Around 1983, in conjunction with the construction of White Marsh Town Center, the state highway's western terminus was moved to just east of the Honeygo Boulevard intersection, which became a three-way directional intersection with an overpass for traffic from westbound MD 43 south onto Honeygo Boulevard toward White Marsh Mall.

Construction on the western extension of MD 43 from White Marsh Town Center west to I-695 began in 1989 with construction of bridges. The roadways, including the interchange ramps at US 1, were under construction by 1991. MD 43 was rebuilt at Honeygo Boulevard and completed west to I-695 in January 1993. Around 1997, the pair of ramps at MD 7 were added. Work on the eastern extension of MD 43 from US 40 east to Middle River began with bridge work in 2004. The state highway was completed east to MD 150 on October 23, 2006, opening up a large area of eastern Baltimore County to commercial and industrial development.

In 2001, the entire highway was dedicated as the Korean War Veterans Memorial Highway with signage added in 2007 formally naming it the Korean War and Korea Service Veterans Memorial Highway.

== Junction list ==
The entire route is in Baltimore County.

Location	mi	km	Destinations	Notes
Parkville	0.00	0.00	I-695 west (Baltimore Beltway) – Towson	Western terminus; I-695 Exit 31C; eastbound exit from and westbound entrance to I-695
Overlea	1.02	1.64	US 1 south (Belair Road) – Fullerton	Two-way ramp between MD 43 and southbound US 1
Perry Hall	1.69	2.72	US 1 north (Belair Road) – Perry Hall	Two-way ramp between MD 43 and northbound US 1
White Marsh	4.22	6.79	I-95 (John F. Kennedy Memorial Highway) – Baltimore, New York	I-95 Exit 67
White Marsh	4.22	6.79	I-95 Express south – No access to I-695	Northbound exit from and southbound entrance to I-95 Express Lanes; E-ZPass or Video Tolling
White Marsh	4.76	7.66	MD 7 (Philadelphia Road) – Rosedale, Joppatowne	Eastbound exit and westbound entrance
White Marsh	5.15	8.29	US 40 (Pulaski Highway) – Baltimore, Aberdeen	Two-way ramp between MD 43 and US 40
Middle River	8.65	13.92	MD 150 (Eastern Boulevard) – Essex, Chase	Eastern terminus; access to Martin State Airport station
1.000 mi = 1.609 km; 1.000 km = 0.621 mi: Electronic toll collection; Incomplete access
