= Maryland Route 267 =

State highway in Maryland, United States

Maryland Route 267
- Maryland Route 267 highlighted in red

Route information
- Maintained by MDSHA
- Length: 1.90 mi (3.06 km)
- Existed: 1927–present

Major junctions
- West end: MD 7 west of Charlestown
- East end: MD 7 east of Charlestown

Location
- Country: United States
- State: Maryland
- Counties: Cecil

Highway system
- Maryland highway system; Interstate; US; State; Scenic Byways
← MD 265	→ MD 268

Maryland Route 267 (MD 267) is a state highway in the U.S. state of Maryland. The highway runs 1.90 miles (3.06 km) through Charlestown between two intersections with MD 7 in southwestern Cecil County. MD 267, which follows the path of the Old Post Road between Baltimore and Philadelphia, was constructed as a modern highway along that main line in 1915. The highway was bypassed by what is now MD 7 in 1921 to avoid a pair of dangerous bridges across what is now Amtrak's Northeast Corridor railroad line. Those two bridges and adjacent sections of MD 267 were replaced west and east of Charlestown in the mid-1960s and mid-1970s, respectively.

== Route description ==
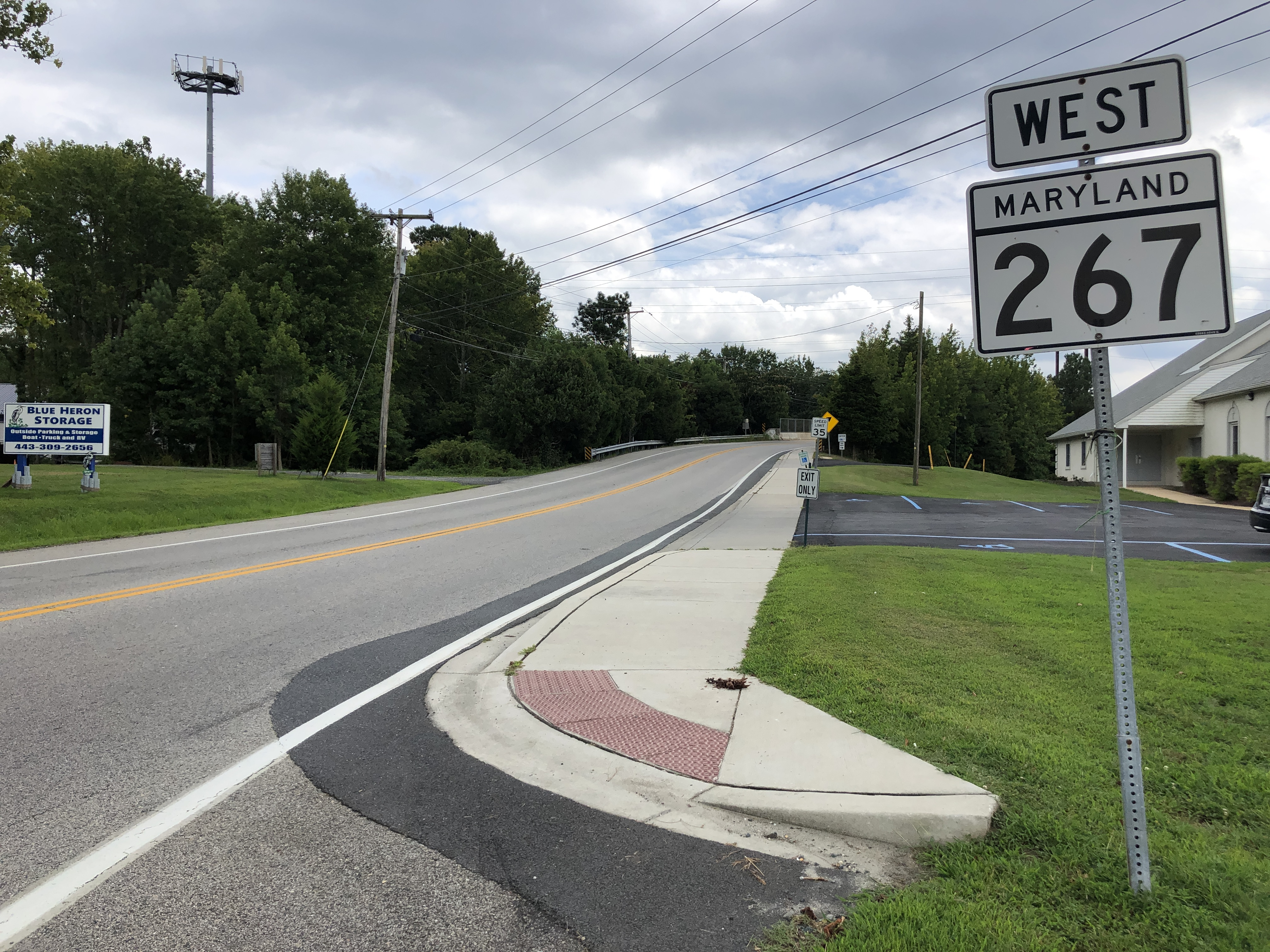
View west along MD 267 at MD 7 just east of Charlestown

MD 267 begins at an intersection with MD 7 (Philadelphia Road) west of Charlestown. The state highway heads east as two-lane undivided Baltimore Street, which immediately crosses over Amtrak's Northeast Corridor railroad line and enters the town of Charlestown. After intersecting Carpenters Point Road, MD 267 enters the Charlestown Historic District. After passing south of Charlestown Elementary School, the state highway turns north onto Cecil Street and crosses Red Rum Run. The state highway becomes Market Street after making a right-angle turn to the east and passes the Indian Queen Tavern and Black's Store, then turns north again onto Bladen Street. After crossing Peddlers Run Creek, leaving the historic district, and leaving the town limits, MD 267 crosses over the railroad tracks again and reaches its eastern terminus at MD 7 east of Charlestown.

== History ==
MD 267 traces the path of the Old Post Road between Baltimore and Philadelphia blazed during the 18th century, during which Charlestown was the county seat of Cecil County. The Post Road from Perryville to Elkton was part of the state road system proposed by the State Roads Commission in 1909. The highway through Charlestown was constructed as a 14-foot-wide (4.3 m) macadam road in 1915. The highway through Charlestown was bypassed when the Charlestown Cut-Off (later U.S. Route 40, now MD 7) was constructed in 1921, eliminating two dangerous bridges across the Pennsylvania Railroad (now Amtrak) from the course of the main highway. The western bridge, named Weber's Bridge or Weavers Bridge, crossed over the railroad perpendicularly east of the current crossing and featured a sharp curve on the south side of the tracks and an intersection with MD 7 immediately to the north. This bridge was reconstructed in 1951. The eastern bridge, named Heisler's Bridge, also crossed the railroad perpendicularly east of the current crossing and had a right-angle turn immediately to the south of the crossing near Clearview Avenue. MD 267 was relocated and Weber's Bridge was replaced in 1966 and 1967. The bypassed piece of highway became MD 913. Heisler's Bridge was replaced and the adjacent state highway relocated between 1973 and 1975. A portion of the bypassed highway east of Charlestown was conveyed from the state to the adjacent property owners in 1974.

== Junction list ==
The entire route is in Charlestown, Cecil County.

mi	km	Destinations	Notes
0.00	0.00	MD 7 (Philadelphia Road) – Perryville	Western terminus
1.90	3.06	MD 7 (Philadelphia Road) – North East	Eastern terminus
1.000 mi = 1.609 km; 1.000 km = 0.621 mi
