= Baltimore beating =

This can refer to:

- 2010 Baltimore beating
- 2012 St. Patrick's Day beating
- 2011 Rosedale, Maryland beating
