= Fullerton, Maryland =

Unincorporated community in Maryland, U.S.

Coordinates: 39°22′18″N 076°30′40″W

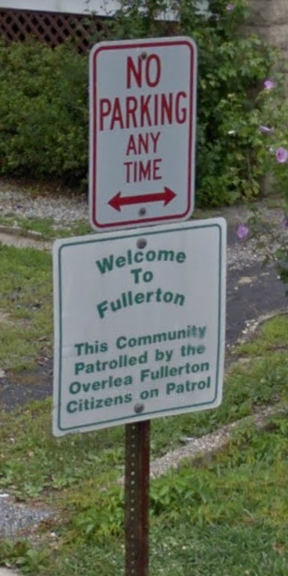
The "Welcome to Fullerton" sign, located at 41 Henry Avenue

Fullerton is an unincorporated community (part of northern Overlea) in Baltimore County, Maryland, United States. The area is often considered part of Nottingham, despite being part of Overlea. Fullerton residents have either 21236 or 21206 as their ZIP code.

== History ==
In 1976, Fullerton Elementary School was established. The school colours are green and yellow, and the mascot is a mouse. As of 2014, the school served 553 pre-K-to-fifth-grade students and employed thirty-three teachers. The attendance rate in 2011 and 2012 was equal to or greater than 95 percent. Every Independence Day, a fireworks show is put on at Fullerton Park, a field adjacent to the school.2013 Schedule of Fireworks Displays,

The movie theatre Beltway Movies 6 (located in the Belair Beltway Plaza shopping centre) was featured in the 2000 John Waters film Cecil B. Demented.

There was a major fire at an empty building owned by the Schmidt Baking Company on Fitch Lane in Fullerton in April, 2008.

In 2013, police received numerous complaints about rowdy teens being loud and destructive around a roller rink known as Skate Land, located behind the local Denny's. The troubles prompted the county to withhold renewal of the venue's amusement hall license; the county had also threatened to revoke the hall's skating license. After negotiations with the county, Skate Land is now only permitted to hold parties and events Monday through Thursday, and only until 9 P.M.

== Locations in Fullerton ==
=== Major roads ===
- U. S. Route 1 (Belair Road)
- I-95 (J.F.K. Memorial Highway)
- I-695 (Baltimore Beltway)

==== Other roads ====
- Fullerton Avenue
- Kenwood Avenue (MD 588)
- Lillian Holt Drive
- Perry Hall Boulevard
- Putty Hill Avenue
- Rossville Boulevard
- White Marsh Boulevard (MD 43)

=== Parks ===
- Belmar Park
- Fullerton Park
- Lillian Holt Park and Center for the Arts
- Linover Park

=== Churches ===
- Kenwood Presbyterian Church
- St. Joseph Church
- St. Michael the Archangel Church

=== Other locations ===
- Baltimore County Central Alarmers #155 (fire department)
- Chesley Place (home of the Natural History Society of Maryland)
- Fullerton Community Center
- Fullerton Dental Care
- Fullerton Elementary School
- Fullerton Manor Bingo (bingo hall)
- Fullerton Mini Storage (self-storage facility)
- Fullerton Pub & Crab House
- Fullerton Reservoir
- Gardens of Faith Memorial Gardens (cemetery)
- Lassahn Funeral Home
- Overlea-Fullerton Recreation Center
- Overlea Fullerton Senior Center
- Sipple Farm
