= Maryland Route 7 =

State highway in Maryland, US

Maryland Route 7
- Maryland Route 7 highlighted in red

Route information
- Maintained by MDSHA and Town of Perryville
- Existed: 1938–present
- Tourist routes: Lower Susquehanna Scenic Byway

Location
- Country: United States
- State: Maryland
- Counties: Baltimore, Harford, Cecil

Highway system
- Maryland highway system; Interstate; US; State; Scenic Byways
← MD 6	→ MD 8

Maryland Route 7 (MD 7) is a collection of state highways in the U.S. state of Maryland. Known for much of their length as Philadelphia Road, there are five disjoint mainline sections of the highway totaling 40.23 miles (64.74 km) that parallel U.S. Route 40 (US 40) in Baltimore, Harford, and Cecil counties in northeastern Maryland. The longest section of MD 7 begins at US 40 just east of the city of Baltimore in Rosedale and extends through eastern Baltimore County and southern Harford County to US 40 in Aberdeen. The next segment of the state highway is a C-shaped route through Havre de Grace on the west bank of the Susquehanna River. The third mainline section of MD 7 begins in Perryville on the east bank of the Susquehanna River and ends at US 40 a short distance west of the start of the fourth section, which passes through Charlestown and North East before ending at US 40, just west of Elkton. The fifth segment of the highway begins at South Street and passes through the eastern part of Elkton before reconnecting with US 40 east of Elkton and west of the Delaware state line.

MD 7 is the old alignment of US 40 in northeastern Maryland. The route was first laid out early in colonial times and later formed part of the post road between Baltimore and Philadelphia (going further north to New York City and into New England to Boston) and between the northern and southern of the original Thirteen Colonies on the East Coast. The highway in Baltimore and Harford counties became a turnpike, constructed and operated by a private stockholder company in the early 19th century. The Maryland State Roads Commission (established 1908 - now the Maryland State Highway Administration within the Maryland Department of Transportation since the early 1970s) marked portions of what became known as the Philadelphia Road, close to Baltimore and between Perryville and Elkton for improvement as state roads in 1909. Those sections and the highway between Aberdeen and Havre de Grace were constructed as modern roads in the early to mid-1910s. The remainder of the highway was constructed in the 1920s and designated as US 40 in 1927. The high volume of traffic and the required continuous expansion of the highway led the old Maryland State Roads Commission to construct the modern Pulaski Highway (named for the Polish cavalry officer Casimir Pulaski [1745-1779], who fought in the American Revolutionary War [1775-1783]), which was constructed during the "Great Depression" years between 1935 and 1941. Old sections of US 40 became segments of MD 7 between 1938 and 1941 as portions of the new four-lane divided highway were opened from Baltimore to Elkton.

== Route description ==
There are five mainline sections of MD 7:

- MD 7 (without suffix) runs 22.83 miles (36.74 km) from US 40 in Rosedale to US 40 and MD 159 in Aberdeen.
- MD 7A extends 2.66 miles (4.28 km) from US 40 west of Havre de Grace to US 40 and MD 155 in the city.
- MD 7B has a length of 3.56 miles (5.73 km) from Perry Point VA Medical Center in Perryville to US 40 east of Perryville.
- MD 7C runs 9.73 miles (15.66 km) from US 40 west of Charlestown east to US 40 and MD 279 west of Elkton.
- MD 7D spans 1.45 miles (2.33 km) from South Street east to US 40 within Elkton.

=== Baltimore–Aberdeen ===
Maryland Route 7
- Location: Baltimore–Aberdeen
- Length: 22.83 mi (36.74 km)

MD 7 begins at an intersection with US 40 (Pulaski Highway) in Rosedale just east of the Baltimore city line. The highway heads north then immediately turns east at a three-way intersection; the west leg of the intersection is Old Philadelphia Road, which is unsigned MD 7BA. MD 7 heads northeast as a two-lane undivided street through a residential neighborhood with scattered businesses and industrial properties as well as a crossing of Redhouse Creek. The route intersects MD 588 (Golden Ring Road) and expands to a five-lane road with a center left-turn lane before meeting Interstate 695 (I-695, Baltimore Beltway) at a partial cloverleaf interchange. MD 7 continues east past The Centre at Golden Ring shopping center, crossing Stemmers Run before its intersection with Rossville Boulevard in Rossville. The state highway reduces to two lanes and continues northeast through residential subdivisions on the westbound side and industrial facilities on the eastbound side of the highway.

MD 7 expands to a five-lane highway with a center left-turn lane as it approaches Campbell Boulevard in White Marsh. The road passes between a pair of shopping centers before crossing White Marsh Run. MD 7 continues northeast between industrial parks, intersecting Industrial Park Road (unsigned MD 7J) before reducing to two lanes and crossing MD 43 (White Marsh Boulevard). Westbound MD 43 is accessed via a ramp east of the overpass. The state highway crosses Honeygo Run and passes through a mix of forest and residential subdivisions, intersecting Cowenton Avenue and Joppa Road before crossing Gunpowder Falls. MD 7 passes through farmland and intersects Bradshaw Road in the hamlet of Bradshaw before crossing Little Gunpowder Falls and entering Harford County.

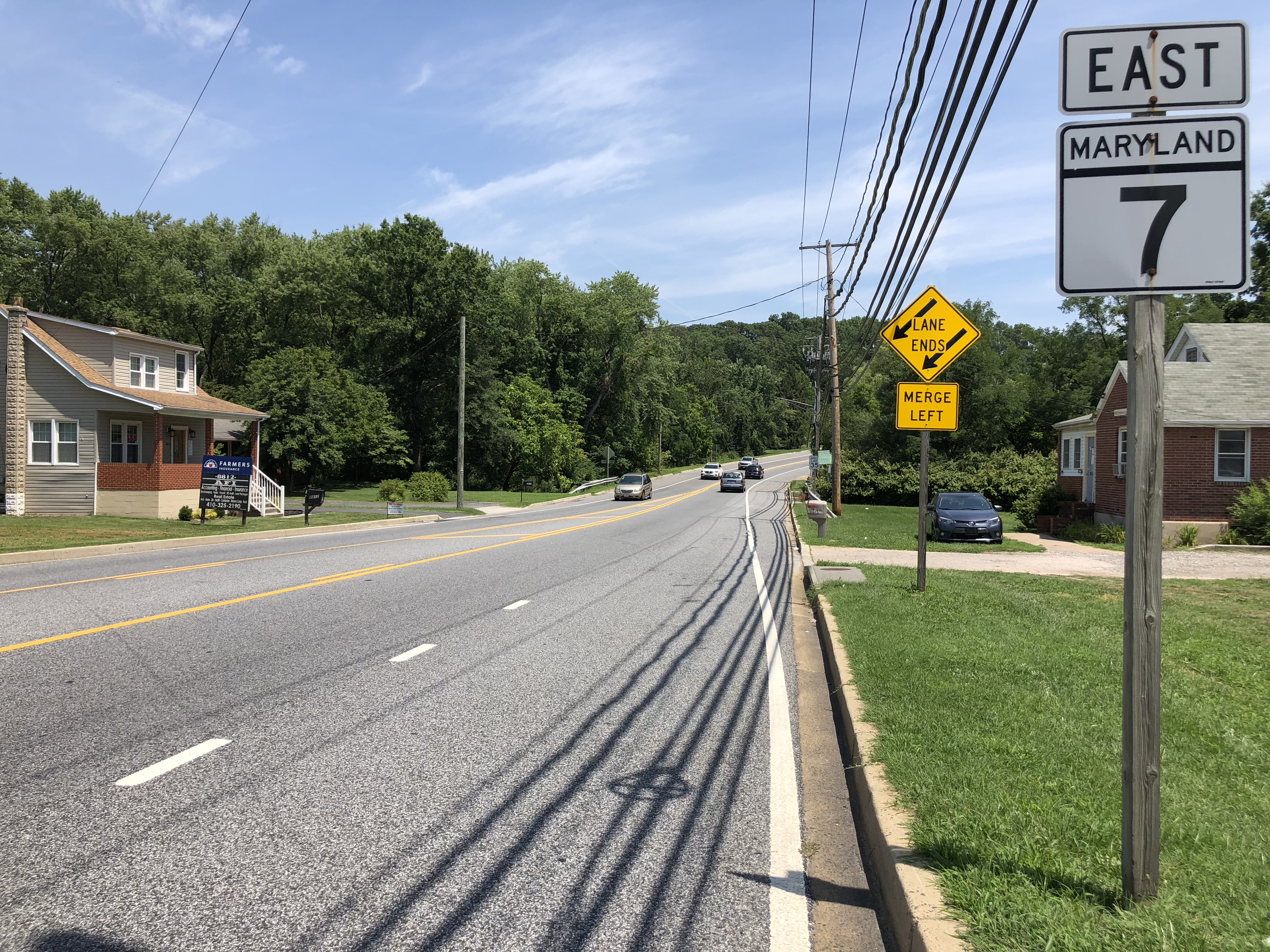
MD 7 eastbound in Rossville

MD 7 heads east through forest and scattered residential subdivisions through the northern fringe of Joppatowne, where the highway intersects Old Mountain Road and MD 152 (Mountain Road). The route crosses Winters Run and intersects Edgewood Road and MD 24 (Vietnam Veterans Memorial Highway) in Edgewood. MD 7 crosses Haha Branch and meets Abingdon Road at Abingdon, which is home to the Nelson-Reardon-Kennard House. The highway intersects MD 136 (Calvary Road) in between crossings of Bynum Run and James Run, which flow into the Bush River. MD 7 temporarily expands to a four-lane divided highway as it passes through the commercial area of Riverside, where the highway meets MD 543 (Creswell Road) just south of that highway's interchange with I-95. The road passes through forest with isolated residential subdivisions, with roundabouts located at Seven Trails Drive and Holly Oak Circle.

MD 7's name changes to Old Philadelphia Road as it crosses Grays Run. Beyond Stepney Road, the state highway curves to the southeast to cross over CSX's Philadelphia Subdivision railroad line, passing between industrial parks before reaching its eastern terminus at US 40 (Pulaski Highway) on the western edge of Aberdeen. Old Philadelphia Road continues east as MD 159 before becoming a county highway that serves an industrial area, intersects MD 715 (Short Lane), and passes the historic home Poplar Hill, after which the highway merges with US 40 just west of downtown Aberdeen.

=== Havre de Grace ===
Maryland Route 7A
- Location: Havre de Grace
- Length: 2.66 mi (4.28 km)
- Tourist routes: Lower Susquehanna Scenic Byway

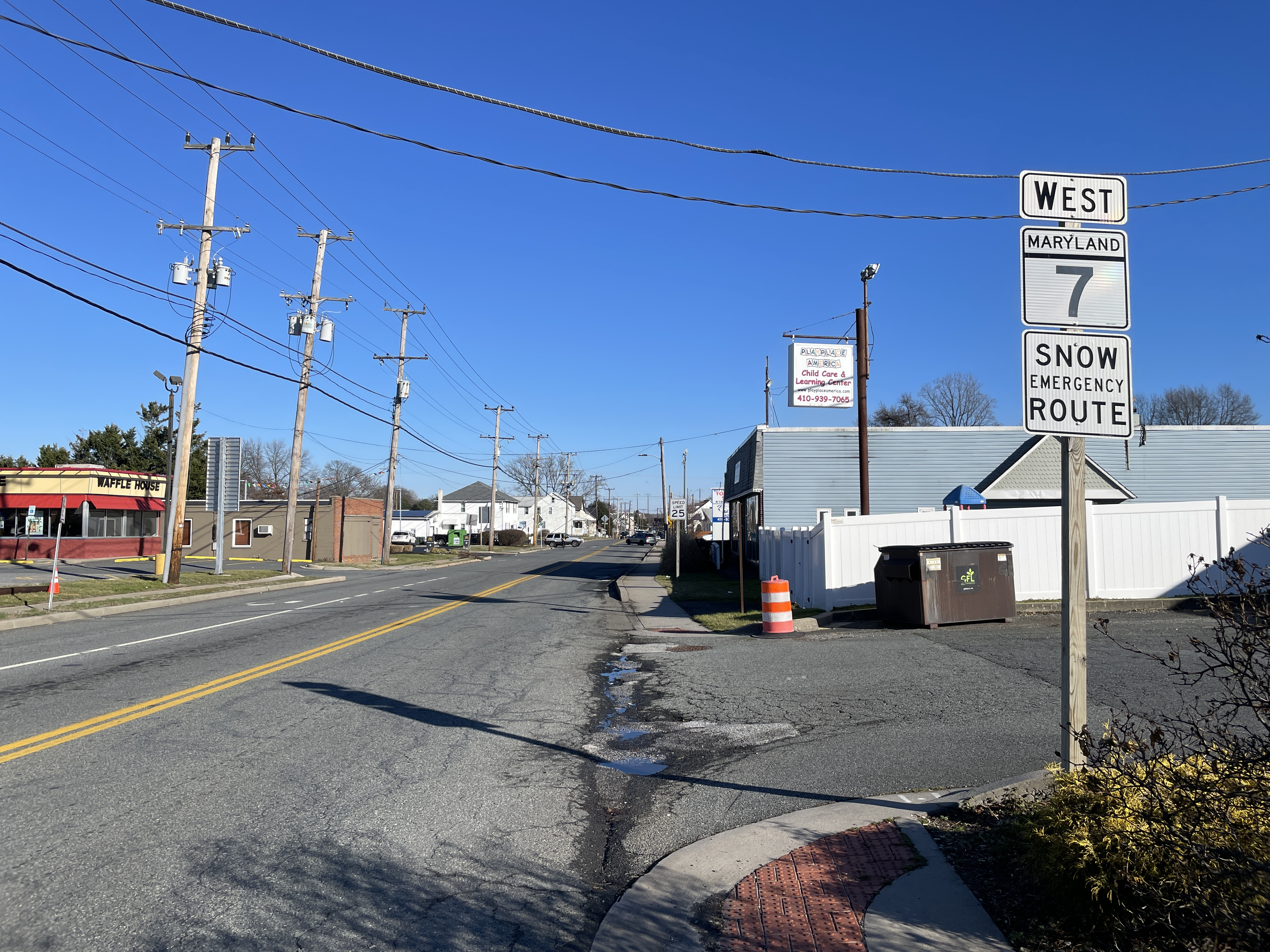
View west along MD 7 past US 40 and MD 155 in Havre de Grace

MD 7 begins at an intersection with US 40 just west of Havre de Grace. The highway heads northeast as two-lane undivided Revolution Street, crossing over Amtrak's Northeast Corridor railroad line and passing through an industrial area before entering a residential area upon entering the city limits. The route comes to a grade crossing with Norfolk Southern Railway's Havre de Grace Industrial Track. MD 7 veers east to enter the street grid at Bloomsbury Avenue. The state highway turns north onto Union Street, which heads south as MD 490, adjacent to the former University of Maryland Harford Memorial Hospital. The route heads through the Havre de Grace Historic District, passing through a residential area about four blocks from the Susquehanna River waterfront through Congress Street, where the highway begins to approach the waterfront. Immediately after passing under the Amtrak Susquehanna River Bridge, MD 7 turns west onto Otsego Street. The road crosses Juniata Street, where a park and ride lot is located on the southwest corner of the intersection. The highway reaches its northern terminus at a five-way intersection with Otsego Street, MD 155 (Ohio Street), and US 40 (Pulaski Highway), which crosses the Susquehanna River a short distance to the east on the Thomas J. Hatem Memorial Bridge.

=== Perryville ===
Maryland Route 7B
- Location: Perryville
- Length: 3.56 mi (5.73 km)

MD 7 begins at the entrance to the Perry Point VA Medical Center just north and east of the Amtrak Susquehanna River Bridge adjacent to Rodgers Tavern in the town of Perryville. The highway heads east as two-lane undivided and municipally maintained Broad Street, passing under both railroad tracks of the wye of Norfolk Southern Railway's Port Road Branch line with Amtrak's Northeast Corridor, within which is the Perryville station that serves as the terminus of MARC's Penn Line. Maintenance responsibility transfers from the town of Perryville to the state at MD 222 (Aiken Avenue). MD 7 heads east over Mill Creek, past MD 327 (Ikea Way), and leaves the town limits after an intersection with Coudon Boulevard, which leads to US 40. The route continues east as Principio Furnace Road through farmland, passing the historic home Woodlands and Furnace Bay Golf Course. MD 7 passes the remains of Principio Furnace and crosses Principio Creek before reaching its eastern terminus at US 40.

=== Charlestown–Elkton ===
Maryland Route 7C
- Location: Charlestown–Elkton
- Length: 9.73 mi (15.66 km)

MD 7 begins at US 40 (Pulaski Highway) northwest of Charlestown, a short distance east of the terminus of MD 7B. The highway heads southeast as two-lane undivided Old Philadelphia Road in a forested area between a pair of quarries. As MD 7 approaches Amtrak's Northeast Corridor, MD 267 (Baltimore Street) splits to the southeast and crosses the tracks to pass through Charlestown, while MD 7 begins to closely parallel the tracks along the northern edge of the town. The state highway receives the other end of MD 267 (Bladen Street) as it curves away from the railroad. MD 7 crosses Broad Creek and Stony Run before passing under the Amtrak line.

MD 7 crosses North East Creek and enters the town of North East, where the highway is known as Cecil Avenue. The highway intersects MD 272, which follows a one-way pair, Main Street southbound and Mauldin Avenue northbound. MD 7 leaves the town and passes through a forested area with scattered residences as Old Philadelphia Road. The route passes through an S-curve during which it crosses over a bridge to the north side of Amtrak's Northeast Corridor. On the north side of the bridge is a stub of old alignment, MD 7H. MD 7 continues east, passing Old Elk Neck Road before turning north and reaching its eastern terminus at US 40. The roadway continues beyond the intersection as MD 279 (Elkton Road).

=== Elkton ===
Maryland Route 7D
- Location: Elkton
- Length: 1.45 mi (2.33 km)

MD 7 begins at South Street east of downtown Elkton, heading east on two-lane undivided East Main Street. Main Street continues west into downtown Elkton as a municipally-maintained road. A short distance past MD 7's western terminus, Main Street continues east as MD 281 while MD 7 turns southeast onto Delaware Avenue. The state highway crosses Big Elk Creek and passes through a residential area before reaching its eastern terminus at US 40 (Pulaski Highway) about 2 miles (3.2 km) west of the Delaware state line.

== History ==
=== Predecessor roads and state road construction ===
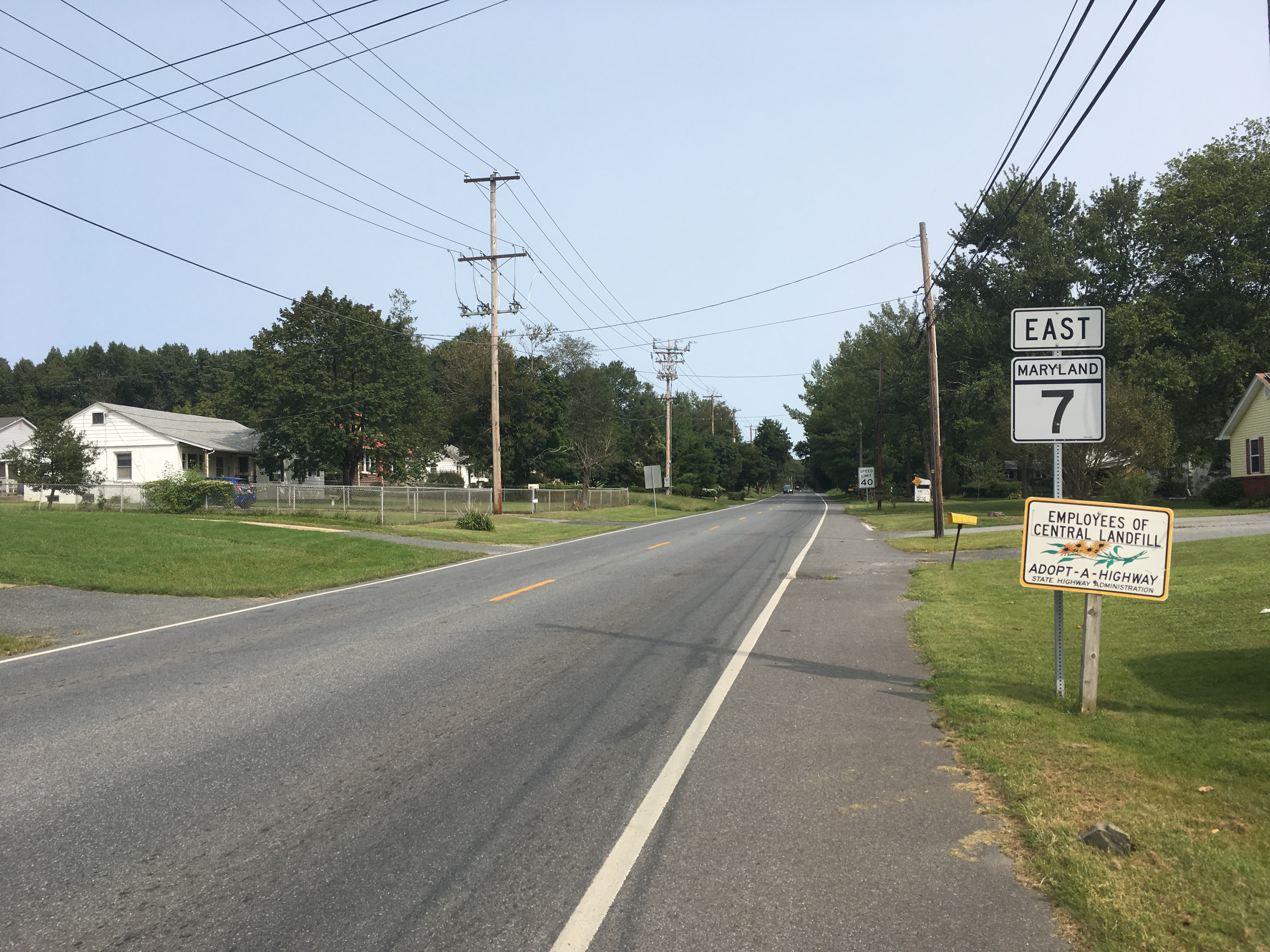
MD 7 eastbound leaving North East

The rough alignment of what is now MD 7 in Baltimore and Harford counties existed by 1695 as a rudimentary road; Baltimore County ordered that the road be widened to 30 feet (9.1 m) in width to allow easy passage for carts and for bridges to replace ferries at the numerous creeks along the route. In 1717, the route from Baltimore to Elkton became part of a new overland post road between Philadelphia and Williamsburg, Virginia. The highway between Baltimore and Havre de Grace was maintained as a turnpike, the Baltimore and Havre-de-Grace Turnpike, by 1825. This turnpike later became known as the Baltimore and Philadelphia Turnpike and, after collection of tolls had ceased on the highway, the Philadelphia Road or the Post Road. The final ferry along the route to be eliminated was the Susquehanna River crossing. The first vehicular bridge was a converted railroad bridge built by the Pennsylvania Railroad in 1873, replaced with the current Amtrak bridge immediately to the north in 1904, and converted into a tolled vehicular bridge owned by several citizens of Harford and Cecil counties in 1910. The Maryland State Roads Commission purchased the bridge in 1923 and removed the tolls in 1928. In 1926, the commission double-decked the bridge to increase the bridge's capacity.

When the Maryland State Roads Commission laid out a proposed state road system in 1909, two sections of the Philadelphia Road were included: from the eastern city limit of Baltimore, then at Elwood Avenue, east to Rossville in Baltimore County, and from Perryville to Elkton. The highway was paved as an 18-foot (5.5 m) wide tarred macadam road from Elwood Avenue to Herring Run in 1910. The remainder of the road from Herring Run to Rossville was completed in concrete by 1921. In Cecil County, the Philadelphia Road was paved with a 14-foot (4.3 m) wide macadam surface from the eastern town limit of North East to the western town limit of Elkton in 1913. The highway was paved in concrete from Perryville to Principio Creek and in macadam from there through Charlestown in 1914. The state road was paved in macadam from Charlestown to North East, including Cecil Avenue within the latter, in 1915. The section of the state road through Charlestown, which is now MD 267, was bypassed with a concrete road that remained on the north side of the Pennsylvania Railroad by 1921.

The section of the Post Road between Bel Air Avenue in Aberdeen and the former racetrack in Havre de Grace, much of which is now MD 132, was paved under the state aid system as a 14-foot (4.3 m) wide macadam road by 1911. The first section of the gap between Rossville and Aberdeen was filled with a concrete road from Bradshaw to Winters Run by 1921. The remainder of the highway in Baltimore County and the section from Winters Run to Bynum Run were paved in concrete by 1923. The final piece of Philadelphia Road in Harford County was completed as a concrete road from Bynum Run to Aberdeen in 1926. The highway was paved in concrete along Main Street and Delaware Avenue through Elkton, with the exception of a gap at the west end of town, by 1923. The gap between Elkton and the Delaware state line was filled in 1925. The 1,100-foot (340 m) gap at the west end of Elkton was left in inferior condition in anticipation of a grade separation of the Pennsylvania Railroad. This grade separation and its approaches was completed in 1929, completing US 40, which had been assigned to the length of the Philadelphia Road in 1927.

=== Improvements and construction of Pulaski Highway ===
Improvements to US 40 began shortly after its designation. The highway was widened to 20 feet (6.1 m) in width from Baltimore to Rosedale and from Aberdeen to Havre de Grace, and to 18 feet (5.5 m) between Rosedale and Aberdeen, by 1930. US 40 was also widened to 17 to 24 feet (5.2 to 7.3 m) from Perryville to the Delaware state line by 1934. The Cecil County section of the highway was widened again with a pair of 3-foot (0.91 m) shoulders in 1937 and 1938. The U.S. Highway was relocated to its present alignment through Aberdeen to eliminate a pair of crossings of the Pennsylvania Railroad between 1930 and 1933; the old highway south of the railroad tracks became an extension of MD 22. However, the very high levels of traffic due to being the main highway between Baltimore and Philadelphia led to calls for the highway to be expanded to 40 feet (12 m) in width along its entire length by 1934.

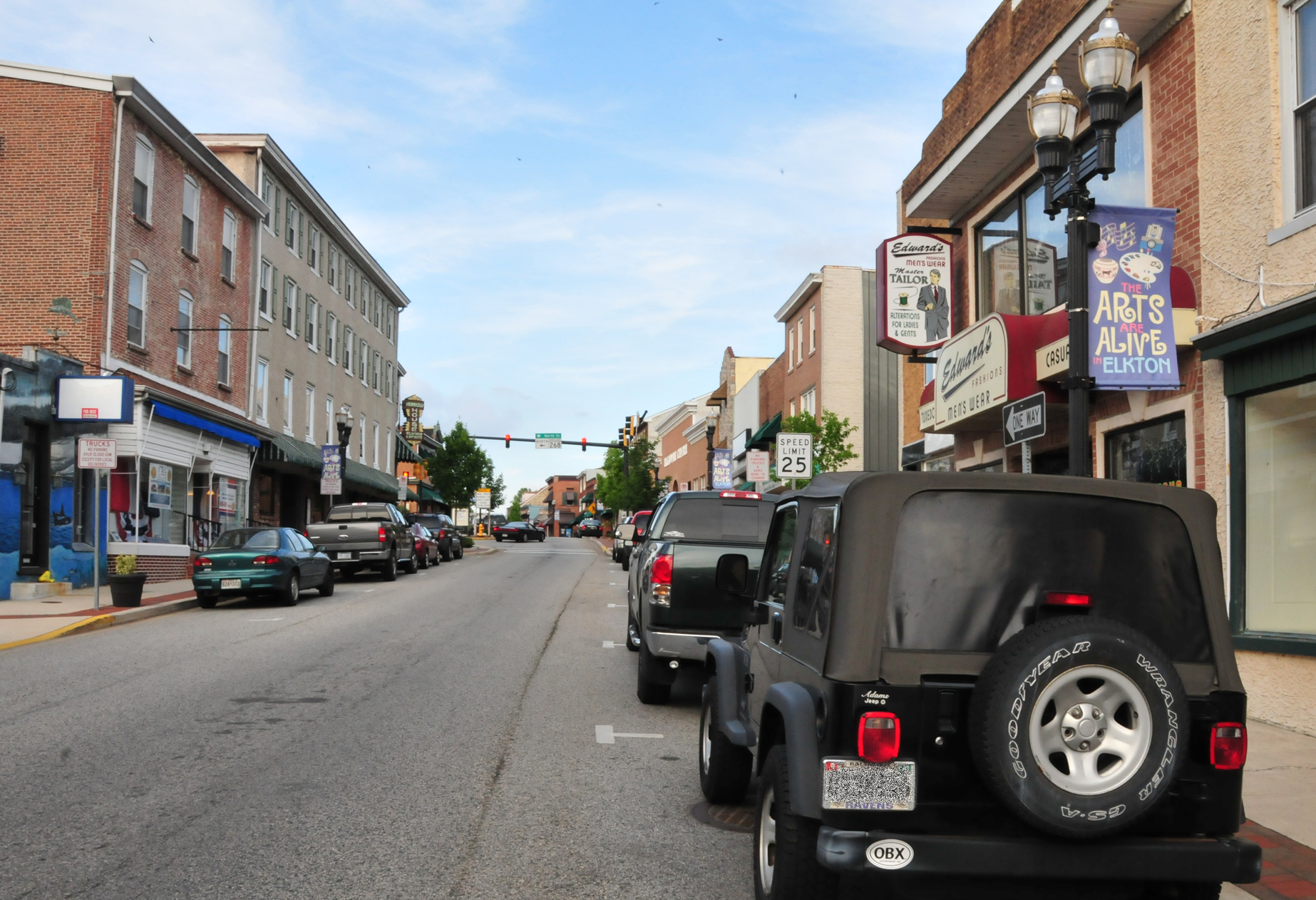
Former MD 7 eastbound on Main Street in Elkton approaching MD 268 in 2009

Rather than widen the existing road further, the Maryland State Roads Commission decided to build a new Philadelphia Road, later known as Pulaski Highway, as a divided highway on a new alignment between Baltimore and Aberdeen and to expand the newly relocated highway through Aberdeen to Havre de Grace to a four-lane divided highway. The new US 40 was started in 1935 and completed in 1938. The original Philadelphia Road between Baltimore and Aberdeen became the first section of MD 7. The next sections of the old highway to be bypassed were in Havre de Grace and Perryville when the Thomas J. Hatem Memorial Bridge and its approaches opened in August 1940, replacing the double-decked converted railroad bridge. The portions of the old highway on either side of the river became additional sections of MD 7. Construction on the new Philadelphia Road in Cecil County began in 1938 and was completed in 1941. Transfer of US 40 to its new alignment resulted in the addition of two more sections of MD 7 from west of Charlestown through North East to west of Elkton and through Elkton.

Despite the bypassing of the original Philadelphia Road, improvements continued to be made to MD 7. The state highway was widened with dual 7 feet (2.1 m) shoulders from the Baltimore city limit to Rossville in 1938. MD 7 was widened through Havre de Grace in 1953 and through Elkton in 1954. The highway was relocated and became a divided highway on both sides of its intersection with MD 543 in Riverside concurrent with the construction of MD 543's interchange with I-95 in 1989. MD 7's roundabout at Holly Oak Circle in Riverside was installed in 2000. Several portions of the state highway have been transferred to local maintenance. The portion of MD 7 to the south of US 40 in the southern portion of Aberdeen was removed in 1950; MD 159 was extended north to MD 7's new eastern terminus and the remainder of Old Philadelphia Road became the responsibility of Harford County and Aberdeen. MD 7 between MD 213 and South Street in Elkton became one-way eastbound in 2001 and municipally maintained in 2003. The western terminus of that section of MD 7 was truncated at MD 213 in 2010, resulting in the portion of Main Street from a dead end at the Amtrak Northeast Corridor to MD 213 also becoming the responsibility of Elkton. In 2012, the MD 7 designation was removed from the portion of municipally-maintained roadway between MD 213 and South Street. In 2018, a roundabout was constructed at Seven Trails Drive.

== Junction list ==
=== MD 7 ===
County	Location	mi	km	Destinations	Notes
Baltimore	Rosedale	0.00	0.00	US 40 (Pulaski Highway) / 66th Street south – Baltimore, Aberdeen	Western terminus
Baltimore	Rosedale	0.04	0.064	Old Philadelphia Road west	Unsigned MD 7BA
Baltimore	Rosedale	2.25	3.62	MD 588 north (Golden Ring Road) / Golden Ring Road south – Overlea	Southern terminus of MD 588
Baltimore	Rosedale	2.52	4.06	I-695 (Baltimore Beltway) – Towson, Essex	I-695 Exit 34
Baltimore	White Marsh	6.43	10.35	Industrial Park Road east / Nottingham Drive west	Industrial Park Road is unsigned MD 7J and receives an exit ramp from eastbound MD 43.
Baltimore	White Marsh	6.62	10.65	MD 43 west (White Marsh Boulevard) to I-95	Entrance ramp to westbound MD 43 only
Harford	Joppatowne	13.56	21.82	MD 152 (Mountain Road) to I-95 – Fallston, Aberdeen Proving Ground	
Harford	Edgewood	16.03	25.80	MD 24 (Veterans Memorial Highway) to I-95 – Bel Air, Aberdeen Proving Ground	
Harford	Riverside	18.79	30.24	MD 136 north (Calvary Road) – Churchville	Southern terminus of MD 136
Harford	Riverside	19.76	31.80	MD 543 (Creswell Road) to I-95 – Belcamp, Churchville	
Harford	Aberdeen	22.83	36.74	US 40 (Philadelphia Boulevard) / MD 159 south (Old Philadelphia Road) – Havre de Grace, Perryman	Eastern terminus; northern terminus of MD 159
1.000 mi = 1.609 km; 1.000 km = 0.621 mi: Incomplete access

=== MD 7A ===
The entire route is in Havre de Grace, Harford County.

mi	km	Destinations	Notes
0.00	0.00	US 40 (Pulaski Highway) – Aberdeen	Southern terminus
1.46	2.35	MD 490 south (Union Avenue) / Revolution Street east – Concord Point Lighthouse, Decoy Museum, Maritime Museum	Northern terminus of MD 490; MD 7A turns north onto Union Avenue
2.12	3.41	Water Street north	MD 7A turns west onto Otsego Street
2.66	4.28	US 40 (Pulaski Highway) / MD 155 west (Ohio Street) / Otsego Street west – Aberdeen, Perryville, Churchville	Northern terminus; eastern terminus of MD 155
1.000 mi = 1.609 km; 1.000 km = 0.621 mi

=== MD 7B ===
The entire route is in Cecil County.

Location	mi	km	Destinations	Notes
Perryville	0.00	0.00	Entrance to Perry Point VA Medical Center	Western terminus
Perryville	0.45	0.72	MD 222 north (Aiken Avenue) – Perryville	Southern terminus of MD 222
Perryville	0.84	1.35	MD 327 east (Ikea Way)	Western terminus of MD 327
Perryville	1.09	1.75	Coudon Boulevard to US 40	
	3.56	5.73	US 40 (Pulaski Highway) / Belvidere Road north – Perryville	Eastern terminus
1.000 mi = 1.609 km; 1.000 km = 0.621 mi

=== MD 7C ===
The entire route is in Cecil County.

Location	mi	km	Destinations	Notes
	0.00	0.00	US 40 (Pulaski Highway) – Havre de Grace, Elkton	Western terminus
Charlestown	1.23	1.98	MD 267 east (Baltimore Street)	Western terminus of MD 267
Charlestown	2.55	4.10	MD 267 west (Bladen Street)	Eastern terminus of MD 267
North East	4.87	7.84	MD 272 south (Main Street) – Elk Neck State Park	
North East	4.94	7.95	MD 272 north (Mauldin Avenue) – Rising Sun	
Elkton	9.73	15.66	US 40 (Pulaski Highway) / MD 279 north (Elkton Road) – North East, Elkton, Newark	Eastern terminus; southern terminus of MD 279
1.000 mi = 1.609 km; 1.000 km = 0.621 mi

=== MD 7D ===
The entire route is in Elkton, Cecil County.

mi	km	Destinations	Notes
0.00	0.00	South Street / East Main Street west	Western terminus
0.20	0.32	MD 281 east (Main Street)	Western terminus of MD 281; MD 7 turns south onto Delaware Avenue
1.45	2.33	US 40 (Pulaski Highway) – Glasgow, DE	Eastern terminus
1.000 mi = 1.609 km; 1.000 km = 0.621 mi

== Auxiliary routes ==
MD 7 has six auxiliary routes:

- MD 7BA is the unsigned designation for Old Philadelphia Road, a 0.18-mile (0.29 km) section of old alignment of MD 7 at its western terminus. MD 7BA continues the alignment of MD 7 west, becoming one lane westbound until it merges with westbound US 40 just east of the Baltimore city line.
- MD 7E is the unsigned designation for the 0.09-mile (0.14 km) ramp from westbound US 40 to westbound MD 7D in Elkton.
- MD 7H is the unsigned designation for an unnamed 0.12-mile (0.19 km) section of old alignment of MD 7 on the north side of the Bacon Hill crossing of the Amtrak Northeast Corridor.
- MD 7J is the unsigned designation for Industrial Park Road, a highway that connects MD 7 with an exit ramp from eastbound MD 43 in White Marsh.
- MD 7K is the unsigned designation for Patriotic Lane, a 0.13-mile (0.21 km) road which runs from MD 7C east to the end of state maintenance, where it continues as an unnamed road, west of Elkton. The route was designated in 2012.
- MD 7L is the unsigned designation for an unnamed 0.075-mile (0.121 km) section of old alignment of MD 7 from MD 7C east to a dead end at a gate just south of MD 7C's eastern terminus at US 40 and MD 279 west of Elkton. The route was designated in 2016.

== See also ==
- Maryland Route 144, a similar route for many sections of the old alignments of US 40 between Cumberland and Baltimore
