= St. Patrick's Day beating =

2012 attack in Maryland, U.S.

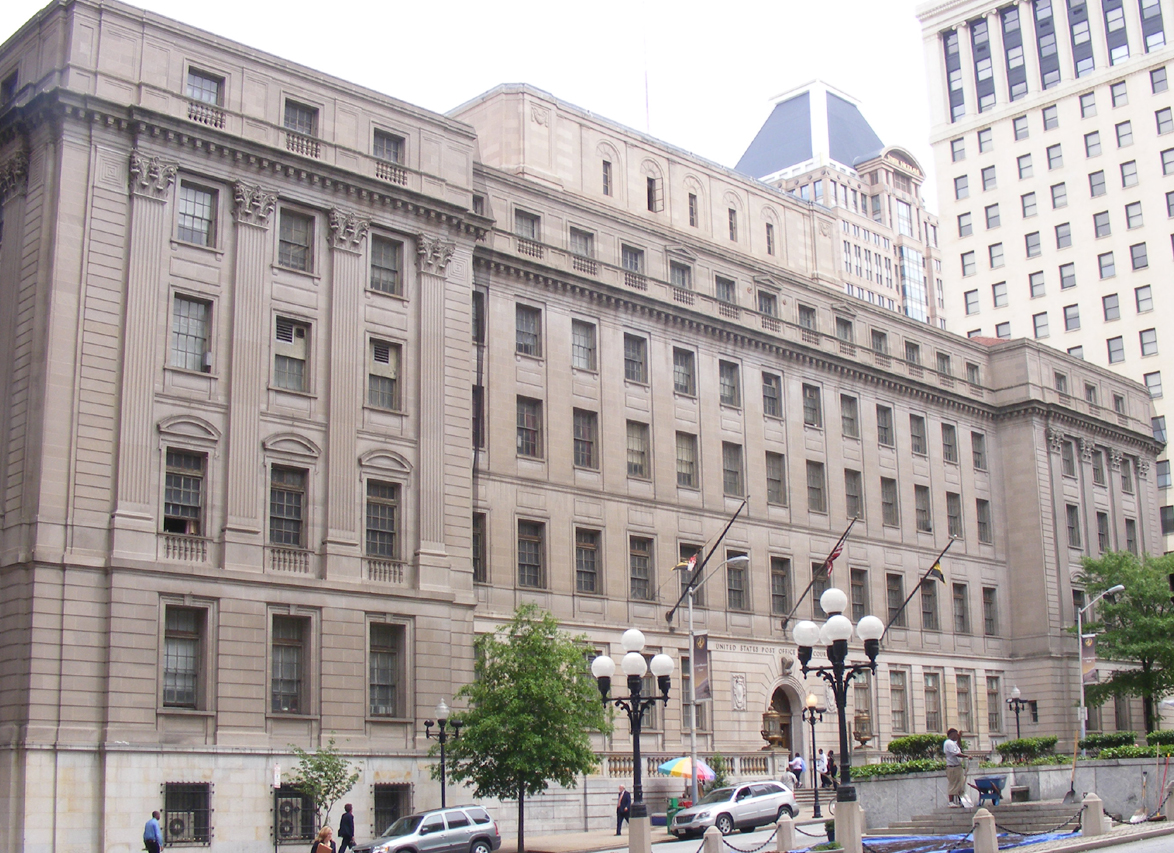
Courthouse East, the site of the attack.

A tourist in Downtown Baltimore, Maryland was beaten, robbed, and stripped by several assailants on March 18, 2012, the day after Saint Patrick's Day and the celebrations that occurred. The video was posted online and went viral, and a negative internet response resulted. Four suspects were arrested and charged with acts related to the crime; all pleaded guilty and were sentenced by the criminal justice system.

== The attack ==
On March 18, 2012, the day after St. Patrick's Day celebrations, a crowd gathered around a tourist in Downtown Baltimore, Maryland, United States. The crowd beat, robbed, and stripped the tourist of his clothes. The victim, a 31-year-old man from Alexandria, Virginia, said in statements to the police that he was traveling from Power Plant Live to a hotel in Mount Vernon. The victim had already consumed alcohol, and he had been intoxicated at the time of the attack.

The attack occurred around 2 AM, outside of the Clarence M. Mitchell, Jr. Courthouse (Courthouse East). The victim lost the keys to his Audi car, his iPhone, and his TAG Heuer watch. The victim had valued the watch at $1,300. He woke up with injuries, and had no recollection of what had occurred.

Several other acts of violence had been occurring in the Inner Harbor area during the same evening.

== Video posting and internet response ==
Videos of the beating were widely shared after they were uploaded to social media sites and shock sites. The videos were posted to several high traffic websites, including 4chan, Reddit, Worldstar Hip Hop, and YouTube. Katie Rogers of The Washington Post said "No one can be sure of which site had the videos first". Justin Fenton and Peter Hermann of The Baltimore Sun stated that "it made it to the now typical stops for such shock clips: Worldstarhiphop, LiveLeak, YouTube, Twitter." The video was uploaded to WorldStar on March 30, 2012. The victim was unaware of the presence of the video until a relative notified him. Over 500,000 people watched the video showing the victim receiving a punch to the face.

As a result of the release of the video of the beating, various users on social media used tools to identify and track down the assailants. Anthony Mandich, a man from Orange County, California, posted blog entries with information about the incident. On one night, users of 4chan worked for hours to try to find the suspects. Facebook and Twitter posters also examined Internet postings in order to track suspects.

== Legal aftermath ==
On April 13, 2012, the first suspect, Aaron Jacob Parsons, a 20-year-old man from Rosedale, Maryland, was arrested after he turned himself in. Parsons worked as a party promoter and had graduated from Our Lady of Mount Carmel High School in Baltimore County. Prior to the arrest of Parsons, WBFF (Fox 45 Baltimore) interviewed him without notifying the Baltimore Police Department. As a result, the department ended the station's relationship with the department in regards to the program "Fugitive Files."

Three other suspects were also arrested. They were 20-year-old Shayona Mikia Davis of northwest Baltimore, 18-year-old Deangelo Carter of Baltimore, and 21-year-old Shatia Baldwin of Baltimore.

Davis was charged with armed robbery since she used her shoe to hit the victim. After Mandich learned that Parsons was arrested, Mandich said that "I actually take no pleasure in his arrest".

By May 10, 2012, the state government dropped 13 of the 24 total criminal charges filed against the defendants. On July 9, 2012, the suspects pleaded guilty, with Parsons and Baldwin doing so to robbery and Carter and Davis to second degree assault. Parsons received a three-year jail sentence, with two of these years being suspended. Carter and Davis were sentenced to one year each, including time served. Baldwin's sentencing was scheduled to occur on December 7, 2012. Baldwin received three years in prison. Warren Brown, the defense attorney, said that Parsons "offered an apology to both the victim and the city, interestingly because he knows he brought disrepute to the city, considering this went viral and cast a negative image of the city."

Carter was incarcerated in the Maryland Reception, Diagnostic and Classification Center; he is no longer incarcerated. Parsons was incarcerated in the Baltimore City Detention Center. He is no longer incarcerated. Baldwin was incarcerated in the Baltimore City Detention Center. She is no longer incarcerated.

== See also ==
- Beating of Chrissy Lee Polis

General:

- Crime in Baltimore
