= Charlestown, Maryland =

- Town
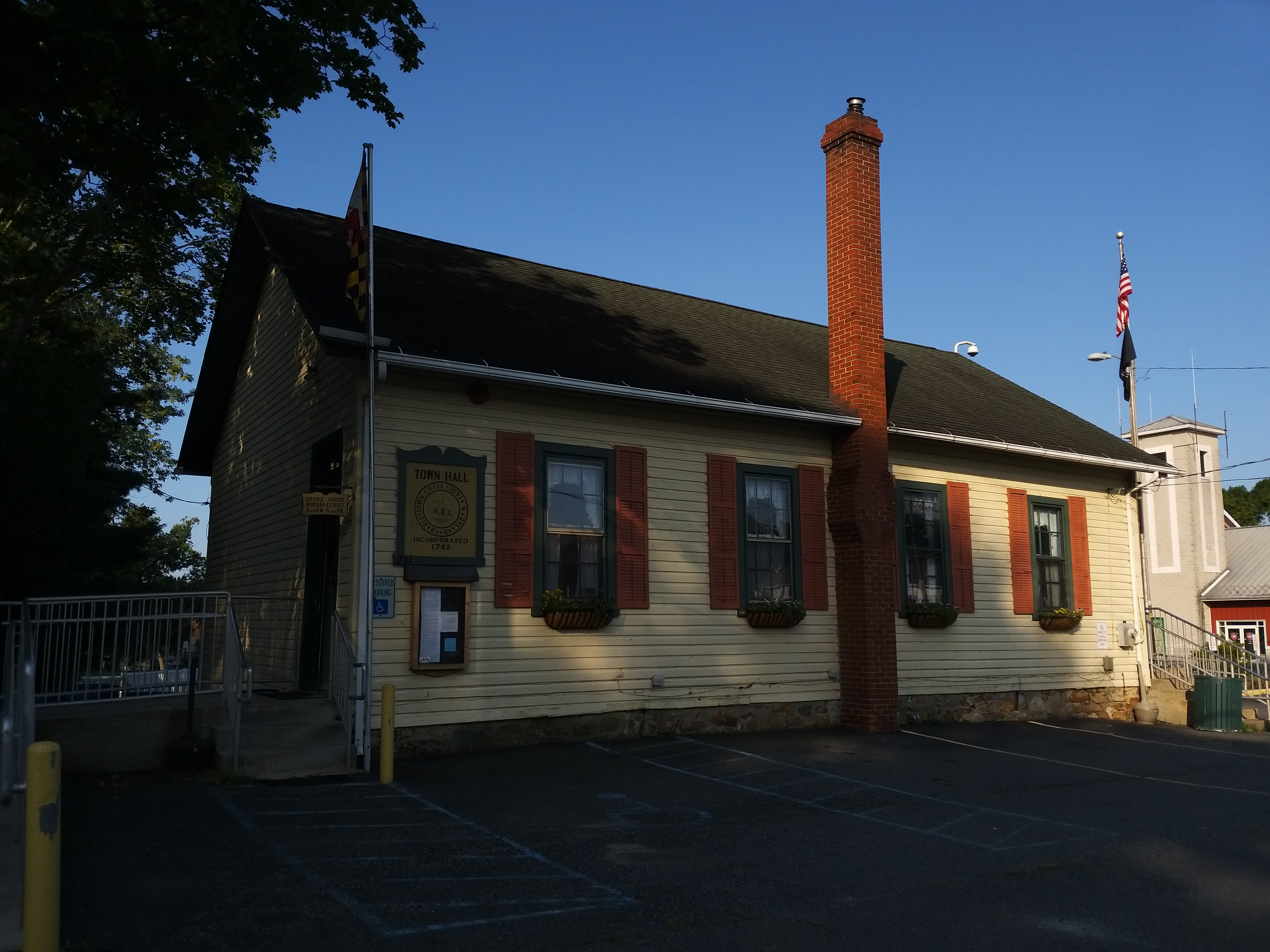
- Town hall and post office

- Flag Seal

- Location of Charlestown, Maryland
- Coordinates: 39°34′36″N 75°58′40″W
- Country: United States
- State: Maryland
- County: Cecil
- Incorporated: 1742

Government
  - President: Joseph Letts

Area
  - Total: 1.17 sq mi (3.03 km^{2})
  - Land: 1.17 sq mi (3.03 km^{2})
  - Water: 0.0039 sq mi (0.01 km^{2})
- Elevation: 36 ft (11 m)

Population (2020)
  - Total: 1,496
  - Density: 1,280.0/sq mi (494.22/km^{2})
- Time zone: UTC-5 (Eastern (EST))
  - Summer (DST): UTC-4 (EDT)
- ZIP code: 21914
- Area code: 410
- FIPS code: 24-15400
- GNIS feature ID: 0589939
- Website: www.charlestownmd.org

Charlestown is a town in Cecil County, Maryland, United States. As of the 2020 census, Charlestown had a population of 1,496.

== History ==
Charlestown is the location of Charlestown Historic District and Indian Queen Tavern and Black's Store, both listed on the National Register of Historic Places in 1975.

== Geography ==
Charlestown is located at 39°34′36″N 75°58′40″W (39.576617, -75.977888).

According to the United States Census Bureau, the town has a total area of 1.51 square miles (3.91 km^{2}), of which, 1.19 square miles (3.08 km^{2}) is land and 0.32 square miles (0.83 km^{2}) is water.

== Transportation ==
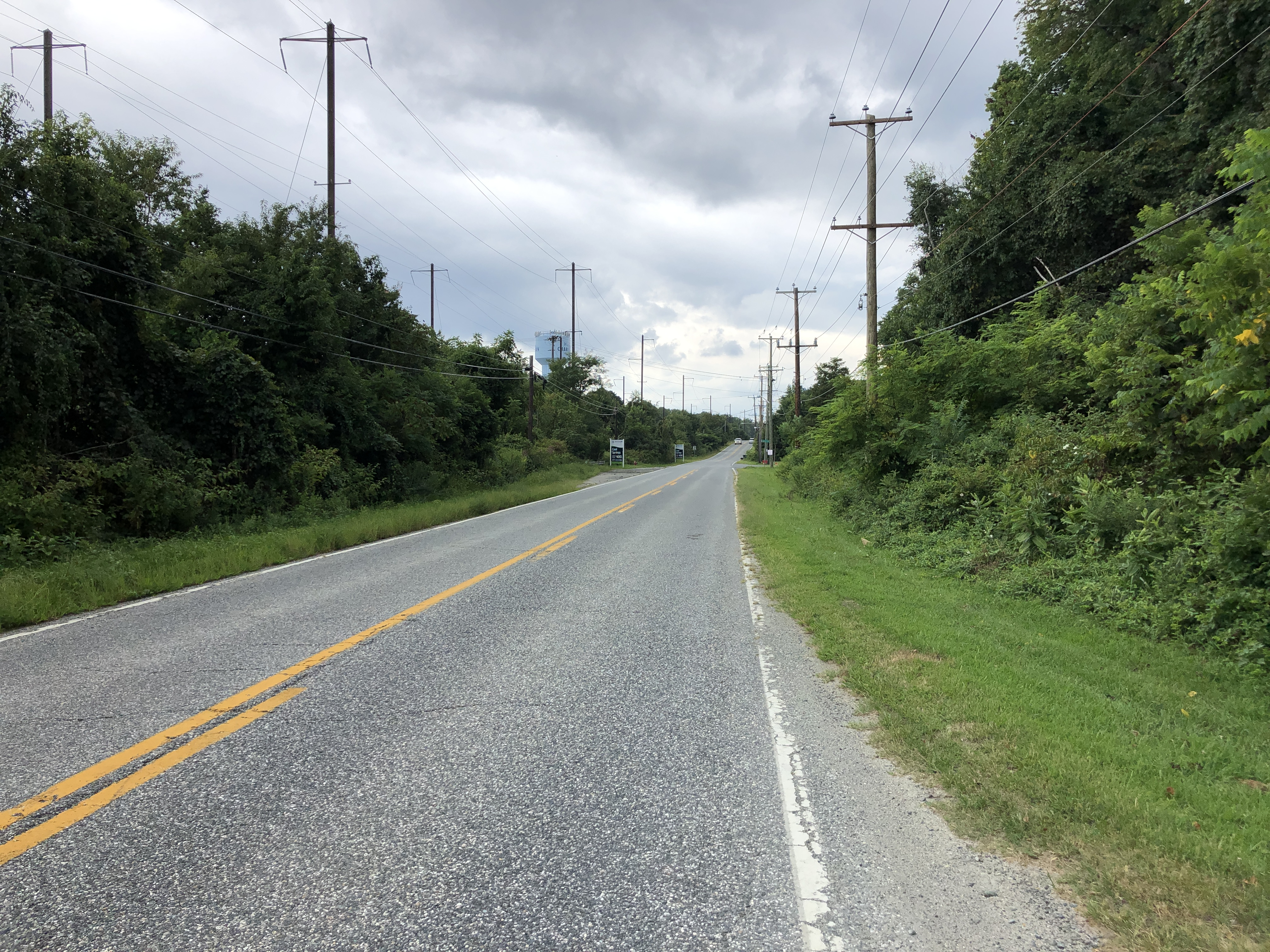
MD 7 westbound in Charlestown

The main method of transportation to and from Charlestown is by road. Maryland Route 7 is the most prominent highway serving Charlestown, following Old Philadelphia Road along the north edge of town. MD 7 heads east and west, linking with U.S. Route 40 and passing through the nearby town of North East. MD 7 also connects with Maryland Route 272, which provides access to the nearest Interstate highway, Interstate 95. Maryland Route 267 also serves Charlestown, passing through the center of town on an old alignment of MD 7.

== Demographics ==
Historical population
Census	Pop.	Note	%±
1870	223		—
1880	211		−5.4%
1890	228		8.1%
1900	244		7.0%
1910	274		12.3%
1920	177		−35.4%
1930	286		61.6%
1940	307		7.3%
1950	551		79.5%
1960	711		29.0%
1970	721		1.4%
1980	720		−0.1%
1990	578		−19.7%
2000	1,019		76.3%
2010	1,183		16.1%
2020	1,496		26.5%
U.S. Decennial Census

=== 2010 census ===
As of the census of 2010, there were 1,183 people, 454 households, and 324 families living in the town. The population density was 994.1 inhabitants per square mile (383.8/km^{2}). There were 550 housing units at an average density of 462.2 per square mile (178.5/km^{2}). The racial makeup of the town was 94.8% White, 3.7% African American, 0.2% Native American, 0.1% Asian, 0.2% from other races, and 1.1% from two or more races. Hispanic or Latino of any race were 2.5% of the population.

There were 454 households, of which 31.9% had children under the age of 18 living with them, 54.8% were married couples living together, 9.0% had a female householder with no husband present, 7.5% had a male householder with no wife present, and 28.6% were non-families. 23.3% of all households were made up of individuals, and 7.9% had someone living alone who was 65 years of age or older. The average household size was 2.60 and the average family size was 3.05.

The median age in the town was 41.4 years. 22.5% of residents were under the age of 18; 7.5% were between the ages of 18 and 24; 26.1% were from 25 to 44; 32.9% were from 45 to 64; and 11% were 65 years of age or older. The gender makeup of the town was 50.3% male and 49.7% female.

=== 2000 census ===
As of the census of 2000, there were 1,019 people, 386 households, and 282 families living in the town. The population density was 1,124.8 inhabitants per square mile (434.3/km^{2}). There were 451 housing units at an average density of 497.8 per square mile (192.2/km^{2}). The racial makeup of the town was 97.94% White, 1.77% African American, 0.10% Native American, and 0.20% from two or more races. Hispanic or Latino of any race were 0.29% of the population.

In 2000, 26.7% of Charlestown residents identified as being of Irish American heritage. This was the highest percentage of Irish Americans of any place in Maryland.

There were 386 households, out of which 35.8% had children under the age of 18 living with them, 58.8% were married couples living together, 9.1% had a female householder with no husband present, and 26.7% were non-families. 17.6% of all households were made up of individuals, and 7.3% had someone living alone who was 65 years of age or older. The average household size was 2.64 and the average family size was 3.03.

In the town, the population was spread out, with 26.8% under the age of 18, 5.9% from 18 to 24, 34.6% from 25 to 44, 22.3% from 45 to 64, and 10.4% who were 65 years of age or older. The median age was 36 years. For every 100 females, there were 110.5 males. For every 100 females age 18 and over, there were 107.2 males.

The median income for a household in the town was $50,563, and the median income for a family was $57,644. Males had a median income of $40,104 versus $25,978 for females. The per capita income for the town was $20,959. About 3.2% of families and 5.1% of the population were below the poverty line, including 6.5% of those under age 18 and 4.7% of those age 65 or over.

== Education ==
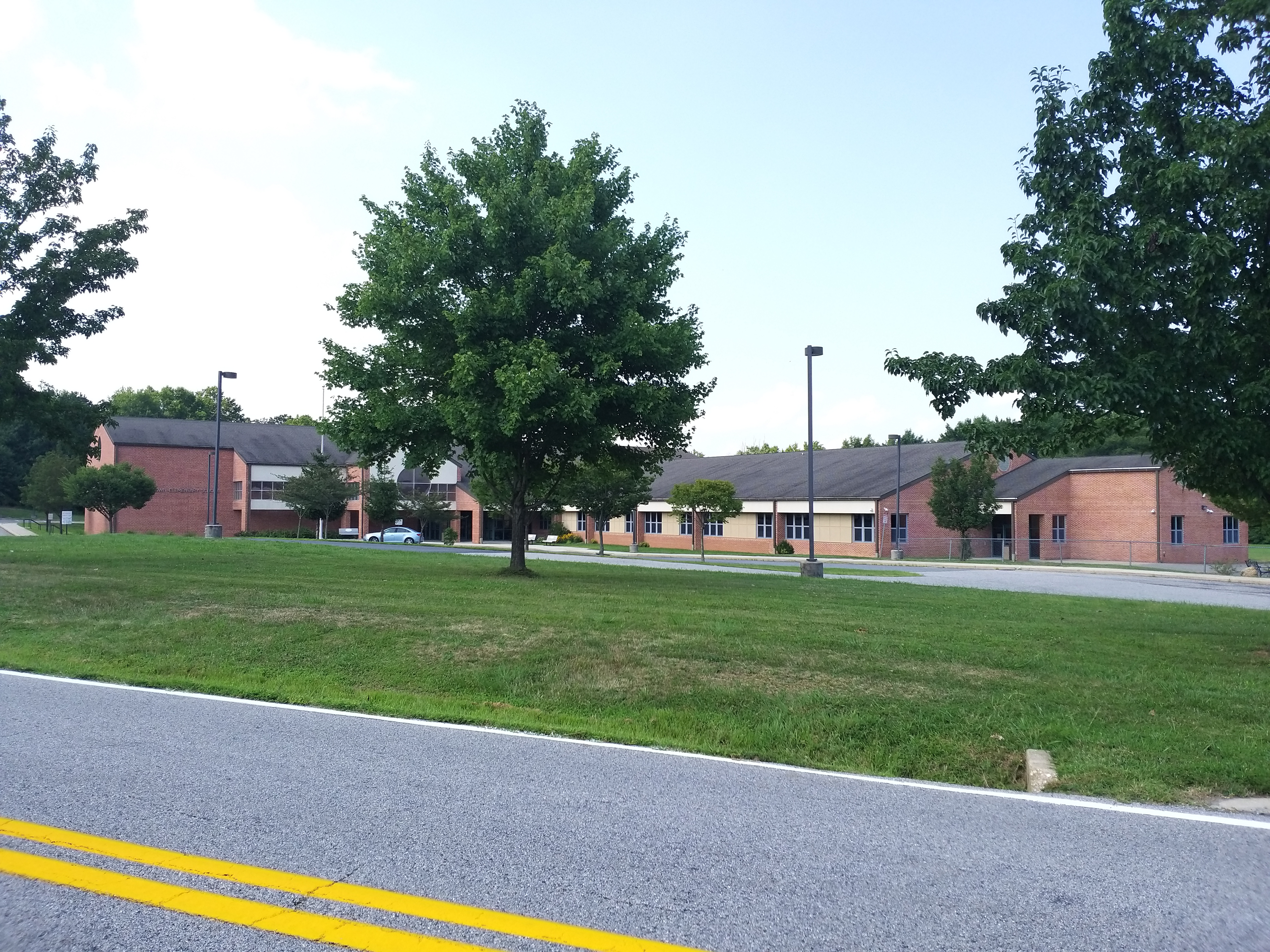
Charlestown Elementary School

Charlestown is within Cecil County Public Schools. Zoned public schools include Charlestown Elementary School, Perryville Middle School, and Perryville High School.

== Gallery ==
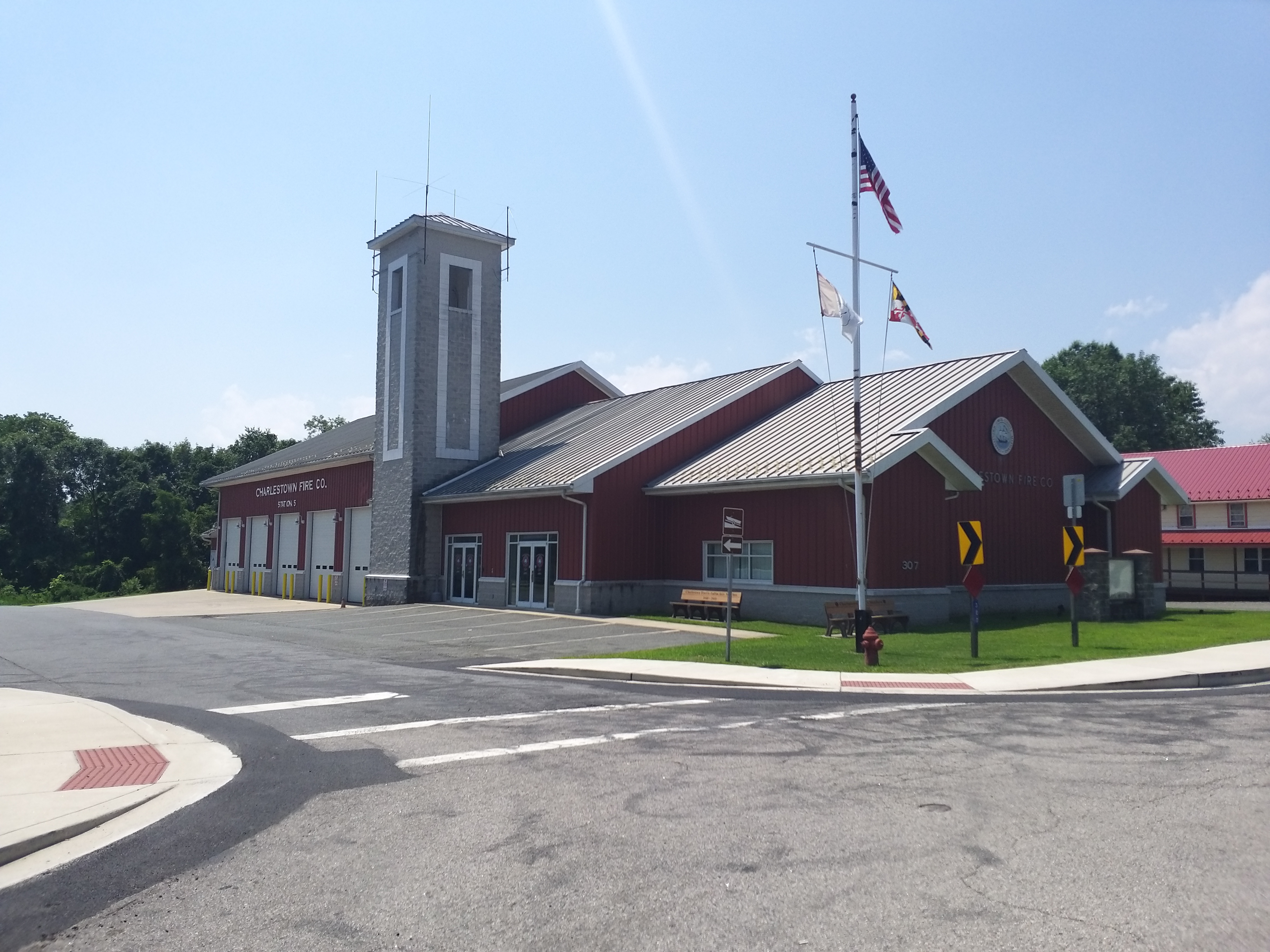
Fire station

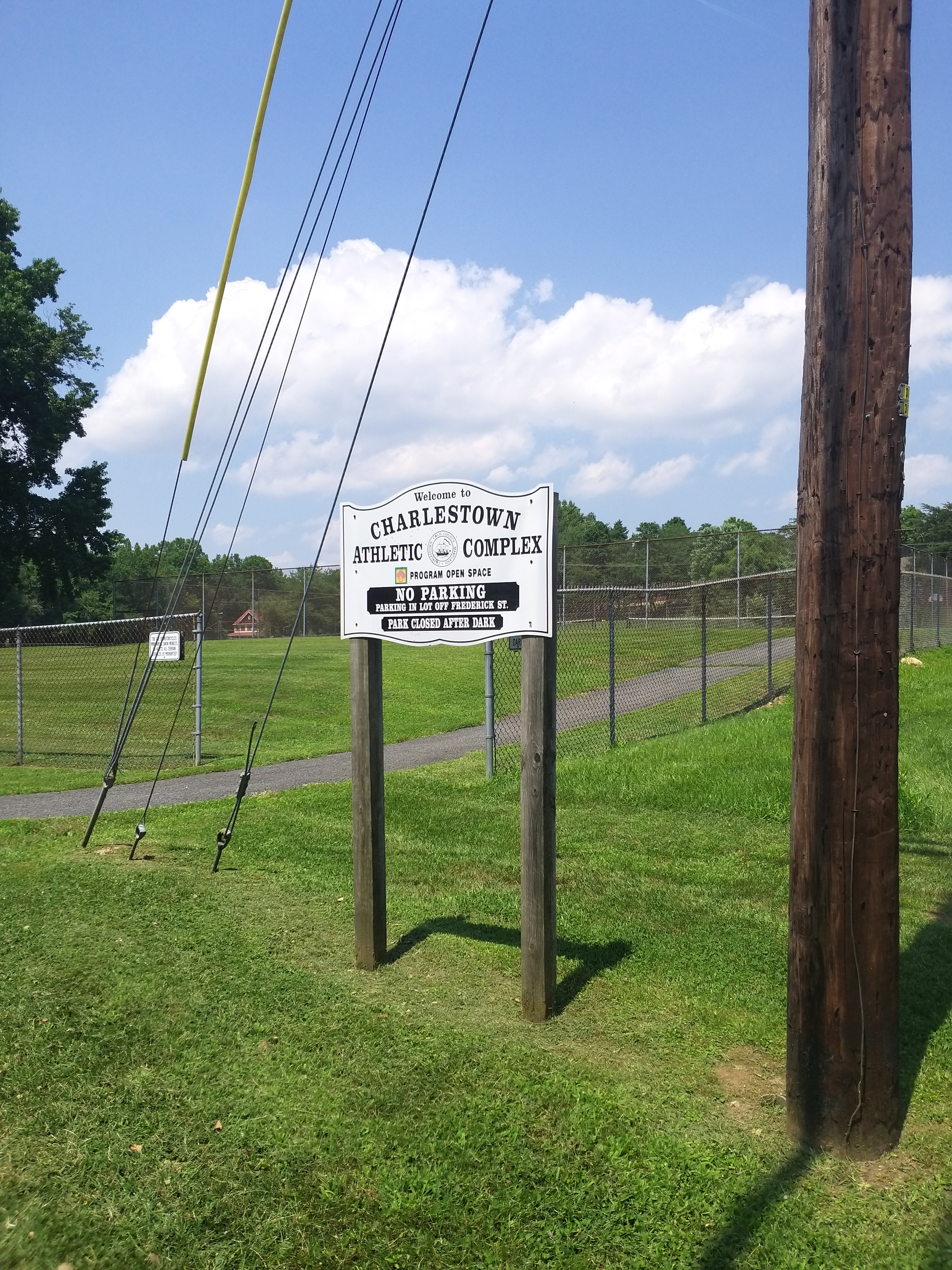
Athletic complex
