= Overlea, Baltimore =

Coordinates: 39°21′47″N 76°31′13″W

Overlea
- Neighborhood of Baltimore
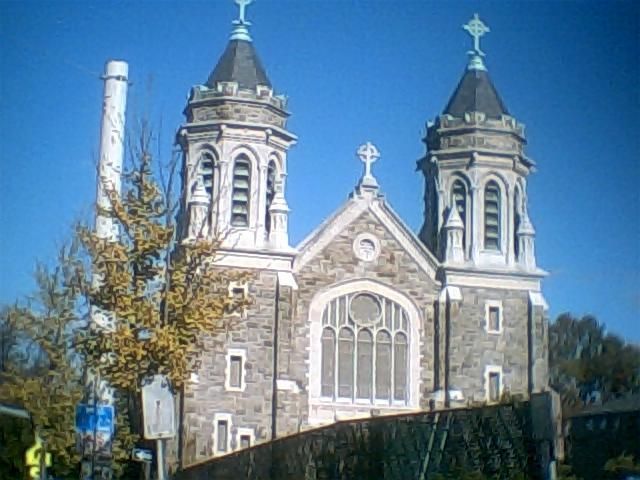
- St. Michael's Church in Overlea

- Location within Baltimore Location within Maryland Location within the United States
- Country: United States
- State: Maryland
- City: Baltimore
- Time zone: UTC−5 (Eastern)
  - Summer (DST): UTC−4 (EDT)
- Area Codes: 410, 443, 667

Overlea is a neighborhood in northeast Baltimore. It is home to the Maryland School for the Blind.

== History ==
In 1919, part of the community of Overlea in Baltimore County was annexed by the city of Baltimore.
