= Beating of Chrissy Lee Polis =

2011 hate crime in Maryland, U.S.

- Location: 39.338778°N 76.505543°W; Rosedale, Maryland, U.S.
- Date: April 18, 2011; 15 years ago c. 8:00 p.m. EDT (UTC-05:00)
- Attack type: Beating, hate crime, violence against LGBT people
- Victim: Chrissy Lee Polis
- Perpetrators: Teonna Monae Brown and unnamed 14-year-old girl
- Motive: Transphobia
- Verdict: Pleaded guilty
- Convictions: First-degree assault, hate crime
- Sentence: Brown: 5 years in prison, plus 5-year suspended sentence 14-year-old: Indefinite sentence in juvenile detention; mandatory release at age 21

Chrissy Lee Polis is a transgender woman who was beaten in an anti-transgender motivated hate crime on April 18, 2011, at a McDonald's in Rosedale, Maryland, just northeast of the city limits of Baltimore. A video of the beating was posted online and went viral. The attack had been conducted by two teenage females, aged 14 and 19. They were both prosecuted. The case heightened awareness of violence against transgender people in Maryland and protests were conducted.

A state law that had protections for transgender people failed to pass shortly before the attack. Gov. Martin O'Malley said he intended to work with the legislature on a bill to provide more protections for transgender people. In addition, Howard County passed a county law protecting transgender people within its boundaries.

== The incident ==
Shortly before 8 p.m. on April 18, 2011, two teenagers beat a transgender woman at a McDonald's in Rosedale, an unincorporated community in Baltimore County, Maryland, in Greater Baltimore. The McDonald's, located at the 6300 block of Kenwood Avenue, (39.338778°N 76.505543°W) was in proximity to the Golden Ring Mall.

The victim, Chrissy Lee Polis, was 22 at the time of the attack. Polis, then a resident of Baltimore, said that she was going to use a restroom, when a female individual spat in her face. Then she and another female person started attacking Polis. One of the attackers was 14 years old. A McDonald's employee, Vernon Hackett, filmed the beating and the attempts of another employee and a customer to intervene in the attack. Other McDonald's employees in the video are heard laughing. Hackett was fired on April 23, after making transphobic remarks about Polis on Facebook.

The beating lasted for several minutes. Weijia Jiang of CBS Baltimore said, "Then after a powerful blow to the head, the victim appears to have a violent seizure, and as she bleeds from the mouth, spectators warn the attackers to flee before cops arrive." Polis said that she had been intoxicated during the attack, and that she had a seizure. She received cuts to the face and mouth. Polis stated that she believed that being transgender was to blame for the assault.

== The video ==
The three-minute video of the incident was posted online and became popular. Justin Fenton of The Baltimore Sun said that the video was "apparently" first posted on YouTube but was later taken down. The same video later was posted to other websites, including WorldStar HipHop. On one website, the video received over 500,000 views by the early evening of April 22, 2012.

The Drudge Report linked to the video and gave it a prominent status for much of the day it was posted. Fenton said "The video received widespread attention part because of the racial dynamics of the attack – the attackers were black, and the victim is white." McDonald's issued a statement, saying that it fired the employee who had taped the incident.

== Criminal charges and sentences ==
After the attack, a pro-transgender advocacy group, Equality Maryland, asked the county officials to consider investigating the case to determine if it was a hate crime. Scott D. Shellenberger, an attorney for the state of Maryland, said that hate crime charges may result from the attack; at the time he was not aware of the gender identity of the victim.

On July 1, 2011, the 14-year-old admitted responsibility in the juvenile criminal system. The other attacker, 19-year-old Teonna Monae Brown, pleaded guilty to her role in the attack on Thursday August 4, 2011, in the Baltimore County Circuit Court. Brown pleaded guilty to one count of first-degree assault and one count of a hate crime.

Prosecutors sought to give Brown a 10-year sentence, with 5 of those years suspended. The maximum possible sentence for all of the crimes committed would have been 35 years. Brown was given the sentence sought by prosecutors. Some advocates for transgender people argued that the sentence was not severe enough.

== Aftermath ==
David Zurawick of The Baltimore Sun said that the posting of the video publicized "the vulnerability and lack of protection for transgendered citizens in Baltimore".

The week after the attack, hundreds of people started a protest against the incident. Some organizations representing transgender people stated that they wished to use the incident to highlight violence against transgender people. Shortly before the beating had occurred, a proposed Maryland law that would have added protections for transgender people failed to pass the legislature. The modified version that was passed did not have these protections.

By November 2011 a bill to add protections for transgender people began circulating in the government of Howard County, Maryland. On Monday, December 5, 2011, Howard County passed the protections for transgender people into county law.

== See also ==
- 2012 St. Patrick's Day beating
