= Charlestown Historic District =

Historic district in Maryland, United States

- U.S. National Register of Historic Places
- U.S. Historic district
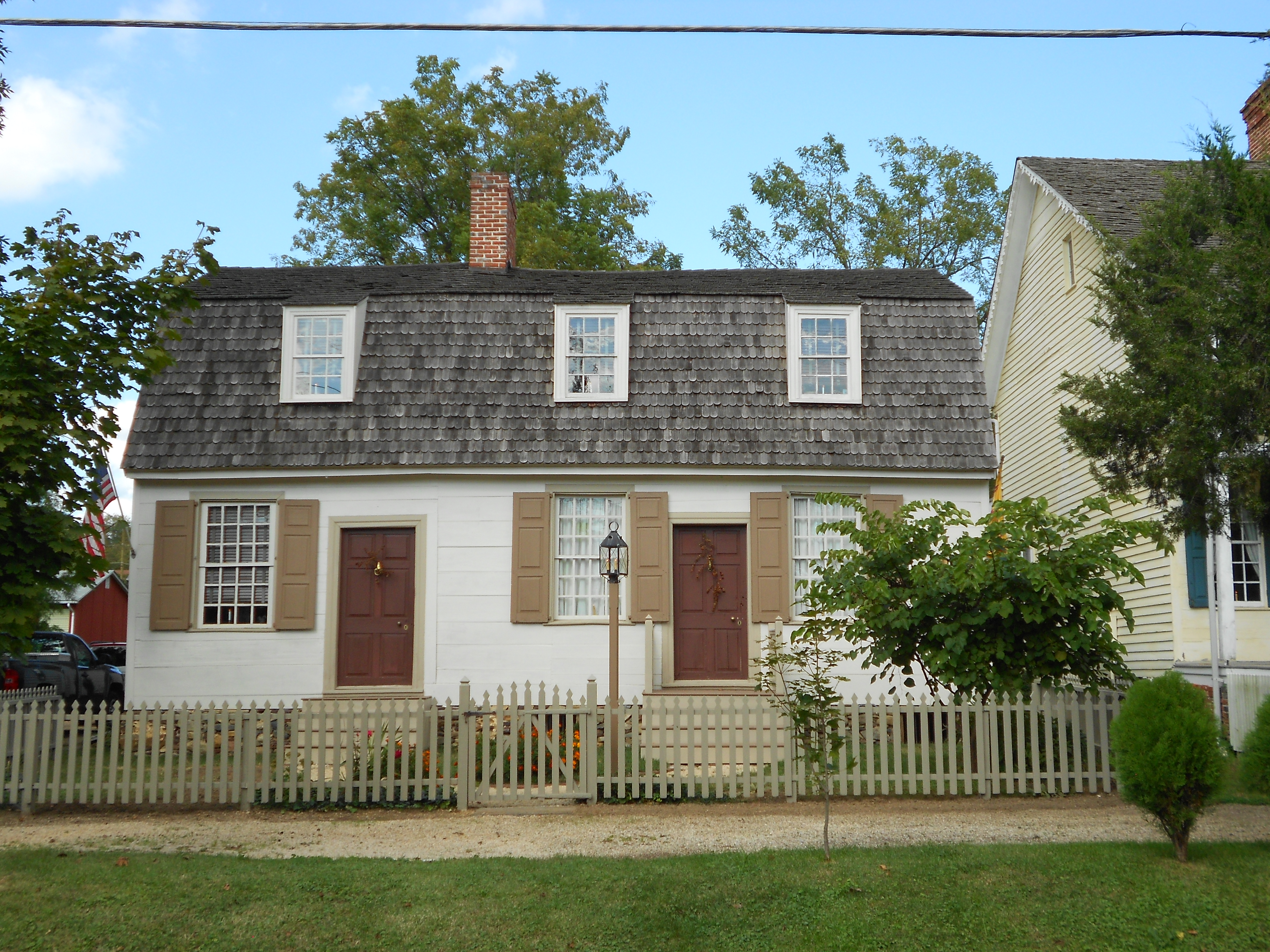
- The historic Red Lion Inn in Charlestown

- Location within Maryland Location within the United States
- Location: Bounded by Tasker and Ogle Sts., Louisa Lane, and the North East River, Charlestown, Maryland
- Coordinates: 39°34′26″N 75°58′32″W
- Area: 49.2 acres (19.9 ha)
- Architectural style: Late Victorian, Georgian
- NRHP reference No.: 75000880
- Added to NRHP: April 14, 1975

Charlestown Historic District is a national historic district at Charlestown, Cecil County, Maryland, United States. It consists of a 150-acre (0.61 km^{2}) portion of the town containing all known existing 18th century features. There are 14 houses known to have been constructed during that century and its largest structures were the inns and hotels which served the popular Charlestown Fair in the colonial period.

It was added to the National Register of Historic Places in 1975.
