= Maryland Route 588 =

State highway in Maryland, United States

Maryland Route 588
- Maryland Route 588 highlighted in red

Route information
- Maintained by MDSHA
- Length: 1.94 mi (3.12 km)
- Existed: 1935–present

Major junctions
- South end: MD 7 in Rosedale
- North end: End of state maintenance in Overlea

Location
- Country: United States
- State: Maryland
- Counties: Baltimore

Highway system
- Maryland highway system; Interstate; US; State; Scenic Byways
← MD 587	→ MD 589

Maryland Route 588 (MD 588) is a state highway in the U.S. state of Maryland. The state highway runs 1.94 miles (3.12 km) from MD 7 in Rosedale north to the end of state maintenance in Overlea. MD 588 was constructed in the mid-1930s.

== Route description ==
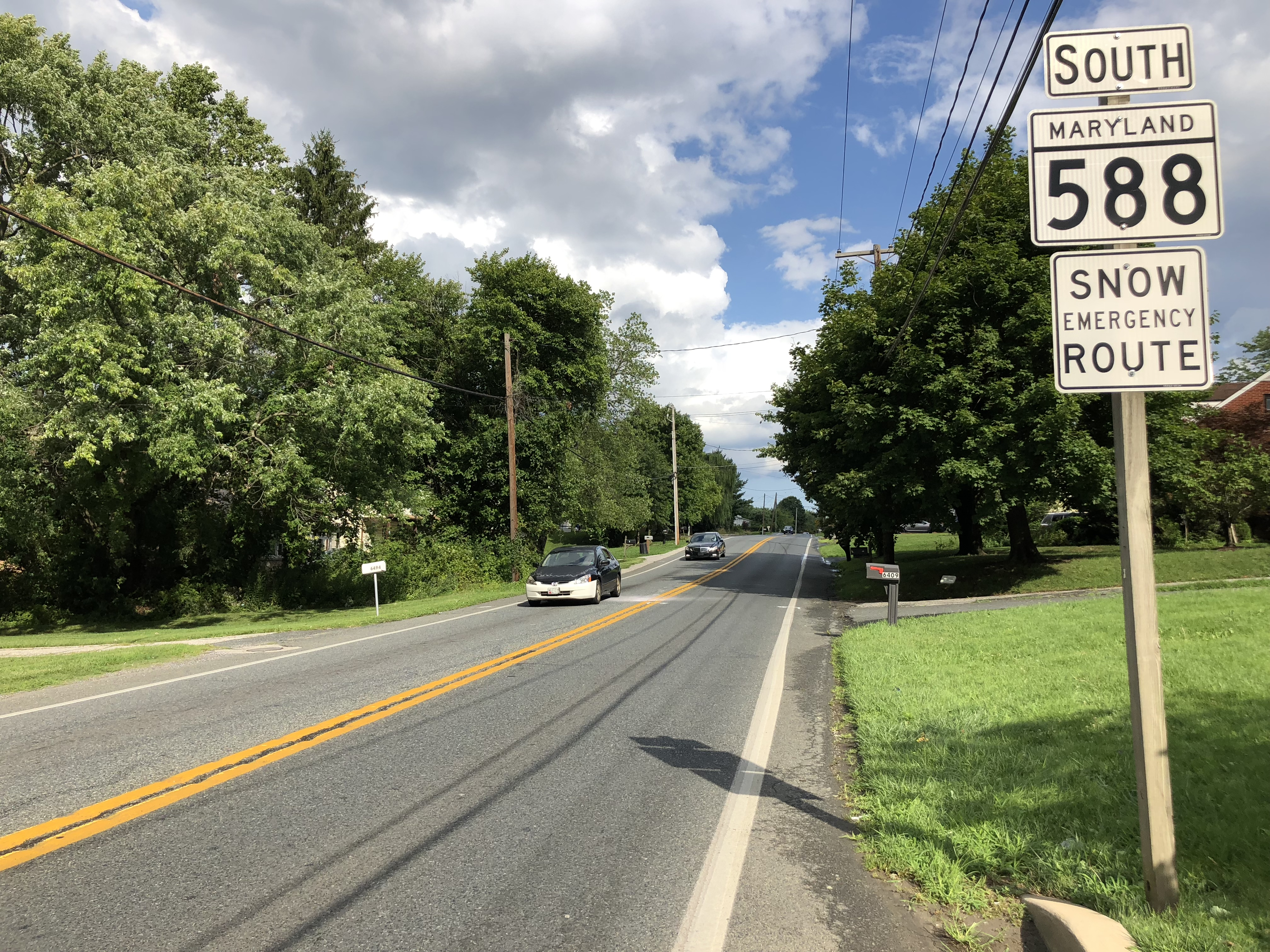
View south along MD 588 in Rosedale

MD 588 begins at an intersection with MD 7 (Philadelphia Road) just west of Interstate 695 (I-695) (Baltimore Beltway) in Rosedale. Golden Ring Road continues south as a county highway toward U.S. Route 40 on the south side of the intersection. MD 588 heads north as a two-lane undivided road through residential subdivisions. At Kenwood Avenue, MD 588 leaves Golden Ring Road and continues north on Kenwood Avenue. The state highway passes through a commercial area before crossing I-95 with no access. MD 588 continues north through a residential area of Overlea, passing Overlea High School before reaching its northern terminus just beyond the intersection with Brookwood Avenue.

== History ==
MD 588 was brought into the state highway system when the existing county highway was widened with concrete shoulders and resurfaced with macadam in 1935. The state highway has changed little since then.

== Junction list ==
The entire route is in Baltimore County.

Location	mi	km	Destinations	Notes
Rosedale	0.00	0.00	MD 7 (Philadelphia Road) to I-695 / Golden Ring Road south	Southern terminus
Rosedale	0.58	0.93	Golden Ring Road north / Kenwood Road south	MD 588 turns north onto Kenwood Road
Overlea	1.94	3.12	Kenwood Road north	Northern terminus; end of state maintenance
1.000 mi = 1.609 km; 1.000 km = 0.621 mi
