= Indian Queen Tavern and Black's Store =

- U.S. National Register of Historic Places
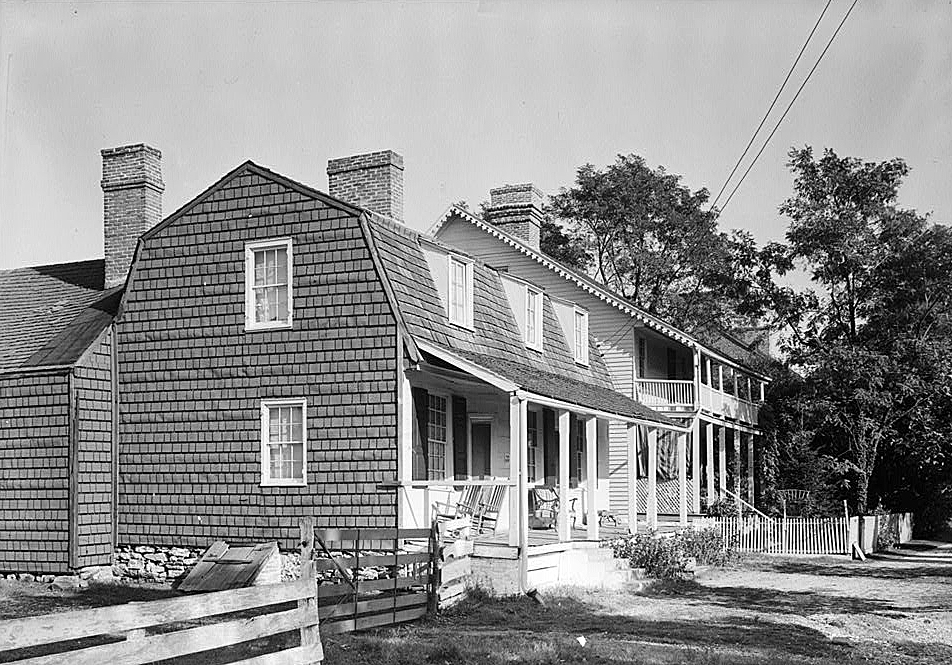
- Indian Queen Tavern in 1936

- Location within Maryland Location within the United States
- Location: Market St. between Bladen and Cecil Sts., Charlestown, Maryland
- Coordinates: 39°34′27″N 75°58′39″W
- Area: less than one acre
- Built: 1755
- NRHP reference No.: 75000881
- Added to NRHP: February 20, 1975

Indian Queen Tavern and Black's Store is a historic hotel and store complex located at Charlestown, Cecil County, Maryland, US. It consists of two mid-18th-century structures: Black's Store, originally the Red Lyon Inn, and the Indian Queen Tavern, later called Hotel. The two taverns and their remaining outbuildings form a court. The outbuildings include a log kitchen with a loft and a two-story smokehouse.

It was listed on the National Register of Historic Places in 1975.
