= Overlea, Maryland =

- Census-designated place
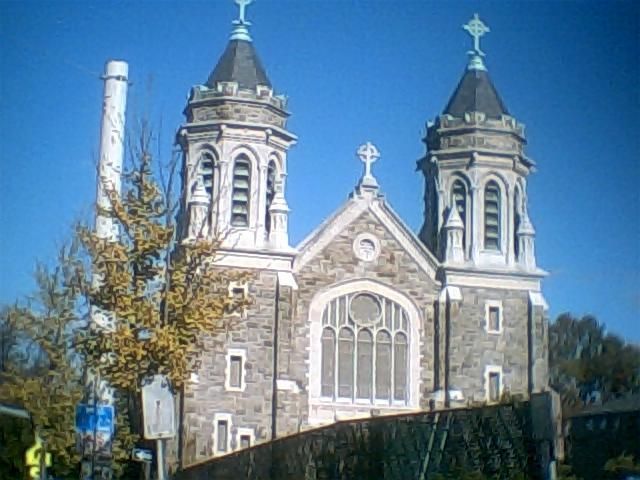
- St. Michael's Church, in October 2010.

- right
- Coordinates: 39°21′40″N 76°31′10″W
- Country: United States
- State: Maryland
- County: Baltimore

Area
  - Total: 3.02 sq mi (7.81 km^{2})
  - Land: 3.02 sq mi (7.81 km^{2})
  - Water: 0 sq mi (0.00 km^{2})
- Elevation: 226 ft (69 m)

Population (2020)
  - Total: 12,832
  - Density: 4,255.2/sq mi (1,642.93/km^{2})
- Time zone: UTC−5 (Eastern (EST))
  - Summer (DST): UTC−4 (EDT)
- FIPS code: 24-59325
- GNIS feature ID: 0590957

Overlea /ˈoʊvərˌliː/ is an unincorporated community and census-designated place in Baltimore County, Maryland, United States. The population was 12,275 at the 2010 census. Students attend Overlea High School. Area roads include Belair Road (U.S. Route 1) and Kenwood Avenue (Maryland Route 588).

Overlea includes the neighborhood of Fullerton.

== Geography ==
Overlea is located at 39°21′40″N 76°31′10″W (39.361107, −76.519535).

According to the United States Census Bureau, the CDP has a total area of 3.1 square miles (8.0 km^{2}), all land.

== History ==
Overlea first started out as a 43-acre tract, owned by Margaret Fuller (Fullerton, Maryland, is named for her most likely). This tract started in 1858, just three years before the start of the American Civil War. She was a widow and brought her six children with her. Margaret Fuller originally hailed from Ohio. The 43-acre tract was referred to as "Sophie’s Garden Regulated". This original tract is located around the intersection of Belair Road and Taylor Avenue, along with the original house still standing there today. In 1885, the first Post office and general store were established. Later in 1886, Fullerton School was established as a one roomed log house, and was rebuilt as a frame house. Overlea began to truly develop in 1895 when the Kennard Land Company bought Lange's Farm (either Fuller's original tract, or a different tract, or possibly both). Kennard Land company mapped out the streets as: Spruce, Ash, Cedar, Maple, Hickory, Chestnut, Walnut, Willow, Beech, Poplar, Elm and Linden. Streets were named after trees. In 1910, a "town hall" was built on the Corner of Overlea Avenue and Belair Road, and still stands there today as the Natural History Society of Maryland. The town hall served as a grocery store as well. On February 23, 1913, a group of suffragists called "The Army of the Hudson" stopped at the town hall on their way from New York City to the march organized in Washington, D.C., by the National American Woman Suffrage Association. They held a meeting in the town hall, and although many were not sympathetic, a few showed support. In the same year, St. Michael's Roman Catholic Church held its first mass in the town hall. In 1919, The City of Baltimore annexed a portion of Overlea to what is now Overlea, Baltimore.

== Demographics ==
Historical population
Census	Pop.	Note	%±
1960	10,795		—
1970	13,124		21.6%
1980	12,965		−1.2%
1990	12,137		−6.4%
2000	12,148		0.1%
2010	12,275		1.0%
2020	12,832		4.5%
U.S. Decennial Census

=== Racial and ethnic composition ===
Overlea CDP, Maryland – Racial and ethnic composition Note: the US Census treats Hispanic/Latino as an ethnic category. This table excludes Latinos from the racial categories and assigns them to a separate category. Hispanics/Latinos may be of any race.
Race / Ethnicity (NH = Non-Hispanic)	Pop 2000	Pop 2010	Pop 2020	% 2000	% 2010	% 2020
White alone (NH)	10,538	8,941	7,344	86.75%	72.84%	57.23%
Black or African American alone (NH)	1,066	2,307	3,481	8.78%	18.79%	27.13%
Native American or Alaska Native alone (NH)	34	24	41	0.28%	0.20%	0.32%
Asian alone (NH)	212	391	613	1.75%	3.19%	4.78%
Native Hawaiian or Pacific Islander alone (NH)	0	4	3	0.00%	0.03%	0.02%
Other race alone (NH)	7	20	71	0.06%	0.16%	0.55%
Mixed race or Multiracial (NH)	122	209	553	1.00%	1.70%	4.31%
Hispanic or Latino (any race)	169	379	726	1.39%	3.09%	5.66%
Total	12,148	12,275	12,832	100.00%	100.00%	100.00%

=== 2020 census ===
As of the 2020 census, Overlea had a population of 12,832. The median age was 40.1 years. About 21.1% of residents were under the age of 18 and 17.8% were 65 years of age or older. For every 100 females, there were 89.7 males; for every 100 females age 18 and over, there were 86.8 males age 18 and over.

100.0% of residents lived in urban areas, while 0.0% lived in rural areas.

There were 5,171 households in Overlea, of which 30.1% had children under the age of 18 living in them. Of all households, 41.2% were married-couple households, 17.8% were households with a male householder and no spouse or partner present, and 33.5% were households with a female householder and no spouse or partner present. About 29.4% of all households were made up of individuals and 13.5% had someone living alone who was 65 years of age or older.

There were 5,537 housing units, of which 6.6% were vacant. The homeowner vacancy rate was 1.9% and the rental vacancy rate was 9.9%.

=== 2000 census ===
As of the census of 2000, there were 12,148 people, 4,951 households, and 3,317 families residing in the CDP. The population density was 3,950.6 inhabitants per square mile (1,525.3/km^{2}). There were 5,152 housing units at an average density of 1,675.4 per square mile (646.9/km^{2}). The racial makeup of the CDP was 87.74% White, 8.78% African American, 0.30% Native American, 1.79% Asian, 0.02% Pacific Islander, 0.23% from other races, and 1.14% from two or more races. Hispanic or Latino of any race were 1.39% of the population.

There were 4,951 households, out of which 28.6% had children under the age of 18 living with them, 51.1% were married couples living together, 11.6% had a female householder with no husband present, and 33.0% were non-families. 26.9% of all households were made up of individuals, and 12.0% had someone living alone who was 65 years of age or older. The average household size was 2.45 and the average family size was 2.99.

In the CDP, the population was spread out, with 22.9% under the age of 18, 7.7% from 18 to 24, 30.8% from 25 to 44, 22.4% from 45 to 64, and 16.2% who were 65 years of age or older. The median age was 38 years. For every 100 females, there were 92.6 males. For every 100 females age 18 and over, there were 89.1 males.

The median income for a household in the CDP was $48,242, and the median income for a family was $57,075. Males had a median income of $40,349 versus $30,167 for females. The per capita income for the CDP was $23,402. About 3.6% of families and 5.2% of the population were below the poverty line, including 5.1% of those under age 18 and 7.7% of those age 65 or over.

== Education ==
Overlea is home to Overlea High School which has a student body of 1,073 students as of the 2010 school year.
