= Rosedale, Maryland =

- Census-designated place
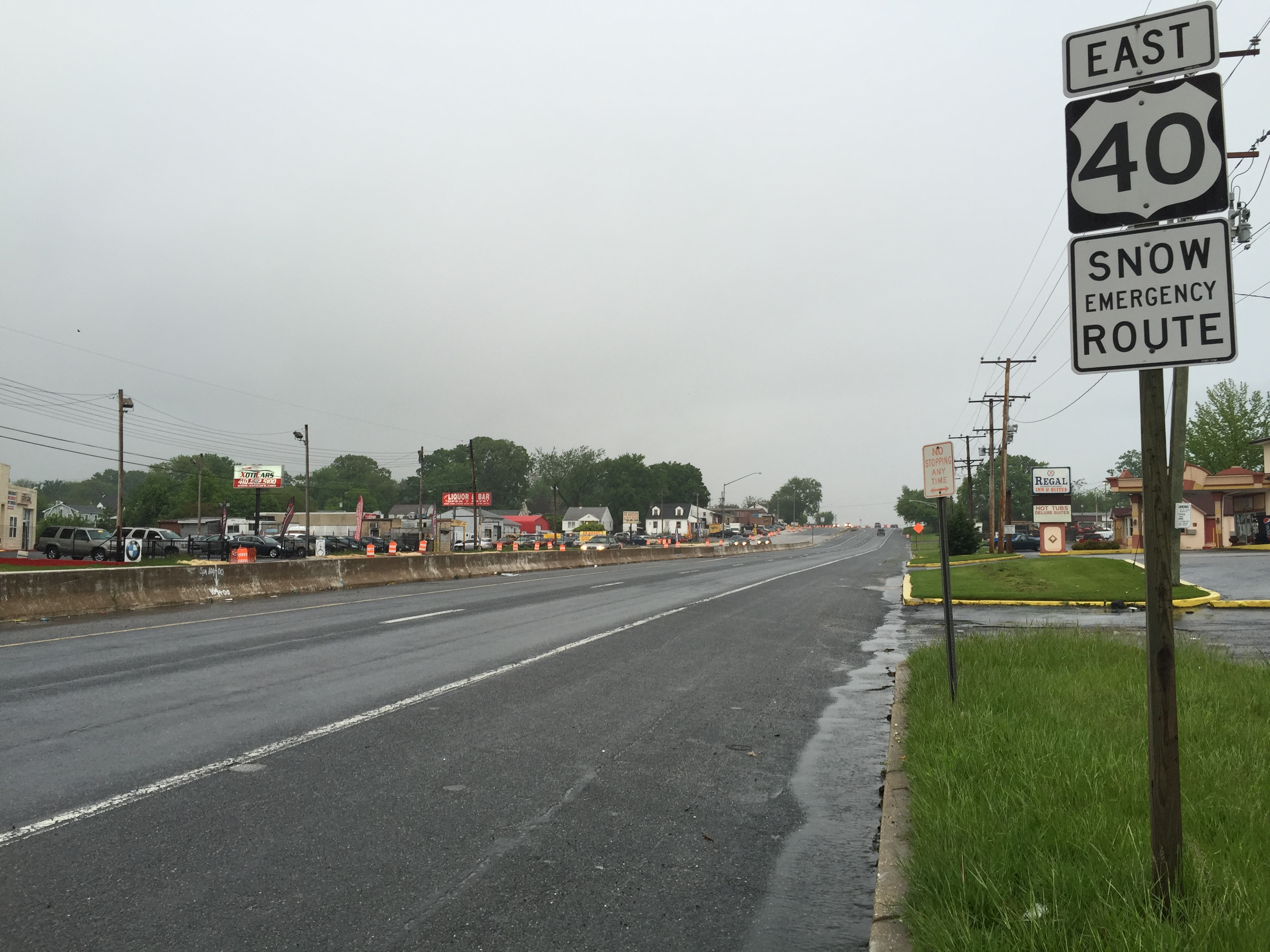
- Pulaski Highway near Chesaco Avenue in Rosedale, Maryland

- Location of Rosedale, Maryland
- Coordinates: 39°19′42″N 76°30′40″W
- Country: United States
- State: Maryland
- County: Baltimore

Area
  - Total: 7.10 sq mi (18.40 km^{2})
  - Land: 6.86 sq mi (17.78 km^{2})
  - Water: 0.24 sq mi (0.62 km^{2})
- Elevation: 20 ft (6 m)

Population (2020)
  - Total: 19,961
  - Density: 2,908.3/sq mi (1,122.92/km^{2})
- Time zone: UTC−5 (Eastern (EST))
  - Summer (DST): UTC−4 (EDT)
- ZIP code: 21237, 21206
- Area code: 410
- FIPS code: 24-68400
- GNIS feature ID: 0591183

Rosedale is an unincorporated community and census-designated place in Baltimore County, Maryland, United States. The population was 19,961 at the 2020 United States census.

== History ==
The etymology of Rosedale remains uncertain and lacks definitive documentation. However, according to anecdotal evidence, a fourth-grade class in 1950 was instructed to conduct interviews with local residents regarding the history of the Rosedale community. From their interviews, a possible explanation emerged: A young Englishman had a farm on Hamilton Avenue just above Philadelphia Road. His farm had numerous roses. Since his name was Dale and the roses were so lovely, the townspeople settled on the name of Rosedale.

Rosedale, a community northeast of the city of Baltimore, was a plantation and later farming community, from the time of the first settlers and their slaves, until suburban development began after World War II. Maryland Route 7, which runs through the community, was originally the Philadelphia Road. George Washington traveled it to New York in 1789 where he was inaugurated as the first American president.

In the latter part of the nineteenth century, this area was settled by new waves of immigrants, mostly from Germany and Poland. A 1940 article was written about the 59th wedding anniversary of Charles Schatzschneider and his wife; they had been immigrants who settled in this area. Charles Schatzschneider was born in Germany in 1859 and came at the age of 13 to the United States as a farm laborer. He settled in Rosedale, where he later married. He and his wife raised 15 children. During their lives they saw the area develop from a rather primitive rural community to one with gas and electric lighting, water and sewerage systems and paved streets. New electric trains passed rapidly through the community. When this couple had first come to the area, great three-masted schooners could sail all the way up Back River to the heading.

On 8 March 1909, an African American man named William Ramsey was lynched in the town. The first school, a wooden building with two rooms, was built on the corner of Hamilton Avenue and Philadelphia Road. By 1950 it was used as a fire house and hall.

Beginning in the 1950s, aided by federal subsidies of new highways, new residential development was built in the suburbs of Baltimore and other major cities. Rosedale grew steadily as a residential suburb. Three quarters of the housing units existing in 1990 were built between 1854 and 1979.

Source: Rosedale Library Mary Bennett (Henry) 3/16/2020

== Education ==
Baltimore County Public Schools operates public schools.

The following public schools serve the Rosedale community:

- Overlea High School
- Rosedale Center
- Golden Ring Middle School
- Red House Run Elementary School
- McCormick Elementary School
- Shady Spring School

Private schools:

- St. Clement Mary Hofbauer Catholic School
- Kingdom Academy
- GLA Academy
- Baltimore White Marsh Seventh-Day Adventist School
- Rosedale Baptist School

== Geography ==
Rosedale is located at 39°19′42″N 76°30′40″W (39.328307, −76.511100).

According to the United States Census Bureau, the CDP has a total area of 7.1 square miles (18 km^{2}), of which 6.9 square miles (18 km^{2}) is land and 0.2 square miles (0.52 km^{2}), or 3.23%, is water.

== Demographics ==
Historical population
Census	Pop.	Note	%±
1970	19,417		—
1980	19,956		2.8%
1990	18,703		−6.3%
2000	19,199		2.7%
2010	19,257		0.3%
2020	19,961		3.7%
U.S. Decennial Census

=== Racial and ethnic composition ===
Rosedale CDP, Maryland – Racial and ethnic composition Note: the US Census treats Hispanic/Latino as an ethnic category. This table excludes Latinos from the racial categories and assigns them to a separate category. Hispanics/Latinos may be of any race.
Race / Ethnicity (NH = Non-Hispanic)	Pop 2000	Pop 2010	Pop 2020	% 2000	% 2010	% 2020
White alone (NH)	14,210	10,978	8,181	74.01%	57.01%	40.98%
Black or African American alone (NH)	4,050	6,288	7,833	21.09%	32.65%	39.24%
Native American or Alaska Native alone (NH)	44	76	60	0.23%	0.39%	0.30%
Asian alone (NH)	366	578	1,296	1.91%	3.00%	6.49%
Native Hawaiian or Pacific Islander alone (NH)	10	10	11	0.05%	0.05%	0.06%
Other race alone (NH)	20	34	94	0.10%	0.18%	0.47%
Mixed race or Multiracial (NH)	233	333	749	1.21%	1.73%	3.75%
Hispanic or Latino (any race)	266	960	1,737	1.39%	4.99%	8.70%
Total	19,199	19,257	19,961	100.00%	100.00%	100.00%

=== 2020 census ===
As of the 2020 census, Rosedale had a population of 19,961. The median age was 40.4 years. 21.1% of residents were under the age of 18 and 17.3% of residents were 65 years of age or older. For every 100 females there were 93.8 males, and for every 100 females age 18 and over there were 89.4 males age 18 and over.

100.0% of residents lived in urban areas, while 0.0% lived in rural areas.

There were 7,348 households in Rosedale, of which 31.1% had children under the age of 18 living in them. Of all households, 42.6% were married-couple households, 18.6% were households with a male householder and no spouse or partner present, and 32.0% were households with a female householder and no spouse or partner present. About 25.5% of all households were made up of individuals and 11.6% had someone living alone who was 65 years of age or older.

There were 7,739 housing units, of which 5.1% were vacant. The homeowner vacancy rate was 1.9% and the rental vacancy rate was 6.3%.

Racial composition as of the 2020 census
Race	Number	Percent
White	8,361	41.9%
Black or African American	7,885	39.5%
American Indian and Alaska Native	117	0.6%
Asian	1,296	6.5%
Native Hawaiian and Other Pacific Islander	12	0.1%
Some other race	1,125	5.6%
Two or more races	1,165	5.8%
Hispanic or Latino (of any race)	1,737	8.7%

=== 2010 census ===
As of the census of 2010, there were 19,257 people, 7,128 households, and 5,047 families living in the CDP. The population density was 2,790.2 inhabitants per square mile (1,077.3/km^{2}). There were 7,606 housing units at an average density of 1,092.6 per square mile (421.9/km^{2}). The racial makeup of the CDP was 59% White, 33% African American, 0.5% Native American, 3% Asian, 0.1% Pacific Islander, 2.5% from other races, and 2.0% from two or more races. Hispanic or Latino of any race were 5.0% of the population.

There were 7,272 households, out of which 27.1% had children under the age of 18 living with them, 16.9% had a female householder with no husband present, and 29.2% were non-families. 21.8% of all households were made up of individuals, and 10.8% had someone living alone who was 65 years of age or older. The average household size was 2.70 and the average family size was 3.17.

The median income for a household in the CDP was $62,534, and the median income for a family was $74,212. Males had a median income of $51,922 versus $40,314 for females. The per capita income for the CDP was $29,608. About 5.6% of families and 7.5% of the population were below the poverty line, including 16% of those under age 18 and 3.6% of those age 65 or over.

=== 2000 census ===
As of the census of 2000, there were 19,199 people, 7,272 households, and 5,330 families living in the CDP. The population density was 2,790.2 inhabitants per square mile (1,077.3/km^{2}). There were 7,518 housing units at an average density of 1,092.6 per square mile (421.9/km^{2}). The racial makeup of the CDP was 74.71% White, 21.20% African American, 0.24% Native American, 1.91% Asian, 0.06% Pacific Islander, 0.52% from other races, and 1.36% from two or more races. Hispanic or Latino of any race were 1.39% of the population.

In 2000, 2.7% of Rosedale residents identified as being of Greek heritage. This was the highest percentage of Greek Americans of any place in Maryland.

There were 7,272 households, out of which 30.1% had children under the age of 18 living with them, 54.0% were married couples living together, 14.2% had a female householder with no husband present, and 26.7% were non-families. 21.8% of all households were made up of individuals, and 10.3% had someone living alone who was 65 years of age or older. The average household size was 2.64 and the average family size was 3.07.

In the CDP, the population was spread out, with 23.8% under the age of 18, 7.6% from 18 to 24, 28.2% from 25 to 44, 23.9% from 45 to 64, and 16.6% who were 65 years of age or older. The median age was 39 years. For every 100 females, there were 91.2 males. For every 100 females age 18 and over, there were 88.5 males.

The median income for a household in the CDP was $47,801, and the median income for a family was $52,925. Males had a median income of $36,218 versus $29,278 for females. The per capita income for the CDP was $20,243. About 3.8% of families and 5.4% of the population were below the poverty line, including 6.6% of those under age 18 and 5.4% of those age 65 or over.

== Transportation ==
=== Roads ===
Some major roads in Rosedale are:

- Franklin Square Drive
- Golden Ring Road (MD 588)
- Hamilton Avenue
- Hazelwood Avenue
- Kenwood Avenue (MD 588)
- Lillian Holt Drive
- Philadelphia Road (MD 7)
- Pulaski Highway (US 40)
- John F. Kennedy Memorial Highway (I-95)
- Rossville Boulevard

== Notable people ==
- Stacy Keibler, former Baltimore Ravens cheerleader, professional wrestling diva and wrestler for the WWE (2001–2006), and actress
- Mike Rowe, American actor and voice-over artist
- Wayne Schafer, Pitmaster Big Fat Daddy's stand.
- Christi Shake, Playboy model

== See also ==
- 2011 Rosedale, Maryland beating
