= Foundry Row =

- Location: Owings Mills, Maryland, U.S.
- Coordinates: 39.41272°N 76.77330°W
- Address: 10100 Reisterstown Road
- Opened: 2016
- Developer: Greenberg Gibbons
- Manager: MCB Real Estate
- Owner: MCB Real Estate
- Num. of anchor tenants: 1
- Floor area: 342,147 square feet (31,786.5 m^{2})

Foundry Row is a lifestyle center/mixed-use development built on the former site of a Solo Cup Company factory in Owings Mills, Maryland, United States. Its anchor stores are Wegmans, Old Navy and Designer Shoe Warehouse. The center is located on the corner of Painters Mill Road and on the 10100 block on Maryland Route 140, providing easy access to the Owings Mills station and its neighboring Metro Centre at Owings Mills.

== History ==
Greenberg Gibbons, a real estate company based out of Owings Mills, Maryland, first announced plans for Foundry Row in 2014. The company demolished an abandoned building formerly used as a factory for the Solo Cup Company in order to develop a lifestyle center, a type of outdoor shopping mall.

Among the first stores confirmed for the complex was its largest tenant, a 101,000-square-foot (9,400 m^{2}) Wegmans supermarket. Greenberg Gibbons projected that construction of the mall would bring over 2,000 jobs to Owings Mills, and 3,000 more after completion. Other tenants would include Old Navy, La-Z-Boy, DSW, Ulta Beauty, Panera Bread, and Bar Louie. Also included in the center would be an office for LifeBridge Health.

Wegmans was the first store in the complex to open, doing so in September 2016. Two months later, the rest of the tenants in the center began opening, including the restaurants.

In 2019, Greenberg Gibbons announced plans to add a 437-unit apartment complex to the site.

Overall, Foundry Row has 342,147 square feet (31,786.5 m^{2}) of retail space and 39,000 square feet (3,600 m^{2}) of office space.
