= Northwest Expressway =

Northwest Expressway may refer to:

- Northwest Expressway (Boston), a section of US 3
- Northwest Expressway (Oklahoma City), a section of SH-3
- Northwest Expressway (Baltimore), Maryland, also known as I-795
- Kennedy Expressway in Chicago, formerly known as the Northwest Expressway
