= New Town High School (Maryland) =

Coordinates: 39.40197°N 76.81140°W

Location
- 4931 New Town Blvd. Owings Mills, Maryland; United States

Information
- Type: Public High School (9-12)
- Motto: "Today we learn; Tomorrow we lead"
- Established: 2003
- Founder: Margaret I. Spicer (2003-2006)
- School district: Baltimore County Public Schools
- Principal: James Martin
- Grades: 9-12
- Campus: 64 acres (260,000 m^{2})
- Colors: Burgundy and Gold
- Mascot: Titan
- Website: newtownhs.bcps.org
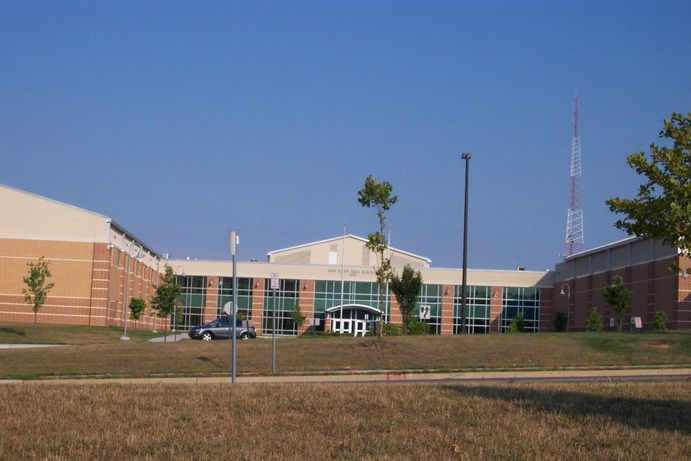
- New Town High School

New Town High School (NTHS) is a four-year public magnet high school in Baltimore County, Maryland, United States. It is located on the northwest side of the county west of I-795 in Owings Mills, Maryland.

== About the school ==
New Town High School was constructed in 2003 and is located at 4931 New Town Boulevard in Owings Mills, Maryland, across the street from New Town Elementary School. NTHS was built, in part, to ease overcrowding issues in neighboring schools within the district. The district borders those of Franklin High School, Owings Mills High School, Pikesville High School, and Randallstown High School.

=== Former principals ===
- 2003-2006: Dr. Margaret Spicer
- 2006-2010: Barbara Cheswick
- 2010–2014: Sam Mustipher
- 2014-2018: Kevin Whatley

=== Cisco Networking Academy ===
NTHS is one of many utilized Cisco NetRider Substations around Maryland and the United States. Howard Jackson is the local leader of the NTHS NetRider Division.

== Academics ==
New Town High School received a 50.6 out of a possible 90 points (56%) on the 2018-2019 Maryland State Department of Education Report Card and received a 3 out of 5 star rating, ranking in the 38th percentile among all Maryland schools.

== Students ==
The 2019–2020 enrollment at New Town High School was 1168 students.

The graduation rate at NTHS was 92% in 2006 (the first year that data is available). The school opened to freshman and sophomore students for the 2003-04 academic year. Each successive year, another class was enrolled until a full population consisting of four grade levels was established. The enrollment statistics are 92% African-American, 3.8% Caucasian, and 2.8% Asian/Pacific Islander.

Student population

- 2008: 947
- 2007: 1,019
- 2006: 960
- 2005: 710
- 2004: 437

== Graduation ceremonies ==
The Class of 2006 was New Town High School's first graduating class. Graduation regalia consists of a gold cap and gown for female graduates and a burgundy cap and gown for male graduates. The tassel is burgundy and gold for both genders. Like all Baltimore County Public Schools graduation ceremonies, New Town High School graduation ceremonies take place at Towson University's SECU Arena.

== Athletics ==
New Town High School's mascot and colors were established after a student vote when the school first opened. By a near-unanimous vote, the mascot chosen was the Titan, and the colors selected were burgundy, black, and gold. Since its establishment, the school has won a total of 14 varsity state championships (individual and team), 16 varsity regional championships, 19 varsity division championships, five junior varsity county championships, and six junior varsity division championships. Individuals and teams from New Town have also finished runner-up in the varsity state finals five times.

=== State championships ===
Girls Basketball

- 2A 2017

Boys Basketball

- 1A 2007, 2015
- 2A 2016, 2023

Track and Field

- 2A 2023 indoor Boys relay

== School publications ==
The Titan Chronicle is New Town High School’s student newspaper. It serves as an open forum to inform and reflect the opinions of students and the New Town High School community. The first academic adviser of The Titan Chronicle was BCPS English teacher, Rebecca Plovan. She taught journalism at New Town High School up until 2006 when she transferred to Owings Mills High School. In 2006, a new hire in the English department, Adam Carney, took over as the paper's academic adviser. He brought with him new concepts for the paper including changes in design, layout, content, and even took a class vote to have the publication's name changed to The Titan Times. The new name stuck for a brief period but was eventually reverted to The Titan Chronicle. TV 49 headed by David Davis and Walter Johnson a morning News Broadcast each day. Broadcasting education with a school built-in media studio.

== Noted alumni ==
- Corin Henry - professional basketball player
- Quincy Roche - professional football player with the Pittsburgh Steelers

== See also ==
- List of Schools in Baltimore County, Maryland
