= Quincy Roche =

American football player (born 1998)

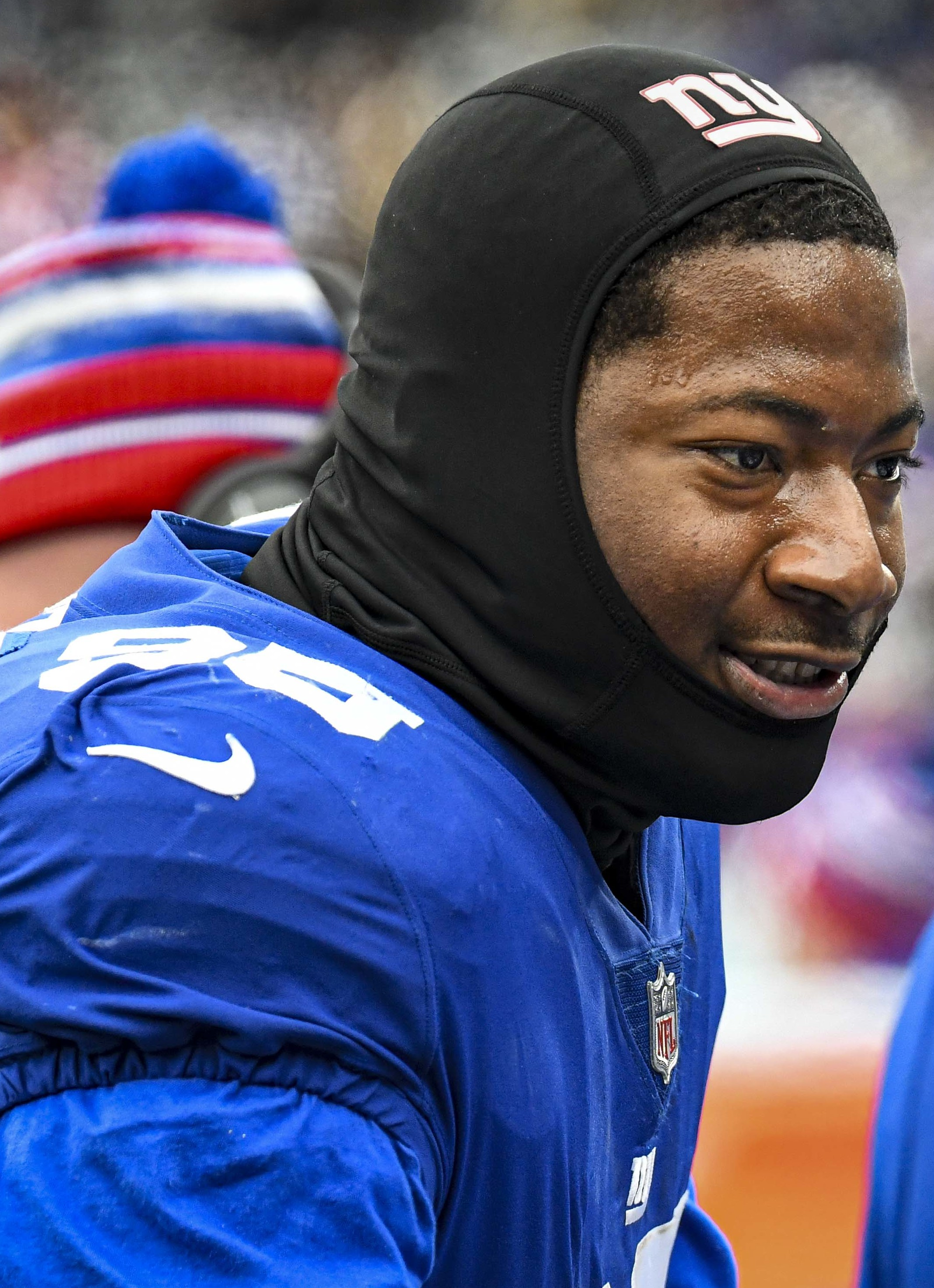
- Roche with the New York Giants in 2022

Profile
- Position: Linebacker

Personal information
- Born: February 10, 1998 (age 28); Randallstown, Maryland, U.S.
- Listed height: 6 ft 3 in (1.91 m)
- Listed weight: 245 lb (111 kg)

Career information
- High school: New Town (Owings Mills, Maryland)
- College: Temple (2016–2019); Miami (FL) (2020)
- NFL draft: 2021: 6th round, 216th overall pick

Career history
- Pittsburgh Steelers (2021)*; New York Giants (2021–2022); Pittsburgh Steelers (2023)*; Minnesota Vikings (2023)*; Baltimore Ravens (2024)*; DC Defenders (2025)*
- * Offseason or practice squad member only

Awards and highlights
- AAC Defensive Player of the Year (2019); First-team All-AAC (2019); Third-team All-ACC (2020)

Career NFL statistics as of 2023
- Total tackles: 40
- Sacks: 2.5
- Forced fumbles: 1
- Stats at Pro Football Reference

Quincy Roche (born February 10, 1998) is an American professional football linebacker. He played college football for the Temple Owls and Miami Hurricanes, and has played in the NFL for the New York Giants.

== Early life ==
Roche attended New Town High School in Owings Mills, Maryland. He played defensive end and tight end in high school. He committed to Temple University to play college football.

== College career ==
Roche played at Temple from 2016 to 2019. During that time he recorded 137 tackles and 26 sacks. In 2019, he was the American Athletic Conference Defensive Player of the Year and was named an All-American by Sports Illustrated after recording 13 sacks. Prior to the 2020 season, Roche transferred to the University of Miami.

== Professional career ==
Pre-draft measurables
Height	Weight	Arm length	Hand span	40-yard dash	10-yard split	20-yard split	20-yard shuttle	Three-cone drill	Vertical jump	Broad jump	Bench press
6 ft 2 5/8 in (1.90 m)	245 lb (111 kg)	32 1/4 in (0.82 m)	9 1/4 in (0.23 m)	4.68 s	1.69 s	2.78 s	4.50 s	7.20 s	32.5 in (0.83 m)	9 ft 11 in (3.02 m)	23 reps
All values from Pro Day

=== Pittsburgh Steelers (first stint) ===
Roche was selected by the Pittsburgh Steelers in the sixth round, 216th overall, of the 2021 NFL draft. On May 15, 2021, he signed his four-year rookie contract with Pittsburgh. He was waived on August 31, 2021.

=== New York Giants ===
On September 1, 2021, Roche was claimed off waivers by the New York Giants. In Week 9 game against the Las Vegas Raiders Roche recorded his first sack forced fumble of his career helping the Giants beat the Raiders, 23–16.

On August 30, 2022, Roche was released but signed to the Giants practice squad the next day. On September 10, 2022, Roche was elevated from the practice squad for the week 1 game against the Tennessee Titans. He was signed to the active roster on October 22. On November 23, 2022, he was waived and re-signed to the practice squad.

=== Pittsburgh Steelers (second stint) ===
On January 24, 2023, Roche signed a reserve/future contract with the Steelers. He was waived on August 29, 2023.

=== Minnesota Vikings ===
On October 25, 2023, Roche signed on to the Minnesota Vikings practice squad. He was not signed to a reserve/future contract and became a free agent at the end of the season.

=== Baltimore Ravens ===
On July 30, 2024, Roche signed with the Baltimore Ravens. He was waived on August 13.

=== DC Defenders ===
On December 23, 2024, Roche signed with the DC Defenders of the United Football League (UFL). He was released on March 20, 2025.
