= Owings Mills Mall =

Defunct mall in Baltimore County, Maryland, U.S.

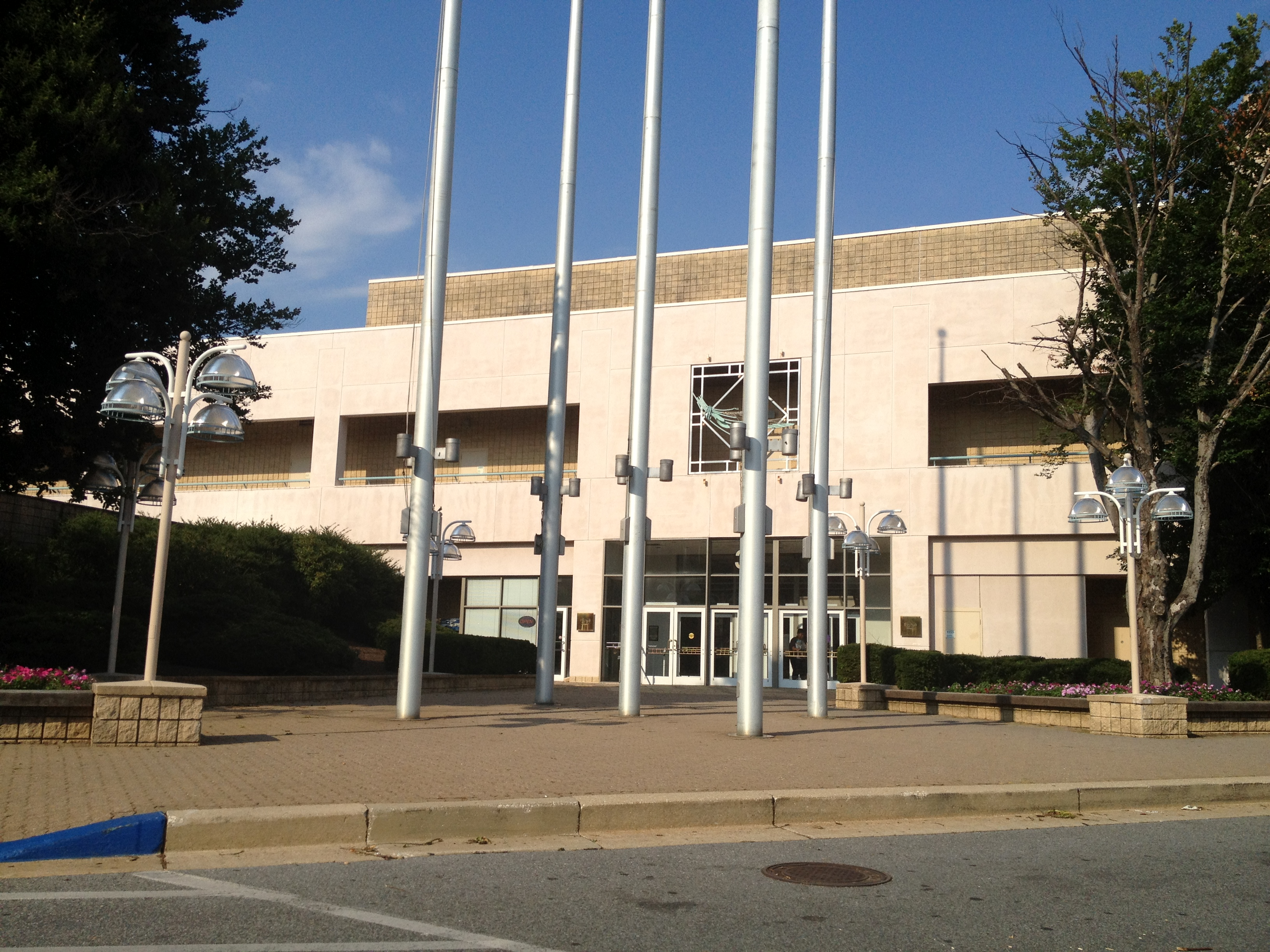
- Main entrance (June 2012)
- Location: Owings Mills, Maryland, U.S.
- Coordinates: 39°24′27″N 76°47′23″W
- Address: 10300 Mill Run Circle, 21117
- Opened: July 30, 1986; 40 years ago
- Renovated: 1998
- Closed: September 23, 2015; 11 years ago
- Demolished: August 2016 – March 2017
- Previous names: Owings Mills Town Center (1981–1986); Owings Mills Fashion Mall (1986–1998)
- Developer: The Rouse Company
- Owner: Kimco Realty Corporation
- Architect: RTKL Associates
- Num. of stores: 155 (at peak)
- Num. of anchor tenants: 4 (at peak)
- Floor area: 828,219 square feet (76,944.1 m^{2})
- Floors: 2 (3 in former Macy's)
- Parking: Parking lot with 5,270 free spaces
- Website: Archived February 8, 2014, at the Wayback Machine
- Building details
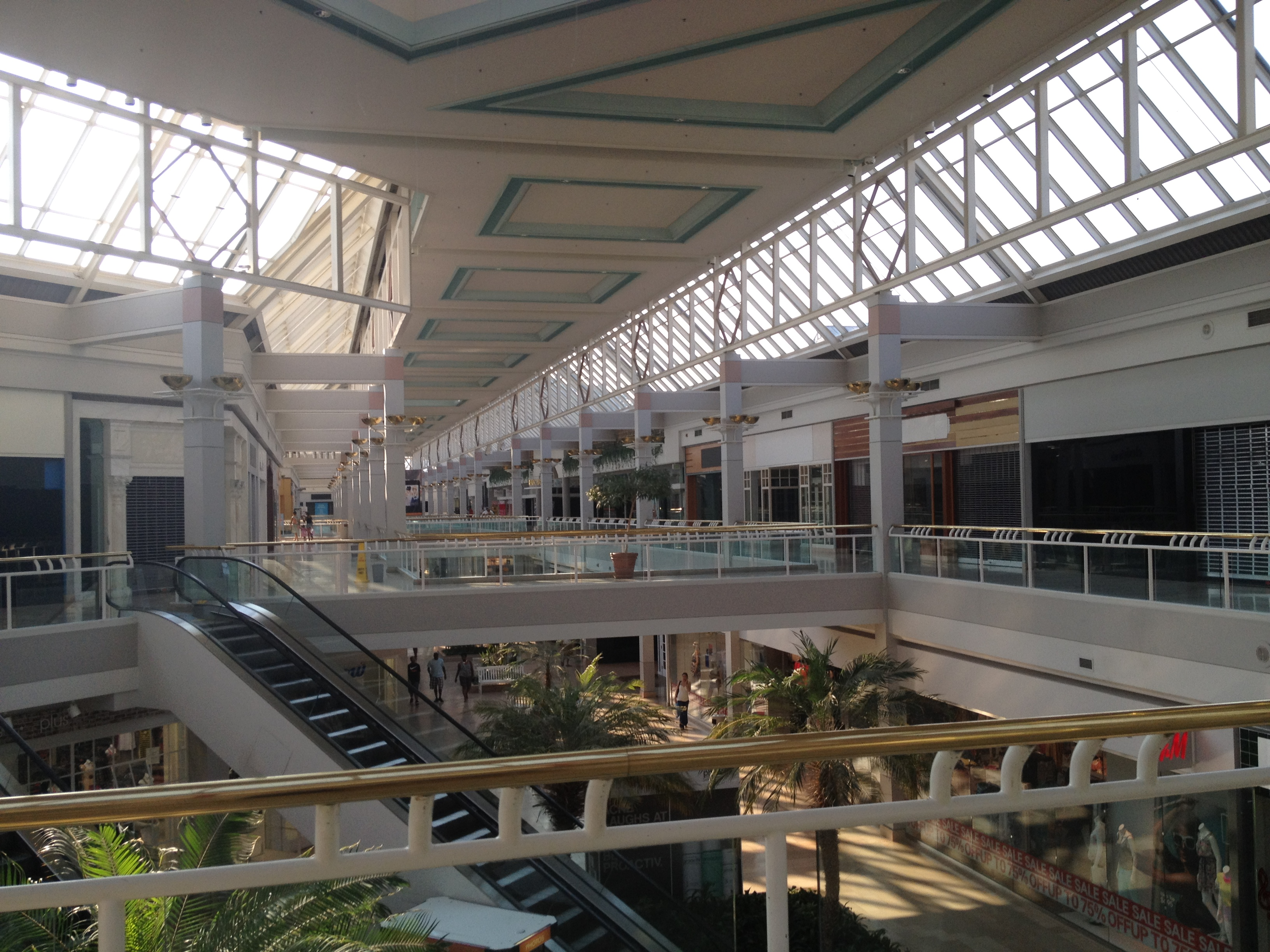
- Interior view, second floor (June 2012)

General information
- Status: Demolished
- Construction started: 1984; 42 years ago
- Completed: 1986

Design and construction
- Main contractor: HCB Contractors

Renovating team
- Renovating firm: The Rouse Co.

Owings Mills Mall was a regional mall in Owings Mills, Maryland, United States, that hosted 155 stores and eateries, in the Baltimore County, Maryland, community of Owings Mills. The mall was owned and managed by General Growth Properties (GGP) and Kimco Realty Corporation. While its main entrance was off Red Run Boulevard between Painters Mill Road and Owings Mills Boulevard, the mall was also accessible from the exit ramps of I-795.

It was originally known as Owings Mills Town Center during planning. It was also known as Owings Mills Fashion Mall when it opened, but the "Fashion" part was eventually dropped. The mall was completely demolished in 2017, and redeveloped in 2019 as Mill Station. The mall's final anchor store was JCPenney, which closed its doors on April 8, 2016. Previous anchors were Bambergers, Hecht's, Macy's, Boscov's, Lord & Taylor, Saks Fifth Avenue, and Sears. The mall experienced the closures of several national stores, leaving multiple vacancies.

== History ==
=== 1981–1986: Development and opening ===
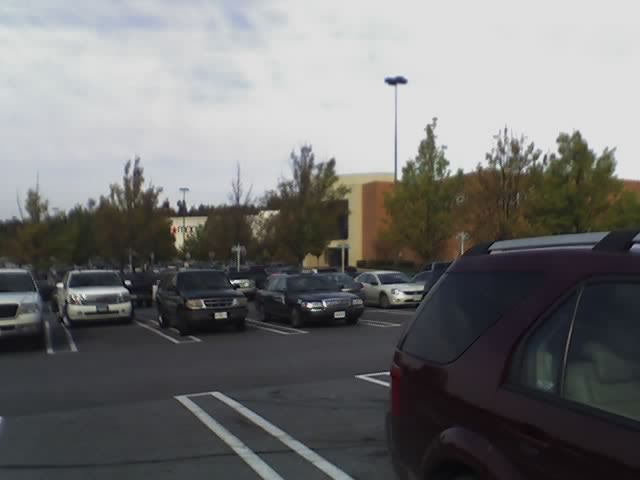
Parking lot (November 2007)

The mall was announced as early as March 1981, with vague plans that compared it to the White Marsh Mall in size. By late 1983, a summer 1986 opening had been announced, and the mall was to feature three department store anchors with plans for two more. Anchors Saks Fifth Avenue, Bambergers, and Hecht's were announced in 1984. The area was identified as a primary growth center in 1979 by Baltimore County and originally intended to be built around a 100-acre (40 ha) lake, with $2 million invested in the project. The Rouse Company planned to develop the mall and surrounding area as Owings Mills Town Center, similar to its town center project in Columbia, Maryland. Environmental regulations changed during the time between the development of Columbia and Owings Mills, and the Army Corps of Engineers concluded the lake would have a negative environmental impact. The area does not include the waterfront focal point initially planned, which is why the "Owings Mills Town Center" name was never used when the mall opened. The mall had its grand opening celebration on July 30, 1986 as Owings Mills Fashion Mall, being 95% leased and having 80% of stores open.

=== 1987–2017: Decline, closure, and demolition ===
The Baltimore Metro Subway opened the Owings Mills Metro Subway Station one year after Owings Mills Mall. Shuttle bus service with a ten minute round trip was provided between the mall and the station. This shuttle bus service was discontinued in June 1992, leaving a less frequent bus service that provided this link only every 30 to 60 minutes.

==== Christina Brown murder ====
At 2:18 p.m. EDT on September 25, 1992, Christina Marie Brown was found dead from a gunshot wound to the back of the head along the vegetation lined portion of the path between the mall and the Metro station. She was found ten minutes after leaving work as an employee of a cleaning company under contract to Saks Fifth Avenue at the mall, and was believed to have been traveling to the Metro station, en route to her home in Baltimore City. Brown was shot after she resisted a robbery attempt, and her purse, containing about $120, was taken. The pathway was closed on November 25, 1992, in response to Brown's murder. The murder received heavy local media attention, which led to a long-standing perception that Owings Mills Mall was unsafe. After the closure of the trail, a walk between the mall and metro became impractical for most, thereby requiring the use of regular bus service.

Towson Town Center undergone a massive expansion that added Nordstrom in October 1991, making it the final blow to Owings Mills Mall's upscale status. Saks Fifth Avenue began liquidation sales in early November 1995 (with a projected closure date of January 6, 1996), and was replaced with JCPenney. In 1997, bus service between the two locations was improved. The ease of public transportation allowed visitors from inner city urban areas to get to and from this mall much more easily than other suburban malls in the Baltimore metropolitan area. In 1998, following the Rouse Co.'s acquisition of Towson Town Center, they expanded and renovated Owings Mills Mall and dropped "Fashion" from the mall's name, due to Rouse's strategical repositioning of the mall to serve as a general "middle-market" shopping center rather than a "fashion" destination to avoid cannibalization. As part of the expansion, a 17-screen movie theater operated by the General Cinema Corporation (GCC) (later AMC Theatres) with stadium seating would be added, alongside Sears and Lord & Taylor, which closed in 2001 and 2002, respectively. By April 4, 2003, the mall featured Gap & Gap Kids, the Disney Store, Ann Taylor, The Limited, and Nine West. Rouse and its assets, including Owings Mills Mall, was acquired by General Growth Properties of Chicago, Illinois in November 2004 for $12.6 billion.

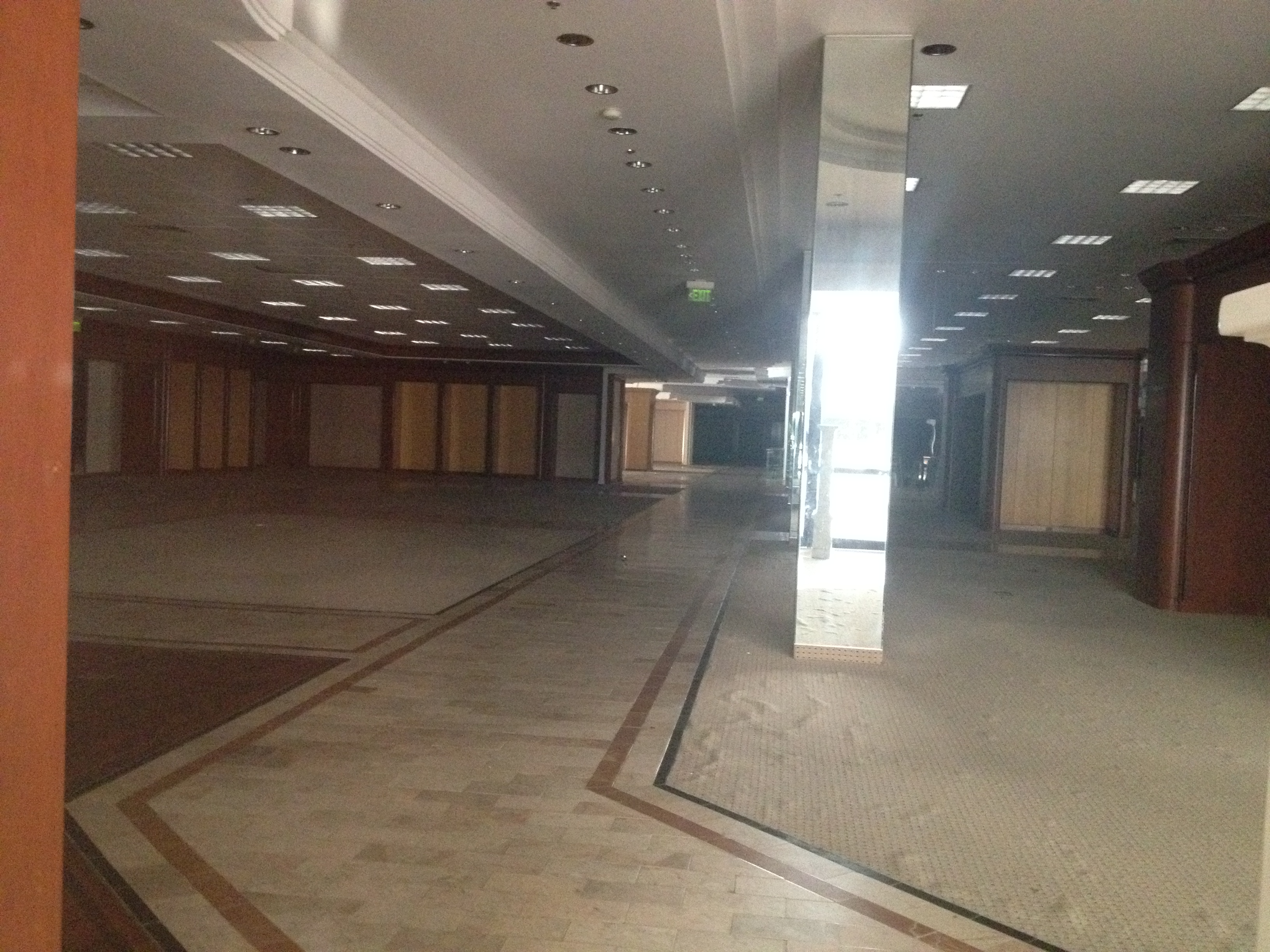
Former Lord & Taylor (June 2012)

Federated Department Stores would acquire Hecht's in September 2006, with Macy's moving into the former Hecht's building following the conversion of every Hecht's location to Macy's, and Boscov's would move into the original Macy's building. However, Boscov's announced in August 2008 that this location would close as part of a plan to close ten locations nationwide due to the company filing for Chapter 11 bankruptcy.

An October 2010 story on the mall in The Baltimore Sun stated that the mall was 22.6% vacant. WBAL-TV reported on November 10, 2011, that after GGP and Kimco Realty Corporation formed a 50/50 joint venture to redevelop Owings Mills Mall, they planned to tear down the building in 2013, and replace it with a new, $65 million "outdoor-style" shopping center similar to the revamped Hunt Valley Towne Centre, with a projected completion date of 2014. An October 2014 story in the Baltimore Business Journal stated that the mall was "about half vacant." However, the redevelopment plans faced backlash from locals due to the neighboring Foundry Row and Metro Centre at Owings Mills developments, which also made tenants hesitant to sign on.

In late September 2015, the interior of the mall was quietly closed, leaving only Macy's, JCPenney, out-parcel restaurants and the adjacent movie theater in operation. Macy's closed in November 2015, and JCPenney announced on January 13, 2016, that it would close permanently in the spring, leaving the mall with no anchors. Weeks after that announcement, Kimco Realty purchased GGP's shares in the property for $11.5 million. Fixtures from the mall were auctioned in March of that year. Prior to demolition, the mall suffered vandalism and structural decay. Demolition of the mall commenced in August 2016, and was completed in March 2017, with the exception of AMC Owings Mills 17 and Owings Mills Restaurant Park.

== Redevelopment as Mill Station ==
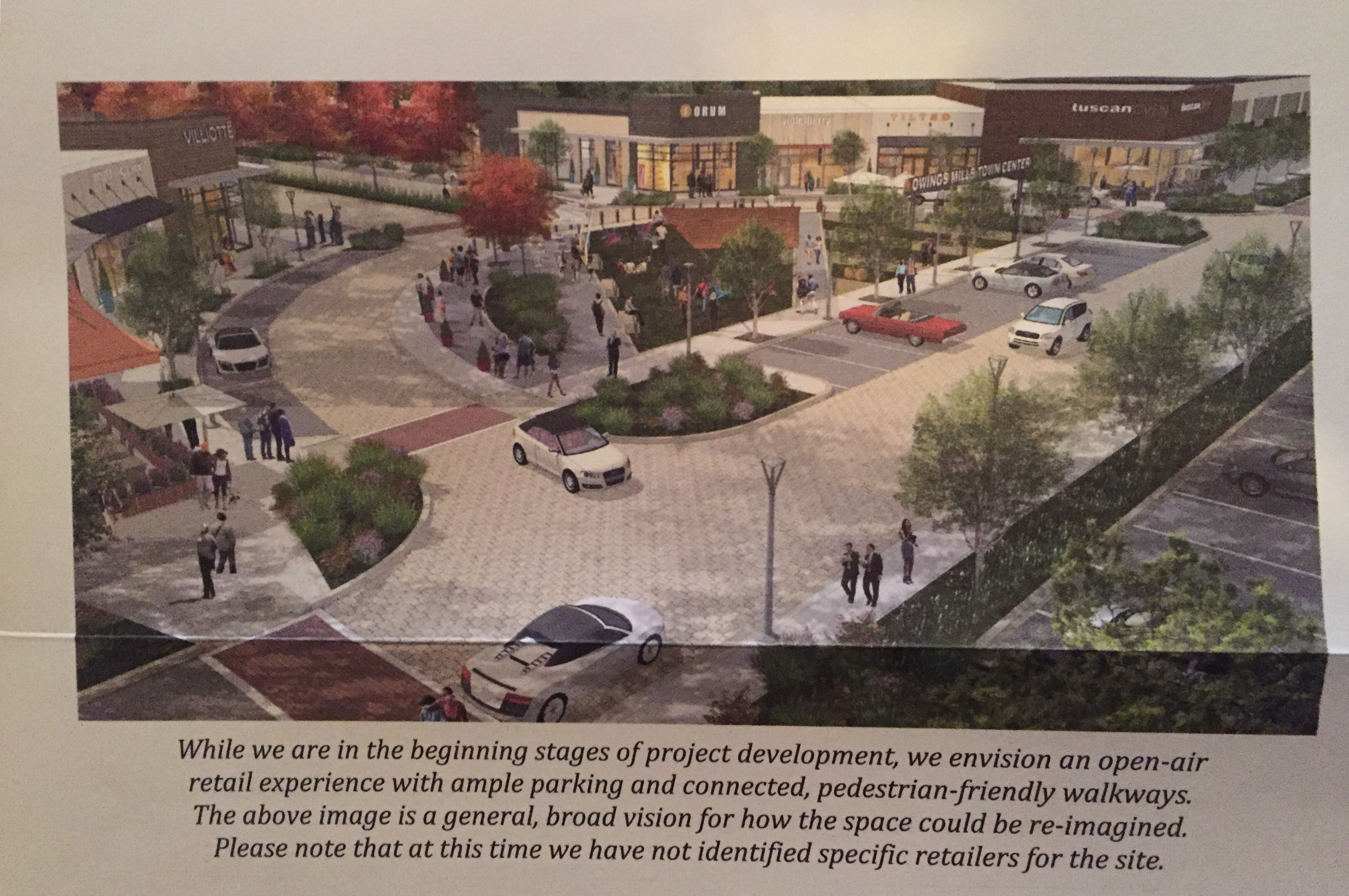
A rendering of the proposed redevelopment (January 2017)

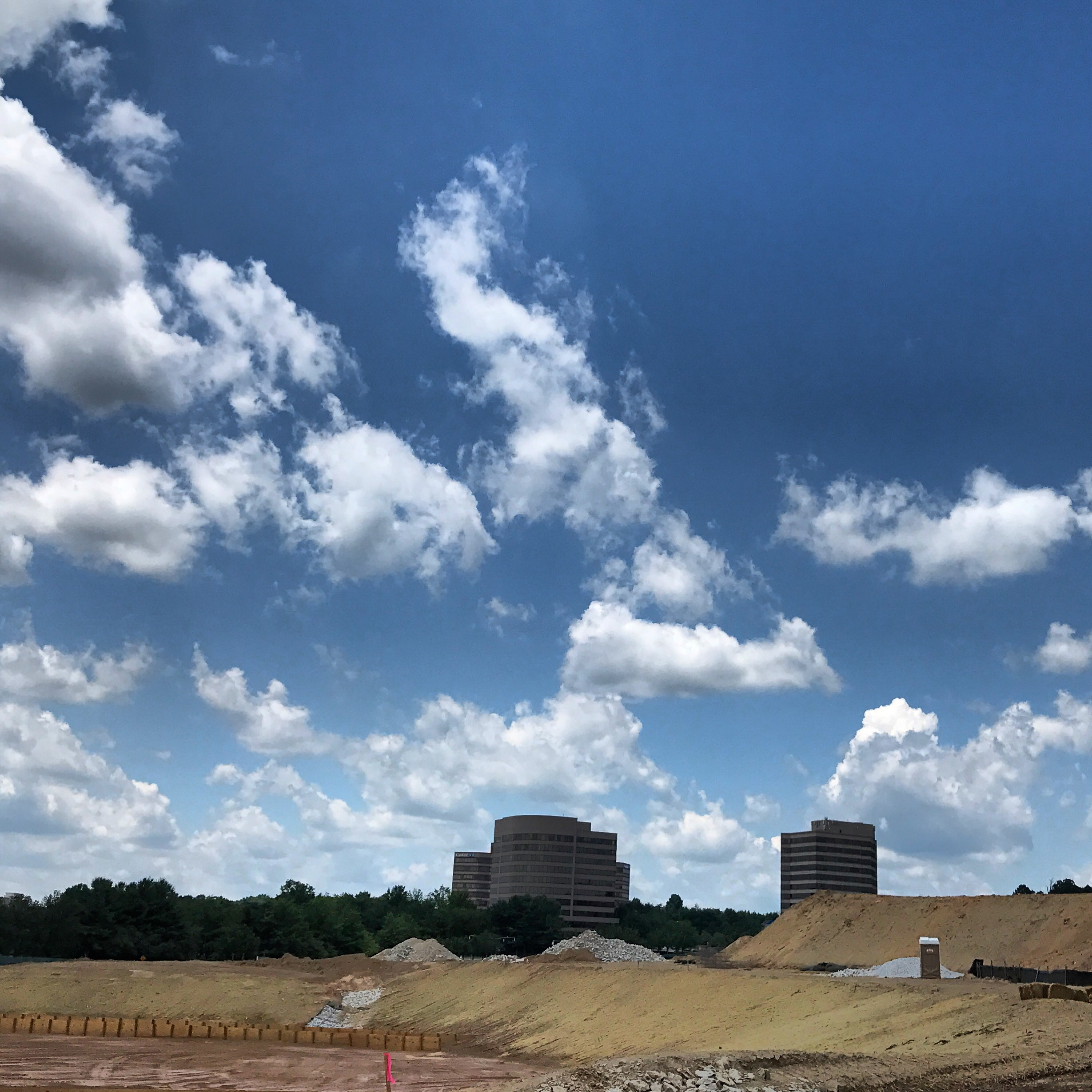
After demolition (July 2017) with the BECO Towers in the background

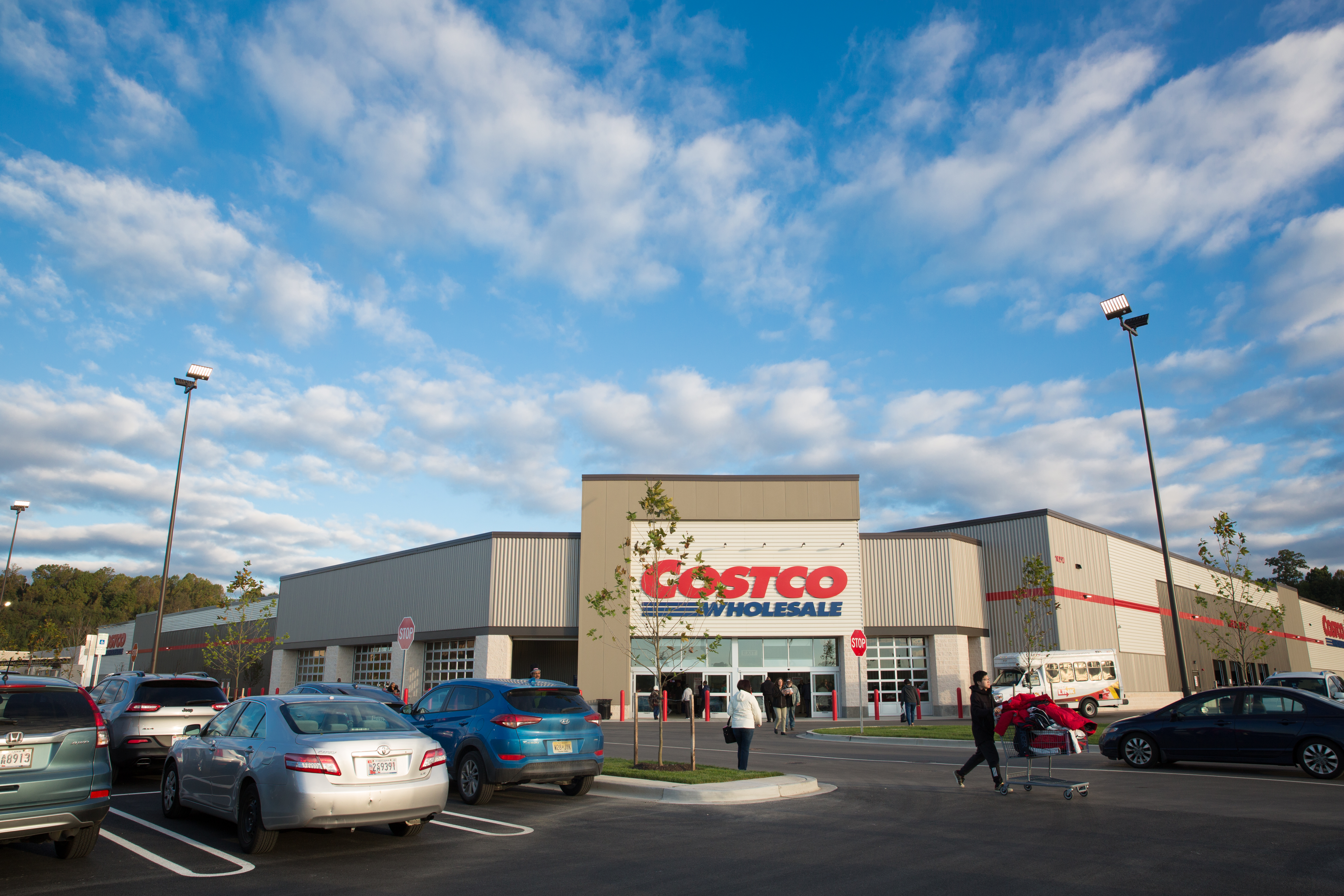
Costco shortly after its grand opening (October 2018)

As of March 2017, Owings Mills Mall was completely demolished, and readied for redevelopment.

On December 5, 2017, it was announced that the property would be redeveloped as a lifestyle shopping center called Mill Station. The $108 million project would be 575,000 square feet (53,400 m^{2}) and anchored by Costco, Lowe's, and Dick's Sporting Goods, with at least 30 total tenants. Construction began in late December 2017 and was completed in early 2019.

Costco, however, opened in October 2018. AMC Owings Mills 17 was also fully remodeled. By April 2023, it was announced that 11 restaurants would be open at the center by 2025, being Applebee's, Starbucks, Panda Express, Boardwalk Burgers & Fries, Jamba Juice, Cinnaholic, R&R Taqueria, Papi Cuisine, Carolina Kitchen, First Watch, and Honeygrow.

== Adjacent properties ==
As part of its expansion, Owings Mills Restaurant Park opened next to the mall in 1998, developed by Rouse as an open-air food court. During the redevelopment, the park was rebranded the Restaurants at Mill Station. It is a collection of five sit-down restaurants with 6,000 to 7,000 sq ft (560 to 650 m^{2}) such as Red Robin Gourmet Burgers & Brews, The Greene Turtle Sports Bar & Grille, Red Lobster and the Olive Garden, which closed on June 14, 2023.

Announced in early January 2024, Volcano Hot Pot & BBQ would take over the former space left by Olive Garden. A mixed-use, transit-oriented development first called Owings Mills Metro Centre (now Metro Centre at Owings Mills), exists alongside Mill Station. BECO Towers, formerly the Owings Mills Corporate Center until January 2013, is an office complex adjacent to Owings Mills Mall and now Mill Station. Firms operated there include CareFirst BlueCross BlueShield and Truist (formerly BB&T until it merged with SunTrust).

== Gallery ==
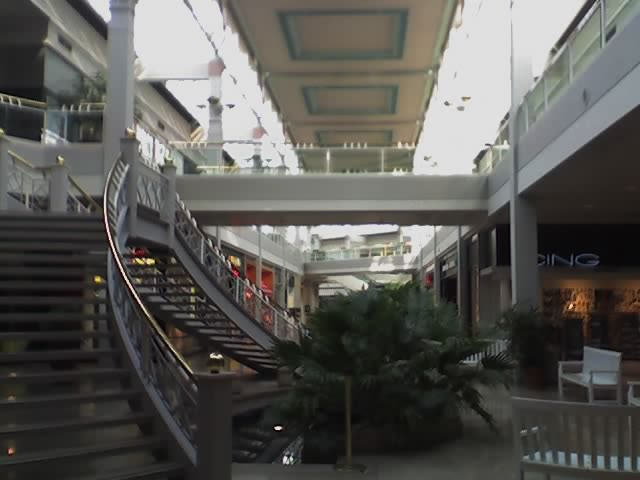
Interior view, first floor (November 2007)

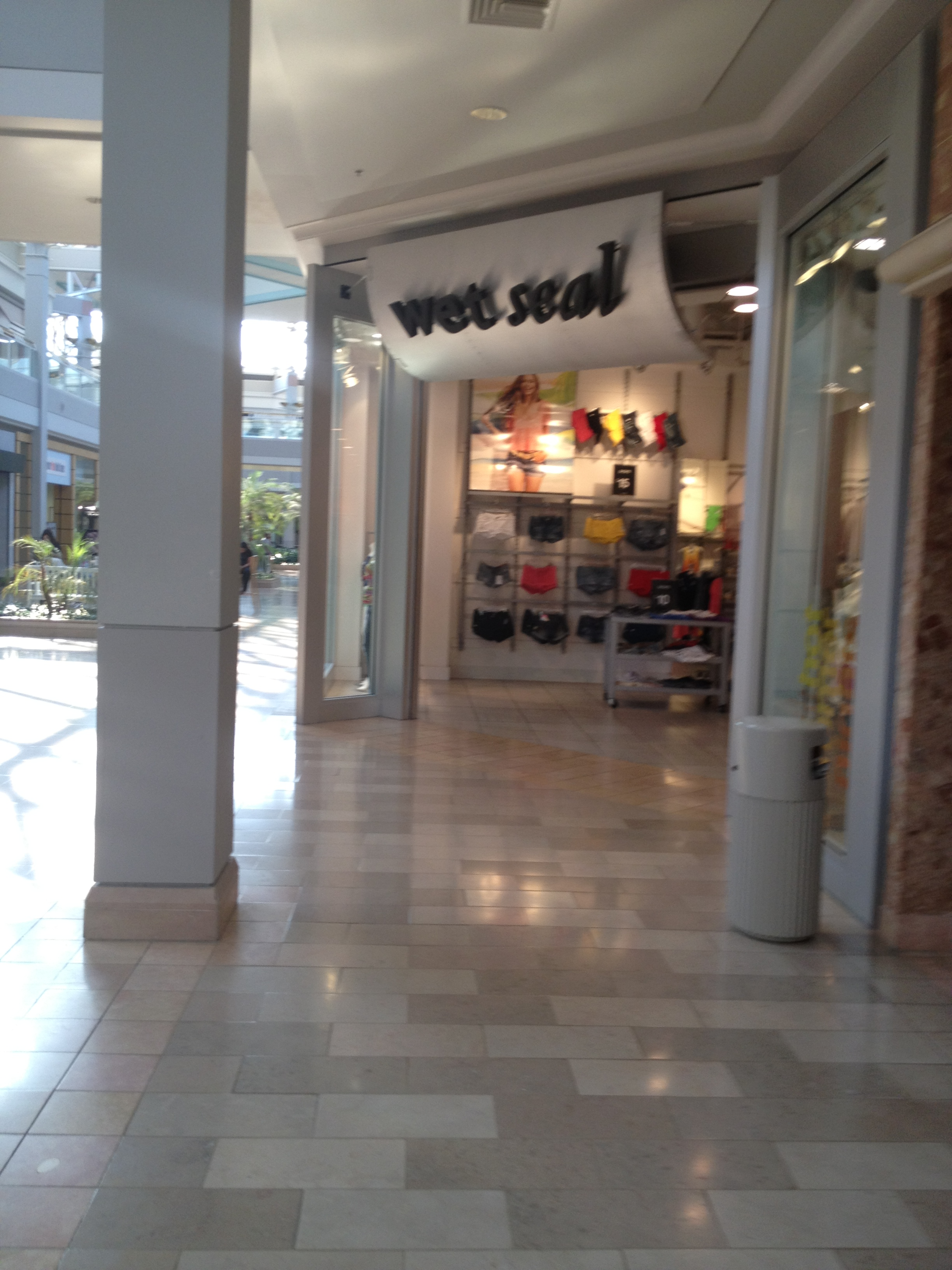
Wet Seal storefront (June 2012) Closed due to bankruptcy and liquidation

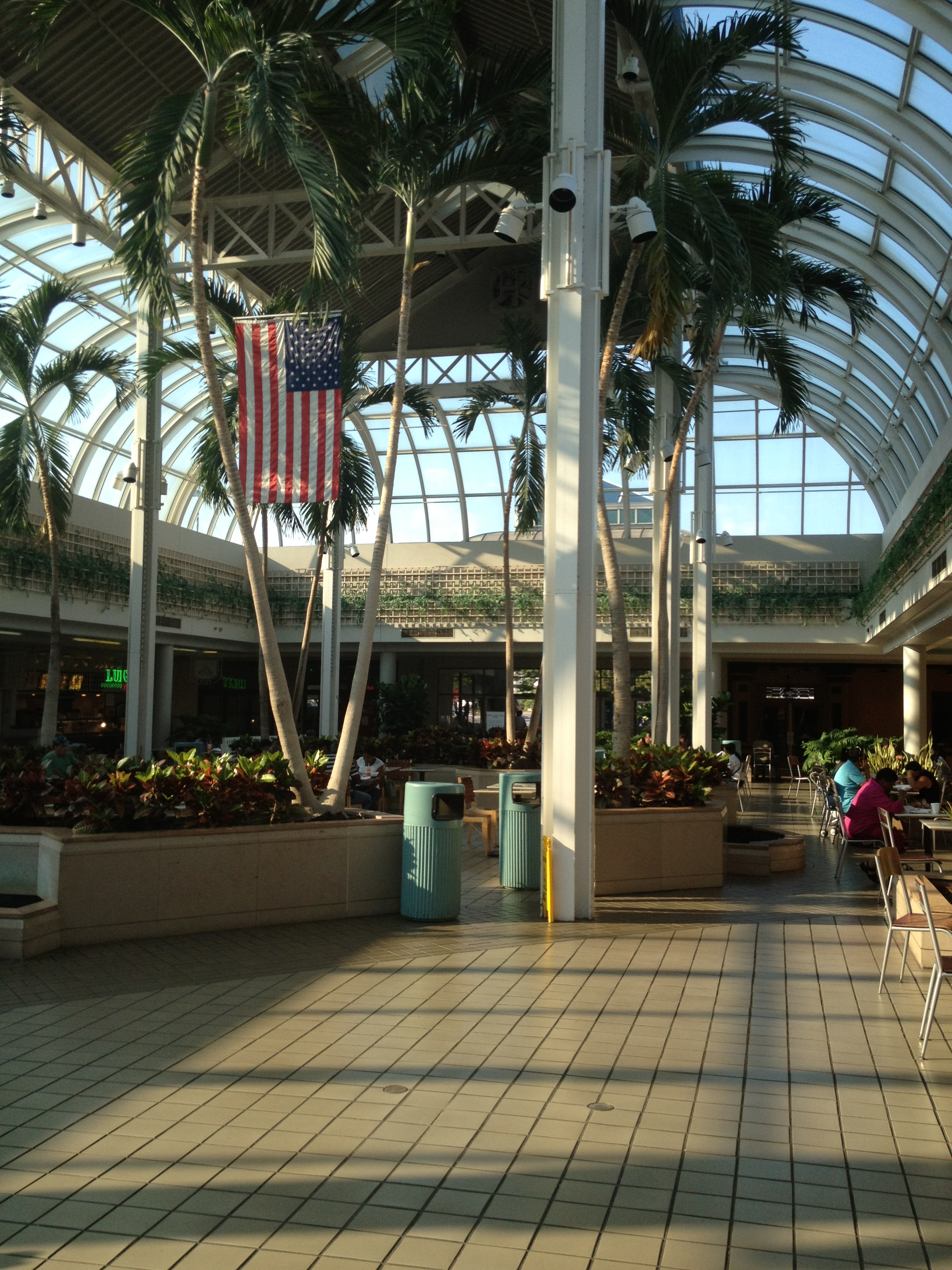
The Conservatory food court (June 2012)

== See also ==
- Collin Creek Mall, a similarly failed mall also designed by RTKL
- Harborplace & The Gallery – a similarly failed mall also developed by The Rouse Company in Baltimore, Maryland
- Harundale Mall / Harundale Plaza, a shopping mall also developed by Rouse that was demolished and replaced with a power center
- Towson Commons and Circle East
- White Marsh Mall, the surviving equivalent to Owings Mills Mall also developed by Rouse and designed by RTKL
- White Marsh Town Center
