= Donovan Smith =

American football player (born 1993)

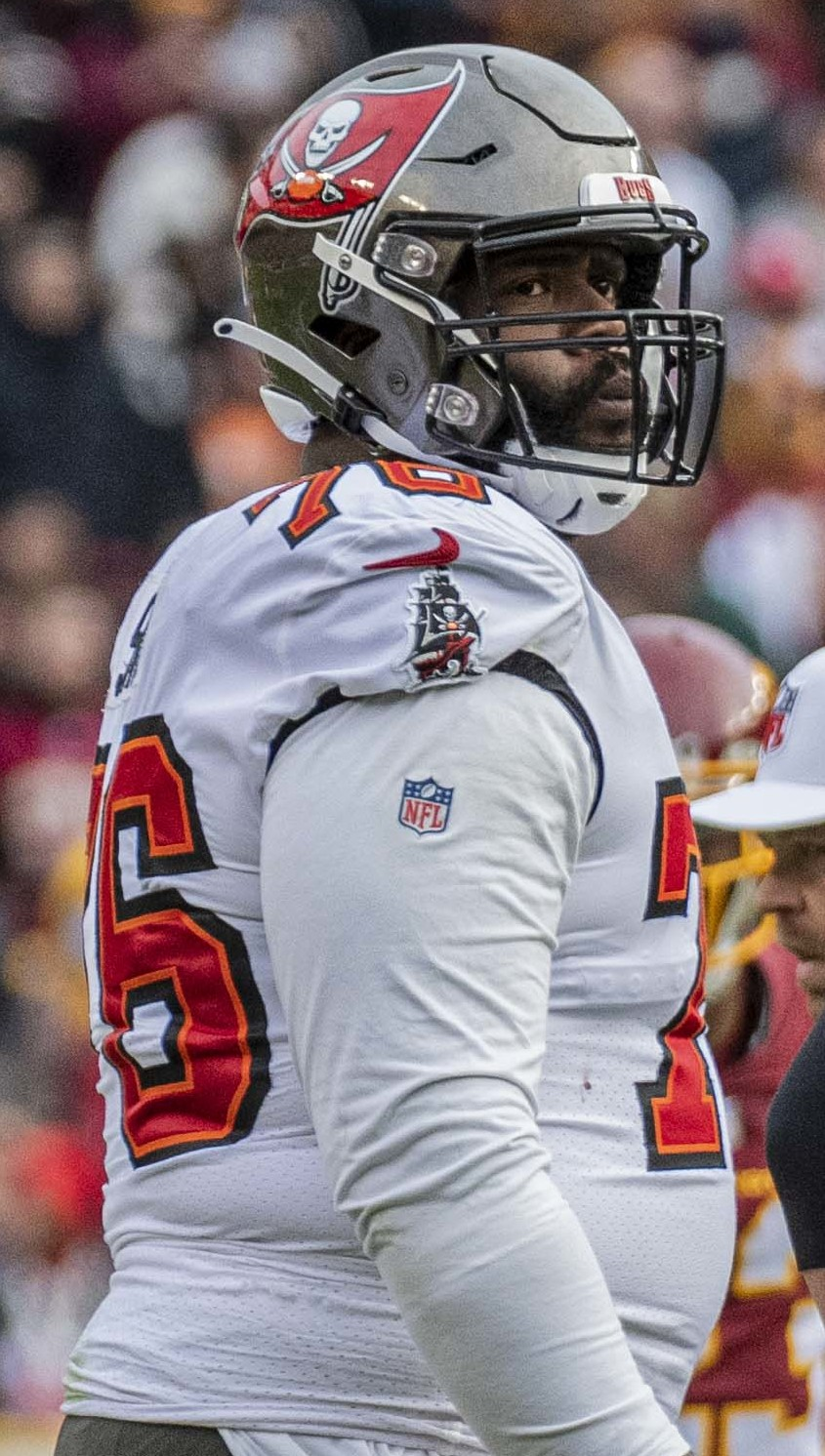
- Smith with the Tampa Bay Buccaneers in 2021

No. 76, 79
- Position: Offensive tackle

Personal information
- Born: June 23, 1993 (age 33); Hempstead, New York, U.S.
- Listed height: 6 ft 6 in (1.98 m)
- Listed weight: 338 lb (153 kg)

Career information
- High school: Owings Mills (Owings Mills, Maryland)
- College: Penn State (2011–2014)
- NFL draft: 2015: 2nd round, 34th overall pick

Career history
- Tampa Bay Buccaneers (2015–2022); Kansas City Chiefs (2023)

Awards and highlights
- 2× Super Bowl champion (LV, LVIII); PFWA All-Rookie Team (2015)

Career NFL statistics
- Games played: 136
- Games started: 136
- Stats at Pro Football Reference

Donovan Cole Smith (born June 23, 1993) is an American former professional football player who was an offensive tackle in the National Football League (NFL). He played college football for the Penn State Nittany Lions and was selected by the Tampa Bay Buccaneers in the second round of the 2015 NFL draft.

== Early life ==
Smith was born in Hempstead, New York and lived in New York until he and his twin sister moved to Owings Mills, Maryland prior to their sophomore year in high school to live with their uncle and his wife.

He attended Owings Mills High School, where he played football. He did not allow a single sack as a junior or senior and also was a standout defensive lineman. Smith played in the 2011 U.S. Army All-American Bowl. Smith also participated in track & field. Smith was rated by Rivals.com as a four-star recruit and was ranked as the ninth-best offensive tackle in his class. He committed to Penn State to play college football.

== College career ==
Smith attended Penn State from 2011 to 2014. After redshirting his first year, Smith became a starter in 2012 and would start 31 games during his career.

After the 2014 season, Smith decided to forgo his final year of eligibility and entered the 2015 NFL draft.

== Professional career ==
Pre-draft measurables
Height	Weight	Arm length	Hand span	40-yard dash	10-yard split	20-yard split	20-yard shuttle	Three-cone drill	Vertical jump	Broad jump	Bench press
6 ft 5 5/8 in (1.97 m)	338 lb (153 kg)	34 3/8 in (0.87 m)	10 5/8 in (0.27 m)	5.01 s	1.82 s	3.04 s	4.79 s	7.95 s	32 in (0.81 m)	9 ft 1 in (2.77 m)	26 reps
All values from NFL Combine except 40 yd dash from Penn State Pro Day

=== Tampa Bay Buccaneers ===
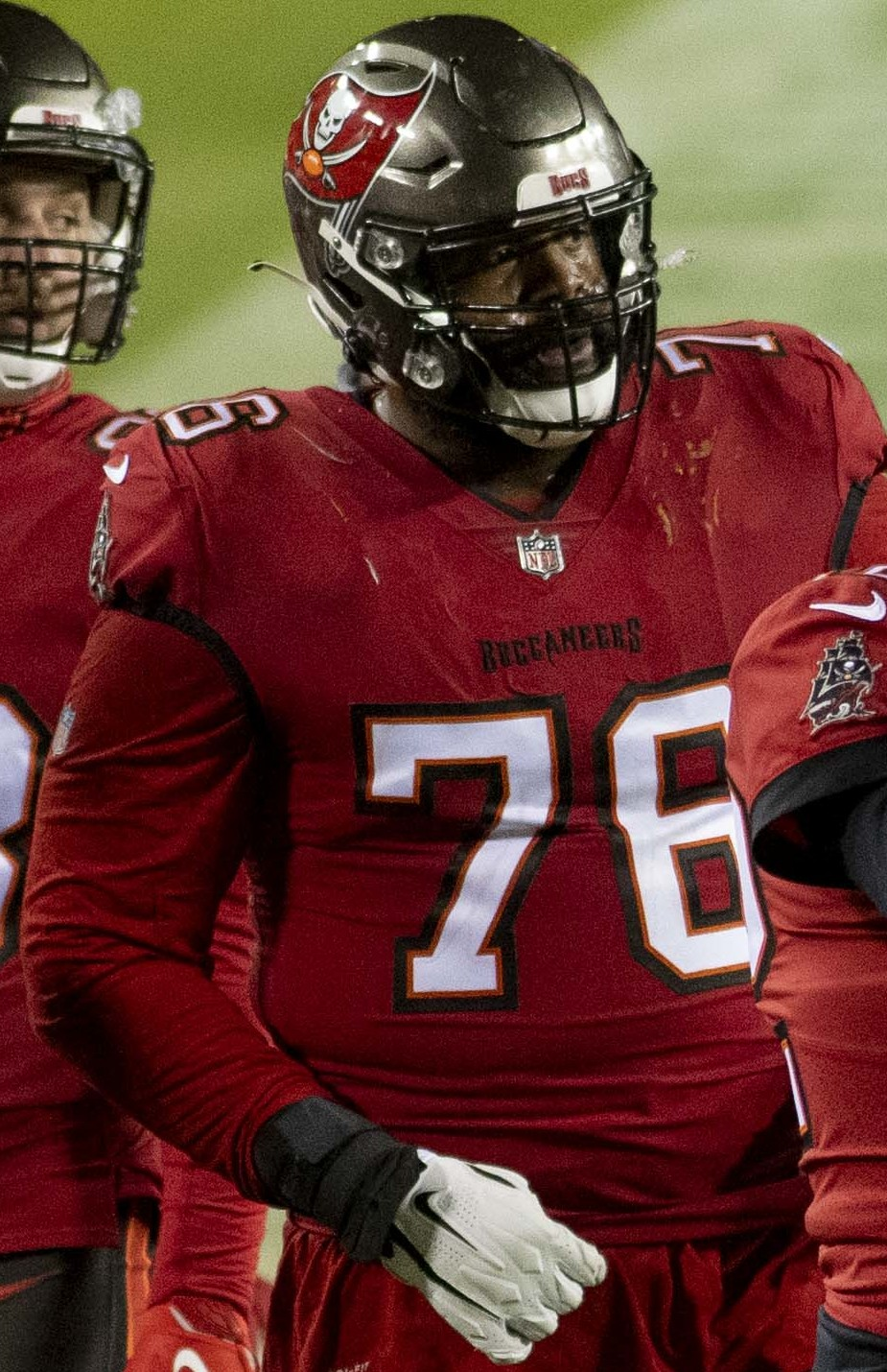
Smith in January 2021

The Tampa Bay Buccaneers selected Smith in the second round with the 34th overall pick in the 2015 NFL draft. On June 1, 2015, the Buccaneers signed him to a four-year, $6.06 million contract with $4.37 million guaranteed and a signing bonus of $2.67 million.

He entered his rookie season as the Buccaneers' starting left tackle. Smith started the Buccaneers' season-opening loss to the Tennessee Titans. He finished his rookie season starting all 16 regular season contests. He was named to the PFWA All-Rookie Team.

Smith was named the starting left tackle again the following season under new head coach Dirk Koetter. In the 2016 season, he played in all 16 games and started 15. In the 2017 and 2018 seasons, he started all 16 games.

On March 5, 2019, Smith signed a three-year, $41.5 million contract extension with the Buccaneers.

Smith was placed on the reserve/COVID-19 list by the team on December 18, 2020, and activated on December 22. Smith played and started all four games in the Buccaneers' playoff run that resulted in the team winning Super Bowl LV.

On March 25, 2021, Smith signed a two-year, $31.8 million contract extension with the Buccaneers through the 2023 season.

On March 7, 2023, Buccaneers released Smith after eight seasons.

=== Kansas City Chiefs ===
Smith signed with the Kansas City Chiefs on May 4, 2023. In Smith's first and only season with the Chiefs, he helped them win Super Bowl LVIII against the San Francisco 49ers 25–22 to give Smith his second Super Bowl ring.

After not playing in 2024 and 2025, Smith announced his retirement from professional football on April 26, 2026.

=== Regular season ===
Legend
**Bold**	Career high

Year	Team	Games		Offense					
Year	Team	GP	GS	Snaps	Pct	Holding	False start	Decl/Pen	Acpt/Pen
2015	TB	16	16	1,090	**100%**	4	4	2	10
2016	TB	16	16	1,134	**100%**	4	**6**	0	**13**
2017	TB	16	16	1,059	97%	5	2	1	8
2018	TB	16	16	1,115	**100%**	3	2	1	6
2019	TB	15	15	1,056	99%	2	2	**3**	6
2020	TB	15	15	962	96%	5	3	1	10
2021	TB	17	17	**1,148**	97%	3	3	0	7
2022	TB	13	13	907	96%	**7**	4	1	12
2023	KC	9	9	594	98%	4	1	2	5
Career		133	133	9,065	98%	37	27	11	77

== Personal life ==
Smith was raised by his mother, Sharon Smith, and has four siblings. He has three sisters named Ebony, Tamika, and Danielle and has one brother named Dwayne. He studied criminology at Penn State and wants to become a detective or FBI agent in the future. He also enjoys reading, cooking, video games, fishing, and watching standup comedy.

He appeared as a human canvas on the eighth season of Spike TV's Ink Master.
