= Owings Mills Boulevard =

Highway in Maryland, U.S.

- County-maintained segments in purple, state-maintained segment (MD 940) in red

Route information
- Maintained by MDSHA and Baltimore County
- Length: 7.8 mi (12.6 km) MD 940 is 1.48 mi (2.38 km). Two county-maintained portions are 2.3 mi (3.7 km) and 4.0 mi (6.4 km).
- Component highways: MD 940 from Red Run Boulevard to MD 140

Major junctions
- South end: MD 26 in Randallstown
- Red Run Boulevard in Owings Mills; I-795 in Owings Mills; MD 140 in Owings Mills
- North end: Bond Avenue near Glyndon

Location
- Country: United States
- State: Maryland
- Counties: Baltimore

Highway system
- Maryland highway system; Interstate; US; State; Scenic Byways
← MD 939	→ MD 942

Owings Mills Boulevard is a county- and state-maintained highway in the U.S. state of Maryland. The highway runs 7.8 miles (12.6 km) from Liberty Road near Randallstown north to Bond Avenue near Glyndon. Maryland Route 940 (MD 940) is the designation for the 1.48-mile (2.38 km) state highway portion of Owings Mills Boulevard between Red Run Boulevard and MD 140 that is centered on Owings Mills Boulevard's interchange with Interstate 795 (I-795) in Owings Mills in western Baltimore County. Owings Mills Boulevard was first constructed in the mid- to late 1980s. The highway was extended both north and south in the early 1990s and in the early 2000s. Owings Mills Boulevard was extended south in two sections, with the latter section completed to MD 26 in 2016.

== Route description ==
Owings Mills Boulevard begins at MD 26 (Liberty Road) in Randallstown. The highway heads north as a four-lane divided highway through intersections with Winands Road and Lyons Mill Road to Lakeside Boulevard. There, Owings Mills Boulevard expands to six lanes and crosses over Red Run on its way to Red Run Boulevard. Red Run Boulevard leads to the Mill Station lifestyle center (former Owings Mills Mall) and to Painters Mill Road, which provides access to the Owings Mills station of MTA Maryland's Baltimore Metro SubwayLink. At Red Run Boulevard, Owings Mills Boulevard becomes state-maintained as MD 940 and reduces to two through lanes in each direction.

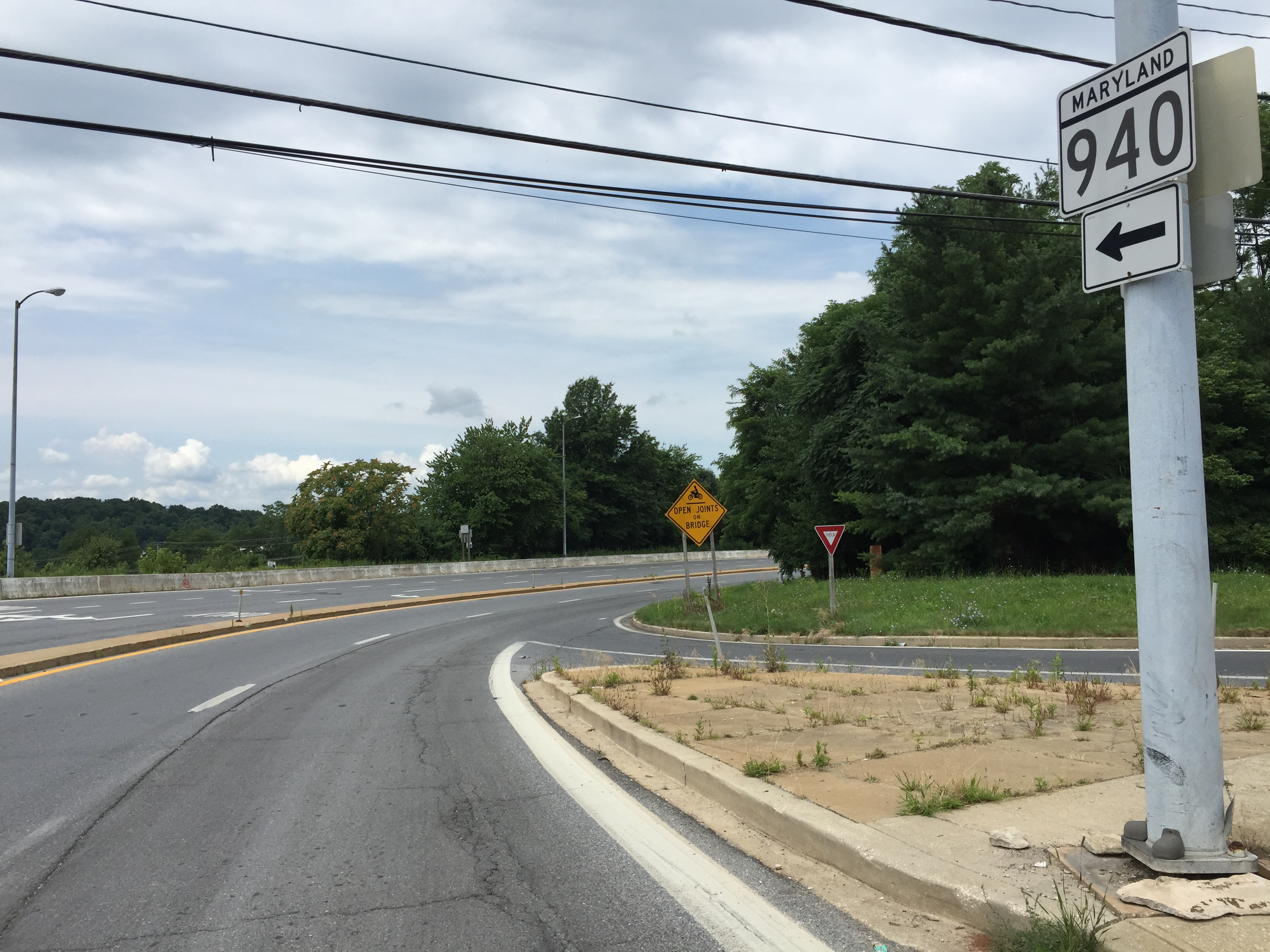
Sign for MD 940 on the road connecting MD 940 to MD 140

Owings Mills Boulevard meets I-795 (Northwest Expressway) at a full interchange that includes fly-over ramps from northbound I-795 to southbound Owings Mills Boulevard and from southbound Owings Mills Boulevard to southbound I-795. The interchange also includes direct ramps from I-795 in the direction of Baltimore for Owings Mills Mall and direct ramps from I-795 in the direction of Reisterstown to the Baltimore Metro Subway station. The first intersection north of I-795 is for Dolfield Road. There is no direct access from the ramp from northbound I-795 to northbound Owings Mills Boulevard to westbound Dolfield Road; that movement requires a U-turn at the following intersection. Owings Mills Boulevard continues onto a bridge over Gwynns Falls and an industrial area paralleling CSX's Hanover Subdivision railroad line. At the north end of the bridge, MD 940 reaches its northern terminus at a one-quadrant interchange from Owings Mills Boulevard to MD 140 (Reisterstown Road). Owings Mills Boulevard continues north as a county highway, crossing over MD 140.

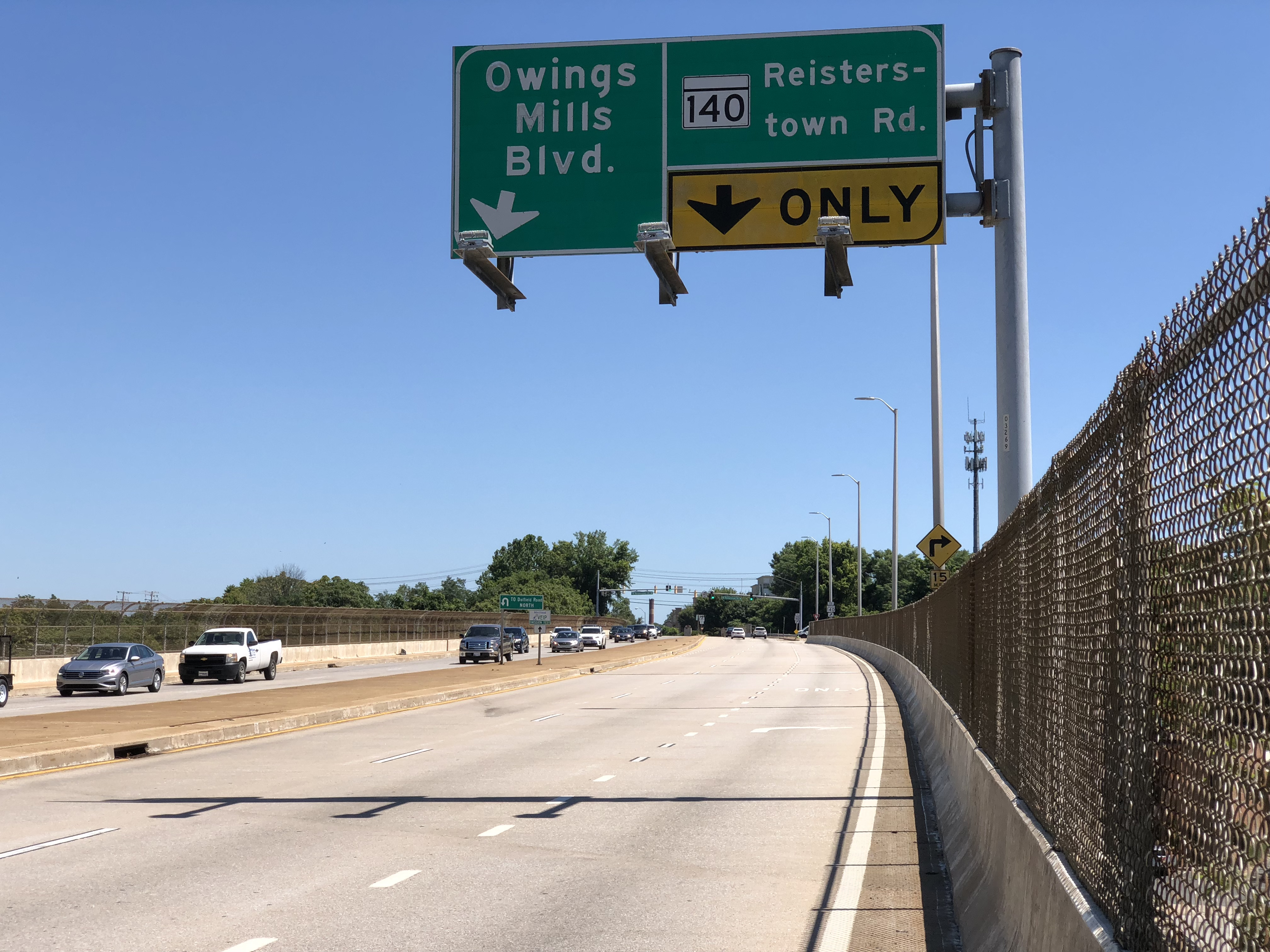
MD 940 northbound at MD 140

Owings Mills Boulevard crosses Gwynns Falls a second time, reduces to a five-lane highway with center turn lane, and passes a shopping center. The highway crosses the creek a third time and then begins to parallel both the creek and the railroad line. Owings Mills Boulevard passes the Owings Mills campus of Stevenson University and intersects Gwynnbrook Avenue and Bonita Avenue before reaching its northern terminus at Bond Avenue. The roadway continues north as two-lane Central Avenue toward MD 128 in Glyndon.

The MD 940 part of Owings Mills Boulevard is a component of a loop of the National Highway System that is an intermodal passenger transport connection between I-795 and the Baltimore Metro SubwayLink station. The loop also includes MD 140 from Owings Mills Boulevard to Painters Mill Road, Painters Mill Road south to Red Run Boulevard, and Red Run Boulevard west to Owings Mills Boulevard.

== History ==
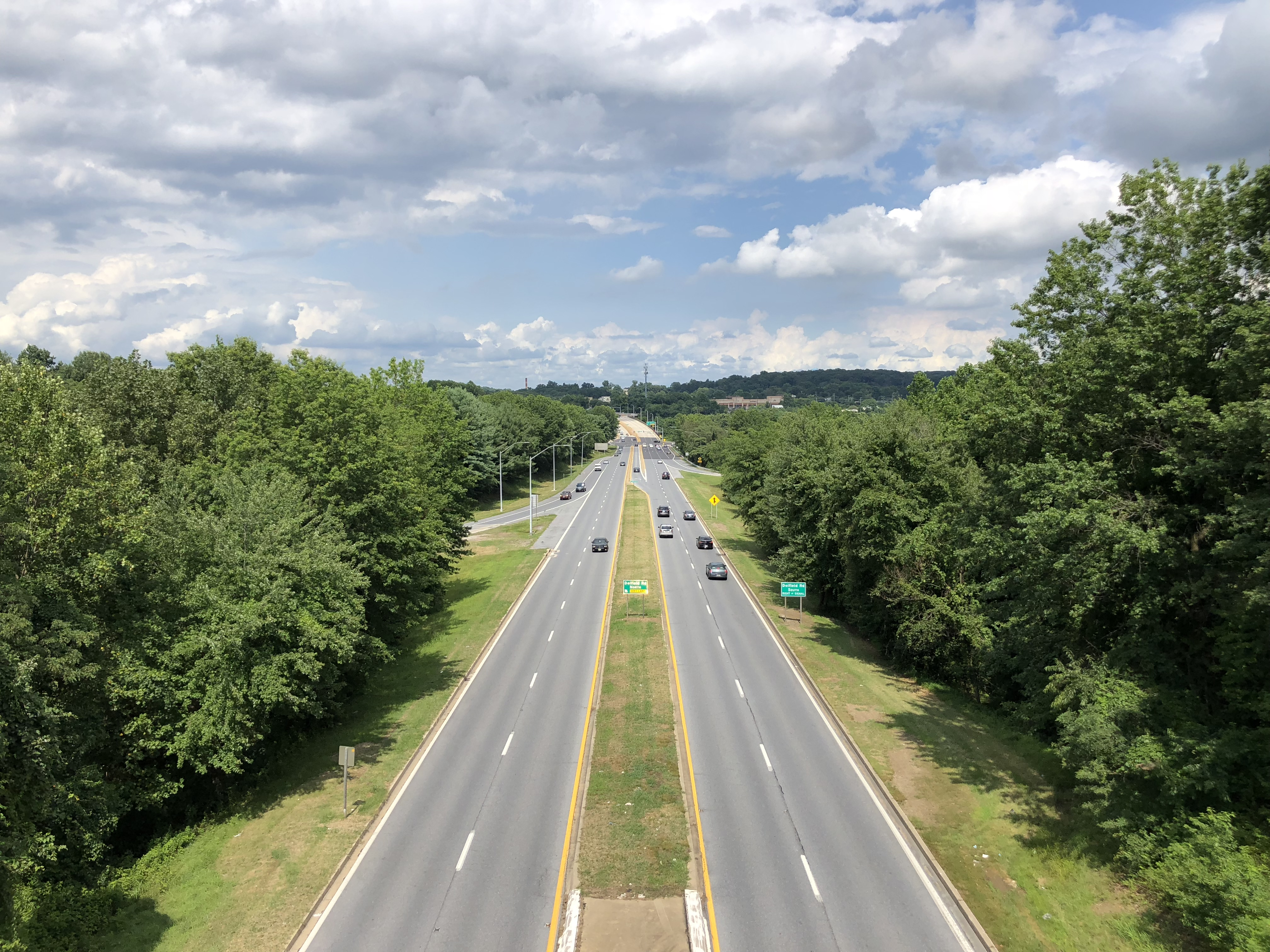
Owings Mills Boulevard northbound viewed from the I-795 interchange in Owings Mills

Owings Mills Boulevard was under construction from Red Run Boulevard to MD 140 by 1985 and completed in 1987; the highway was built contemporaneously with I-795. The completed portion of the boulevard officially became a state highway by 1989. Owings Mills Boulevard was extended as a county highway in both directions in 1991. On the northern end, the highway crossed over MD 140 and took over the course of Bonita Avenue to where Bonita veers away from the railroad. The southern end of the highway was moved to Lakeside Boulevard. Owings Mills Boulevard was extended south to Lyons Mill Road in 2002 and north from Bonita Avenue to Bond Avenue in 2003. Construction on Owings Mills Boulevard's extension south to Winands Road as a four-lane divided highway began in 2010. The portion of the highway between Lyons Mill Road and Winands Road opened August 6, 2012. Construction on the next phase of the highway to MD 26 in Randallstown began in 2013 and opened June 16, 2016.

Owings Mills Boulevard was temporarily co-named Ravens Boulevard in the weeks surrounding Super Bowl XXXV in 2001 to honor the Baltimore Ravens, whose training complex was located at the site of what is now the Owings Mills campus of Stevenson University near Gwynnbrook Avenue. The Ravens moved to their current team facility near Randallstown in 2004.

== Junction list ==
The entire route is in Baltimore County.

Location	mi	km	Destinations	Notes
Randallstown	0.0	0.0	MD 26 (Liberty Road) – Lochearn, Eldersburg	Southern terminus
Owings Mills	2.3	3.7	Red Run Boulevard	Southern terminus of MD 940; county–state maintenance boundary
Owings Mills	3.0	4.8	I-795 (Northwest Expressway) – Baltimore, Reisterstown	I-795 Exit 4
Owings Mills	3.7	6.0	To MD 140 (Reisterstown Road) – Garrison, Reisterstown	Northern terminus of MD 940; one-quadrant interchange; state–county maintenance boundary
Glyndon	7.8	12.6	Bond Avenue / Central Avenue north – Reisterstown	Northern terminus
1.000 mi = 1.609 km; 1.000 km = 0.621 mi
