= Dodge Nature Center =

The Thomas Irvine Dodge Nature Center, founded in 1967, is a nonprofit organization in Minnesota. The center's properties are West St. Paul, Mendota Heights and Cottage Grove and contain nature preserves, community gardens, a working model farm, a nature education-based preschool, a raptor center and a bee aviary. Its revenue streams and program offerings have grown over the years. The center's 40 educational programs serve over 50,000 visitors annually with the help of 1,400 volunteers and approximately 20 paid staff.

== History ==
Olivia Irvine Dodge was a philanthropist who donated the land for Dodge Nature Center and formed the nonprofit which operates it. In the 1970s she invited school programs to the nature center to have gardening plots. Dodge installed a model farm, a greenhouse, and also provided training resources. The center mainly hosted school trips, birding sessions, and nature classes. Dodge said, "We believe in teaching and engendering in our young a love and reverence for nature".

== Nature preserve ==
After Dodge observed that the area around her in West St. Paul was becoming developed, she decided to preserve some of the land for the public. "A nature center seemed, and still does, the wisest way to use the land—save it, respect it, and use it to teach children", she said. Volunteer naturalists were invited starting in 1977 to lead structured training programs for school children. Animals on the preserve have included pigs, sheep, cattle, and horses, many of which were kept on site through old age .

Over the years the center has fostered close cooperation with local schools. In 2013 an additional donation of land in Cottage Grove expanded its facilities, bringing the total amount of land to over 400 acres and eight miles of trails. The center also offers various outdoor summer events at the amphitheater at the West St. Paul location. The Olivia Irvine Dodge Library and History Center was added as part of the organization's 50th-anniversary celebration in 2017.

== Nature Preschool ==
In the late 1990s the center's board of directors decided to create an on-site preschool. The Dodge Nature Center Preschool opened in September 2000 in a three-classroom building designed for that purpose.
