= Caves Valley Historic District =

Historic district in Maryland, United States

- U.S. National Register of Historic Places
- U.S. Historic district
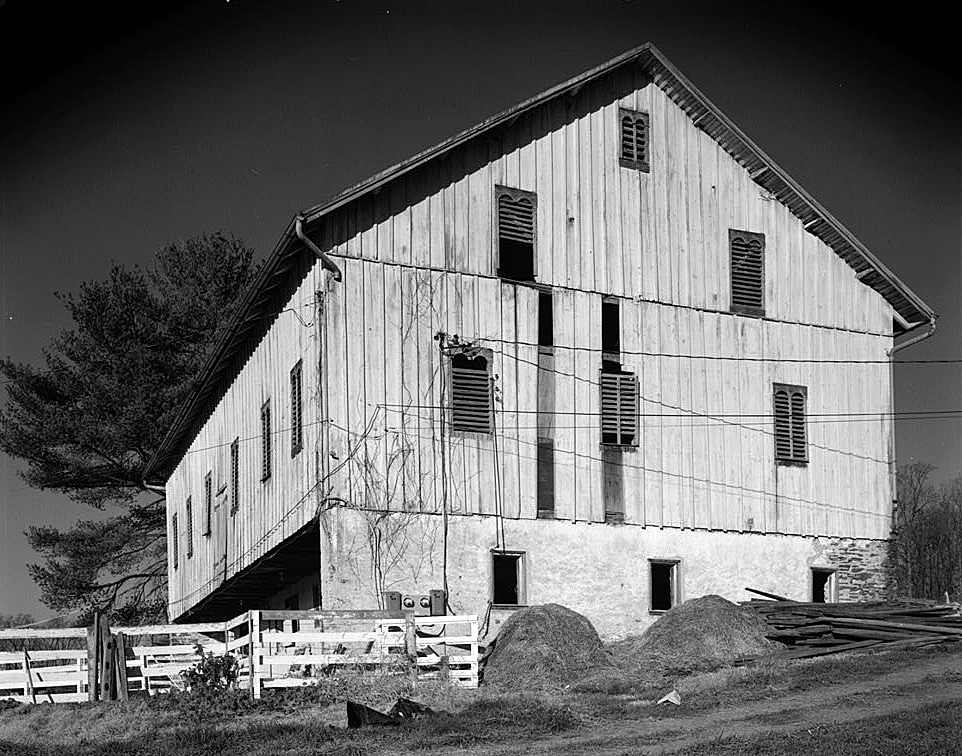
- Blendon Estate barn in 1989

- Location within Maryland Location within the United States
- Nearest city: Owings Mills, Maryland
- Coordinates: 39°26′30″N 76°44′53″W
- Area: 2,100 acres (850 ha)
- Architectural style: Colonial Revival, Georgian, Georgian Revival
- NRHP reference No.: 88001859
- Added to NRHP: October 20, 1988

Caves Valley Historic District is a national historic district near Owings Mills, Baltimore County, Maryland, United States. It is located in a natural upland valley encompassing about 2,100 acres (8.5 km^{2}) along the North Branch of the Jones Falls and its contributing courses. It includes cultivated fields, pastures, woodlands, streams, housing clusters, and agricultural structures. The vernacular buildings are log, stone, and frame, reflecting the local materials and functional plans of rural locations in the 18th and 19th centuries.

It was added to the National Register of Historic Places in 1988.

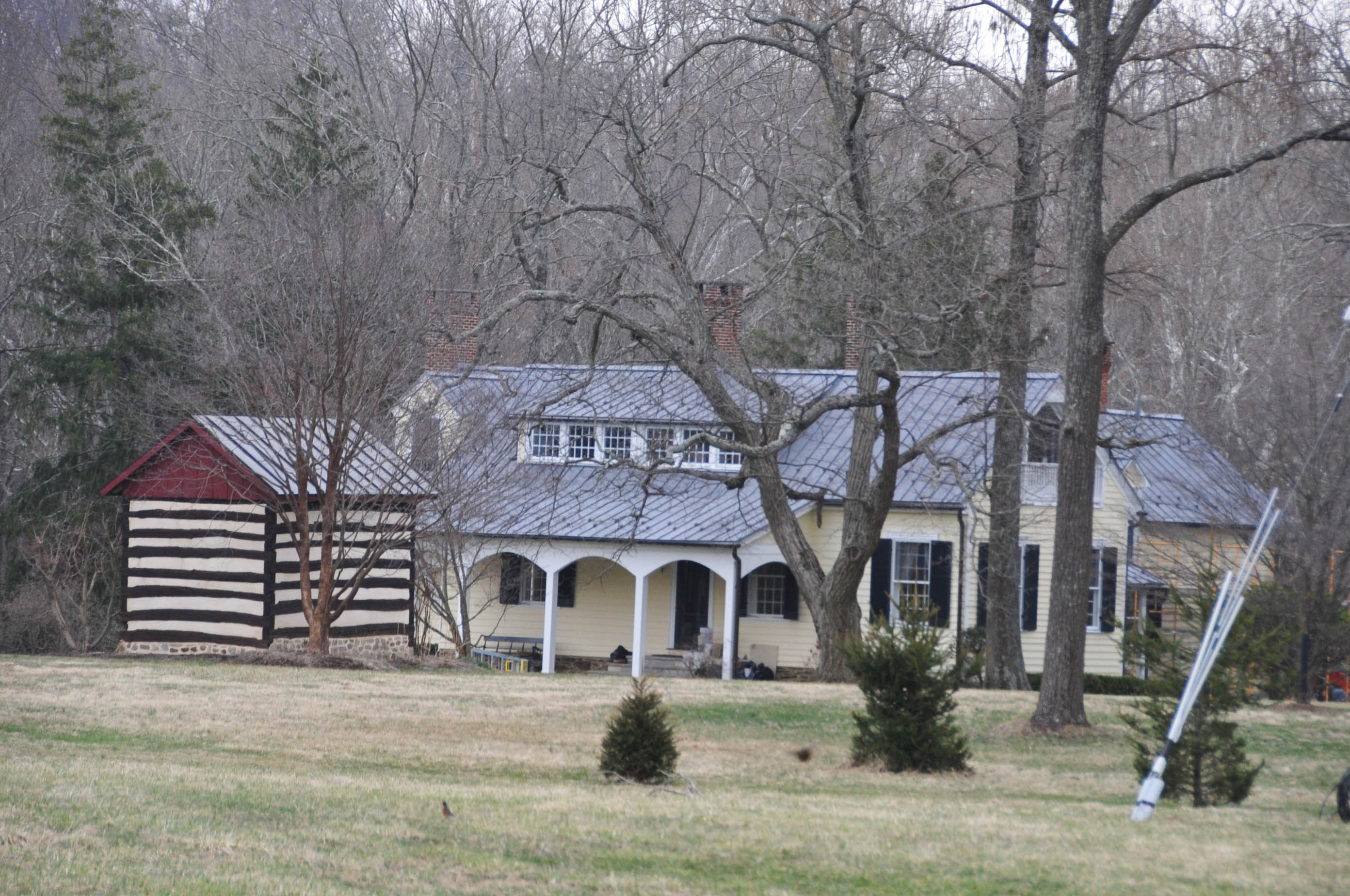
House built with logs, stone and frame sections

The Irvine Nature Center moved from its original location in Stevenson to a property here in 2008.
