= Olivia Irvine Dodge =

Olivia Irvine Dodge (October 7, 1918 – January 24, 2009) was a philanthropist who, along with her sister Clotilde Irvine Moles, donated the house that is now the Minnesota Governor's Residence.

Dodge was a well-known environmentalist, founding the Dodge Nature Center in West St. Paul and Mendota Heights, Minnesota in 1967 and the Irvine Nature Center in Baltimore, Maryland in 1975. In the mid-1960s, Olivia could see the properties around her in West St. Paul being sold for development, and knew the natural environment could be lost. She bought up neighboring properties and then formed the nonprofit Dodge Nature Center to keep it as a resource for the public. The centers teach local schoolchildren about nature and the environment.

Dodge also had a renowned collection of President Franklin D. Roosevelt related material (one of the largest in the country), which she donated to the University of Minnesota in 1975.

In 2017 The Olivia Irvine Dodge Library and History Center was added as part of the Dodge Nature Center's 50th Anniversary celebration. It honors her work as founder of the Dodge Nature Center, and also contains some of her personal mementos and local historic information.

== Dodge Nature Center ==
In 1967, Dodge founded the Dodge Nature Center. The board director is now Sara Beckstrand along with many staff, fellow naturalists, and environmental educators.
