= Interstate 795 (Maryland) =

Highway in Maryland

Interstate 795
- Northwest Expressway
- I-795 highlighted in red

Route information
- Auxiliary route of I-95
- Maintained by MDSHA
- Length: 8.99 mi (14.47 km)
- Existed: 1985–present
- NHS: Entire route

Major junctions
- South end: I-695 in Pikesville
- Owings Mills Boulevard in Owings Mills
- North end: MD 140 in Reisterstown

Location
- Country: United States
- State: Maryland
- Counties: Baltimore

Highway system
- Interstate Highway System; Main; Auxiliary; Suffixed; Business; Future; Maryland highway system; Interstate; US; State; Scenic Byways
| ← MD 794 | → MD 795 |

Interstate 795 (I-795), also known as the Northwest Expressway, is a nine-mile (14 km) auxiliary Interstate Highway linking Baltimore's northwestern suburbs of Pikesville, Owings Mills, and Reisterstown, Maryland, to the Baltimore Beltway (I-695). The route bypasses Maryland Route 140 (MD 140; Reisterstown Road), carrying part of the Maryland Transit Administration (MTA)'s Baltimore Metro SubwayLink in its median for a four-mile (6.4 km) stretch, and provides direct access to the former Owings Mills Mall. It never connects to its parent, I-95, except via I-695.

== Route description ==
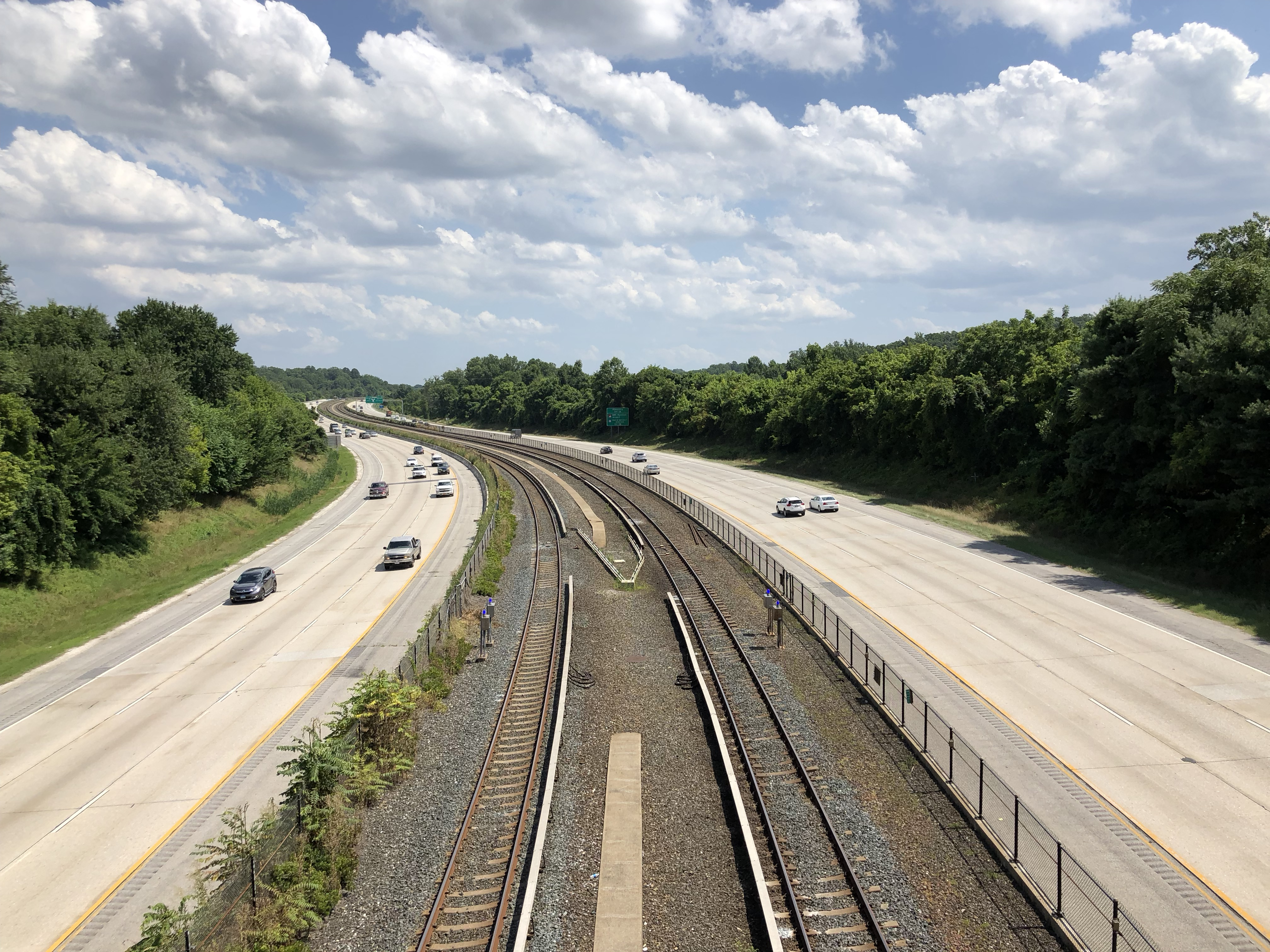
View south along I-795 from McDonogh Road, with the Baltimore Metro SubwayLink tracks in the median

I-795 begins in Pikesville at a directional T interchange with I-695 (Baltimore Beltway), which heads south toward Glen Burnie and east toward Towson. I-695 provides access to I-95 in the directions of Washington, D.C., and Philadelphia to highways into Baltimore. Immediately to the east of the interchange is Old Court station of the MTA's Baltimore Metro SubwayLink, which passes through the interchange and settles into the median of the six-lane freeway as they cross Gwynns Falls. I-795 parallels and has two crossings of CSX Transportation's Hanover Subdivision as the freeway and transit line head northwest. The subway line ends just north of its and the highway's second crossing of Gwynns Falls at the terminal Owings Mills station.

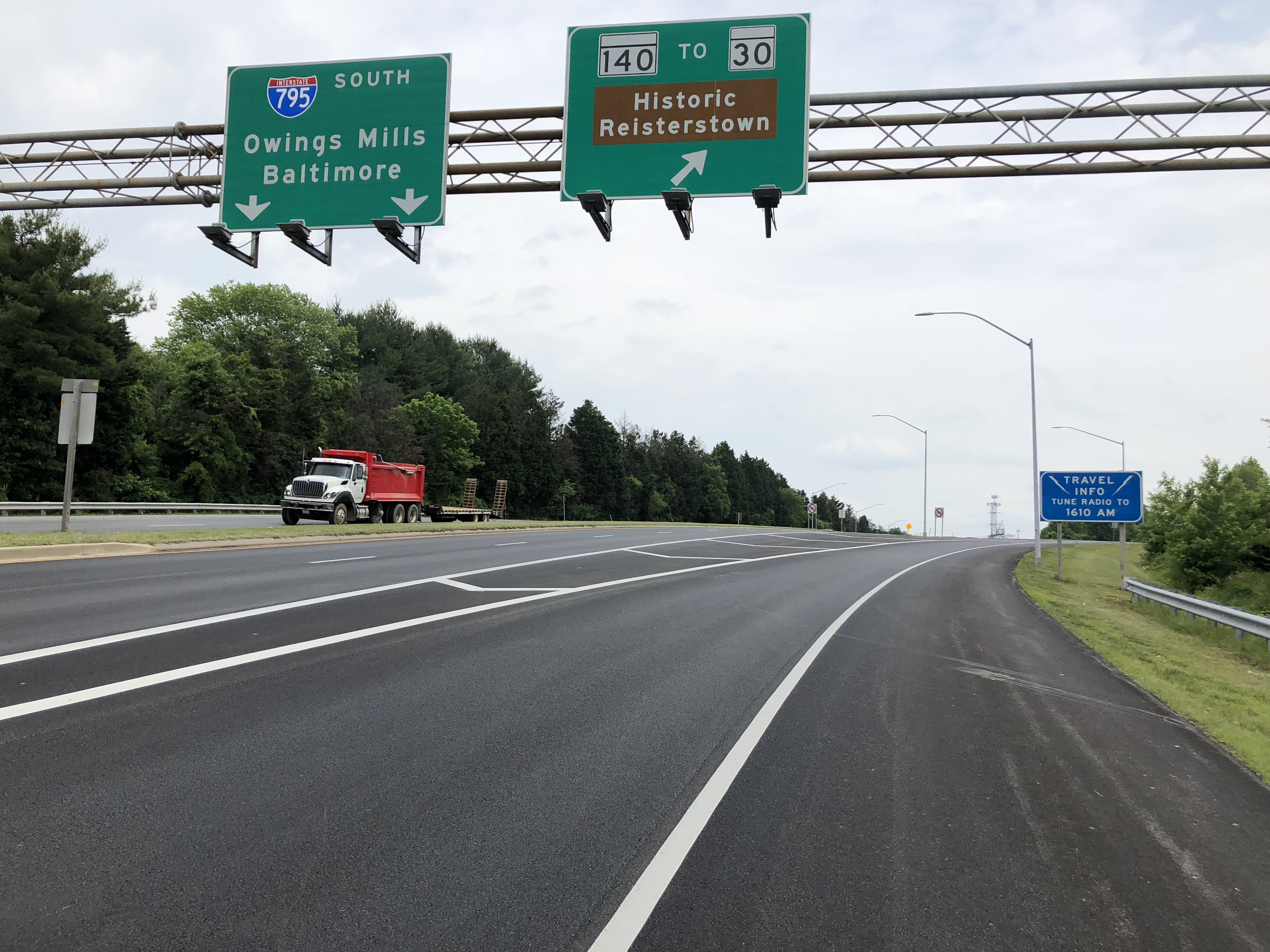
View south at the north end of I-795 at MD 140 in Reisterstown

Immediately to the northwest of the subway terminus is I-795's interchange with Owings Mills Boulevard (unsigned MD 940), which is a partial cloverleaf interchange with flyover ramps from northbound I-795 to southbound Owings Mills Boulevard and from the southbound boulevard to the southbound Interstate. The interchange also features direct ramps with the Metro Centre at Owings Mills to and from the direction of Baltimore and direct ramps with the subway station to and from the direction of Reisterstown. I-795 continues northwest as a four-lane freeway. The highway has a partial cloverleaf interchange with Franklin Boulevard before reaching its northern terminus at MD 140 on the edge of Reisterstown. The terminus consists of direct ramps with MD 140 to and from the direction of Westminster and an intersection with MD 140 (Westminster Pike) and MD 795, an unnamed and unsigned connector between the intersection and an intersection with MD 30 and MD 128 on the north side of Reisterstown.

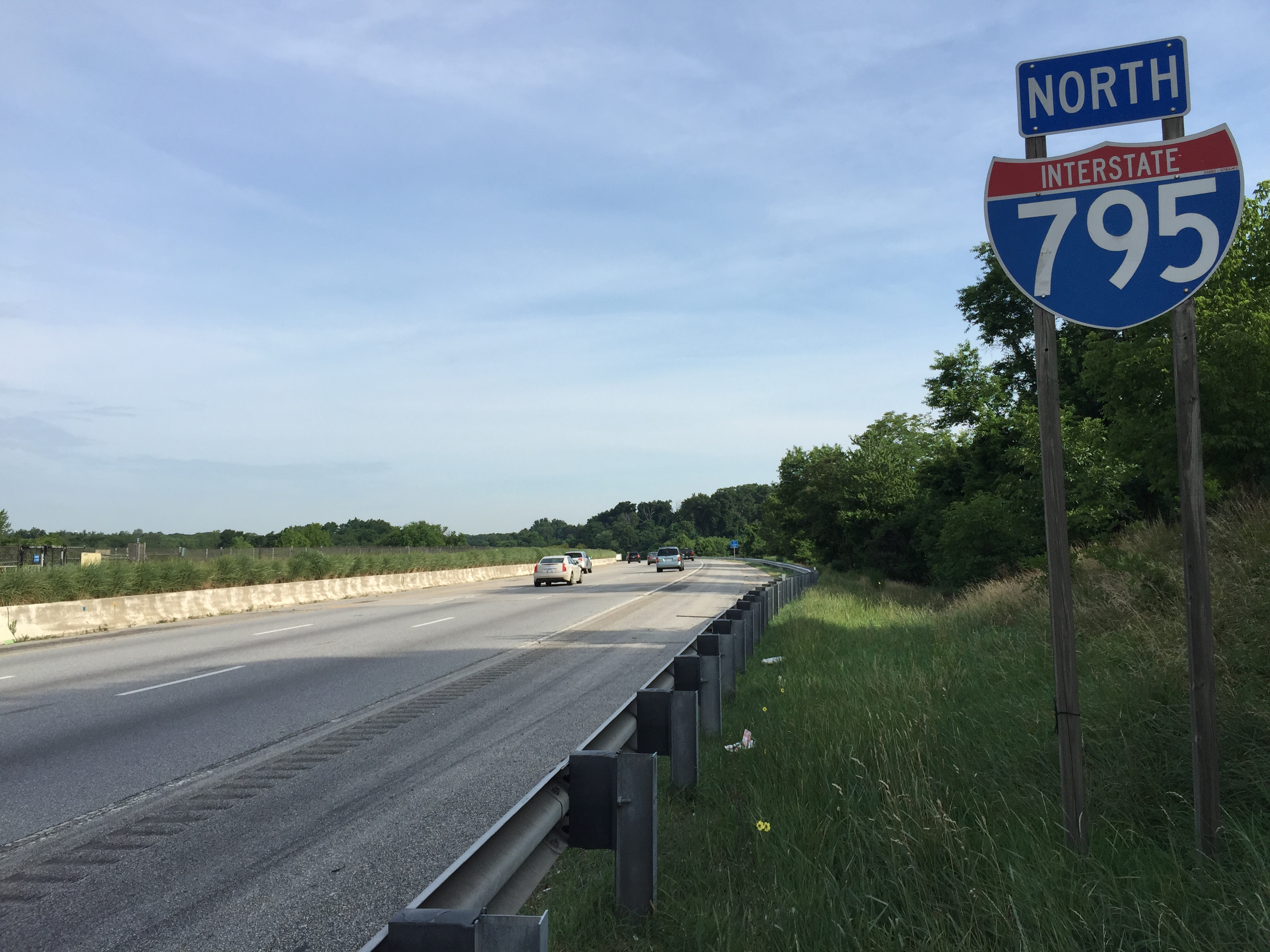
View north from near the south end of I-795 at I-695 in Pikesville

== History ==
The Northwest Expressway was one of the first freeways planned for construction in the state of Maryland. The first four-mile (6.4 km) section to the Owings Mills exit was completed in 1985; the remaining five miles (8.0 km) were completed in 1987.

The original plan was for the highway to run into the city of Baltimore along a similar route to that of the Baltimore Metro SubwayLink. Plans to extend the highway beyond its current configuration have not been sought out by highway officials in Maryland. This alignment would most likely have terminated at the northern terminus of Wabash Avenue (at Patterson Avenue), which parallels the elevated section of the Baltimore Metro SubwayLink.

== Future ==
MDOT SHA plans to construct a diamond interchange at Dolfield Boulevard in the future. The construction of the interchange is to widen that section of I 795 from four to six lanes, relocate Tollgate Road, and construct new sidewalk, bicycle, drainage, stormwater management, and traffic and landscape upgrades. It would also improve access between Red Run Boulevard and I 795. A public open house was held at New Town High School on May 1, 2024.

== Exit list ==
The entire route is in Baltimore County.

| Location | mi | km | Exit | Destinations | Notes |
|---|---|---|---|---|---|
| Pikesville | 0.00 | 0.00 | 1 | I-695 – Glen Burnie, Towson | Signed as exits 1A (east) and 1B (south); also serves Pikesville, BWI Marshall Airport, and Port of Baltimore; exit 19 on I-695 |
| Owings Mills | 3.93 | 6.32 | 4 | Owings Mills Boulevard (MD 940) – Metro | Signed as exits 4A-B southbound; also serves Stevenson University, Owings Mills Town Center, Randallstown |
| | 5.90 | 9.50 | 6 | Dolfield Boulevard | Proposed |
| Reisterstown | 6.55 | 10.54 | 7 | Franklin Boulevard | Signed as exits 7A (east) and 7B (west) northbound |
| Reisterstown | 8.88 | 14.29 | 9A | MD 30 north to MD 140 east – Hanover | Access via unsigned MD 795; also serves Hampstead and Manchester |
| Reisterstown | 8.99 | 14.47 | 9B | MD 140 west – Westminster | Continues west as MD 140 |
1.000 mi = 1.609 km; 1.000 km = 0.621 mi
