= Yahu Blackwell =

Professional boxer and Ghanaian royal (born 1986)

Yahu Blackwell Osuman Lumor of Osu, Accra
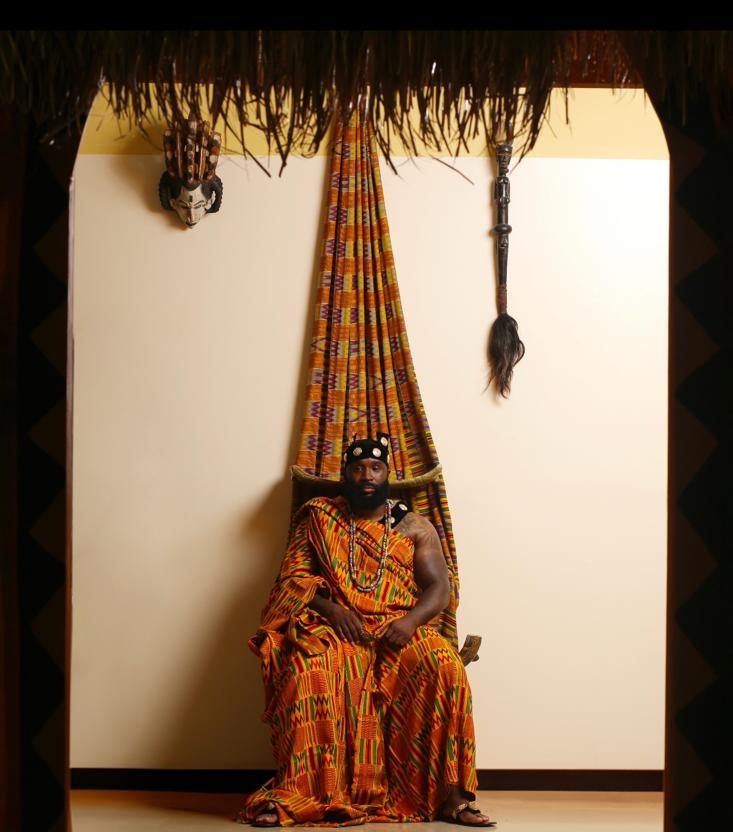

Personal details
- Born: November 22, 1986 (age 39)
- Party: Republican
- Education: Owings Mills High School
- Profession: Boxer and Entrepreneur

Jeroboam Yah Nii Armah Blackwell, (born on November 22, 1986), also known as Yahu Blackwell, is a Ghanaian-American boxer and entrepreneur. He is the first Osuman Lumor of the Ga people of Osu within the Greater Accra Region of Ghana, hailing from the 400-year Osu Ga Dangme African diaspora.

== Early life and education ==
Yahu Blackwell is a descendant of the Gadangme Tribe in Ghana Blackwell's direct lineage traces back to the royal descendants of the “Ankrah” Ga slaves who were taken from the Osu Castle by the Portuguese and the Danish. His ancestors were forcibly transported from Osu Castle in Ghana to Virginia, USA. Ultimately settling in Northumberland County, Virginia, under slave master Joseph Blackwell.

== Career ==
His journey into boxing commenced at the age of 7, where he engaged in 156 amateur bouts, culminating in victory as the South Atlantic champion.

Blackwell began his professional life as a police officer before turning professional in boxing. After being exposed to the sport by Baltimore County policeman Rodney Kenion, he launched himself into the boxing arena, emulating his hero, American boxer Muhammad Ali.

In the International Boxing League, Blackwell is 15–0 with twelve knockouts. Floyd Mayweather Sr, Freddie Roach, Roger Mayweather, Daniel Goodin, Derrick Crisco, Roberta Jalnaiz, and Coach Abel Gustavo are among the trainers he has worked with.

Blackwell in 2022 held the top ranking for the WBC, WBA and WBO heavyweight regional championship

Blackwell has 184 fights in his amateur boxing history. In welterweight competition, he recorded a 156–28 amateur record. In 2009, he was denied his professional debut due to severe dehydration and a broken hands.

In August 2025, Blackwell filed to run as a Republican in the 8th district of the Maryland Senate in the 2026 election, challenging Democratic incumbent Carl W. Jackson.

== Politics ==
In early August 2025, Mr. Blackwell formally entered American politics as he filed to run as a Republican for the District 8 Senate seat in Baltimore County, Maryland.

== Achievements ==
Yahu Blackwell, hails from the Osu enslaved Ayawaso Clans, Ga-Adangbe Tribe in Ghana and the Kikuyu Anjiru Clan in Kenya, has been crowned as Osu Lumor "Divisional King At Large" by His Royal Majesty, HRM Norte Nii Nortey Owuo IV of the Osu Empire.

But after extensive deliberations over the rightful ruler of the Osu throne, on February 11, 2024 it has been concluded that Yahu Blackwell divisional stool will be installed under the perpetual rightful lineal ruler HRM TeTeeTe Nii Nortey Owuo IV.

He was enstooled as the first lineal development king in Osu by His Royal Majesty to HRM TeTeeTe Nii Nortey Owuo IV of the Osu Empire.

== Personal life ==
Yahu Blackwell and Cindy Leta Adio, who hails from the Ewe and Asante tribes, have a son named Ramses Nii Armah Blackwell.

He was enstooled as a lineal development king in Osu in 2024 by His Royal Majesty (HRM) TeTeeTe Nii Nortey Owuo IV of the Osu Empire.This happened May 4, 2024 when Nii Saban Atsen VII played a vital role in the historic moment with Osu Wurlomo Klottey, in the crowning of the first Osu GaDangme American, His Majesty Jeroboam Yah Nii Armah Blackwell, also known as Yahu Blackwell, as Osu Noryaa Mantse.
