= Irvine Nature Center =

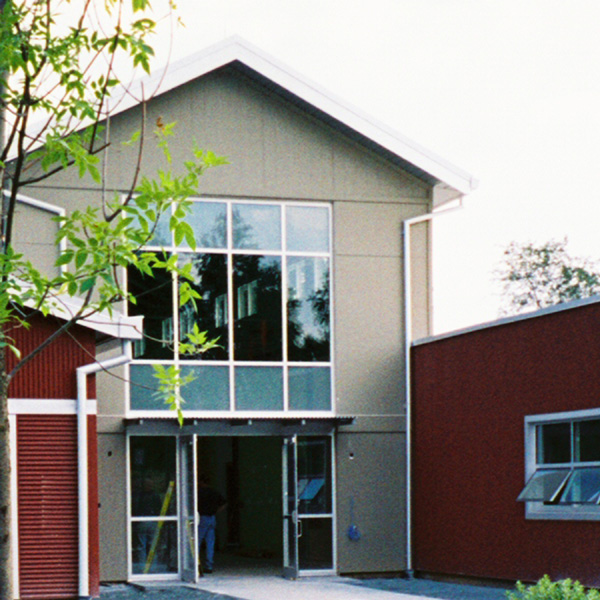
- Interactive map of Irvine Nature Center
- Type: nature center
- Location: 11201 Garrison Forest Road; Owings Mills, Maryland
- Coordinates: 39°25′59″N 76°45′46″W
- Area: 210 acres (0.85 km^{2})
- Created: 1975
- Founder: Olivia Irvine Dodge
- Hiking trails: 6 miles (9.7 km)
- Website: explorenature.org

Irvine Nature Center is a nature center in Owings Mills, Maryland. The center, which is set on 210 acres (0.85 km^{2}) of land in the Caves Valley Historic District, includes a 17,200-square-foot (1,600 m^{2}) green exhibit hall, classrooms, outdoor classroom, a Native American Education site, amphitheater and 8+ miles trails. Irvine is home to the Nature Preschool and Earth Friends Homeschool. Irvine has 80,000 visitors a year.

The center is renowned for holding green weddings. There are also family nature programs, summer camps and the Nature Preschool. Irvine is one of the first in the country to hold a Nature Preschool Conference for educators looking to add nature to their education to the 3-5 year old set.

== History ==
Irvine Nature Center was founded by Olivia Irvine Dodge in 1975 in an old barn on the grounds of St. Timothy's School in Stevenson, Maryland. Its purpose was to teach children about the vulnerability of the planet.

Today, Irvine is the largest independent, non-profit nature center in the region. Its mission is educate and inspire current and future generations to explore, respect and protect nature.

The center relocated to Owings Mills in 2008, after St. Timothy’s sold part of its property, reducing the space available for Irvine ‘s outdoor programs. The state of Maryland, which had owned the current location, donated it to the center for its use. The land was formerly part of the Rosewood Center. In October 2015, Irvine received a large gift from the Charles T. Bauer Charitable Foundation, which enabled Irvine to purchase an additional 93 acres of neighboring land, now named Bauer Preserve, and brings the total acreage to 210 acres. The current site has a diverse array of Piedmont habitats, including open wetlands, upland forest, meadow, forested wetlands and farmland, and includes also the headwaters of the Jones Falls and Gwynns Falls watersheds.

== Gallery ==
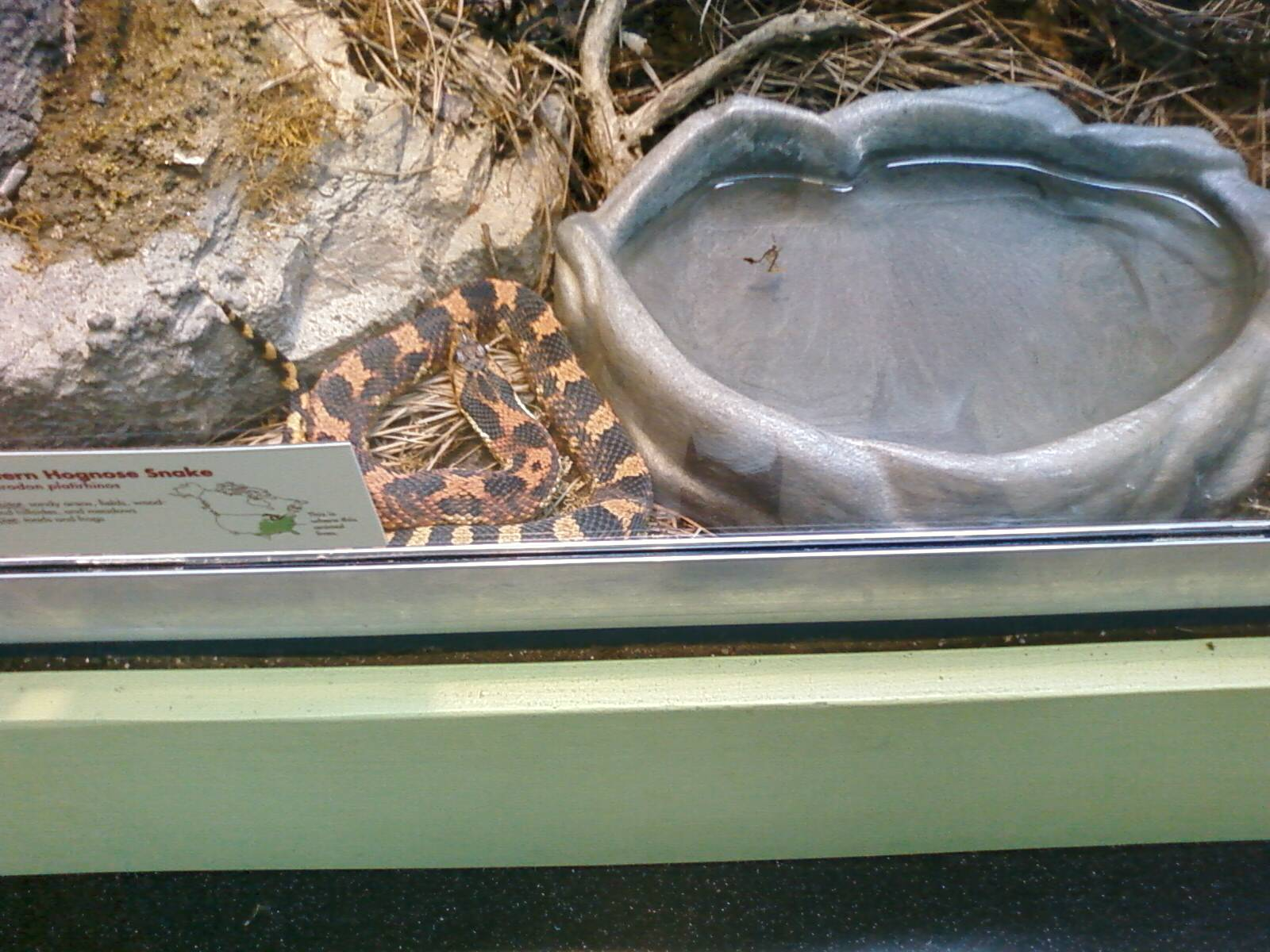
Snake

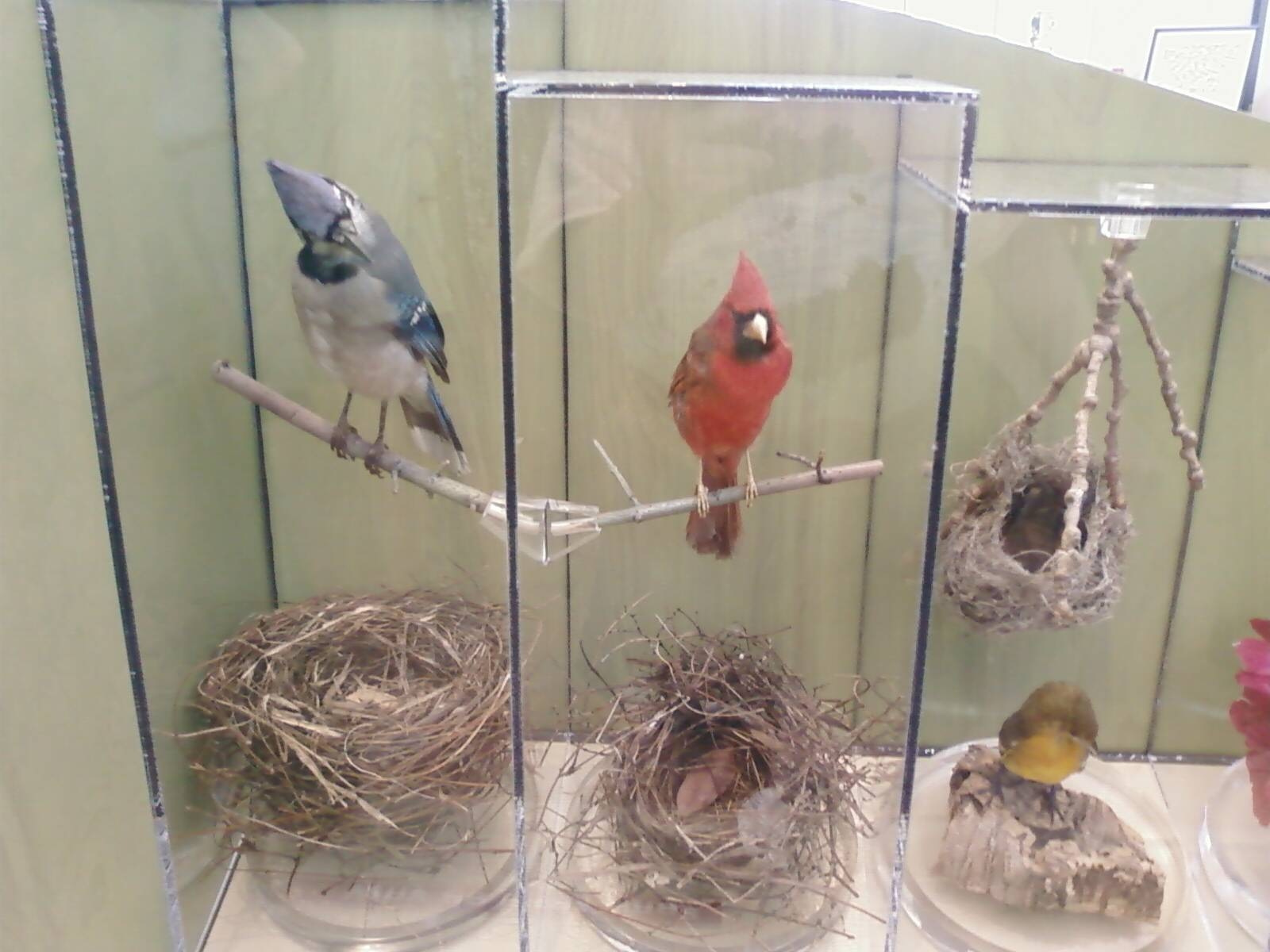
Birds
