= Owings Mills High School =

Location
- 124 Tollgate Road; Owings Mills, Maryland 21117; United States
- Coordinates: 39°25′23″N 76°47′41″W

Information
- Type: Public secondary school
- Established: 1978-1979
- School district: Baltimore County Public Schools
- Grades: 9-12
- Campus size: 37 acres (150,000 m^{2})
- Colors: Brown and gold
- Nickname: Eagles
- Newspaper: Aquila Eye
- Yearbook: Alpha Omega
- Website: owingsmillshs.bcps.org
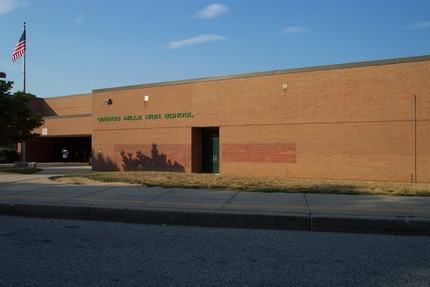
- Owings Mills High School

Owings Mills High School (OMHS) is a four-year public high school in Owings Mills, Maryland, United States. It is part of the Baltimore County Public Schools consolidated school district.

== History ==
Construction for Owings Mills Junior-Senior High School began in 1978. Students were housed temporarily at Pikesville Junior High and Sudbrook Middle School during the construction. Owings Mills opened in February, 1979 as a junior-senior high for grades 7-12. However, during the first year, there was no twelfth grade class. The class of 1980 was the first class to graduate from Owings Mills and the class of 1991 was the last class that attended Owings Mills High from grades 7-12. It became a traditional high school after that year.

== Academics ==
Owings Mills High school received a 42.2 out of a possible 100 points (42%) on the 2018-2019 Maryland State Department of Education Report Card and received a 2 out of 5 star rating, ranking in the 17th percentile among all Maryland schools.

== Students ==
The 2019–2020 enrollment at Owings Mills High School was 1189 students.

== Athletics ==
=== State championships ===
Girls Basketball:

- Class C 1984

Wrestling:

- Group:
  - Class 2A-1A 1991, 1992, 1995, 1996, 2003, 2004, and 2005
  - Class 2A-1A Dual Meet 2002, 2003, 2004, and 2008

== Notable alumni ==
- Majid Khan, Pakistani detainee held at the Guantanamo Bay detention camp
- Donovan Smith, NFL player, Super Bowl LV winner
- Kevin Kadish, Songwriter
- Jasper Pääkkönen, Finnish film actor and entrepreneur
- Yahu Blackwell, Ghana royal and professional Boxer

== See also ==
- List of high schools in Maryland
