= Owings Mills station =

Metro SubwayLink station

Owings Mills
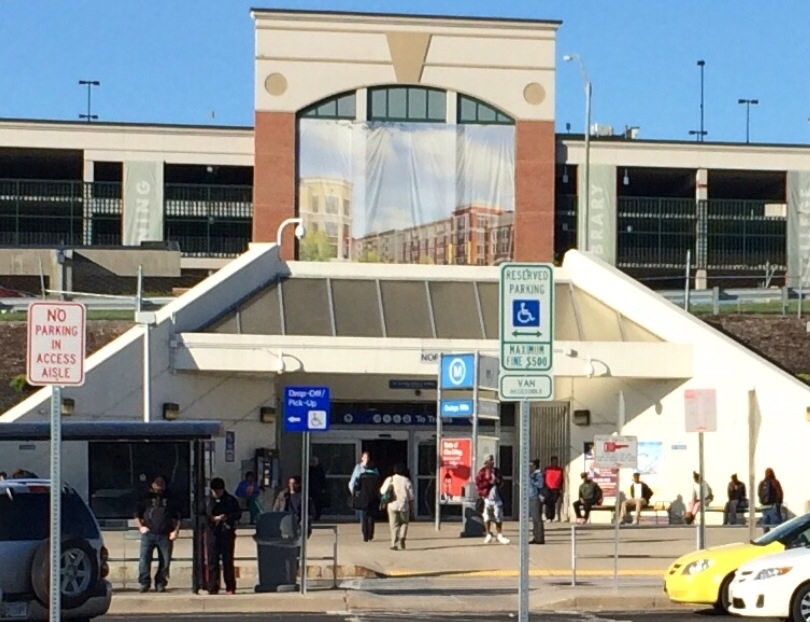
- Northern entrance to the Owings Mills station

General information
- Location: 5018 Painters Mill Road; Owings Mills, Maryland 21117
- Coordinates: 39°24′27″N 76°46′48″W
- Owner: Maryland Transit Administration
- Platforms: 1 island platform
- Tracks: 2

Construction
- Parking: 3500 spaces
- Accessible: Yes

History
- Opened: July 1987

Passengers
- 2017: 3,595 daily

Services
Preceding station	Maryland Transit Administration	Following station
Terminus	Metro SubwayLink	Old Court toward Johns Hopkins Hospital
Location

Owings Mills station is a Metro SubwayLink station in Owings Mills, Maryland. The station is experiencing transit-oriented development from Metro Centre at Owings Mills, bringing many apartments, office space, retail, restaurants, and condominiums to the area adjacent to the station. It has more parking spaces than all other stops along the line. The station is located in the center median of Interstate 795 and is the northern terminus of the line.

The station provides direct connections to both sides of Interstate 795 serving a Parking lot on one side with connections to MTA buses and Metro Centre at Owings Mills on the other side via an underground pedestrian tunnel.

Two buses currently serve this station:

- 87 to Glyndon
- 89 to Reisterstown Plaza

== Construction plans ==
Currently, construction with transit oriented development is in place to build Metro Centre at Owings Mills on some of the ground of the Owings Mills Metro Subway Station that would include shops, hotels, office space, and townhouses. A garage has been built to replace some parking spaces lost due to this project.

== See also ==
- Owings Mills Mall
