= Metro Centre at Owings Mills =

Metro Centre at Owings Mills, previously Owings Mills Town Center, is a partially-completed $220 million transit-oriented development in Owings Mills, Maryland aimed at creating a downtown meeting place on the land between the Owings Mills Metro Station and the former Owings Mills Mall. The complex will include housing, shops, office space, a hotel, a library, and a community college (which would share the same building as the library). In addition, a new garage has been constructed on the Metro station lot to replace some of the parking spaces that the Metro will lose to the town center.

The Town Center project faced a large number of legal hurdles prior to beginning construction. However, construction finally began, and some of the project is already complete. As of early summer 2012, the construction of what is now known as Owings Mills Metro Centre continues, even as lawmakers continue to argue about details of the final project. Two nearby projects have created a potential fight for a limited market, creating a sense for some neighbors that when the project is complete, it may find itself competing with a glut of other available retail space.

In 2004, a developer proposed a mixed-use project next to the Owings Mills Mall. It would have overlooked a lake which was canceled in the 1980s by the Army Corps of Engineers due to environmental concerns. The proposal included a series of mid-rise condominium buildings, office space, and a residential component.

Metro Centre at Owings Mills is a mixed-use Transit-Oriented Development. With commercial office and retail space, residential units, educational facilities, and a full-service hotel, Metro Centre blends the role of shopper, employee, and resident to create a centralized development. Featuring an on-site Metro Station and direct access to all major highways in Metropolitan Baltimore, Metro Centre at Owings Mills is a regional real estate destination that’s connected with all of Baltimore and the Mid-Atlantic.

== Residential ==
As of 2020, two apartment complexes have been completed, Metro Crossing Apartments and The Met at Metro Centre. Over 1,700 total residential units are planned for the site.

== Retail ==
Metro Centre is designed to be a one-stop retail and dining destination for customers to get all their errands done in one place, enjoy a leisurely shopping trip, and grab a bite to eat with quick takeout options or sit-down bars and restaurants. With over 1.2 million people using the Owings Mills Metro Stop, living, working, or passing through the area, this high traffic mixed-use community is an ideal place to set up shop. Metro Centre at Owings Mills offers modern retail and restaurant space that encircles the public square, with additional availability throughout the community. Current tenants include: Subway, Suya Spot, Title Boxing Club, Eggspectation, Club Pilates, and World of Beer.

== Office ==
The first of two proposed 4-story office buildings was completed in 2018. The site will feature a total of 1.2 million square feet of office space.

== Hospitality ==
In 2019, construction began on the Marriott Owings Mills Metro Centre Hotel & Conference Center. The Marriott Owings Mills Metro Centre Hotel & Conference Center will offer 229 luxury rooms in addition to a 6,700 SF Ballroom, 4,150 sf outdoor event terrace, boardroom with connected outdoor terrace, 7 meeting rooms, full-service upscale American restaurant, kosher kitchen, lobby bar & lounge, coffee Shop, upscale fitness center, event hub for conference center, and covered portico entrance.

== Developer ==
David S. Brown Enterprises, LTD., founded in 1933 and headquartered in Owings Mills, MD, is a full-service real estate company providing personalized and innovative development, construction, leasing, sales and management services. The company has developed more than six million square feet of commercial projects and over 2300 residential units throughout Central Maryland and Pennsylvania including Class “A” office buildings, residential communities, parking garages, athletic and student housing facilities, retail strip centers and retail big box stores.
