= Owings Mills, Maryland =

- Census-designated place
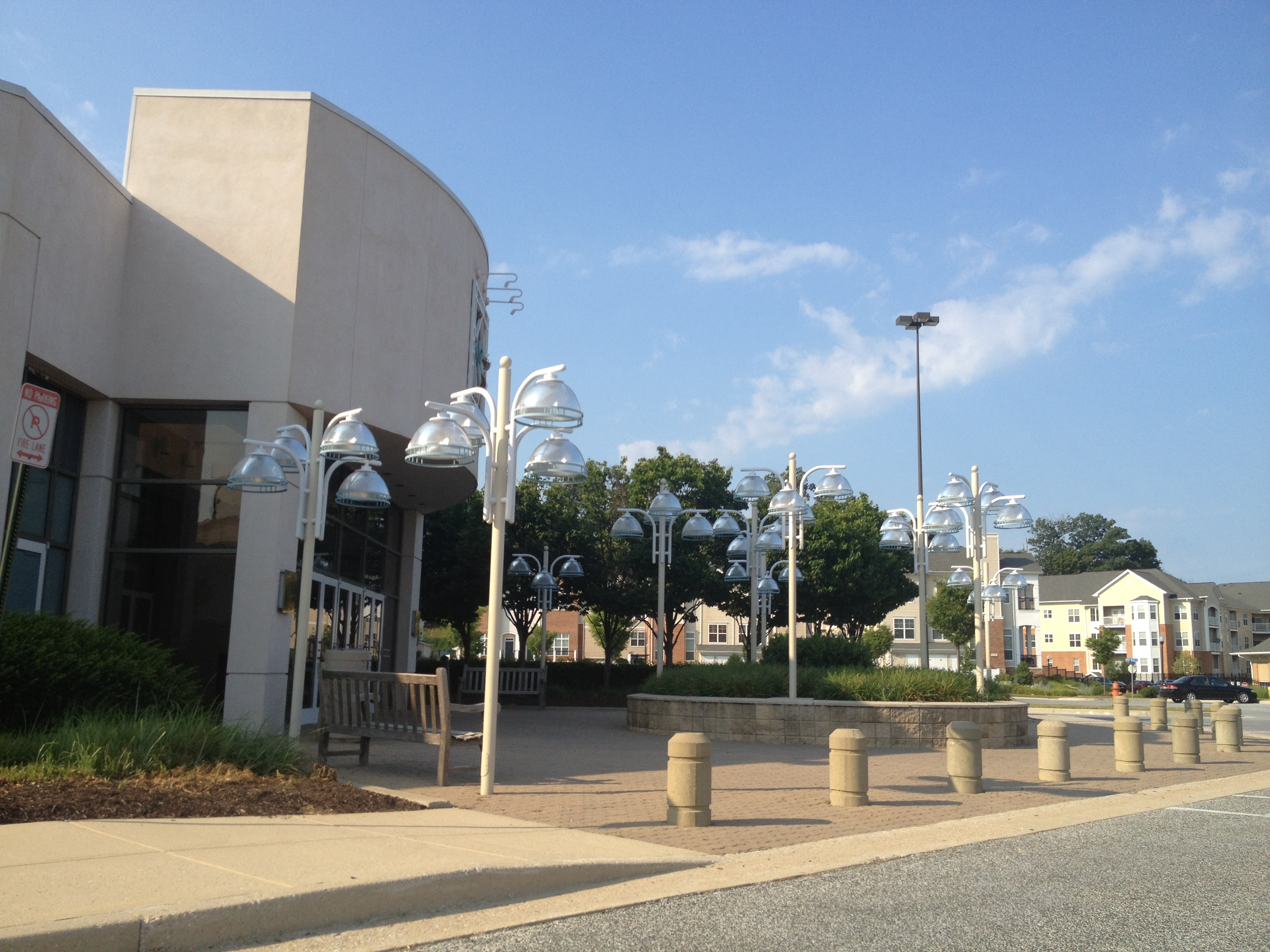
- The main entrance to the Owings Mills Mall in 2012. The mall, developed by the Rouse Co., was demolished in 2017 and the Mill Station open air mall exists in its place.

- Location of Owings Mills, Maryland
- Coordinates: 39°24′44″N 76°47′35″W
- Country: United States
- State: Maryland
- County: Baltimore

Area
  - Total: 9.57 sq mi (24.79 km^{2})
  - Land: 9.53 sq mi (24.69 km^{2})
  - Water: 0.039 sq mi (0.10 km^{2})
- Elevation: 499 ft (152 m)

Population (2020)
  - Total: 35,674
  - Density: 3,742.3/sq mi (1,444.92/km^{2})
- Time zone: UTC−5 (Eastern (EST))
  - Summer (DST): UTC−4 (EDT)
- ZIP Code: 21117
- Area codes: 410, 443, and 667
- FIPS code: 24-59425
- GNIS feature ID: 0586371

Owings Mills is an unincorporated community and census-designated place in Baltimore County, Maryland, United States. It is a suburb of Baltimore. Per the 2020 census, the population was 35,674. Owings Mills is home to the northern terminus of the Baltimore Metro Subway, and housed the Owings Mills Mall until its closure in 2015. It is also home to the Baltimore Ravens' headquarters facility, and the studios for Maryland Public Television. In 2008, CNNMoney.com named Owings Mills number 49 of the "100 Best Places to Live and Launch".

== Geography ==
Owings Mills is located at 39°24′44″N 76°47′35″W (39.412282, −76.793065).

According to the United States Census Bureau, the CDP has a total area of 9.6 square miles (25 km^{2}), all land.

== Geology ==
The Soldiers Delight Natural Environment Area is in the Owings Mills area. It is a serpentinite barren fostering a unique ecosystem as a result of the dissolution of the rock into an easily eroded thin soil. This site and the Bare Hills District have historically been sources of chromium ore, and during the 19th century they were the largest producers of chrome in the world.

== Demographics ==
Historical population
Census	Pop.	Note	%±
1960	3,810		—
1970	7,360		93.2%
1980	9,528		29.5%
1990	9,474		−0.6%
2000	20,193		113.1%
2010	30,622		51.6%
2020	35,674		16.5%
U.S. Decennial Census; 2010 2020

=== Racial and ethnic composition ===
Owens Mills CDP, Maryland – Racial and ethnic composition Note: the US Census treats Hispanic/Latino as an ethnic category. This table excludes Latinos from the racial categories and assigns them to a separate category. Hispanics/Latinos may be of any race.
Race / Ethnicity (NH = Non-Hispanic)	Pop 2000	Pop 2010	Pop 2020	% 2000	% 2010	% 2020
White alone (NH)	10,998	9,754	6,940	54.46%	31.85%	19.45%
Black or African American alone (NH)	7,301	15,374	21,214	36.16%	50.21%	59.47%
Native American or Alaska Native alone (NH)	44	72	49	0.22%	0.24%	0.14%
Asian alone (NH)	789	2,379	2,536	3.91%	7.77%	7.11%
Native Hawaiian or Pacific Islander alone (NH)	7	11	11	0.03%	0.04%	0.03%
Other race alone (NH)	32	86	223	0.16%	0.28%	0.63%
Mixed race or Multiracial (NH)	375	811	1,238	1.86%	2.65%	3.47%
Hispanic or Latino (any race)	647	2,135	3,463	3.20%	6.97%	9.71%
Total	20,193	30,622	35,674	100.00%	100.00%	100.00%

=== 2020 census ===
As of the 2020 census, Owings Mills had a population of 35,674. The median age was 34.5 years. 22.2% of residents were under the age of 18 and 11.8% of residents were 65 years of age or older. For every 100 females there were 81.0 males, and for every 100 females age 18 and over there were 75.7 males age 18 and over.

99.9% of residents lived in urban areas, while 0.1% lived in rural areas.

There were 14,078 households in Owings Mills, of which 32.4% had children under the age of 18 living in them. Of all households, 34.1% were married-couple households, 18.6% were households with a male householder and no spouse or partner present, and 40.6% were households with a female householder and no spouse or partner present. About 32.3% of all households were made up of individuals and 10.3% had someone living alone who was 65 years of age or older.

There were 14,986 housing units, of which 6.1% were vacant. The homeowner vacancy rate was 1.6% and the rental vacancy rate was 7.3%.

Racial composition as of the 2020 census
Race	Number	Percent
White	7,369	20.7%
Black or African American	21,434	60.1%
American Indian and Alaska Native	187	0.5%
Asian	2,542	7.1%
Native Hawaiian and Other Pacific Islander	11	0.0%
Some other race	1,967	5.5%
Two or more races	2,164	6.1%
Hispanic or Latino (of any race)	3,463	9.7%

=== 2010 census ===
As of the census of 2010, there were 30,622 people and 12,525 households in the CDP. The population density was 3,189.8 inhabitants per square mile (1,231.6/km^{2}). There were 13,282 housing units, at an average density of 1,383.5 per square mile (534.2/km^{2}). The racial makeup of the CDP was 34.3% White, 51.0% African American, 0.3% Native American, 7.8% Asian, 0.1% Native Hawaiian or other Pacific Islander, 3.3% some other race, and 3.3% from two or more races. Hispanic or Latino of any race were 7.0% of the population.

There were 12,525 households, out of which 29.0% had children under the age of 18 living with them, 37.5% were headed by married couples living together, 16.1% had a female householder with no husband present, and 42.1% were non-families. Of all households 33.2% were made up of individuals, and 7.1% were someone living alone who was 65 years of age or older. The average household size was 2.34, and the average family size was 3.01.

In the CDP, the population was spread out, with 21.9% under the age of 18, 12.5% from 18 to 24, 35.7% from 25 to 44, 22.0% from 45 to 64, and 8.0% who were 65 years of age or older. The median age was 32.6 years. For every 100 females, there were 81.6 males. For every 100 females age 18 and over, there were 77.2 males.

=== 2000 census ===
At the 2000 census, the median income for a household in the CDP was $53,424, and the median income for a family was $61,079. Males had a median income of $41,135 versus $33,359 for females. The per capita income for the CDP was $27,107. About 4.6% of families and 5.9% of the population were below the poverty line, including 6.8% of those under age 18 and 9.2% of those age 65 or over.

== Education ==
Owings Mills is served by the Baltimore County Public Schools system. Schools include New Town Elementary, Owings Mills Elementary, Lyons Mill Elementary, Timber Grove Elementary in adjacent Reisterstown, Glyndon Elementary, Deer Park Middle Magnet, Owings Mills High, and New Town High. There are also several private schools in the area, including McDonogh School, a Pre-K–12 school and Garrison Forest School, also a Pre-K–12 school. McDonogh School is co-ed while Garrison Forest is all girls.

Owings Mills is home to a satellite branch of the three campuses of the Community College of Baltimore County system (CCBC) (Dundalk, Essex and Catonsville) and a branch of the ITT Technical Institute. Stevenson University (formerly Villa Julie College), opened its Owings Mills campus in 2004, an addition to its original Stevenson campus nearby to the east.

== Transportation ==
=== Roads ===
Some of the major roads in the Owings Mills area are:

- Bonita Avenue
- Caves Road
- Dolfield Road
- Garrison Forest Road (MD-129 on most northern block)
- Greenspring Avenue (formerly MD-519)
- Gwynnbrook Avenue
- Greenspring Valley Road (MD-130)
- Lakeside Boulevard
- Lyons Mill Road
- Marriottsville Road
- McDonogh Road
- Northwest Expressway (I-795)
- Owings Mills Boulevard (MD-940 near I-795 interchange)
- Reisterstown Road (MD-140)
- Painters Mill Road
- Park Heights Avenue (MD-129)
- Red Run Boulevard
- Rosewood Lane

=== Public transportation ===
Owings Mills station, the northwestern terminus of the Baltimore Metro Subway, is on Painters Mill Road, very close to the former mall. There is also public bus service available on Maryland Transit Administration bus route nos. 87 and 89. Both routes operate on Painters Mill Road, to the mall and the Metro, and on different portions of Reisterstown Road.

== Attractions and facilities ==
Owings Mills is home to approximately a dozen major shopping centers and numerous office buildings. In the center of Owings Mills was Owings Mills Mall, an enclosed shopping mall. The mall, which opened in 1986, once featured more than 150 stores. The mall closed in 2015, and was completely demolished in March 2017. The former mall has since been redeveloped into Mill Station, which is a 620,000 sq ft retail development. The first retailer to open its doors in the new Mill Station was Costco, who hosted their ribbon cutting ceremony in October 2018. It is also within walking distance to the Metro Centre, which holds the northern most stop on the Baltimore Metro, along with restaurants and shopping.

Many nationally known organizations and businesses call Owings Mills home, including CareFirst, T. Rowe Price, Lion Brothers, The Baltimore Life Companies, Talbot Settlement & Escrow, Black & Decker, the Baltimore Ravens headquarters facility, and Maryland Public Television studios (formerly the Maryland Center for Public Broadcasting). A large manufacturing complex dates to 1926 as the site of Maryland Baking Company, and then starting in 1957 housed Maryland Cup (see Sweetheart Cup Company), the Fort Howard Paper Corporation (see Georgia-Pacific), and finally the Solo Cup Company, which closed the plant in 2011. In 2015, the property started redevelopment into a shopping complex, Foundry Row. The first store to open in Foundry Row was Wegmans, which launched in September 2016.

The Irvine Nature Center moved to a property here, in the Caves Valley Historic District, in 2008.

The abandoned Rosewood Center, a former asylum for people with mental disabilities, is in Owings Mills. It was shut down in 2010 due to numerous issues, including lead and asbestos contamination, and lack of equipment inventory. It was used as a training location for the Maryland state police until 2013, when a police officer in training was shot and killed on the location during training. Stevenson University acquired Rosewood in 2017 and finalized an agreement with the State of Maryland in September 2020 for the redevelopment of the site for their addition to the campus, to be known as Owings Mills East. The development is expected to take 18 months, and as of December 2020 has been continuing as scheduled despite the COVID-19 pandemic. It completed construction in 2022 and opened in the fall "as an athletic and recreational hub providing space for the expansion of Stevenson's current facilities."

== In media and popular culture ==
- The TV program Wall $treet Week with Louis Rukeyser was produced by Maryland Public Television at its studios in Owings Mills during its original run from 1972 to 2005; many viewers became familiar with the town as the program's mailing address. Others became familiar with it as the mailing address of the still-running weekly automotive series MotorWeek since 1981. Local roads can often be seen on the program.
- Rosewood Center is the location for the film The Institute.

== Notable people ==
- Nia Clouden (born 2000), WNBA player
- Sean Tucker (born 2001), NFL player

== See also ==
- On Nature's Trail
