= Maryland Route 129 =

State highway in Maryland, US

Maryland Route 129
- Maryland Route 129 highlighted in red

Route information
- Maintained by MDSHA and Baltimore DOT
- Length: 15.43 mi (24.83 km)
- Existed: 1927–present

Major junctions
- South end: US 40 / MD 295 in Baltimore
- US 1 / US 40 Truck in Baltimore; MD 140 in Baltimore; MD 133 in Pikesville; I-695 in Pikesville; MD 130 near Stevenson
- North end: Garrison Forest Road near Reisterstown

Location
- Country: United States
- State: Maryland
- Counties: City of Baltimore, Baltimore

Highway system
- Maryland highway system; Interstate; US; State; Scenic Byways
← MD 128	→ MD 130

Maryland Route 129 (MD 129) is a state highway in the U.S. state of Maryland, running north-northwesterly from U.S. Route 40 (US 40) and MD 295 in the city of Baltimore into Baltimore County, ending at Garrison Forest Road east of Reisterstown. The route leaves downtown on the one-way pair of McCulloh Street and Druid Hill Avenue, and then uses the entire length of Park Heights Avenue to the end. MD 129 connects Downtown Baltimore with Druid Hill Park using McCulloh Street and Druid Hill Avenue. As Park Heights Avenue, the state highway is one of two primary radial routes (with MD 140) in the northwestern part of the city, providing access to The Maryland Zoo and Pimlico Race Course. In Baltimore County, MD 129 passes through Pikesville, where it has a junction with Interstate 695 (I-695) and serves an affluent rural area north of Pikesville and east of Reisterstown.

== Route description ==
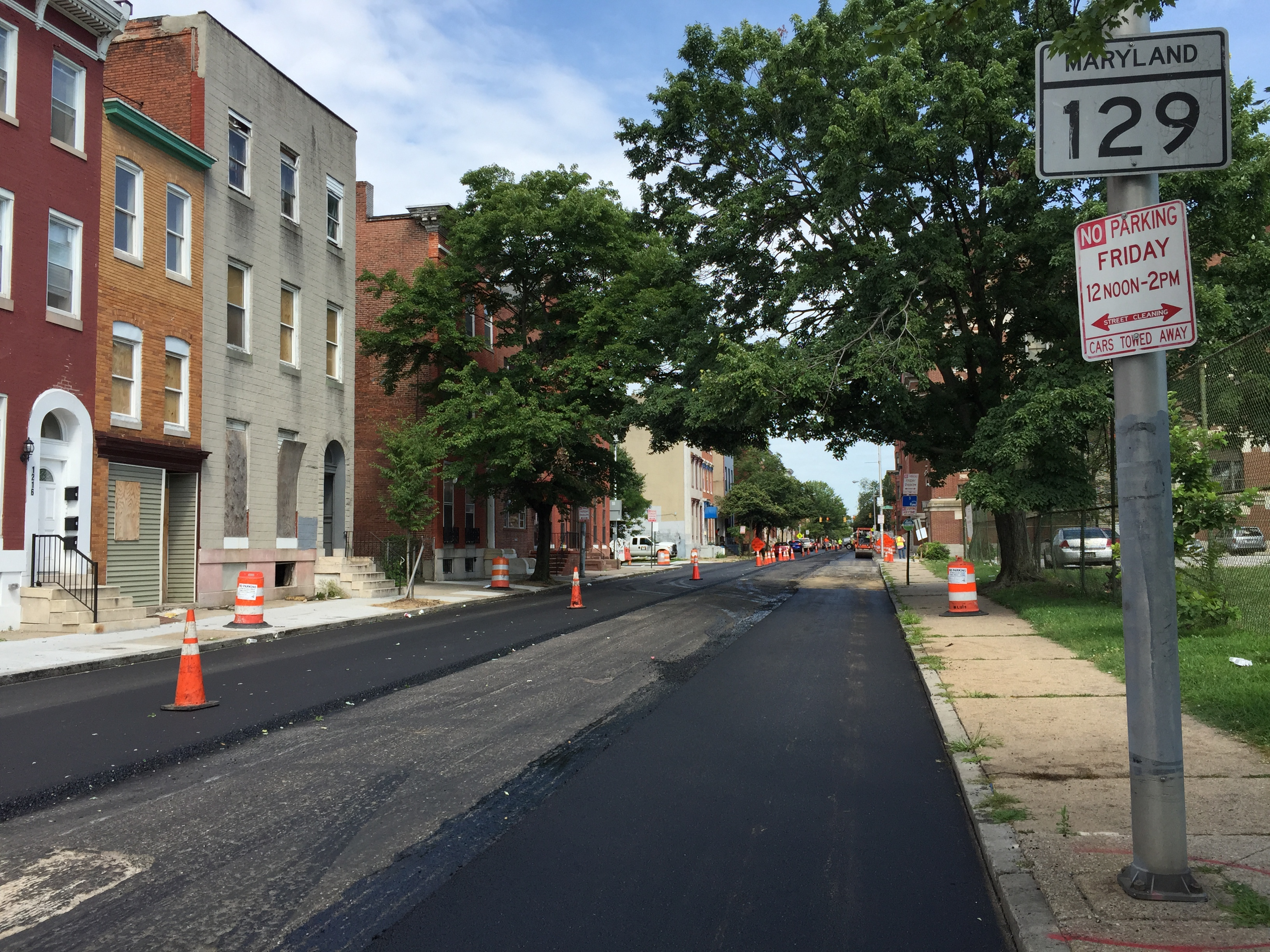
View north along MD 129 (McCulloh Street) in Baltimore

MD 129 begins at Franklin Street, the westbound direction of US 40, in the Seton Hill neighborhood of Baltimore. Both routes are one-way pairs: MD 129 begins northbound as Paca Street and ends southbound as Pennsylvania Avenue; the eastbound US 40 follows Mulberry Street one block to the south. Paca Street and Greene Street, the southern continuation of Pennsylvania Avenue, continue south as MD 295. MD 129 passes along the edges of the pentagonal block that contains St. Mary's Park, St. Mary's Seminary Chapel, and the Mother Seton House, which along with nearby Orchard Street United Methodist Church lie within the Seton Hill Historic District. North of St. Mary's Park, northbound MD 129 veers northwest onto McCulloh Street and southbound MD 129 makes its way from McCulloh Street's partner to the west, Druid Hill Avenue, to Pennsylvania Avenue via either St. Mary Street, a one-way street in the wrong direction which follows the northwest side of St. Mary's Park, or Martin Luther King Jr. Boulevard, which both McCulloh Street and Druid Hill Avenue intersect two blocks to the northwest.

The one-way pair of MD 129 passes between the Upton neighborhood to the southwest and Madison Park to the northeast. The northbound direction passes southwest of Renaissance Academy at Lafayette Street. Both streets pass through Druid Heights, where they intersect North Avenue, which carries US 1 and US 40 Truck. MD 129's constituent streets pass between the Reservoir Hill neighborhood to the northeast and Penn–North to the southwest. McCulloh Street and Druid Hill Avenue come together as a divided highway called Auchentoroly Terrace (also known as Swann Drive) at Druid Park Lake Drive, where MD 129 starts to follow the southwestern edge of Druid Hill Park and the northeastern edge of the Woodbrook neighborhood. Northbound MD 129 has three to five lanes while the southbound direction has three travel lanes. The boulevard passes the Howard Peters Rawlings Conservatory and Botanic Gardens of Baltimore then intersects Liberty Heights Avenue, which becomes MD 26 west of MD 140, and Greenspring Avenue, which enters the park and provides access to The Maryland Zoo. One block north of that intersection, MD 129 meets MD 140 (Reisterstown Road) at an oblique directional intersection that prevents direct access from northbound MD 129 to southbound MD 140 and from northbound MD 140 to southbound MD 129, movements which are provided via Liberty Heights Avenue.

MD 129 and MD 140 follow eight-lane divided Reisterstown Road for three blocks between Druid Hill Park and the Liberty Square neighborhood to the west. At Druid Park Drive, the two routes diverge, with MD 129 heading north onto six-lane divided Park Heights Avenue. MD 129 and MD 140 parallel each other one block apart through the Park Circle neighborhood, site of the Park Circle Historic District, and into Central Park Heights, where the two routes intersect Cold Spring Lane and then veer away from each other. Park Heights Avenue becomes a four-lane undivided highway shortly before Belvedere Avenue, where the highway passes the western edge of Pimlico Race Course, the site of the Preakness Stakes. MD 129 passes between the Pimlico neighborhood to the northeast and Arlington to the southwest, then intersects Northern Parkway. The state highway passes through the affluent Glen neighborhood and between the heavily Jewish neighborhoods of Cross Country to the northeast and Fallstaff to the southwest before intersecting Slade Avenue at the northwest corner of the city of Baltimore, just north of Temple Oheb Shalom.

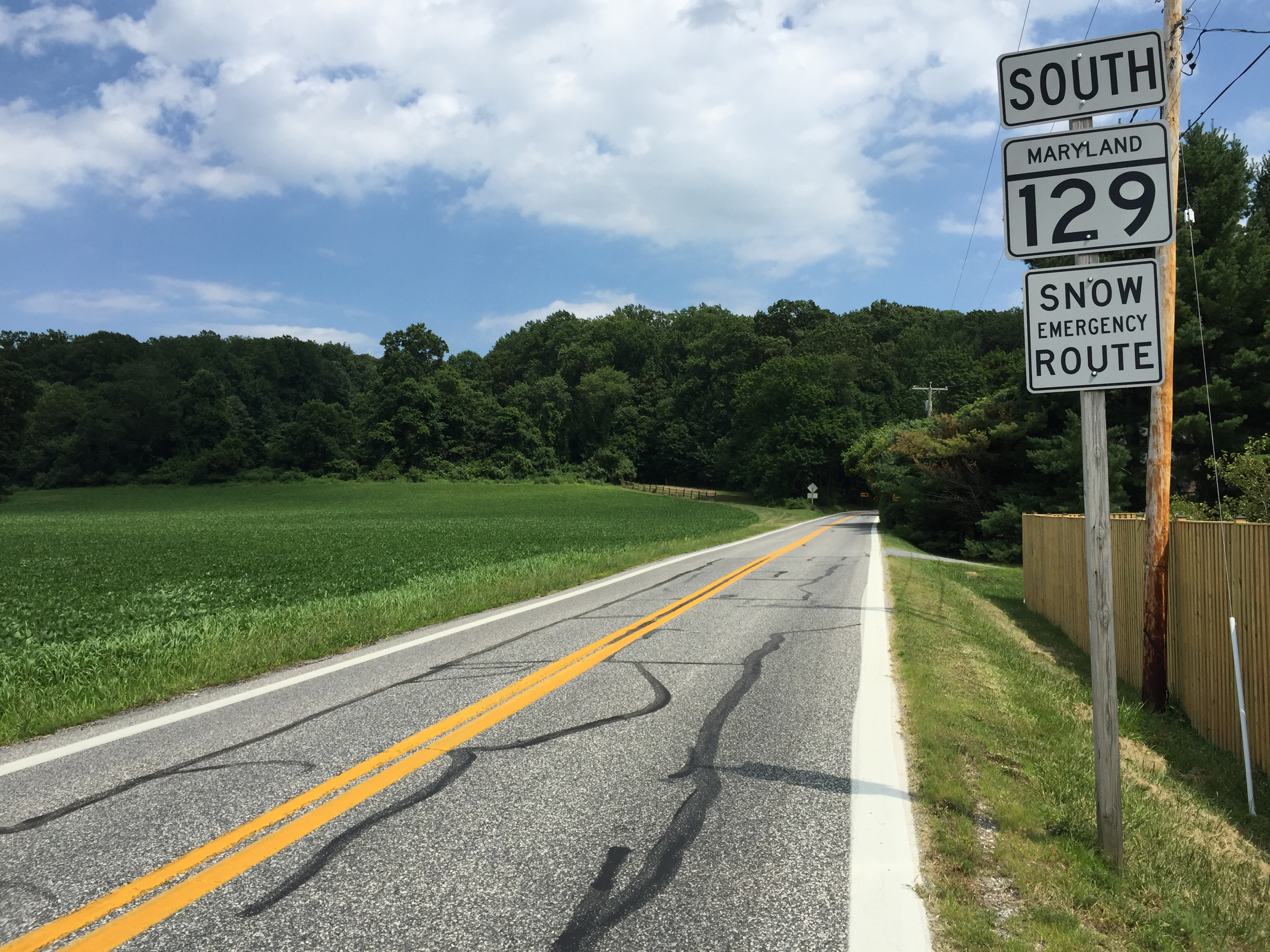
MD 129 southbound past its northern terminus at Garrison Forest Road in Worthington

Once in Baltimore County, MD 129 veers north, reduces to two lanes, and passes between the Suburban Park Golf Course to the west and the Dumbarton Historic District on the east. At the north end of both complexes, the state highway intersects Old Court Road, which heads east as MD 133. MD 129 passes Druid Ridge Cemetery before temporarily expanding to a four-lane divided highway for its half-diamond interchange with I-695 (Baltimore Beltway). The east leg of the intersection with the exit ramp from eastbound I-695 is Brooks Robinson Drive, which is unsigned MD 129A and connects MD 129 with the complementary half-diamond interchange at Stevenson Road. A short distance north of I-695, MD 129 exits Pikesville and enters a rural area with scattered estate residences. The state highway crosses Jones Falls and intersects MD 130 west of the hamlet of Stevenson. North of Caves Road, MD 129 passes to the east of Caves Valley Historic District and through the affluent Worthington area before reaching its northern terminus at Garrison Forest Road east of Reisterstown.

MD 129 is a part of the National Highway System as a principal arterial between US 40 and MD 140 within Baltimore.

== History ==
Park Heights Avenue was paved from the Baltimore city limits near Cold Spring Lane north to Caves Road by 1910. The avenue was proposed for improvement south to Reisterstown Road. There were also plans to improve Park Heights Avenue north to its current terminus and extend the avenue toward northern Baltimore County along the route following by Garrison Forest Road, Greenspring Avenue, Tufton Avenue, Mantua Mill Road, Green Road, Butler Road, and Falls Road north to Mount Carmel Road. The segments along Butler Road and Falls Road became part of MD 128 and MD 25, respectively. The remainder of the route north of MD 129's terminus remained county roads. Park Heights Avenue between Cold Spring Lane and Reisterstown Road and Reisterstown Road south to Liberty Heights Avenue were paved in concrete by 1921. By 1923, Park Heights Road between Caves Road and Garrison Forest Road was paved in macadam, completing the highway in Baltimore County. That same year, Druid Hill Avenue was reconstructed with concrete from Paca Street to Druid Hill Park. The portion of Park Heights Avenue from Cold Spring Lane to Belvedere Avenue was reconstructed with concrete in 1924 and 1925. McCulloh Street was paved with concrete around 1933. By 1950, Park Heights Avenue was expanded to a divided highway from Reisterstown Road to Belvedere Avenue. Druid Hill Avenue and McCulloh Street became a one-way pair by 1955. Auchentoroly Terrace was completed by 1963, thus completing MD 129's modern route within the city of Baltimore.

== Junction list ==
County	Location	mi	km	Destinations	Notes
Baltimore City		0.00	0.00	US 40 west (Franklin Street) to US 40 east (Mulberry Street) / MD 295 south (Greene Street)	Southern terminus
Baltimore City		0.32	0.51	Martin Luther King Jr. Boulevard	
Baltimore City		1.40	2.25	US 1 / US 40 Truck (North Avenue)	
Baltimore City		2.44	3.93	Greenspring Avenue north / Liberty Heights Avenue west to MD 26 / MD 140 south	
Baltimore City		2.72	4.38	MD 140 south (Reisterstown Road)	No direct access from northbound MD 129 to southbound MD 129 or from northbound MD 140 to southbound MD 129; south end of concurrency with MD 140
Baltimore City		2.96	4.76	MD 140 north (Reisterstown Road) / Druid Park Drive	No direct access from southbound MD 129 to northbound MD 129 or from southbound MD 140 to northbound MD 129; north end of concurrency with MD 140
Baltimore City		4.08	6.57	Cold Spring Lane	
Baltimore City		5.44	8.75	Northern Parkway	
Baltimore	Pikesville	8.11	13.05	MD 133 east (Old Court Road) / Old Court Road west – Towson, Randallstown	Western terminus of MD 133
Baltimore	Pikesville	8.81	14.18	Brooks Robinson Drive east to I-695 east (Baltimore Beltway) – Towson	Unsigned MD 129A
Baltimore	Pikesville	8.91	14.34	I-695 west (Baltimore Beltway) – Glen Burnie	I-695 Exit 21
Baltimore	Stevenson	10.42	16.77	MD 130 (Greenspring Valley Road) – Brooklandville, Garrison	
Baltimore		15.43	24.83	Garrison Forest Road	Northern terminus
1.000 mi = 1.609 km; 1.000 km = 0.621 mi: Concurrency terminus

== Auxiliary route ==
MD 129A is the designation for Brooks Robinson Drive, which spans 0.48 miles (0.77 km) between MD 129 and Stevenson Road parallel to the eastbound direction of I-695 in Pikesville. MD 129A is a two-lane undivided road that connects the complementary half-diamond interchanges between I-695 and MD 129 at the west end of the highway and Stevenson Road at the east end. MD 129A was assigned no later than 1972. The highway was formerly known as Radio Tower Drive. In 2007, the route was renamed for Brooks Robinson, the Baltimore Orioles Hall of Famer.
