= U.S. Route 140 =

Former highway in the United States

U.S. Route 140
- US 140 highlighted over a modern map

Route information
- Auxiliary route of US 40
- Existed: 1926–January 1979

Major junctions
- South end: US 1 / US 40 Truck in Baltimore, MD
- North end: US 15 in Gettysburg, PA

Location
- Country: United States
- States: Maryland, Pennsylvania
- Counties: MD: City of Baltimore, Baltimore, Carroll; PA: Adams

Highway system
- United States Numbered Highway System; List; Special; Divided
| ← MD 139 | MD | → MD 140 |
| ← PA 139 | PA | → PA 141 |

U.S. Route 140 (Pennsylvania "Legislative Route 42") was a U.S. highway connecting Gettysburg, Pennsylvania, to Baltimore, Maryland. The route was deleted from the system in 1979; today the road's route is followed by portions of Pennsylvania Route 97, Maryland Route 97, and Maryland Route 140.

Though it had no historical significance in the battles fought at Gettysburg, it became important as the route to take to view the historic battlefields and cemetery there.

== Route description ==
=== Baltimore to Westminster ===
US 140 began at the intersection of US 1 (North Avenue) and Pennsylvania Avenue in Baltimore. Pennsylvania Avenue continues southeast from the intersection and would have connected US 140 with US 40, which then followed Franklin Street through downtown Baltimore. US 140 headed northeast on Pennsylvania Avenue three blocks to Fulton Street, where the U.S. Highway joined Reisterstown Road at its southern end. US 140 intersected Gwynns Falls Parkway and MD 26 (Liberty Heights Avenue), which were both boulevards. US 140 itself became a divided highway and passed along the edge of Druid Hill Park to Park Circle, which was then a traffic circle, where the highway met the southern end of MD 129 (Park Heights Avenue) and also Druid Park Drive. From Park Circle, US 140 became an undivided street that followed MD 140's out of the city of Baltimore.

US 140 continued along MD 140's modern course all the way to Reisterstown. In the center of Pikesville, the U.S. Highway met Old Court Road at staggered intersections, neither of which were the modern course of the crossroad. Old Court Road heading east, which was part of MD 133, used what is now Walker Avenue to connect with modern Old Court Road; Old Court Road west from US 140 used Naylors Lane. North of Pikesville, the U.S. Highway met the eastern end of MD 400 (Mount Wilson Lane), which led to Mount Wilson State Hospital. US 140 intersected MD 130 (Greenspring Valley Road) and the Greenspring Valley Branch of the Pennsylvania Railroad in Garrison, then passed under the Western Maryland Railway and over Gwynns Falls at Owings Mills. The U.S. Highway met the southern end of MD 30 (Hanover Pike) in the center of Reisterstown, where the highway turned northwest onto Westminster Pike.

US 140's course out of Reisterstown featured sharper corners than MD 140's modern course; the U.S. Highway used Amy Brent Way through the I-795–MD 140 interchange and the paralleling road east of the Woodfield Court intersection. US 140 veered northwest from the present alignment, briefly following Glen Falls Road before crossing the North Branch of the Patapsco River—Liberty Reservoir had not yet been created—on a road that no longer exists. The highway continued along Old Westminster Pike on the southbound side of modern MD 140. In Finksburg, US 140 intersected MD 91, which followed what is now MD 879 (Old Gamber Road and Cedarhurst Road). The U.S. Highway briefly followed modern MD 140 then Old Westminster Pike, which now acts as a service road for northbound MD 140. Near the hamlet of Sandyville, US 140 began to follow Old Westminster Pike on the southbound side of MD 140.

=== Westminster to Gettysburg ===
Shortly before the highway entered the town of Westminster, it met the northern end of MD 683 (Poole Road). The U.S. Highway entered Westminster as Main Street, which had an intersection with MD 559 (Manchester Avenue) immediately after its junction with MD 32 (Washington Road). US 140 and MD 32 continued northwest to the center of town. There, the highways had in rapid succession an intersection with MD 31 (Railroad Avenue), which headed toward Manchester; a grade crossing of the Western Maryland Railway (now Maryland Midland Railway); and an intersection with the northern end of MD 27 (Liberty Street). US 140, MD 31, and MD 32 followed Main Street two more blocks before US 140 split north onto Pennsylvania Avenue; MD 31 and MD 32 continued on Main Street to where they diverged toward New Windsor and Taneytown, respectively.

US 140 followed Pennsylvania Avenue north out of Westminster and continued along Littlestown Pike. The U.S. Highway followed what is today MD 97 with only minor deviations through an intersection with MD 496 (Bachman Valley Road) and Union Mills before entering Pennsylvania south of Littlestown. US 140 followed its modern course along Queen Street through Littlestown, where it had a grade crossing of the Pennsylvania Railroad line between Frederick and Hanover and intersected PA 194 (King Street). The U.S. Highway followed Baltimore Pike all the way to its and US 140's northern terminus in Gettysburg at US 15 (now US 15 Business). US 15 headed south on Steinwehr Avenue and north along Baltimore Street toward the central square of Gettysburg, where the U.S. Highway intersected US 30.

== History ==
US 140 was first signed with the inception of the U.S. Highway numbering system in 1926. The route received numerous realignments over the years. In 1977, plans were made for US 140 to be decommissioned, with the route to be replaced by MD 140 between Baltimore and Westminster, MD 97 between Westminster and the Pennsylvania state line, and PA 97 between the Maryland state line and Gettysburg. This proposal was made in order to eliminate short routes from the U.S. Highway System. The American Association of State Highway and Transportation Officials approved the removal of the US 140 designation on October 28, 1977. At one point, the section between MD 30 in Reisterstown and Westminster was to become a part of MD 9, which would continue northwest to Emmitsburg; MD 140 was to be designated between Baltimore and Reisterstown. In December 1978, the borough of Littlestown protested the renumbering of US 140 to PA 97. US 140 was decommissioned on January 1, 1979 and became MD 140 between Baltimore and Westminster, MD 97 between Westminster and the state line, and PA 97 within Pennsylvania.

The only freeway bypass of the original US 140 is Interstate 795, which runs from Reisterstown to the Baltimore Beltway. Regardless of the bypass, Maryland Route 140 is still the most direct route from Baltimore to the historical sites of Gettysburg.

== Junction list ==
This table shows the intersections of US 140 as they existed in 1945.

| State | County | Location | mi | km | Destinations | Notes |
|---|---|---|---|---|---|---|
| Maryland | Baltimore City | | | | US 1 (North Avenue) / Pennsylvania Avenue south – Washington, Philadelphia | Southern terminus of US 140; intersection of US 1 and Pennsylvania Avenue |
| Maryland | Baltimore City | | | | MD 26 west (Liberty Heights Avenue) | |
| Maryland | Baltimore City | | | | MD 129 north (Park Heights Avenue) / Druid Park Drive | Park Circle |
| Maryland | Baltimore | Pikesville | | | MD 133 east (Old Court Road) / Old Court Road west – Rockland | Near intersection of MD 140 and Old Court Road |
| Maryland | Baltimore | Pikesville | | | MD 400 west (Mount Wilson Lane) – Mount Wilson State Hospital | Intersection of MD 140 and Mount Wilson Lane |
| Maryland | Baltimore | Garrison | | | MD 130 east (Greenspring Valley Road) – Brooklandville | |
| Maryland | Baltimore | Reisterstown | | | MD 127 east (Chatsworth Avenue) – Glyndon | Intersection of MD 140 and Chatsworth Avenue |
| Maryland | Baltimore | Reisterstown | | | MD 30 north (Hanover Pike) – Hampstead, Manchester | |
| Maryland | Carroll | Finksburg | | | MD 91 (Gamber Road) – Gamber, Hampstead | Intersection of Old Westminster Pike and Old Gamber Road |
| Maryland | Carroll | Westminster | | | MD 683 south (Poole Road) | Intersection of Main Street and Poole Road |
| Maryland | Carroll | Westminster | | | MD 32 south (Washington Road) – Sykesville | Intersection of Main Street and Washington Road; south end of concurrency with MD 32 |
| Maryland | Carroll | Westminster | | | MD 559 east (Manchester Avenue) | Intersection of Main Street and Manchester Avenue |
| Maryland | Carroll | Westminster | | | MD 31 east (Railroad Avenue) – Manchester | Intersection of Main Street and MD 27; south end of concurrency with MD 31 |
| Maryland | Carroll | Westminster | | | MD 27 south (Liberty Street) – Mount Airy | Near intersection of Main Street and MD 27 |
| Maryland | Carroll | Westminster | | | MD 31 west / MD 32 north (Main Street) – New Windsor, Taneytown | Intersection of Main Street and Pennsylvania Avenue; north end of concurrencies with MD 31 and MD 32 |
| Maryland | Carroll | | | | MD 496 east (Bachmans Valley Road) | Intersection of MD 97 and MD 496 |
| Mason–Dixon line | | | | | Maryland–Pennsylvania state line | |
| Pennsylvania | Adams | Littlestown | | | PA 194 (King Street) – Hanover, Taneytown | Intersection of PA 97 and PA 194 |
| Pennsylvania | Adams | Gettysburg | | | US 15 (Baltimore Street/Steinwehr Avenue) to US 30 – Harrisburg, Frederick, York, Chambersburg | Northern terminus of US 140; intersection of Baltimore Street and US 15 Business (Steinwehr Avenue) |
1.000 mi = 1.609 km; 1.000 km = 0.621 mi
