= Old Court Road =

State highway in Maryland, US

Old Court Road
- Old Court Road in red, with MD 125 in blue and MD 133 in magenta

Route information
- Maintained by MDSHA, Howard County, and Baltimore County
- Length: 15.4 mi (24.8 km) MD 125 is 3.59 mi (5.78 km). MD 133 is 3.31 miles (5.33 km). County-maintained Woodstock Road is 1.2 mi (1.9 km). The western county-maintained section of Old Court Road is 6.2 mi (10.0 km). The eastern county-maintained section of Old Court Road, including Ruxton Road, is 1.2 mi (1.9 km).

Major junctions
- West end: MD 99 near Woodstock
- MD 26 in Randallstown; MD 140 in Pikesville; MD 129 in Pikesville; MD 25 near Ruxton; I-83 near Ruxton
- East end: Joppa Road near Towson

Location
- Country: United States
- State: Maryland
- Counties: Howard, Baltimore

Highway system
- Maryland highway system; Interstate; US; State; Scenic Byways
← MD 124	MD 125	→ MD 128
← MD 132	MD 133	→ MD 134

Old Court Road is a state- and county-maintained highway in the U.S. state of Maryland. Including the adjacent road in Howard County known as Woodstock Road, the highway runs 15.4 miles (24.8 km) from Maryland Route 99 (MD 99) near Woodstock east to Joppa Road near Towson. Old Court Road includes two county-maintained sections and two Maryland state highways, Maryland Route 125 (MD 125) and Maryland Route 133 (MD 133). MD 125 has a length of 3.59 miles (5.78 km) between Woodstock and the edge of Randallstown and MD 133 spans 3.31 miles (5.33 km) between MD 129 and MD 25 in Pikesville. Old Court Road connects the western and central Baltimore County communities of Granite, Randallstown, Milford Mill, Pikesville, and Towson. Old Court Road has been a cross-county highway since the colonial era. The highway was fully paved in Baltimore County by the mid-1920s, including the sections of the highway that became MD 125 and MD 133. MD 133 was extended west to MD 140 and MD 125 was extended west to MD 99 in the early 1930s; MD 125's terminus returned to the Patapsco River in the mid-1950s. Old Court Road was relocated at its eastern end in the early 1960s and in Pikesville in the late 1960s, at which time MD 133 assumed its current course.

== Route description ==
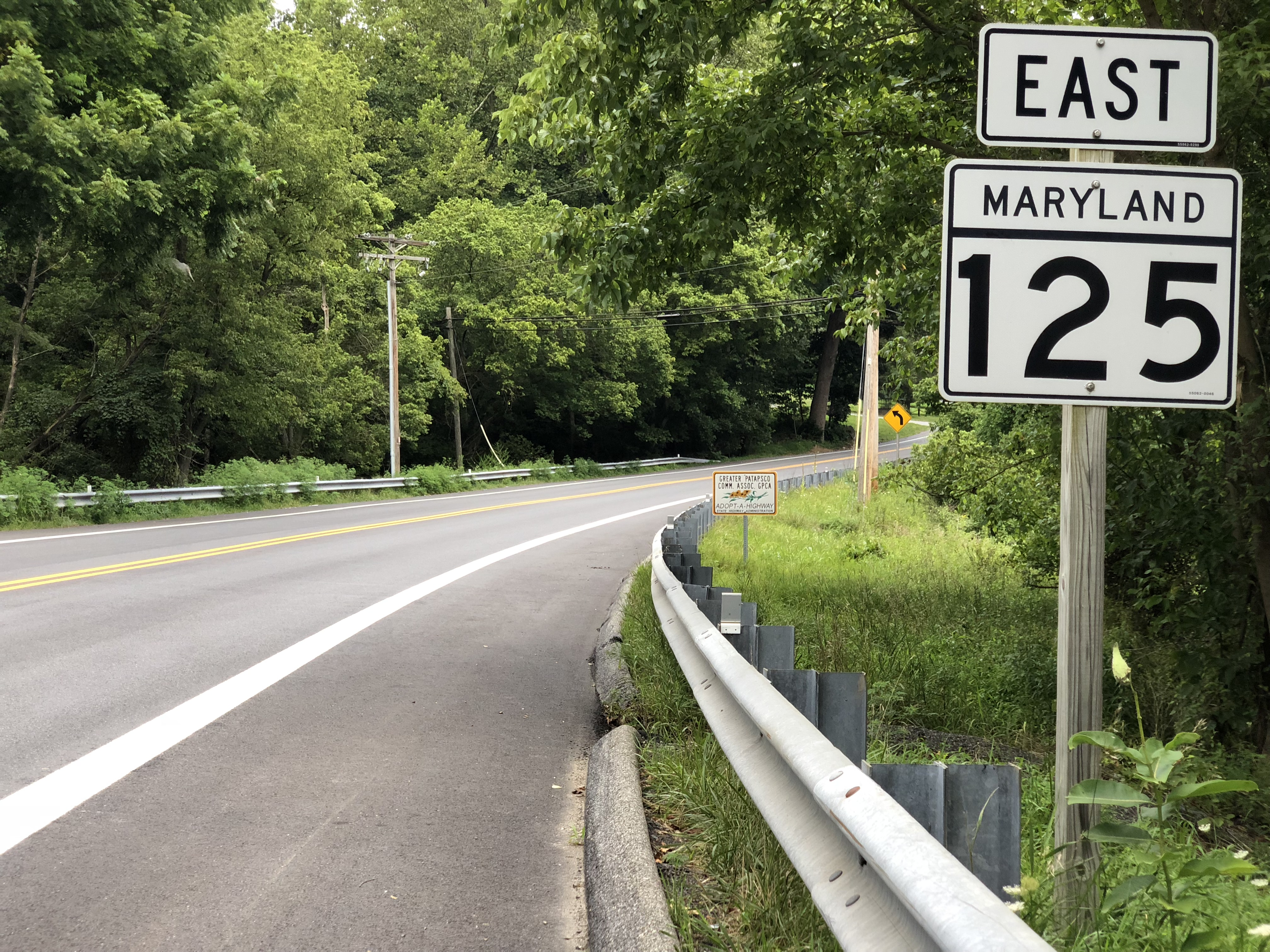
View east along the MD 125 section of Old Court Road in Granite

Woodstock Road begins at an intersection with MD 99 (Old Frederick Road) northwest of Ellicott City. The two-lane undivided county highway passes through farmland then has a forested descent into the narrow Patapsco River valley. MD 125 begins within the hamlet of Woodstock, where the highway has a grade crossing of CSX's Old Main Line Subdivision railroad line and crosses the Patapsco River into Baltimore County. The state highway, now known as Old Court Road, passes an entrance to Patapsco Valley State Park and the former grounds of Woodstock College as it ascends out of the river valley. MD 125 has a curvaceous path through the village of Granite, which is preserved as the Granite Historic District. The state highway continues through farmland to its eastern terminus at an arbitrary point 3.50 miles (5.63 km) east of the Patapsco River.

Old Court Road continues as a county highway into the suburban area of Randallstown. The highway expands to a four-lane undivided road shortly before its intersection with MD 26 (Liberty Road). Old Court Road passes along the northern edge of Milford Mill community and crosses over Interstate 695 (I-695, Baltimore Beltway) just south of its interchange with I-795 (Northwest Expressway). The highway crosses over MTA Maryland's Baltimore Metro SubwayLink next to the transit line's Old Court station and passes under CSX's Hanover Subdivision railroad line. In the center of Pikesville, Old Court Road intersects MD 140 (Reisterstown Road) and follows the southern edge of Druid Ridge Cemetery to Sudbrook Lane close to Mettam Memorial Baptist Church. Old Court Road continues along the line of Sudbrook Lane to its intersection with MD 129 (Park Heights Avenue).

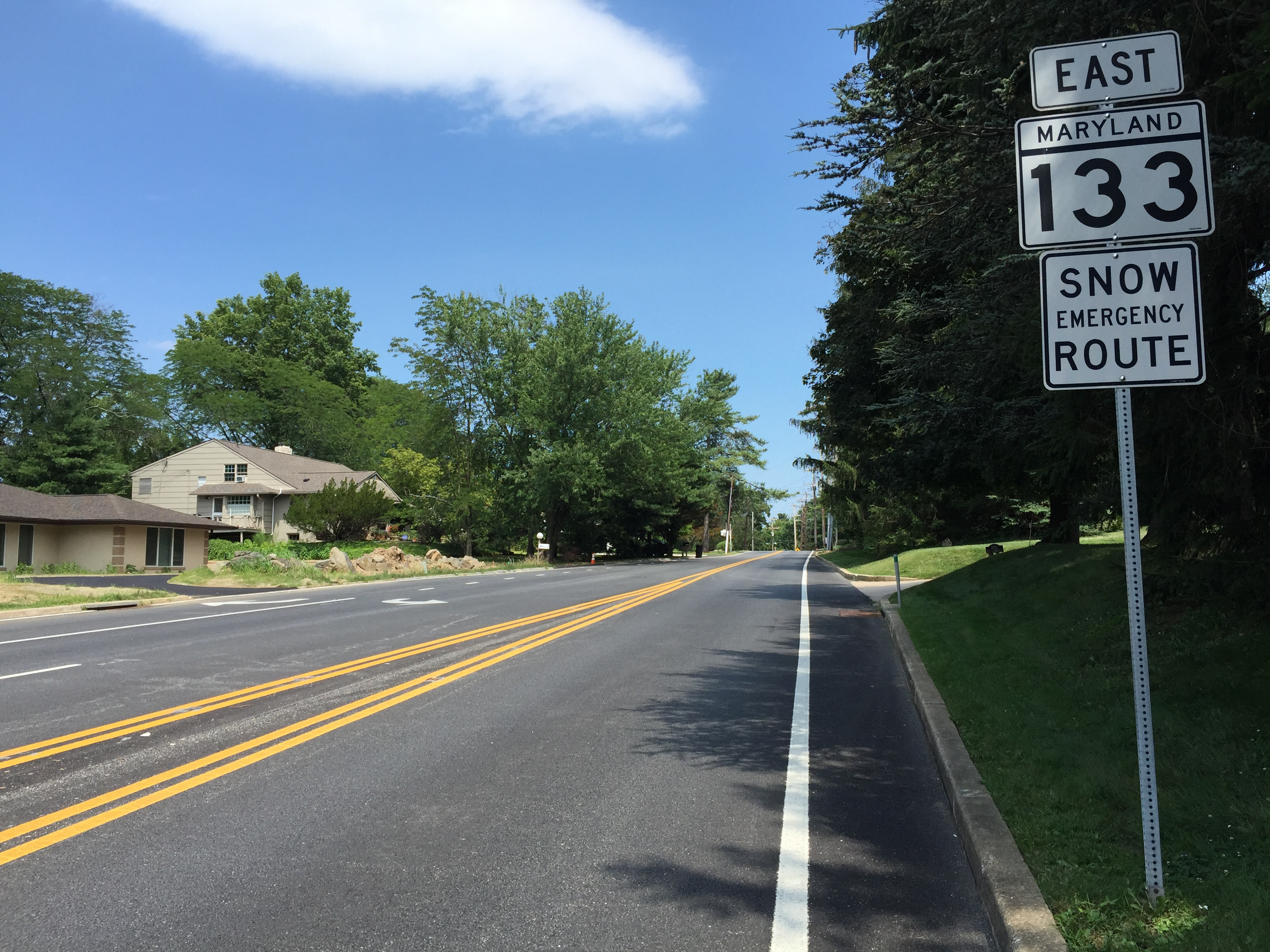
View east along the MD 133 section of Old Court Road in Pikesville

Old Court Road continues as MD 133, which immediately turns east as county-maintained Stevenson Road continues straight. The state highway carries two lanes past several farm fields between suburban subdivisions and Beth Tfiloh Dahan Community School. MD 133 intersects Greenspring Avenue just south of I-695 then passes through several curves, during which the highway passes the Park School of Baltimore. MD 133 reaches its eastern terminus at MD 25 (Falls Road) within the Rockland Historic District. The roadway continues east as Ruxton Road, which has a half-diamond interchange with I-83 (Jones Falls Expressway) that allows access to and from Baltimore. At the exit ramp from northbound I-83 to Ruxton Road, the eastern segment of Old Court Road heads north parallel to the freeway. Before I-83 has its southern interchange with I-695, Old Court Road curves east and reaches its eastern terminus at Joppa Road, which heads northwest to Brooklandville and east through Riderwood to the center of Towson.

Old Court Road is a part of the National Highway System as an intermodal connector between the Old Court station on the Baltimore Metro SubwayLink and MD 140.

== History ==
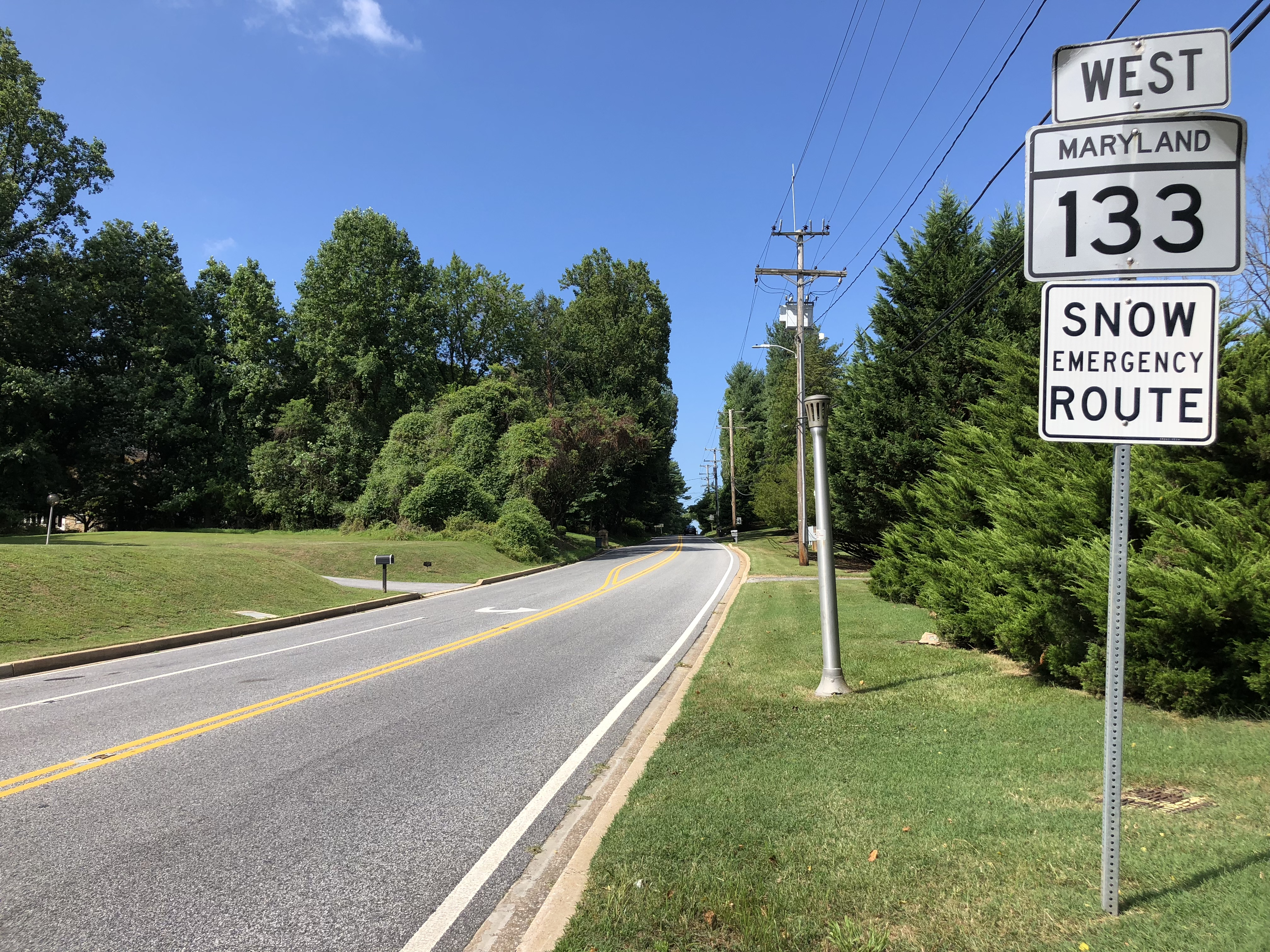
MD 133 westbound past Greenspring Avenue in Pikesville

Old Court Road originated as an Indian trail that was repurposed in the late 17th century as a patrol road and defensive perimeter across Baltimore County for rangers based at Fort Garrison to defend English settlements from hostile Indians. In conjunction with the Joppa Road, in the 18th century the path became the cross-county highway to Joppa, the original county seat of Baltimore County, which was located on the Gunpowder River near what is now Joppatowne. The first section of the road built as a modern highway was from Falls Road west to near Park Heights Avenue in Pikesville, which was under construction as a 14-foot (4.3 m) wide macadam road by 1911 and completed by 1915. The macadam road was extended west to Park Heights Avenue in 1923, completing what is today the full length of MD 133.

The MD 125 portion of Old Court Road was paved in macadam through Granite in 1924 and relocated and paved in concrete from Granite to the Patapsco River in 1924 and 1925. With the completion of those sections, Old Court Road featured an all-weather surface from the Patapsco River to Towson on both its state-maintained and county-maintained sections. In 1932 and 1933, three sections of the highway were upgraded: MD 133 was extended west and the existing macadam road resurfaced for 0.5 miles (0.80 km) to U.S. Route 140 (US 140, now MD 140); MD 125 was extended east and resurfaced for 2.1 miles (3.4 km) to its current eastern terminus; and MD 125 was extended west and resurfaced along Woodstock Road to MD 99. In 1956, four years after the highway's bridge over the Patapsco River was redecked, the Howard County portion of MD 125 was transferred to county maintenance. In 2002, a 0.09-mile (0.14 km) section of Woodstock Road immediately to the west of the Patapsco River was returned to state maintenance.

In 1957, a connector road was built from just east of the eastern terminus of MD 133 to Joppa Road at what is now the latter highway's overpass of I-695 near Riderwood. This connector road, which was briefly a state highway, became part of I-83 in 1962. Old Court Road and Ruxton Road were relocated at I-83; previously the easternmost section of Old Court Road met MD 25 north of MD 133's terminus and Ruxton Road, which prior to 1963 was part of MD 134, met MD 25 south of MD 133's terminus. When Ruxton Road's interchange with I-83 was built, Ruxton Road was realigned to end at the same intersection as MD 133. The current north–south section of Old Court Road east of I-83 was built to replace the disconnected segment to the north. Similar to the situation at MD 25, Old Court Road previously met US 140 at staggered intersections and the westernmost portion of MD 133 was part of Sudbrook Lane. In 1967, Old Court Road was relocated to its present alignment between US 140 and Sudbrook Lane. MD 133 was truncated at MD 129 to bring MD 133 to its current length in 1969.

== Junction list ==
County	Location	mi	km	Destinations	Notes
Howard	Woodstock	0.0	0.0	MD 99 (Old Frederick Road) – Ellicott City, West Friendship	Western terminus of Woodstock Road; Woodstock Road begins as a county highway
Howard	Woodstock	1.2	1.9	County–state maintenance boundary	Western terminus of MD 125
Patapsco River		1.3	2.1	Howard–Baltimore county line; Woodstock Road ends and Old Court Road begins	
Baltimore	Randallstown	4.7	7.6	State–county maintenance boundary	Eastern terminus of MD 125
Baltimore	Randallstown	7.0	11.3	MD 26 (Liberty Road) – Baltimore, Frederick	
Baltimore	Randallstown	8.3	13.4	Rolling Road south – Catonsville	
Baltimore	Pikesville	10.3	16.6	MD 140 (Reisterstown Road) – Baltimore, Reisterstown	
Baltimore	Pikesville	10.9	17.5	MD 129 (Park Heights Avenue) – Baltimore	Western terminus of MD 133; county–state maintenance boundary
Baltimore	Pikesville	14.2	22.9	MD 25 (Falls Road) – Baltimore, Brooklandville	Eastern terminus of MD 133; Old Court Road ends and Ruxton Road begins; state–county maintenance boundary
Baltimore	Riderwood	14.5	23.3	I-83 south (Jones Falls Expressway) / Ruxton Road east – Baltimore, York	I-83 Exit 12; Old Court Road begins by turning north from Ruxton Road
Baltimore	Riderwood	15.4	24.8	Joppa Road – Towson, Brooklandville	Eastern terminus of Old Court Road
1.000 mi = 1.609 km; 1.000 km = 0.621 mi: Route transition
