= Brooklandville House =

- U.S. National Register of Historic Places
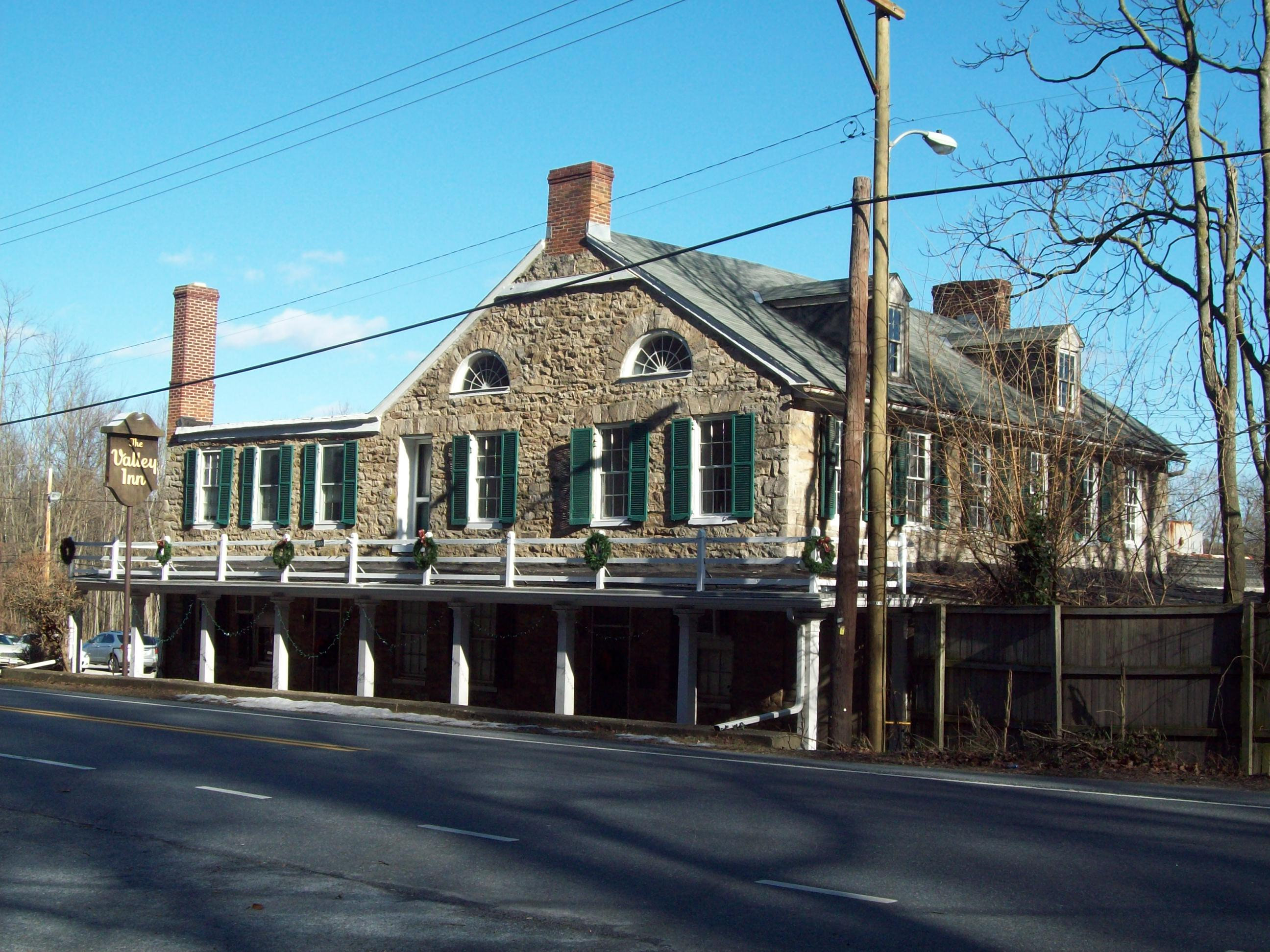
- Brooklandville House, December 2009

- Location within Maryland Location within the United States
- Location: 10501 Falls Road (MD 25), Lutherville-Timonium, MD 21093. (South of Brooklandville at Falls and Hillside Roads), Brooklandville, Maryland
- Coordinates: 39°24′41″N 76°40′2.7″W
- Area: 1.5 acres (0.61 ha)
- Built: 1832
- Part of: Green Spring Valley Historic District (ID80001797)
- NRHP reference No.: 77000682
- Added to NRHP: November 23, 1977

Brooklandville House, or the Valley Inn, is a historic restaurant and tavern building, and a former inn, located in Brooklandville, Baltimore County, Maryland. It is a 2 1/2-story stone structure facing the former railroad and dating from about 1832. It is associated with the Baltimore and Susquehanna Railroad, which crossed the property just to the south.

Brooklandville House (the Valley Inn), was listed on the National Register of Historic Places on November 23, 1977. The historic building is situated in the Green Spring Valley Historic District, near Stevenson in Baltimore County, Maryland, United States.
