= Maryland Route 130 =

State highway in Baltimore County, Maryland, known as Greenspring Valley Rd

Maryland Route 130
- Greenspring Valley Road
- Maryland Route 130 highlighted in red

Route information
- Maintained by MDSHA
- Length: 5.57 mi (8.96 km)
- Existed: 1927–present

Major junctions
- West end: MD 140 in Garrison
- MD 129 near Stevenson
- East end: MD 25 in Brooklandville

Location
- Country: United States
- State: Maryland
- Counties: Baltimore

Highway system
- Maryland highway system; Interstate; US; State; Scenic Byways
| ← MD 129 | → MD 131 |

Maryland Route 130 (MD 130) is a state highway located in Baltimore County in the U.S. state of Maryland. Known as Greenspring Valley Road, the state highway runs 5.57 miles (8.96 km) from MD 140 in Garrison east to MD 25 in Brooklandville. MD 130 passes through the Green Spring Valley, an affluent area around the upper reaches of Jones Falls that contains Stevenson University. The state highway was paved by 1910 except for a gap near Stevenson that was closed in the mid-1930s.

== Route description ==
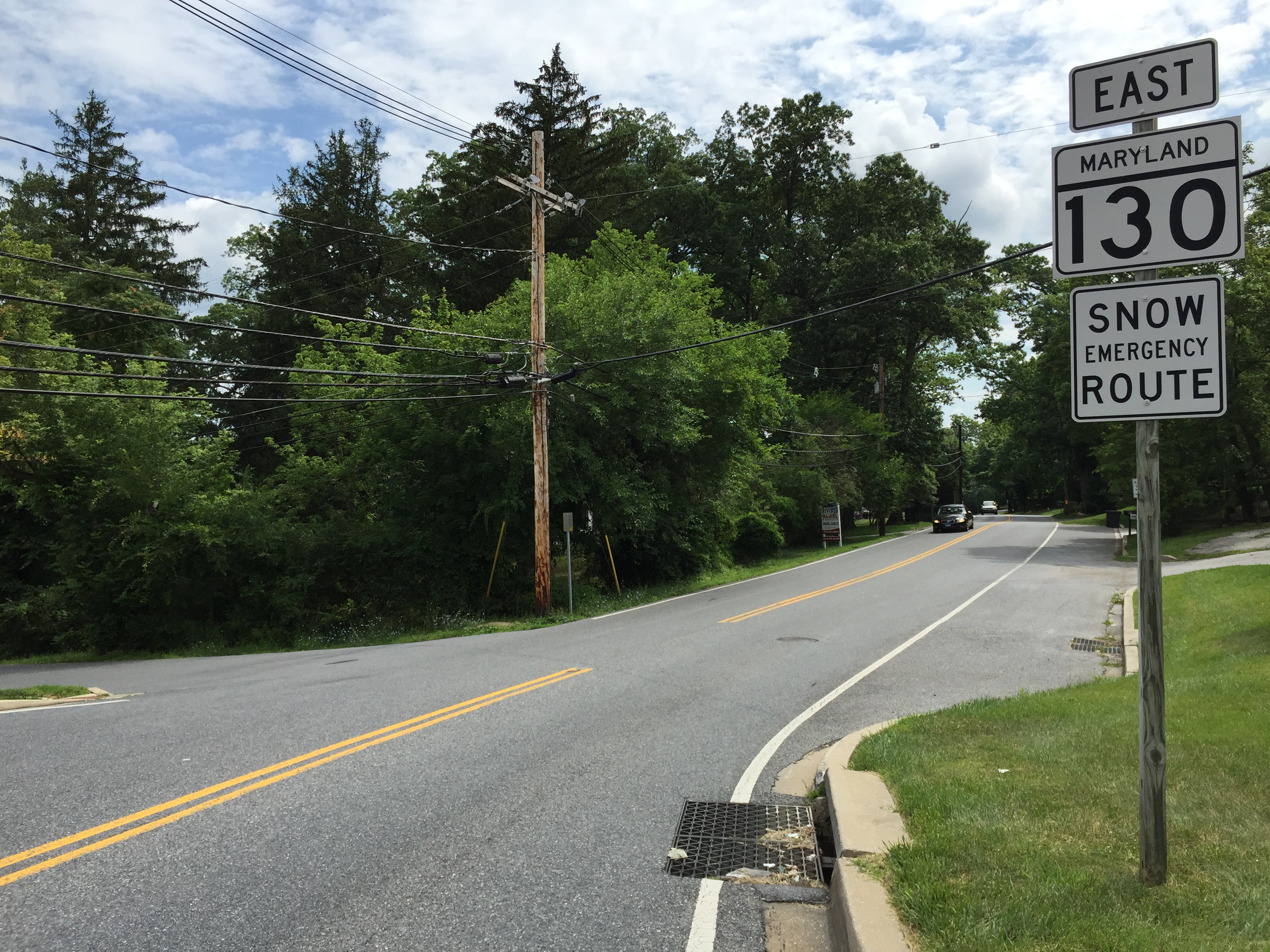
View east from the west end of MD 130 at MD 140 in Garrison

MD 130 begins at an intersection with MD 140 (Reisterstown Road) in Garrison. The state highway heads east as a two-lane undivided road and passes along the edge of the Green Spring Valley Hunt Club and the Green Spring Valley Golf Course, at the edge of which the highway passes through a right-angle curve. MD 130 enters a more rural area and intersects MD 129 (Park Heights Avenue). The state highway passes through the Green Spring Valley Historic District around its intersection with Stevenson Road, which leads south through the hamlet of Stevenson. MD 130 passes through another sharp curve, crosses the North Branch of Jones Falls, passes north of the main campus of Stevenson University, and passes through a pair of right-angle curves just east of the Gramercy Mansion and west of its junction with Greenspring Avenue. The state highway crosses Dipping Pond Run and passes to the south of St. Paul's School before reaching its eastern terminus with MD 25 (Falls Road) in Brooklandville.

== History ==
All of Greenspring Road was paved by 1910 except for a gap at Stevenson Road. That gap in MD 130 was filled in 1934. There has been very little change to MD 130 since then.

== Junction list ==
The entire route is in Baltimore County.

| Location | mi | km | Destinations | Notes |
|---|---|---|---|---|
| Garrison | 0.00 | 0.00 | MD 140 (Reisterstown Road) – Owings Mills, Pikesville | Western terminus |
| Stevenson | 1.74 | 2.80 | MD 129 (Park Heights Avenue) – Pikesville | |
| Brooklandville | 5.57 | 8.96 | MD 25 (Falls Road) – Baltimore, Butler | Eastern terminus |
1.000 mi = 1.609 km; 1.000 km = 0.621 mi
