= Gramercy Mansion =

Historic building in Stevenson, Maryland

Coordinates: 39.426166°N 76.696855°W

Gramercy Mansion is a historic mansion in Stevenson, Maryland, United States, located on Greenspring Valley Road near Stevenson University. It was built in 1902 by Alexander J. Cassatt, president of the Pennsylvania Railroad and brother of the American Impressionist painter, Mary Cassatt. Gramercy Mansion was presented as a wedding gift to Cassatt's daughter, Eliza. Later owners included the prominent Brewster family, one of whom became a senator from Maryland. In the 1950s the estate became home to the Koinonia Foundation, a predecessor of the Peace Corps. Koinonia established the first organic farm in Maryland, which has been continuously operated since 1950.

In 1985, Anne and Ron Pomykala purchased and restored the mansion, carriage house, houses and outbuildings and installed formal gardens. The farm was expanded with greenhouses in another location with the former fields containing hardy perennial herbs. Koinonia Farms now produces culinary herbs and wholesales to Whole Foods, Giant and Graul's. Currently, Gramercy Mansion on 45 acres is a bed and breakfast, and it hosts over 100 wedding receptions, elopements, parties, and business conferences each year.

The owners expanded and purchased a sister property in 2007, the 1840s Carrollton Inn and Plaza in Baltimore City. In 2018, they purchased another property, Grey Rock Mansion, located in Pikesville, MD.
