= Rockland Historic District =

Rockland Historic District may refer to:

- Rockland Historic District (Rockland, Delaware), listed on the NRHP in Delaware
- Rockland Residential Historic District, Rockland, ME, listed on the NRHP in Maine
- Rockland Historic District (Brooklandville, Maryland), listed on the NRHP in Maryland
