= Park Heights Historic District =

- U.S. National Register of Historic Places
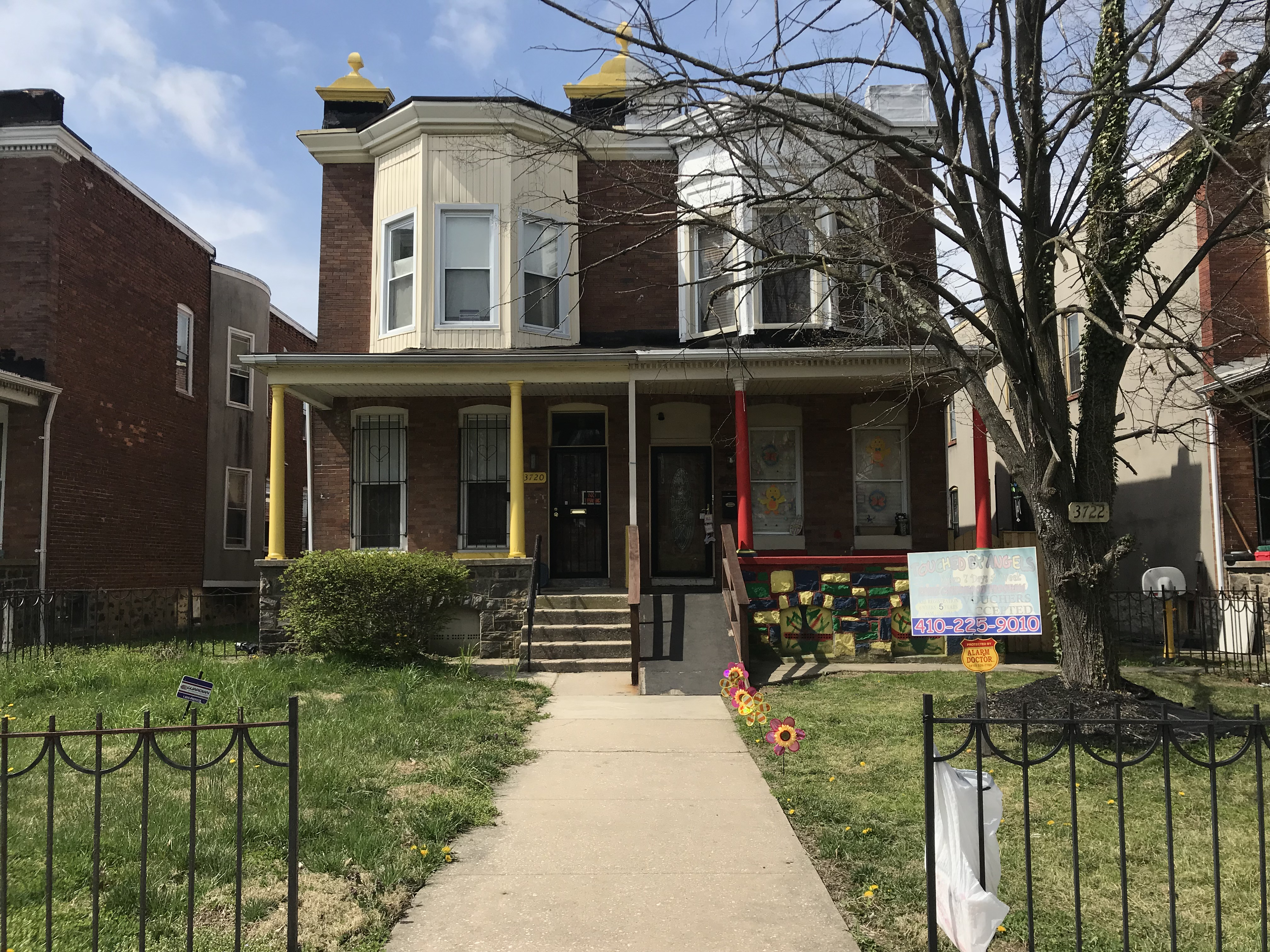
- "Daylight" row houses in Park Heights

- Location within Baltimore Location within Maryland Location within the United States
- Location: Roughly bounded by Northern Pkwy., Greenspring Ave., the Park Circle Historic District, and the Western MD rail line. Baltimore, Maryland
- Coordinates: 39°20′46″N 76°40′20″W
- Area: 1,500 acres (610 ha)
- Built: 1906-1960
- NRHP reference No.: 100009276
- Added to NRHP: August 31, 2023

Park Heights Historic District, is a historic district located in the Park Heights area of Baltimore, Maryland, United States. The district encompasses 7,171 contributing historic resources built between 1906 and 1960, and north of the Park Circle Historic District. The area developed as a streetcar suburb, and features both pairs and rows of two-story, bay-window porch-front “Daylight” houses. Also in the district are a number of detached frame houses, many in the bungalow style.

It was listed on the National Register of Historic Places in 2023.
