= 2010 Baltimore beating =

Crime in Baltimore, Maryland, United States

In 2010 an African-American teenager in Baltimore, Maryland was beaten by two Orthodox Jewish men in the neighborhood of Upper Park Heights. Authorities accused two brothers from Cheswolde, Eli Albrecht (née Werdesheim) and Avi Werdesheim, respectively 24 and 22 years of age, of beating the teenager after receiving reports of suspicious behavior from an Orthodox Jewish neighborhood watch group. Eliyahu received convictions of false imprisonment and second degree assault. He was acquitted of the charge of carrying a deadly weapon with intent to injure. Avi was acquitted of all three charges.

Several observers compared this beating to the Trayvon Martin shooting case in Florida. Because of the publicity of the Martin case, the Werdesheim brothers had put forward a motion to move the trial, because of fears that it would be difficult to find an impartial jury. The brothers withdrew the motion and instead selected a bench trial.

== See also ==
- Racism in Jewish communities
