= Park Heights, Baltimore =

Park Heights
- Neighborhood of Baltimore
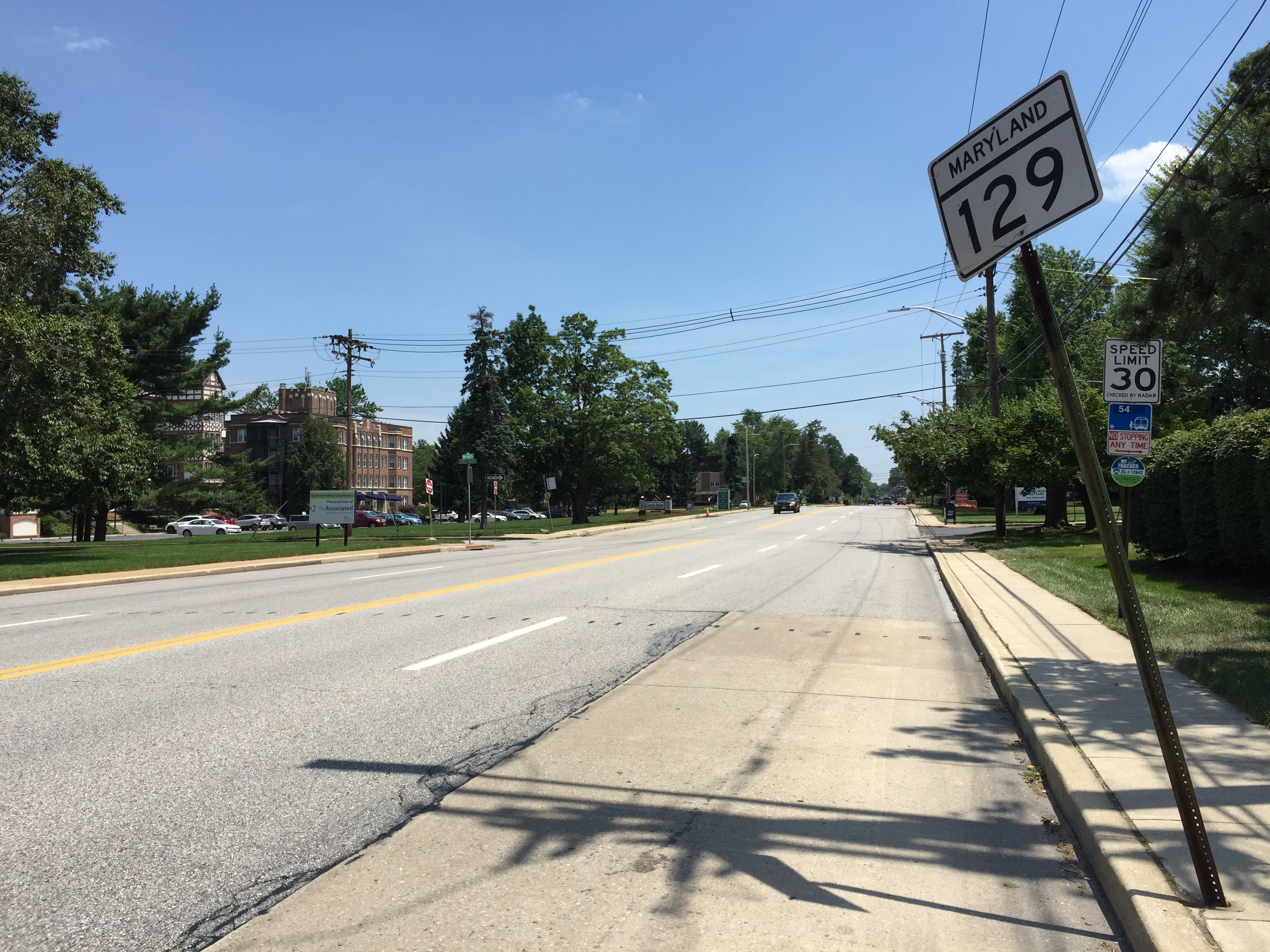
- Park Heights Avenue between Slade Avenue and Park Village Court

- Location within Baltimore
- Coordinates: 39°20′13″N 76°39′51″W
- Country: United States
- State: Maryland
- City: Baltimore

Park Heights is an area of Baltimore, Maryland, that lies approximately 5 miles northwest of downtown Baltimore and within two miles of the Baltimore County line. A 1,500-acre community, Park Heights comprises 12 smaller neighborhoods that together contain approximately 30,000 residents. It is bounded on the south by Druid Park Drive, on the west by Wabash Avenue, on the east by Greenspring Avenue, and on the north by Northern Parkway. Interstate-83 is less than a half mile to the east.

Two major roadways, Park Heights Avenue and Reisterstown Road, run north-south through Park Heights, serving as the neighborhood's main streets and primary commuter corridors. Limited commercial uses, primarily retail, are scattered along these roads; there is also some industrial activity on the neighborhood's western edge.

Otherwise, Park Heights is characterized by residential uses, which run the spectrum from stable, well-tended streets to entire blocks of abandoned houses and lots. Major health care, educational, and social service institutions are located throughout the community, as well as one of Baltimore and the State of Maryland's most well-known landmarks, Pimlico Race Track.

The boundaries of Park Heights, as defined by the Baltimore City Planning Department, are bounded north and south by Park Circle and Northern Parkway and east and west by Greenspring and Wabash Avenues, respectively; and includes the neighborhoods of Arlington, Central Park Heights, Cylburn, Greenspring, Langston Hughes, Levindale, Lucille Park, the historic Park Circle, Park Lane, Pimlico Good Neighbor, Towanda/Grantley, Woodmere. Park Heights boasts one of the largest foreign born Black populations in Baltimore, in the areas surrounding Belvedere Avenue, with immigrants from Jamaica, Trinidad, Haiti, and other Caribbean countries.

== History ==
Park Heights follows a classic pattern of many older American urban neighborhoods. Initially it was central to Baltimore's growing economy. Early in the 19th century, for example, Reisterstown Road served as a major route for transporting wheat and corn from farms northwest of the city to the port, where it was shipped down the Chesapeake Bay to the West Indies and Europe. The city began the formal annexation of Park Heights in 1888, but it was not until 1911 that the Reisterstown tollgates— one of which was located at what is now Park Circle—were dismantled.

Starting in the early 19th century, Baltimore became a major port of entry for European immigrants. Many settled in the northern and western reaches of the city, with Park Heights serving as a kind of way station for several generations. By 1950, the neighborhood had been settled by the children of Jewish immigrants who had migrated from the Reservoir Hill area of Baltimore and before that from as far as the Jonestown area of Baltimore.

During the late 19th century, as streetcars became a primary source of transportation, Park Heights' neighborhoods sprang up around an intricate system of streetcar lines. By 1920 two major streetcar routes ran along Park Heights Avenue and three crosstown lines on Belvedere Avenue. This dictated the positioning of retail and commercial nodes along these lines, surrounded by residential neighborhoods.

A major destination reachable by streetcar was the Pimlico Race Course, which opened in 1870 as the Pimlico Fairgrounds and which triggered the development of nearby hotels, restaurants, and other entertainment venues. Those venues are now gone, but Pimlico remains. One day a year, during the running of the Preakness Stakes, it draws national attention and crowds of more than 100,000 to Park Heights.

By 1945 the neighborhood was largely built out in its present form. Park Heights resembled a classic "streetcar suburb," with lively commercial districts serving handsome, tree-lined residential blocks.

Today, Park Heights is largely poor and more than 96% African American. This population shift occurred relatively quickly during the 1960s as a result of various social, economic, racial, and political factors faced by the city, state, and nation. These factors led to an exodus of whites from Baltimore into the surrounding counties. This dramatic shift is now reflected in the changed patient demographics of Sinai Hospital, the community's largest employer and primary health care provider. As one of only a dozen officially Jewish hospitals in the country, Sinai's patients were once close to 100% white and Jewish. Today, more than 50% of Sinai's patients are African American. There is a Star of David carved in stone on the community's Baptist and Pentecostal churches, which serves as a visible reminder of this recent and dramatic population shift.

In 1929, Park Heights was home to Handler Field, a pioneer commercial airport where the Baltimore Airways Company served New-York to Baltimore daily service.

In 2010, an abnormal occurrence happened when a beating occurred in Upper Park Heights. An African-American teenager was attacked by two white Orthodox Jewish men after they received a report of suspicious activities from an Orthodox Jewish neighborhood watch group. One of the men received convictions for false imprisonment and second degree assault, while the other was acquitted on all charges.

== Public transportation ==
The Park Heights area is served by multiple modes of public transportation, provided by the Maryland Transit Administration.

On all parts of Park Heights Avenue itself, Bus Route 54 provides frequent single-seat service. Bus service is also provided on small portions of Park Heights Avenue by Routes 58 and 97. Route 53 also operates nearby on the parallel Reisterstown Road, and Routes 27, 33, 44, 60, and 91 operate on streets crossing Park Heights Avenue.

The Baltimore Metro Subway has several stations within a close walk of the Park Heights area.

There are also many shuttles provided for senior citizens by various apartments and non-profit organizations.

== Crime ==
During the past few decades (1980-2000), the Lower Park Heights area has had high crime rates, and was ranked by the Baltimore Police Department as one of the highest per capita crime areas of the city.

Over the years, various city officials have attempted to take steps to reduce crime in the area and improve safety for residents. These measures have included improved police presence, surveillance cameras, and redevelopment or remodeling of abandoned structures. Since 2010, Park Heights has witnessed growth and urban renewal, as a preferred area of investment for many developers. Also, the Northwest Citizen's Patrol organized by the Orthodox Jewish Community has aided in the safety of the community.

In 2018, Larry Hogan pledged $52 Million over the next 10 years to bring Park Heights back to the vibrancy it boasted in the 1950s.

== Notable residents ==
- Frank Zappa, composer and musician
- Steve Krulevitz, American-Israeli tennis player
- Brandon Scott, Mayor of Baltimore

== See also ==
- Park Heights Historic District
- List of Baltimore neighborhoods
