= Langston Hughes, Baltimore =

Langston Hughes
- neighborhood statistical area
- Location within Baltimore
- Coordinates: 39°20′36″N 76°40′53″W
- Country: United States
- State: Maryland
- City: Baltimore

Area
  - Total: 0.079 sq mi (0.20 km^{2})
  - Land: 0.079 sq mi (0.20 km^{2})

Population (2009)
  - Total: 1,132
  - Density: 14,000/sq mi (5,500/km^{2})
- Time zone: UTC-5 (Eastern)
  - Summer (DST): UTC-4 (EDT)
- ZIP code: 21215
- Area code: 410, 443, and 667

Langston Hughes is a neighborhood in the Northwest District of Baltimore, located between the neighborhoods of Central Park Heights (east) and Woodmere. Its roughly pentagonal boundaries are marked by West Belvedere Avenue (northwest), Litchfield Avenue (northeast), Reisterstown Road (south) and Oakmont Avenue (east).

A predominantly black community, the neighborhood of Langston Hughes is named for the black poet and novelist, Langston Hughes. Langston Hughes Elementary School, located within the neighborhood at 5011 Arbutus Avenue, also bears the poet's name.

== Demographics ==
The population of Langston Hughes was estimated at 1,132 in 2009. Its median household income for that year was $34,764, compared with the city-wide median of $38,772. At an average of $229,395, the price of single-family housing in the neighborhood was significantly less than the city average of $274,562. The ratio of families with incomes below the poverty line, estimated at 27.8 percent in 2009, was higher than the overall city ratio of 22.9 percent.

== Public transportation ==
LocalLink 94 (BaltimoreLink) and LocalLink 80 (BaltimoreLink) provide local bus service along Belvedere Avenue, providing residents with a convenient connection to the Rogers Avenue Metro station, as well as service to Downtown Baltimore (south), or northwest to Reisterstown Plaza and Sinai Hospital.
