= Fort Garrison =

- U.S. National Register of Historic Places
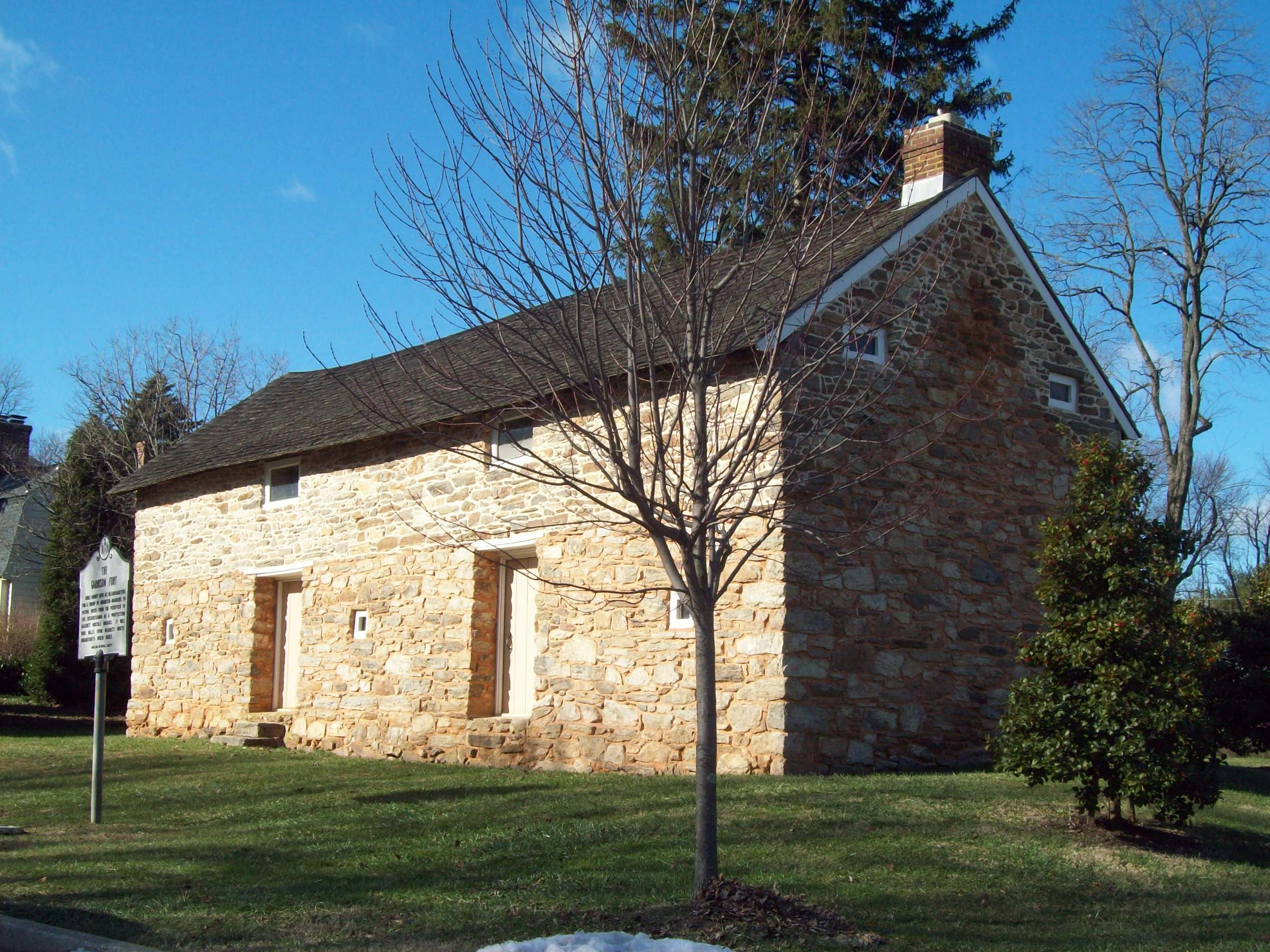
- Fort Garrison, December 2009

- Location within Maryland Location within the United States
- Nearest city: Stevenson, Maryland
- Coordinates: 39°23′56″N 76°42′28″W
- Area: .341 acres (0.138 ha)
- Built: 1695 circa
- Architectural style: Stone Blockhouse
- NRHP reference No.: 71000368
- Added to NRHP: January 25, 1971

Fort Garrison, also known as Oulton's Garrison, Risteau's Garrison, and Olton's Garrison, is a historic fortification building located at Stevenson, Baltimore County, Maryland on Garrison Farms Court. It is a rectangular fieldstone building built about 1695. The fort was built to serve as a stronghold against attacks by Native Americans and was used during the French and Indian War. It is approximately 48 feet long and 18 feet wide with one large stone fireplace. Modifications in the early-19th century raised the height of the fort building adding a second story loft and a wood shingle roof. It was constructed following a 1693 order from Governor Francis Nicholson and his Council. The property was acquired in 1965 by the Baltimore County Department of Recreation and Parks.

It was listed on the National Register of Historic Places in 1971.

In 2019, the Maryland Historical Trust removed a sign at Fort Garrison after officials received complaints over the use of the term "hostile Indians". The language, dating back to 1934, was removed on the basis of bias against Native Americans.
