= Dumbarton Historic District =

Historic district in Maryland, United States

- U.S. National Register of Historic Places
- U.S. Historic district
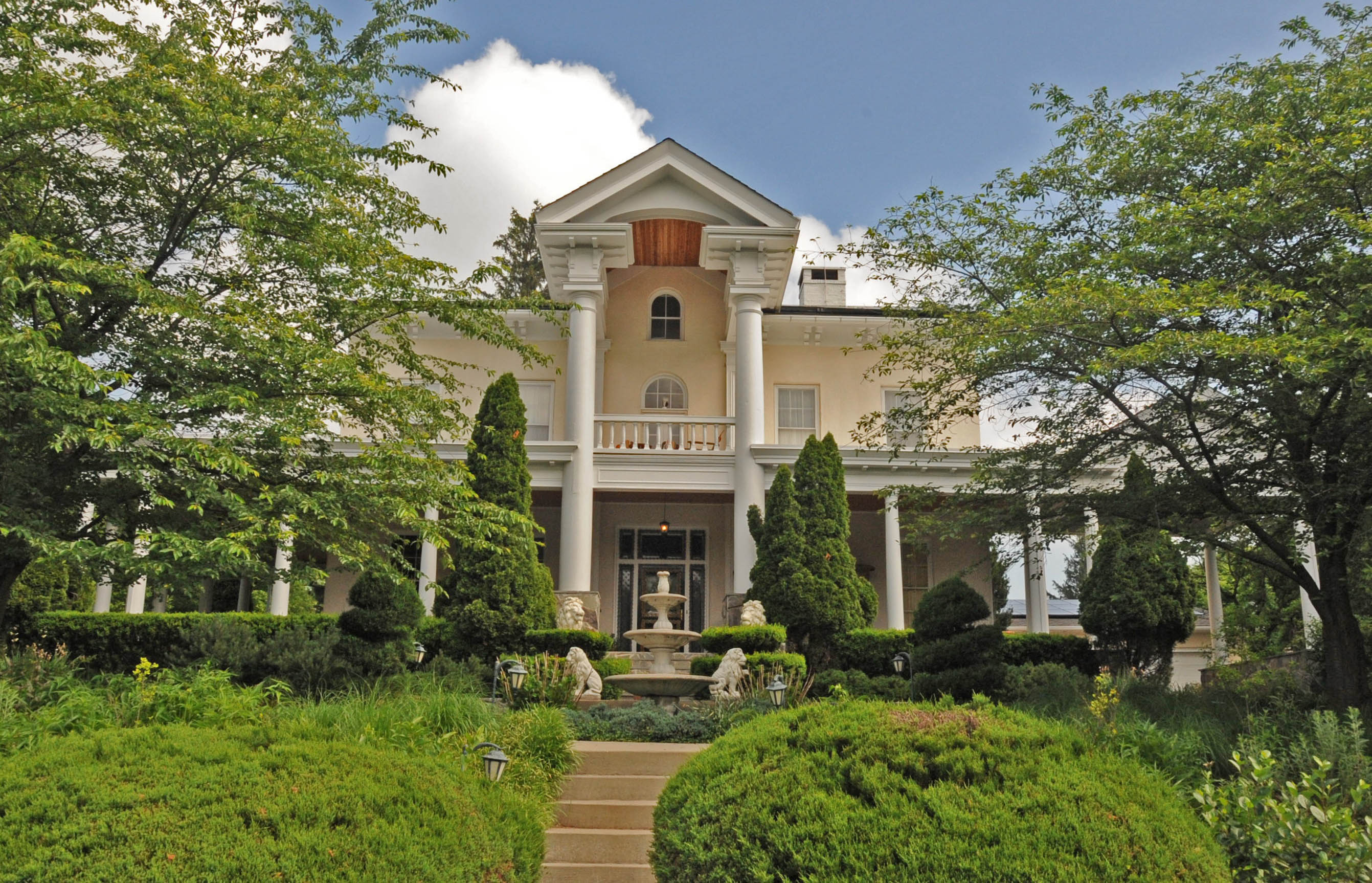

- Location within Maryland Location within the United States
- Location: Roughly bounded by Park Heights Ave., Slade Ave., Seven Mile La., and Old Court Rd., Pikesville, Maryland
- Coordinates: 39°22′36.95″N 76°42′36.93″W
- Area: 70 acres (28 ha)
- Architect: Schwartzman, Daniel; et al.
- Architectural style: Late 19th And 20th Century Revivals, Ranch
- NRHP reference No.: 09001172
- Added to NRHP: December 30, 2009

Dumbarton Historic District is a national historic district in Pikesville, Baltimore County, Maryland, United States. The suburban subdivision features curvilinear streets, generously sized lots, and naturalistic landscaping that generally reflect design principles associated with Frederick Law Olmsted. These features characterized the Roland Park Company's seminal developments. Many of subdivision's original residents were prominent Jewish merchants and industrialists, most of whom were of German descent.

It was added to the National Register of Historic Places in 2009.

== See also ==
- History of the Jews in Baltimore
- History of the Germans in Baltimore
