= Mettam Memorial Baptist Church =

Historic church in Maryland, United States

- U.S. National Register of Historic Places
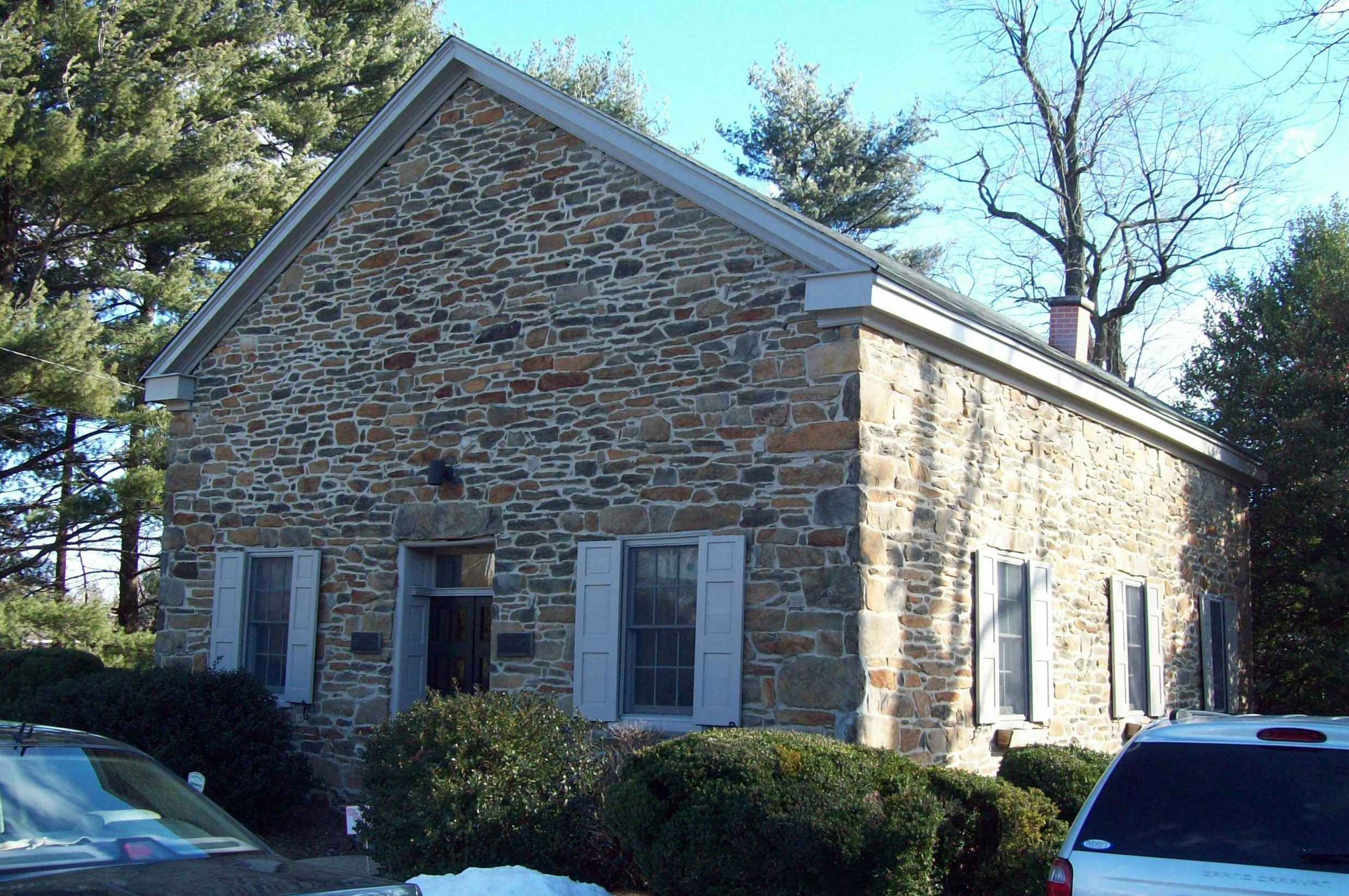
- Mettam Memorial Baptist Church, December 2009

- Location within Maryland Location within the United States
- Location: Old Court Rd. between Sudbrook and Reisterstown Rds., Pikesville, Maryland
- Coordinates: 39°22′41″N 76°43′10″W
- Area: 1 acre (0.40 ha)
- Built: 1835
- NRHP reference No.: 75000867
- Added to NRHP: April 24, 1975

Mettam Memorial Baptist Church is a historic Baptist church located at Pikesville, Baltimore County, Maryland. It is a 1 1/2-story gable-front stone structure measuring 30-by-40-foot (9.1 by 12.2 m) and built in 1835. It was renovated in 1965–1966 by the Pikesville Lions Club. The church sits on an acre of ground which includes a cemetery. The building is named for its first pastor, Joseph Mettam. The congregation joined with five others to found the Maryland Baptist Union Association, later the Baptist State Mission Board of Maryland.

It was listed on the National Register of Historic Places in 1975.
