= Grey Rock Mansion =

- U.S. National Register of Historic Places
- Location within Maryland Location within the United States
- Location: 400 Grey Rock Road, Pikesville, Maryland
- Coordinates: 39°23′38″N 76°44′15″W
- Built: 1923-1955
- Architect: Benjamin A. Frank
- NRHP reference No.: 100009110
- Added to NRHP: July 10, 2023

Grey Rock Mansion is a historic mansion in Pikesville, Maryland, United States, located at 400 Grey Rock Road. The original property was improved in the late 1850s on what was the ancestral homestead of John Eager Howard with a large Italian country estate mansion. In the 1930s the mansion was extensively renovated. The mansion currently has an over 10,000 square feet area, and is used primarily as an event and wedding venue. It was listed on the National Register of Historic Places in 2023.

== History ==
This property is the location of the historic Howard family homestead. Joshua Howard, one of the first settlers of Baltimore County was granted land there at the end of the 1600s. It was the birthplace of John Eager Howard, a three term Maryland governor, prior a member of the Continental Congress, a Colonel in the Revolutionary War and later a vice-presidential candidate. Howard is mentioned in a lyric of the Maryland state song, Maryland, My Maryland. A monument is dedicated to him is at the center face of Grey Rock Mansion on the front lawn.

The Howard descendants sold the property to Dr. Richard H. Maynard in 1857 who constructed an Italian Villa style mansion there between 1857 and 1861. It was named Grey Rock for use of the local natural grey rock in its construction. It had a stucco exterior and was designed by the famous Baltimore architect Norris Garshom Starkweather who also designed many other residences for prominent Baltimore families.

The property was purchased by A. Ray and Ethel Epstein Katz in 1923 who extensively renovated it during the 1930s. The architect was Benjamin Frank. Ethel was the daughter of Jacob Epstein, founder of Baltimore Bargain Basement, which was the fourth largest wholesale business in the nation. He was also one of Baltimore's more prominent philanthropists whom helped establish what would become the Associated Jewish Charities and the Baltimore Museum of Art where he sat on the Board of Directors. His personal art collection was one of the founding collections of the museum. Epstein also raised funds for the establishment of the Johns Hopkins Homewood campus.

The mansion was transformed to Greek Renaissance or Classical Revival style and remains so to this day. Its exterior front portico was redone with six columns and balustrade to resemble George Washington's estate at Mount Vernon. Also to resemble Mount Vernon, the portico was raised to the second floor and widened to fully enclose the front porch. A ballroom was added and the dining room was doubled in size. The mansion is now three stories with 10,659 square feet gross of building area. The interior renovations by Ethel Katz and executed by Benjamin Frank replicated several famous historic houses from the 1700s. Interior renovations included detailed wood carvings copying English mansions on display in museums. The library was paneled in dark native pine to replicate of the Sutton Scarsdale Room from Derbyshire, England from 1724 to 1727, exhibited in the Philadelphia Museum of Art. The Terrace room at Grey Rock is a replica of a room from Wrightington Hall, a Tudor mansion in Lancashire, England, completed circa 1748, with the original room acquired and exhibited in the Philadelphia Museum of Art.

== Sources ==
- Maryland Historical Magazine - June 1955
- Jacob Epstein
- John Eager Howard Monument
- Room from Wrightington Hall - Philadelphia Museum of Art
- Sutton Scarsdale Room - Philadelphia Museum of Art
