= Rockland Historic District (Brooklandville, Maryland) =

Historic district in Maryland, United States

- U.S. National Register of Historic Places
- U.S. Historic district
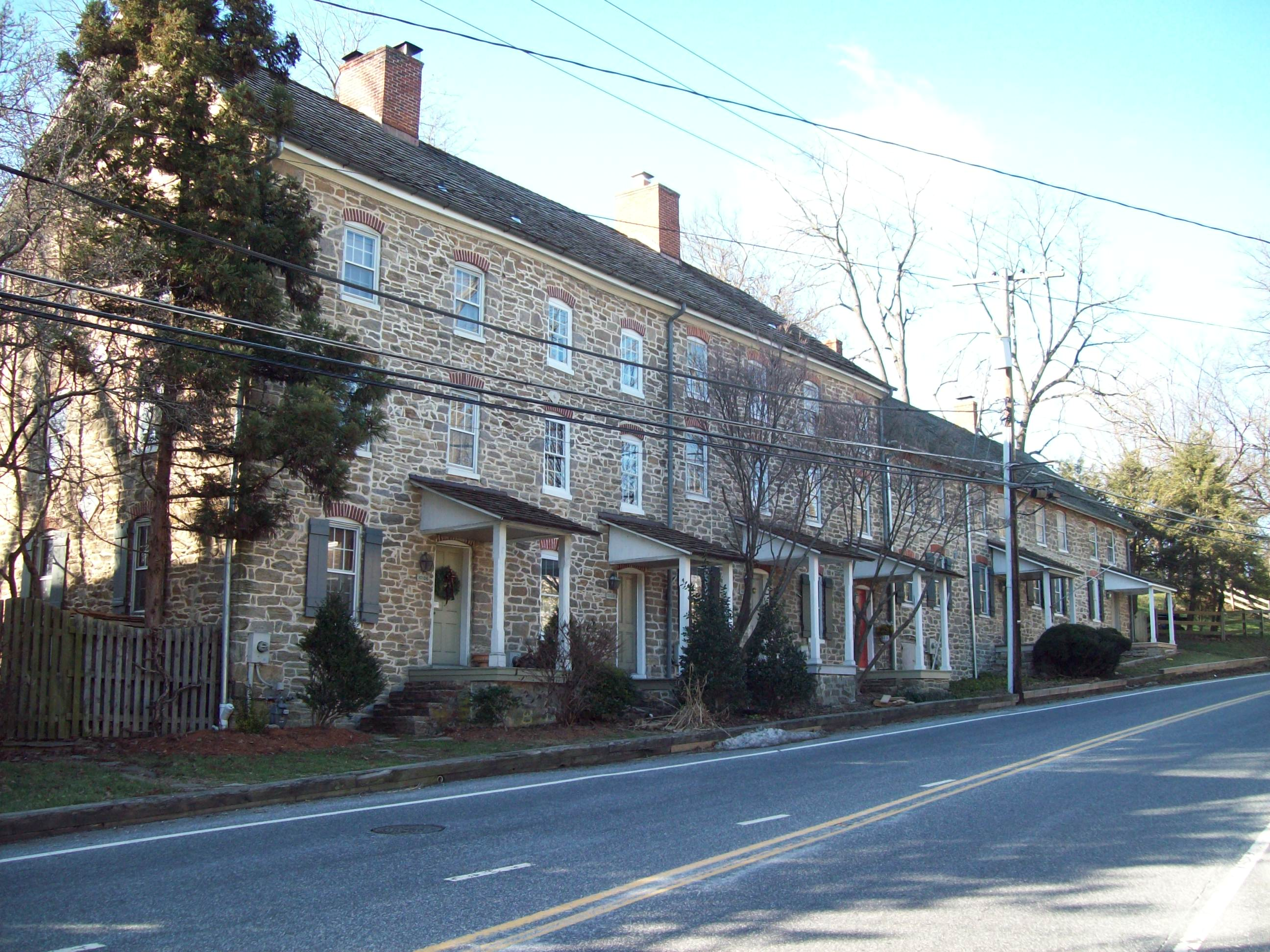
- Rockland Historic District-Rowhouses, December 2009

- Location within Maryland Location within the United States
- Location: Both sides of Falls Rd. (MD 25) at jct. of Old Court Rd. (MD 133), Brooklandville, Maryland
- Coordinates: 39°24′3″N 76°40′6″W
- Area: 24 acres (9.7 ha)
- Built: 1791
- Architectural style: Federal
- NRHP reference No.: 73000899
- Added to NRHP: April 11, 1973

Rockland Historic District is a national historic district at Brooklandville, Baltimore County, Maryland, United States. It is located at the intersection of Old Court Road and Falls Road, where Old Court turns into Ruxton Road. There are 15 buildings in the area, including a general store, tavern, the shell of a blacksmith shop, a carriage house, several log buildings, a group of stone rowhouses, the Rockland Grist Mill, and an 18th-century dwelling. It is one of the surviving examples of a small, quiet, sylvan community of the early 19th century.

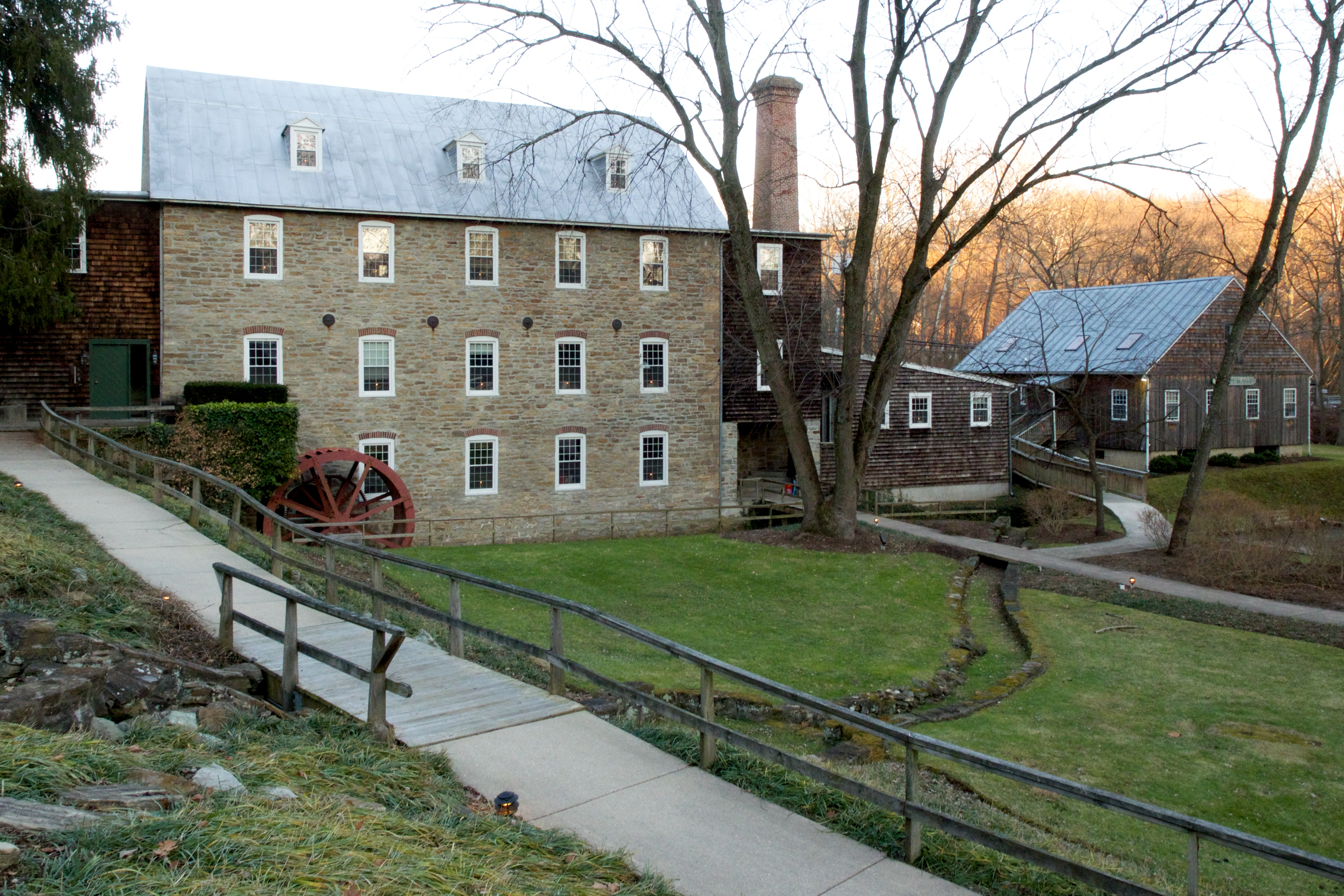
Rockland Grist Mill - Old Court and Falls Road, Lutherville, Maryland

Rockland Grist Mill dates to at least 1810, and has been used for a variety of purposes, including manufacture of calico, cotton spinning, production of wooden toys and artificial silk, food preservation additives and jewelry cleaning solutions.

The area was added to the National Register of Historic Places in 1973, and underwent restoration in 1982.
