= Park Circle Historic District =

Historic district in Maryland, United States

- U.S. National Register of Historic Places
- U.S. Historic district
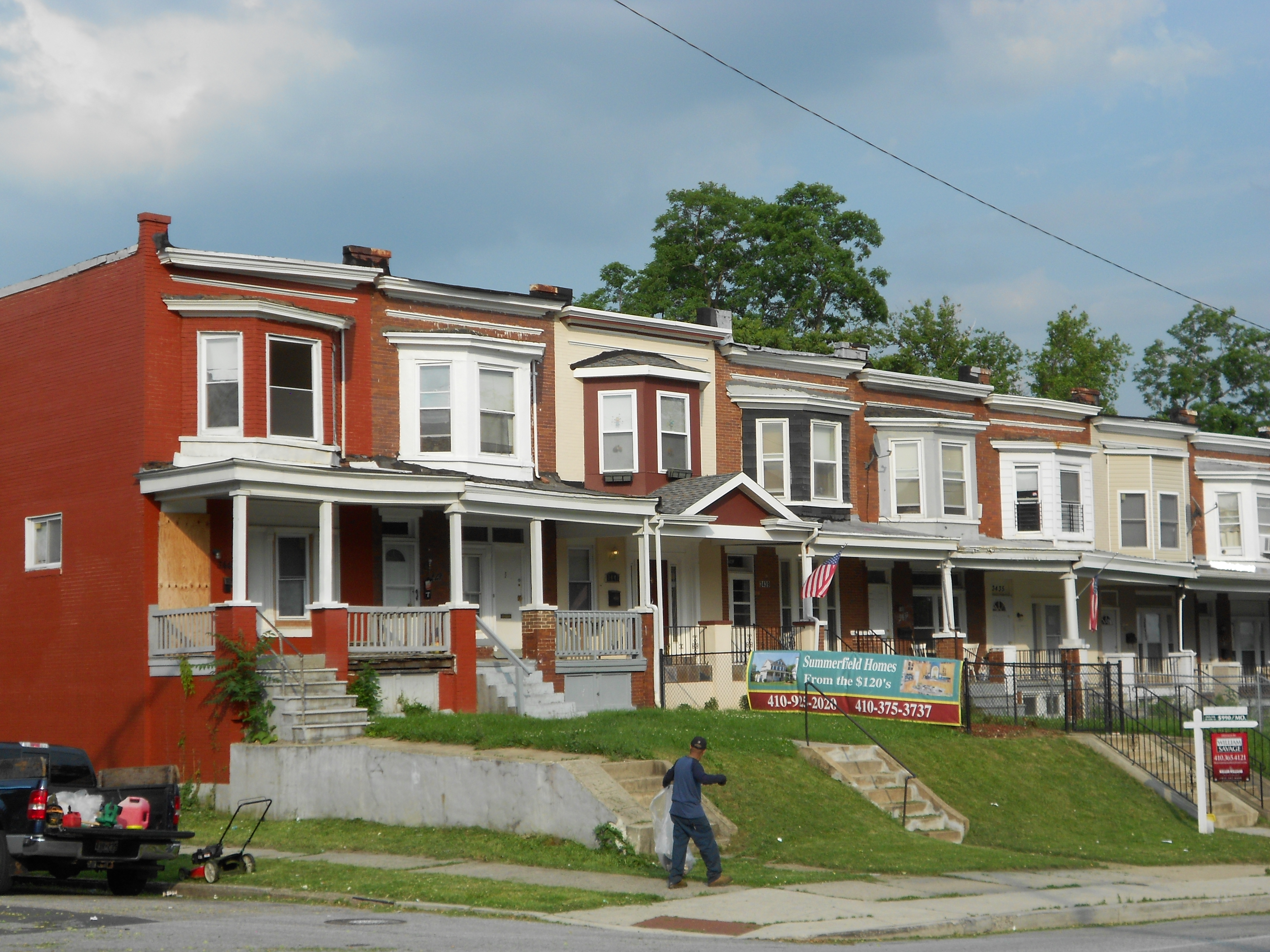
- 3400 block Reistertown Rd., Park Circle Historic District, May 2013

- Location within Baltimore Location within Maryland Location within the United States
- Location: Roughly bounded by Overview Ave., Shirley Ave., Cottage Ave., and Henry G. Parks Jr. Circle, Baltimore, Maryland
- Coordinates: 39°19′40″N 76°39′31″W
- Area: 200 acres (81 ha)
- Built: 1900
- Architectural style: Colonial Revival, Mission/spanish Revival
- NRHP reference No.: 08001124
- Added to NRHP: December 4, 2008

Park Circle Historic District is a national historic district located at Baltimore, Maryland. The district is historically important as an example of an early suburban Jewish neighborhood. Jewish immigrants from Eastern Europe began to settle in the neighborhood, moving from East Baltimore. This set the pattern for the future expansion of Baltimore's Jewish community.

It was listed on the National Register of Historic Places in 2008.
