= Green Spring Valley Historic District =

Historic district in Maryland, United States

- U.S. National Register of Historic Places
- U.S. Historic district
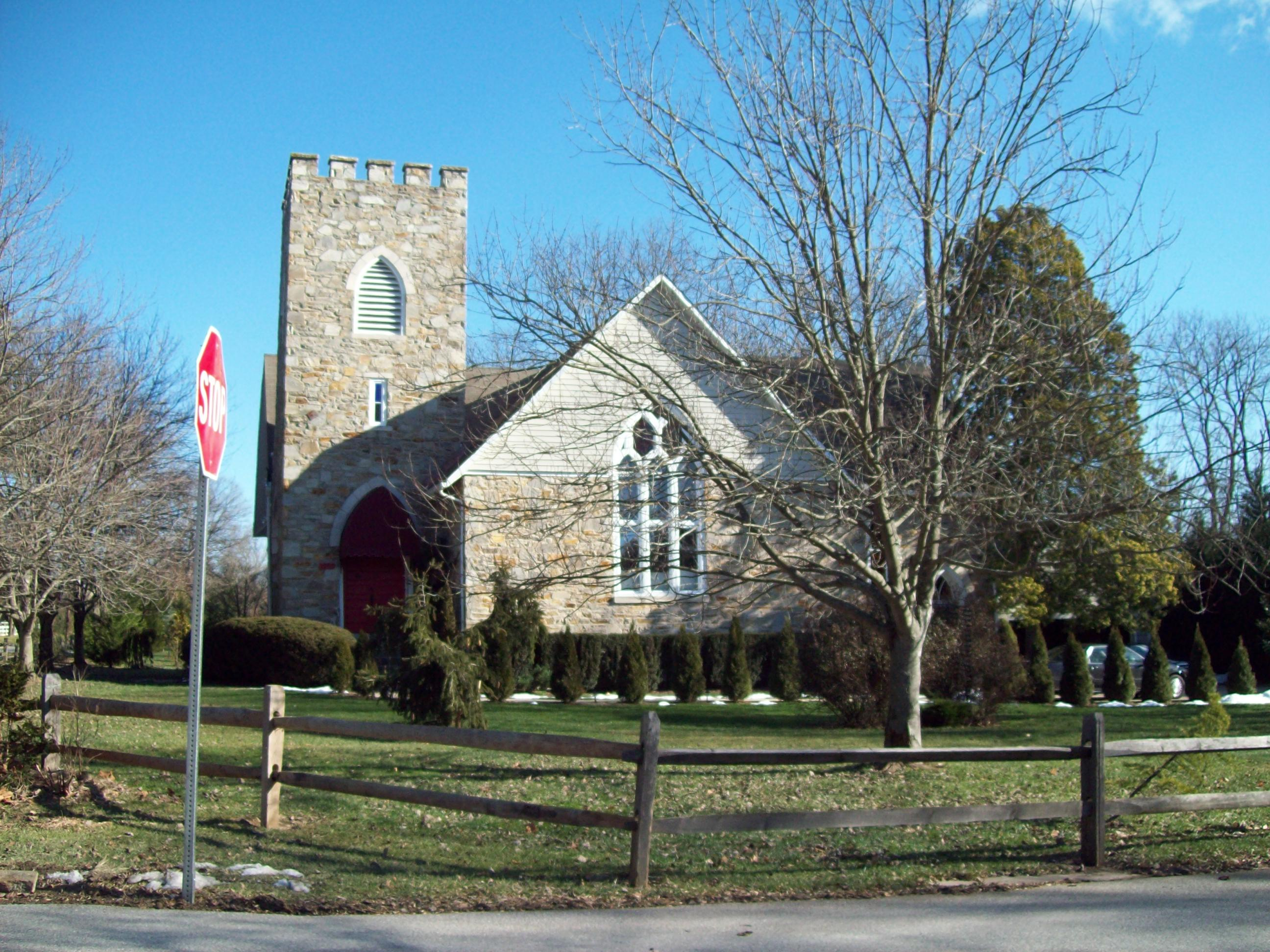
- The former Stevenson Methodist Church, now converted into a residence

- Location within Maryland Location within the United States
- Nearest city: Stevenson and Owings Mills, Maryland
- Coordinates: 39°24′55″N 76°42′46″W
- Area: 4,800 acres (1,900 ha)
- Built: 1832
- Architectural style: Late 19th And 20th Century Revivals, Early Republic, Late Victorian
- NRHP reference No.: 80001797
- Added to NRHP: October 3, 1980

Green Spring Valley Historic District is a national historic district near Stevenson in Baltimore County, Maryland, United States. It is a suburban area of Baltimore that acquires significance from the collection of 18th, 19th, and early 20th century buildings. The park-like setting retains a late 19th-early 20th century atmosphere. At the turn of the 20th century, the Maryland Hunt Cup and the Grand National Maryland steeplechase races were run over various parts of the valley. The Maryland Hunt Cup, which began as a competition between the Green Spring Valley Hunt and the Elkridge Hunt, traditionally started at Brooklandwood, the previous home of Charles Carrol of Carrollton (later St. Paul’s school) with the finish across Valley Road at Oakdene, at that time the home of Thomas Deford, which remains a private residence

The buildings reflect major architectural styles popular in the United States from the Neoclassical of the 18th century to the Georgian and other revivals of the pre-1930 period and range from modest to elaborate in size. The district's Stevenson railway station is in "good repair."

Several church buildings serve as important contributing properties within the district, including St. Thomas' Episcopal Church, Green Springs Methodist Church, Stevenson Methodist Church, and Sater's Baptist Church. The oldest of these buildings is St. Thomas', where construction started in 1743; the parish has used the building without interruption since its completion. The oldest extant Baptist church building in the United States, Sater's was built for the first Baptist congregation to be established in the Province of Maryland. The congregation first worshipped in the building's original section in 1746, although the building was substantially modified in the 1860s after suffering extensive deterioration.

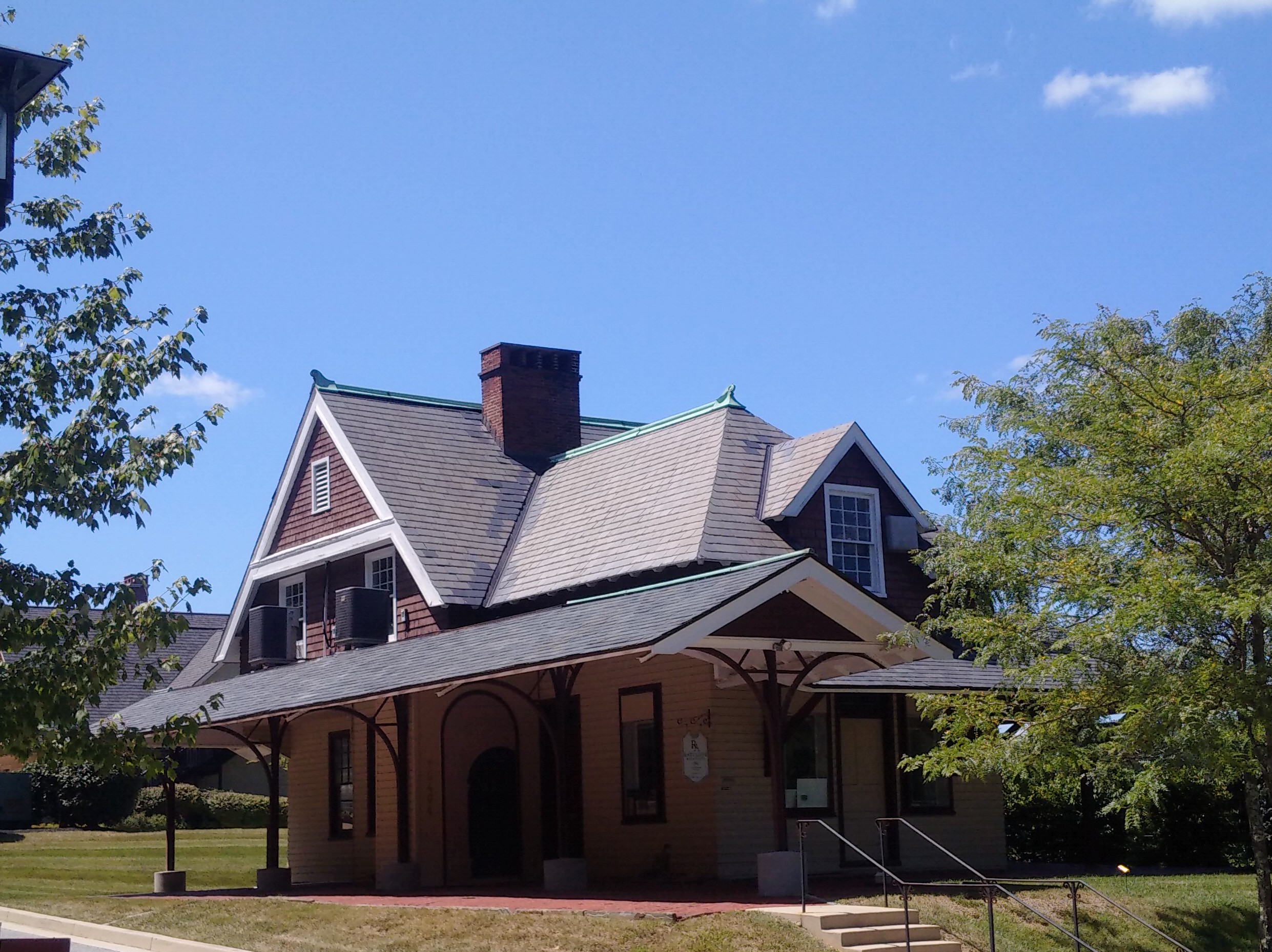
The former Stevenson railway station

Greenspring Methodist Church's building, a small Carpenter Gothic structure, was constructed in 1872; the landowner donated it to the community's black church, and it came into the possession of the present congregation in 1908. The former Stevenson Methodist Church is a stone Gothic Revival building; its cornerstone was laid in 1905, although two years passed before the building was dedicated.

The district was designated and added to the National Register of Historic Places in 1980. Its boundaries encompass 282 buildings (148 contributing and 134 non-contributing) spread over an area of 4,800 acres (1,900 ha).

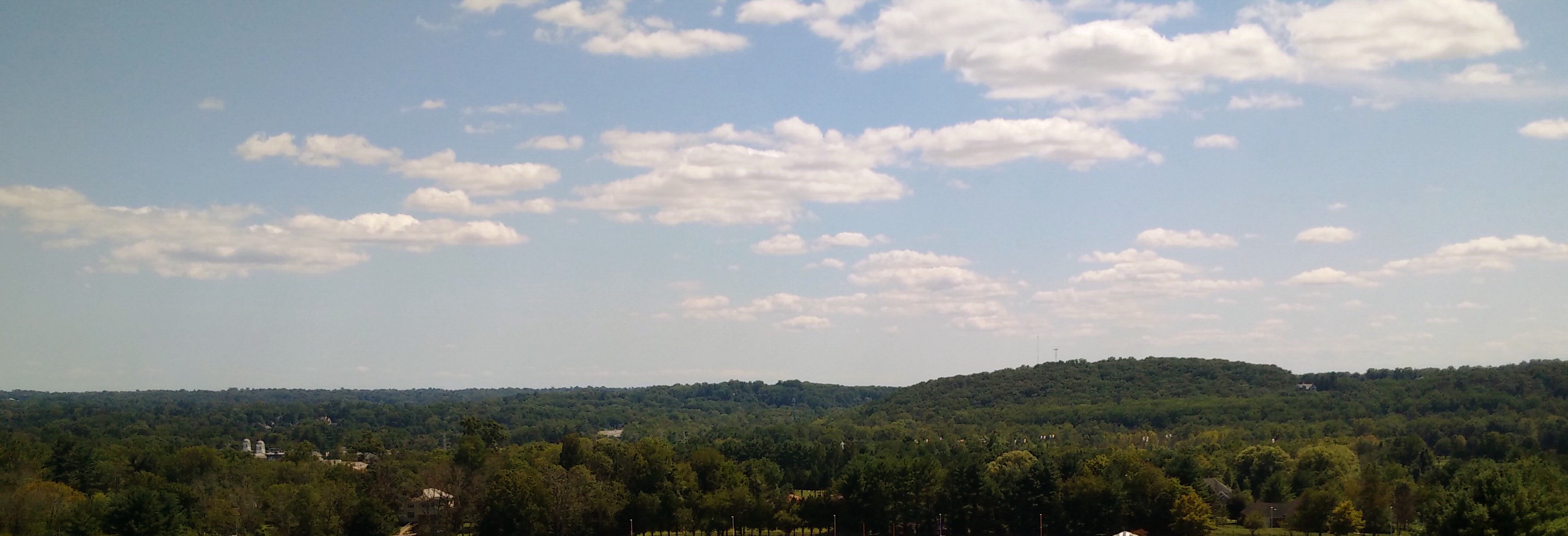
The Greenspring Valley area
