= Brooklandville, Maryland =

Unincorporated community in Maryland, United States

- Unincorporated community
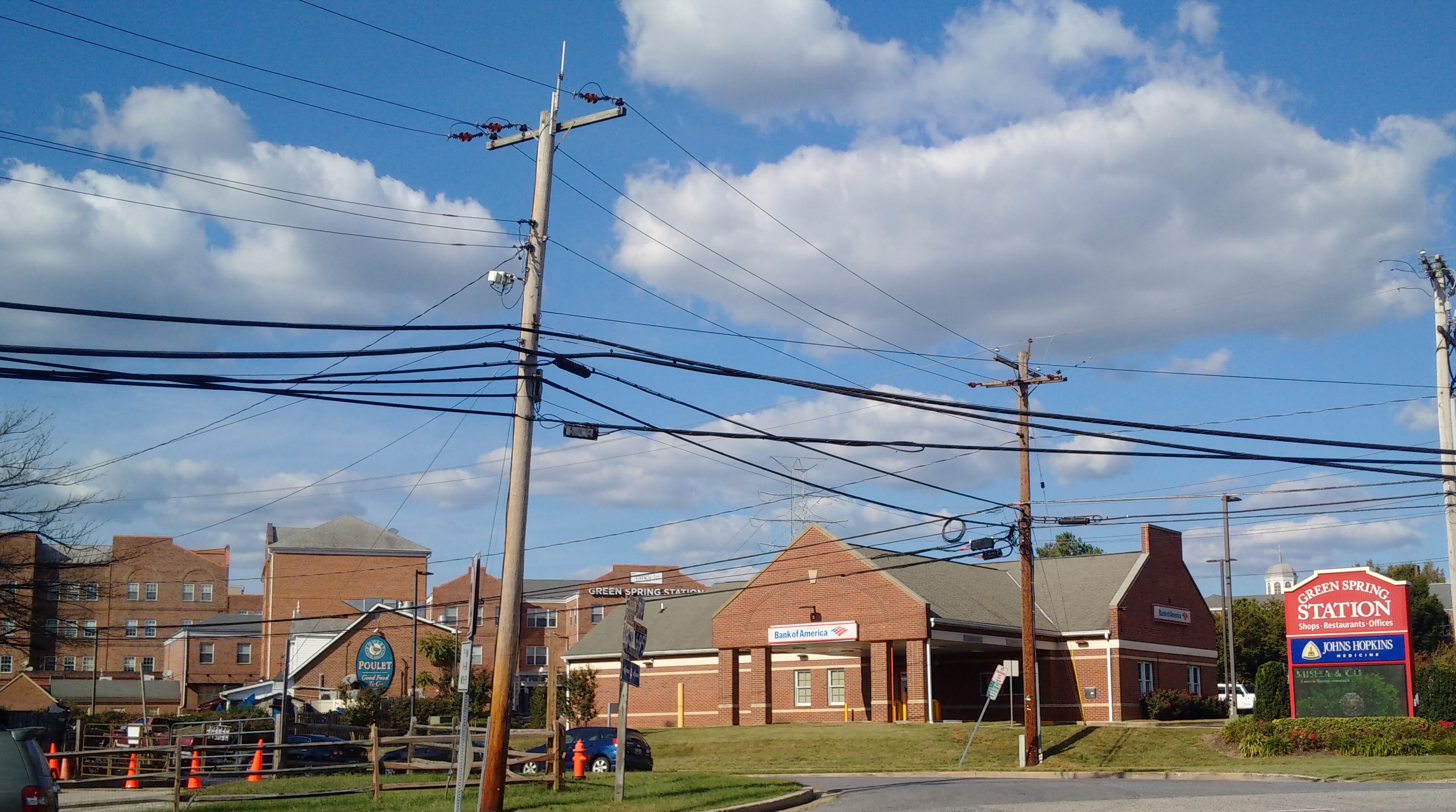
- View of Green Spring Station complex from intersection of Falls and Joppa Roads

- Location within the State of Maryland Brooklandville, Maryland (the United States)
- Coordinates: 39°25′13″N 76°40′12″W
- Country: United States
- State: Maryland
- County: Baltimore
- Time zone: UTC−5 (Eastern (EST))
  - Summer (DST): UTC−4 (EDT)
- ZIP codes: 21022

Brooklandville is an unincorporated community in Baltimore County, Maryland, United States near the intersection of Jones Falls Expressway and the Baltimore Beltway. The general area is a part of Lutherville, and some addresses in the area are considered to be in Lutherville, though Brooklandville has a postal zone and post office of its own (zip code 21022). Some notable landmarks in the area, including the St. Paul's Schools are technically within Brooklandville, as noted by their mailing addresses. However, addresses within the main office complex in the area, Green Spring Station, are considered to be within Lutherville.

== Green Spring Station ==
The Green Spring Station complex is located at the intersection of Falls and Joppa Roads, near the interchange of I-695 and the Jones Falls Expressway, and is also bordered by Greenspring Valley Road, though the segment of this road that runs through the complex is identified as Station Drive. Seminary Avenue also begins very close to the location.

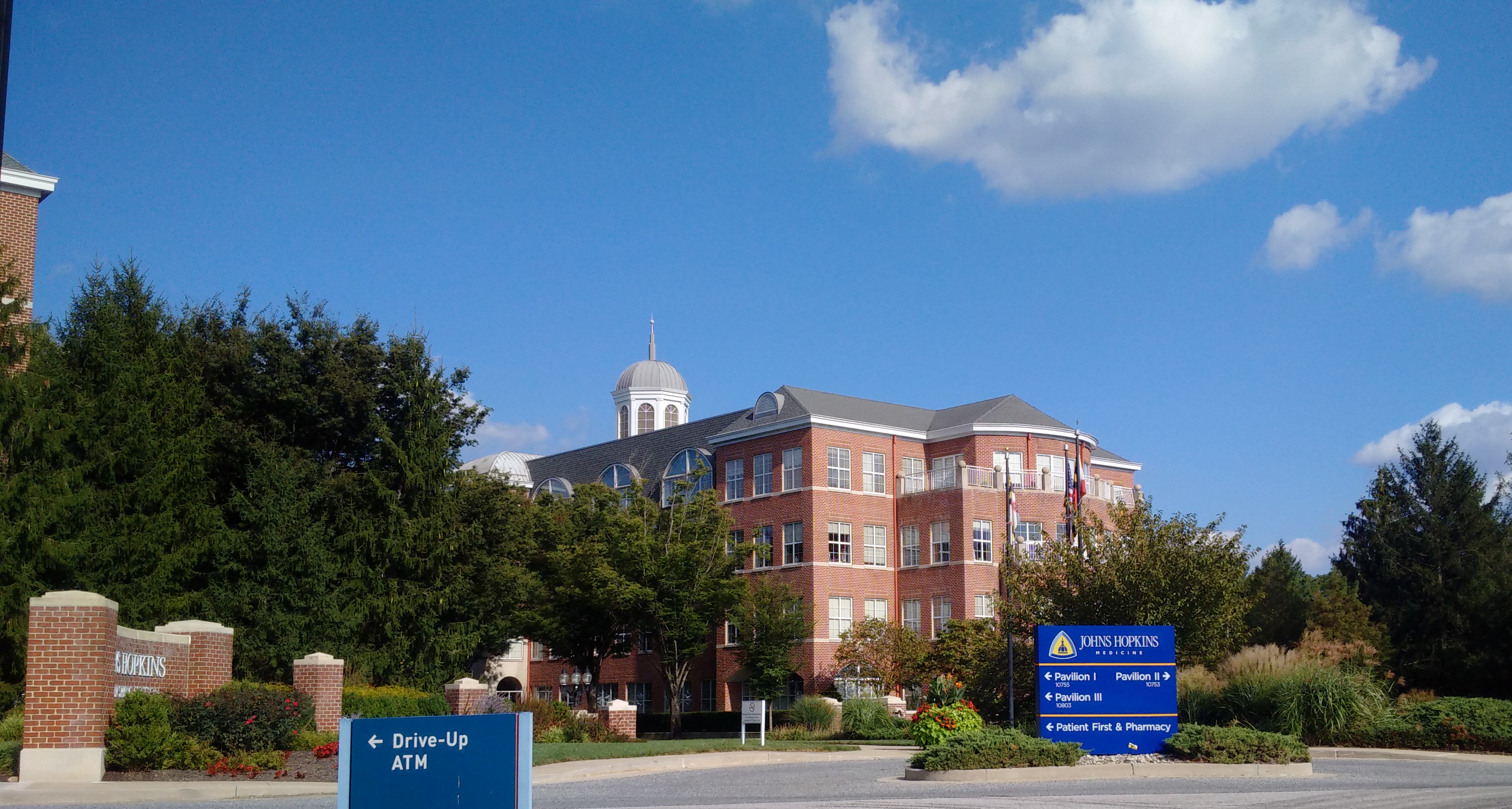
Part of Johns Hopkins Hospital's campus at Green Spring Station

The complex has offices for several large companies, as well as some upscale shops, restaurants, banks, and medical offices. The most notable company with facilities at Green Spring Station is Johns Hopkins Hospital, which has a satellite branch that takes up a large portion of the grounds, and has been operating at this location since 1994.

== Maryvale Preparatory School ==
Maryvale Preparatory is an independent Catholic girls' school. It was used as a filming location for the 1997 Clint Eastwood movie Absolute Power, as the Washington, D.C. mansion of Walter Sullivan.

== Transportation ==
=== Roads ===
The main roads in the Brooklandville area are Falls Road, Greenspring Valley Road, Joppa Road, and Old Court Road.

=== Public transportation ===
The Green Spring Station complex on weekdays is served by the Maryland Transit Administration's Bus Route 60 every 40–60 minutes. This bus links to the Mt. Washington Light Rail Stop and the Reisterstown Plaza Metro Subway Station.

Free service to Green Spring Station from the Johns Hopkins Medical Campus is available on the hospital's Green Spring Shuttle hourly on weekdays.

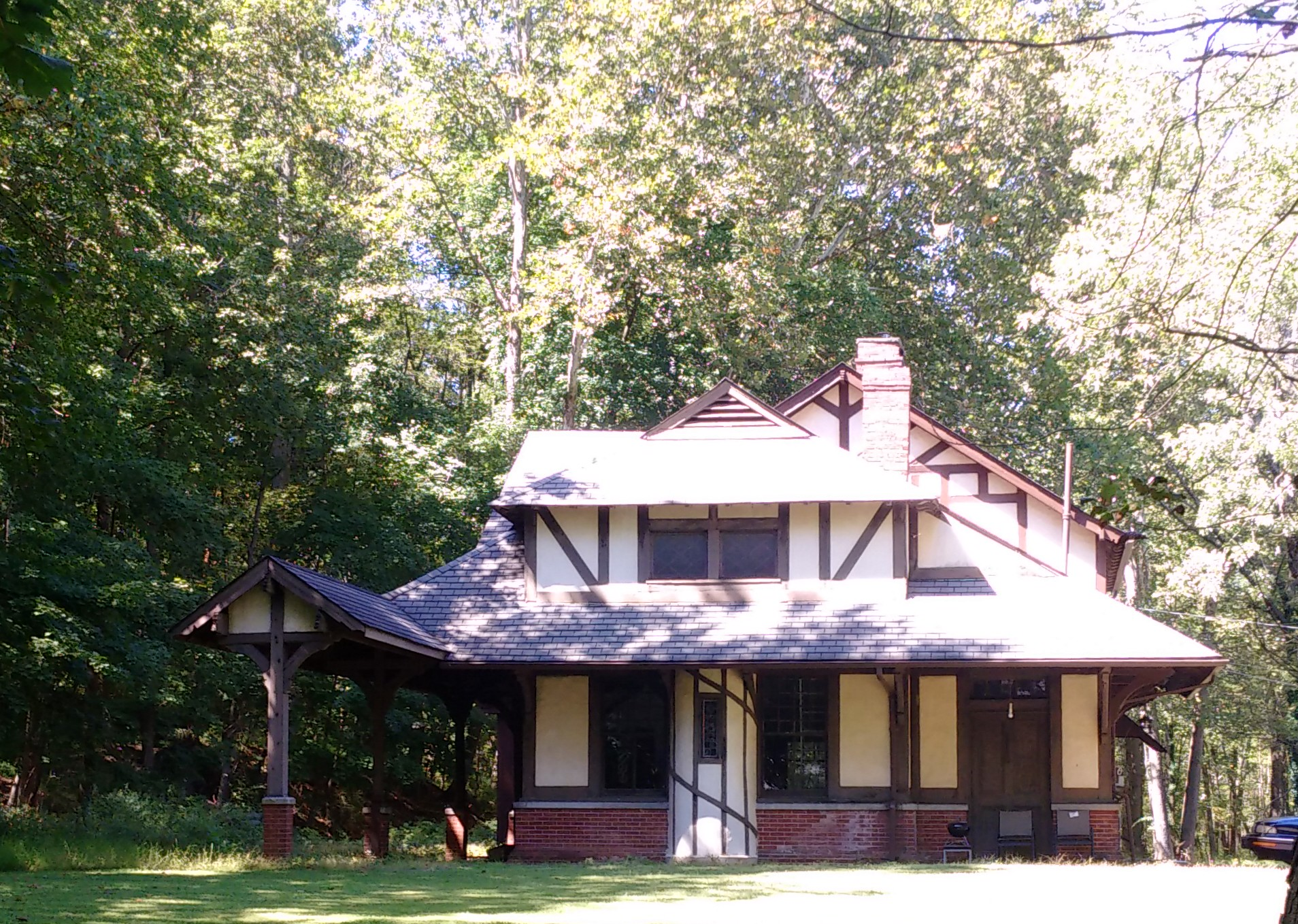
Former Brooklandville train station

From 1830 until 1955, Brooklandville was served by the Green Spring Valley Branch of the old Northern Central Railway (later part of the Pennsylvania Railroad). The former station still stands, now a private residence.

== Notable residents ==
- Steve Krulevitz (born 1951) - American-Israeli tennis player

== See also ==
- Brooklandville House (The Valley Inn) (historic restaurant and tavern. Built c. 1832)
- The Cloisters (Cloisters Castle) (historic home and rental facility. Built c. 1930)
