= Garrison, Maryland =

- Census-designated place
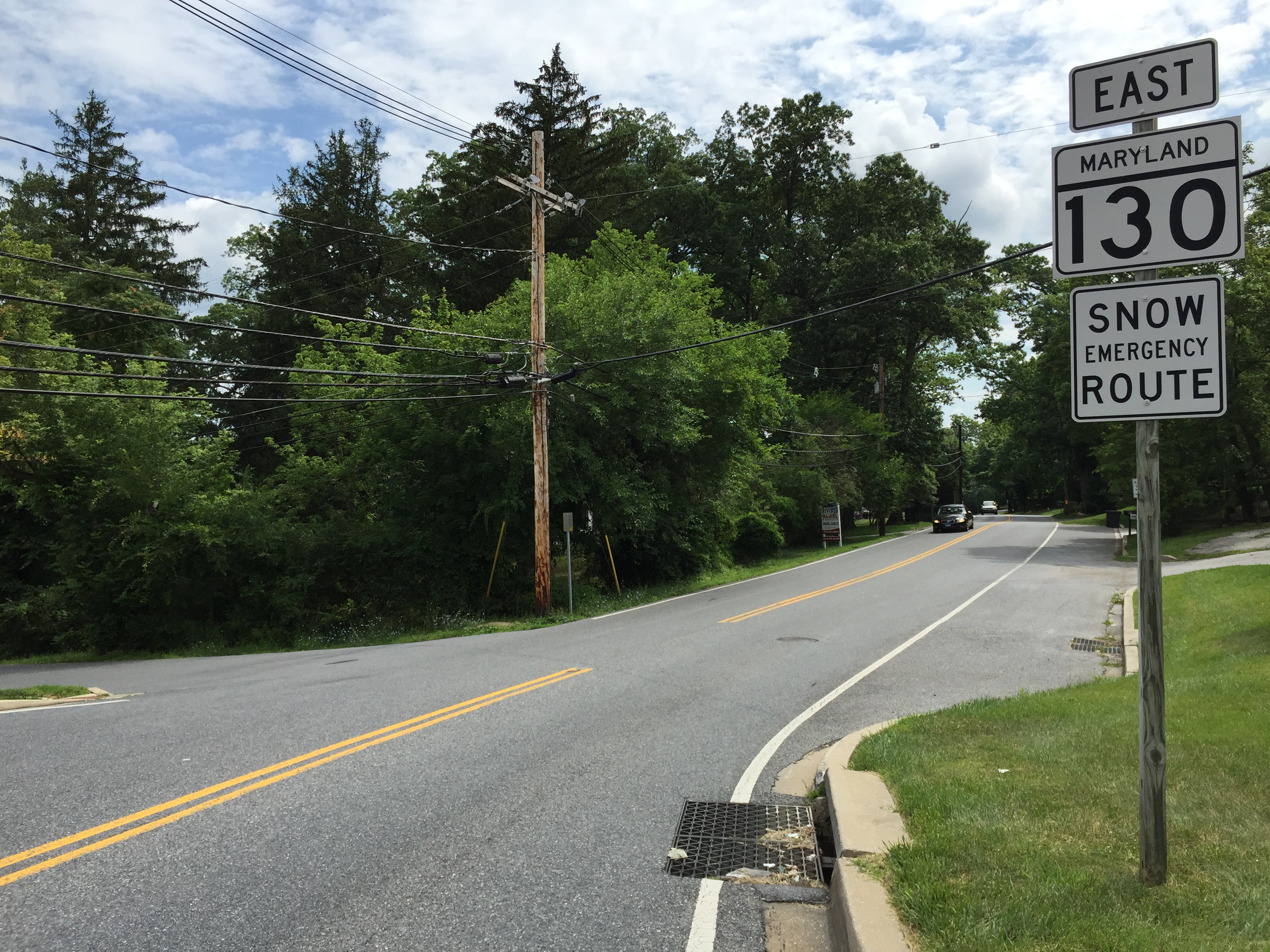
- Greenspring Valley Road at Turnlee Road in Garrison, Maryland

- Location of Garrison, Maryland
- Coordinates: 39°24′4″N 76°45′4″W
- Country: United States
- State: Maryland
- County: Baltimore

Area
  - Total: 3.16 sq mi (8.19 km^{2})
  - Land: 3.16 sq mi (8.18 km^{2})
  - Water: 0.0039 sq mi (0.01 km^{2})
- Elevation: 443 ft (135 m)

Population (2020)
  - Total: 9,487
  - Density: 3,003.8/sq mi (1,159.76/km^{2})
- Time zone: UTC−5 (Eastern (EST))
  - Summer (DST): UTC−4 (EDT)
- ZIP code: 21055
- Area code: 410
- FIPS code: 24-31625
- GNIS feature ID: 0590284

Garrison is a census-designated place (CDP) in Baltimore County, Maryland, United States, adjacent to Owings Mills. It consists mainly of the McDonogh area and Valley Centre. The population was 8,823 at the 2010 census.

== Geography ==
Garrison is located at 39°24′4″N 76°45′4″W (39.401055, −76.751073).

According to the United States Census Bureau, the CDP has a total area of 3.2 square miles (8.2 km^{2}), of which 0.12% is water.

== Demographics ==
Historical population
| Census | Pop. | Note | %± |
|---|---|---|---|
| 1990 | 5,045 | | — |
| 2000 | 7,969 | | 58.0% |
| 2010 | 8,823 | | 10.7% |
| 2020 | 9,487 | | 7.5% |

=== Racial and ethnic composition ===
Garrison CDP, Maryland – Racial and ethnic composition Note: the US Census treats Hispanic/Latino as an ethnic category. This table excludes Latinos from the racial categories and assigns them to a separate category. Hispanics/Latinos may be of any race.
| Race / Ethnicity (NH = Non-Hispanic) | Pop 2000 | Pop 2010 | Pop 2020 | % 2000 | % 2010 | % 2020 |
|---|---|---|---|---|---|---|
| White alone (NH) | 6,087 | 5,302 | 4,257 | 76.38% | 60.09% | 44.87% |
| Black or African American alone (NH) | 1,343 | 2,609 | 4,070 | 16.85% | 29.57% | 42.90% |
| Native American or Alaska Native alone (NH) | 10 | 19 | 11 | 0.13% | 0.22% | 0.12% |
| Asian alone (NH) | 267 | 380 | 413 | 3.35% | 4.31% | 4.35% |
| Native Hawaiian or Pacific Islander alone (NH) | 1 | 1 | 0 | 0.01% | 0.01% | 0.00% |
| Other race alone (NH) | 16 | 23 | 37 | 0.20% | 0.26% | 0.39% |
| Mixed race or Multiracial (NH) | 64 | 173 | 304 | 0.80% | 1.96% | 3.20% |
| Hispanic or Latino (any race) | 181 | 316 | 395 | 2.27% | 3.58% | 4.16% |
| Total | 7,969 | 8,823 | 9,487 | 100.00% | 100.00% | 100.00% |

=== 2020 census ===
As of the 2020 census, Garrison had a population of 9,487. The median age was 36.0 years. 22.9% of residents were under the age of 18 and 17.8% of residents were 65 years of age or older. For every 100 females, there were 91.9 males, and for every 100 females age 18 and over, there were 84.2 males age 18 and over.

99.2% of residents lived in urban areas, while 0.8% lived in rural areas.

There were 3,880 households in Garrison, of which 28.3% had children under the age of 18 living in them. Of all households, 35.1% were married-couple households, 16.7% were households with a male householder and no spouse or partner present, and 41.6% were households with a female householder and no spouse or partner present. About 34.7% of all households were made up of individuals, and 14.3% had someone living alone who was 65 years of age or older.

There were 4,118 housing units, of which 5.8% were vacant. The homeowner vacancy rate was 1.0% and the rental vacancy rate was 5.9%.

=== 2000 census ===
As of the census of 2000, there were 7,969 people, 3,459 households, and 1,940 families residing in the CDP. The population density was 2,551.5 inhabitants per square mile (985.1/km^{2}). There were 3,696 housing units at an average density of 1,183.4 per square mile (456.9/km^{2}). The racial makeup of the CDP was 77.54% White, 17.09% African American, 0.13% Native American, 3.35% Asian, 0.01% Pacific Islander, 0.92% from other races, and 0.97% from two or more races. Hispanic or Latino of any race were 2.27% of the population. In 2000, 14% of Garrison residents identified as being of Russian American heritage. This was the second highest percentage of Russian Americans of any place in Maryland after Pikesville. The majority of them are of Jewish ancestry. 2% of Garrison's residents were of Ukrainian descent and 1% were descended from other Eastern European countries. 8% were German, 7% Polish, 5% Irish, 4% English, 3% Italian, 2% Lithuanian, and 2% French.

There were 3,459 households, out of which 25.7% had children under the age of 18 living with them, 42.0% were married couples living together, 10.8% had a female householder with no husband present, and 43.9% were non-families. 35.5% of all households were made up of individuals, and 6.3% had someone living alone who was 65 years of age or older. The average household size was 2.19 and the average family size was 2.90.

In the CDP, the population was spread out, with 22.0% under the age of 18, 10.3% from 18 to 24, 34.4% from 25 to 44, 23.5% from 45 to 64, and 9.8% who were 65 years of age or older. The median age was 34 years. For every 100 females, there were 98.3 males. For every 100 females age 18 and over, there were 94.9 males.

The median income for a household in the CDP was $56,520, and the median income for a family was $62,171. Males had a median income of $45,286 versus $37,472 for females. The per capita income for the CDP was $36,236. About 4.6% of families and 5.8% of the population were below the poverty line, including 7.4% of those under age 18 and 9.3% of those age 65 or over.

== Notable people ==
- William Cabell Bruce, U.S. senator from Maryland, buried at St. Thomas Episcopal Church Cemetery
- William Maxwell Wood, MD, USN, first Surgeon General of the United States Navy, buried at St. Thomas Episcopal Church Cemetery
- Thomas Cradock, an important colonial poet and local minister (St. Thomas's), buried at St. Thomas Episcopal Church Cemetery (see David Curtis Skaggs, ed., The Poetic Writings of Thomas Cradock, 1718-1770 (Newark: U Delaware Pr, 1983), 94n27).
