= Stevenson, Maryland =

Unincorporated community in Maryland, United States

- Unincorporated community
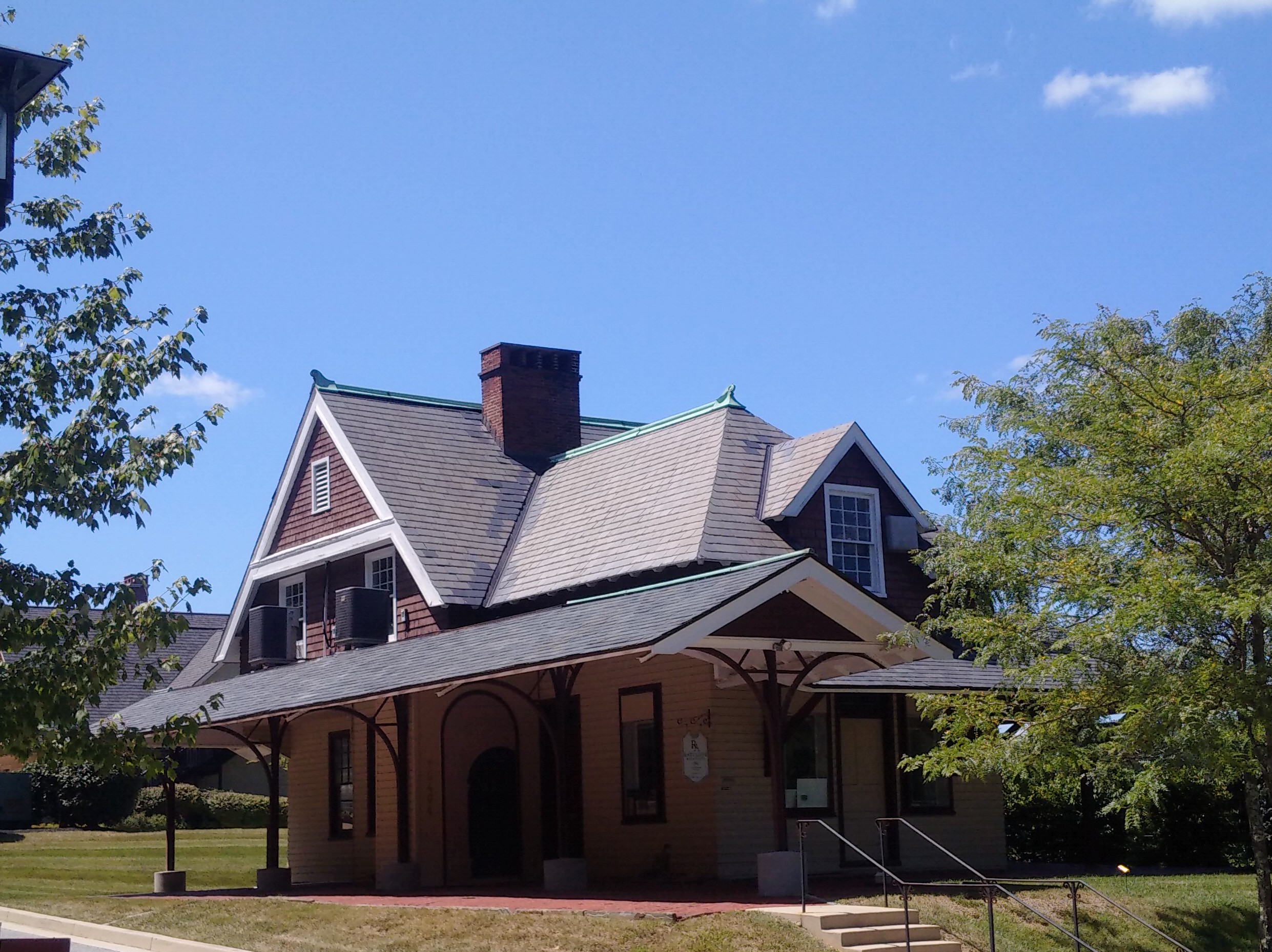
- The former Stevenson train station

- Location within the State of Maryland Stevenson, Maryland (the United States)
- Coordinates: 39°24′37″N 76°42′47″W
- Country: United States
- State: Maryland
- County: Baltimore
- Time zone: UTC−5 (Eastern (EST))
  - Summer (DST): UTC−4 (EDT)
- ZIP code: 21153

Stevenson is an unincorporated community located in the Green Spring Valley in Baltimore County, Maryland, United States. From 1830 until 1955, this community was served by the Green Spring Valley Branch of the old Northern Central Railway (later part of the Pennsylvania Railroad).

Primarily a residential area, it is the site of the main campus of Stevenson University (formerly Villa Julie College), which also has a campus in Owings Mills. It is also home to St. Timothy's School, an all-girls boarding and day high school. Fort Garrison was listed on the National Register of Historic Places in 1971.
