= National Register of Historic Places listings in Baltimore County, Maryland =

Location of Baltimore County in Maryland

Baltimore County, Maryland, United States, has 94 properties and districts listed on the National Register of Historic Places, including two National Historic Landmarks. Note that Baltimore County does not include the city of Baltimore, which is an independent city.

Latitude and longitude coordinates are provided for many National Register properties and districts; these locations may be seen together in a map.

Contents: Counties in Maryland
Allegany - Anne Arundel - Baltimore (city) - Baltimore County - Calvert - Caroline - Carroll - Cecil - Charles - Dorchester - Frederick - Garrett - Harford - Howard - Kent - Montgomery - Prince George's - Queen Anne's - Somerset - St. Mary's - Talbot - Washington - Wicomico - Worcester

This National Park Service list is complete through NPS recent listings posted August 21, 2026.

== Current listings ==
	Name on the Register	Image	Date listed	Location	City or town	Description
1	Anneslie Historic District	Anneslie Historic District	March 12, 2012 (#12000097)	Roughly bounded by York, Maplewood, and Windwood Rds., and Regester Ave. 39°22′33″N 76°36′16″W	Towson	
2	Auburn House	Auburn House	March 17, 1975 (#75000869)	Osler Dr. between Towsontown Boulevard and Stevenson Lane; 39°23′10″N 76°36′49″W	Towson	
3	Ballestone Mansion	Ballestone Mansion	June 18, 1975 (#75000866)	East of Essex on Back River Neck Rd. in Rocky Point Park; 39°15′08″N 76°25′03″W	Essex	Now known as the Ballestone-Stansbury House.
4	Baltimore County Courthouse	Baltimore County Courthouse	October 27, 1972 (#72000569)	Washington Ave. between Pennsylvania and Chesapeake Aves. 39°23′59″N 76°36′24″W	Towson	
5	Baltimore County Jail	Baltimore County Jail	August 26, 2009 (#09000644)	222 Courthouse Court; 39°23′52″N 76°36′29″W	Towson	
6	Baltimore County School No. 7	Baltimore County School No. 7	August 31, 2000 (#00001007)	200 Ashland Rd. 39°29′43″N 76°38′32″W	Cockeysville	
7	Bare Hills Historic District	Bare Hills Historic District	November 22, 2011 (#11000852)	Falls Rd. between Light Rail and north of Coppermine Terrace; 39°23′14″N 76°39′34″W	Towson	
8	Bare Hills House	Bare Hills House	August 6, 1980 (#80001793)	North of Baltimore at 6222 Falls Rd. 39°22′55″N 76°39′19″W	Towson	
9	Brooklandville House	Brooklandville House	November 23, 1977 (#77000682)	South of Brooklandville at Falls and Hillside Rds. 39°24′40″N 76°40′03″W	Brooklandville	
10	Brooklandwood	Brooklandwood	February 11, 1972 (#72000567)	Falls Rd. 39°25′50″N 76°40′36″W	Brooklandville	
11	Old Catonsville Historic District	Old Catonsville Historic District	December 27, 2002 (#02001573)	Between Edmondson, Frederick, Melvin, and Smithwood Aves. 39°16′20″N 76°44′40″W	Catonsville	
12	Caves Valley Historic District	Caves Valley Historic District	October 20, 1988 (#88001859)	Caves and Garrison Forest Rds., and Park Heights Ave. 39°26′30″N 76°44′53″W	Owings Mills	
13	Central Catonsville and Summit Park Historic District	Central Catonsville and Summit Park Historic District	December 27, 2006 (#06001186)	Between Frederick Rd., S. Rolling Rd., and Mellor Ave. 39°16′00″N 76°44′15″W	Catonsville	
14	Choate House	Choate House	July 20, 1989 (#89000807)	9600 Liberty; 39°22′35″N 76°48′52″W	Randallstown	
15	The Cloisters	The Cloisters	August 7, 1979 (#79001115)	West of Lutherville at 10440 Falls Rd. 39°24′39″N 76°40′17″W	Lutherville	
16	Corbett Historic District	Corbett Historic District	September 12, 1985 (#85002245)	1615-1827 Corbett Rd. and 16200-16225 Corbett Village Ln. 39°34′09″N 76°37′03″W	Monkton	
17	Craighill Channel Lower Range Front Light Station	Craighill Channel Lower Range Front Light Station	December 2, 2002 (#02001420)	3.5 miles southeast of Fort Howard; 39°11′19″N 76°23′39″W	Fort Howard	
18	Craighill Channel Lower Range Rear Light Station	Craighill Channel Lower Range Rear Light Station	December 2, 2002 (#02001418)	Edgemere area 39°13′45″N 76°23′40″W	Edgemere	
19	Cut-off Channel Range Front Light Station	Cut-off Channel Range Front Light Station	December 2, 2002 (#02001415)	Southwest of Fort Howard; 39°11′49″N 76°26′55″W	Fort Howard	
20	Cut-off Channel Range Rear Light Station	Cut-off Channel Range Rear Light Station	December 2, 2002 (#02001423)	Sparrows Point; 39°12′58″N 76°27′47″W	Edgemore	
21	Day Village Historic District	Day Village Historic District	March 27, 2020 (#100005133)	511 Avondale Rd. 39°14′20″N 76°30′17″W	Dundalk	
22	Dumbarton Historic District	Dumbarton Historic District	December 30, 2009 (#09001172)	Roughly bounded by Park Heights Ave., Slade Ave., Seven Mile La., and Old Court Rd. 39°22′37″N 76°42′37″W	Pikesville	
23	Dundalk Historic District	Dundalk Historic District	December 8, 1983 (#83003630)	Roughly bounded by Liberty Parkway, Dunman, Willow Spring and Sunship Rds., and Chesapeake and Patapsco Aves. 39°15′35″N 76°31′26″W	Dundalk	
24	Dundalk-Liberty-Cornwall Gardens	Dundalk-Liberty-Cornwall Gardens	September 23, 2011 (#11000700)	7003 Dunmanway; 39°15′27″N 76°31′06″W	Dundalk	
25	Eagle's Nest	Eagle's Nest	July 25, 1974 (#74000942)	Jarrettsville Pike; 39°28′15″N 76°34′32″W	Phoenix	
26	Ellicott's Mills Historic District	Ellicott's Mills Historic District	November 19, 1976 (#76000980)	Both sides of Maryland Route 144, south of the Patapsco River Bridge; 39°16′05″N 76°47′32″W	Oella	
27	Fort Carroll	Fort Carroll	April 14, 2015 (#14000955)	Soller's Flats, in the Patapsco River; 39°12′53″N 76°31′09″W	Curtis Bay	
28	Fort Garrison	Fort Garrison	January 25, 1971 (#71000368)	South of Stevenson at Garrison Farms Ct. 39°23′55″N 76°42′29″W	Stevenson	
29	Glencoe	Glencoe	May 9, 1983 (#83002942)	1314 Glencoe Rd. 39°33′04″N 76°38′06″W	Glencoe	
30	Glyndon Historic District	Glyndon Historic District	September 20, 1973 (#73000902)	Town of Glyndon and its environs along Maryland Route 128; 39°28′30″N 76°48′38″W	Glyndon	
31	Goucher College	Goucher College	August 28, 2007 (#07000885)	1021 Dulaney Valley Rd. 39°24′39″N 76°36′01″W	Towson	
32	Granite Historic District	Granite Historic District	September 22, 1994 (#94001091)	Roughly the area surrounding Old Court Rd. and St. Paul Ave. 39°20′36″N 76°50′51″W	Granite	
33	Green Spring Valley Historic District	Green Spring Valley Historic District	October 3, 1980 (#80001797)	Maryland Routes 25 and 140; 39°24′55″N 76°42′46″W	Lutherville and Owings Mills	
34	Grey Rock Mansion		July 10, 2023 (#100009110)	400 Grey Rock Road (also known as 400 Clifton Court); 39°23′38″N 76°44′16″W	Pikesville	
35	Halethorpe Colored School		January 2, 2026 (#100012468)	1900 Northeast Avenue; 39°14′21″N 76°40′50″W	Halethorpe	
36	Half-Way House	Half-Way House	September 8, 1980 (#89000809)	1.3 miles south of Parkton at 18200 York Rd.; also York Rd. and Weisburg Rd; 39°37′24″N 76°39′31″W	Parkton	Second address represents a boundary increase, added on July 12, 1989
37	Hampton National Historic Site	Hampton National Historic Site	October 15, 1966 (#66000389)	535 Hampton Lane; 39°25′02″N 76°35′17″W	Towson	
38	Hill House	Hill House	March 6, 1986 (#86000415)	19301 York Rd. 39°39′12″N 76°39′10″W	Parkton	
39	Hilton	Hilton	October 31, 1980 (#80001794)	800 S. Rolling Rd. 39°15′09″N 76°44′01″W	Catonsville	
40	Hull Memorial Christian Church	Hull Memorial Christian Church	September 15, 1977 (#77000684)	101 Clyde Ave. 39°14′41″N 76°39′48″W	Lansdowne	
41	Jericho Covered Bridge	Jericho Covered Bridge	September 13, 1978 (#78001444)	East of Kingsville on Franklinville Rd. 39°27′34″N 76°23′16″W	Kingsville	
42	Jericho Farm	Jericho Farm	September 7, 1984 (#84001352)	12230 Jericho Rd. 39°27′23″N 76°23′17″W	Kingsville	
43	James Lawrence Kernan Hospital	James Lawrence Kernan Hospital	September 24, 1979 (#79003275)	Windsor Mill Rd. and Forest Park Ave. 39°18′48″N 76°42′34″W	Wetheredsville	
44	Lime Kiln Bottom	Lime Kiln Bottom	April 17, 2019 (#100003655)	2177 Cromwell Bridge Rd. 39°25′02″N 76°32′32″W	Parkville	
45	Long Green Valley Historic District	Long Green Valley Historic District	December 30, 1982 (#82001589)	Glen Arm, Baldwin Mill, Manor, and Hartford Rds. areas 39°28′35″N 76°29′23″W	Baldwin, Glen Arm, Hydes	
46	Long Island Farm	Long Island Farm	August 30, 2010 (#10000586)	220 Cromwell Bridge Rd. 39°25′05″N 76°32′33″W	Parkville	
47	Lorraine Park Cemetery Gate Lodge	Lorraine Park Cemetery Gate Lodge	July 25, 1985 (#85001613)	5608 Dogwood Rd. 39°18′47″N 76°43′05″W	Woodlawn	
48	Lutherville Historic District	Lutherville Historic District	November 9, 1972 (#72000568)	Roughly bounded by Interstate 695, York and Ridgely Rds., and Lutherville Dr. 39°25′19″N 76°38′41″W	Lutherville	
49	Glenn L. Martin Company Plant No. 2		August 14, 2023 (#100009218)	2800 Eastern Blvd. 39°20′11″N 76°24′59″W	Middle River	
50	The Meadows	The Meadows	March 23, 1988 (#88000203)	302 Meadows Ln. 39°24′05″N 76°47′52″W	Owings Mills	
51	Mettam Memorial Baptist Church	Mettam Memorial Baptist Church	April 24, 1975 (#75000867)	Old Court Rd. between Sudbrook and Reisterstown Rds. 39°22′41″N 76°43′10″W	Pikesville	
52	Montrose Mansion and Chapel		March 19, 1990 (#90000354)	13700 Hanover Rd. 39°29′52″N 76°51′09″W	Reisterstown	
53	Mount de Sales Academy	Mount de Sales Academy	May 30, 1986 (#86001187)	700 Academy Rd. 39°17′06″N 76°43′17″W	Catonsville	
54	Mt. Gilboa Chapel	Mt. Gilboa Chapel	October 21, 1976 (#76000978)	Oella and Westchester Aves. 39°16′27″N 76°46′45″W	Oella	
55	My Lady's Manor	My Lady's Manor	April 15, 1978 (#78001445)	Maryland Route 138; 39°35′15″N 76°34′16″W	Monkton	
56	Oella Historic District	Oella Historic District	November 7, 1976 (#76000979)	Oella Ave., Glen Rd., Hollow Rd. 39°16′49″N 76°47′09″W	Oella	
57	Old Catonsville High School	Old Catonsville High School	September 10, 1987 (#87001568)	20 Winters Ln. 39°16′22″N 76°44′10″W	Catonsville	
58	Old National Pike Milestones	Old National Pike Milestones	November 27, 1975 (#75002107)	U.S. Route 40, U.S. Route 40 Alternate, and U.S. Route 40 Scenic, and Maryland Routes 144 and 165; 39°16′23″N 76°43′37″W	Catonsville	
59	Old Salem Church and Cemetery	Old Salem Church and Cemetery	December 13, 1977 (#77000683)	Ingleside Ave. and Calverton St. 39°17′05″N 76°43′53″W	Catonsville	
60	Owings Upper Mill	Owings Upper Mill	September 13, 1978 (#78001446)	Reisterstown Rd. and Groff Ln. 39°25′19″N 76°46′59″W	Owings Mills	
61	Parkton Hotel	Parkton Hotel	December 8, 1983 (#83003634)	18848 York Rd. (MD 45); 39°38′30″N 76°39′34″W	Parkton	
62	Patterson Viaduct Ruins	Patterson Viaduct Ruins	June 3, 1976 (#76002221)	South of Catonsville at the Patapsco River; 39°15′00″N 76°45′51″W	Catonsville	
63	Perry Hall	Perry Hall	April 23, 1980 (#80001796)	North of Perry Hall on Perry Hall Rd. 39°25′43″N 76°27′33″W	Perry Hall	
64	Pikesville Armory	Pikesville Armory	September 25, 1985 (#85002674)	610 Reisterstown Rd. 39°22′08″N 76°43′18″W	Pikesville	
65	Plinlimmon Farm	Plinlimmon Farm	May 19, 1983 (#83002943)	9401 Lyons Mill Rd. 39°23′35″N 76°47′59″W	Owings Mills	
66	Prospect Hill	Prospect Hill	July 26, 1973 (#73000903)	Northeast of Long Green on Kane's Rd. 39°28′48″N 76°30′47″W	Long Green	
67	Ravenshurst		August 14, 1978 (#78001443)	12915 Dulaney Valley Rd. 39°28′48″N 76°31′50″W	Glen Arm	
68	Reisterstown Historic District	Reisterstown Historic District	November 15, 1979 (#79001118)	Maryland Routes 30 and 140; 39°27′49″N 76°49′32″W	Reisterstown	
69	Rockland	Rockland	February 2, 1983 (#83002944)	10214 Falls Rd. 39°24′11″N 76°40′15″W	Brooklandville	
70	Rockland Historic District	Rockland Historic District	April 11, 1973 (#73000899)	Both sides of Falls Rd. (Maryland Route 25) at its junction with Old Court Rd. (Maryland Route 133); 39°24′03″N 76°40′06″W	Brooklandville	
71	Rodgers Forge Historic District	Rodgers Forge Historic District	September 24, 2009 (#09000783)	Roughly bounded by Stanmore Rd., Stevenson La., York Rd., Regester Ave., and Bellona Ave. 39°22′52″N 76°37′02″W	Towson	
72	Sheppard and Enoch Pratt Hospital and Gatehouse	Sheppard and Enoch Pratt Hospital and Gatehouse	November 11, 1971 (#71000369)	Charles St. 39°23′28″N 76°37′09″W	Towson	
73	St. Charles College Historic District	St. Charles College Historic District	September 30, 1983 (#83002945)	711 Maiden Choice Lane; 39°16′07″N 76°42′46″W	Catonsville	
74	St. James Church	St. James Church	September 12, 1974 (#74000941)	Southeast of Monkton off Manor Rd. 39°33′41″N 76°34′11″W	Monkton	
75	St. John's Church	St. John's Church	March 15, 1982 (#82002807)	7538 Bellona Ave. 39°23′41″N 76°38′39″W	Ruxton	
76	St. John's Church, Western Run Parish		January 8, 2026 (#100012334)	3738 Butler Road; 39°30′09″N 76°46′49″W	Reisterstown	
77	St. Mary's Episcopal Church	St. Mary's Episcopal Church	March 14, 1985 (#85000583)	5610 Dogwood Rd. 39°18′47″N 76°43′16″W	Woodlawn	
78	St. Michael's Church	St. Michael's Church	October 22, 1979 (#79003273)	Academy Lane and Reisterstown Rd. 39°27′04″N 76°49′08″W	Reisterstown	
79	St. Thomas Church	St. Thomas Church	May 24, 1979 (#79001117)	St. Thomas Lane and Garrison Forest Rd. 39°25′19″N 76°45′43″W	Owings Mills	
80	Sila Residence		September 12, 2025 (#100012217)	1801 Indian Head Road; 39°23′26″N 76°39′29″W	Towson	
81	Stone Hall	Stone Hall	July 26, 1973 (#73000900)	North of Cockeysville off Maryland Route 25 on Cuba Rd. 39°30′34″N 76°41′58″W	Cockeysville	
82	Stoneleigh Historic District	Stoneleigh Historic District	November 8, 2003 (#03001113)	Roughly bounded by Regester Ave., York Rd., Hatherleigh Rd., and Kenleigh Rd. 39°22′46″N 76°36′16″W	Towson	
83	Sudbrook Park	Sudbrook Park	June 19, 1973 (#73000904)	South of Pikesville off U.S. Route 40 on Greenwood Rd. 39°21′58″N 76°43′49″W	Pikesville	
84	Summit	Summit	July 24, 1979 (#79001114)	10 Stanley Dr. 39°16′06″N 76°44′35″W	Catonsville	
85	The Wilderness	The Wilderness	September 12, 1985 (#85002173)	2 Thistle Rd. 39°15′27″N 76°46′03″W	Catonsville	
86	Thomas Viaduct, Baltimore & Ohio Railroad	Thomas Viaduct, Baltimore & Ohio Railroad	October 15, 1966 (#66000388)	Over the Patapsco River between Relay and Elkridge; 39°13′19″N 76°42′49″W	Relay	
87	Todd Farmhouse	Todd Farmhouse	October 18, 1973 (#73000901)	9000 Old North Point Rd. (Maryland Route 20); 39°12′49″N 76°26′18″W	Fort Howard	
88	Towson Academy	Towson Academy	September 25, 1985 (#85002675)	Washington St. and Chesapeake Ave. 39°23′57″N 76°36′20″W	Towson	
89	Tyrconnell	Tyrconnell	March 14, 1985 (#85000582)	120 Woodbrook Lane; 39°22′50″N 76°38′08″W	Towson	
90	Villa Anneslie	Villa Anneslie	December 13, 1977 (#77000685)	529 Dunkirk Rd. 39°22′34″N 76°36′20″W	Towson	
91	Wester Ogle	Wester Ogle	January 11, 1985 (#85000058)	8948-8950 Reisterstown Rd. 39°23′31″N 76°45′01″W	Pikesville	
92	Western Run-Belfast Road Historic District	Western Run-Belfast Road Historic District	January 23, 1979 (#79001116)	Northwest of Lutherville; 39°31′45″N 76°41′39″W	Lutherville	
93	Winters Lane Historic District	Winters Lane Historic District	December 21, 2007 (#07001285)	Winters Ln. between Frederick Rd. and Baltimore National Pike. 39°16′45″N 76°44′31″W	Catonsville	
94	Worthington Valley Historic District	Worthington Valley Historic District	December 12, 1976 (#76000977)	Bounded by Falls and Shawan Rds., Tufton and Worthington Aves., and the Baltimore Gas and Electric Right-of-Way; 39°29′59″N 76°45′19″W	Glyndon	

== Former listing ==
	Name on the Register	Image	Date listed	Date removed	Location	City or town	Description
1	Belle Field		October 29, 1975 (#75000868)	May 12, 1986	Timonium Rd.	Timonium	

== See also ==
- National Register of Historic Places listings in Baltimore, Maryland
- List of National Historic Landmarks in Maryland
- National Register of Historic Places listings in Maryland
