= Ravenhurst =

Ravenhurst may refer to:

- Ravenshurst, or Ravenhurst – a historic home in Maryland, USA
- Omar Khayyam Ravenhurst – pen-name of Discordianism co-founder Kerry Wendell Thornley (1938–1998)
- Lord Ravenhurst – a character in the 1955 film The Court Jester
- Ravenhurst – a fictional British mansion in the 1978 horror film The Legacy

== See also ==
- Outlaws of Ravenhurst – a Canadian rock band
