= Anneslie Historic District =

Historic district in Maryland, United States

- U.S. National Register of Historic Places
- U.S. Historic district
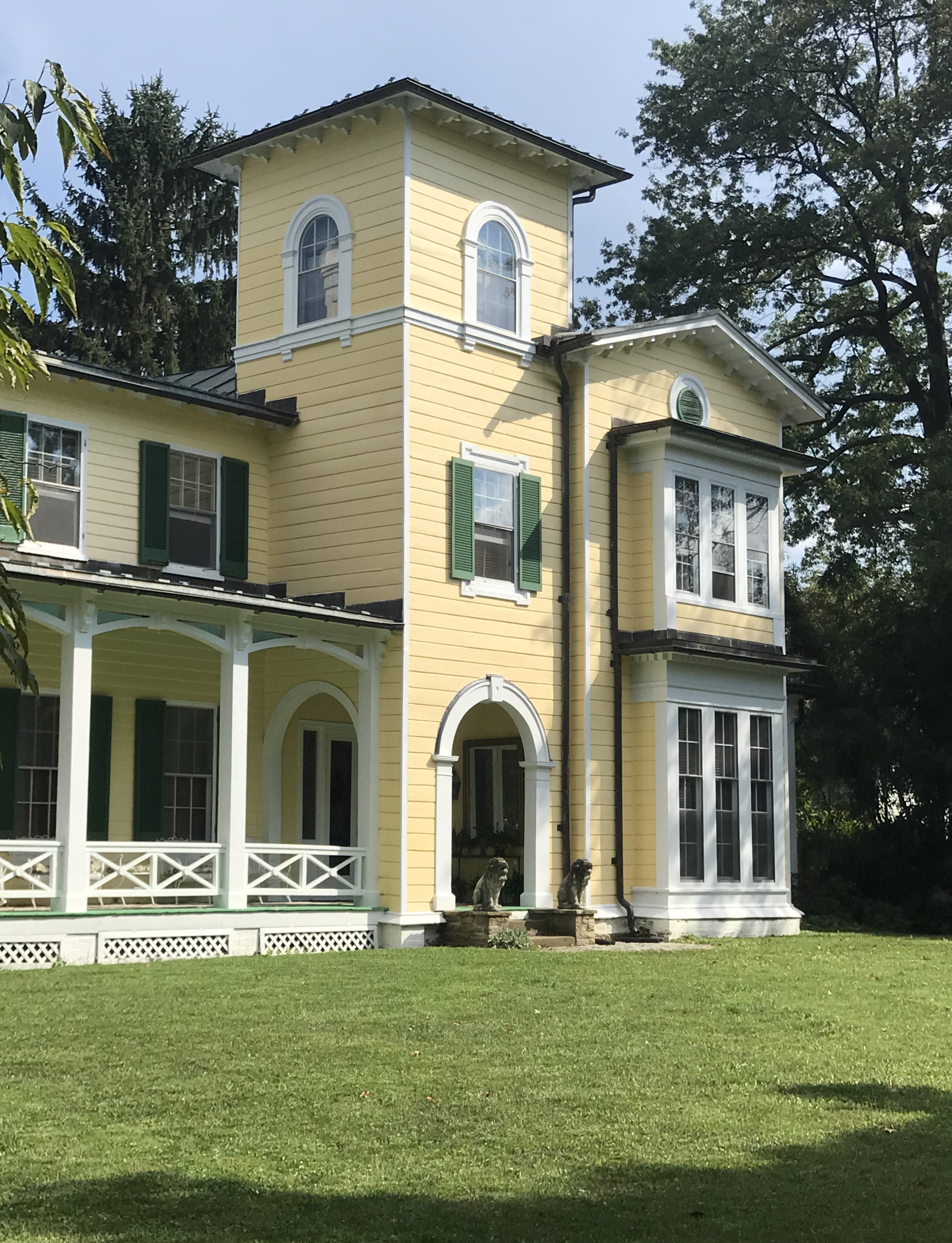
- Villa Anneslie

- Location within Maryland Location within the United States
- Location: Roughly bounded by York, Maplewood, & Windwood Rds., & Regester Ave., Towson, Maryland
- Coordinates: 39°22′33″N 76°36′16″W
- Area: 119 acres (48 ha)
- Architectural style: Tudor Revival; Colonial Revival; Cape Cod; Foursquare; Bungalow
- NRHP reference No.: 12000097
- Added to NRHP: March 12, 2012

The Anneslie Historic District (/ˈænɪsliː/) encompasses a residential area just north of the city line of Baltimore, Maryland in Towson. It is a grid of five streets extending eastward from York Avenue and south from Regester Avenue. The area was platted out in 1922 and mostly built out by the 1950s. Properties in the northern section of the district, on Regester Avenue, Murdock, Anneslie, and Dunkirk Roads, were built in the 1920s and 1930s, in Bungalow, Foursquare, and cottage styles, while the streets further south were built out primarily with Cape, Tudor, and Colonial style houses. The district takes its name from Anneslie estate, whose house still stands in the district.

The district was added to the National Register of Historic Places in 2012.

== See also ==
- National Register of Historic Places listings in Baltimore County, Maryland
