= Bare Hills House =

Historic house in Maryland

- U.S. National Register of Historic Places
- U.S. Historic district – Contributing property
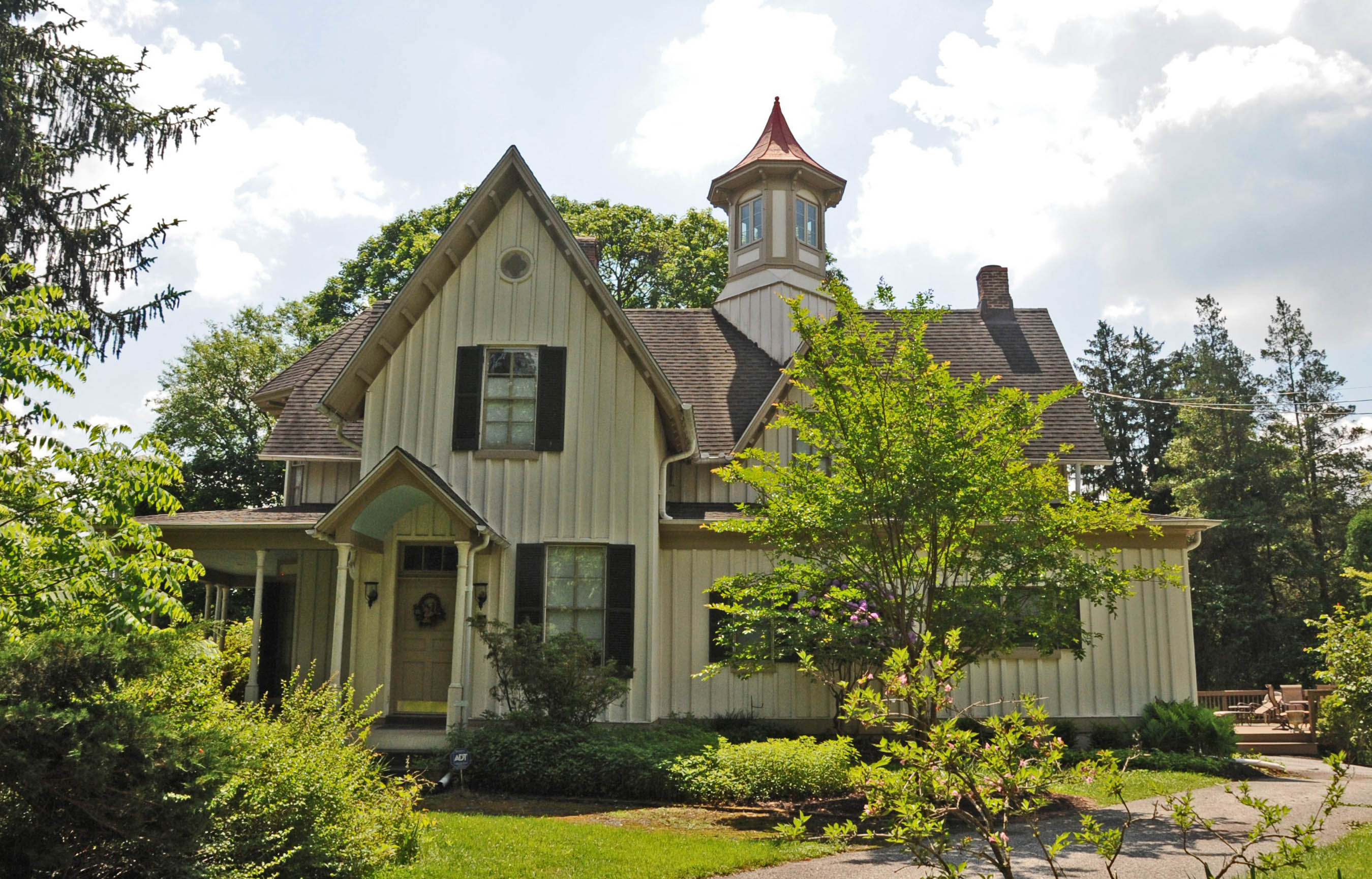
- Bare Hills House, 2016

- Location within Maryland Location within the United States
- Location: North of Baltimore at 6222 Falls Rd., Towson, Maryland
- Coordinates: 39°22′54″N 76°39′21″W
- Area: 2.1 acres (0.85 ha)
- Built: 1856
- Architectural style: Stick/Eastlake, Gothic Revival
- Part of: Bare Hills Historic District (ID11000852)
- NRHP reference No.: 80001793

Significant dates
- Added to NRHP: August 6, 1980
- Designated CP: November 22, 2011

The Bare Hills House is a historic home built about 1856 in the Mount Washington area of Baltimore County, Maryland, United States. It is a two-story frame dwelling with steep gables and board-and batten siding. The house is an example of the Carpenter Gothic style of architecture.

It was listed on the National Register of Historic Places on August 6, 1980. It is located at 6222 Falls Road in the Bare Hills Historic District.

== See also ==
- National Register of Historic Places listings in Baltimore County, Maryland
