= Dundalk-Liberty-Cornwall Gardens =

- U.S. National Register of Historic Places
- Location within Maryland Location within the United States
- Location: 7003 Dunmanway, Dundalk, Maryland
- Coordinates: 39°15′27″N 76°31′06″W
- Area: 26 acres (11 ha)
- Built: 1937-1942
- Architect: Iser, Gustave W.
- Architectural style: Colonial Revival
- NRHP reference No.: 11000700
- Added to NRHP: September 23, 2011

The Dundalk, Liberty, and Cornwall Gardens are a trio of historic apartment complexes on Dunmanway in Dundalk, Maryland, United States. They consist of a total of 30 two-story brick Colonial Revival style buildings, which were built between 1937 and 1942, and contain garden-style apartments. Construction of the buildings was funded in part by grants from the Federal Housing Authority, whose principles guided the layout of the buildings to maximize natural light, and allow for the creation of car-free landscaped courtyards. As a result, the complexes also include separate garage buildings where residents could leave their cars. Each complex has features that distinguish it from the others.

The buildings were listed on the National Register of Historic Places in 2011.

== See also ==
- National Register of Historic Places listings in Baltimore County, Maryland
