= Long Island Farm =

Historic house in Maryland, United States

- U.S. National Register of Historic Places
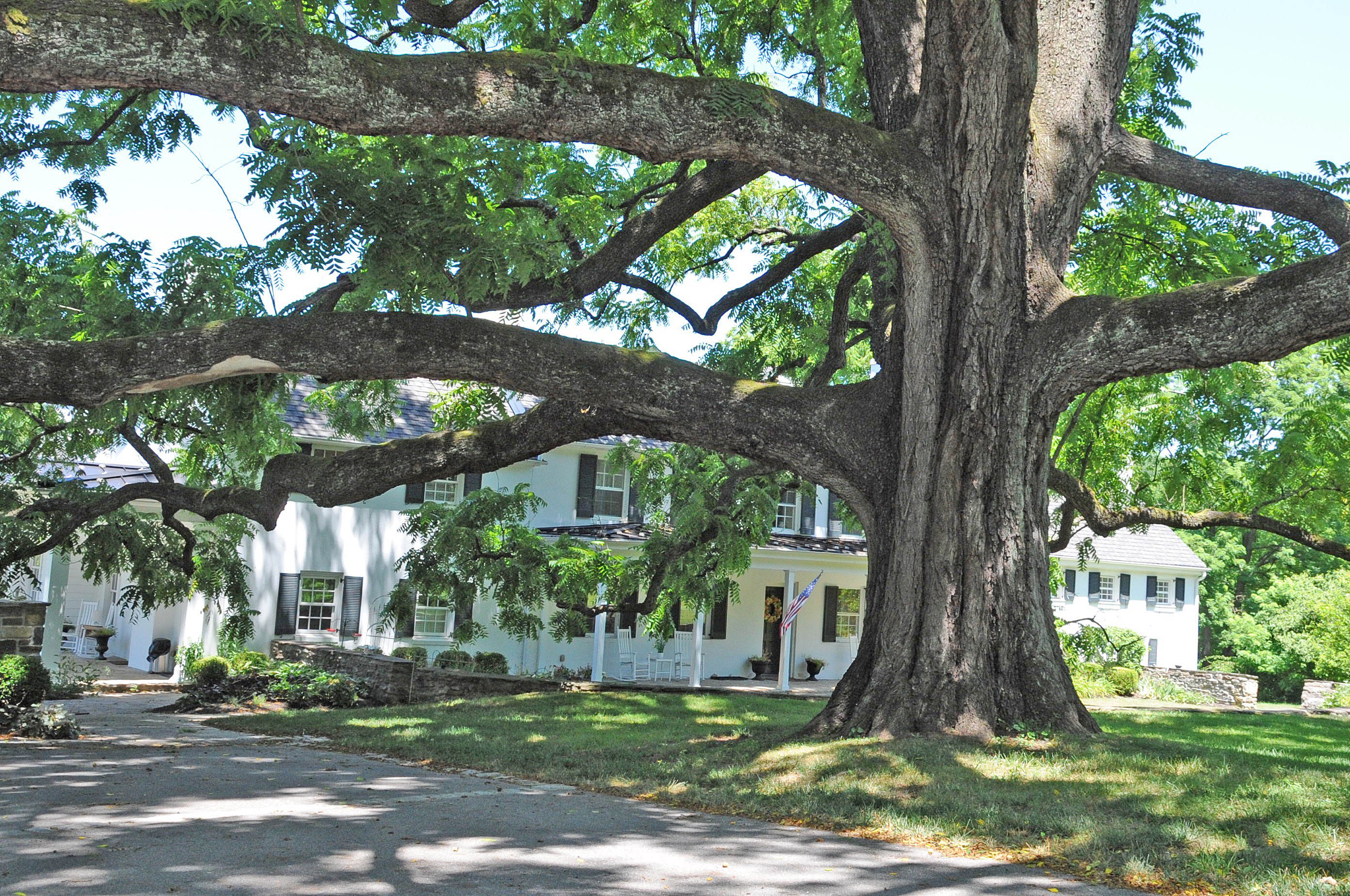

- Location within Maryland Location within the United States
- Location: 2200 Cromwell Bridge Road, Parkville, Maryland, U.S.
- Coordinates: 39°25′5″N 76°32′33″W
- Area: 6.8 acres (2.8 ha)
- Built: before 1770 (1764 by oral tradition)
- NRHP reference No.: 10000586
- Added to NRHP: August 30, 2010

Long Island Farm is a historic farmstead at 2200 Cromwell Bridge Road in Parkville, Maryland. The main house is a rambling multi-part building whose oldest part is said to date to 1764, when Isaac Risteau purchased the property. The main eastern block of the house is built of stone and is five bays wide, but shows evidence that it once consisted of several separate sections that were built separately and then combined. The western block is a modern 20th century addition. The farmstead was associated with the Risteau and Jenifer families for over two centuries.

Long Island Farm was listed on the National Register of Historic Places in 2010.

== See also ==
- National Register of Historic Places listings in Baltimore County, Maryland
