= Cromwell Valley Park =

Park in Maryland, United States of America

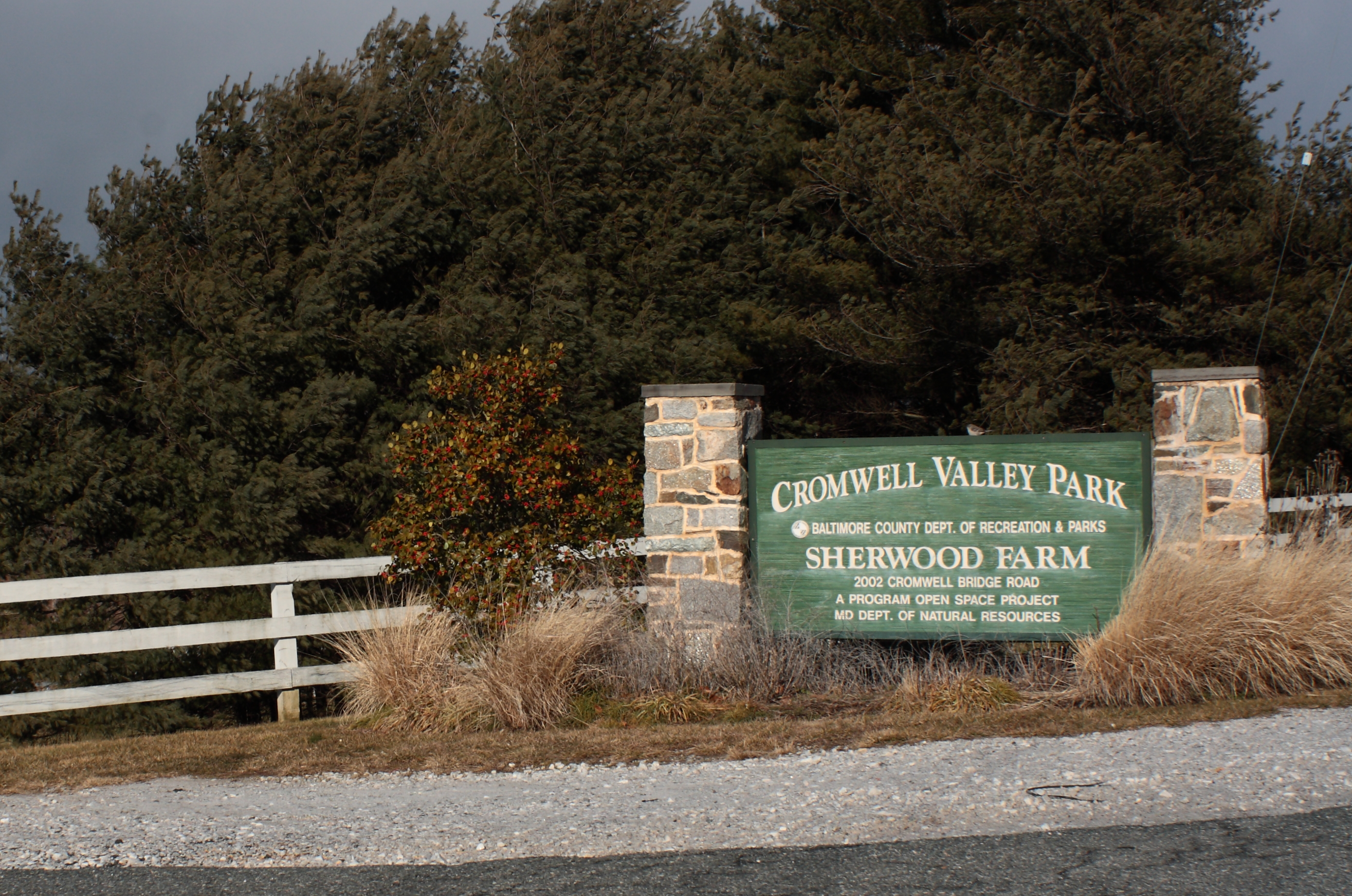
- Interactive map of Cromwell Valley Park
- Type: Rural park
- Location: Baltimore County, Maryland, United States
- Coordinates: 39°25′N 76°33′W
- Area: 426 acres (172 ha) (1.7 km²)
- Created: 1993
- Operator: Baltimore County Dept. of Recreation & Parks
- Status: Open all year

Cromwell Valley Park is a public park just to the north of Baltimore City. The park initially opened in 1993, on 426 acres (172 ha) of rural farm land. It is primarily open fields, woods, cultivated gardens and orchards. The varied terrain provides an excellent habitat for local wildlife, particularly birds of prey which feed on large populations of mice, rabbits and other small mammals. Healthy populations of white-tailed deer, red fox and local songbirds can also be found throughout the park. Several miles of trails traverse the park making it popular among local hikers, birdwatchers and photographers.

== History ==
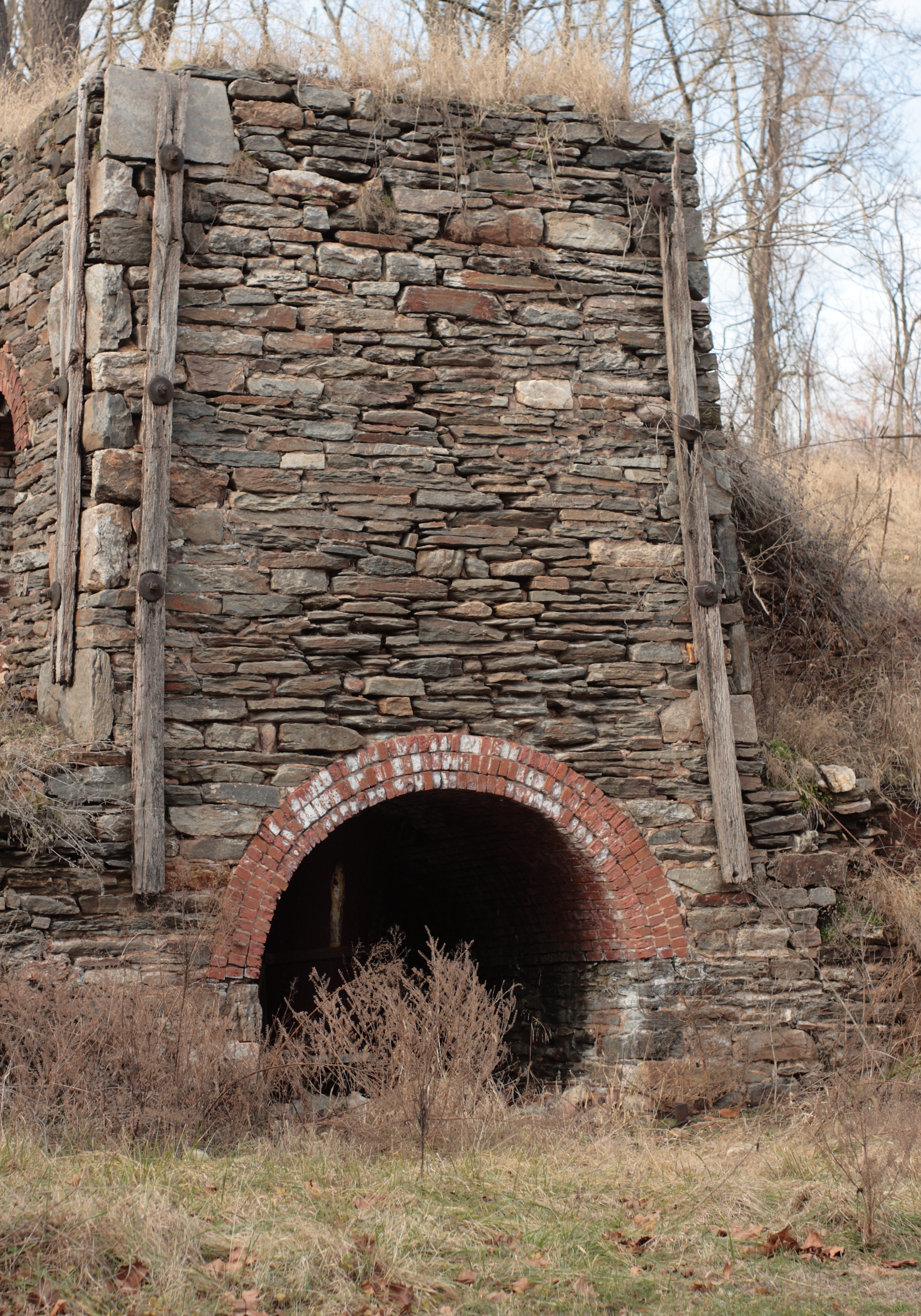
a remaining lime kiln

The first Europeans settled the valley in the beginning of the eighteenth century. The Ravens were one of the first families to settle Cromwell Valley, along with the Stansburys, Towsons and Risteaus. William Cromwell married into the Ravens family and became the valley's namesake in 1773. In the end of the eighteenth century the use of lime to replenish farm land became common. The valley became a regional production center for agricultural lime as marble was readily available at nearby Cockeysville quarries. This marble was converted to useful lime in an array of wood powered lime kilns. The remnants of several of these kilns can still be found throughout the park. The Lime Kiln Bottom was listed on the National Register of Historic Places in 2019.

The park's current land was acquired from three property owners over the course of two years beginning in March 1993. The eastern district of the park, Willow Grove Farm, was purchased from the descendants of Robert Merrick, a wealthy local banker. The central section, Sherwood Farm, was purchased from the Sherwood family. The Sherwoods had lived off the farm for several generations, selling fruit and various livestock products. The third and most westward portion of the current park land, Fellowship Farm, was previously a Christmas tree farm owned by Franklin Eck. The majority of the land was purchased using funds from Maryland's "Program Open Space" project.

== Willow Grove Nature Education Center ==
The Willow Grove Nature Education Center, located in the renovated Willow Grove Farm house, offers programs about nature, farming, local history and conservation awareness. Exhibits include live amphibians reptiles and hands-on natural history displays. It is operated by the Baltimore County Department of Recreation and Parks.

== Children's Garden ==
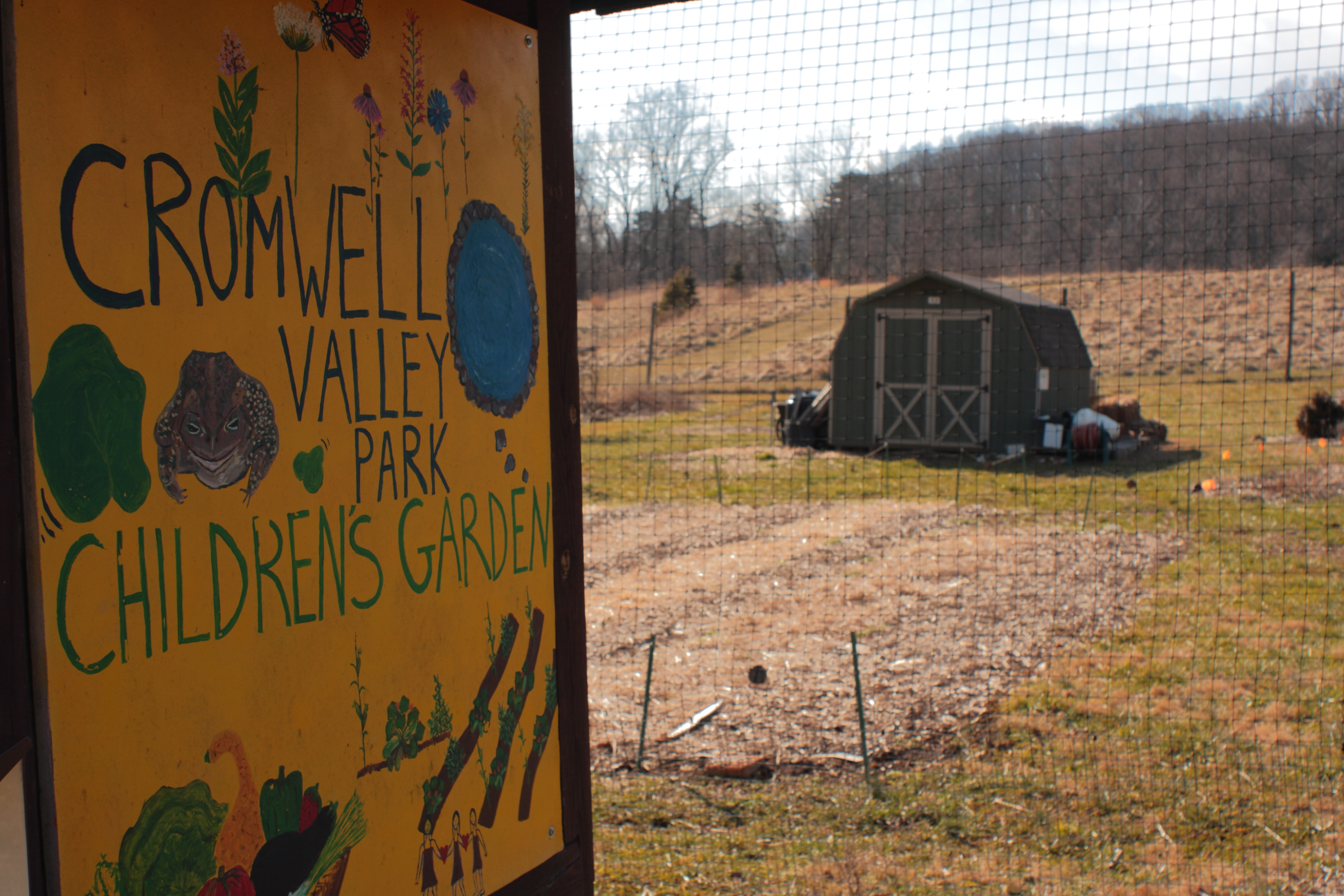

The half-acre Children's Garden is one of the centerpieces of the park. School groups come in the spring and fall to plant and harvest a variety of fruits and vegetables in the garden. During the summer children come from local summer camps to observe the frogs, butterflies and birds that are attracted by the native plants and small pond. It is located next the Education Center.

In August 2022, Owen Fay, scout from Troop 729, completed his Eagle Project in the garden, constructing a roof extension on the existing shed.

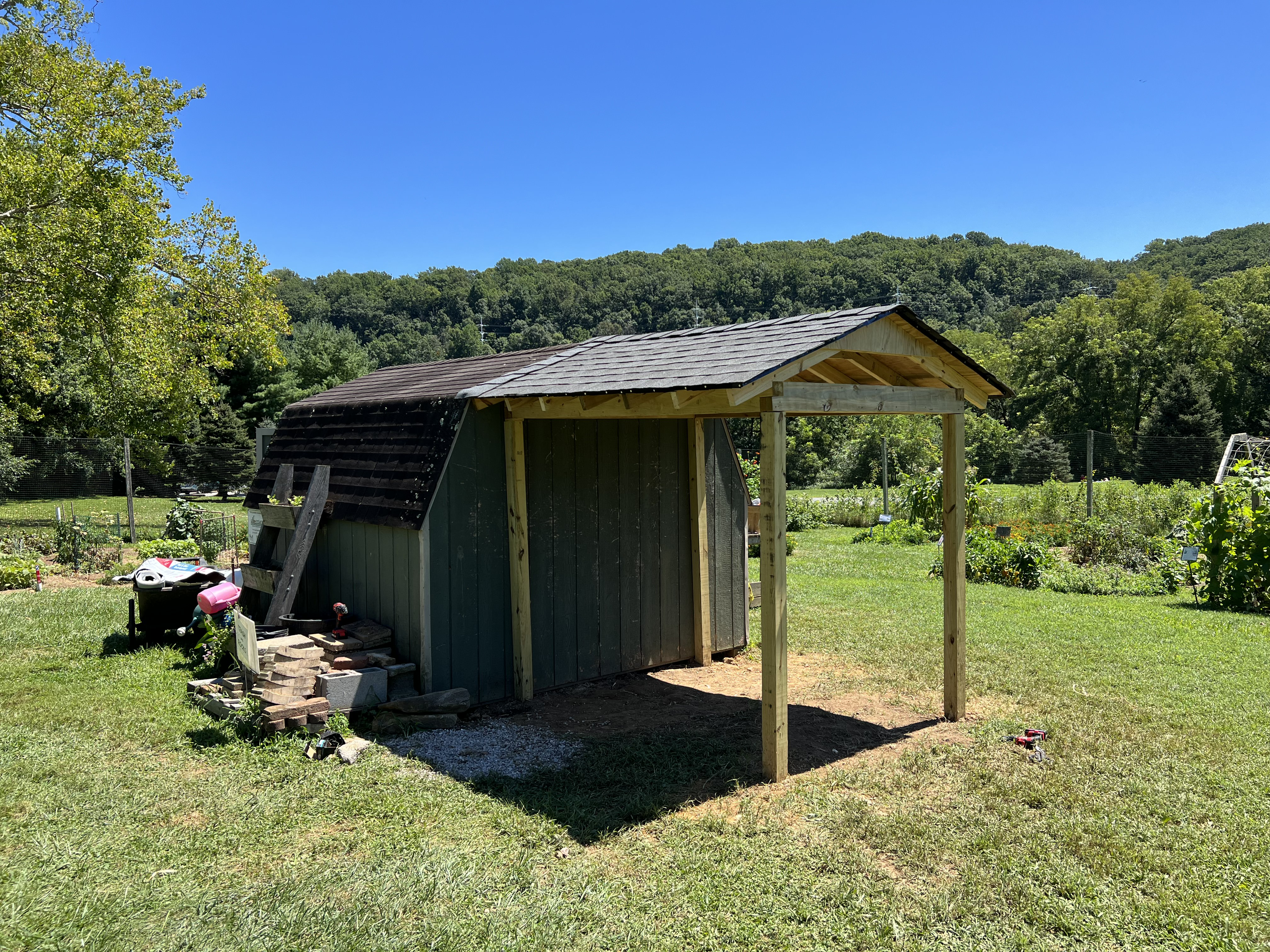
The shed roof extension constructed by Owen Fay for his Eagle Scout project
