= C.C. Lang & Son =

Baltimore, Maryland-based pickle manufacturing company

C. C. Lang & Son was a Baltimore-based pickle and sauerkraut manufacturing company that was founded in 1881. Located in one of the chief canning cities of the United States, the pickle and sauerkraut company supplied their own cucumbers and cabbage from the Lang Farm, located in Glen Arm, Maryland.

Started by German immigrant C.C. Lang, the business was passed down to Charles Gottlieb Lang, (1890–1956) who expanded the small business into an enterprise employing 700 persons in Maryland, Virginia, South Carolina, North Carolina, New York, Wisconsin, and Michigan.

In the 1940s this pickle and sauerkraut industry was made up of about 300 canning factories located around the country. In addition to C.C. Lang & Son, these companies include the H. J. Heinz Company and Hunt Foods, as well as California Packing Corp, Green Bay Food Company and Libby, McNeill & Libby.
