= Bare Hills Historic District =

Historic district in Maryland, United States

- U.S. National Register of Historic Places
- U.S. Historic district
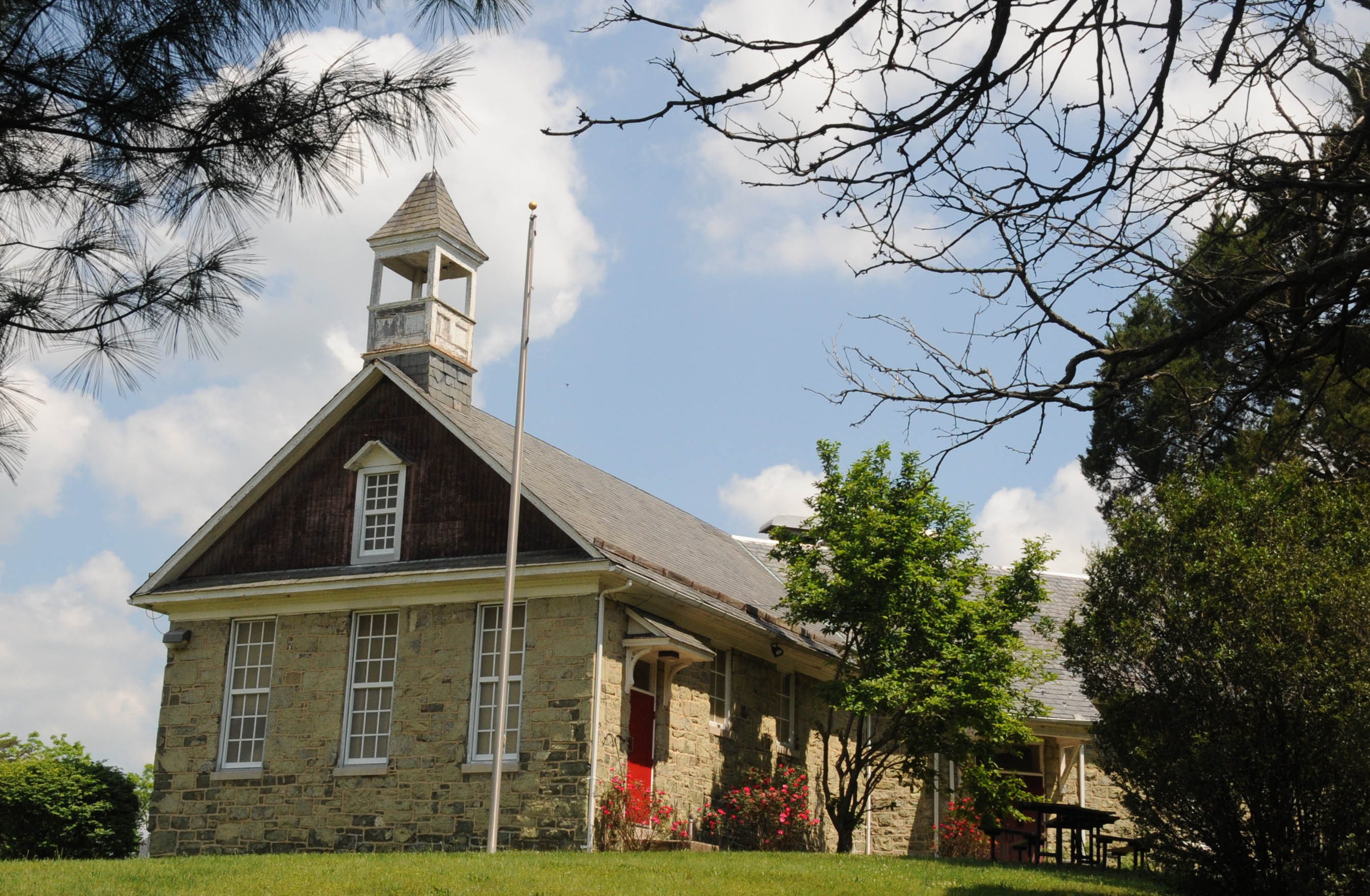
- Bare Hills School

- Location within Maryland Location within the United States
- Location: Falls Rd. between Light Rail and north of Coppermine Terrace, Towson, Maryland
- Coordinates: 39°23′14″N 76°39′34″W
- Area: 275 acres (111 ha)
- Architectural style: Gothic Revival; Mid-Century Modern
- NRHP reference No.: 11000852
- Added to NRHP: November 22, 2011

The Bare Hills Historic District encompasses a residential area north of Baltimore, Maryland, in Baltimore County, which had industrial beginnings before being transformed into a suburb of the city. The district includes Lake Roland Park (formerly named Robert E. Lee Park,) as well as a cluster of largely vernacular dwellings between the park and Falls Turnpike that was built mainly in the 19th century.

== Overview ==
The Maryland Historical Trust (MHT) describes the district as follows:

The Bare Hills Historic District, covering approximately 275 acres, takes its name from the geological formation it in part encompasses, a promontory of Serpentine (“copper rock”) around which the Jones Falls flows on its way to Baltimore and the Chesapeake Bay.

The Bare Hills Historic District represents a community's development from its industrial beginnings in milling and mining into a transportation corridor along the Falls Turnpike, and finally to a residential area after rail services enabled commuting into Baltimore. The district includes 90 properties which provide:

- The 19th-20th century African American Scott Settlement—one of the earliest free-black communities in Baltimore County.
- Late 19th and 20th century residential development along the railroad and Lake Roland.
- Lake Roland Park (so-named since 28 September 2015). Originally named Robert E. Lee Park, the portion included in the historic district encompasses a wooded landscape on the side of the undeveloped 1898 Sorrento subdivision

The MHT description also states:

Visually, the Bare Hills Historic District is characterized by the integration of various sizes, types and styles of construction spanning almost a century and a half of development. Within the wooded environment, most of the houses are of frame construction, many of them gable fronted, with wood-shingled walls, porches, and with foundations constructed of the local Serpentine stone. The majority of houses and their support buildings date from 1890 to 1920, but there are significant examples both earlier and later, such as the individually National Register-listed Gothic Revival Bare Hills House built in 1857, the 1881 serpentine stone Bare Hills School, and the Mid-Century Modern Hooper House II, designed by Marcel Breuer and constructed in 1959-60.

== Geology ==
Situated on a serpentine barrens, its thin and unfertile serpentine soil defined the Bare Hills area. H. H. Hayden documented the discovery of the area's mineral value:

Until the year 1808 or 1810, little was known of the mineralogical character of these hills, and little else was obvious to the traveler besides their repulsive aspect. About this time, the chromate of iron, in small irregular or rolled masses, was discovered in one of the deep ravines, by Mr. Henfrey, a gentleman who it is believed, was the discoverer of chrome, titanium, and several other interesting minerals, in this part of the country. Subsequently, and particularly since the commencement of regular operations for obtaining chromate of iron, this district has excited, especially among mineralogists, a degree of interest not surpassed, perhaps, in the case of any locality in the United States.

The discovery occurred on Jesse Tyson's farm. Tyson's son Isaac Tyson Jr. successfully mined the Bare Hills for chromite and identified other serpentine barrens in Maryland as chromite sources, including the Soldiers Delight area in western Baltimore County. His acumen established Maryland as the world's leading producer of chromium until the middle of the 19th century. All extraction at Bare Hills ceased by 1833.

The Bare Hills rock formation forces Jones Falls into an approximately 2.5 mile half-circle detour to the East before it resumes its south-southeasterly flow.

== History ==
Bare Hills is also notable as the site of one of the earliest free African-American communities in Baltimore County, established about 1830 by Aquila Scott. Per the registration document for Bare Hills in the National Register of Historic Places:

Aquila (Aquilla) Scott, a blacksmith by trade as well as a Methodist preacher, arrived in the Bare Hills area by 1830. Descended from a St. Mary's County freed-slave named Tobias Scott, Aquila Scott was among a growing population of free blacks in Maryland. In 1833, Scott was named among the five trustees of a small congregation of the Bethel Episcopal Methodist Religious Society in a deed from Mary and Elijah Fishpaw. The deed was for land in the northeast corner of the Hopyard tract on which to build a church, later called St. John's Church. Though the church was located on the east side of the Jones Falls and the B&S (Baltimore and Susquehanna) Rail Road, Aquila Scott purchased two acres of land in 1839 from Johnzee Hook on the summit of the Bare Hills. The parcel fronted onto the Falls Turnpike and there Scott established his blacksmith shop and dwelling house. As Scott's family children grew and eventually started their own families, they built their houses on the two-acre tract and the community became known as "Scott's Settlement." Aquila Scott died in 1858, while preaching in the church he helped establish and was buried on his Bare Hills property.

Note. Scott's original log church burned in 1876. Its replacement, built in 1886, remains standing. The church site lies on the opposite side of Lake Roland, outside of this historic district.

The district was added to the National Register of Historic Places in 2011. It includes the previously listed Bare Hills House.

== See also ==
- National Register of Historic Places listings in Baltimore County, Maryland
