= Parkton Hotel =

- U.S. National Register of Historic Places
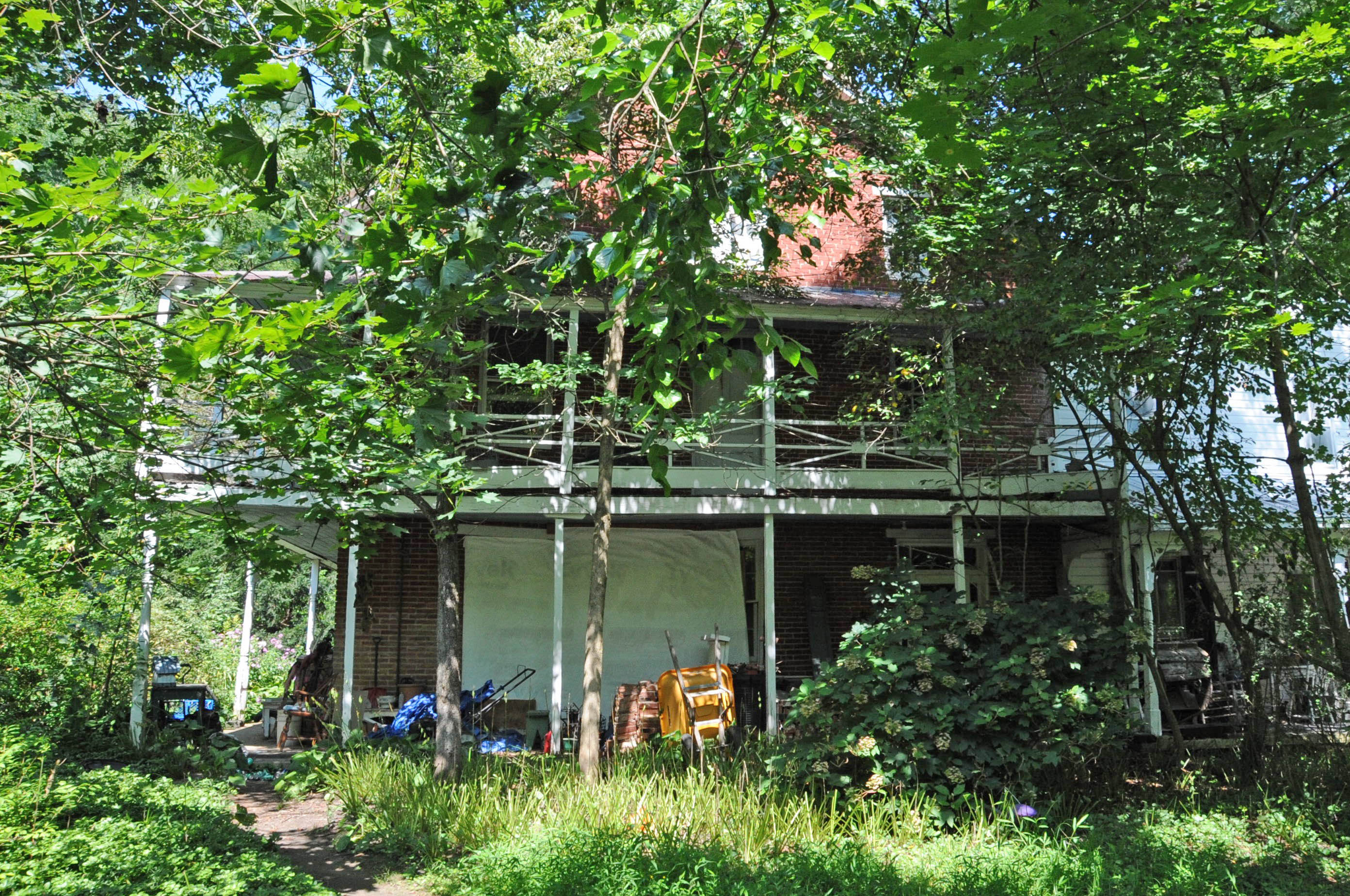
- The hotel was completely inundated with trees in 2024

- Location within Maryland Location within the United States
- Location: 18848 York Road (MD 45), Parkton, Maryland
- Coordinates: 39°38′30″N 76°39′34″W
- Area: less than one acre
- Built: 1850-1860
- NRHP reference No.: 83003634
- Added to NRHP: December 8, 1983

Parkton Hotel is a historic hotel located at Parkton, Baltimore County, Maryland, United States. It is a 3 1/2-story brick structure, five bays wide by three bays deep, constructed between 1850 and 1860. The hotel features a two-tiered, shed-roofed gallery which wraps around the south gable end. A two-story, two-bay, shed-roofed frame addition dating from 1884 extends to the rear of the brick block.

The Parkton Hotel was listed on the National Register of Historic Places in 1983.
