= Wetheredsville, Maryland =

Unincorporated community in Maryland

- Unincorporated community
- Location within the state of Maryland
- Coordinates: 39°18′55″N 76°42′12″W
- Country: United States of America
- State: Maryland
- Time zone: UTC-5 (Eastern (EST))
  - Summer (DST): UTC-4 (EDT)

Wetheredsville is an unincorporated community in Baltimore, Maryland, United States. James Lawrence Kernan Hospital was listed on the National Register of Historic Places in 1979.
