= Day Village Historic District =

- U.S. National Register of Historic Places
- U.S. Historic district
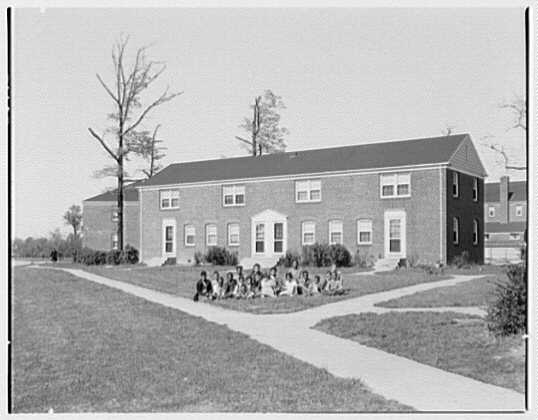
- Day Village in 1950

- Location within Maryland Location within the United States
- Location: 511 Avondale Rd., Dundalk, Maryland
- Coordinates: 39°14′20″N 76°30′17″W
- Built: 1944
- Built by: Joseph P. Day Construction Corporation (Builder)
- Architect: Gustave W. Iser (Architect)
- NRHP reference No.: 100005133
- Added to NRHP: March 27, 2020

Day Village Historic District, also known as Day Village Townhomes, is a historic district located at Dundalk, Baltimore County, Maryland. The district encompasses a garden apartment complex with 72 buildings, including 68 two-story masonry building blocks divided into individual townhouse units. Additional buildings on the site include a brick caretaker’s house (now a stand-alone rental unit), and the two commercial buildings. Opened in 1944, it was one of the first privately developed garden apartment communities for African-American residents with Federal Housing Administration (FHA) funds.

It was listed on the National Register of Historic Places in 2020.
