= Wester Ogle =

Historic house in Maryland, United States

- U.S. National Register of Historic Places
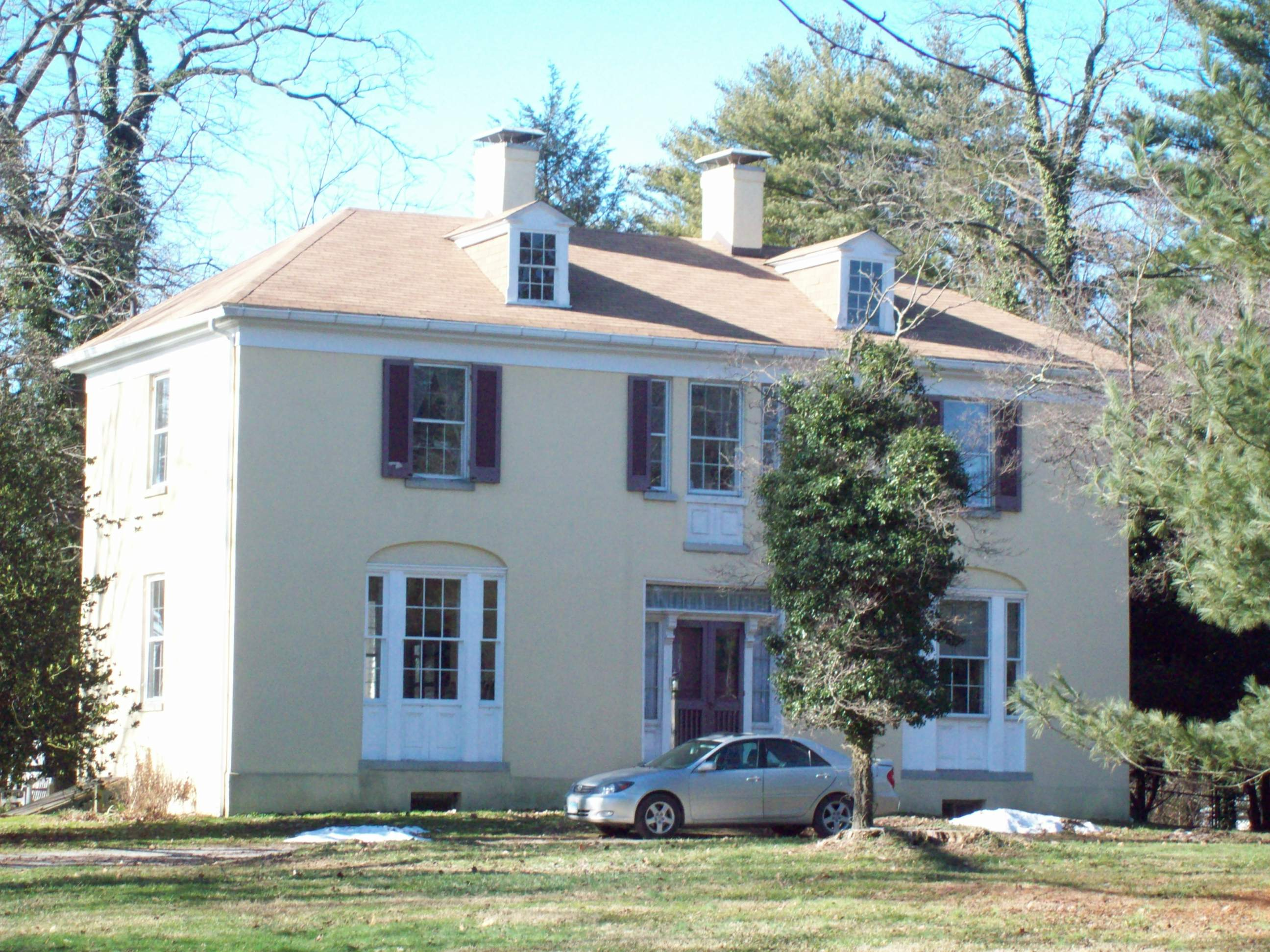
- Wester Ogle, December 2009

- Location within Maryland Location within the United States
- Location: 8948-8950 Reisterstown Road (MD 140), Pikesville, Maryland
- Coordinates: 39°23′31″N 76°45′1″W
- Area: 7.5 acres (3.0 ha)
- Built: 1840
- Architect: Orum, John
- NRHP reference No.: 85000058
- Added to NRHP: January 11, 1985

Wester Ogle is a historic home located at Pikesville, Baltimore County, Maryland, United States. It is a large, Federal-influenced house constructed about 1842. It is constructed of stucco-covered stone, and stands three stories high over an excavated basement, three bays wide by one room deep. Also on the property are a 1 1/2-story stone-and-frame tenant house and the stone foundations of a 19th-century barn and a stable. The property upon which Wester Ogle is located has remained in the Lyon family since approximately 1745.

Wester Ogle was listed on the National Register of Historic Places in 1985.
