= Towson Academy =

- U.S. National Register of Historic Places
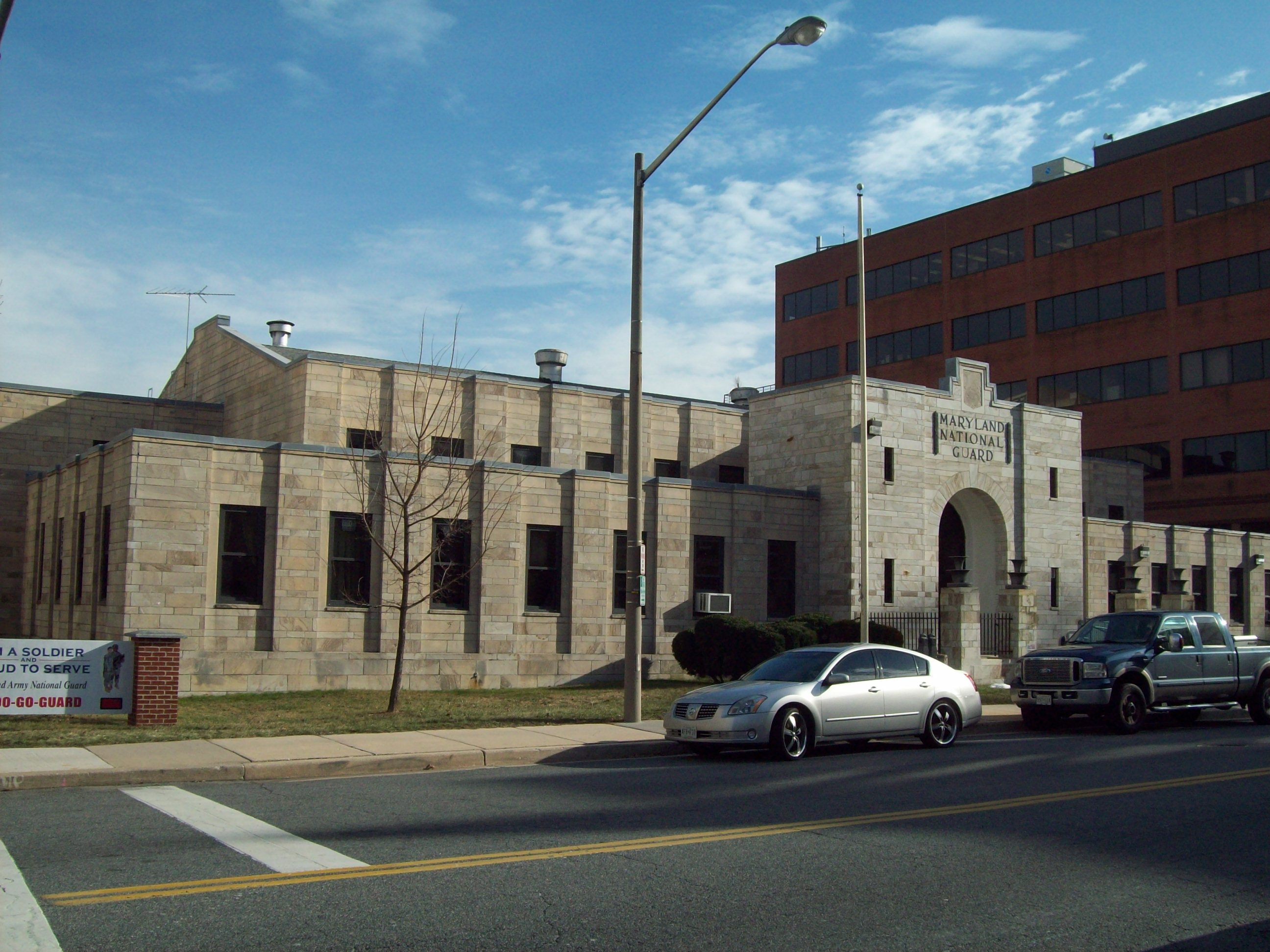
- Towson Academy, December 2009

- Location within Maryland Location within the United States
- Location: Washington St. & Chesapeake Ave., Towson, Maryland
- Coordinates: 39°23′57.5″N 76°36′18.2″W
- Area: 0.6 acres (0.24 ha)
- Built: 1933
- Architectural style: Medieval
- MPS: Maryland National Guard Armories TR
- NRHP reference No.: 85002675
- Added to NRHP: September 25, 1985

Towson Academy is a historic National Guard armory building located at Towson, Baltimore County, Maryland. It is a two-story brick structure constructed in 1933 with full basement, faced with a smooth light-colored, marble-like stone veneer. It features a T-shaped plan with a two-story front "head house" section and a one-story perpendicular "drill hall" extending to the rear and its façade is detailed to recall Medieval fortifications, with towers flanking the central entrance.

It was listed on the National Register of Historic Places in 1985.
