= Plinlimmon Farm =

Historic house in Maryland, United States

- U.S. National Register of Historic Places
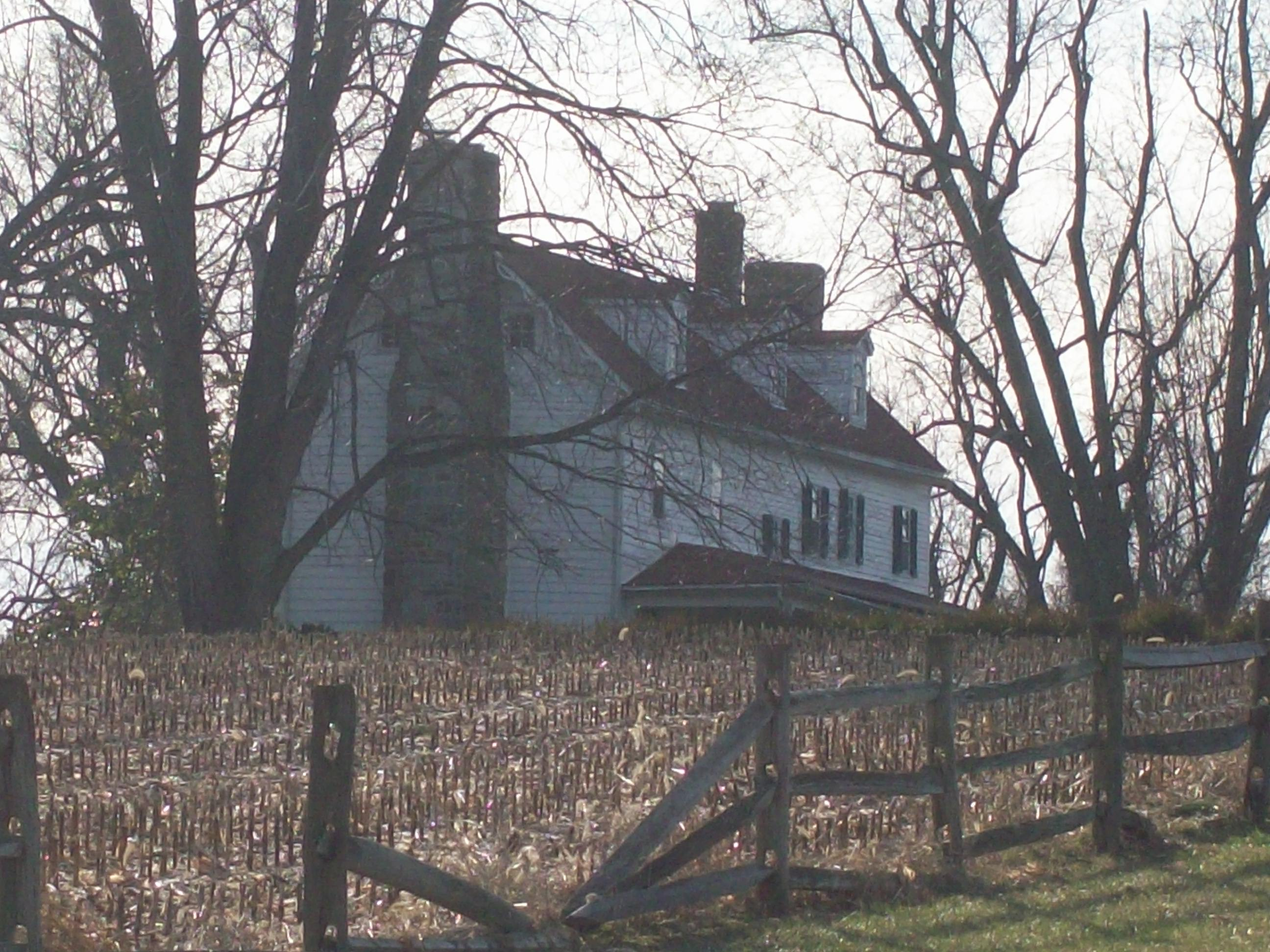
- Plinlimmon Farm, December 2009

- Location within Maryland Location within the United States
- Nearest city: Owings Mills, Maryland
- Coordinates: 39°23′35″N 76°47′59″W
- Area: 8 acres (3.2 ha)
- Built: 1839
- Architectural style: Colonial Revival, Vernacular
- NRHP reference No.: 83002943
- Added to NRHP: May 19, 1983

Plinlimmon Farm is a historic home and farm complex located at Owings Mills, Baltimore County, Maryland. It is an early 19th-century farmhouse of log construction clad in novelty siding. It is composed of six irregularly spaced bays, one room deep, and two and a half stories high with a gable roof. Also on the property is a stone building with a gable roof built about 1850, a frame two-bay garage, a small rectangular smokehouse built about 1850, a large mid-19th century cornhouse, and an early 20th-century frame barn.

It was listed on the National Register of Historic Places in 1983.
