= Outlaws of Ravenhurst =

Canadian rock band

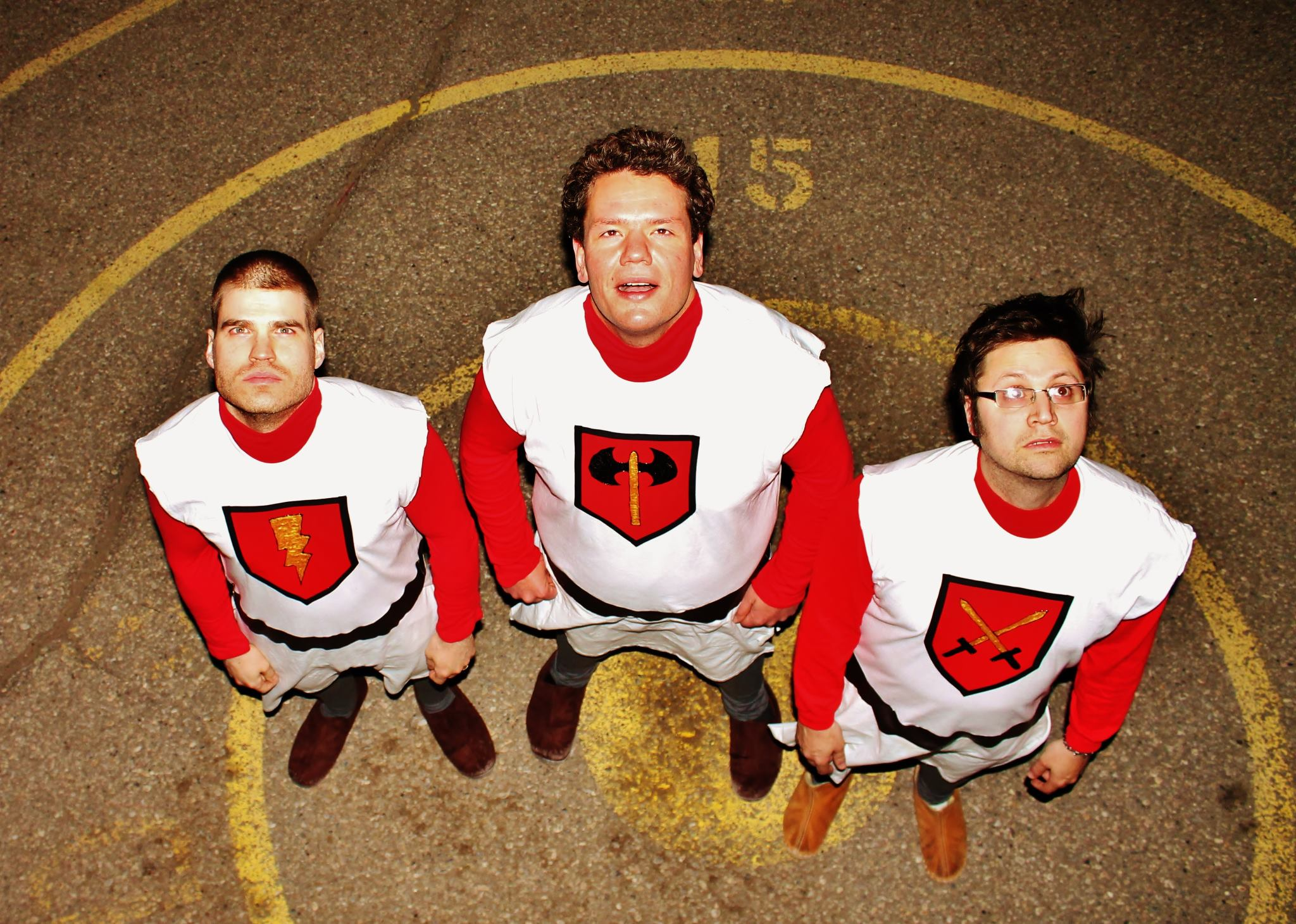

Background information
- Origin: Calgary, Alberta, Canada / Oberlin, Ohio, United States
- Genres: Hard rock, progressive rock, heavy metal
- Years active: 2005–present
- Labels: Powerfriends Records
- Members: Gabe Antal; Dan D'Agostino; Ken Murdoch; Skyler Mills
- Website: outlaws.bandcamp.com

Outlaws of Ravenhurst are a Canadian rock band from Calgary, Alberta. The band is composed of bassist Dan D'Agostino, guitarist and vocalist Ken Murdoch Jr., and drummer Gabe Antal. The band was first conceived by D'Agostino and Murdoch in Cologne, Germany as a concept loosely based on a book of the same title by Sister M. Imelda Wallace.

The band first released their debut album, Book I, in November 2011. The album was paid for by crowd funding through the website Kickstarter. It is a concept album that explores medieval themes of fantasy. The album reached the #1 spot of CJSW's "Loud" chart in 2012.

They were commissioned to write two songs for the soundtrack to the film Lloyd the Conqueror, featuring Brian Posehn, Mike Smith, and Harland Williams, along with fellow Canadian bands 3 Inches of Blood, Bison B.C., and Miesha and the Spanks. The band self-released a single of both songs on January 3, 2013; the soundtrack has a pending release on Century Media Records. It peaked at spot #8 of CJSW's "Top 30" chart.

Outlaws have been compared to "Triumph, Rush, Iron Maiden, and Slough Feg."

They have performed at Sled Island music festival in 2009 and 2012, and were scheduled to perform in 2013; however, due to the 2013 Alberta floods, it was cancelled. They released their sophomore album Book II in September 2013. It continued the concept of their debut album, and featured a heavier sound favorably compared to Iron Maiden and Rush.

On February 22, 2018, during a 10th anniversary event celebrating their first live performance, the band announced the addition of fourth member: Skyler Mills of Calgary Thrash band W.M.D (When Minds Develop). They released their third album Myths & Legends on New Year's Eve 2019.
