= St. John's Church (Ruxton, Maryland) =

Historic church in Maryland, United States

- U.S. National Register of Historic Places
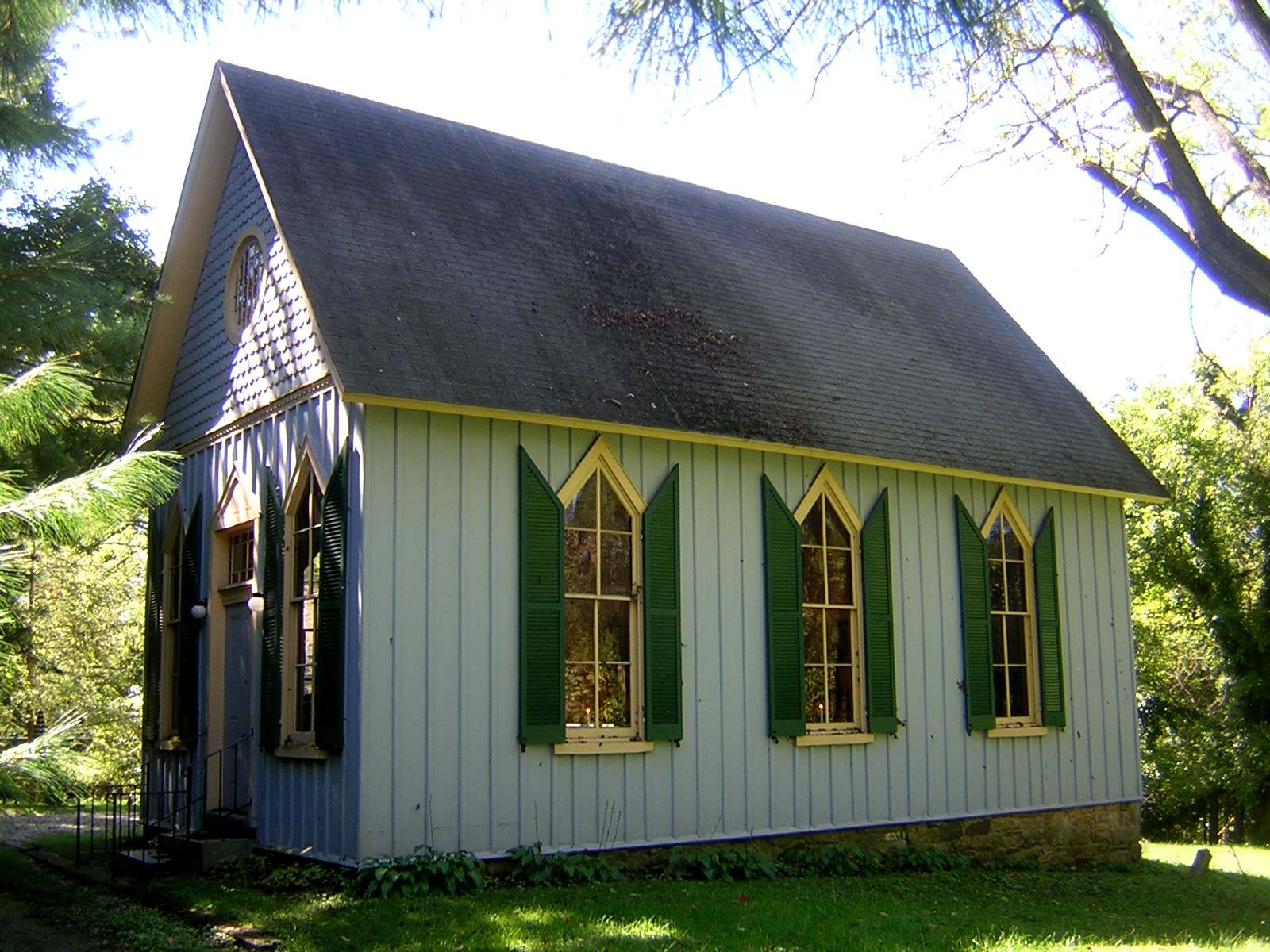
- North side

- Location within Maryland Location within the United States
- Location: 7538 Bellona Ave., Ruxton, Maryland
- Coordinates: 39°23′40.3″N 76°38′38.9″W
- Area: 0.8 acres (0.32 ha)
- Built: 1886
- Built by: Horn, George
- Architectural style: Gothic
- NRHP reference No.: 82002807
- Added to NRHP: March 15, 1982

St. John's Church is a historic A.U.M.P. church located in Ruxton, Baltimore County, Maryland.

== History ==
J. Aquila Scott, a free African-American, moved to the Bare Hills area in the 1820s, and in 1833, was named among the five trustees of a small congregation of the Bethel Episcopal Methodist Religious Society in a deed from Mary and Elijah Fishpaw. The deed was for three quarters of an acre of land in the northeast corner of the Hopyard tract on which to build a cemetery and Methodist church. The local African-American congregation, which had been meeting at Scott's home, established a parsonage and built a log cabin church on the plot.

== Architecture ==
The original log church burned in 1876. The current structure was completed in 1886 by Rev. Edward W. Scott, son of Aquila Scott, and is a frame Carpenter Gothic-style gable-roofed structure with board-and-batten siding, stylized lancet windows and decorative detailing. According to its National Register listing, "St. John's Church is particularly important as an exceptional example of African American church building in the late 19th century." For many years, the church was the center of spiritual life for the local African-American population, including those in Bare Hills and those working as live-in servants in Ruxton.

Attendance at the church declined in the 1960s, and the property was closed and largely forgotten until 1980, when Ruxton resident Gail B. O'Donovan discovered the chapel while researching a zoning issue. She rallied the community to raise $108,000 for the restoration of the church and a 1 1/2-story stuccoed stone house on the property, believed to date from about 1835, which was used as a parsonage and had suffered significant fire damage.

Also on the property are a simple frame rectangular social hall built in 1886 by Rev. Edward W. Scott and an extensive burial ground behind the church.

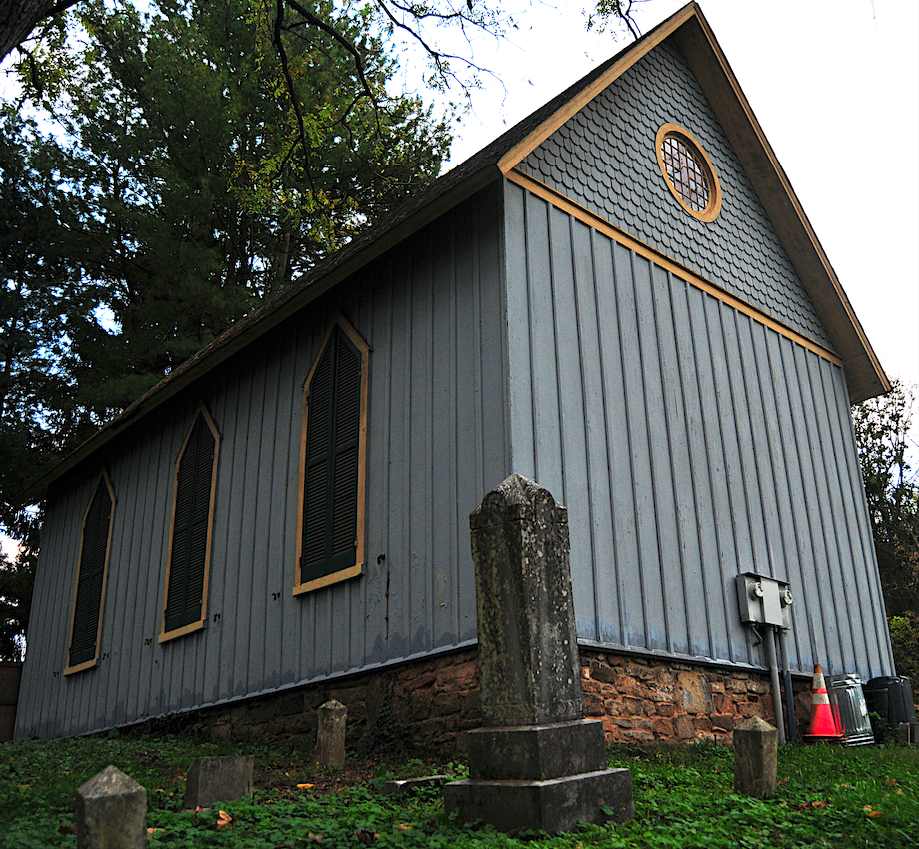
West & North sides of the building (the back of the building)

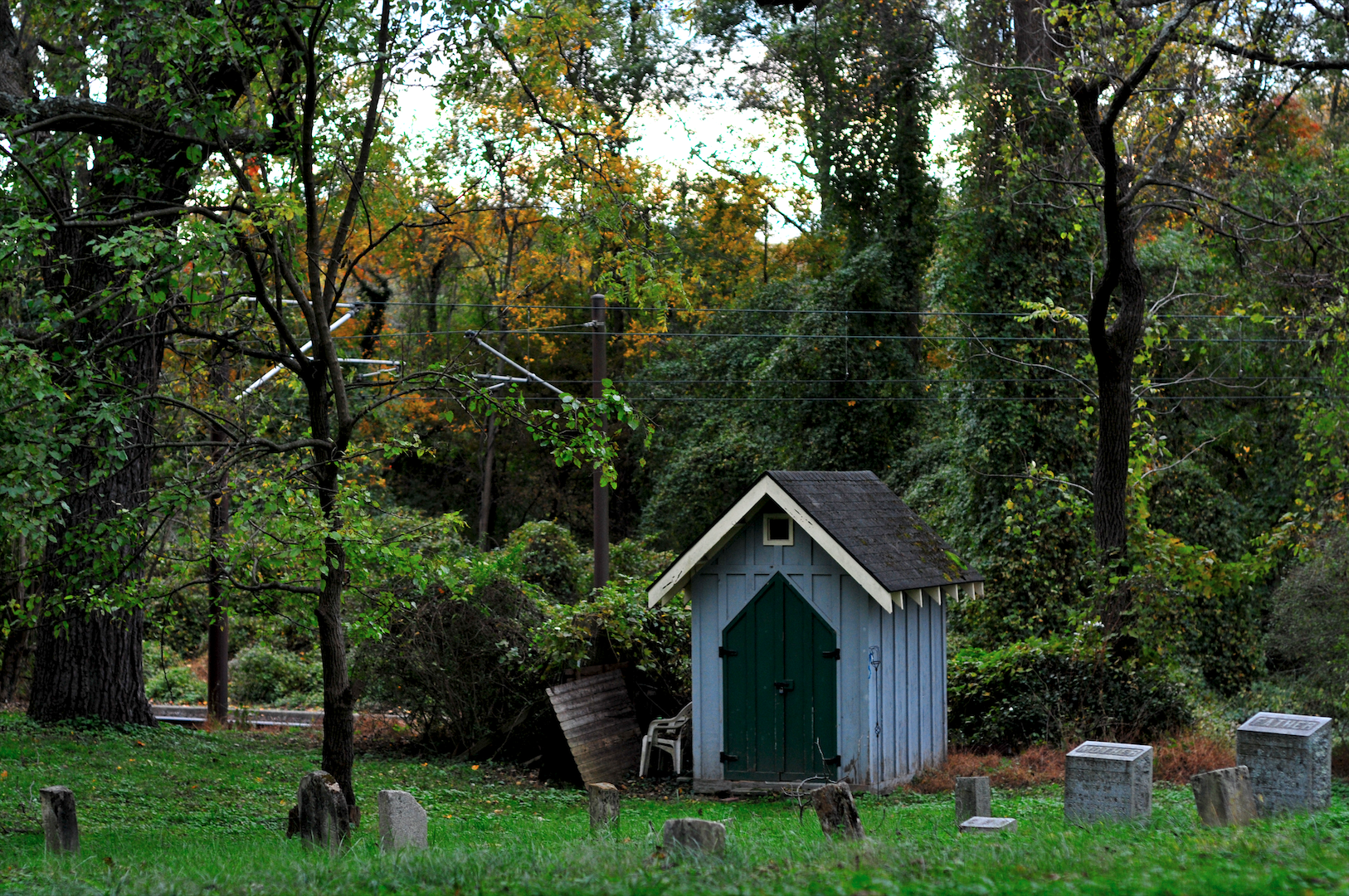
A shed behind St. Johns historic church in Ruxton, Maryland.

It was listed on the National Register of Historic Places on March 15, 1982, reference number 82002807.

== Gallery ==
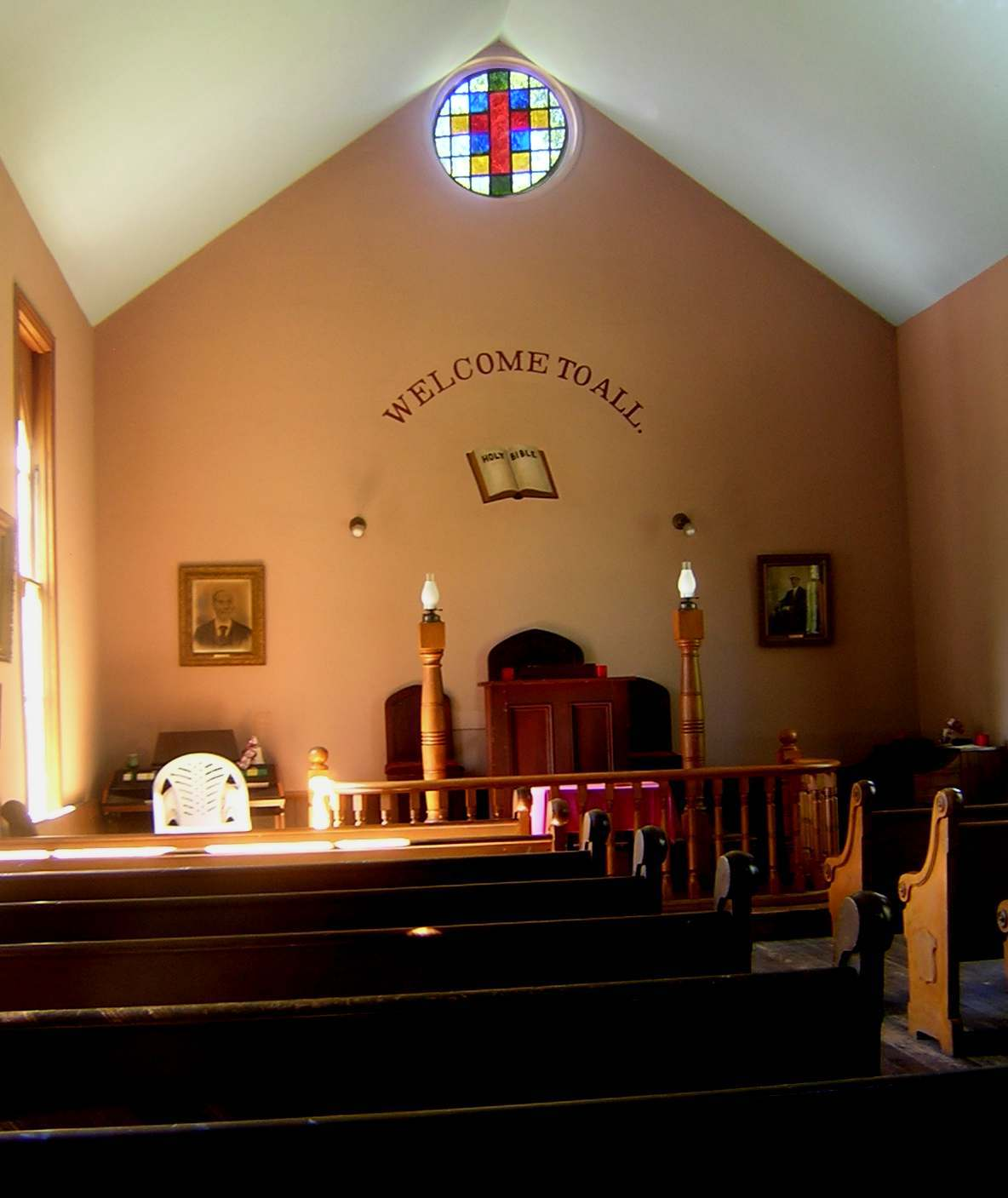

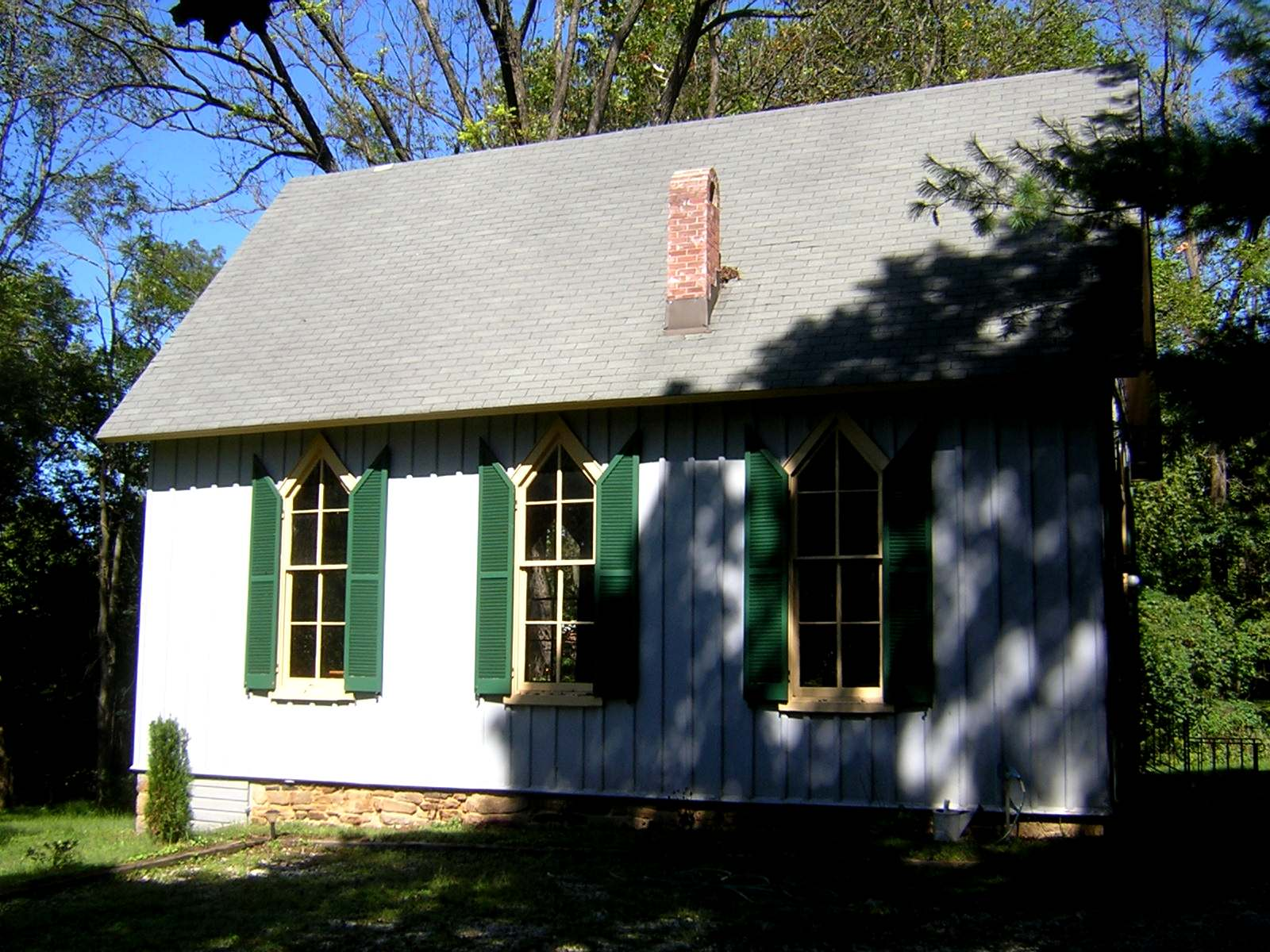
South side

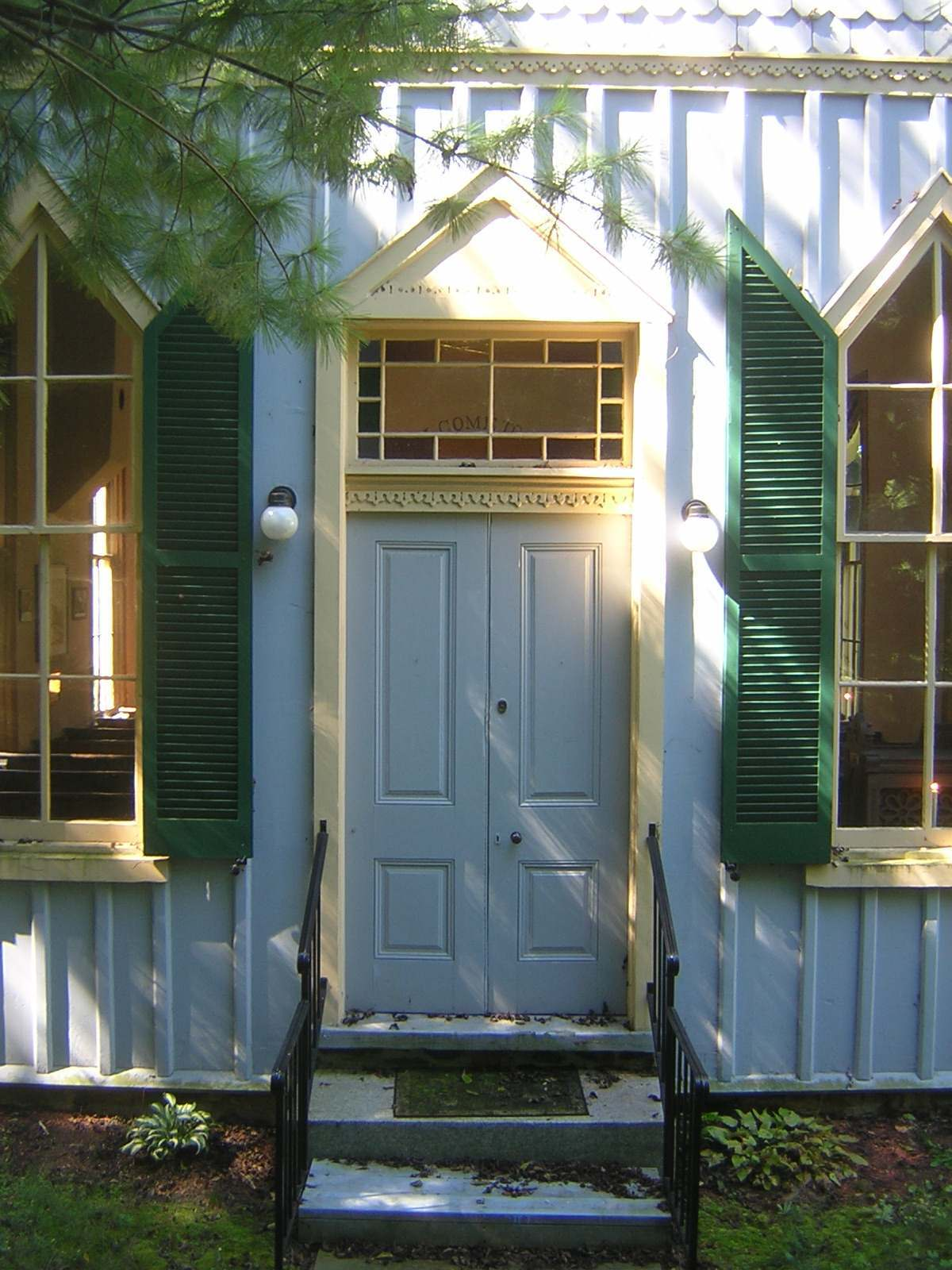
East side

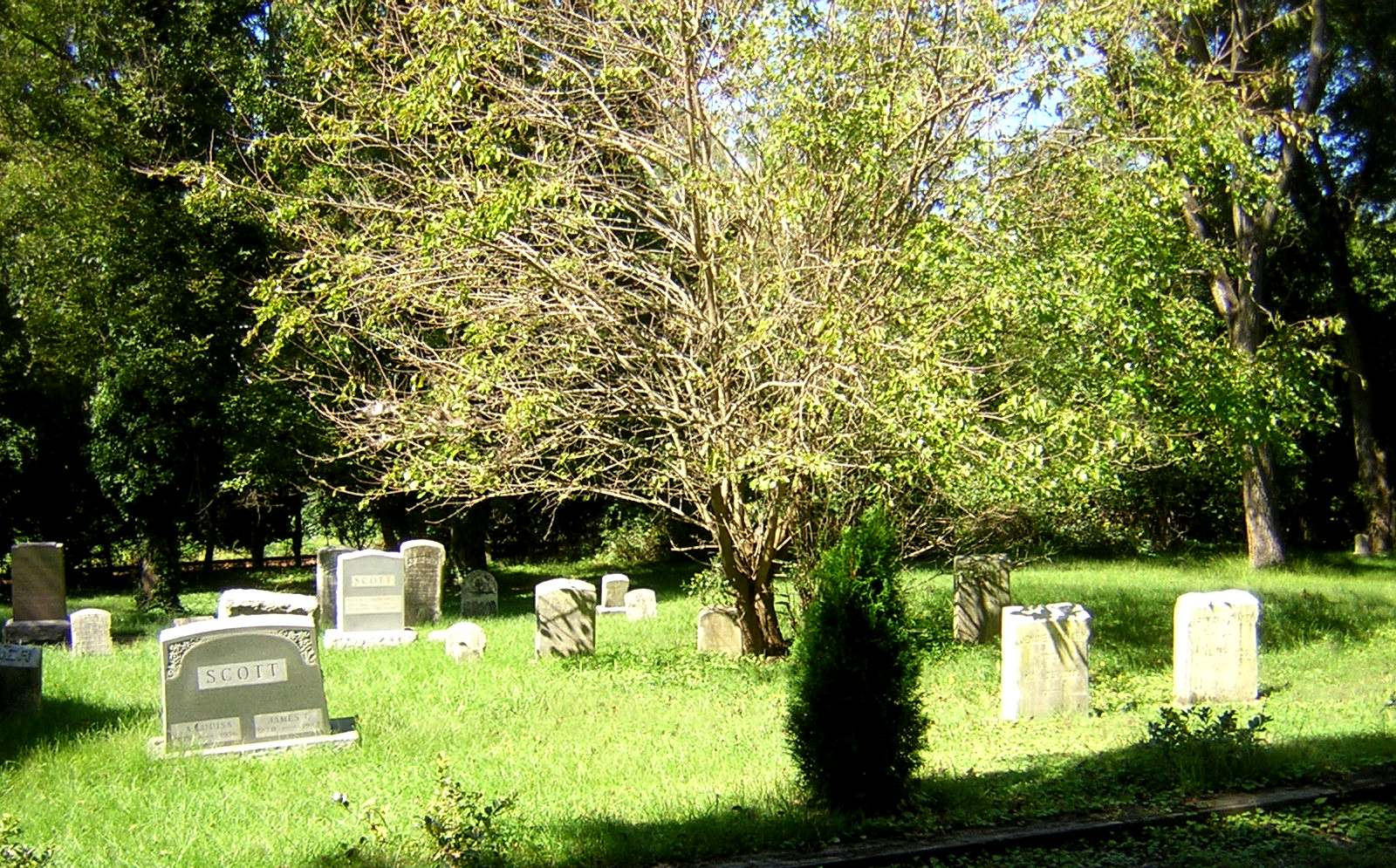
