= The Meadows (Owings Mills, Maryland) =

Historic house in Maryland, United States

- U.S. National Register of Historic Places
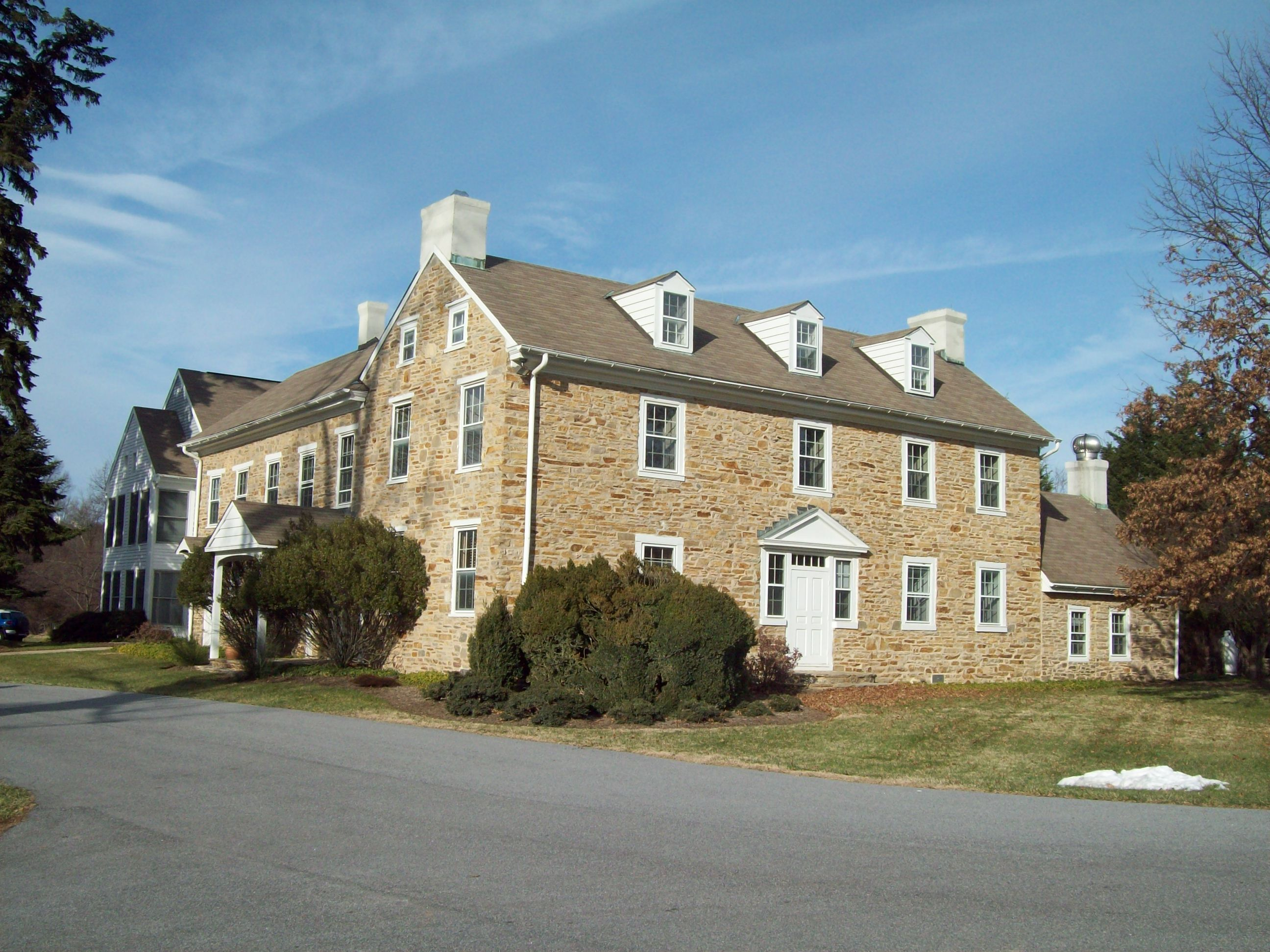
- The Meadows, December 2009

- Location within Maryland Location within the United States
- Location: 302 Meadows Ln., Owings Mills, Maryland
- Coordinates: 39°24′5″N 76°47′52″W
- Area: 5 acres (2.0 ha)
- Architectural style: Federal
- NRHP reference No.: 88000203
- Added to NRHP: March 23, 1988

The Meadows is a historic home and farm compound located at Owings Mills, Baltimore County, Maryland, United States. The house is an L-shaped 2 1/2-story stone house built in the 18th century and occupied for approximately 80 years by various members of the Owings family, for whom Owings Mills was named. Also on the property is a 2 1/2-story stone slave house, an 18th-century stone and timber stable, and a 2-story log and clapboard tenant house.

The Meadows was listed on the National Register of Historic Places in 1988.

== Gallery ==
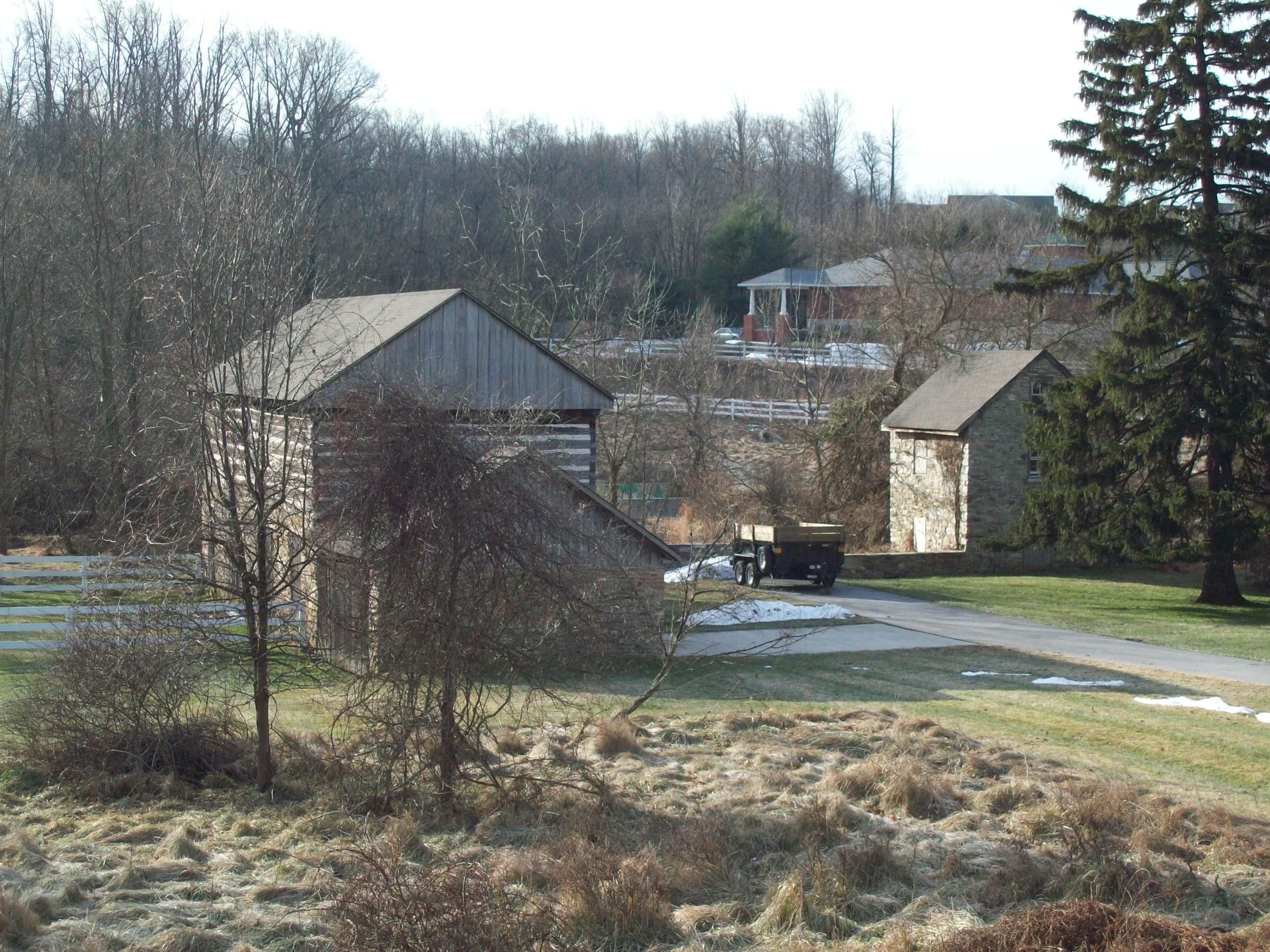
The Meadows-Outbuildings, December 2009
