= Glen Arm, Maryland =

Unincorporated community in Maryland, United States

- Unincorporated community
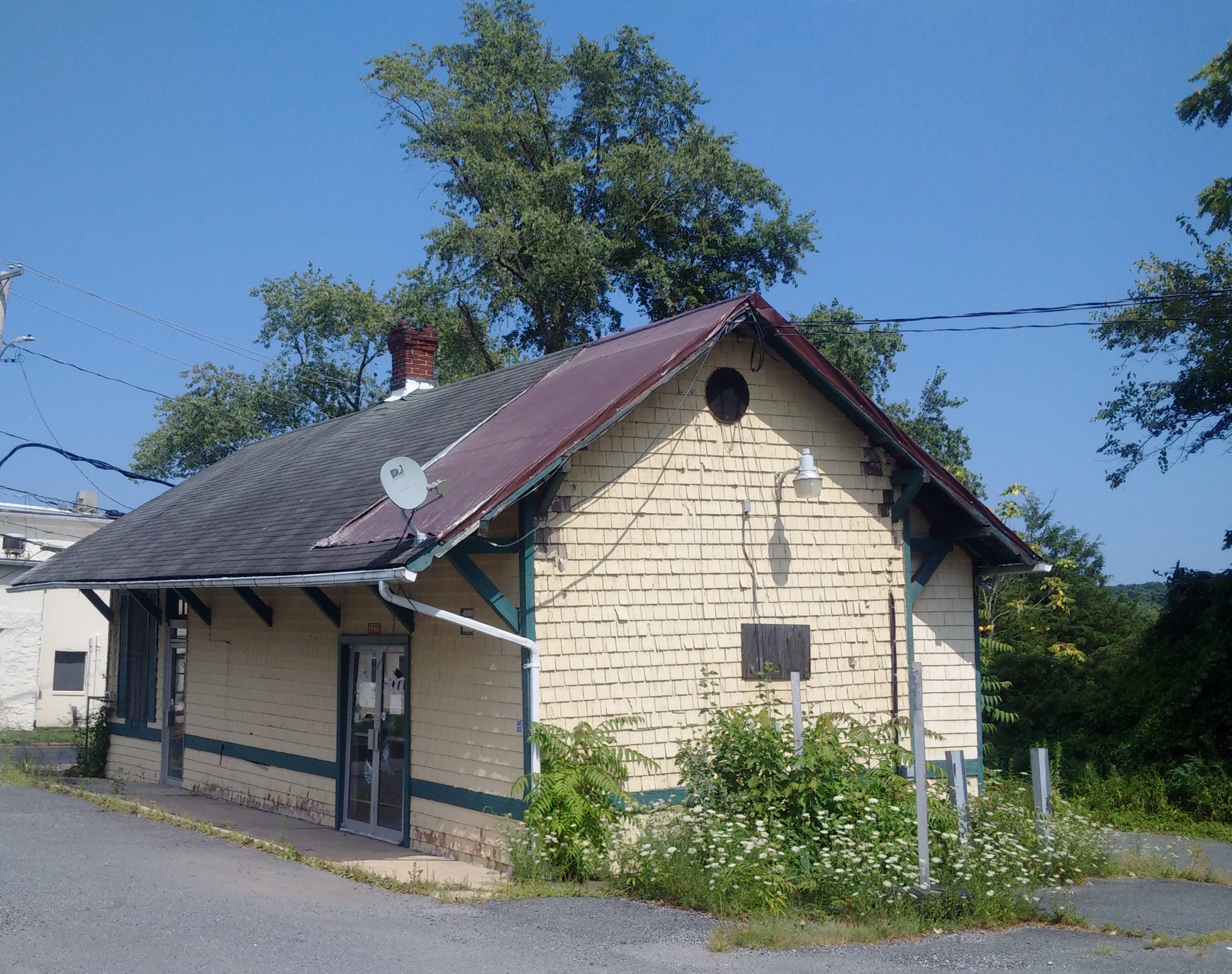
- The old Glen Arm "Ma and Pa" railroad station in 2019

- Location within the State of Maryland Glen Arm, Maryland (the United States)
- Coordinates: 39°27′12″N 76°29′40″W
- Country: United States
- State: Maryland
- County: Baltimore
- Time zone: UTC-5 (Eastern (EST))
  - Summer (DST): UTC-4 (EDT)
- ZIP codes: 21057

Glen Arm is an unincorporated community in Baltimore County, Maryland, United States. Glen Arm lies along what is now Glen Arm Road, which was once part of Old Harford Road, one of the early routes used for conveying agricultural products from parts of Harford and Baltimore Counties and southern Pennsylvania to the port of Baltimore. Glen Arm was also served until 1958 by the Maryland and Pennsylvania Railroad (the "Ma & Pa"). In 1921, at the railroad's crossing of Glen Arm Road, what generally is recognized as the nation's first train-actuated railroad crossing signal was installed by the railroad's Superintendent of Signals Charles Adler, Jr. Adler later designed early traffic-actuated traffic lights for the City of Baltimore, and also invented the system of flashing warning lights used on aircraft.

== Background ==
Glen Arm was once the home to a Grumman aircraft manufacturing plant. Today the building serves as the American headquarters of SUN Automation Group which makes feeding, printing and converting machinery for corrugated box production.

Ravenshurst, a historic Carpenter Gothic-style home in Glen Arm, was listed on the National Register of Historic Places in 1978. It was destroyed by fire in 1985.

In the 1990s Glen Arm was the center of the Towson Glen Arm music and art collective.

A notable resident of Glen Arm was Charles Joseph Bonaparte (1851–1921), whose country estate Bella Vista was in the area. Bonaparte, a great nephew of the French emperor Napoleon, served as United States Secretary of War and United States Attorney General under President Theodore Roosevelt. As Attorney General, Bonaparte established the Bureau of Investigation, which later became the FBI.

In August, 2019, the Baltimore County Council designated the old Ma & Pa Railroad station, built in 1909, as a protected historical landmark.

== See also ==
- C.C. Lang & Son
