= Belle Field =

Historic house in Maryland, United States

- Formerly listed on the U.S. National Register of Historic Places
- Location: Timonium Rd., Timonium, Maryland
- Area: 2.8 acres (1.1 ha)
- Built: 1782
- NRHP reference No.: 75000868

Significant dates
- Added to NRHP: October 29, 1975
- Removed from NRHP: May 12, 1986

Belle Field, also known as Timonium Mansion, was a historic home located at Timonium, Baltimore County, Maryland, United States. It was a large, two story structure, half brick and the other half stone, and sheathed in stucco. The brick section dated to about 1780. The house was built by Archibald Buchanan, a Baltimore merchant.

Belle Field was listed on the National Register of Historic Places in 1975. It was demolished in 1977, and subsequently delisted from the register in 1986.
