= Lime Kiln Bottom =

- U.S. National Register of Historic Places
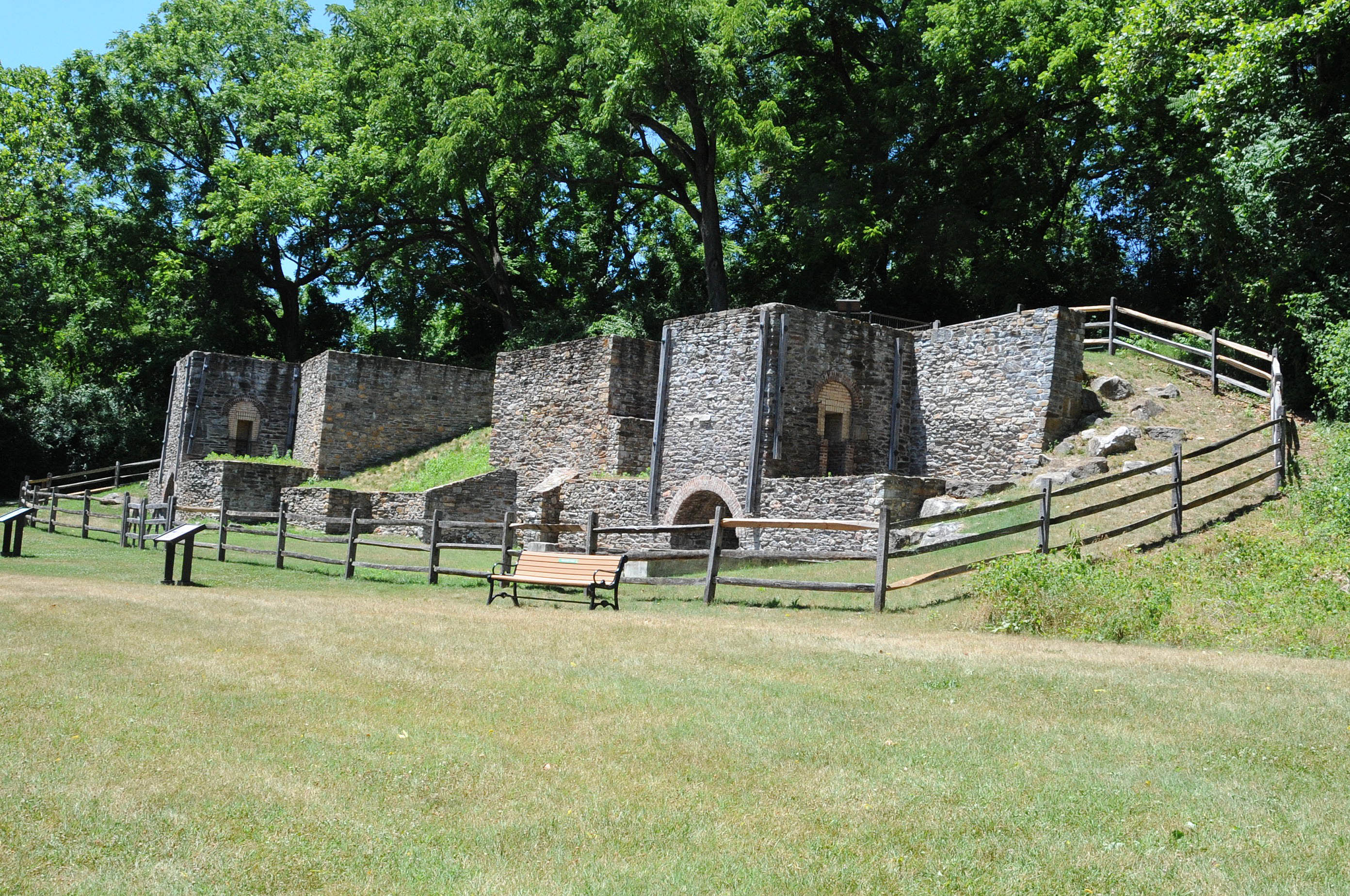
- Lime Kiln Bottom, June 2024

- Location within Maryland Location within the United States
- Location: 2177 Cromwell Bridge Rd., Parkville, Maryland
- Coordinates: 39°25′02″N 76°32′32″W
- Built: ca.1785 - ca.1915
- Built by: unknown
- NRHP reference No.: 100003655
- Added to NRHP: April 17, 2019

Lime Kiln Bottom is a historic stone and brick kiln complex located in Cromwell Valley Park at Parkville, Baltimore County, Maryland. The complex includes the Shanklin #1 (1893), Risteau #2 (ca. 1785), and Jenifer #3 (1883) kilns, and the Merrick Log House. The original stone and log structure of the Merrick Log House was built sometime between 1797 and 1805.

It was listed on the National Register of Historic Places in 2019.
