= The Wilderness (Catonsville, Maryland) =

Historic house in Maryland, United States

- U.S. National Register of Historic Places
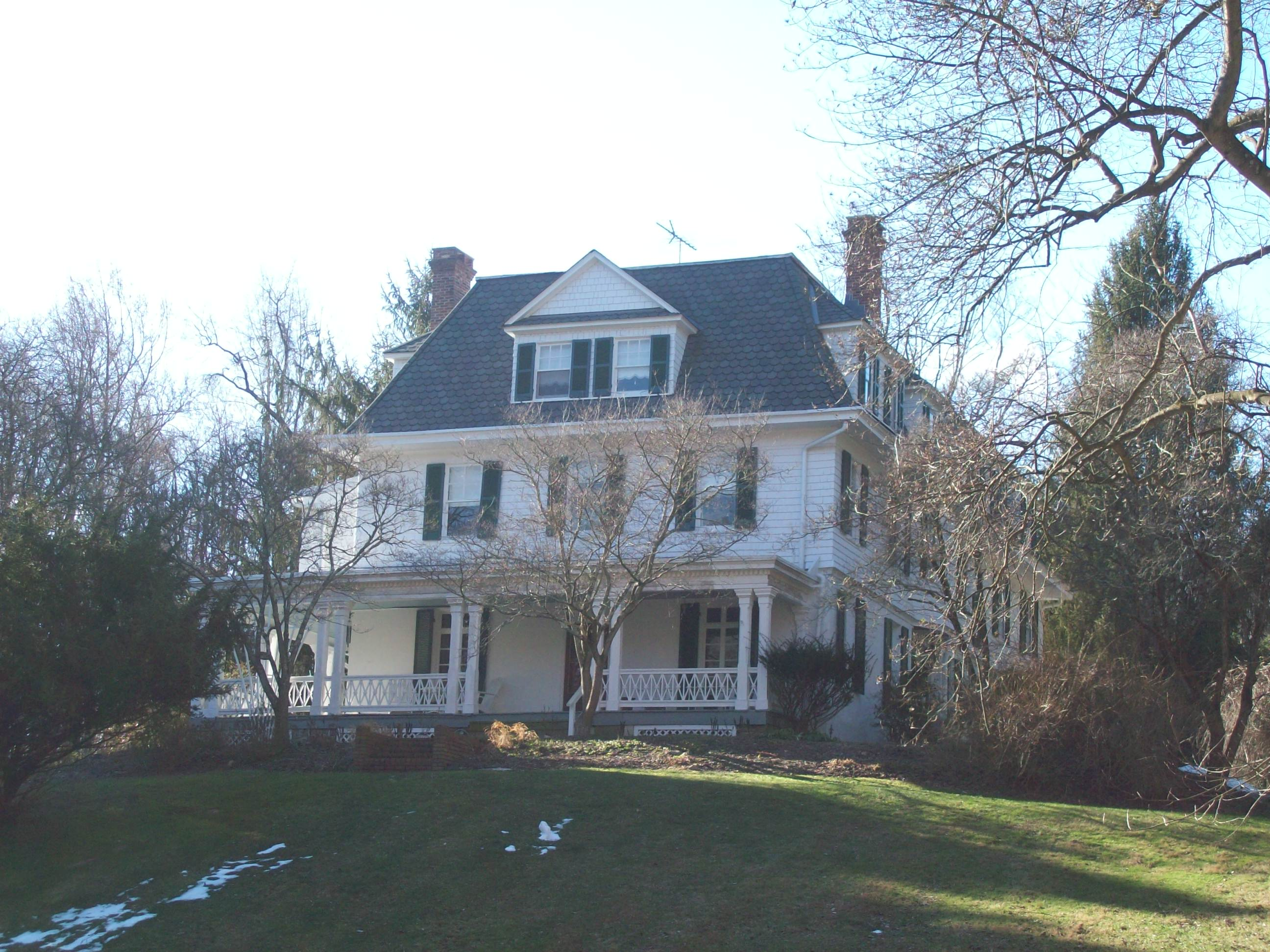
- The Wilderness, Catonsville MD, December 2009

- Location within Maryland Location within the United States
- Nearest city: Catonsville, Maryland
- Coordinates: 39°15′27″N 76°46′3″W
- Area: 17.6 acres (7.1 ha)
- Built: 1800
- Architectural style: Colonial Revival, Queen Anne
- NRHP reference No.: 85002173
- Added to NRHP: September 12, 1985

The Wilderness is a historic home located near Catonsville, Baltimore County, Maryland. It is a large stone and frame house located in a wooded setting west of Catonsville. The original home was built about 1800, and it attained its current appearance following a major expansion in 1899–1900, when it was a summer residence of Francis Cumberland Dugan II (1830-1914). It features multiple roof and dormer shapes and a wraparound porch reminiscent of the Queen Anne style. The third story is located within a tall mansard roof. Also on the property are a stone springhouse / smokehouse, a summer kitchen, log tenant house, and a large frame barn.

The house was listed on the National Register of Historic Places in 1985.
