= Villa Anneslie =

Historic house in Maryland, United States

- U.S. National Register of Historic Places
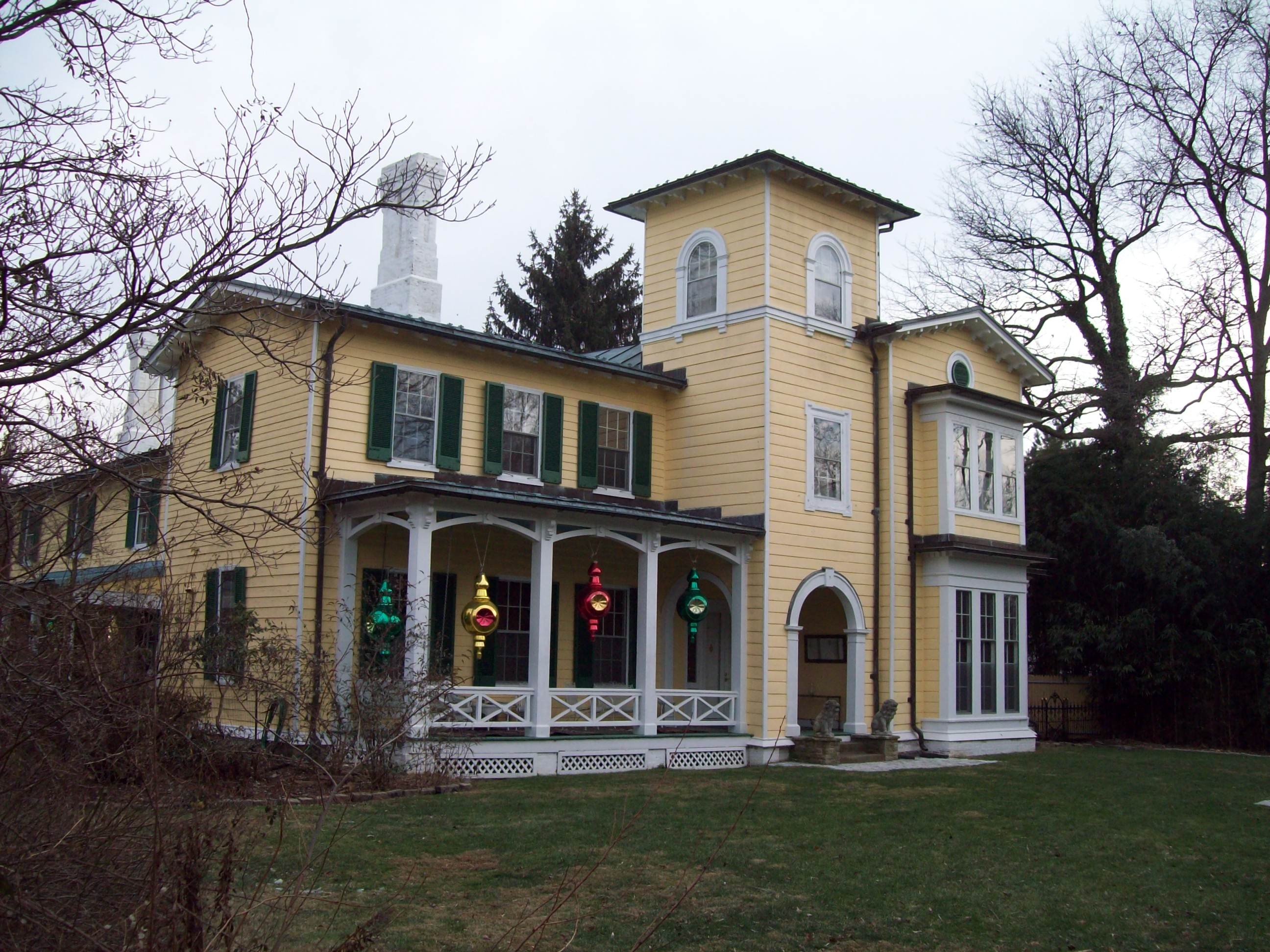
- Villa Anneslie, December 2009

- Location within Maryland Location within the United States
- Location: 529 Dunkirk Rd., Towson, Maryland
- Coordinates: 39°22′34″N 76°36′20″W
- Area: 0.8 acres (0.32 ha)
- Built: ca. 1855
- Architect: Niernsee, John Rudolph
- Architectural style: Italianate
- NRHP reference No.: 77000685
- Added to NRHP: December 13, 1977

Villa Anneslie is a historic home located at Towson, Baltimore County, Maryland, United States. It was built about 1855 as a summer home. Designed by architect John Rudolph Niernsee, it is an Italianate two-story villa built in brick and covered in clapboard. It features an asymmetrical design with a central three story tower over the entrance.

Villa Anneslie was listed on the National Register of Historic Places in 1977.
