= Ravenshurst =

Historic house in Maryland, United States

- U.S. National Register of Historic Places
- Location within Maryland Location within the United States
- Location: 4205 Antique Lane, Glen Arm, Maryland
- Coordinates: 39°28′48″N 76°31′50″W
- Area: 4 acres (1.6 ha)
- Built: 1800, 1854-1857
- Architectural style: Gothic, Carpenter Gothic
- NRHP reference No.: 78001443
- Added to NRHP: August 14, 1978

Ravenshurst, or Ravenhurst, was a historic home located at Glen Arm, Baltimore County, Maryland, United States. It was a 2 1/2-story Carpenter Gothic-style board-and batten house built about 1854–1857. It was an addition to an earlier stone building thought to have been built about 1800. The home burned on October 31, 1985.

Ravenshurst was listed on the National Register of Historic Places in 1978.
