= Maryland Route 25 =

State highway in Maryland, US

Maryland Route 25
- Falls Road
- Maryland Route 25 highlighted in red

Route information
- Maintained by Baltimore DOT and MDSHA
- Length: 26.89 mi (43.28 km)
- Existed: 1927–present
- Tourist routes: Falls Road Scenic Byway; Mason and Dixon Scenic Byway; Horses and Hounds Scenic Byway

Major junctions
- South end: MD 2 in Baltimore
- I-83 in Baltimore; MD 133 near Brooklandville; MD 25A in Brooklandville; MD 130 in Brooklandville; MD 131 in Brooklandville; MD 128 in Butler; MD 88 near Butler; MD 137 near Hampstead
- North end: Beckleysville Road near Alesia

Location
- Country: United States
- State: Maryland
- Counties: City of Baltimore, Baltimore

Highway system
- Maryland highway system; Interstate; US; State; Scenic Byways
← MD 24	→ MD 26

Maryland Route 25 (MD 25), locally known for nearly its entire length as Falls Road, is a state highway in the U.S. state of Maryland. It begins north of downtown Baltimore, just north of Penn Station, and continues north through Baltimore County to Beckleysville Road near the Pennsylvania state line. The road passes through the communities of Hampden, Medfield, Cross Keys, and Mount Washington in the city, and Brooklandville and Butler in Baltimore County. The entire length of MD 25 that uses Falls Road—and its county-maintained continuation north to Alesia—is a Maryland Scenic Byway, named the Falls Road Scenic Byway.

== Route description ==
=== City of Baltimore ===
MD 25 begins as a one-way pair, Lafayette Street westbound and Lanvale Street eastbound, at the one-way pair comprising MD 2, Calvert Street northbound and St. Paul Street southbound, in the Charles North neighborhood of Baltimore and within the North Central Historic District. Lafayette Street and Lanvale Street head west as two-lane streets and intersects another one-way pair of streets, northbound Charles Street and southbound Maryland Avenue. Within the Charles–Lafayette–Maryland–Lanvale block is a plethora of historic sites: the Hans Schuler Studio and Residence on Lafayette Street, the Charles Theatre and Baltimore City Passenger Railway Power House and Car Barn on Charles Street, and rowhouses comprising the Buildings at 1601–1830 St. Paul Street and 12–20 E. Lafayette Street.

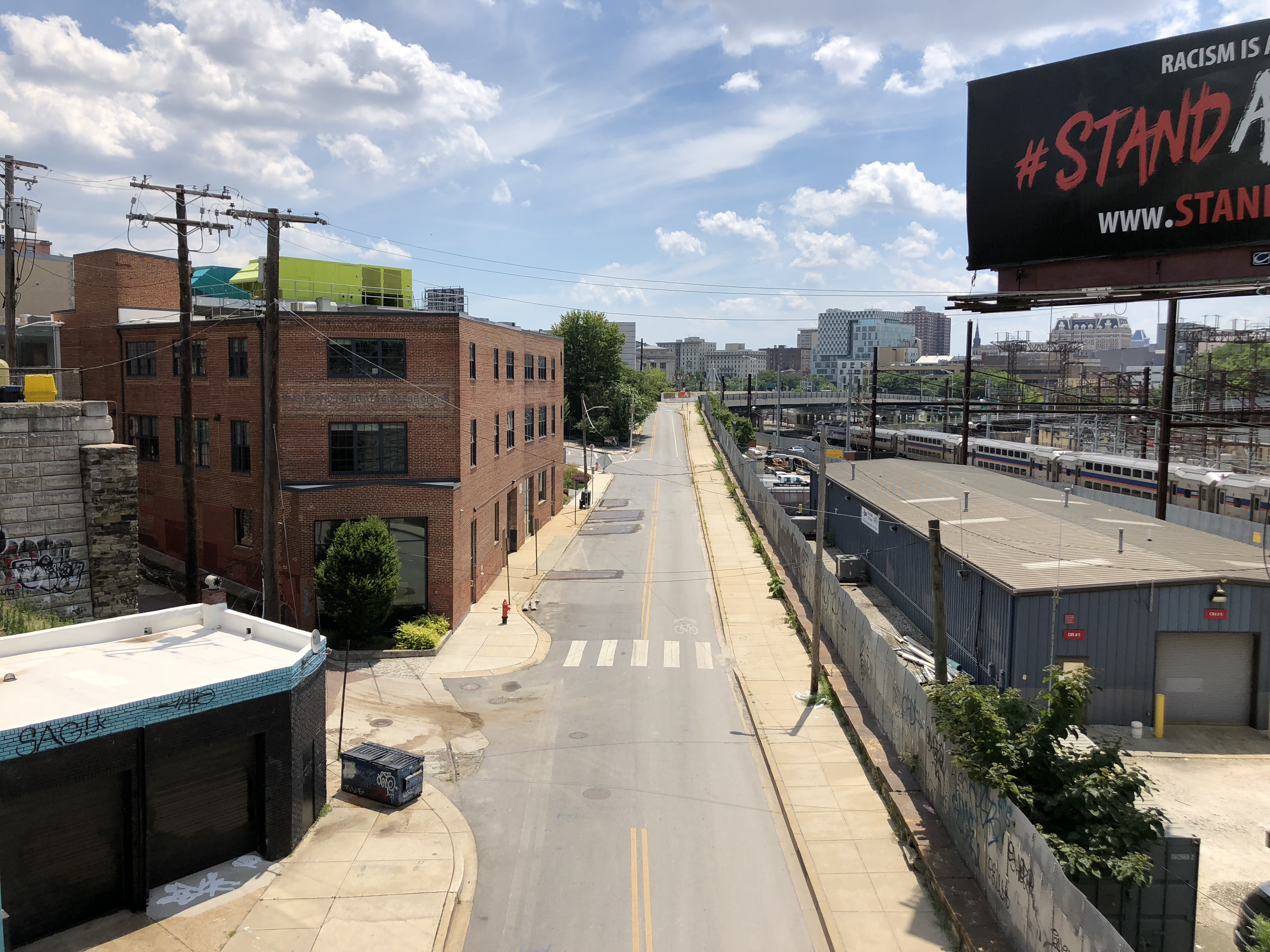
View south along MD 25 from North Howard Street, just north of MD 25's southern terminus

West of Maryland Avenue, Lafayette Street and Lanvale Street merge into two-lane undivided Falls Road, which curves northwest and briefly parallels Amtrak's Northeast Corridor railroad line, which enters Penn Station serving Amtrak and MARC's Penn Line to the southeast. As the railroad tracks veer away toward Washington, MD 25 begins to parallel the east side of Jones Falls and MTA Maryland's Baltimore Light RailLink line, which is on the west side of the stream, at the southern end of the stream's deep valley. The highway passes underneath the Howard Street and US 1/US 40 Truck (North Avenue) bridges and by the Baltimore Streetcar Museum buildings and sheds. MD 25 parallels MTA Maryland's Route 25, which comprises the reconstructed streetcar tracks used for streetcar rides from the museum site north under CSX's Baltimore Terminal Subdivision railroad line and past the remains of a roundhouse to the Museum's streetcar turning loop just south of the 28th Street and 29th Street's bridges over the Jones Falls valley. MD 25 passes under Wyman Park Drive just south of the former Stieff Silver Company factory building and Mount Vernon Mill No. 1 (recently renovated for apartments and condos), down the hill from the Stone Hill Historic District.

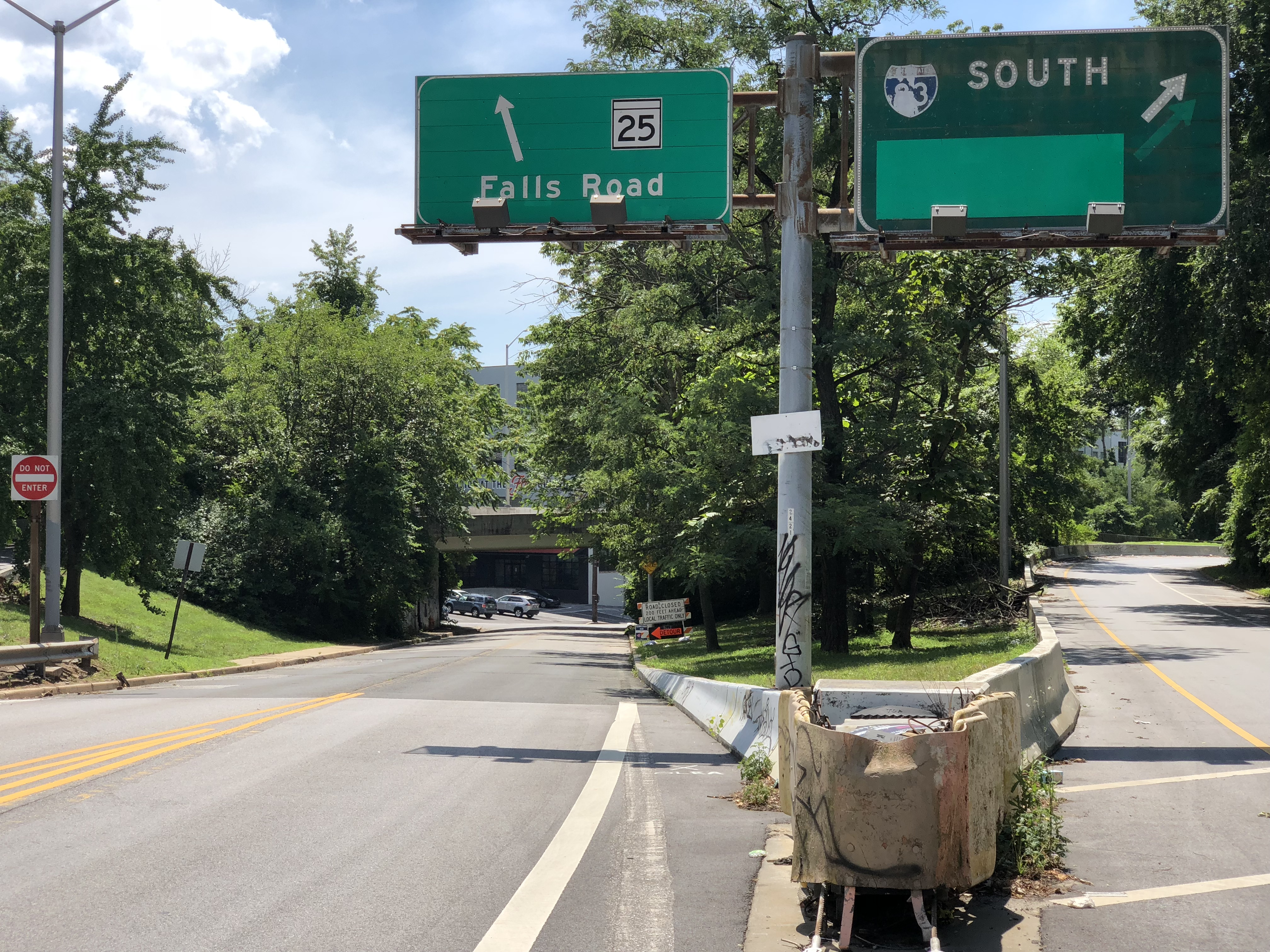
MD 25 southbound at I-83 southbound in Baltimore

At the southern end of the Hampden neighborhood to the east and the Woodberry community on the western hills, MD 25 ascends from the Jones Falls valley and temporarily expands to a four-lane divided street at its ramps with I-83 (Jones Falls Expressway). The partial interchange, which includes ramps from southbound MD 25 to southbound I-83 and from northbound I-83 to northbound MD 25, is next to the historic home "Evergreen on the Falls" now occupied by the Maryland association of the Society for the Prevention of Cruelty to Animals (SPCA). The street becomes undivided and reduces to two lanes at the main street of Hampden, 36th Street or The Avenue. North of 41st Street, MD 25 passes between the neighborhoods of Medfield to the west and Hoes Heights on the east. The highway intersects Cold Spring Lane next to the joint campus of the Baltimore Polytechnic Institute (Baltimore City public high school specializing in math, science, engineering and technology) and the all-girls Western High School and passes between the Village of Cross Keys (an apartment-condo complex with a small shopping center/mall) on the west and the community of Roland Park on the hills above to the east as a four-lane undivided highway. MD 25 intersects Northern Parkway, (built over and segmented with former Belvedere Avenue) then descends again into the Jones Falls valley and passes through the center of Mount Washington. The neighborhood contains the North Baltimore Aquatic Club, where American Olympics team member Michael Phelps trained, and an intersection with Kelly Avenue and its Bridge which connects to the west with the hilly community of Mount Washington, where the highway reduces to two lanes. Here also is the former campus of old Mount Saint Agnes College for women, and its famous "Octagon House", now a corporate campus for several financial and insurance companies), MD 25 leaves the city of Baltimore at its 1919 City Limits just south of West Lake Avenue.

=== Baltimore to Alesia ===
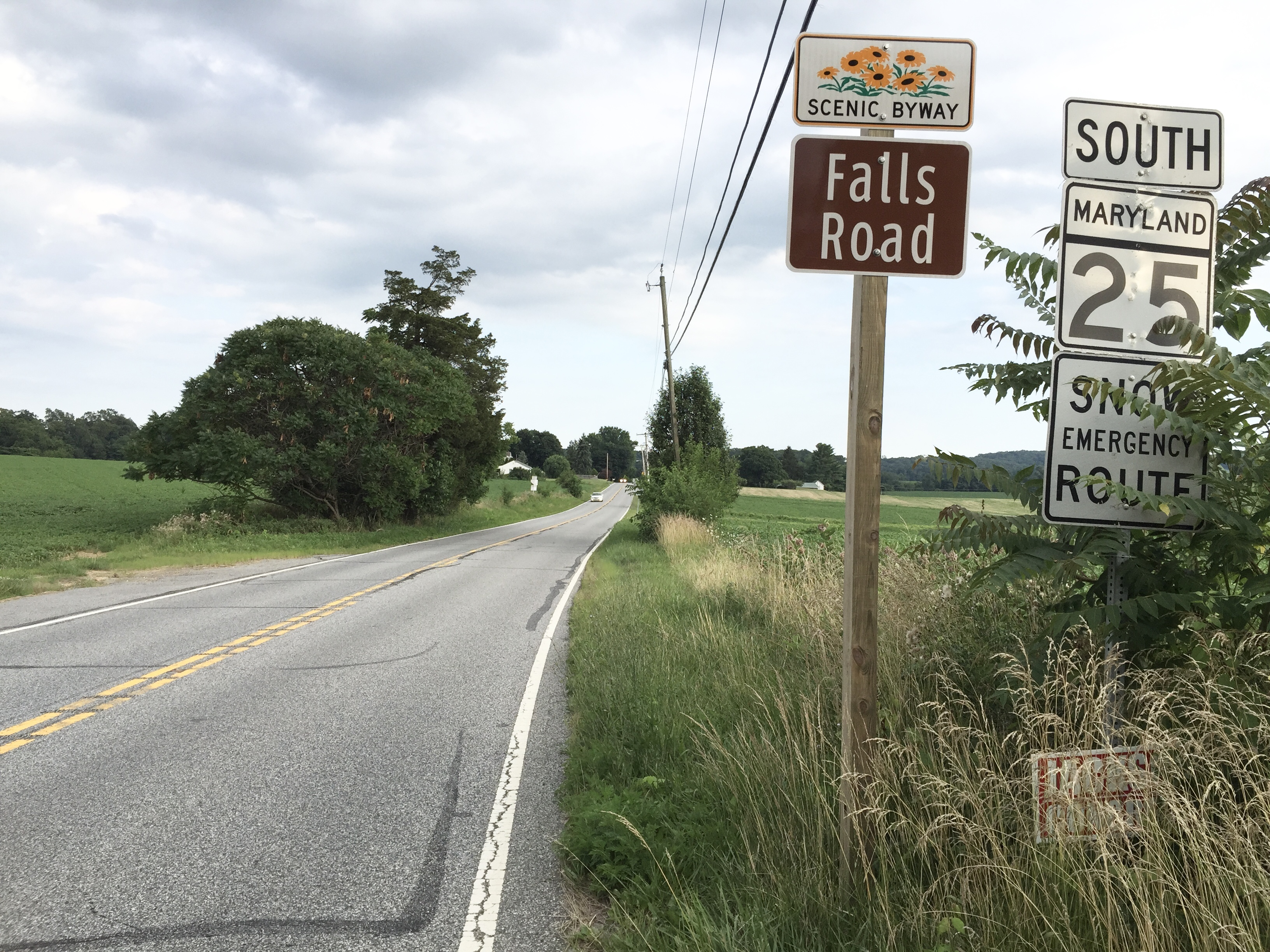
View south along MD 25 at MD 137 in Whitehouse

MD 25 enters the Bare Hills Historic District and Bare Hills area of Baltimore County. The state highway crosses over the Baltimore Light RailLink line again and the Jones Falls next to the Falls Road station. The station is accessed via unsigned MD 746 (Lakeside Drive), which partially runs underneath MD 25 along the latter highway's overpass on its way to the station parking lot. The state highway ascends from the stream valley and curves northwest between Lake Roland Park with its historic Lake Roland and dam from the old 1860 city waterworks system to the northeast and the Bare Hills House on the southbound side of the highway. MD 25 continues north through a well-forested affluent area between Towson (county seat of Baltimore County) to the east and Pikesville to the west with its headquarters for the Maryland State Police. The highway descends to and crosses Jones Falls twice on either side of an underpass of I-83. To the north of the second crossing of the stream, MD 25 has a four-leg intersection with MD 133 (Old Court Road) and Ruxton Road; the latter road has a half-diamond interchange with I-83 that allows access to and from Baltimore. North of MD 133, the highway passes the Rockland Historic District and the historic home "Rockland" in the community of Brooklandville.

MD 25 crosses over I-695 (Baltimore Beltway) then passes "The Cloisters" (former Baltimore City children's museum) and the Brooklandville House before crossing Jones Falls one last time at the east end of the Green Spring Valley as the highway enters Brooklandville. MD 25 has a ramp to the Jones Falls Expressway as the road begins to parallel the expressway. The highway, which is unsigned MD 25A north of I-695 (at which point I-83 continues east on I-695 to follow the Baltimore-Harrisburg Expressway), has its northern terminus at an orthogonal intersection with MD 25 and Joppa Road, which heads east toward Towson. MD 25 makes a sharp turn east at the north end of the parallel section, then turns north onto a four-lane divided highway extending north from the freeway. The highway passes through a commercial area to MD 130 (Greenspring Valley Road), north of which the highway becomes two lanes again. At the northern end of Brooklandville, the state highway meets the western end of MD 131 (Seminary Avenue) and passes by the campuses of Maryvale Preparatory School and Episcopal Church twin institutions, St. Paul's School (for boys) and St. Paul's School for Girls, founded by Old St. Paul's Church in downtown Baltimore at North Charles and East Saratoga Streets, the area's oldest church, founded 1692. MD 25 continues through the region of estate homes until the highway reaches Shawan Road and Tufton Avenue at the hamlet of Shawan, north of which the landscape shifts to farmland.

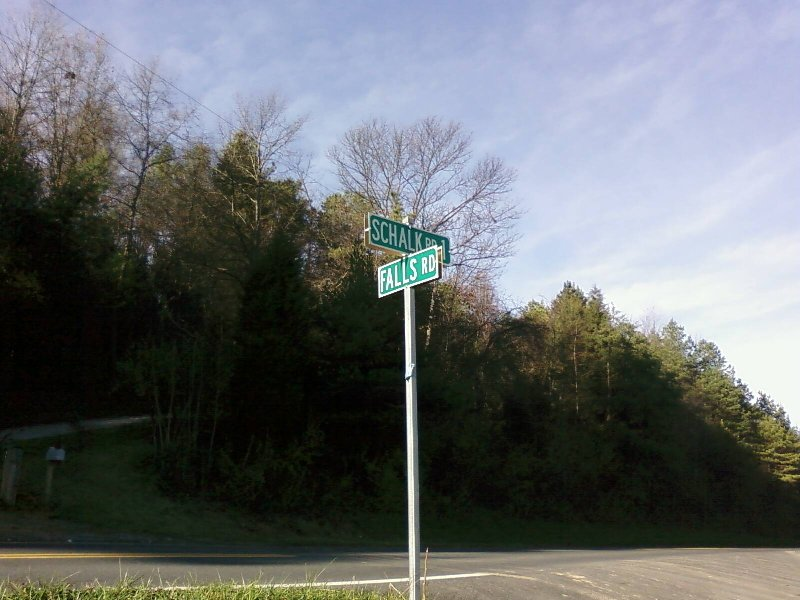
The northern end of Falls Road at Schalk Road No. 1 near Alesia

MD 25 crosses Western Run and passes through the village of Butler, where the highway meets MD 128 (Butler Road). The highway follows Blackrock Run and Indian Run through a pair of ridges. At the second ridge, MD 25 has a Y intersection with MD 88 (Black Rock Road) at Coopersville. The state highway crosses Blackrock Run again and intersects MD 137 (Mount Carmel Road) at Whitehouse between Hampstead and Hereford. MD 25 reaches its northern terminus at Beckleysville Road west of Beckleysville and Prettyboy Reservoir near the Baltimore–Carroll county line. Falls Road continues northwest for 4.2 miles (6.8 km) as a county highway into northeastern Carroll County. Just north of its intersection with Hoffmanville Road near Alesia, the highway becomes a narrow gravel road. Falls Road has a grade crossing of CSX's Hanover Subdivision, then becomes a paved road again shortly before its northern terminus at Schalk Road No. 1 near Gunpowder Falls north of Alesia and south of Lineboro near the Maryland–Pennsylvania state line.

== History ==
=== Turnpike ===
On the December 27, 1791, the Maryland General Assembly authorized Elisha Tyson, William & Charles Jessop, John Ellicott, George Leggett, Robert Long, Jacob Hart, and John Stricker to lay out a road, not to exceed 40 feet (12 m) wide, from their flour mill-seats on Jones Falls, then in Baltimore County, southerly to Baltimore Town, thereafter known as the Falls Road. ^{[20]} On January 19, 1805, A company known as 'The President, Managers and Company, of the Falls Turnpike Road', more commonly called the 'Falls Turnpike', was incorporated and chartered by the Maryland General Assembly. The company was authorized to build and operate a turnpike "for the accommodation of the inhabitants on Jones's Falls, and the country adjacent", running from "the ford by Messieurs [William] Patterson and [John] Stricker's mill" northerly to "the cross roads by the limekiln of Richard Caton" (Brooklandville). Construction was to begin within two years and finish within five. (Completion was extended to January 1, 1813, by the General Assembly on December 23, 1808.) The law included a statement that "it would be unjust and improper to extend the said turnpike so as to make the same intersect the York-town turnpike...drawing off from said road any portion of the trade that now passes down the said road into Old-town, in the city of Baltimore", but allowed the Falls Turnpike to extend south to the York-town Turnpike (Greenmount Avenue) "at or near a stone bridge opposite the old mill of Josiah Pennington" (Belvidere Street across Jones Falls, just south of Hoffman Street and east of Barclay Street) with the consent of that company. A law passed January 25, 1806 allowed the company to build this extension without the approval of the York-town Turnpike. On December 28, 1812, the General Assembly "confirmed and established" the completed roadway.

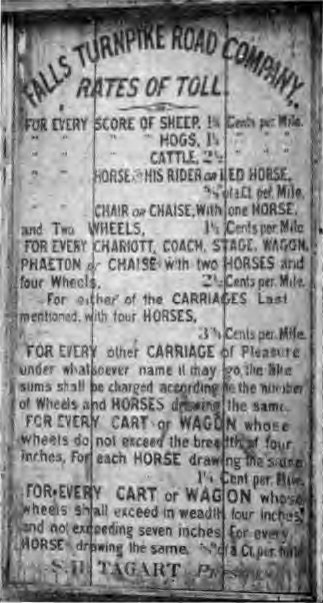
Signboard showing toll rates

According to Richard Caton, whose limekiln was located near the north end of the turnpike, and who was one of the officers of the company, the turnpike was "excepted to unite the trade of the North with Baltimore...in a direct line to Hanover and Carlisle." This extension was delayed by what Caton thought was a desire to keep the Baltimore and Reister's-town Turnpike's monopoly. A public road extending from Brooklandville north-northwesterly to George Kerlinger's Mill on Gunpowder Falls - near but not on the Pennsylvania state line - was authorized by a state law passed December 24, 1808. The Falls Turnpike began building the road, but lacked funds to complete it, and another law passed January 15, 1817 allowed the company to increase their capitalization and to charge tolls for travel on the extension. On March 12, 1828, the General Assembly ordered the company to, within six months, return this extension to the county for use as a free public road, and the turnpike was thus cut back to Brooklandville.

The turnpike began at the intersection of Cathedral Street and Howard Street (now the diagonal portion of Chase Street, intersecting Cathedral Street about half a block south of Biddle Street). It proceeded north on Cathedral Street, crossing Jones Falls a bit north of North Avenue to the current Falls Road. After North Avenue was built, the turnpike was separated from Cathedral Avenue, ending at North Avenue east of Jones Falls.

The description of allowed rates of toll given in the legislative charter are lengthy, and specify that, for instance, a horse and rider shall be charged 6.25 cents, and a two-horse stagecoach 25 cents, for the entire distance, and a smaller amount in proportion to the distance traveled. Five miles were completed by 1811, allowing the company to erect a toll gate; a second gate had been placed by 1819. Due to the impossibility of determining how far a customer had traveled, the Baltimore County Court allowed the company to charge a full toll for passing over any part of the road. The southern toll gate was located one to two blocks north of North Avenue at the bridge over Jones Falls, and the other was several miles north, near Cross Keys.

=== State highway ===
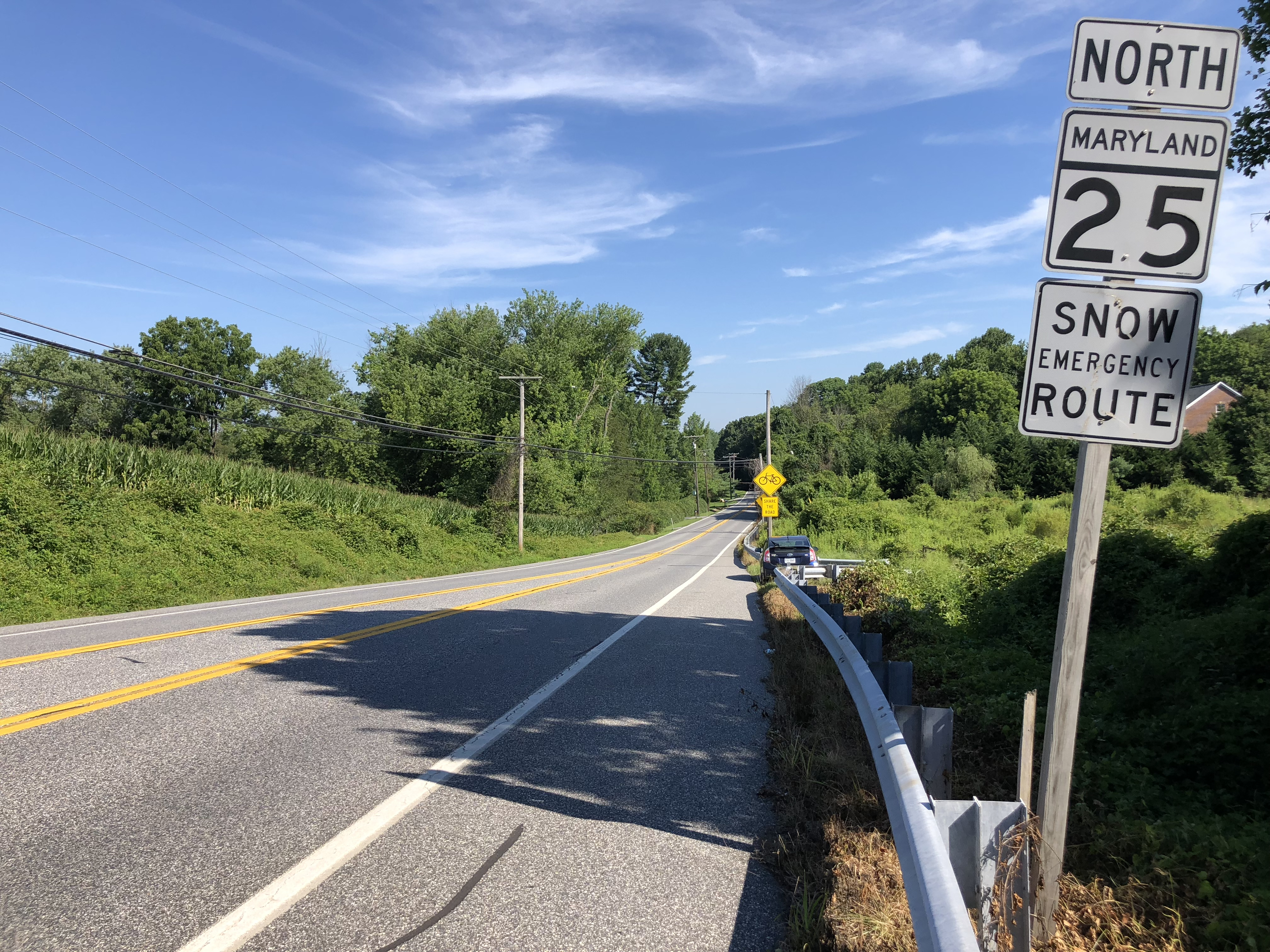
MD 25 northbound past Broadway Road/Padonia Road in Baltimore County

Falls Road was paved in macadam as a state-aid road—the road was designed by the Highway Division of the Maryland Geological Survey and paved by the county with equal financial support by the state and county—from Kelly Avenue in Mount Washington to Padonia Road by 1910. The highway was paved as a 40-foot (12 m)-wide vitrified brick state road—the road was designed by the Maryland State Roads Commission and its construction fully financed by the state—from 36th Avenue in Hampden north to the contemporary city limits at Roland Heights Avenue in Medfield in 1911. Falls Road from Roland Heights Avenue north to Kelly Avenue in Mount Washington was paved with a 40-foot (12 m)-wide vitrified brick surface in 1912.

By 1921, Falls Road had been surfaced in macadam from Padonia Road to Ridge Road south of Shawan and then in concrete the remaining distance to Shawan. That same year, the Maryland State Roads Commission planned to reconstruct Falls Road in Baltimore from 36th Street south to North Avenue; that stretch was paved with concrete by 1923. The portion of Falls Road from Butler to Whitehouse, which was then known as Blackrock, was planned as part of an extension of Park Heights Avenue via Butler Road and other highways east of Reisterstown as early as 1910 and as late as 1921. Starting in 1924, Falls Road was paved with concrete north from Shawan. The improved road reached a spot north of Butler by 1927 and to Whitehouse in 1928. The concrete highway was extended to Gunpowder Road in 1930 and to its present terminus at Beckleysville Road by 1933.

MD 25 was one of the original state-numbered highway designation assigned by the Maryland State Roads Commission in 1927. By 1930, the Baltimore–Shawan portion of the highway had been widened to a minimum width of 20 feet (6.1 m). Shortly after 1930, work began on a bridge over the Northern Central Railroad, whose right-of-way is now followed by the Baltimore Light RailLink, at Bare Hills; this structure was completed by 1934. MD 25's southern terminus was Charles Street by 1934 and MD 2 by 1956. The state highway's only major relocation was in 1962 and 1963 when the northern stub of the Jones Falls Expressway, now MD 25A, and the associated four-lane divided section of MD 25 in Brooklandville were constructed. With the completion of the Jones Falls Expressway, I-83 became the main highway from the north into downtown Baltimore and MD 25 was relegated to a local thoroughfare. MD 25 was closed for several months for the replacement of the highway's bridges over the Baltimore Light RailLink and Jones Falls at Bare Hills in 1991 and over I-695 near Brooklandville in 1996.

== Junction list ==
County	Location	mi	km	Destinations	Notes
Baltimore City		0.00	0.00	MD 2 north (Calvert Street)	Southern terminus
Baltimore City		0.06	0.097	MD 2 south (St. Paul Street)	
Baltimore City		0.15	0.24	Charles Street	Charles Street is one-way northbound
Baltimore City		1.79	2.88	I-83 south (Jones Falls Expressway)	I-83 exit 8; southbound exit and northbound entrance
Baltimore City		3.01	4.84	Cold Spring Lane	
Baltimore City		4.30	6.92	Northern Parkway	
Baltimore		7.34	11.81	MD 133 west (Old Court Road) / Ruxton Road to I-83 south – Pikesville	Eastern terminus of MD 133
Baltimore	Brooklandville	8.67	13.95	To I-83 / I-695 – Towson, Pikesville, Baltimore, York	Access via MD 25A
Baltimore	Brooklandville	8.82	14.19	MD 130 west (Greenspring Valley Road) – Reisterstown	Eastern terminus of MD 130
Baltimore	Brooklandville	9.22	14.84	MD 131 east (Seminary Avenue) – Lutherville	Western terminus of MD 131
Baltimore	Butler	17.85	28.73	MD 128 west (Butler Road) – Reisterstown	Eastern terminus of MD 128
Baltimore	Butler	19.05	30.66	MD 88 west (Black Rock Road) – Hampstead	Eastern terminus of MD 88
Baltimore		23.30	37.50	MD 137 (Mount Carmel Road) – Hereford, Hampstead	
Baltimore		26.89	43.28	Beckleysville Road / Falls Road north – Alesia	Northern terminus
1.000 mi = 1.609 km; 1.000 km = 0.621 mi: Incomplete access

== Auxiliary route ==
MD 25A is the designation for the 0.58-mile (0.93 km) portion of the Jones Falls Expressway north of the Baltimore Beltway in Brooklandville. The highway begins at the interchange between the Jones Falls Expressway and the Baltimore Beltway, which is a cloverleaf interchange with a flyover ramp for the transfer of southbound I-83 from the east–west beltway to the north–south expressway. The Jones Falls Expressway continues south as I-83 into Baltimore. The Baltimore Beltway carries I-695 west toward Pikesville and both I-83 and I-695 east toward Towson, where I-83 splits north toward York. The four-lane freeway ends at a four-leg intersection with MD 25 (Falls Road) and Joppa Road. Joppa Road heads east toward Towson; MD 25 heads south as a two-lane road from the west leg of the intersection and north as a short four-lane divided highway continuation of the expressway. The only intermediate junction on MD 25A is a direct ramp from MD 25 to southbound MD 25A at the southern point of where the two highways run parallel. All of MD 25A is a part of the National Highway System as a principal arterial for its entire length.
