= Maryland Route 128 =

State highway in Maryland, US known as Butler Rd

Maryland Route 128
- Butler Road
- Maryland Route 128 highlighted in red

Route information
- Maintained by MDSHA
- Length: 7.62 mi (12.26 km)
- Existed: 1930–present
- Tourist routes: Horses and Hounds Scenic Byway

Major junctions
- West end: MD 30 in Reisterstown
- East end: MD 25 in Butler

Location
- Country: United States
- State: Maryland
- Counties: Baltimore

Highway system
- Maryland highway system; Interstate; US; State; Scenic Byways
← MD 125	→ MD 129

Maryland Route 128 (MD 128) is a state highway located in Baltimore County in the U.S. state of Maryland. Known as Butler Road, the state highway runs 7.62 miles (12.26 km) from MD 30 in Reisterstown east to MD 25 at Butler. MD 128 was constructed in the early 1930s east of Glyndon. The state highway was extended west to MD 30 in the late 1940s concurrent with the removal of the parallel MD 127 in Reisterstown. An intermediate section of MD 128 was maintained by Baltimore County and MD 127 temporarily returned to its old route between 1970 and 1987.

== Route description ==
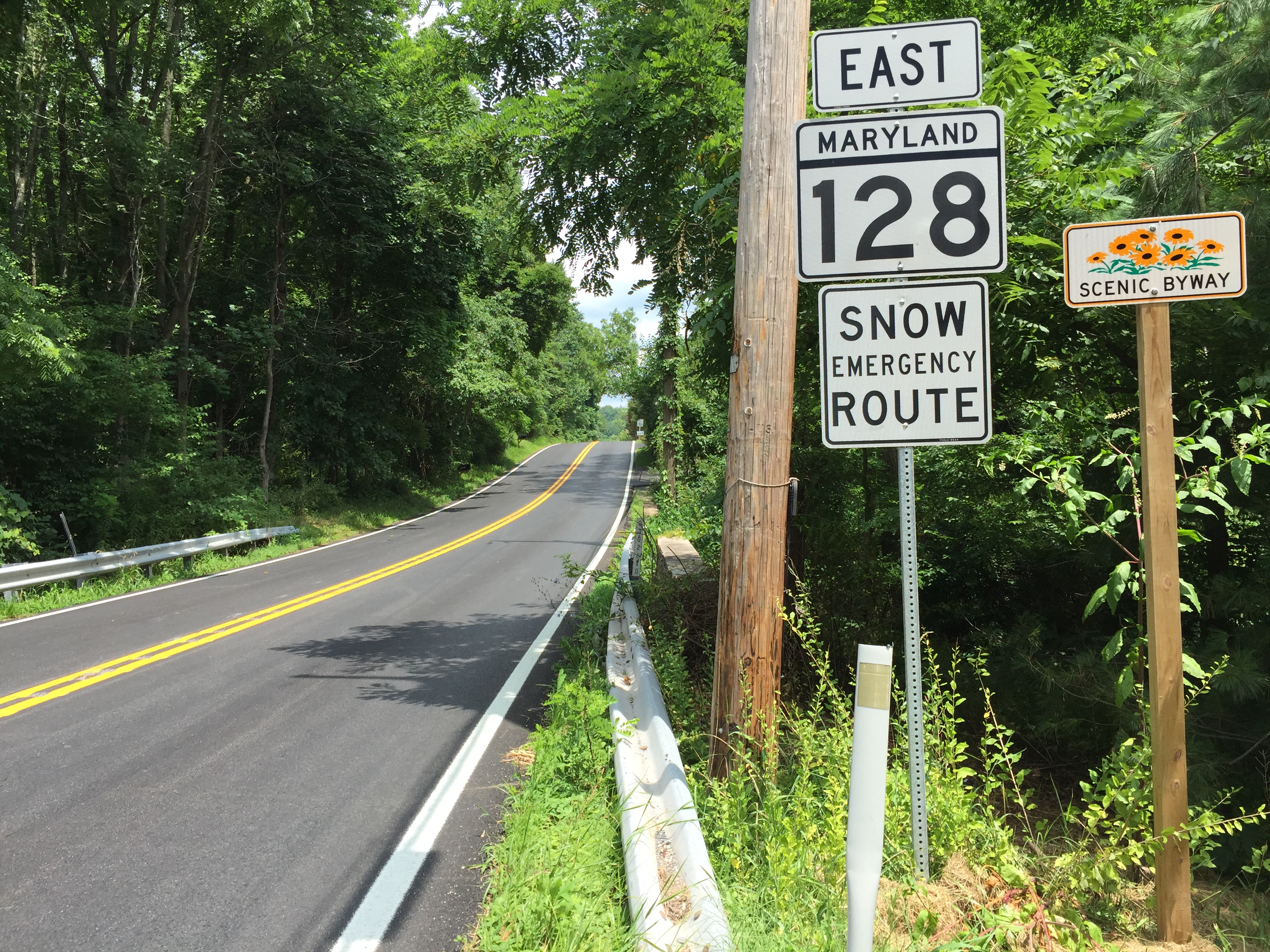
View east along MD 128 at Worthington Avenue in Glyndon

MD 128 begins at a four-way intersection with MD 30 (Hanover Pike) in Reisterstown. The west leg of the intersection is unsigned MD 795, a connector between the intersection and the northern end of Interstate 795 (I-795) at MD 140 that allows Baltimore–Hampstead traffic to bypass the center of Reisterstown. MD 128 heads east as a two-lane undivided road through the community of Glyndon, where the highway crosses over CSX's Hanover Subdivision railroad line, passes through the Glyndon Historic District, and meets the northern end of Central Avenue, a northern extension of Owings Mills Boulevard. The surroundings become rural shortly before the highway's three-way intersection with Worthington Road; here, MD 128 turns north to remain on Butler Road while Worthington Road heads east through the Worthington Valley Historic District. MD 128 continues northeast through horse country, passing to the northwest of Sagamore Farm. The state highway crosses Slade Run, McGill Run, and Piney Run and intersects Dover Road before reaching its eastern terminus at MD 25 (Falls Road) at the hamlet of Butler.

MD 128 is a part of the National Highway System as a principal arterial from MD 30 in Reisterstown to east of Central Avenue in Glyndon.

== History ==
MD 128 was paved as a concrete road from Worthington Road to Dover Road in 1930 and from there to MD 25 by 1933. The remainder of the route between Worthington Road and Reisterstown included county-maintained Butler Road west to Glyndon and MD 127, which followed Chatsworth Avenue from U.S. Route 140 (now MD 140) in Reisterstown east to the Western Maryland Railway tracks (now CSX's Hanover Subdivision) in Glyndon. In 1948 and 1949, MD 128 was extended west over Butler Road and a new bridge over the railroad to its present western terminus. MD 127 was transferred to county maintenance at the same time. In 1970, MD 127 returned to Chatsworth Avenue and the 1-mile (1.6 km) section of MD 128 north of the Worthington Road intersection became maintained by Baltimore County. The two disjoint segments of MD 128 were united when that segment returned to state control in 1987; MD 127 was again removed from Chatsworth Avenue. That same year, I-795 was completed north to MD 140 and the MD 795 connector was built between the I-795 – MD 140 interchange and the MD 30 – MD 128 intersection, resulting in a slight relocation of MD 128's western terminus.

== Junction list ==
The entire route is in Baltimore County.

Location	mi	km	Destinations	Notes
Reisterstown	0.00	0.00	MD 30 (Hanover Pike) to I-795 – Baltimore, Westminster, Reisterstown, Hanover	Western terminus; connector to I-795 is unsigned MD 795
Butler	7.62	12.26	MD 25 (Falls Road) – Baltimore	Eastern terminus
1.000 mi = 1.609 km; 1.000 km = 0.621 mi
