= Maryland Route 131 =

State highway in Baltimore County, Maryland, known as Seminary Ave

Maryland Route 131
- Seminary Avenue
- Maryland Route 131 highlighted in red

Route information
- Maintained by MDSHA
- Length: 3.06 mi (4.92 km)
- Existed: 1927–present

Major junctions
- West end: MD 25 in Brooklandville
- East end: MD 45 in Lutherville

Location
- Country: United States
- State: Maryland
- Counties: Baltimore

Highway system
- Maryland highway system; Interstate; US; State; Scenic Byways
← MD 130	→ MD 132

Maryland Route 131 (MD 131) is a state highway located in Baltimore County in the U.S. state of Maryland. Known as Seminary Avenue, the state highway runs 3.06 miles (4.92 km) from MD 25 in Brooklandville east to MD 45 in Lutherville. MD 131 was mostly constructed by 1910, with the remainder completed in the early 1920s.

== Route description ==
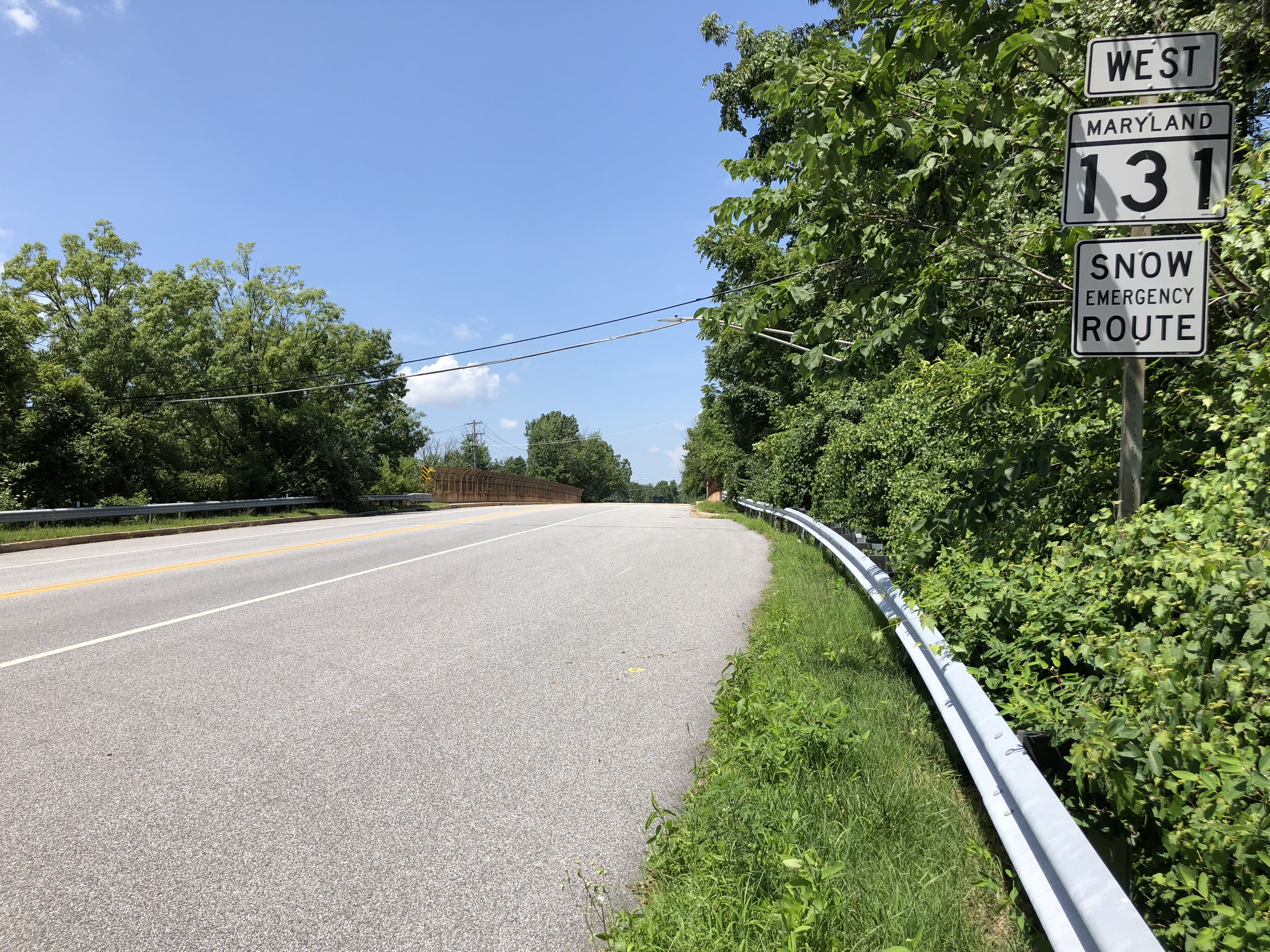
View west along MD 131 at I-83 in Lutherville

MD 131 begins at a four-way intersection with MD 25 (Falls Road) in Brooklandville. The west leg of the intersection is the entrance to St. Paul's School. MD 131 heads east as a two-lane undivided road through the southern end of the suburban community of Mays Chapel. The state highway passes over Interstate 83 (I-83, Harrisburg Expressway) with no access and enters Lutherville, where the road crosses MTA Maryland's Baltimore Light RailLink at-grade. MD 131 continues through the Lutherville Historic District and intersects Bellona Road before reaching its eastern terminus at MD 45 (York Road). Seminary Avenue continues east as a county highway that intersects MD 146 (Dulaney Valley Road) and passes through Hampton before ending at Providence Road.

== History ==
Seminary Avenue was paved from Brooklandville east to the rail crossing—then part of the Northern Central Railway—by 1910. The remainder of the highway was paved by 1923. The bridge that carries Seminary Avenue over I-83 has a bronze dedication plaque for the highway construction project. Aside from that construction around 1954, there has been very little change to MD 131 since then.

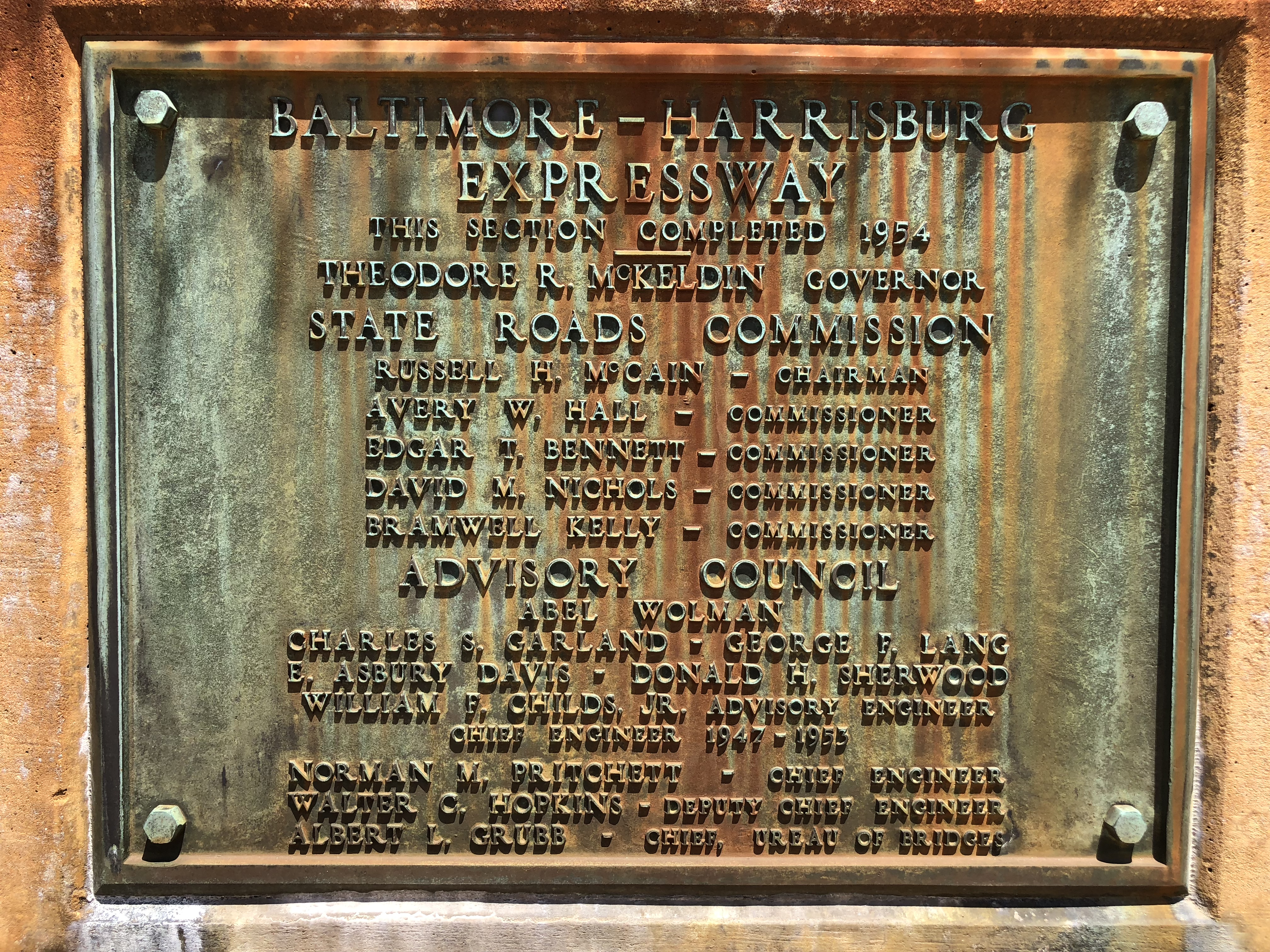
Baltimore-Harrisburg Expressway (I-83) dedication plaque

== Junction list ==
The entire route is in Baltimore County.

Location	mi	km	Destinations	Notes
Brooklandville	0.00	0.00	MD 25 (Falls Road) – Baltimore, Butler	Western terminus
Lutherville	3.06	4.92	MD 45 (York Road) / Seminary Avenue east – Towson, Timonium	Eastern terminus
1.000 mi = 1.609 km; 1.000 km = 0.621 mi
