= Maryland Route 137 =

State highway in Maryland, US known as Mount Carmel Rd

Maryland Route 137
- Mount Carmel Road
- MD 137 highlighted in red

Route information
- Maintained by MDSHA
- Length: 8.50 mi (13.68 km)
- Existed: 1927–present
- Tourist routes: Horses and Hounds Scenic Byway

Major junctions
- West end: Gunpowder Road near Hampstead
- MD 25 near Hampstead; I-83 near Hereford
- East end: MD 45 at Hereford

Location
- Country: United States
- State: Maryland
- Counties: Baltimore

Highway system
- Maryland highway system; Interstate; US; State; Scenic Byways
← MD 136	→ MD 138

Maryland Route 137 (MD 137) is a state highway in the U.S. state of Maryland. Known as Mount Carmel Road, the state highway runs 8.50 miles (13.68 km) from Gunpowder Road near Hampstead east to MD 45 at Hereford in northern Baltimore County. MD 137 was built in the early 1920s.

== Route description ==
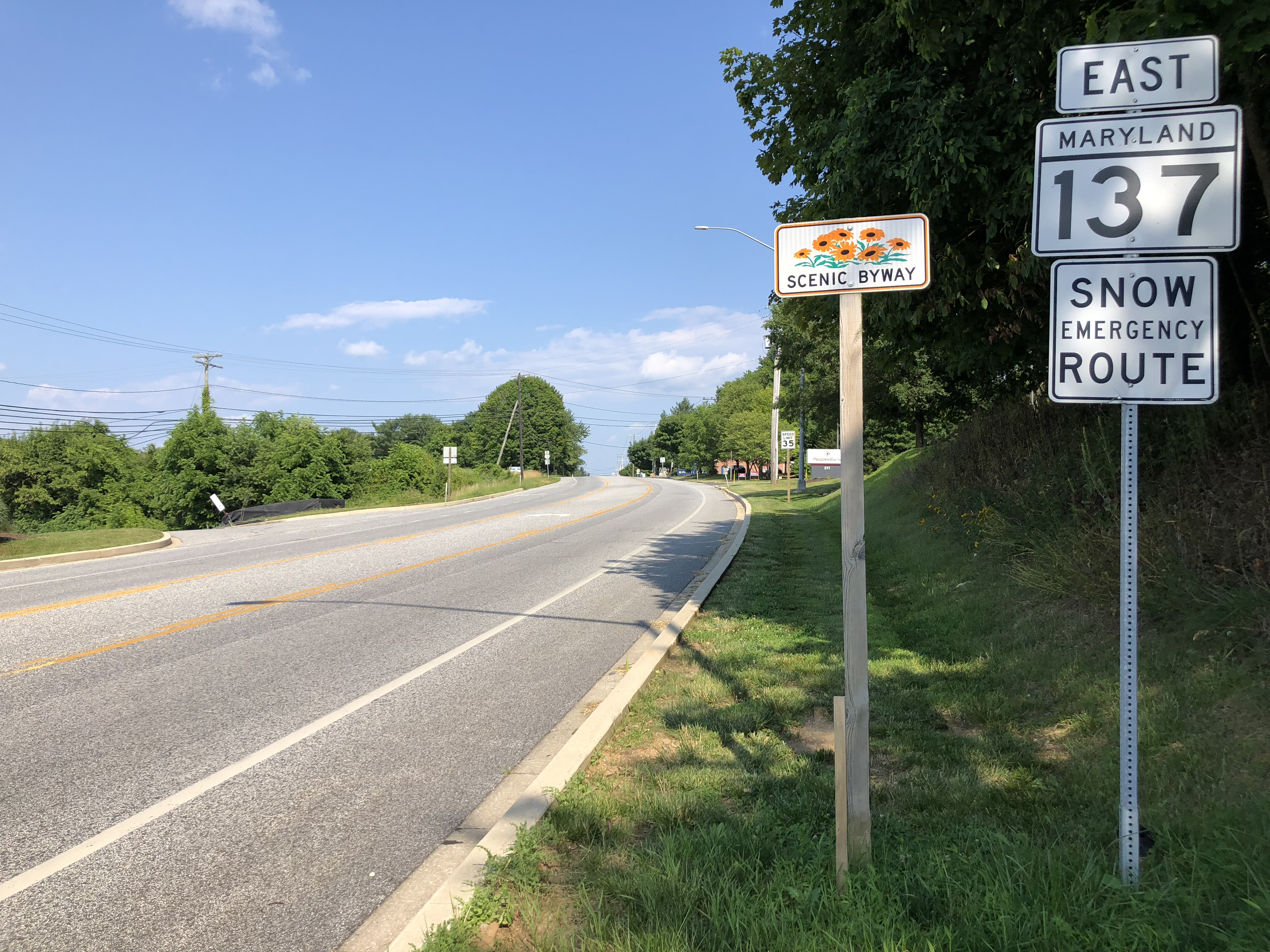
View east along MD 137 at I-83 in Hereford

MD 137 begins at a three-way intersection with Gunpowder Road, which heads east toward Prettyboy Reservoir, and a county-maintained continuation of Mount Carmel Road west toward Hampstead. Mount Carmel Road becomes Lower Beckleysville Road on entering Carroll County and intersects MD 88 (Black Rock Road). MD 137 heads south as a two-lane undivided road and curves east and intersects MD 25 (Falls Road). The state highway continues east through farmland along the drainage divide between Gunpowder Falls to the north and its tributary Western Run to the south and passes its namesake church, now named Mount Carmel United Methodist Church. MD 137 meets Interstate 83 (I-83, Harrisburg Expressway) at a diamond interchange with ramps staggered into four intersections. A park and ride lot is located within the northwest quadrant of this interchange. Opposite the easternmost ramp, which is from northbound I-83 to MD 137, is unsigned MD 889, the access road to the Maryland State Highway Administration's Hereford Shop. East of I-83, MD 137 reaches its eastern terminus at a three-way intersection with MD 45 (York Road) 0.10-mile (0.16 km) north of the western terminus of MD 138 (Monkton Road).

== History ==
MD 137 was paved as a concrete road from its western terminus to Falls Road and from near the Mount Carmel church to York Road by 1921. The intervening segment between Falls Road and the church was completed in 1923. Outside of the construction of its interchange with I-83 between 1954 and 1956, MD 137 has changed very little since it was built.

== Junction list ==
The entire route is in Baltimore County.

Location	mi	km	Destinations	Notes
	0.00	0.00	Gunpowder Road east / Mount Carmel Road west – Hampstead	Western terminus
	1.87	3.01	MD 25 (Falls Road) – Baltimore	
Hereford	7.94	12.78	I-83 (Harrisburg Expressway) – Baltimore, York	I-83 Exit 27
Hereford	8.50	13.68	MD 45 (York Road) – Parkton, Monkton	Eastern terminus
1.000 mi = 1.609 km; 1.000 km = 0.621 mi
