= Maryland Route 88 =

State highway in Maryland, US

Maryland Route 88
- Maryland Route 88 highlighted in red

Route information
- Maintained by MDSHA
- Length: 8.01 mi (12.89 km)
- Existed: 1927–present
- Tourist routes: Horses and Hounds Scenic Byway

Major junctions
- West end: MD 30 Bus. in Hampstead
- MD 833 in Hampstead
- East end: MD 25 near Butler

Location
- Country: United States
- State: Maryland
- Counties: Carroll, Baltimore

Highway system
- Maryland highway system; Interstate; US; State; Scenic Byways
← MD 86	→ MD 90

Maryland Route 88 (MD 88) is a state highway in the U.S. state of Maryland. Known for most of its length as Black Rock Road, the state highway runs 8.01 miles (12.89 km) from MD 30 Business in Hampstead east to MD 25 near Butler. MD 88 was constructed around the Carroll–Baltimore county line in the early 1910s. The remainder of the highway to MD 25 was completed in the late 1920s and early 1930s. MD 88 was relocated in Hampstead in the mid-1960s; the old route became MD 833.

== Route description ==
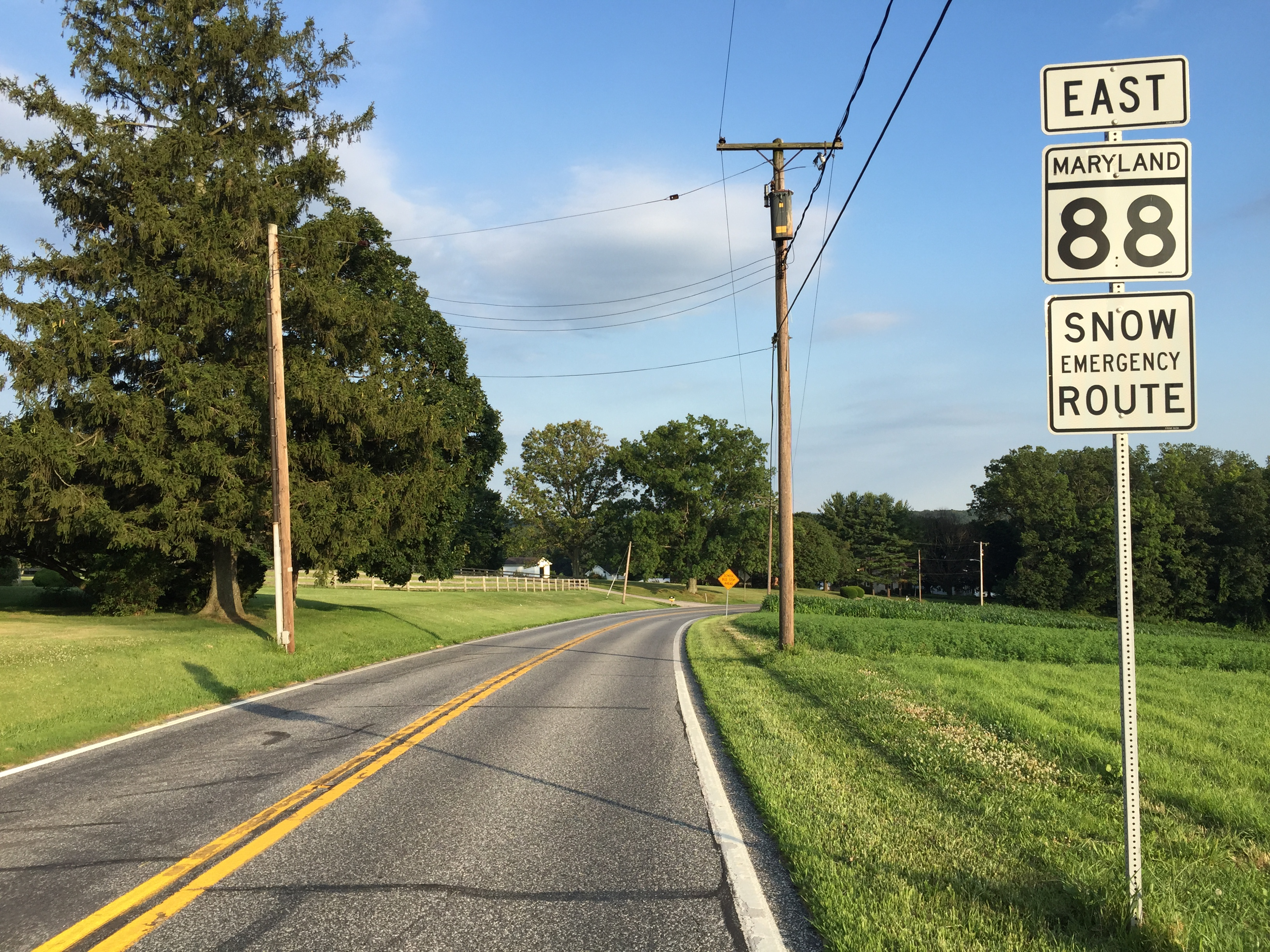
View east along MD 88 in western Baltimore County

MD 88 begins at an intersection with MD 30 Business (Main Street) in the town of Hampstead in Carroll County. The state highway heads east as two-lane undivided Lower Beckleysville Road to a roundabout at the east town limit. Lower Beckleysville Road continues northeast as a county highway that becomes Mount Carmel Road in Baltimore County and leads to MD 137. The northwest leg of the roundabout is MD 833 (Old Blackrock Road), the old alignment of MD 88 that heads back toward the center of Hampstead. MD 88 continues southeast as Black Rock Road and enters Baltimore County. The state highway passes through farmland on top of a ridge until the highway curves east and descends into the valley of Indian Run. MD 88 crosses the stream just before reaching its eastern terminus at MD 25 (Falls Road) north of the village of Butler.

MD 88 is a part of the National Highway System as a principal arterial from MD 30 Business east to MD 833 in Hampstead.

== History ==
MD 88 was paved as a state-aid road in three sections by 1915. The first two sections, from Main Street in Hampstead east to the Baltimore–Carroll county line and from the county line to Trenton Road, were paved in macadam with widths of 14 feet (4.3 m) and 12 feet (3.7 m), respectively. The segment from Trenton Road to Mount Zion Road was built as a 12-foot (3.7 m) wide concrete road. The remainder of MD 88 from Mount Zion Road to Falls Road was built in two sections: from MD 25 west to Benson Mill Road in 1929 and from there to Mount Zion Road by 1933. The highway was relocated onto a western extension of Lower Beckleysville Road through Hampstead in 1966; MD 88's old route from MD 30 (Main Street) to Lower Beckleysville Road became MD 833. The roundabout at the intersection of MD 88 and MD 833 was constructed in 2003.

== Junction list ==
County	Location	mi	km	Destinations	Notes
Carroll	Hampstead	0.00	0.00	MD 30 Bus. (Main Street) – Reisterstown, Manchester	Western terminus
Carroll	Hampstead	0.68	1.09	MD 833 west (Old Blackrock Road) / Lower Beckleysville Road east	Roundabout; eastern terminus of MD 833
Baltimore	Butler	8.01	12.89	MD 25 (Falls Road) – Baltimore	Eastern terminus
1.000 mi = 1.609 km; 1.000 km = 0.621 mi
