= Stone Hill Historic District =

Historic district in Maryland, United States

- U.S. National Register of Historic Places
- U.S. Historic district
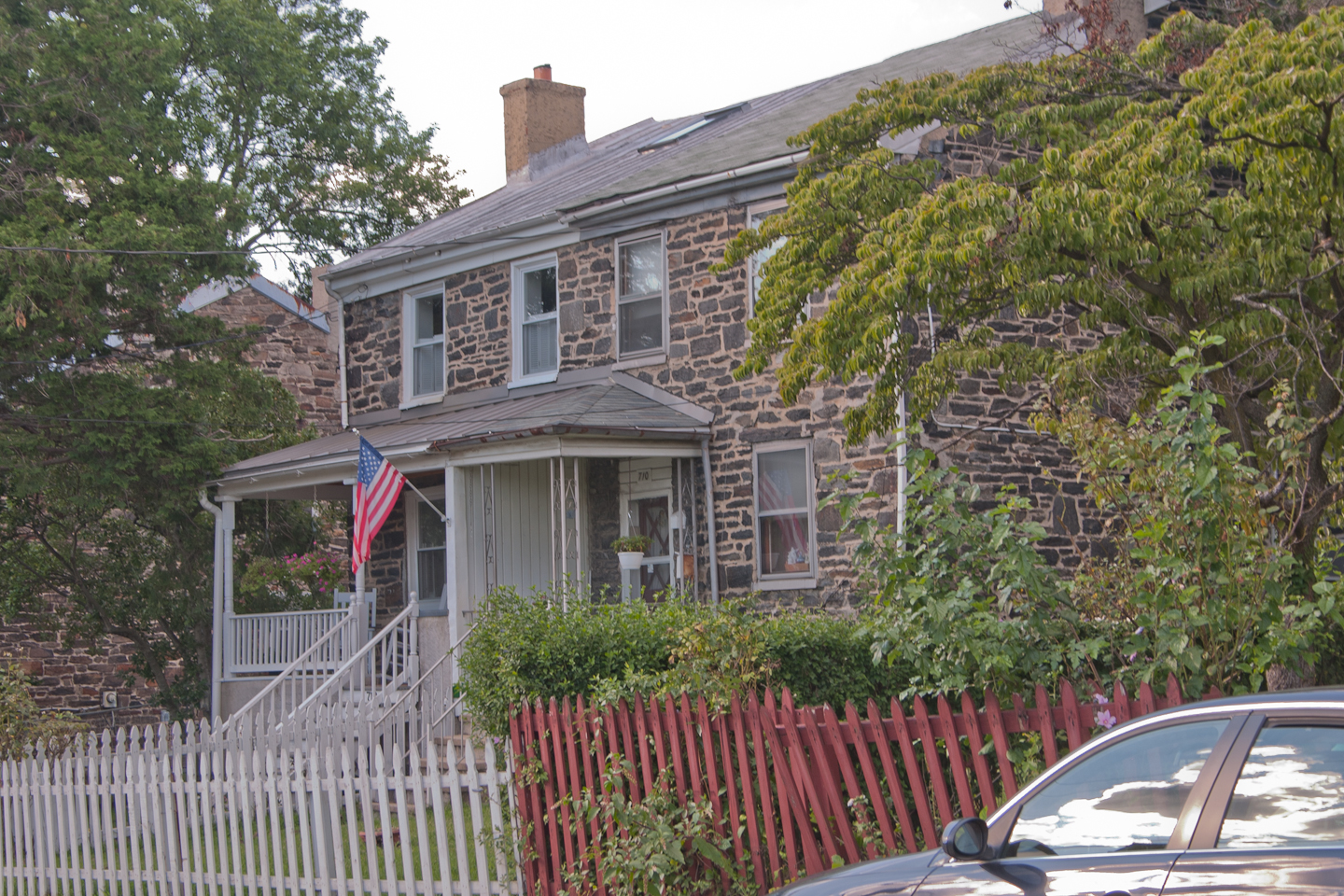
- Houses along Pacific Street, August 2011

- Location within Baltimore Location within Maryland Location within the United States
- Location: Pacific, Puritan, Bay, Field and Worth Sts., Baltimore, Maryland
- Coordinates: 39°19′24″N 76°37′46″W
- Area: 5 acres (2.0 ha)
- Built: 1845
- Architectural style: Mid 19th Century Revival, workers' housing
- NRHP reference No.: 01001370
- Added to NRHP: December 26, 2001

Stone Hill Historic District is a national historic district in Baltimore, Maryland, United States. It is one of the original mill villages along the Jones Falls, having been developed circa 1845–1847 to house textile mill workers. Comprising seven blocks, the district includes 21 granite duplexes, a granite Superintendent's House, and a granite service building (now converted to a duplex) – all owned by Mount Vernon Mills from 1845 to 1925.

It was added to the National Register of Historic Places in 2001.
