= Evergreen on the Falls =

Historic house in Maryland, United States

- U.S. National Register of Historic Places
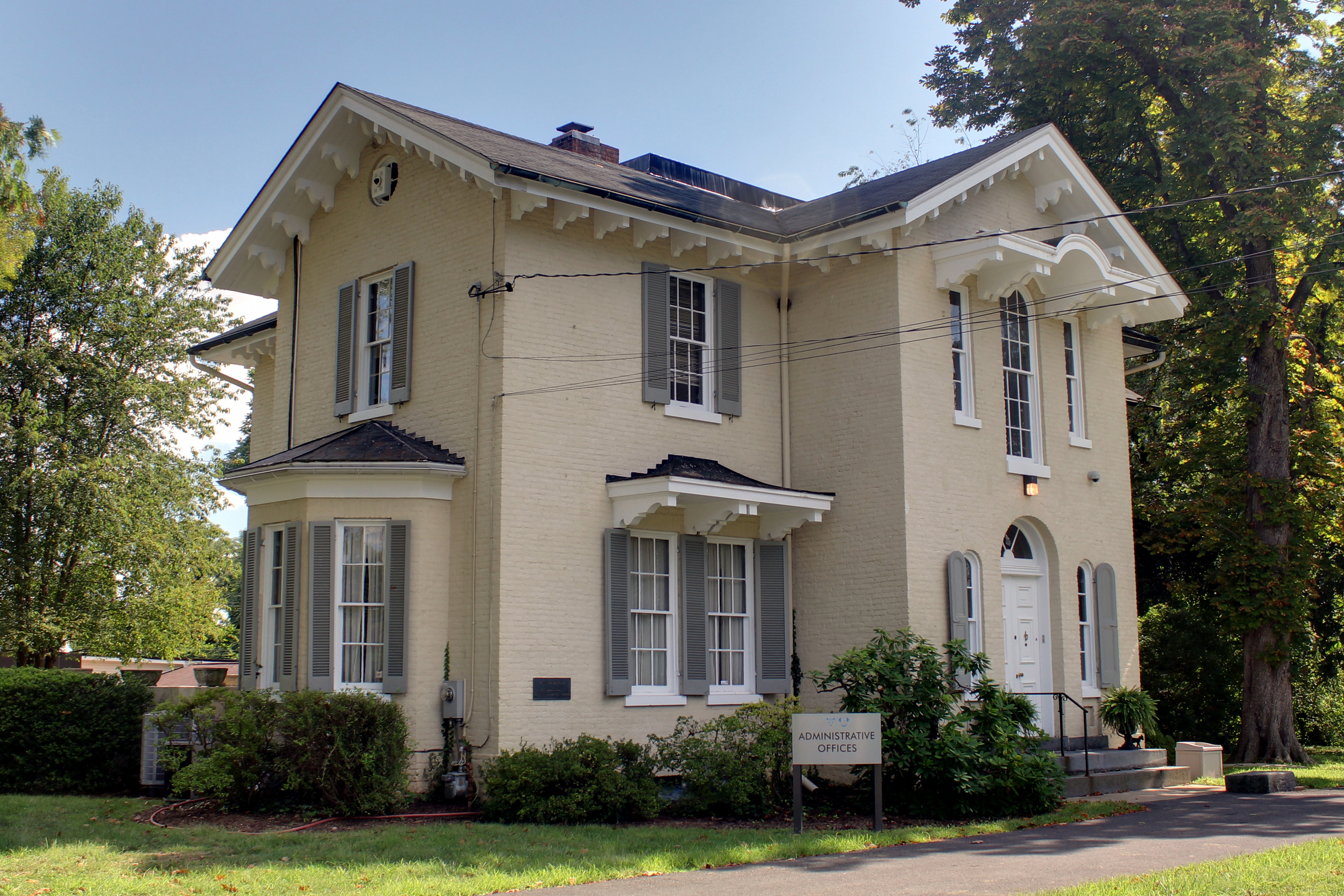
- Evergreen on the Falls, September 2012

- Location within Baltimore Location within Maryland Location within the United States
- Location: 3300 Falls Rd., Baltimore, Maryland
- Coordinates: 39°19′37″N 76°38′6″W
- Area: 9.7 acres (3.9 ha)
- Built: 1860
- Architectural style: Classical Revival, Italianate
- NRHP reference No.: 75002095
- Added to NRHP: July 30, 1975

Evergreen on the Falls, also known as the Snyder-Carroll House, is an historic 19th century home overlooking the Jones Falls valley and located at Baltimore, Maryland, United States. It is a 2 1/2-story, brick mansion in a rural version of the Victorian Italianate style. A serious fire in the early 1970s destroyed the furnishings and most of the interior. It was built about 1860 and was the home of the supervisor of the Mount Vernon Mills, Albert H. Carroll. It is headquarters of the Maryland Society for the Prevention of Cruelty to Animals.

Evergreen on the Falls was listed on the National Register of Historic Places in 1975.
