= Western Run–Belfast Road Historic District =

Historic district in Maryland, United States

- U.S. National Register of Historic Places
- U.S. Historic district
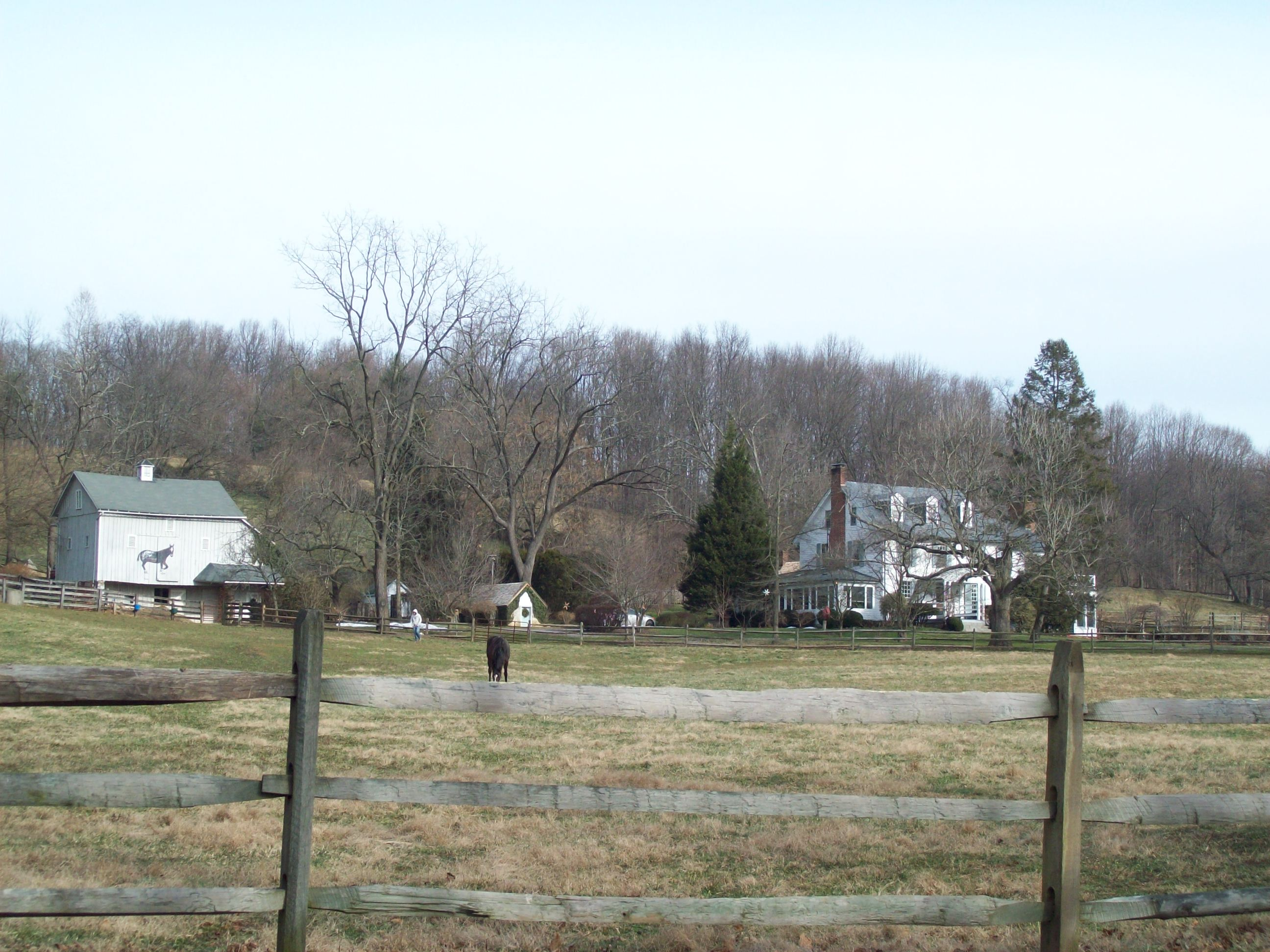
- Western Run–Belfast Road Historic District, December 2009

- Location within Maryland Location within the United States
- Location: NW of Lutherville, Lutherville, Maryland
- Coordinates: 39°31′45″N 76°41′39″W
- Area: 9,975 acres (4,037 ha)
- Architectural style: Colonial Revival, Georgian, Federal
- NRHP reference No.: 79001116
- Added to NRHP: January 23, 1979

Western Run–Belfast Road Historic District is a national historic district in Cockeysville, Baltimore County, Maryland, United States. It is a largely agricultural area and was first settled in the 18th century as a natural extension of the Worthington Valley Historic District. It includes the village of Butler forming a small commercial crossroads with its general store, post office, and community firehouse.

It was added to the National Register of Historic Places in 1979.
