= Hampstead School (Hampstead, Maryland) =

- U.S. National Register of Historic Places
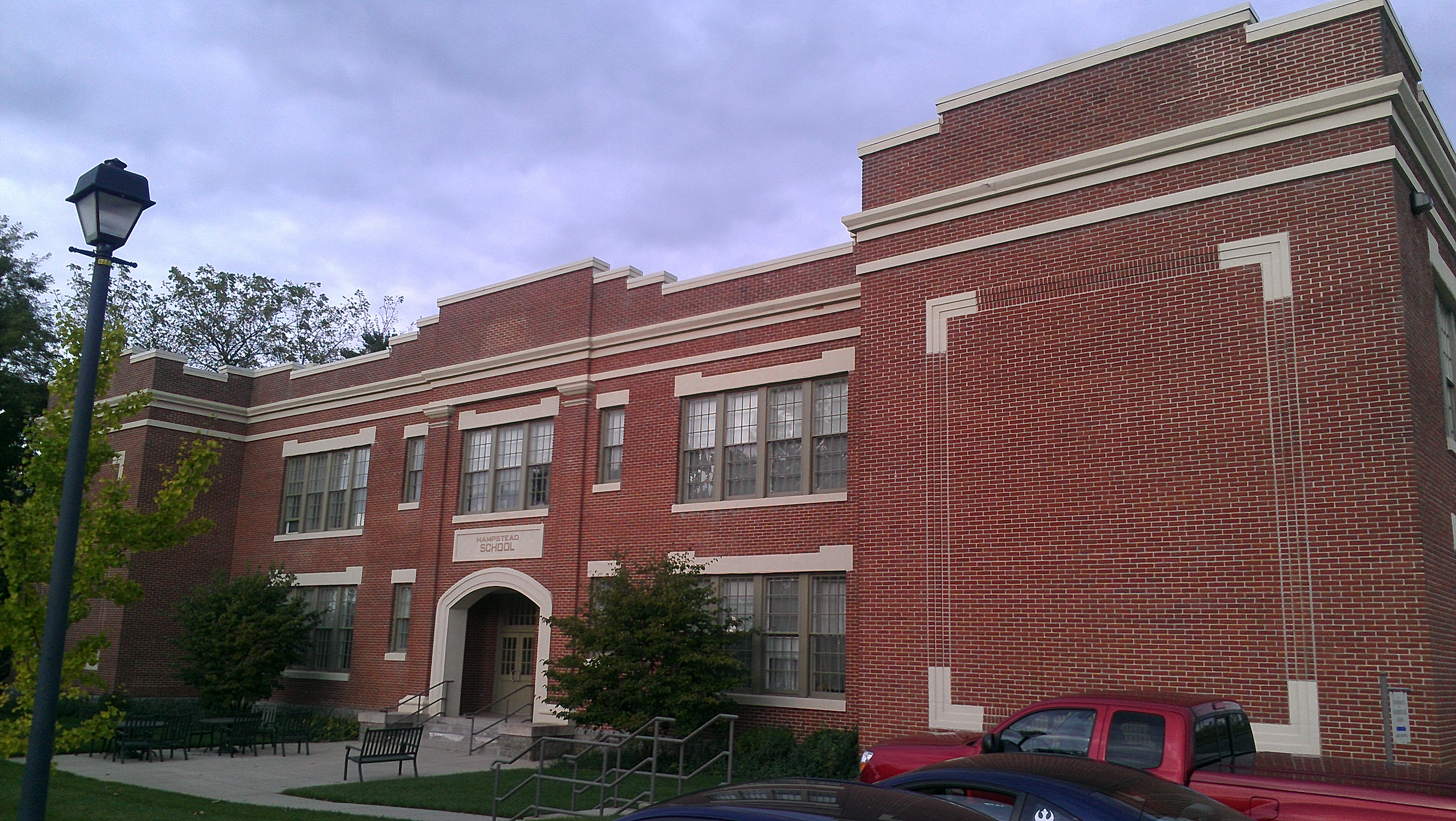

- Location within Maryland Location within the United States
- Location: 1211 N. Main St., Hampstead, Maryland
- Coordinates: 39°36′28″N 76°50′59″W
- Area: 5.4 acres (2.2 ha)
- Built: 1919
- Architect: Erb, N. Claud; Starr, E.B.
- Architectural style: Tudor Revival
- NRHP reference No.: 02001575
- Added to NRHP: December 27, 2002

Hampstead School is a historic school located at Hampstead, Carroll County, Maryland. It is a two-story brick building with Tudor Revival stylistic elements, constructed in 1919 and expanded in 1939. Hampstead School has a U shape, with the rectangular main block constructed in 1919 and an L-shaped rear addition constructed in 1939. It is a good example of centralized schools that Maryland's early-20th century school consolidation created. It housed students from first grade through high school until 1956. The property retains many of its outbuildings and is operated as an apartment building for adults 62 and over.

It was listed on the National Register of Historic Places in 2002.
