= Rockland (Brooklandville, Maryland) =

Historic house in Maryland, United States

- U.S. National Register of Historic Places
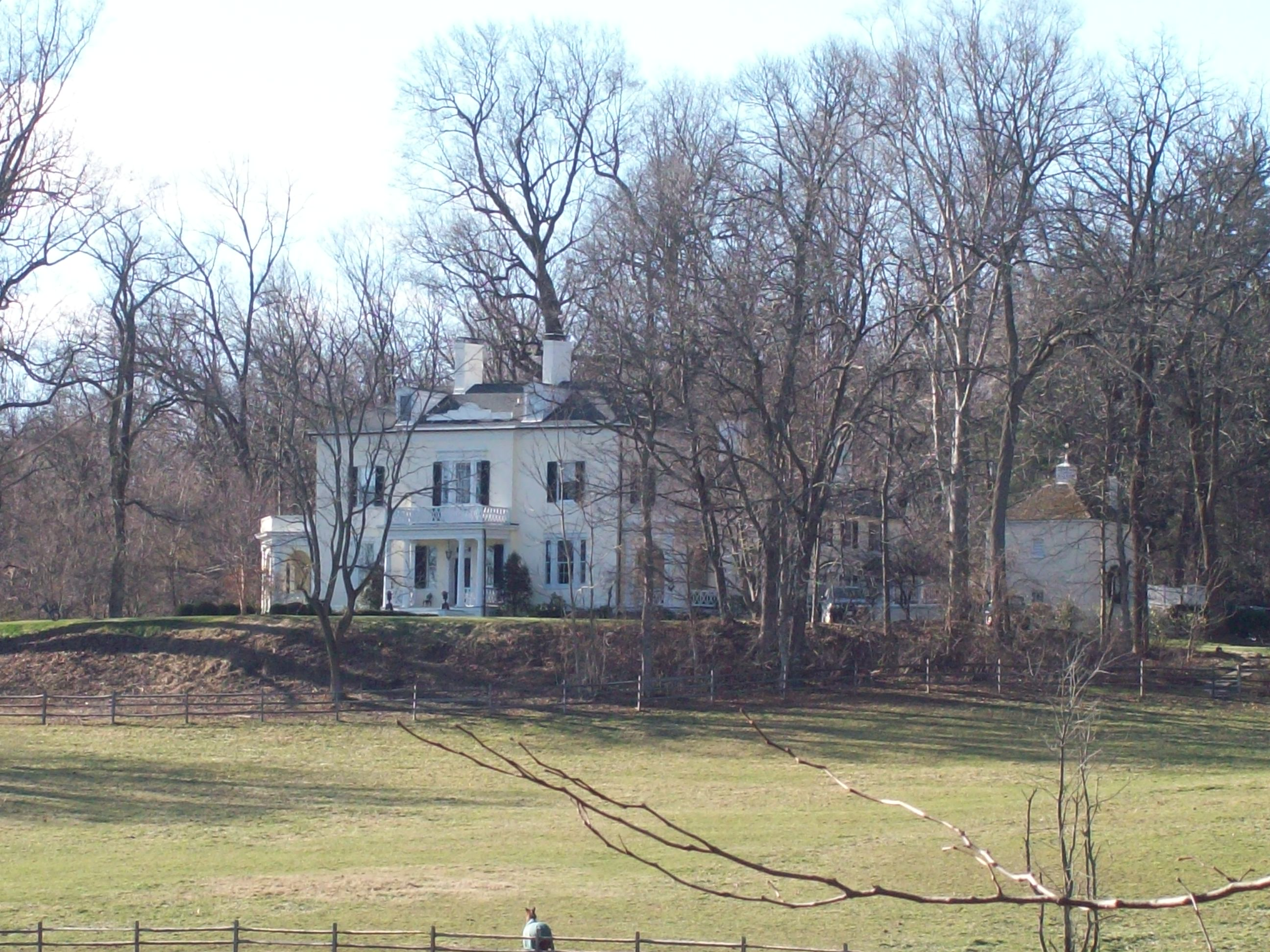
- Rockland, December 2009

- Location within Maryland Location within the United States
- Location: 10214 Falls Road; Brooklandville, Maryland
- Coordinates: 39°24′10.2″N 76°40′18.7″W
- Area: 30 acres (12 ha)
- Built: 1837
- Architect: David Carlisle
- Architectural style: Greek Revival
- NRHP reference No.: 83002944
- Added to NRHP: February 2, 1983

Rockland is a historic home located on Falls Road in Brooklandville, Baltimore County, Maryland. It is a 2 1/2-story Greek Revival-influenced house consisting of a three-bay-wide main block, constructed in 1837, with two telescoping additions, a two-bay-wide stage completed in 1852, and a three-bay-wide section built after 1890. The brick structure has been stuccoed and scored to resemble ashlar masonry. Also on the property are a smokehouse, bake oven, a large bank barn, and a late-19th-century frame shed.

It was listed on the National Register of Historic Places in 1983.

== Gallery ==
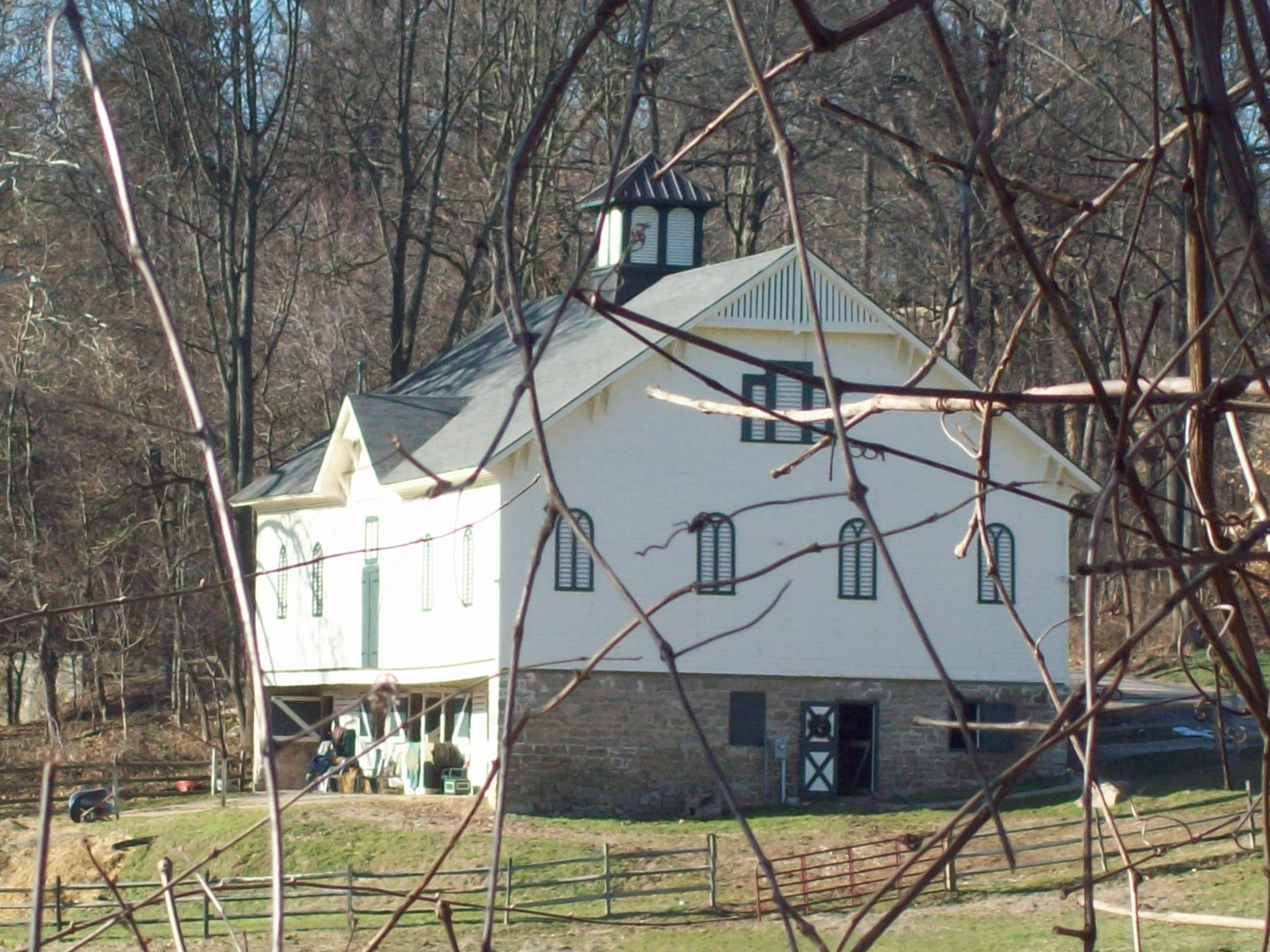
Rockland Bank Barn, December 2009
