= Worthington Valley Historic District =

Historic district in Maryland, United States

- U.S. National Register of Historic Places
- U.S. Historic district
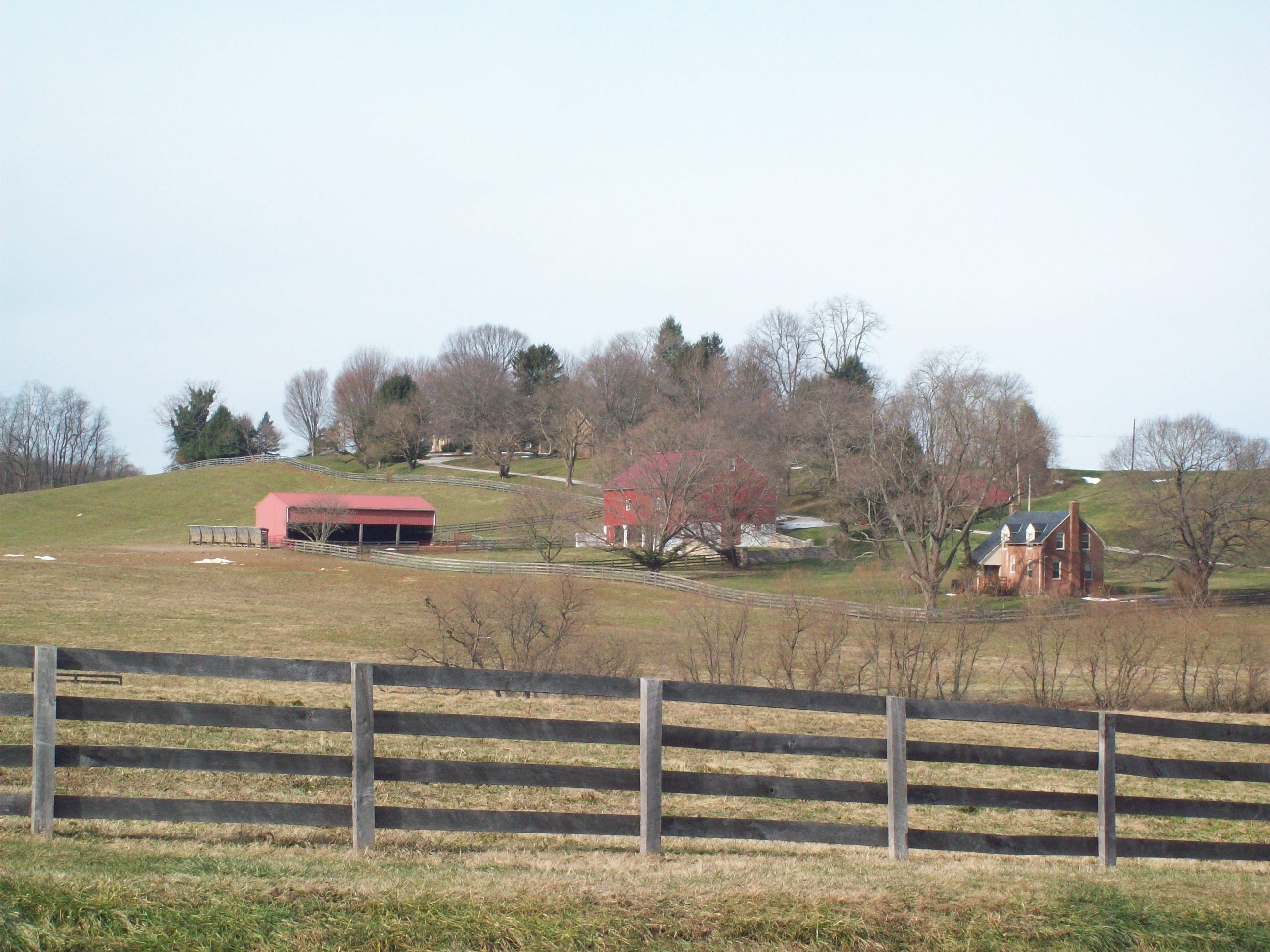
- Worthington Valley Historic District, December 2009

- Location within Maryland Location within the United States
- Nearest city: Glyndon, Maryland
- Coordinates: 39°29′59″N 76°45′19″W
- Area: 8,000 acres (3,200 ha)
- Built: 1795
- Architectural style: Classical Revival, Early Republic, Greek Revival
- NRHP reference No.: 76000977
- Added to NRHP: December 12, 1976

Worthington Valley Historic District is a national historic district in Reisterstown, Maryland, United States. It is a largely rural district where the earliest standing structures date from the very end of the 18th century. Horse breeding and racing is a very large and lucrative business in the valley. Since 1922, Snow Hill and Worthington Farms have been the scene of the Maryland Hunt Cup Steeplechase. Located next to it is the Western Run–Belfast Road Historic District.

It was added to the National Register of Historic Places in 1976.
