= Buildings at 1601–1830 St. Paul Street and 12–20 E. Lafayette Street =

Historic houses in Maryland, United States

- U.S. National Register of Historic Places
- U.S. Historic district
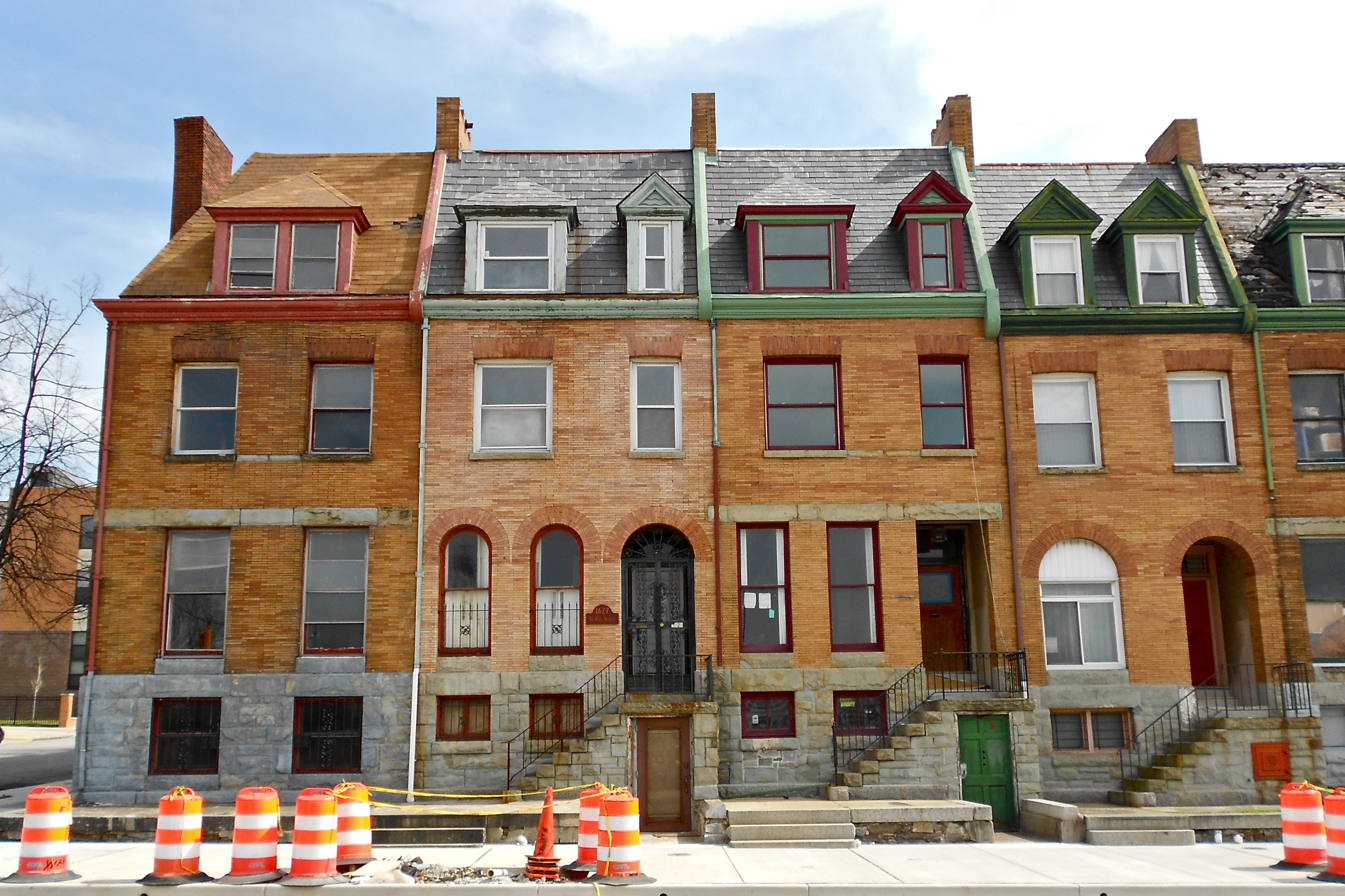

- Location within Baltimore Location within Maryland Location within the United States
- Location: 1601–1830 St. Paul St., and 12–20 E Lafayette St., Baltimore, Maryland
- Coordinates: 39°18′33″N 76°36′54″W
- Area: 4 acres (1.6 ha)
- Built: 1876
- NRHP reference No.: 84000502
- Added to NRHP: December 27, 1984

The buildings at 1601–1830 St. Paul Street and 12–20 E. Lafayette Street form a national historic district in Baltimore, Maryland, United States. They are a distinctive collection of 76 residential rowhouses in north central Baltimore, most of which were constructed between 1876 and 1906.

It was added to the National Register of Historic Places in 1984.

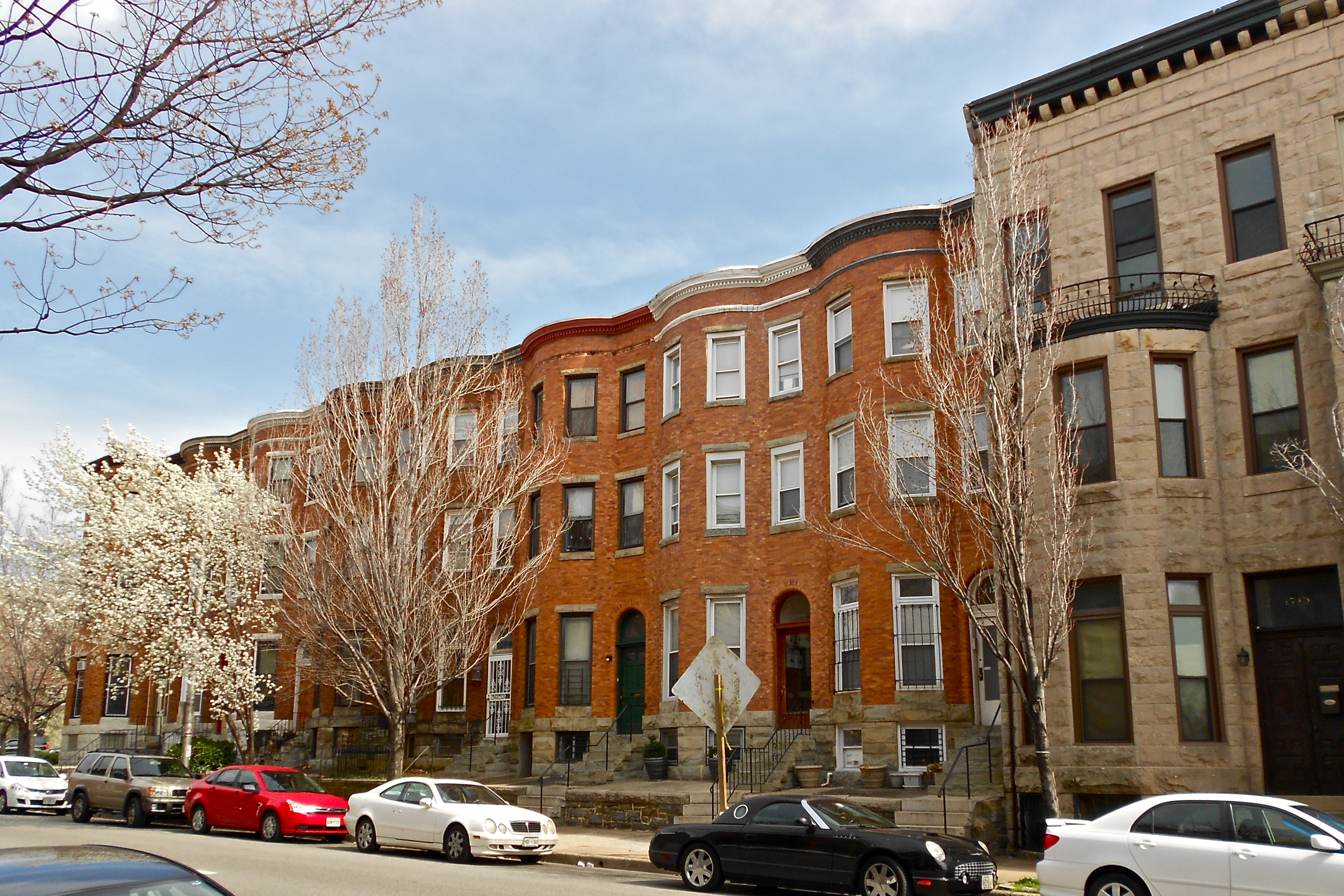
Rowhouses

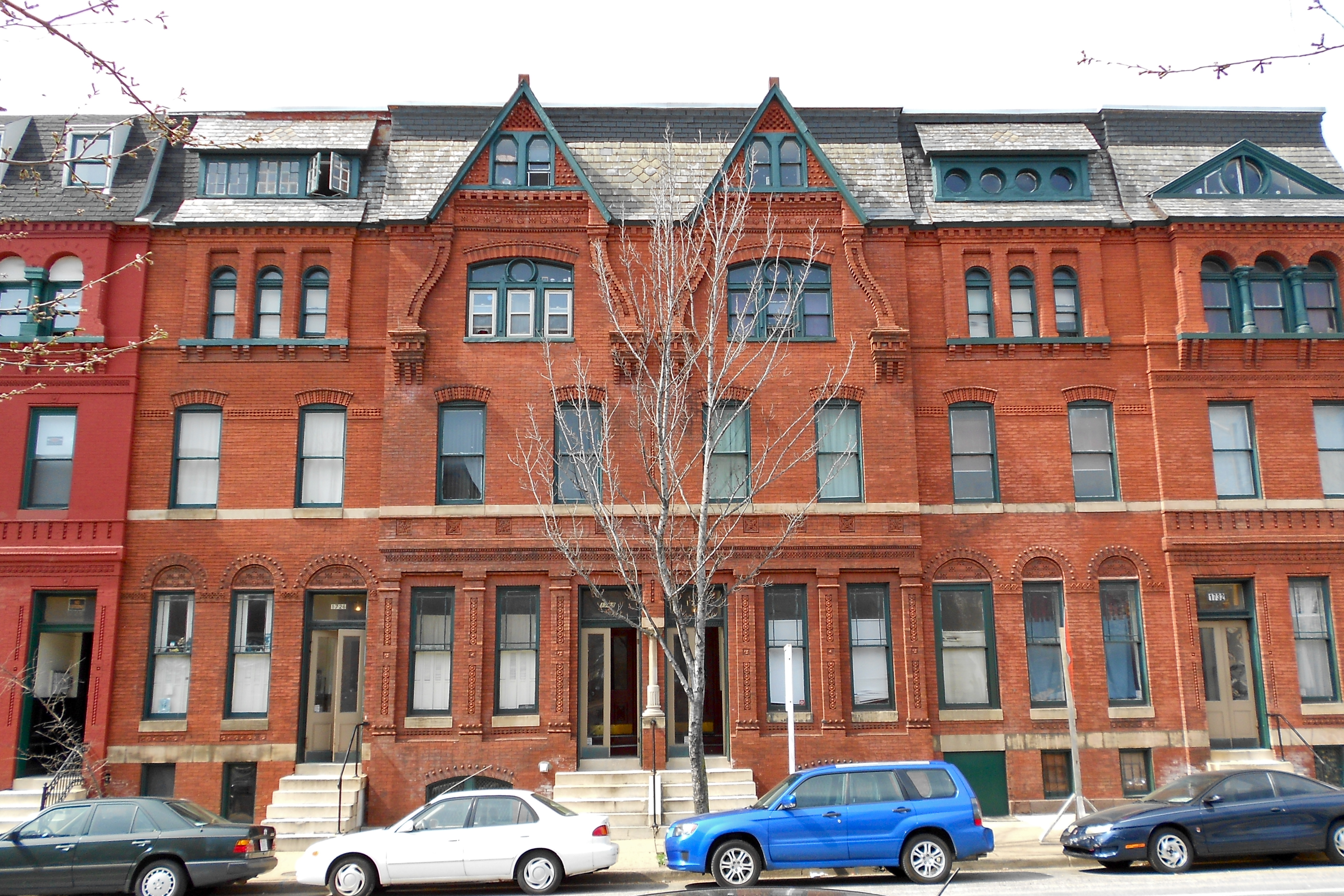
More rowhouses
