= Hereford, Maryland =

Unincorporated community in Maryland, United States

- Unincorporated community
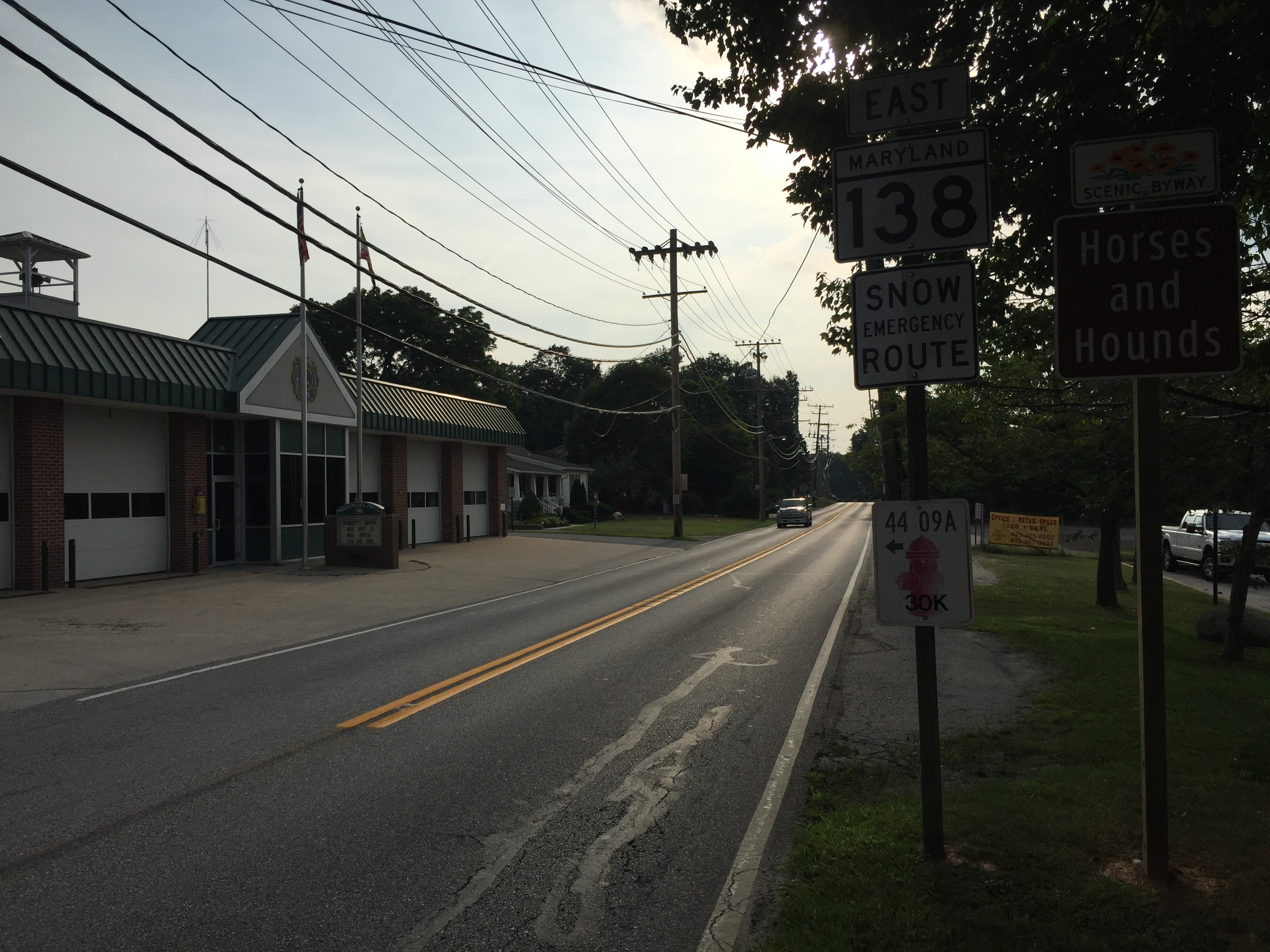

- Location within the State of Maryland Hereford (the United States)
- Coordinates: 39°35′20″N 76°39′48″W
- Country: United States
- State: Maryland
- County: Baltimore
- Time zone: UTC-5 (Eastern (EST))
  - Summer (DST): UTC-4 (EDT)
- Area code: 410

Hereford is an unincorporated community in Baltimore County, Maryland, United States. Hereford most commonly refers to the stores and residences around Exit 27, off Interstate 83, including Graul's Market, an M&T Bank branch, and an Exxon gas station. Mount Carmel Road and York Road act as vital corridors into, out of, and within the Hereford community. Hereford is best known for its unique microclimate which differs significantly from other Baltimore County communities. Addresses in Hereford are listed as being in Parkton, which also encompasses the northern Baltimore County community of Maryland Line.

Hereford is an important crossroads for commuters traveling between Pennsylvania (primarily York County) and Baltimore. The community is more or less a halfway point between the northern border of Baltimore City and the Mason–Dixon line. Hereford also serves as a miniature commercial hub for surrounding communities in northern Baltimore County, with the Hereford corridor of Mount Carmel Road, featuring several banks, pharmacies, medical offices, and a grocery store.

For Baltimore and York County residents, Hereford is most easily accessed via Interstate 83 at Exit 27. Travelers coming from northwestern Baltimore County or Carroll County can access Hereford via Maryland Route 137, while those coming from northeastern Baltimore County and Harford County often use Maryland Route 138.
