= Hampstead, Maryland =

- Town
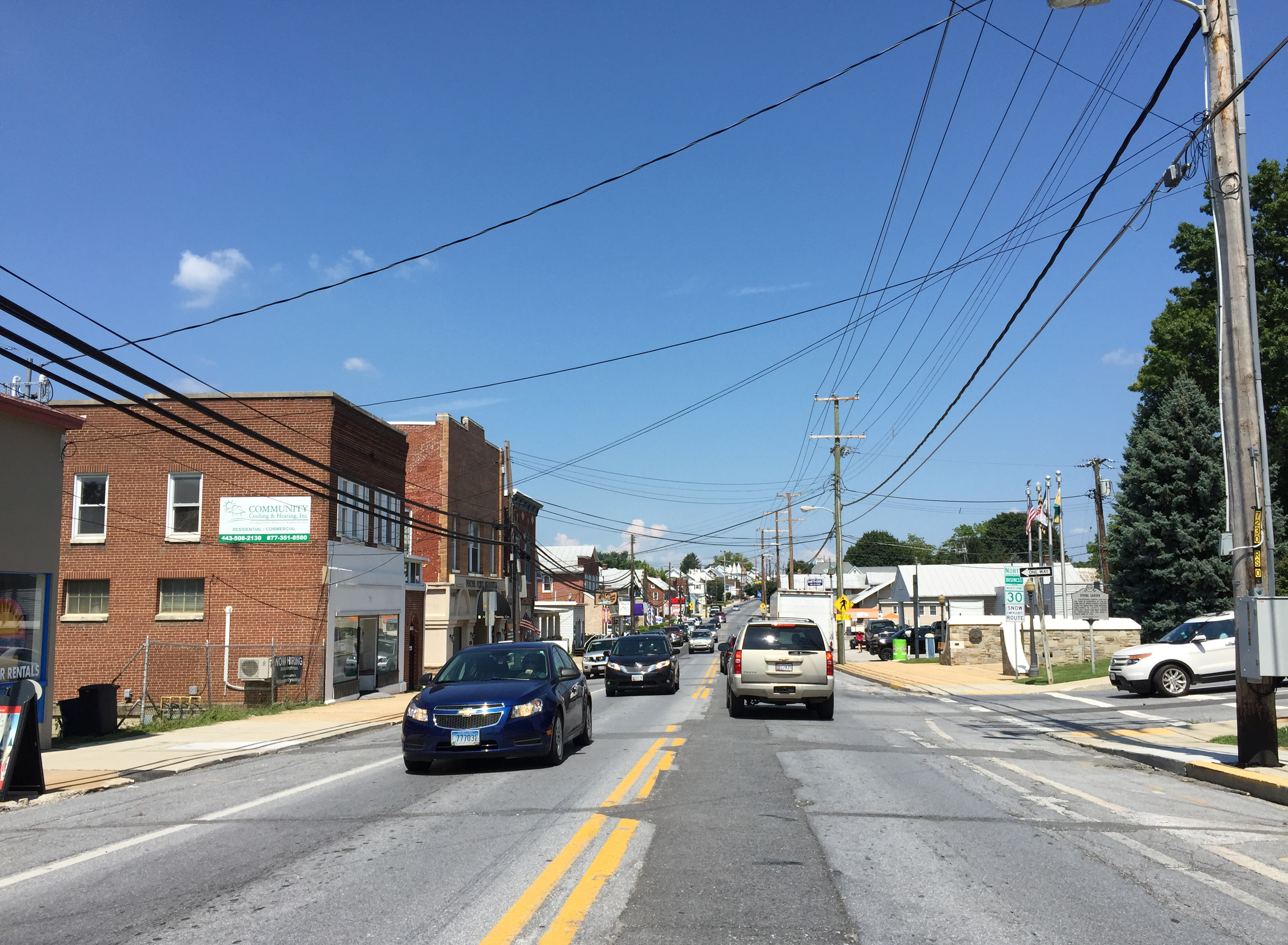
- Northbound on Main Street in Hampstead

- Flag Seal

- Location of Hampstead, Maryland

- Location within the United States Location within Maryland
- Coordinates: 39°36′37″N 76°51′5″W
- Country: United States
- State: Maryland
- County: Carroll
- Incorporated: 1888

Government
  - Mayor: Christopher Nevin

Area
  - Total: 3.33 sq mi (8.62 km^{2})
  - Land: 3.30 sq mi (8.55 km^{2})
  - Water: 0.031 sq mi (0.08 km^{2})
- Elevation: 928 ft (283 m)

Population (2020)
  - Total: 6,241
  - Density: 1,890.9/sq mi (730.09/km^{2})
- Time zone: UTC-5 (Eastern (EST))
  - Summer (DST): UTC-4 (EDT)
- ZIP code: 21074
- Area codes: 410,443
- FIPS code: 24-36500
- GNIS feature ID: 0590408
- Website: www.hampsteadmd.gov

Hampstead is a town in Carroll County in the U.S. state of Maryland. As of the 2020 census, Hampstead had a population of 6,241.

== History ==
Originally called Spring Garden, the town of Hampstead was named after Hampstead, in England. The Western Maryland Railway reached Hampstead in 1879. The town was incorporated in 1888.

Hampstead School was listed on the National Register of Historic Places in 2002. Once defunct and derelict, it was rehabilitated and is now The Residences at Hampstead School, a retirement facility.

== Geography ==
Hampstead is located at 39°36′37″N 76°51′5″W (39.610303, -76.851493). According to the United States Census Bureau, the town has a total area of 3.21 square miles (8.31 km^{2}), of which 3.19 square miles (8.26 km^{2}) is land and 0.02 square miles (0.05 km^{2}) is water.

Hampstead is approximately 3 miles (5 km) south of Manchester, 6 miles (10 km) east of Westminster, and 9 miles (14 km) north of Reisterstown.

== Demographics ==
Historical population
Census	Pop.	Note	%±
1860	198		—
1870	235		18.7%
1880	306		30.2%
1890	521		70.3%
1900	480		−7.9%
1910	555		15.6%
1920	566		2.0%
1930	905		59.9%
1940	664		−26.6%
1950	677		2.0%
1960	696		2.8%
1970	961		38.1%
1980	1,293		34.5%
1990	2,608		101.7%
2000	5,060		94.0%
2010	6,323		25.0%
2020	6,241		−1.3%
U.S. Decennial Census

=== 2020 census ===
As of the 2020 census, Hampstead had a population of 6,241. The median age was 37.7 years. 24.7% of residents were under the age of 18 and 12.5% of residents were 65 years of age or older. For every 100 females there were 92.8 males, and for every 100 females age 18 and over there were 86.8 males age 18 and over.

95.1% of residents lived in urban areas, while 4.9% lived in rural areas.

There were 2,468 households in Hampstead, of which 35.9% had children under the age of 18 living in them. Of all households, 49.1% were married-couple households, 16.0% were households with a male householder and no spouse or partner present, and 29.7% were households with a female householder and no spouse or partner present. About 28.4% of all households were made up of individuals and 13.1% had someone living alone who was 65 years of age or older.

There were 2,598 housing units, of which 5.0% were vacant. The homeowner vacancy rate was 1.1% and the rental vacancy rate was 5.3%.

Racial composition as of the 2020 census
Race	Number	Percent
White	5,441	87.2%
Black or African American	174	2.8%
American Indian and Alaska Native	14	0.2%
Asian	130	2.1%
Native Hawaiian and Other Pacific Islander	4	0.1%
Some other race	102	1.6%
Two or more races	376	6.0%
Hispanic or Latino (of any race)	263	4.2%

=== 2010 census ===
As of the census of 2010, there were 6,323 people, 2,415 households, and 1,658 families living in the town. The population density was 1,982.1 inhabitants per square mile (765.3/km^{2}). There were 2,500 housing units at an average density of 783.7 per square mile (302.6/km^{2}). The racial makeup of the town was 94.0% White, 2.0% African American, 0.3% Native American, 1.4% Asian, 0.9% from other races, and 1.5% from two or more races. Hispanic or Latino of any race were 3.0% of the population.

There were 2,415 households, of which 42.5% had children under the age of 18 living with them, 52.8% were married couples living together, 11.4% had a female householder with no husband present, 4.5% had a male householder with no wife present, and 31.3% were non-families. 26.7% of all households were made up of individuals, and 11.1% had someone living alone who was 65 years of age or older. The average household size was 2.62 and the average family size was 3.20.

The median age in the town was 35.2 years. 28.4% of residents were under the age of 18; 7.7% were between the ages of 18 and 24; 30.1% were from 25 to 44; 23.9% were from 45 to 64; and 9.8% were 65 years of age or older. The gender makeup of the town was 47.3% male and 52.7% female.

=== 2000 census ===
As of the census of 2000, there were 5,060 people, 1,787 households, and 1,327 families living in the town. The population density was 1,887.1 inhabitants per square mile (728.6/km^{2}). There were 1,851 housing units at an average density of 690.3 per square mile (266.5/km^{2}). The racial makeup of the town was 97.79% White, 0.79% African American, 0.06% Native American, 0.51% Asian, 0.06% from other races, and 0.79% from two or more races. Hispanic or Latino of any race were 1.09% of the population.

There were 1,787 households, out of which 50.7% had children under the age of 18 living with them, 59.3% were married couples living together, 11.4% had a female householder with no husband present, and 25.7% were non-families. 21.6% of all households were made up of individuals, and 6.7% had someone living alone who was 65 years of age or older. The average household size was 2.83 and the average family size was 3.32.

In the town, the population was spread out, with 34.7% under the age of 18, 5.8% from 18 to 24, 39.5% from 25 to 44, 14.2% from 45 to 64, and 5.8% who were 65 years of age or older. The median age was 31 years. For every 100 females, there were 94.3 males. For every 100 females age 18 and over, there were 88.0 males.

The median income for a household in the town was $56,655, and the median income for a family was $62,460. Males had a median income of $45,000 versus $30,407 for females. The per capita income for the town was $22,730. About 1.3% of families and 2.4% of the population were below the poverty line, including 1.5% of those under age 18 and 6.4% of those age 65 or over.

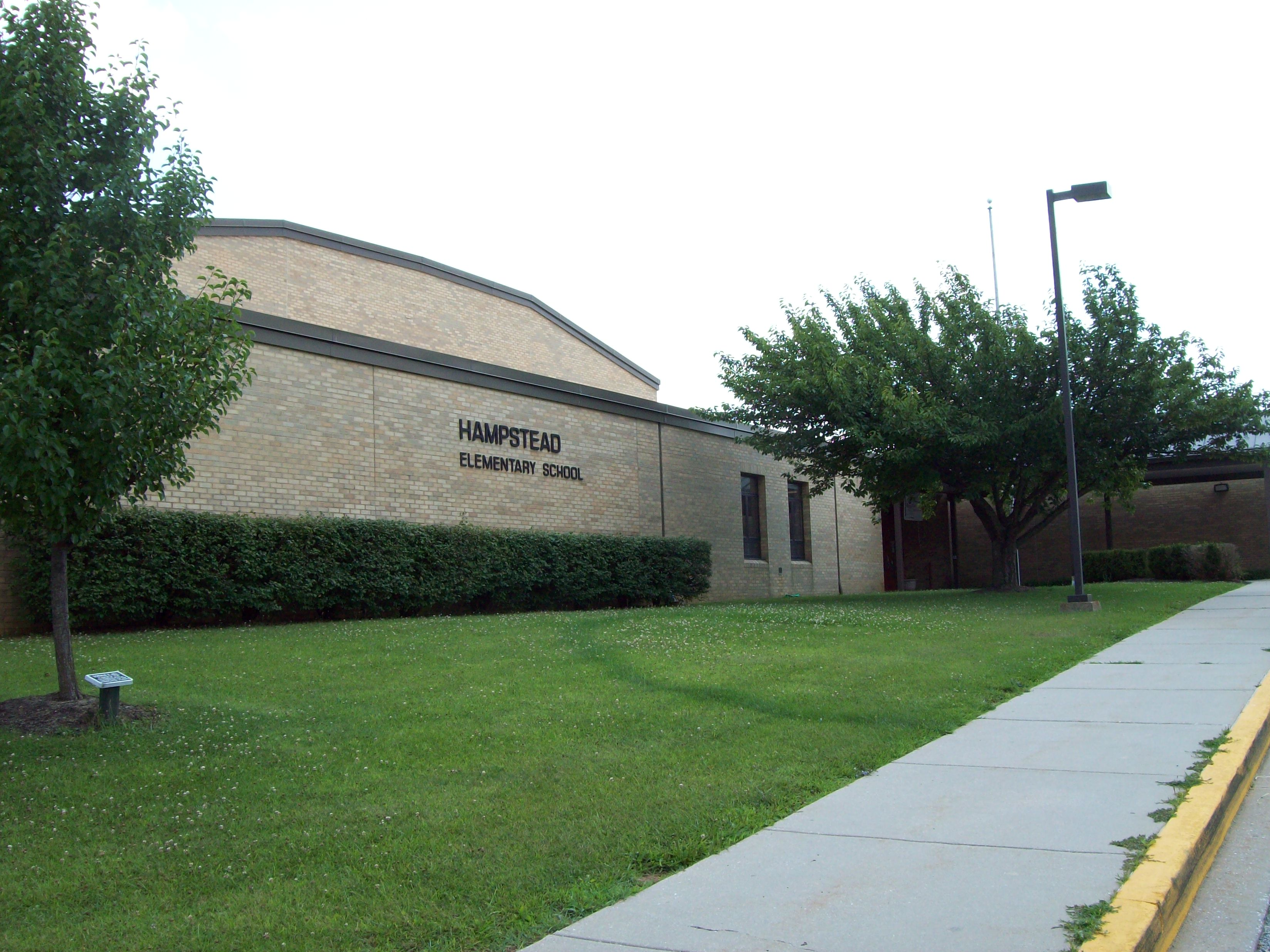
Hampstead Elementary School

== Education ==
The main schools In Hampstead are North Carroll Middle School, Shiloh Middle School, Spring Garden Elementary School and Hampstead Elementary School, which also service other towns and unincorporated areas nearby.

== Transportation ==
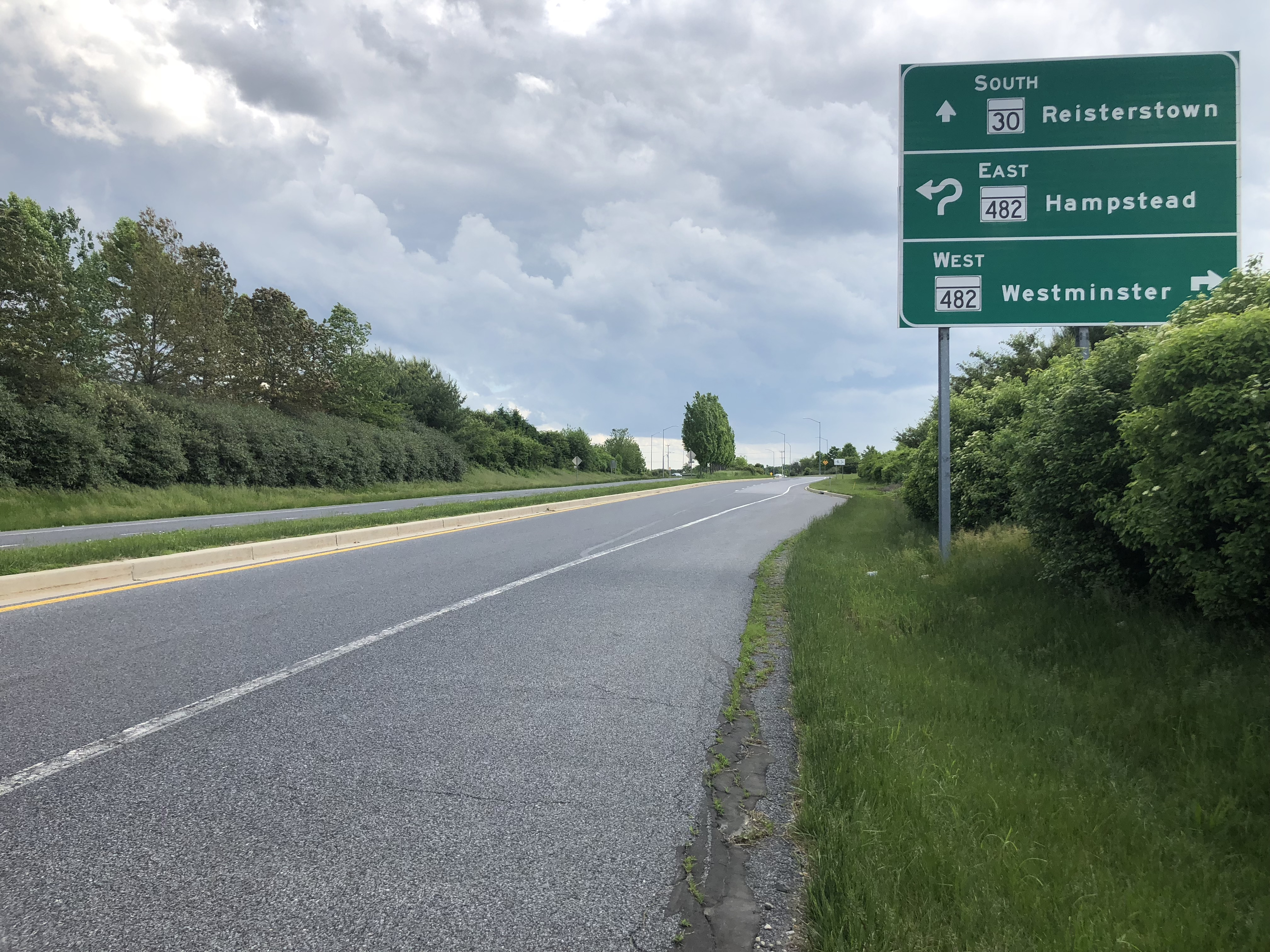
MD 30 southbound in Hampstead

The primary means of travel to and from Hampstead is by road. Maryland Route 30 is the most prominent highway serving the town. Formerly passing directly through the center of town, MD 30 now follows a bypass on the west side of Hampstead, with the original alignment now designated Maryland Route 30 Business. MD 30 provides connections northward to Manchester and southward to Reisterstown. Other highways serving Hampstead include Maryland Route 88, Maryland Route 482 and Maryland Route 833.

The Owings Mills station of the Baltimore Metro SubwayLink in nearby Owings Mills, Baltimore County, is a 20-minute drive by car from Hampstead and provides subway access to downtown Baltimore.
