= Mount Vernon Mill No. 1 =

Historic building in Maryland, USA

- U.S. National Register of Historic Places
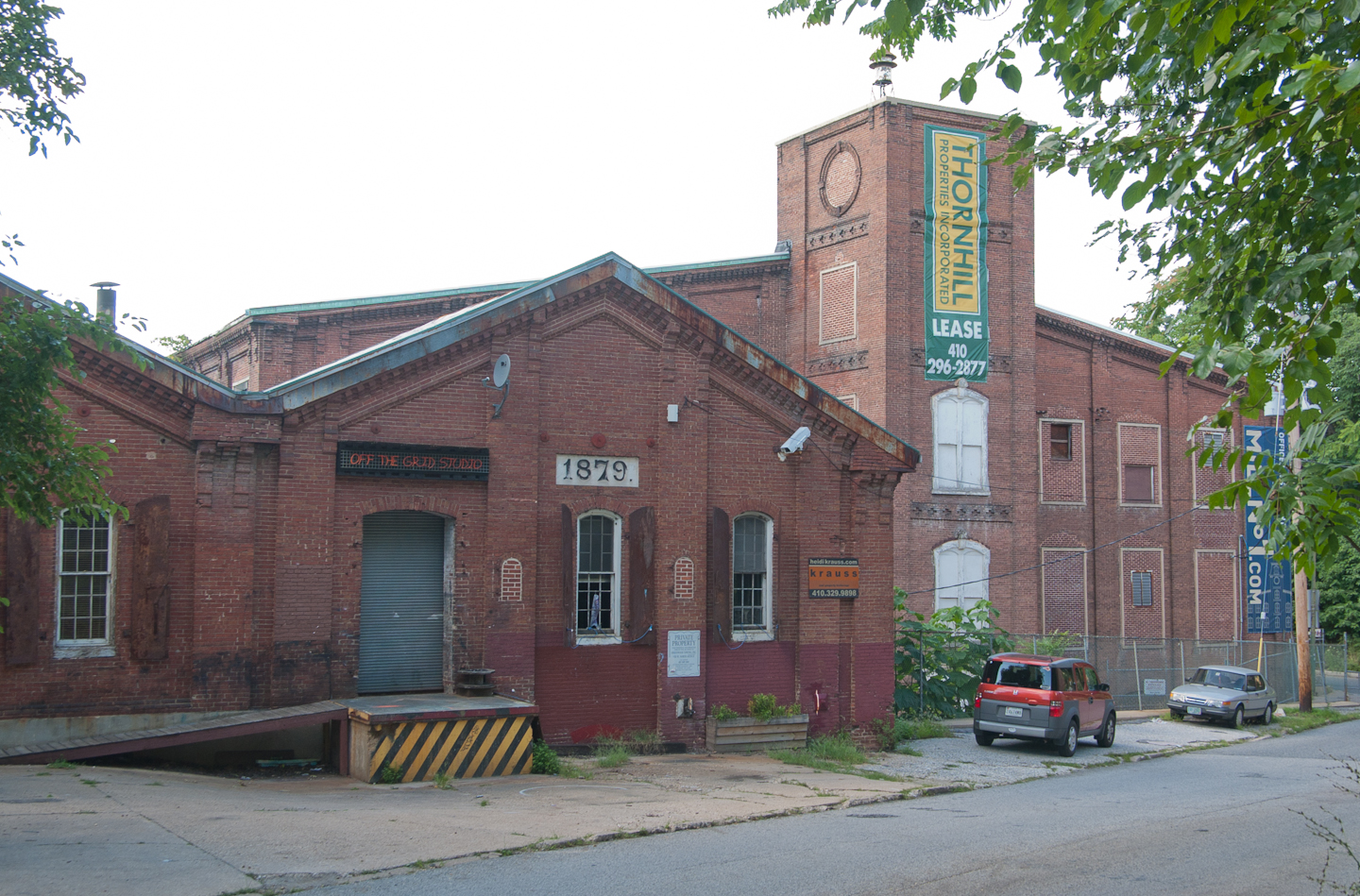
- Mount Vernon Mill No. 1, August 2011

- Location within Baltimore Location within Maryland Location within the United States
- Location: 3000 Falls Rd., Baltimore, Maryland
- Coordinates: 39°19′23″N 76°37′52″W
- Area: 5.1 acres (2.1 ha)
- Built: 1873
- Architectural style: Italianate
- NRHP reference No.: 01000388
- Added to NRHP: April 19, 2001

Mount Vernon Mill No. 1 is a historic cotton mill complex located at Baltimore, Maryland, United States. It was constructed between 1873 and 1918 and consists of four buildings situated along Jones Falls. The complex consists of three closely associated 19th-century buildings and a 20th-century warehouse. There is a large, three-story brick Mill Building (1873); a two-story, brick, L-shaped Picker House (1873); a two-story, brick Store House (c. 1881); and a later, reinforced-concrete warehouse (1918). It served as headquarters for Mount Vernon-Woodberry Mills, one of the world's largest producers of cotton duck.

Mount Vernon Mill No. 1 was listed on the National Register of Historic Places in 2003.

The mill complex, now referred to generally as Mill No. 1, was purchased by Terra Nova Ventures, LLC and began renovations in 2012 to create a mixed-use project of apartments, offices and restaurants. The Mill No. 1 boasts, "The architecture team, Alexander Design Studio has figured out how to make this complicated project work, while keeping the integrity and character of the historic buildings... The structures’ overall historic significance and fabric in their beautiful setting [and] location have been maintained, while adapting the structures to incorporate new uses..." Anyone interested in commercial or residential space in the building may contact Thornhill Properties, Inc. who now manage the building.
