= Butler, Maryland =

Unincorporated community in Maryland, United States

- Unincorporated community
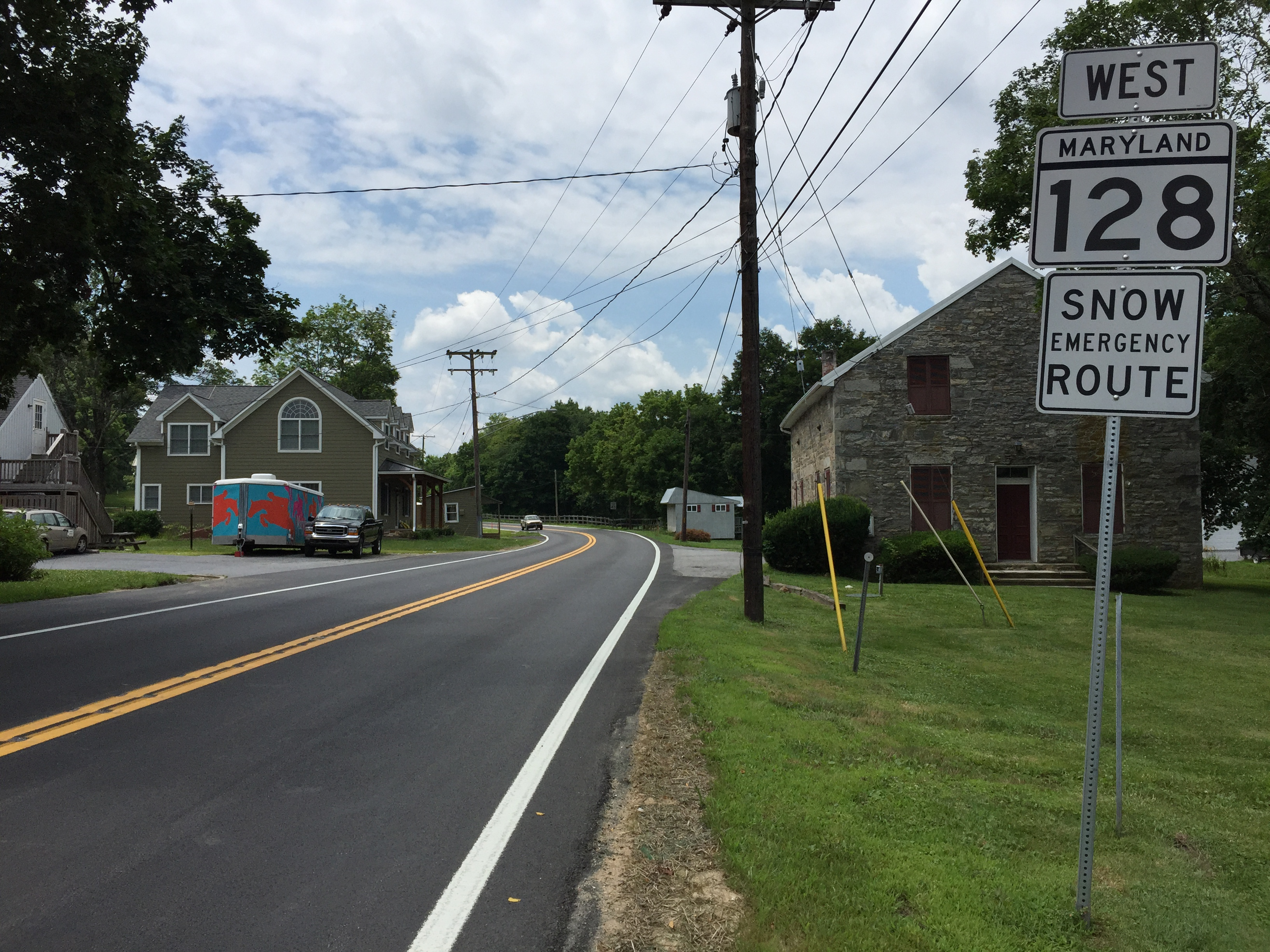
- MD 128 in Butler

- Location within the State of Maryland Butler, Maryland (the United States)
- Coordinates: 39°32′07″N 76°43′41″W
- Country: United States
- State: Maryland
- County: Baltimore
- Time zone: UTC-5 (Eastern (EST))
  - Summer (DST): UTC-4 (EDT)
- ZIP code: 21023

Butler is an unincorporated community in Baltimore County, Maryland, United States. It is bordered to the west by Glyndon, to the east by Sparks, to the south by Cockeysville and to the north by Upperco. It is often referred to as "Worthington Valley". For almost a century, Butler has served as home to many equestrian events, including the Grand Nationals and the Hunt Cup.

The history of the town is unknown. However, it has served as home to many of the state's oldest and wealthiest families for at least 150 years. Butler also serves as home to two very historic churches. St. John's Episcopal Church serves as the burial place for many of Maryland's politicians from the late 18th, 19th, and early 20th centuries. Also, Black Rock Primitive Baptist Church is the site of the historic "Black Rock Address" which occurred on September 28, 1832.

The community of Butler consists of a fire station, saddlery, liquor store, general store, post office (which is attached to the general store), a bike-and-coffee shop, and roughly five other smaller shops and businesses. At least two residences raise cattle, and many more raise and breed horses.

Most of the area's land is preserved and home to historic landmark houses/estates, making it one of the most picturesque places in Baltimore County. It forms a small commercial crossroads in the Western Run-Belfast Road Historic District. The district was added to the National Register of Historic Places in 1979.
