= List of Baltimore City Public Schools =

This is a list of all schools (traditional and charter) served by the Baltimore City Public School System in Baltimore, Maryland.

== Elementary schools ==
School number	School name	Neighborhood	Grades served	Management type	Enrollment type	Title I	Address	Coordinates	Website
50	Abbottston Elementary School	Coldstream-Homestead-Montebello	Pre-k to 5	Traditional	Neighborhood	Schoolwide	1300 Gorsuch Avenue	39.3249808°N 76.5995078999999°W	BCPSS site
145	Alexander Hamilton Elementary School	Franklintown Road	Pre-k to 5	Traditional	Neighborhood	Schoolwide	800 Poplar Grove Street	39.2976548°N 76.6659177999999°W	BCPSS site
164	Arundel Elementary School	Cherry Hill	Pre-k to 2	Traditional	Neighborhood	Schoolwide	2400 Round Road	39.2522289°N 76.6276449°W	BCPSS site
217	Belmont Elementary School	Rosemont	Pre-k to 5	Traditional	Neighborhood	Schoolwide	1406 N Ellamont Street	39.3034981°N 76.6709596°W	BCPSS site
231	Brehms Lane Public Charter School	Belair-Edison	Pre-k to 5	Charter	Neighborhood	Schoolwide	3536 Brehms Lane	39.3214397°N 76.5662916999999°W	BCPSS site School site
251	Callaway Elementary School	Dolfield	Pre-k to 5	Traditional	Neighborhood	Schoolwide	3701 Fernhill Avenue	39.3362914°N 76.6782678°W	BCPSS site
7	Cecil Elementary School	East Baltimore Midway	Pre-k to 5	Traditional	Neighborhood	Schoolwide	2000 Cecil Avenue	39.3131835°N 76.6063401999999°W	BCPSS site
34	Charles Carroll Barrister Elementary School	Washington Village	Pre-k to 5	Traditional	Neighborhood	Schoolwide	1327 Washington Boulevard	39.279824°N 76.6359449°W	BCPSS site School site
384	Creative City Public Charter School	Towanda-Grantley	K to 5	Charter	Charter lottery	Schoolwide	2810 Shirley Avenue	39.3340551°N 76.6651848999999°W	BCPSS site School site
39	Dallas F. Nicholas Sr., Elementary School	Barclay	Pre-k to 5	Traditional	Neighborhood	Schoolwide	201 E 21st Street	39.3130485°N 76.6136324°W	BCPSS site
61	Dorothy I. Height Elementary School	Reservoir Hill	Pre-k to 5	Traditional	Neighborhood	Schoolwide	2011 Linden Avenue	39.3117747°N 76.6325167999999°W	BCPSS site
250	Dr. Bernard Harris Sr., Elementary School	Oliver	Pre-k to 5	Traditional	Neighborhood	Schoolwide	1400 N Caroline Street	39.3066527999999°N 76.5988472999999°W	BCPSS site
62	Edgecombe Circle Elementary School	Parklane	Pre-k to 5	Traditional	Neighborhood	Schoolwide	2835 Virginia Avenue	39.3447302999999°N 76.6624779°W	BCPSS site
67	Edgewood Elementary School	Fairmount	Pre-k to 5	Traditional	Neighborhood	Schoolwide	1900 Edgewood Street	39.3090877°N 76.6765535°W	BCPSS site
11	Eutaw-Marshburn Elementary School	Madison Park	Pre-k to 5	Traditional	Neighborhood	Schoolwide	1624 Eutaw Place	39.306084°N 76.6301700999999°W	BCPSS site
45	Federal Hill Preparatory Academy	Federal Hill	Pre-k to 5	Traditional	Neighborhood	Targeted	1040 William Street	39.2775611°N 76.6111515999999°W	BCPSS site
260	Frederick Elementary School	Millhill	Pre-k to 5	Charter	Neighborhood	Schoolwide	2501 Frederick Avenue	39.2823962°N 76.6567028°W	BCPSS site
206	Furley Elementary School	Frankford	Pre-k to 5	Traditional	Neighborhood	Schoolwide	5001 Sinclair Lane	39.3208651°N 76.5453281°W	BCPSS site
125	Furman Templeton Preparatory Academy	Upton	Pre-k to 5	Charter	Neighborhood	Schoolwide	1200 Pennsylvania Avenue	39.299712°N 76.6303514°W	BCPSS site School site
211	Gardenville Elementary School	Gardenville	Pre-k to 5	Traditional	Neighborhood	Schoolwide	5300 Belair Road	39.3389019°N 76.552526°W	BCPSS site
22	George Washington Elementary School	Washington Village	Pre-k to 5	Traditional	Neighborhood	Schoolwide	800 Scott Street	39.2811575°N 76.6292045°W	BCPSS site
107	Gilmor Elementary School	Sandtown-Winchester	Pre-k to 5	Traditional	Neighborhood	Schoolwide	1311 N Gilmor Street	39.3043315°N 76.6424690999999°W	BCPSS site
213	Govans Elementary School	Belvedere	Pre-k to 5	Charter	Neighborhood	Schoolwide	5801 York Road	39.3605731°N 76.6082738999999°W	BCPSS site School site
332	Green School of Baltimore, The	Belair-Edison	K to 5	Charter	Charter lottery		2851 Kentucky Avenue	39.3242579°N 76.5719047°W	BCPSS site School site
60	Gwynns Falls Elementary School	Hanlon Longwood	Pre-k to 5	Traditional	Neighborhood	Schoolwide	2700 Gwynns Falls Parkway	39.3151841°N 76.6639027°W	BCPSS site School site
37	Harford Heights Elementary School	South Clifton Park	Pre-k to 5	Traditional	Neighborhood	Schoolwide	1919 N Broadway	39.3138917°N 76.5947277°W	BCPSS site School site
21	Hilton Elementary School	Hanlon Longwood	Pre-k to 5	Traditional	Neighborhood	Schoolwide	3301 Carlisle Avenue	39.3191306°N 76.6738467999999°W	BCPSS site
122	Historic Samuel Coleridge-Taylor Elementary School, The	Heritage Crossing	Pre-k to 5	Traditional	Neighborhood	Schoolwide	507 W Preston Street	39.2987592°N 76.6263556°W	BCPSS site School site
144	James Mosher Elementary School	Bridgeview/Greenlawn	Pre-k to 5	Traditional	Neighborhood	Schoolwide	2400 W Mosher Street	39.299843°N 76.6558281999999°W	BCPSS site
16	Johnston Square Elementary School	Johnston Square	Pre-k to 5	Traditional	Neighborhood	Schoolwide	1101 Valley Street	39.3033505°N 76.6044279999999°W	BCPSS site
64	Liberty Elementary School	Central Forest Park	Pre-k to 5	Traditional	Neighborhood	Schoolwide	3901 Maine Avenue	39.3263526°N 76.6843473°W	BCPSS site School site
261	Lockerman Bundy Elementary School	Penrose-Fayette Street Outreach	Pre-k to 5	Traditional	Neighborhood	Schoolwide	301 N Pulaski Street	39.2924416°N 76.6498682°W	BCPSS site
150	Mary Ann Winterling Elementary School at Bentalou	Penrose-Fayette Street Outreach	Pre-k to 5	Traditional	Neighborhood	Schoolwide	220 N Bentalou Street	39.2917419°N 76.6534542°W	BCPSS site
204	Mary E. Rodman Elementary School	Westgate	Pre-k to 5	Traditional	Neighborhood	Schoolwide	201 North Bend Road	39.2844736°N 76.7045256999999°W	BCPSS site
29	Matthew A. Henson Elementary School	Easterwood	Pre-k to 5	Traditional	Neighborhood	Schoolwide	1600 N Payson Street	39.3068035999999°N 76.6500805°W	BCPSS site
249	Medfield Heights Elementary School	Medfield	Pre-k to 5	Traditional	Neighborhood		4300 Buchanan Avenue	39.3408628°N 76.6425798°W	BCPSS site School site
105	Moravia Park Elementary School	Frankford	Pre-k to 5	Traditional	Neighborhood	Schoolwide	6001 Frankford Avenue	39.3195818°N 76.5406921999999°W	BCPSS site
330	Northwood Appold Community Academy	Hillen	K to 5	Charter	Charter lottery	Targeted	4417 Loch Raven Boulevard	39.3457217°N 76.5917394°W	BCPSS site School site
242	Northwood Elementary School	Perring Loch	Pre-k to 5	Traditional	Neighborhood	Schoolwide	5201 Loch Raven Boulevard	39.3527384°N 76.5887821999999°W	BCPSS site
142	Robert W. Coleman Elementary School	Mondawmin	Pre-k to 5	Traditional	Neighborhood	Schoolwide	2400 Windsor Avenue	39.3129875°N 76.655259°W	BCPSS site
379	Roots and Branches School	Harlem Park	K to 5	Charter	Charter lottery	Schoolwide	1807 Harlem Avenue	39.2960321°N 76.6465979999999°W	BCPSS site School site
73	Sarah M. Roach Elementary School	Saint Josephs	Pre-k to 5	Traditional	Neighborhood	Schoolwide	3434 Old Frederick Road	39.2828773°N 76.6745685999999°W	BCPSS site
314	Sharp-Leadenhall Elementary School	Sharp-Leadenhall	1 to 5	Separate public day	Special needs placement		150 W West Street	39.276549°N 76.6187972999999°W	BCPSS site School site
248	Sinclair Lane Elementary School	Belair-Edison	Pre-k to 5	Traditional	Neighborhood	Schoolwide	3880 Sinclair Lane	39.3150658°N 76.5607891999999°W	BCPSS site
4	Steuart Hill Academic Academy	Union Square	Pre-k to 5	Traditional	Neighborhood	Schoolwide	30 S Gilmor Street	39.2868134°N 76.6426703999999°W	BCPSS site
83	William Paca Elementary School	McElderry Park	Pre-k to 5	Traditional	Neighborhood	Schoolwide	200 N Lakewood Avenue	39.2953732°N 76.5796397°W	BCPSS site
23	Wolfe Street Academy	Upper Fell's Point	Pre-k to 5	Charter	Neighborhood	Schoolwide	245 S Wolfe Street	39.2880007°N 76.5899094°W	BCPSS site School site
219	Yorkwood Elementary School	Loch Raven	Pre-k to 5	Traditional	Neighborhood	Schoolwide	5931 Yorkwood Road	39.3636853°N 76.5812469999999°W	BCPSS site

== Elementary/middle schools ==
School number	School name	Neighborhood	Grades served	Management type	Enrollment type	Title I	Address	Coordinates	Website
234	Arlington Elementary/Middle School	Arlington	Pre-k to 8	Traditional	Neighborhood	Schoolwide	3910 Barrington Road	39.3323212°N 76.6844389°W	BCPSS site
243	Armistead Gardens Elementary/Middle School	Armistead Gardens	Pre-k to 8	Traditional	Neighborhood	Schoolwide	5001 E Eager Street	39.3047544°N 76.5526436°W	BCPSS site School site
375	Baltimore Collegiate School for Boys	Cameron Village	4 to 8	Charter	Charter lottery	Targeted	900 Woodbourne Ave	39.3551367°N 76.6014652999999°W	BCPSS site School site
335	Baltimore International Academy	Frankford	K to 8	Charter	Charter lottery		4410 Frankford Avenue	39.336093°N 76.548781°W	BCPSS site
336	Baltimore Montessori Public Charter School	Greenmount West	Pre-k to 8	Charter	Charter lottery		1600 Guilford Avenue	39.3081642°N 76.6124786°W	BCPSS site School site
54	Barclay Elementary/Middle School	Abell	Pre-k to 8	Traditional	Neighborhood	Schoolwide	2900 Barclay Street	39.3237291°N 76.6113201°W	BCPSS site
124	Bay-Brook Elementary/Middle School	Cherry Hill	Pre-k to 8	Traditional	Neighborhood	Schoolwide	2501 Seabury Road	39.252256°N 76.6210409999999°W	BCPSS site
246	Beechfield Elementary/Middle School	Yale Heights	Pre-k to 8	Traditional	Neighborhood	Schoolwide	301 S Beechfield Avenue	39.2807962°N 76.6936167999999°W	BCPSS site
75	Calverton Elementary/Middle School	Bridgeview/Greenlawn	Pre-k to 8	Traditional	Neighborhood	Schoolwide	201 North Bend Road	39.2844736°N 76.7045256999999°W	BCPSS site
256	Calvin M. Rodwell Elementary/Middle School	Howard Park	Pre-k to 8	Traditional	Neighborhood	Schoolwide	5545 Kennison Avenue	39.3421944°N 76.6994169999999°W	BCPSS site
159	Cherry Hill Elementary/Middle School	Cherry Hill	3 to 8	Traditional	Neighborhood	Schoolwide	801 Bridgeview Road	39.2479244°N 76.6238971999999°W	BCPSS site School site
326	City Neighbors Charter School	Cedmont	K to 8	Charter	Charter lottery		4301 Raspe Avenue	39.3488855°N 76.5345229°W	BCPSS site School site
346	City Neighbors Hamilton	Glenham-Belhar	K to 8	Charter	Charter lottery		5609 Sefton Avenue	39.3504559°N 76.5547887999999°W	BCPSS site School site
8	City Springs Elementary/Middle School	Washington Hill	Pre-k to 8	Charter	Neighborhood	Schoolwide	100 S Caroline Street	39.2898428°N 76.5974931°W	BCPSS site
97	Collington Square Elementary/Middle School	Broadway East	Pre-k to 8	Traditional	Neighborhood	Schoolwide	1409 N Collington Avenue	39.3072271°N 76.5866990999999°W	BCPSS site
27	Commodore John Rodgers Elementary/Middle School	Butchers Hill	Pre-k to 8	Traditional	Neighborhood	Schoolwide	100 N Chester Street	39.2935844°N 76.5881474999999°W	BCPSS site School site
247	Cross Country Elementary/Middle School	Cross country	Pre-k to 8	Traditional	Entrance criteria, neighborhood	Schoolwide	6100 Cross Country Boulevard	39.3625248°N 76.6882630999999°W	BCPSS site
207	Curtis Bay Elementary/Middle School	Curtis Bay	Pre-k to 8	Traditional	Neighborhood	Schoolwide	4301 West Bay Avenue	39.226236°N 76.59302°W	BCPSS site
201	Dickey Hill Elementary/Middle School	Wakefield	Pre-k to 8	Traditional	Neighborhood	Schoolwide	5025 Dickey Hill Road	39.3114128°N 76.7035981999999°W	BCPSS site
254	Dr. Martin Luther King Jr., Elementary/Middle School	Park Circle	Pre-k to 8	Traditional	Neighborhood	Schoolwide	3750 Greenspring Avenue	39.3331917°N 76.6568889°W	BCPSS site
58	Dr. Nathan A. Pitts-Ashburton Elementary/Middle School	East Arlington	Pre-k to 8	Traditional	Neighborhood	Schoolwide	3935 Hilton Road	39.3308233°N 76.6675308999999°W	BCPSS site
734	Elementary/Middle Alternative Program	Harlem Park	K to 8	Alternative	Alternative placement		1500 Harlem Avenue	39.297127°N 76.641075°W	BCPSS site
368	Elmer A. Henderson: A Johns Hopkins Partnership School	Middle East	K to 8	Contract	Charter lottery, neighborhood, specialized	Schoolwide	2100 Ashland Avenue	39.2999758°N 76.587448°W	BCPSS site School site
262	Empowerment Academy	Evergreen Lawn	Pre-k to 8	Charter	Charter lottery	Targeted	851 Braddish Avenue	39.297427°N 76.6591515°W	BCPSS site School site
241	Fallstaff Elementary/Middle School	Fallstaff	Pre-k to 8	Traditional	Neighborhood	Schoolwide	3801 Fallstaff Road	39.3621351°N 76.7054218°W	BCPSS site
85	Fort Worthington Elementary/Middle School	Berea	K to 8	Traditional	Neighborhood	Schoolwide	2710 E Hoffman Street	39.3075646°N 76.5788726°W	BCPSS site
76	Francis Scott Key Elementary/Middle School	Locust Point	Pre-k to 8	Traditional	Entrance criteria, neighborhood	Schoolwide	1425 E Fort Avenue	39.268222°N 76.594872°W	BCPSS site School site
95	Franklin Square Elementary/Middle School	Franklin Square	Pre-k to 8	Traditional	Neighborhood	Schoolwide	1400 W Lexington Street	39.2911383°N 76.6407431999999°W	BCPSS site School site
212	Garrett Heights Elementary/Middle School	Lauraville	Pre-k to 8	Traditional	Neighborhood	Schoolwide	2800 Ailsa Avenue	39.3494958°N 76.5696312°W	BCPSS site School site
235	Glenmount Elementary/Middle School	Glenham-Belhar	Pre-k to 8	Traditional	Neighborhood	Schoolwide	6211 Walther Avenue	39.351911°N 76.5413462999999°W	BCPSS site
240	Graceland Park/O'Donnell Heights Elementary/Middle School	Graceland Park	Pre-k to 8	Traditional	Neighborhood	Schoolwide	6300 O'Donnell Street	39.2825329°N 76.5396787999999°W	BCPSS site
214	Guilford Elementary/Middle School	Guilford	Pre-k to 8	Traditional	Neighborhood	Schoolwide	4520 York Road	39.3441943°N 76.6106221°W	BCPSS site
236	Hamilton Elementary/Middle School	Westfield	Pre-k to 8	Traditional	Neighborhood, specialized		6101 Old Harford Road	39.3597688°N 76.5577187999999°W	BCPSS site
55	Hampden Elementary/Middle School	Hampden	Pre-k to 8	Traditional	Neighborhood		3608 Chestnut Avenue	39.3321896°N 76.6299895999999°W	BCPSS site
47	Hampstead Hill Academy	Canton	Pre-k to 8	Charter	Neighborhood		500 S Linwood Avenue	39.2859113°N 76.5763182°W	BCPSS site School site
35	Harlem Park Elementary/Middle School	Harlem Park	Pre-k to 8	Traditional	Neighborhood	Schoolwide	1401 W Lafayette Avenue	39.2975072°N 76.6413615°W	BCPSS site
210	Hazelwood Elementary/Middle School	Frankford	Pre-k to 8	Traditional	Neighborhood	Schoolwide	4517 Hazelwood Avenue	39.338547°N 76.5383011999999°W	BCPSS site
215	Highlandtown Elementary/Middle School No. 215	Highlandtown	Pre-k to 8	Traditional	Neighborhood	Schoolwide	3223 E Pratt Street	39.289896°N 76.5705588999999°W	BCPSS site
237	Highlandtown Elementary/Middle School No. 237	Highlandtown	Pre-k to 8	Traditional	Neighborhood	Schoolwide	231 S Eaton Street	39.2891472°N 76.5647172°W	BCPSS site
229	Holabird Elementary/Middle School	Broening Manor	Pre-k to 8	Traditional	Neighborhood	Schoolwide	1500 Imla Street	39.2758333°N 76.5388844°W	BCPSS site
10	James McHenry Elementary/Middle School	Hollins Market	Pre-k to 8	Traditional	Neighborhood, specialized	Schoolwide	31 S Schroeder Street	39.2874608°N 76.6330853°W	BCPSS site
228	John Ruhrah Elementary/Middle School	Graceland Park	Pre-k to 8	Traditional	Neighborhood	Schoolwide	6820 Fait Avenue	39.2859084°N 76.5306001°W	BCPSS site
347	KIPP Harmony Academy	Cold Spring	K to 8	Charter	Charter lottery	Schoolwide	4701 Greenspring Avenue	39.345522°N 76.6572891°W	BCPSS site School site
12	Lakeland Elementary/Middle School	Lakeland	Pre-k to 8	Traditional	Neighborhood	Schoolwide	2921 Stranden Road	39.2536603°N 76.6446963999999°W	BCPSS site
245	Leith Walk Elementary/Middle School	Ramblewood	Pre-k to 8	Traditional	Neighborhood	Schoolwide	5915 Glennor Road	39.3642397°N 76.5925194°W	BCPSS site
371	Lillie May Carroll Jackson School	Cameron Village	5 to 8	Charter	Charter lottery	Targeted	900 Woodbourne Avenue	39.3551367°N 76.6014652999999°W	BCPSS site School site
313	Lois T. Murray Elementary/Middle School	Stonewood-Pentwood-Winston	Pre-k to 8	Separate public day	Special needs placement		1600 Arlington Avenue	39.3469842°N 76.5875619999999°W	BCPSS site
203	Maree G. Farring Elementary/Middle School	Brooklyn	Pre-k to 8	Traditional	Neighborhood	Schoolwide	300 Pontiac Avenue	39.2369104°N 76.6070624°W	BCPSS site
53	Margaret Brent Elementary/Middle School	Charles Village	Pre-k to 8	Traditional	Neighborhood	Schoolwide	100 E 26th Street	39.3197915°N 76.6151866999999°W	BCPSS site
321	Midtown Academy	Bolton Hill	K to 8	Charter	Charter lottery		1398 W Mount Royal Avenue	39.3084854°N 76.6224363°W	BCPSS site
381	Monarch Academy Public Charter School	Coldstream-Homestead-Montebello	K to 8	Charter	Charter lottery	Targeted	2525 Kirk Avenue	39.3190193999999°N 76.6003819999999°W	BCPSS site School site
44	Montebello Elementary/Middle School	Montebello	Pre-k to 8	Traditional	Neighborhood	Schoolwide	2040 E 32nd Street	39.3280317°N 76.5855191°W	BCPSS site
220	Morrell Park Elementary/Middle School	Morrell Park	Pre-k to 8	Traditional	Neighborhood	Schoolwide	2601 Tolley Street	39.2628742°N 76.6507457°W	BCPSS site
66	Mount Royal Elementary/Middle School	Bolton Hill	Pre-k to 8	Traditional	Entrance criteria, neighborhood, specialized	Schoolwide	121 McMechen Street	39.3090933°N 76.6246520999999°W	BCPSS site School site
322	New Song Academy	Sandtown-Winchester	Pre-k to 8	New School Initiative	Neighborhood	Schoolwide	1530 Presstman Street	39.3056641°N 76.6429858999999°W	BCPSS site
81	North Bend Elementary/Middle School	Westgate	Pre-k to 8	Traditional	Neighborhood	Schoolwide	181 North Bend Road	39.2833435°N 76.7053573°W	BCPSS site
327	Patterson Park Public Charter School	Patterson Park	Pre-k to 8	Charter	Charter lottery	Schoolwide	27 N Lakewood Avenue	39.2927568°N 76.5787121999999°W	BCPSS site School site
223	Pimlico Elementary/Middle School	Cylburn	Pre-k to 8	Traditional	Neighborhood	Schoolwide	4849 Pimlico Road	39.3481312°N 76.6675713999999°W	BCPSS site
233	Roland Park Elementary/Middle School	Wyndhurst	Pre-k to 8	Traditional	Entrance criteria, neighborhood, specialized		5207 Roland Avenue	39.357652°N 76.6339319°W	BCPSS site School site
63	Rosemont Elementary/Middle School	Northwest Community Action	Pre-k to 8	Charter	Neighborhood	Schoolwide	2777 Presstman Street	39.3042802999999°N 76.6626676999999°W	BCPSS site School site
328	Southwest Baltimore Charter School	Washington Village	K to 8	Charter	Charter lottery	Schoolwide	1300 Herkimer Street	39.2815102°N 76.6391504°W	BCPSS site School site
13	Tench Tilghman Elementary/Middle School	CARE	Pre-k to 8	Traditional	Neighborhood	Schoolwide	600 N Patterson Park Avenue	39.2980118°N 76.5855755999999°W	BCPSS site
221	The Mount Washington School	Mount Washington	K to 8	Traditional	Neighborhood		1801 Sulgrave Avenue	39.3658571°N 76.6548528999999°W	BCPSS site School site
232	Thomas Jefferson Elementary/Middle School	Hunting Ridge	Pre-k to 8	Traditional	Neighborhood	Schoolwide	605 Dryden Drive	39.2952623°N 76.6977342999999°W	BCPSS site
84	Thomas Johnson Elementary/Middle School	Riverside	Pre-k to 8	Traditional	Neighborhood		100 E Heath Street	39.2710106°N 76.6108596999999°W	BCPSS site
373	Tunbridge Public Charter School	Homeland	Pre-k to 8	Charter	Charter lottery		5504 York Road	39.357589°N 76.6105377999999°W	BCPSS site School site
226	Violetville Elementary/Middle School	Violetville	Pre-k to 8	Traditional	Neighborhood	Schoolwide	1207 Pine Heights Avenue	39.2677918°N 76.6738791999999°W	BCPSS site
134	Walter P. Carter Elementary/Middle School	Wilson Park	Pre-k to 8	Traditional	Neighborhood	Schoolwide	820 E 43rd Street	39.3430337°N 76.6041735999999°W	BCPSS site
51	Waverly Elementary/Middle School	Waverly	Pre-k to 8	Traditional	Entrance criteria, neighborhood	Schoolwide	3400 Ellerslie Avenue	39.3301341°N 76.6041735999999°W	BCPSS site
225	Westport Academy	Westport	Pre-k to 8	Traditional	Neighborhood	Schoolwide	2401 Nevada Street	39.2621532°N 76.6375084°W	BCPSS site
88	Wildwood Elementary/Middle School	Edmondson Village	Pre-k to 8	Traditional	Neighborhood	Schoolwide	621 Wildwood Parkway	39.2949531°N 76.6835360999999°W	BCPSS site
28	William Pinderhughes Elementary/Middle School	Sandtown-Winchester	Pre-k to 8	Traditional	Neighborhood	Schoolwide	701 Gold Street	39.3063261°N 76.6404589999999°W	BCPSS site
87	Windsor Hills Elementary/Middle School	Windsor Hills	Pre-k to 8	Traditional	Neighborhood	Schoolwide	4001 Alto Road	39.316405°N 76.6828954°W	BCPSS site School site
205	Woodhome Elementary/Middle School	North Harford Road	Pre-k to 8	Traditional	Neighborhood		7300 Moyer Avenue	39.3668942°N 76.5409841°W	BCPSS site

== Middle schools ==
School number	School name	Neighborhood	Grades served	Management type	Enrollment type	Title I	Address	Coordinates	Website
337	Afya Public Charter School	Belair-Edison	6 to 8	Charter	Charter lottery	Schoolwide	2800 Brendan Avenue	39.3242973°N 76.5724043°W	BCPSS site School site
729	Angela Y. Davis Leadership Academy	Hanlon Longwood	6 to 7	Alternative	Alternative placement, specialized		2801 North Dukeland Street	39.3188328°N 76.6644374999999°W	BCPSS site
357	Banneker Blake Academy of Arts and Sciences	Kenilworth Park	6 to 8	Charter	Choice lottery	Targeted	1101 Winston Avenue	39.3485514°N 76.6002917°W	BCPSS site
130	Booker T. Washington Middle School	Madison Park	6 to 8	Traditional	Choice lottery	Schoolwide	1301 McCulloh Street	39.3033242°N 76.628365°W	BCPSS site
323	Crossroads School, The	Fell's Point	6 to 8	Charter	Charter lottery	Schoolwide	802 S Caroline Street	39.2819349°N 76.5968217999999°W	BCPSS site School site
15	Stadium School	Coldstream-Homestead-Montebello	6 to 8	Traditional	Choice lottery	Schoolwide	1400 Exeter Hall Avenue	39.3216725°N 76.6024302°W	BCPSS site
374	Vanguard Collegiate Middle School	Frankford	6 to 8	Traditional	Choice lottery	Schoolwide	5000 Truesdale Avenue	39.3201839°N 76.5458886999999°W	BCPSS site

== Middle/high schools ==
School number	School name	Neighborhood	Grades served	Management type	Enrollment type	Title I	Address	Coordinates	Website
427	Academy for College and Career Exploration	Hampden	6 to 12	Traditional	Choice lottery	Schoolwide	1300 W 36th Street	39.3308923°N 76.6377819°W	BCPSS site
382	Baltimore Design School	Greenmount West	6 to 12	Transformation	Specialized	Schoolwide	1500 Barclay Street	39.3072184°N 76.6110603999999°W	BCPSS site School site
348	Baltimore Leadership School for Young Women	Mount Vernon	6 to 12	Charter	Charter lottery	Schoolwide	128 W Franklin Street	39.2952132°N 76.6180431999999°W	BCPSS Site School site
364	Bluford Drew Jemison STEM Academy West	Harlem Park	6 to 12	Traditional	Choice lottery	Targeted	1500 Harlem Avenue	39.297127°N 76.641075°W	BCPSS site
307	Claremont School, Baltimore	Orangeville	6 to 12	Separate public day	Special needs placement		5301 Erdman Avenue	39.3028207°N 76.5545128°W	BCPSS site
325	ConneXions: A Community Based Arts School	Hanlon Longwood	6 to 12	Charter	Choice lottery	Schoolwide	2801 N Dukeland Street	39.3188328°N 76.6644374999999°W	BCPSS site School site
884	Eager Street Academy	Penn-Fallsway	6 to 12	Alternative	Alternative placement		926 Greenmount Avenue	39.3008822°N 76.6074234999999°W	BCPSS site
178	Excel Academy at Francis M. Wood High School	Poppleton	7 to 12	Alternative	Alternative placement		1001 W Saratoga Street	39.2920577999999°N 76.6342905°W	BCPSS site
377	Green Street Academy	Carroll-South Hilton	6 to 12	Charter	Charter lottery	Schoolwide	125 N Hilton Street	39.2879621°N 76.6716814°W	BCPSS site School site
345	Joseph C. Briscoe Academy	Heritage Crossing	6 to 12	Separate public day	Special needs placement		900 Druid Hill Avenue	39.2983859°N 76.6256968°W	BCPSS site
349	NACA Freedom and Democracy Academy II	Hamilton Hills	6 to 12	Transformation	Choice lottery	Targeted	2500 E Northern Parkway	39.3664664°N 76.5602021999999°W	BCPSS site School site
421	National Academy Foundation School	Dunbar-Broadway	6 to 12	Traditional	Choice lottery, specialized	Targeted	540 N Caroline Street	39.2968834°N 76.5980799°W	BCPSS site

== High schools ==
School number	School name	Neighborhood	Grades served	Management type	Enrollment type	Address	Coordinates	Website
413	Achievement Academy at Harbor City High School	Clifton Park	9 to 12	Alternative	Alternative placement	2201 Pinewood Avenue	39.3657698°N 76.570962°W	BCPSS site
430	Augusta Fells Savage Institute of Visual Arts	Harlem Park	9 to 12	Traditional	Choice lottery	1500 Harlem Avenue	39.297127°N 76.641075°W	BCPSS site
480	Baltimore City College	Coldstream-Homestead-Montebello	9 to 12	Traditional	Entrance criteria	3220 The Alameda	39.3257539°N 76.5980348°W	BCPSS site School site
403	Baltimore Polytechnic Institute	Cross Keys	9 to 12	Traditional	Entrance criteria, specialized	1400 W Cold Spring Lane	39.3469203999999°N 76.6442379°W	BCPSS site School site
415	Baltimore School for the Arts	Mount Vernon	9 to 12	Traditional	Specialized	712 Cathedral Street	39.2982372°N 76.6175336°W	BCPSS site School site
362	Bard High School Early College Baltimore	Hanlon Longwood	9 to 12	Contract	Specialized	2801 N Dukeland Street	39.3188328°N 76.6644374999999°W	BCPSS site School site
239	Benjamin Franklin High School at Masonville Cove	Curtis Bay	9 to 12	Traditional	Choice lottery	1201 Cambria Street	39.232102°N 76.594625°W	BCPSS site
303	Career Academy	Old Goucher	11 to 12	Alternative	Alternative placement	101 West 24th Street	39.3161087999999°N 76.6186887°W	BCPSS site
454	Carver Vocational Technical High School	Coppin Heights	9 to 12	Traditional	Entrance criteria, specialized	2201 Presstman Street	39.3043146°N 76.6526635999999°W	BCPSS site
376	City Neighbors High School	Glenham-Belhar	9 to 12	Charter	Charter lottery	5609 Sefton Avenue	39.3504559°N 76.5547887999999°W	BCPSS site School site
432	Coppin Academy	Mondawmin	9 to 12	Charter	Charter lottery	2500 W North Avenue	39.3100262°N 76.6587548°W	BCPSS site School site
416	Digital Harbor High School	Riverside	9 to 12	Traditional	Choice lottery	1100 Covington Street	39.2767474°N 76.6075137°W	BCPSS site
400	Edmondson-Westside High School	Allenside	9 to 12	Traditional	Entrance criteria	501 N Athol Avenue	39.291212°N 76.6880114°W	BCPSS site School site
406	Forest Park High School	Dorchester	9 to 12	Traditional	Choice lottery	3701 Eldorado Avenue	39.3325853°N 76.6897592°W	BCPSS site
450	Frederick Douglass High School	Mondawmin	9 to 12	Traditional	Choice lottery	2301 Gwynns Falls Parkway	39.3147394°N 76.6549423°W	BCPSS site School site
177	George W.F. McMechen High School	Dolfield	9 to 12	Separate public day	Special needs placement	4411 Garrison Boulevard	39.3374248999999°N 76.6832299°W	BCPSS site
333	Independence School Local I High School	Hampden	9 to 12	Charter	Choice lottery	1300 W 36th Street	39.3308923°N 76.6377819°W	BCPSS site
410	Mergenthaler Vocational-Technical High School	Ednor Gardens-Lakeside	9 to 12	Traditional	Entrance criteria	3500 Hillen Road	39.3325566°N 76.5910361999999°W	BCPSS site School site
422	New Era Academy	Cherry Hill	9 to 12	Traditional	Choice lottery, specialized	2700 Seamon Avenue	39.2526559°N 76.6208887°W	BCPSS site School site
875	P-TECH at Carver Vocational-Technical High	Coppin Heights	9 to 12	Traditional	Choice lottery, specialized	2201 Presstman Street	39.3043146°N 76.6526635999999°W	BCPSS site
879	P-TECH at New Era Academy	Cherry Hill	9 to 12	Traditional	Choice lottery, specialized	2700 Seamon Avenue	39.2526559°N 76.6208887°W	BCPSS site
877	P-TECH at Paul Laurence Dunbar High	Dunbar-Broadway	9 to 12	Traditional	Choice lottery, specialized	1400 Orleans Street	39.2954888°N 76.5984740999999°W	BCPSS site
405	Patterson High School	Hopkins Bayview	9 to 12	Traditional	Choice lottery	100 Kane Street	39.2928838°N 76.5377917999999°W	BCPSS site
414	Paul Laurence Dunbar High School	Dunbar-Broadway	9 to 12	Traditional	Entrance criteria, specialized	1400 Orleans Street	39.2954888°N 76.5984740999999°W	BCPSS site
341	The Reach! Partnership School	Clifton Park	9 to 12	Transformation	Choice lottery	2815 Saint Lo Drive	39.3182161°N 76.5849629°W	BCPSS site
419	Reginald F. Lewis High School	Hamilton Hills	9 to 12	Traditional	Choice lottery	6401 Pioneer Drive	39.3655528°N 76.5711972°W	BCPSS site School site
433	Renaissance Academy	Madison Park	9 to 12	Traditional	Choice lottery	1301 McCulloh Street	39.3033242°N 76.628365°W	BCPSS site
855	Success Academy	Hamilton Hills	9 to 12	Alternative	Alternative placement	2201 Pinewood Avenue	39.3657698°N 76.570962°W	BCPSS site
429	Vivien T. Thomas Medical Arts Academy	Franklin Square	9 to 12	Traditional	Choice lottery	100 N Calhoun Street	39.2905805°N 76.6399222999999°W	BCPSS site
407	Western High School	Cross Keys	9 to 12	Traditional	Entrance criteria	4600 Falls Road	39.3471462°N 76.6439335999999°W	BCPSS site School site
858	Youth Opportunity Academy	Sandtown-Winchester	9 to 12	Alternative	Alternative placement	1510 West Lafayette Avenue	39.2990434°N 76.6425798°W	BCPSS site

== Other schools ==
School number	School name	Neighborhood	Grades served	Management type	Enrollment type	Title I	Address	Coordinates	Website
303	Home and Hospital Program	Fairmont	K to 12	Alternative	Alternative placement		2000 Edgewood Street	39.309954°N 76.677904°W	BCPSS site
86	Lakewood Elementary School	Berea	Pre-k to K	Traditional	Neighborhood	Schoolwide	2625 Federal Street	39.3086311°N 76.5806483999999°W	BCPSS site
301	William S. Baer School	Mondawmin	Pre-k to 12	Separate public day	Special needs placement		2001 N Warwick Avenue	39.3108324°N 76.656634°W	BCPSS site School site
