= Coppin =

Coppin or Coppins may refer to:

== People ==
- Daniel Coppin (1771–1822), British artist and art collector
- Fanny Jackson Coppin (1837–1913), African-American educator and missionary
- George Coppin (1819–1906), actor and politician in Australia
- Jean Coppin (c. 1615–c. 1690), French traveller and professional soldier
- Johnny Coppin, English singer/songwriter, composer and broadcaster
- Levi Coppin, (1848–1924), American bishop
- M. E. Thompson Coppin (c. 1878–1940), African-American physician
- Richard Coppin, 17th-century English political and religious writer

Coppins

- Frederick George Coppins (1889–1963), Canadian recipient of the Victoria Cross

=== Fictional people ===
- Tahnee Coppin, in the Australian soap opera Neighbours, played by Anna Jennings-Edquist
- Taj Coppin, in the Australian soap opera Neighbours, played by Jaime Robbie Reyne

== Places ==
- Coppin State University, historically black college in Baltimore, Maryland
- Coppin Academy High School, public high school in Baltimore, Maryland
- Coppin Center, multi-purpose arena in Baltimore, Maryland
- Coppin Heights, Baltimore, a neighborhood in the western part of Baltimore, Maryland
- Coppins, farmhouse in Buckinghamshire, England, used by the royal family
