= A. B. Cosey =

American writer and politician (c.1862–1921)

Alfred Bonito Cosey (c. 1862 – March 20, 1921), better known as A. B. Cosey, was an American writer, politician, recorder of deeds, and lawyer. He was nicknamed the "Negro lawyer of Newark", Cosey hosted the pivotal 1912 meeting in which then-presidential candidate Woodrow Wilson pledged that he would help with the advancement of the Black community. Cosey was disbarred in 1915 by the state of New Jersey. He wrote various publications including The Negro A to Z.

== Life and career ==
Alfred Bonito Cosey was born in c. 1862, in Maryland, his father was from Cuba and mother was from District of Columbia. In 1899, he married Anna S. Bailey in Washington, D.C.

Cosey was the president of the First District Colored Republican club in 1889; president of the newly formed Afro-American League of America in 1889; president of the United Negro Democrats of New Jersey in 1912; and chairman of the Joint Organizational Movement in Brooklyn in 1920.

== Publications ==
- Cosey, A. B. (1914). American and English Law on Titles of Record, 1535–1911. New York City, NY.
- Cosey, A. B. (1897). The Negro from A to Z. Washington, D.C.: Press of Robert Lewis Pendleton. LCCN 91898156.

== See also ==
- G. F. Bragg
- B. G. Brawley
- Delilah Beasley
- J. W. Cromwell
- L. J. Coppin
- William Still
