= Cyrus Jones =

American football player (born 1993)

No. 24, 41, 27
- Positions: Cornerback, return specialist

Personal information
- Born: November 29, 1993 (age 32); Baltimore, Maryland, U.S.
- Listed height: 5 ft 10 in (1.78 m)
- Listed weight: 200 lb (91 kg)

Career information
- High school: Gilman School (Baltimore)
- College: Alabama (2012–2015)
- NFL draft: 2016: 2nd round, 60th overall pick

Career history
- New England Patriots (2016–2017); Baltimore Ravens (2018)*; New England Patriots (2018); Baltimore Ravens (2018–2019); Denver Broncos (2019)
- * Offseason or practice squad member only

Awards and highlights
- Super Bowl champion (LI); CFP national champion (2016); BCS national champion (2013); 2015 Cotton Bowl Classic Defensive MVP; Second-team All-SEC (2014)

Career NFL statistics
- Total tackles: 19
- Fumble recoveries: 2
- Total return yards: 655
- Total touchdowns: 1
- Stats at Pro Football Reference

Cyrus Diego Jones Jr. (born November 29, 1993) is an American former professional football player who was a cornerback and return specialist in the National Football League (NFL). He played college football for the Alabama Crimson Tide and was selected by the New England Patriots in the second round of the 2016 NFL draft. He was also a member of the Baltimore Ravens and Denver Broncos.

== Early life ==
Jones was born in Baltimore and attended elementary school at the Leith Walk Elementary/Middle School in northeast Baltimore. He played football and baseball in the Northwood neighborhood, also in northeast Baltimore. Jones attended Gilman School in Baltimore, Maryland. He played cornerback, wide receiver, and running back for the Greyhounds. As a senior, he had 2,365 all-purpose yards and 24 touchdowns on offense and five interceptions on defense. Jones committed to the University of Alabama to play college football.

== College career ==
Jones played at Alabama from 2012 to 2015. Jones played wide receiver as a freshman in 2012, catching four passes for 51 yards. Prior to his sophomore year in 2013, he moved to cornerback. He played in 11 games with five starts that season and had 25 tackles, two interceptions and one sack. As a junior in 2014, he played in all 14 games and had 46 tackles and three interceptions. As a senior, he played in all 15 games and had 37 tackles and two interceptions. He also was Alabama's punt returner, returning 42 punts for 530 yards and four touchdowns. Jones was the Defensive MVP of the 2015 Cotton Bowl after intercepting a redzone pass from Connor Cook with 18 seconds left in the second half to halt Michigan State's momentum and preserve Alabama's eventual 38–0 shutout of the Spartans. In addition, he returned a punt for a touchdown in the victory.

=== Statistics ===
==== Defensive statistics ====
Year	School	Conf	Class	Pos	G	Tackles					Interceptions				Fumbles			
Year	School	Conf	Class	Pos	G	Solo	Ast	Tot	Loss	Sk	Int	Yds	TD	PD	FR	Yds	TD	FF
2012	Alabama	SEC	FR	WR	11	0	0	0	0	0	0	0	0	0	0	0	0	0
2013	Alabama	SEC	SO	UT	9	18	7	25	1.5	1.0	2	1	0	5	0	0	0	0
2014	Alabama	SEC	JR	DB	14	36	8	44	2.0	0.0	3	27	0	13	1	13	1	2
2015	Alabama	SEC	SR	DB	15	29	8	37	4.0	0.0	2	21	0	7	1	0	0	2
Career	Alabama					83	23	106	7.5	1.0	7	28	0	25	2	13	1	4

==== Return statistics ====
Year	School	Conf	Class	Pos	G	Kick returns			Punt returns		
Year	School	Conf	Class	Pos	G	Ret	Yds	TD	Ret	Yds	TD
2012	Alabama	SEC	FR	WR	11	10	250	0	8	61	0
2013	Alabama	SEC	SO	UT	9	0	0	0	0	0	0
2014	Alabama	SEC	JR	DB	14	4	77	0	4	82	0
2015	Alabama	SEC	SR	DB	15	42	530	4	1	24	0
Career	Alabama					56	857	4	13	167	0

== Professional career ==
Pre-draft measurables
Height	Weight	Arm length	Hand span	Wingspan	40-yard dash	10-yard split	20-yard split	20-yard shuttle	Three-cone drill	Vertical jump	Broad jump	Bench press
5 ft 9 7/8 in (1.77 m)	197 lb (89 kg)	31 3/8 in (0.80 m)	9 1/8 in (0.23 m)	6 ft 1 3/4 in (1.87 m)	4.49 s	1.55 s	2.62 s	4.21 s	6.71 s	33 in (0.84 m)	9 ft 8 in (2.95 m)	10 reps
All values from NFL Scouting Combine

=== New England Patriots (first stint) ===
Jones was selected by the New England Patriots in the second round (60th overall) of the 2016 NFL draft. Jones finished his rookie regular season with seven tackles, no pass deflections, and no interceptions. Jones was an occasional return specialist; his returns gained 180 yards, but he also fumbled five times. He played in 10 games during the regular season. On February 5, 2017, Jones's Patriots appeared in Super Bowl LI. He was inactive for the game as the Patriots defeated the Atlanta Falcons by a score of 34–28 in overtime.

Prior to the 2017 season, Jones switched to jersey number 41 and gave 24 to newcomer Stephon Gilmore. In the Patriots' final preseason game of 2017, Jones suffered a torn ACL and partially torn meniscus and was ruled out for the season. He was officially placed on injured reserve on September 2, 2017.

On September 1, 2018, Jones was waived by the Patriots.

=== Baltimore Ravens (first stint) ===
On September 3, 2018, Jones was signed to the practice squad of the Baltimore Ravens.

=== New England Patriots (second stint) ===
On September 19, 2018, the Patriots re-signed Jones off Baltimore's practice squad. He was waived on October 6, 2018.

=== Baltimore Ravens (second stint) ===
On October 8, 2018, Jones was claimed off waivers by the Ravens. In Week 12, Jones returned a punt for a 70-yard touchdown in a 34–17 win over the Oakland Raiders, earning him American Football Conference Special Teams Player of the Week. He was released on November 12, 2019.

=== Denver Broncos ===
On November 13, 2019, Jones was claimed off waivers by the Denver Broncos. He was placed on the reserve/non-football injury list on November 26, 2019.

== Personal life ==
Jones earned the nickname "Clamp Clampington", which was given for his shutdown corner abilities, while at Alabama.
