= James Mosher Elementary School =

Location
- 2400 W. Mosher Street; Baltimore, Maryland 21216
- Coordinates: 39°17′59″N 76°39′20″W

Information
- School type: Public
- Motto: “Where We Do Everything with Excellence!”
- School district: Baltimore City Public Schools
- Superintendent: Dr. Sonja Brookins Santelises [CEO]
- School number: 144
- Principal: Denisha Logan
- Grades: Pre-k–5
- Enrollment: 347 (2011)
- Area: Urban

James Mosher Elementary School is located in West Baltimore in the Bridgeview/Greenlawn neighborhood. According to their website, the school's philosophy is "based upon the belief that all children can learn given the appropriate opportunities."

== History ==
James Mosher Elementary School began development in 1923 with the purchase of a 7-acre tract for $30,000. Residents hoped a new school could relieve overcrowding for nearby schools. Unfortunately for local residents, the project was beset with delays and by July 1929 the funds originally appropriated for the new school were used instead to build Gwynn Falls Junior High. In the six year interim, the neighborhood grew from 350 to over 500 dwellings and students attending overcrowded schools at Payson and Saratoga and Poplar Grove and Lafayette Avenues were forced to study in portable structures.

In December 1930, the Baltimore School Board received a permit for the erection of three portable school buildings and classes started at the new school in February 1931 with plans to construct an elementary school building soon after. In August 1931, the school board finally appropriated $90,000 for the construction of School No. 80. The successful bid on the contract for construction of the new building came from Charles L. Stockhausen.

Beginning in 1899, Charles L. Stockhausen served as a general contractor throughout in Baltimore with projects including the General Baking Company (1925) at North Avenue and Harford Road and the Fairfield Farms Dairy Company Building (1927) at Front, Exeter and Colvin Streets. Under the management of general manager Charles Albert Cummins, the firm's extensive work on public school buildings includes School No. 83 (1906) at Lakewood Avenue and Oliver Street, School No. 96 (1906) at Pulaski and Ramsay Streets, a 1912 addition to School No. 13 at Patterson Park Avenue and McElderry Street, Western High School, and the Polytechnic Institute on North Avenue, Northeastern Junior High School (1922) in Clifton Park, City College, and many others. The firm continued through the late 1930s but ended following Stockhausen's death in November 1943.

The school remained a segregated white school through the late 1940s. The rapid racial transition of the West Baltimore, however, created significant challenges for the management of Baltimore's still segregated public school system during the early 1950s. At the beginning of the 1952 school year, school administrators had only anticipated 370 students at School No. 144 but, surprised by the changing neighborhood had to manage a near overwhelming enrollment of 608 students. The year following School No. 144 was still described as having enrollment of 900 students and an expectation of continued growth.

In response to the rapid growth, the school administration proposed a large addition with a contract soon awarded to Philip Vizzini & Son, Inc. Phillip Vizzini established his construction firm in 1918 and attended the Maryland Institute night school earning a certificate in architecture in 1920. In 1945, Vizzini expanded and incorporated as Philip Vizzini & Son Inc. The firm specialized in school construction and—by the end of the firm at Vizzini's retirement in 1972—the firm had completed 42 schools in Baltimore, Baltimore County and Anne Arundel County.
