= Bard High School Early College Baltimore =

Charter high school in Baltimore, Maryland, USA

Location
- 2801 N Dukeland Street; Baltimore, Maryland 21216; United States; 39°19′5″N 76°39′51.8″W

Information
- School type: Public charter
- Founded: 2015
- School district: Baltimore City Public Schools
- School number: 362
- Principal: Arnetta Young
- Grades: 9–12
- Enrollment: 482 (2019)
- Area: Urban
- Affiliation: Bard College
- Website: Website

Bard High School Early College (BHSEC) Baltimore is a public contract high school located in the Hanlon Longwood neighborhood of Baltimore, Maryland, United States. Opened in 2015, BHSEC Baltimore became the seventh branch of the larger Bard High School Early College program, a group of high schools established in partnership with the private liberal arts college Bard College.

Students at BHSEC are able to earn a tuition-free associate's degree in their final two years of school, in addition to their high school diploma. The school also maintains an agreement with Maryland's public colleges and universities to accept credits earned towards a bachelor's degree. It also has made credit transfer agreements with a few private schools, including Goucher College. Students can earn up to 60 credits under the partnership with Bard College. The school's admissions process differs from the majority of high schools in Baltimore City Public Schools as student applications are not judged on the basis of middle school grades, attendance and assessments, but only on the basis of an interview and student essay.

The school is one of several smaller programs now located within the campus of the former William H. Lemmel Middle School, a traditional public school that was closed in 2010. Bard now shares the building with two other charters: the Angela Y. Davis Leadership Academy and the ConneXions School for the Arts.
