= Garwyn Oaks, Baltimore =

Garwyn Oaks
- neighborhood statistical area
- Location within Baltimore
- Coordinates: 39.316105°N 76.679099°W
- Country: United States
- State: Maryland
- City: Baltimore

Area
  - Total: 0.163 sq mi (0.42 km^{2})
  - Land: 0.163 sq mi (0.42 km^{2})

Population (2009)
  - Total: 1,572
  - Density: 9,640/sq mi (3,720/km^{2})
- Time zone: UTC-5 (Eastern)
  - Summer (DST): UTC-4 (EDT)
- ZIP code: 21216
- Area code: 410, 443, and 667

Garwyn Oaks is a neighborhood in the Northwest District of Baltimore, located between the neighborhoods of Windsor Hills and Hanlon Longwood. The boundaries of its somewhat rectangular shape are marked by Woodhaven Avenue (north), Gwynns Falls Parkway (south), Garrison Boulevard (east) and Chelsea Terrace (west).

The land now occupied by the Garwyn Oaks community was originally part of George Repold Vickers' Mount Alto estate. Many of the more than 300 houses in Garwyn Oaks are wood frame single-family detached homes and shingle style row houses that were built in the early 1900s. A diverse population of blue and white collar workers, self-employed workers, professionals and retired people live in these houses.

== Demographics ==
The population of Garwyn Oaks is almost exclusively African American. Median household income for 2009 was estimated at $28,893, significantly less than the citywide median of $38,772. An estimated 32.8 percent of the neighborhood's residents lived on income below the poverty level in 2009, compared with the citywide rate of 22.9 percent.

== Public services ==
LocalLink 80 (BaltimoreLink) stops along Garrison Boulevard on the neighborhood's eastern edge as it travels between Sinai Hospital and Downtown Baltimore.

William Mcgill Park is located on the south side of Piedmont Avenue between Chelsea Terrace (west) and Allendale Road (east).

Garwyn Oaks Northwest Housing Resource Center, Inc., located at 2300 Garrison Boulevard, is a certified housing counseling organization.

== See also ==
List of Baltimore neighborhoods
