= Maurice Tyler =

American football player (born 1950)

No. 42, 23, 25, 27, 39
- Position: Defensive back

Personal information
- Born: July 19, 1950 (age 76); Karnack, Texas, U.S.
- Listed height: 6 ft 0 in (1.83 m)
- Listed weight: 188 lb (85 kg)

Career information
- High school: Mergenthaler Tech (MD)
- College: Baltimore JC (1968–1969); Morgan State (1970–1971)
- NFL draft: 1972: 10th round, 235th overall pick

Career history
- Buffalo Bills (1972); Denver Broncos (1973–1974); San Diego Chargers (1975); Detroit Lions (1976); New York Jets (1977); New York Giants (1978); Ottawa Rough Riders (1980); Chicago Blitz (1983); Denver Gold (1983); San Antonio Gunslingers (1984)

Career NFL statistics
- Interceptions: 5
- Fumble recoveries: 5
- Sacks: 1
- Stats at Pro Football Reference

Maurice Michael Tyler (born July 19, 1950) is an American former professional football player who was a defensive back in the National Football League (NFL) for the Buffalo Bills, Denver Broncos, San Diego Chargers, Detroit Lions, New York Jets, and New York Giants. He also spent the 1983 season with the Chicago Blitz and the Denver Gold and the 1984 season with the San Antonio Gunslingers of the United States Football League (USFL).

== Background ==
Tyler grew up in Baltimore and graduated from Mergenthaler Vocational Technical Senior High School. He played college football at Morgan State University.
Tyler is the athletic director at W. E. B. Du Bois High School in Baltimore.
