= Frankford, Baltimore =

Neighborhood in Baltimore

Frankford
- Neighborhood of Baltimore
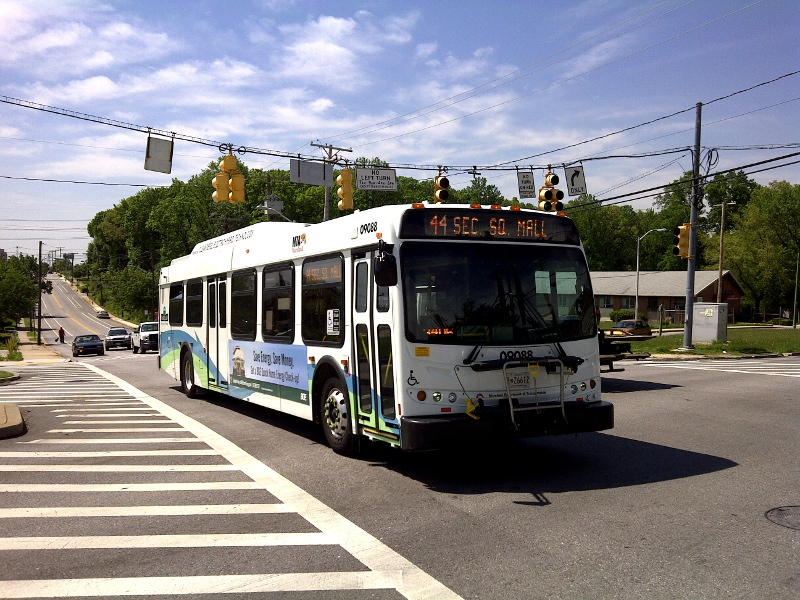
- MTA bus passes through intersection of Frankford Avenue and Sinclair Lane in Frankford, Baltimore

- Location within Baltimore Location within Maryland Location within the United States
- Coordinates: 39°19′42″N 76°32′45″W
- Country: United States
- State: Maryland
- City: Baltimore
- City Council: District 2

Area
  - Total: 2.1216 sq mi (5.495 km^{2})

Population (2020)
  - Total: 17,966
  - Density: 8,468/sq mi (3,270/km^{2})
- Time zone: UTC−5 (Eastern)
  - Summer (DST): UTC−4 (EDT)
- ZIP Codes: 21206
- Area Codes: 410, 443, 667

Frankford is a neighborhood in northeast Baltimore. Frankford is the most populous of the city's designated neighborhoods, with over 17,000 residents.

== Geography ==
Frankford is bounded by Belair Road, White Avenue, and Hazelwood Avenue to the north; Moravia Park Drive and I-895 to the south; the eastern city limits, Whitby Road, Arizona Avenue, Moores Run Drive, and Moores Run to the east; and Seidel Avenue and Bowleys Lane to the west. Adjacent neighborhoods are Glenham-Belford (north), Cedmont (northeast), Cedonia (east), Pulaski Industrial Area (south), Armistead Gardens (southwest), Orchard Ridge (southwest), Lower Herring Run Park (southwest), Parkside (west), Belair-Edison (west), Arcadia (northwest), Wilson Heights (northwest), and Waltherson (northwest). The unincorporated communities of Overlea and Rosedale in Baltimore County are also adjacent to Frankford to the east.

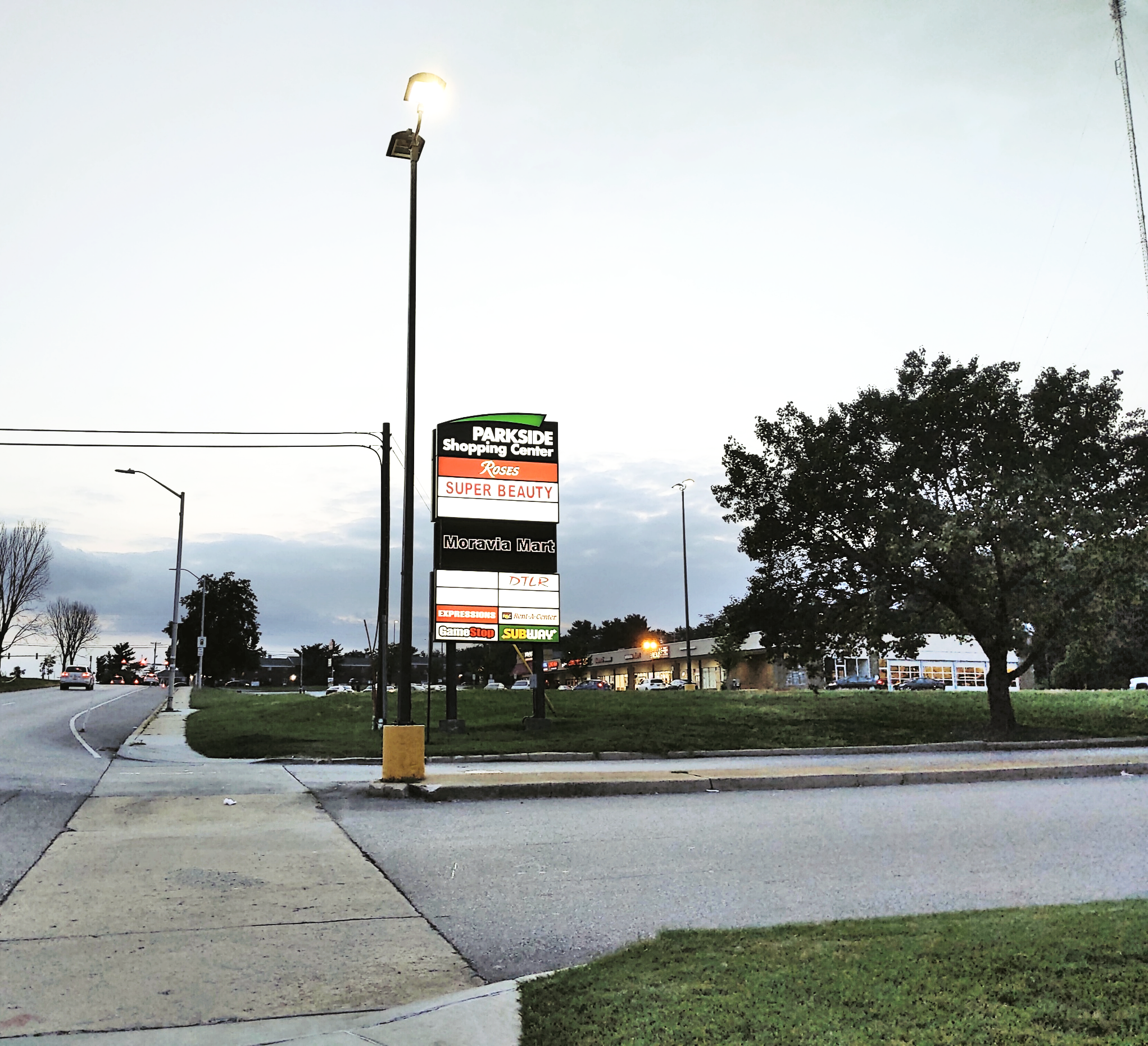
Sign for Parkside Shopping Center near Moravia Road & Sinclair Lane in Frankford, Baltimore

== History ==
During the 19th century, the area around Belair Road and Moravia Road was a suburban neighborhood known as Gardenville which was inhabited by first- and second-generation Polish and Italian Americans. The neighborhood's housing stock differed from those south of it, consisting of single-family homes rather than rowhouses which were prevalent throughout the core of the Baltimore City. The Gardenville name is still used for some of the neighborhood's place names, for example, Gardenville Park and Ride is a connecting bus stop on Belair Road served by the Maryland Transit Administration.

Today, Frankford has densified and some of what were once single-family houses have now been converted into multi-family units. The area remains predominantly residential with Belair Road along its edge serving as a retail corridor for the neighborhoods which converge along it.

== Notable residents ==
- Brandon Scott, mayor of Baltimore since 2020
