= Graceland Park, Baltimore =

Graceland Park
- Neighborhood of Baltimore
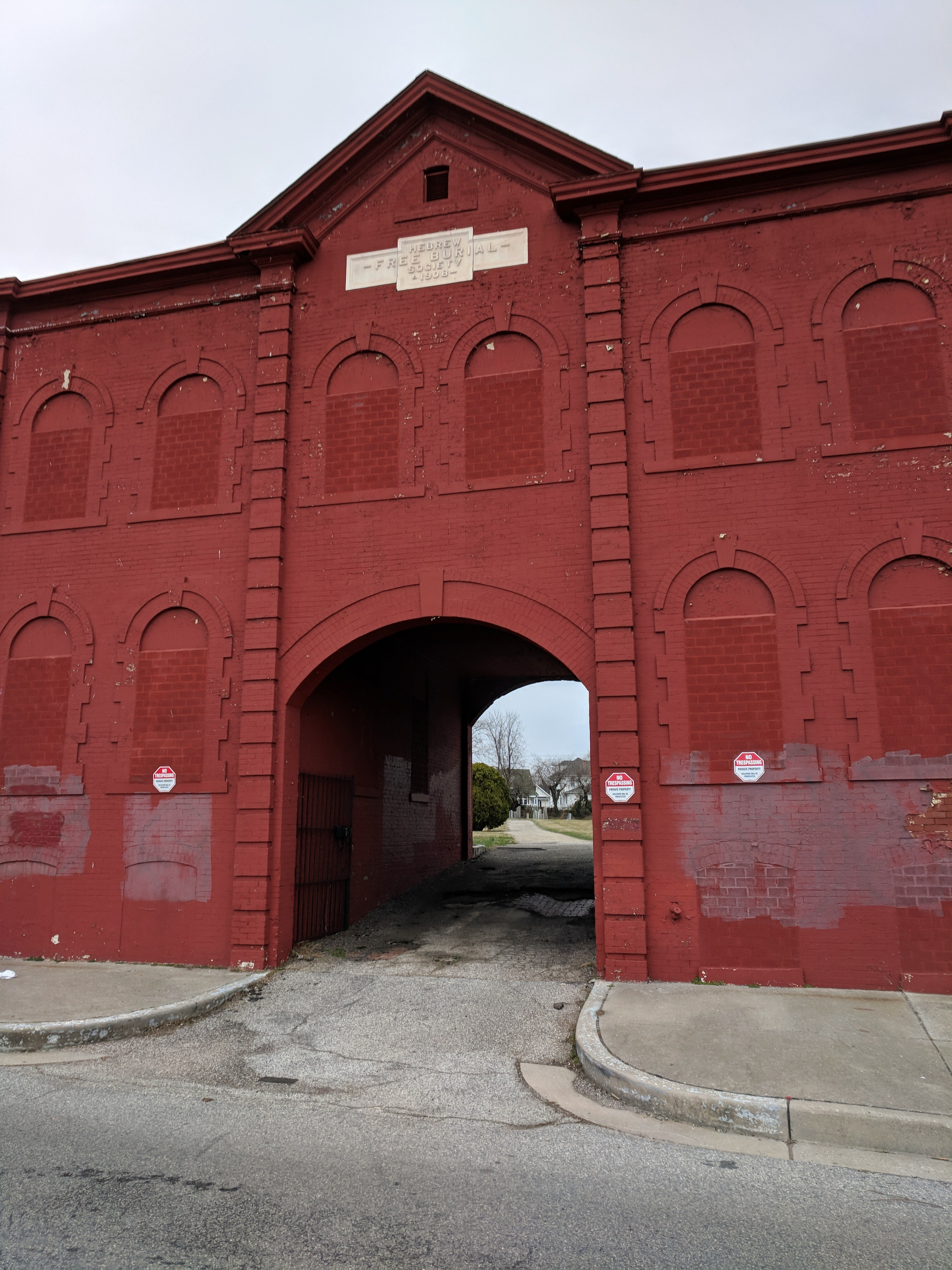
- Hebrew Cemetery at German Hill Road in Graceland Park, Baltimore

- Location within Baltimore
- Coordinates: 39°16′55.55″N 76°31′58″W
- Country: United States
- State: Maryland
- City: Baltimore
- Time zone: UTC-5 (Eastern)
  - Summer (DST): UTC-4 (EDT)
- Area code: 410, 443, and 667

Graceland Park is a neighborhood in southeastern Baltimore, Maryland, United States, located adjacent to the O'Donnell Heights neighborhood. The neighborhood's western extreme is Gusryan Street, and it abuts the Baltimore City-Baltimore County line on the east. The Baltimore County portion, Harbor View, is adjacent to the community of Dundalk.
