= Dunbar-Broadway, Baltimore =

Neighborhood in Baltimore

Dunbar-Broadway
- Neighborhood of Baltimore
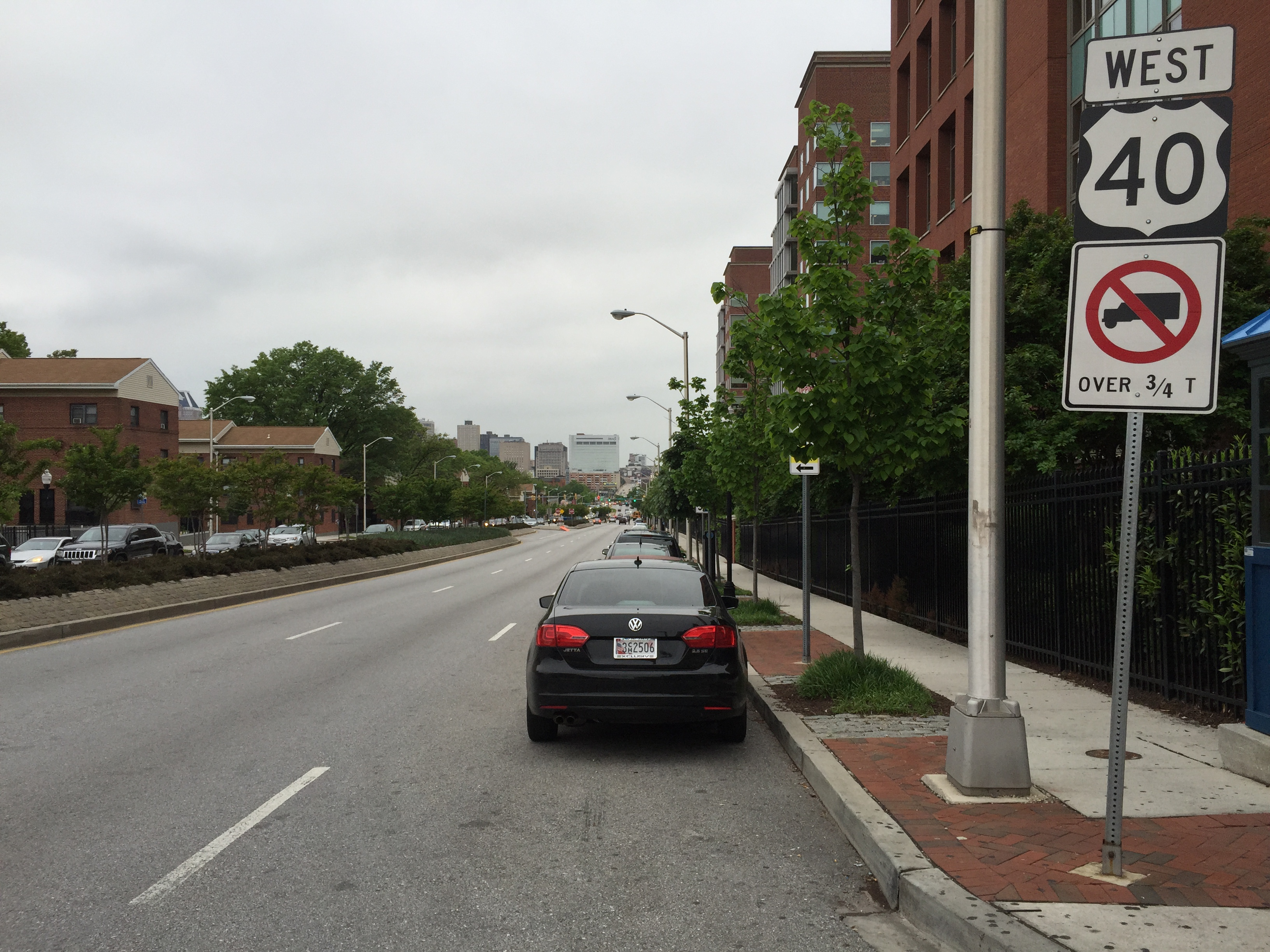
- View west on Orleans Street in Dunbar-Broadway, Baltimore, with Johns Hopkins Medical Campus on the right and residential buildings on the left

- Location within Baltimore Location within Maryland Location within the United States
- Coordinates: 39.2954°N 76.5943°W
- Country: United States
- State: Maryland
- City: Baltimore

Area
  - Total: 0.0171 sq mi (0.044 km^{2})

Population (2010)
  - Total: 889
- Time zone: UTC−5 (Eastern)
  - Summer (DST): UTC−4 (EDT)
- ZIP Codes: 21205, 21231
- Area Codes: 410, 443, 667

Dunbar-Broadway is a neighborhood in southeast Baltimore, Maryland, USA. The area includes part of the Johns Hopkins Hospital campus, and recent development in the area has been driven by its proximity to the institution.
