= Mergenthaler Vocational-Technical High School =

School in Baltimore, Maryland, US

Coordinates: 39°19′56″N 76°35′28″W

Location
- 3500 Hillen Road; Baltimore, Maryland 21218; United States

Information
- School type: Public, Vocational-Technical, Magnet
- Motto: "Reimagining Excellence"
- Founded: 1953
- School district: Baltimore City Public Schools
- Superintendent: Sonja Santelises [CEO]
- Area trustee: Janice McCoy
- School number: 410
- NCES School ID: 240048001455
- Principal: Dr. Jermaine Skinner
- Grades: 9–12
- Enrollment: 1,832 (2021-22)
- Area: Urban
- Colors: Gold, Royal Blue
- Mascot: Mustangs
- Website: www.baltimorecityschools.org/o/mervo

Mergenthaler Vocational-Technical High School (commonly referred to as "Mervo" or "MerVo-Tech") is a public high school in Baltimore, Maryland, United States. It is one of the two premiere vocational-technical high schools in the city, the other being Carver Vocational-Technical High School on Presstman Street in West Baltimore.

Mervo was established in 1953 as a vocational-technical school. It is named after Ottmar Mergenthaler (1854-1899), the inventor of the Linotype typesetting machine, which revolutionized the printing and newspaper industries.

According to its website, the school aims to "educate students to function in an industrial and challenging technological society." All students must apply and meet certain standards of entrance criteria for acceptance to the school.

As of 2024, U.S. News & World Report designates Mergenthaler Vocation-Technical High School eligible to display a U.S. News Best High School Award Badge, ranking Mervo 125th within Maryland. In 2012, The Mervo Mustangs Alumni Association was established.

Mervo offers 22 state-approved trades courses, including: Accounting and Finance, Allied Health, Auto Body and Repair, Automotive Technology, Business Management, Carpentry, Childcare, CISCO Networking Academy, Commercial Baking, Computer Science, Cosmetology, Cybersecurity, Electrical Construction, Food Services, Graphic Arts and Printing, Law and Leadership, Masonry, Plumbing, Project Lead The Way (Pre-Engineering), Teacher Academy, and Welding.

Mervo also has an accelerated curriculum, which offers both Advanced Placement (AP) courses and Honors Classes in all areas of education.

== Graduation rates ==
As of 2024, Mervo has a graduation rate of 78%.

== Football field ==
The football field was named Art Modell Field at Mervo in honor of Art Modell, the longtime owner of the former Cleveland Browns professional football team franchise in the National Football League (NFL), which later relocated in 1995 to become the Baltimore Ravens. The field's renovation was spearheaded by The Ravens All Community Team Foundation, successor Ravens owner Steve Bisciotti, CB Chris McAlister, and the NFL Youth Football Fund. The $1 million project includes installation of a Sportexe turf field (like that at M&T Bank Stadium at Camden Yards), additional bleachers on the home/away sides, a ticket booth, and upgrades to the restrooms and concession stand. Serving as the primary home to the Mergenthaler Vo-Tech High School football team (the "Mustangs"), the stadium will also host the nearby Northwood Youth Football league and the Baltimore Nighthawks of the Independent Women's Football League.

== Extracurricular activities ==
Mervo hosts over 28 after-school sports and clubs for students, including:

- Cheerleading
- Choir
- Student Government
- Badminton
- Baseball
- Cross Country
- Football
- Basketball

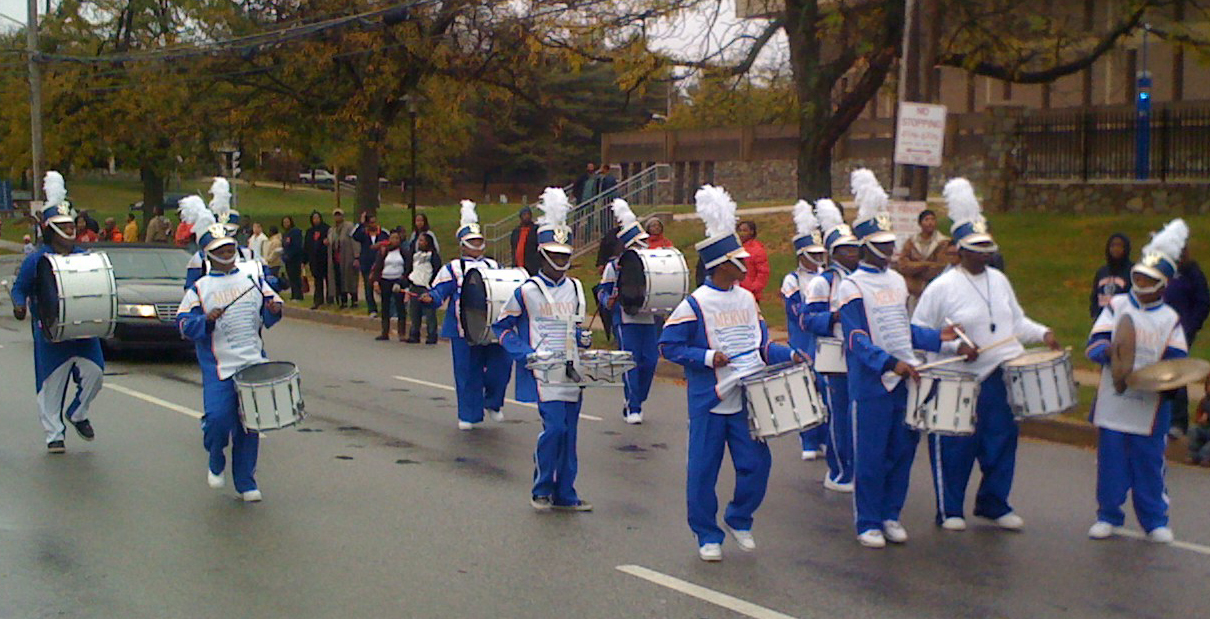
Mervo drumline at the 2008 Morgan State University Homecoming Parade.

- Girls Basketball
- Lacrosse
- Soccer
- Softball
- Swimming
- Track & Field
- Volleyball
- Wrestling
- Dance
- Drama
- Band
- Majorette

== Championships ==
Mervo has won several athletic championships against other schools, recently entering into the city conversation as a football powerhouse after reeling several city titles and a playoffs appearance from 2013 to 2016. In addition, Mervo is historically a Track & Field and Cross Country hub, with a massive amount of MSA A & B Conference Regular Season and Championship Meet titles. When Baltimore City public schools were entered into the MPSSA to compete with county public schools, their dominance continued. Mervo Track boasts the only State Titles in school history in 1995, 1996, and 1998. Led for decades by Coach Fred Hendricks, Mervo was always in the conversation for championships and on the national stage, with stellar Penn Relay performances.

Mervo Football

- Varsity Vo-Tech Bowl:(2010, 2012, 2013, 2014)
- JV Baltimore City Championships: (1984,1994,1996,2012)
- Mervo Varsity Baltimore City Championship:

(1975, 2014*Undefeated, 2015)

- Maryland 4A/3A State Champions: 2021, 2023

Mervo Baseball

- States:(1996,1997) *Regionals:(1996,1997) *City:(1996, 1997)

Mervo Wrestling

- State:(2009) *Regionals:(2006, 2009, 2012, 2013, 2014) *City:(2006, 2009, 2011, 2012, 2013, 2014)

Mervo Girls Basketball

- JV Baltimore City Championships:(2012, 2013) *Varsity City Championships:(2012, 2013)

Mervo Basketball

- JV Baltimore City Championship:(2012) *Varsity City Championship:(2012) Regionals:(2012)

Mervo Tennis

- City:(2012) *Regionals:(2012) *State:(2012)
- Mervo Step Team Diamond Divas: *Undefeated Baltimore City Champions(2007-2008)

Cheerleading Championship(2012)

Mervo Cross Country

- MSA C Conference Championship 1991
- MSA B Conference Championship 1993
- Baltimore City Championship 1993-1997
- Regional Champion 1994 & 1996

== Mergenthaler crest ==
The official Mergenthaler crest for 10th-12th graders is a blue and gold cogwheel, which is represents both the school's original printing heritage and the modern industries for which Mervo prepares its students. The official Mergenthaler Vo-Tech uniform shirt for 9th graders is a gold shirt with a blue cogwheel.

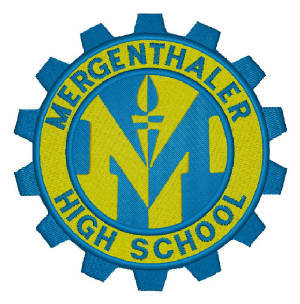

== School song ==
The Mergenthaler School song was penned by the president of the senior class of 1955. The song is performed by the Mergenthaler Mass Choir before each school assembly, following the playing and singing of the national anthem of the United States with the "Star-Spangled Banner" - which was composed in Baltimore by Francis Scott Key during the British attack on Fort McHenry in the Battle of Baltimore, September 12-13-14th, 1814, during the War of 1812.

== Notable alumni ==
- Bossman, rapper
- James Carter, Olympic athlete
- Marcus Hatten, former NBA player, 2006 top scorer in the Israel Basketball Premier League
- Brandon M. Scott, Mayor of Baltimore City
- Sisqo, R&B singer
- Maurice Tyler, former NFL defensive back
