= Riverside, Baltimore =

Riverside
- Neighborhood of Baltimore
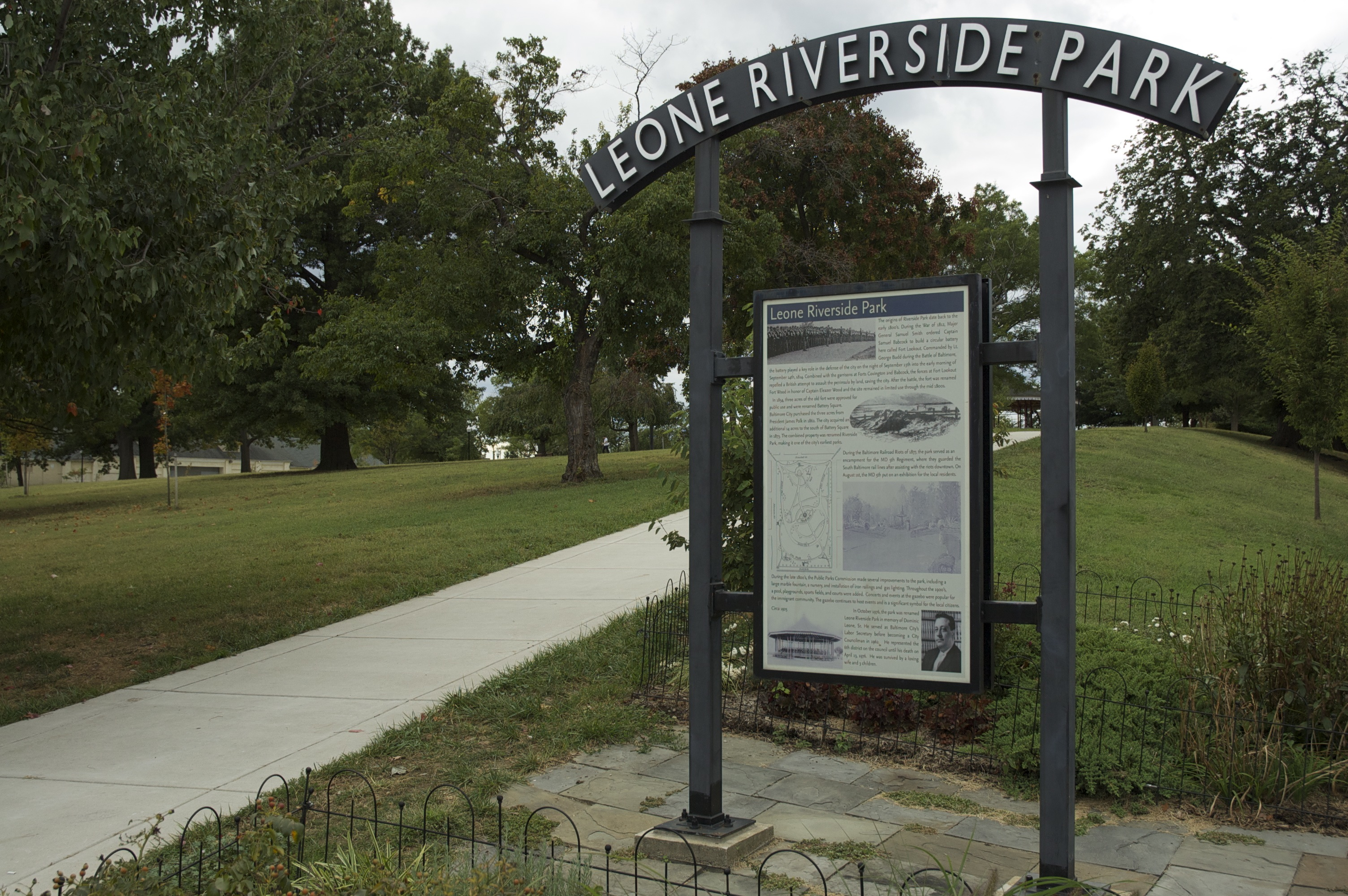
- Riverside Park
- Interactive map of Riverside
- Country: United States
- State: Maryland
- City: Baltimore
- Time zone: UTC-5 (Eastern)
  - Summer (DST): EDT
- ZIP code: 21230
- Area code: 410, 443, and 667
- Riverside Historic District
- U.S. National Register of Historic Places
- U.S. Historic district
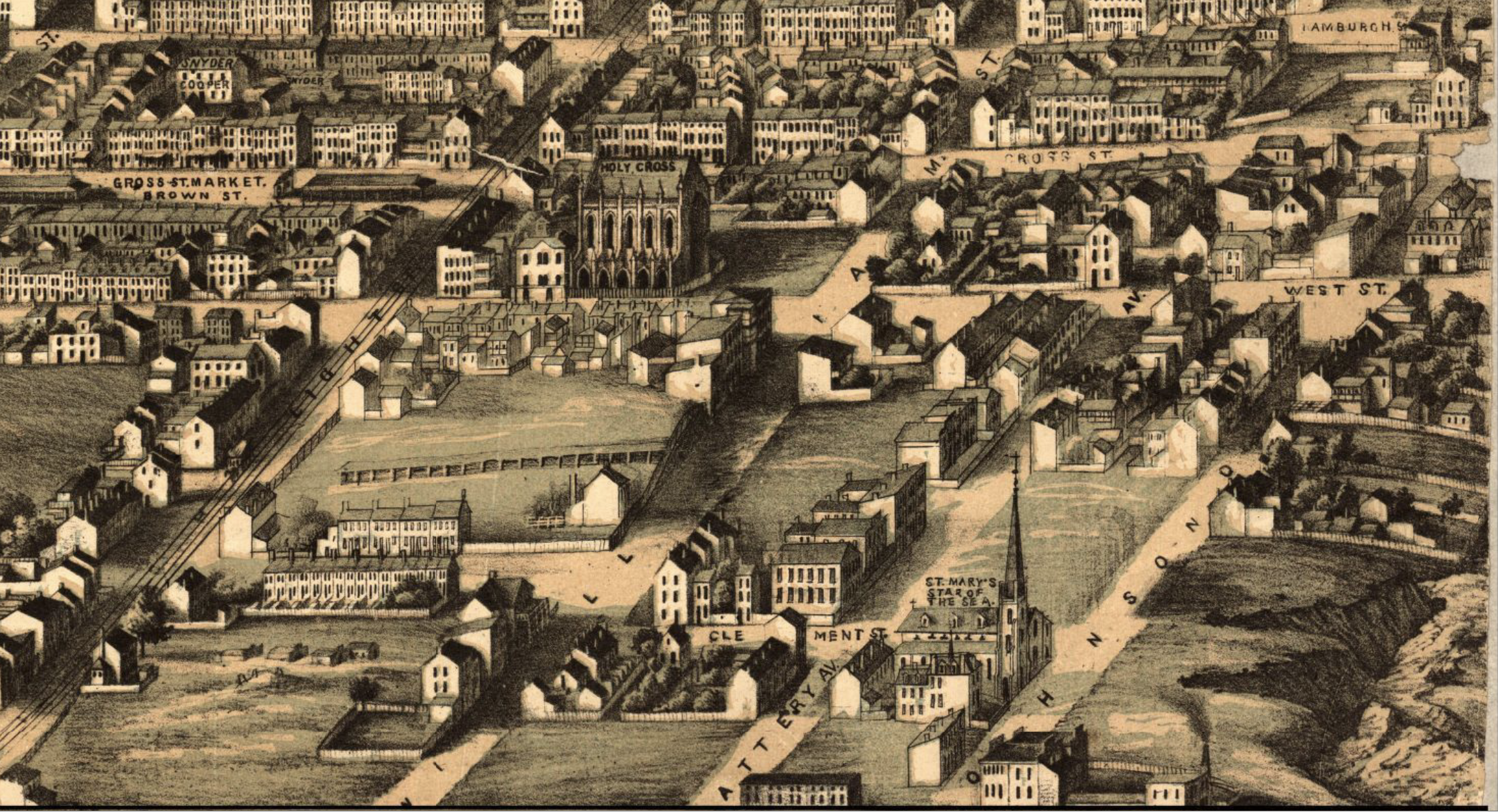
- Bird's eye view map of Riverside, Baltimore in 1869

- Location within Baltimore Location within Maryland Location within the United States
- Location: Bounded by Race St from W. S to Winder, E. to Webster, N. to Heath, E. to Boyle & N. to Fort then W. to Marshall..., Baltimore, Maryland
- Coordinates: 39°16′13″N 76°36′33″W
- Area: 190 acres (77 ha)
- Built: 1845-1910
- Built by: Multiple Builders
- Architectural style: Greek Revival, Late Victorian
- NRHP reference No.: 08000358
- Added to NRHP: April 30, 2008

Riverside is a neighborhood in Baltimore, Maryland, United States that lies just to the south of the city's Federal Hill, Baltimore. The neighborhood is centered around Riverside Park (Baltimore) and includes the Baltimore Museum of Industry. The southwest portion of Riverside corresponds to the Port Covington district under major development, which currently houses The Baltimore Sun, the Under Armour Waterfront HQ Campus, as well as the Cruise Maryland Terminal of the Port of Baltimore. Riverside is registered as Riverside Historic District (Baltimore, Maryland) on the National Register of Historic Places.
