= Edmondson Avenue Historic District =

Historic district in Maryland, United States

- U.S. National Register of Historic Places
- U.S. Historic district
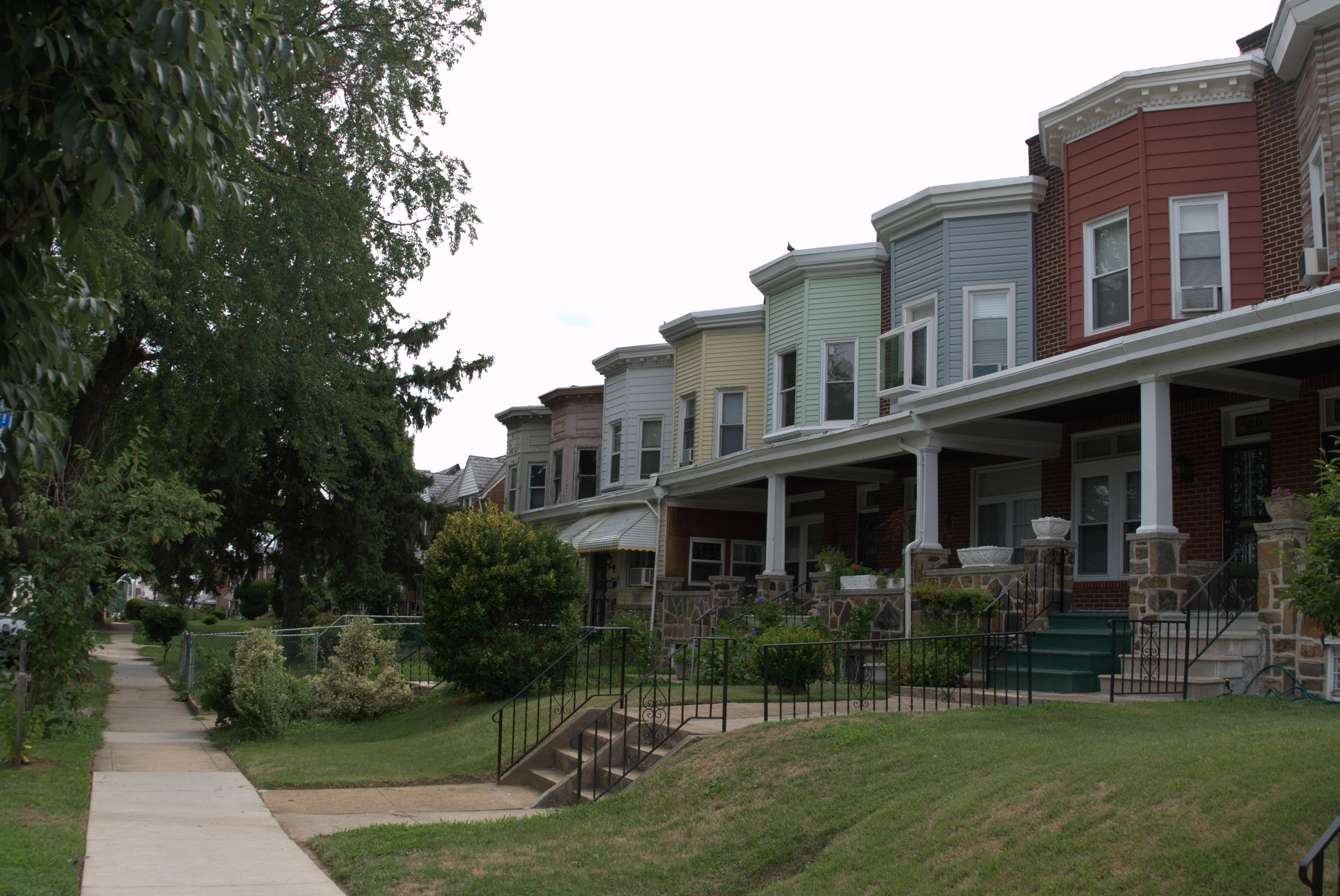
- Row houses in the 700 block of Whitmore Avenue

- Location within Baltimore Location within Maryland Location within the United States
- Location: Winchester St., Braddish Ave. north of Edmondson Ave., Edmondson Ave. west of Braddish Ave., Franklintown Rd. north of W. Franklin St., Baltimore, Maryland
- Coordinates: 39°17′53″N 76°39′47″W
- Area: 160 acres (65 ha)
- Built: c. 1900
- Architect: Multiple
- NRHP reference No.: 10001084
- Added to NRHP: December 27, 2010

The Edmondson Avenue Historic District encompasses several neighborhoods on the west side of Baltimore, Maryland. The area was developed primarily between 1900 and 1940, radiating from the streetcar line that ran along Edmondson Avenue, an east–west thoroughfare. It includes significant portions of the Evergreen Lawn, Bridgeview/Greenlawn, Rosemont, and Midtown-Edmondson neighborhoods, including hundreds of buildings, many of them residential rowhouses. Although initially populated by European-Americans, the neighborhood population became predominantly African-American in the 20 years after World War II, and was a center of civil rights activism and community organizing.

The district was added to the National Register of Historic Places in 2010.
