= Coppin Heights, Baltimore =

Coppin Heights
- Neighborhood of Baltimore
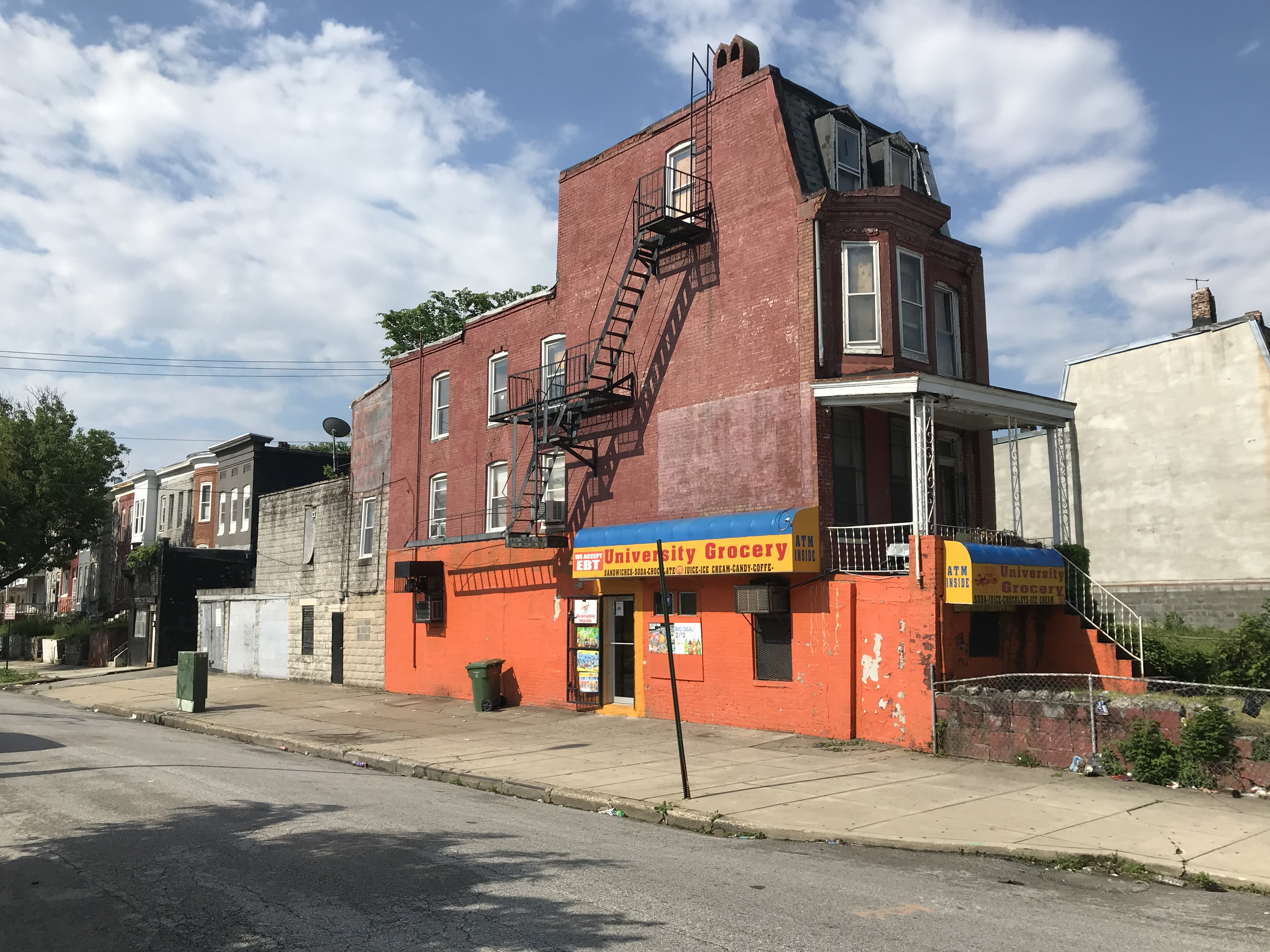
- Corner grocery store named for its proximity to Coppin State University on the 2700 block of W. North Avenue, Coppin Heights, Baltimore

- Location within Baltimore Location within Maryland Location within the United States
- Coordinates: 39°18′25″N 76°39′26″W
- Country: United States
- State: Maryland
- City: Baltimore
- City Council: District 7
- Time zone: UTC−5 (Eastern)
  - Summer (DST): UTC−4 (EDT)
- ZIP Codes: 21216
- Area Codes: 410, 443, 667

Coppin Heights is a neighborhood in West Baltimore, Maryland, located south of North Avenue (Rt. 40), west of N. Smallwood Street, and east of N. Dukeland Street. The community, which includes Carver Vocational-Technical High School and Wilbur H. Waters Park, has been known by several names throughout its history. Beginning around 1910, it was called Easterwood Park, after the nearby park of the same name was created. The area more recently was informally known as Ash-Co-East, likely derived from its approximate boundaries along Route 40, stretching from Ashburton Street in the west, through the Coppin area, to the Easterwood neighborhood at Smallwood Street. In 1989, the neighborhood was officially renamed Coppin Heights in honor of Fanny Jackson Coppin, a pioneering Black educator.

A significant portion of the neighborhood is/was part of the "Coppin Heights/Easterwood Park Historic District" (Maryland Historic District B-5224), a residential area primarily consisting of two-story brick row houses built between 1890 and 1914. Many of these homes were constructed by Ephraim Macht, the owner of the Welsh Construction Company and Baltimore's first Jewish real estate broker, who built thousands of row houses across the city. The houses in the historic district were known as "porchfront" houses, featuring second-story bay windows, a porchfront in the Philadelphia style, and a porch roof. Some had small front lawns planted with grass, bushes and trees. Queen Anne-style row houses with turrets and decorative masonry were also present on some corner lots.

Most of the historic district was demolished around 2014 to make way for the Coppin State University South Campus expansion. The remaining historic houses are located along North Warwick Avenue (from 1621 to 1825), North Avenue (from 2309 to 2437), and on both sides of Westwood Avenue and Presbury Street, excluding the rowhouses that face Moreland Avenue.

Prior to World War II, the area was a solidly white, middle-class neighborhood. After the war, the population of Coppin Heights/Easterwood and surrounding areas underwent a rapid demographic transition. By the late 1950s, the neighborhood had shifted from being almost exclusively white to predominantly African American. This change provided many Black households in Baltimore with their first opportunity for homeownership. Today, Coppin Heights and its neighboring communities face challenges such as vacant and unmaintained properties, low-income households, unemployment, and crime. As of 2000, it had a population of about 3,000 people, 98% African American, 17% vacant housing, 37% of working-age people were disabled, 15% unemployment, 45% owned a car, 19% of families were in poverty. To address some of these issues, the Coppin Heights Community Development Corporation (CHCDC), a non-profit organization, was created for the area.

In 2008, Coppin State University acquired 210 properties in the Coppin Heights Historic District to build its South Campus expansion. The new campus, located south of Route 40 and constructed around 2014, features buildings for healthcare and technology instruction. A covered over-road walkway connects the South Campus with the university's main campus, which is located across North Avenue in the Mondawmin neighborhood.
