= Carver Vocational-Technical High School =

Public school in Baltimore, Maryland, US

Coordinates: 39°18′15″N 76°39′05″W

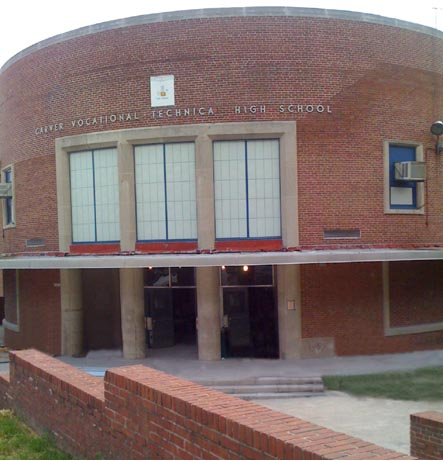

Location
- 2201 Presstman Street; Baltimore, Maryland 21216; United States

Information
- School type: Public, Vocational-Technical, Magnet
- Motto: "A Cut Above the Rest!"
- Founded: 1925; 101 years ago
- School district: Baltimore City Public Schools
- School number: 454
- Principal: Shionta Somerville
- Grades: 9–12
- Enrollment: 876 (2018)
- Student to teacher ratio: 16:1
- Area: Urban
- Colors: Royal Blue and White
- Mascot: Bear
- Team name: Bears
- Website: www.baltimorecityschools.org/schools/454

Carver Vocational-Technical High School – fully George Washington Carver Vocational-Technical High School – also known as Carver Vo-Tech, is a public vocational-technical high school located in the western part of Baltimore, Maryland, United States and part of the Baltimore City Public Schools system.

Founded in 1925, it was the first African-American (then labeled the "Colored" or "Negro") vocational-technical public high school) then established in the State of Maryland. Carver Vo-Tech serves grades 9-12. It was named for the famous African-American scientist / botanist and inventor George Washington Carver (1860s-1943).

== History ==
The establishment of a "Colored Vocational High School" in 1925, then joined the recently renamed Frederick Douglass High School which had been previously founded in 1865 as the private Douglass Institute, located on East Lexington Street (between North Calvert and North Streets (now Guilford Avenue) across from the Battle Monument Square, then moved two blocks northwest to East Saratoga Street by St. Paul Street/Place at Preston Gardens", where it was finally absorbed into the newly established "Colored High School and Grammar School" by the then 54 year old city public schools system in 1883. After several other name changes, building locations and curriculum variations, the emergent alumni, faculty and concerned citizens, with the help of the local "Baltimore Afro-American" newspaper campaigned for the "Negro High School" to have its own new building which was constructed in 1924–1925, on a city block at Carey and Baker Streets, in West Baltimore's Sandtown-Winchester neighborhood. The new school was built of red brick with stone trim in the English Tudor/Gothic architectural style with all the features of a modern high school. Newly named for the famous abolitionist/writer/ editor/statesman/political activist Frederick Douglass (1818-1895), the school moved from its older structure which although of beautiful heavy Romanesque/Renaissance Revival style brickwork which had originally been built a half-century earlier for the city's elite female Western High School, now it was to revert to the lower level of the newly established "junior high schools" system, which would be renamed for "Booker T. Washington" (1856-1915), for continued black students in the still segregated city schools system and would last another century almost with numerous renovations but noting its landmark architecture in the Druid Hill/Upton neighborhoods in old inner West Baltimore. new Dunbar High on the other east side of town also received an art deco style building by the early 1930s.

At the conclusion of the Great Depression of the '30s and World War II, a new building and name was also planned for the vocational school as the city's several other Vo-Tech high schools were reorganized, merged and realigned. The result was the establishment of two Vocational-Technical High Schools, with Carver Vo-Tech at Prestman Street on the west side and the newly merged old Boys and Samuel Gompers into a new Mergenthaler Vocational-Technical High School, being built two years later in 1955 on Hillen Road.

Beginning in the Fall of 1954, following that May's Supreme Court decision of "Brown vs. Board of Education of Topeka, Kansas", Baltimore's "colored schools" system was dismantled gradually but increasingly year by year during the rest of the decade of the 1950s with small numbers of black students entering all the city's neighborhood/regional public high schools. However, "de facto" segregation replaced the "de jure" official policies and some schools still maintained their prior racial make-up. At Carver and Mergenthaler Vo-Techs, despite their advanced programs, opportunities and curriculums, Carver remained almost exclusively all-black, while "Mervo" gradually increased its integration all through the next few decades and remains racially split / somewhat integrated today.

The student body is approximately 1000 students, and the student to teacher ratio is about 14:1.

In 2010, Carver Voc-Tech made AYP (Adequate Yearly Progress), which is accomplished when the school has met minimum improvements in student progress and other accountability measures set by Maryland State under the No Child Left Behind Act.
