= Bridgeview/Greenlawn, Baltimore =

Neighborhood in Baltimore

Bridgeview-Greenlawn
- Neighborhood of Baltimore
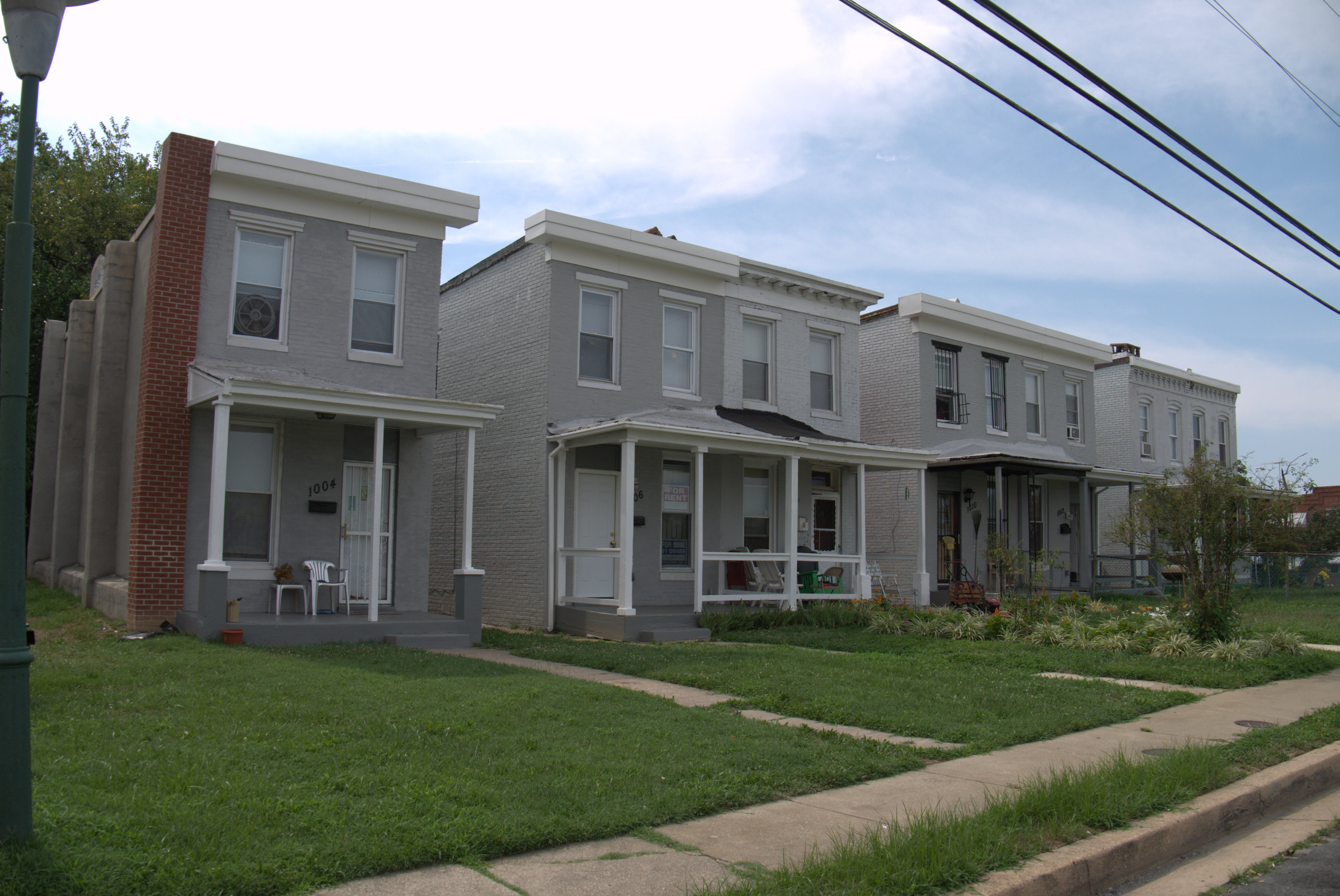
- Houses on the 1000 block of Warwick Avenue in the Bridgeview-Greenlawn, Baltimore

- Location within Baltimore Location within Maryland Location within the United States
- Coordinates: 39°18′5.3″N 76°39′15″W
- Country: United States
- State: Maryland
- City: Baltimore
- Time zone: UTC−5 (Eastern)
  - Summer (DST): UTC−4 (EDT)
- Area Codes: 410, 443, 667

Bridgeview/Greenlawn is a historic, culturally diverse neighborhood in West Baltimore, Maryland. Originally a thriving center for Baltimore's middle class, it is noted for its multicultural American neighborhood, Jewish, Islamic, Catholic and Greek Orthodox traditions. In recent years, it has been included in Amtrak's Frederick Douglass Tunnel Program, which includes a modern ADA-accessible MARC station and a $50 million Community Investment Program.

Bridgeview/Greenlawn is home to Eddie Murray Field at BGE Park, a modern community baseball facility opened in 2017. The field was developed through a partnership between the Cal Ripken Sr. Foundation, BGE, and Baltimore City Public Schools, and is named in honor of Baltimore native and Baseball Hall of Famer Eddie Murray."Eddie Murray Field at BGE Park unveiled". Cal Ripken Sr. Foundation. November 15, 2017.

Located at 1100 Wheeler Avenue, the field has a synthetic turf diamond, dugouts, bleachers, a backstop, and a digital scoreboard. It is the home field for the James Mosher Baseball League, one of the city's oldest African-American youth baseball leagues."Eddie Murray Field at BGE Park - James Mosher Baseball League". Timmons Group. Since its opening, the field has hosted after-school leagues, mentorship programs, and community events, including the Ripken Foundation's Badges for Baseball program, which combines sports with character education and mentoring."Ripken Foundation: 2020 Annual Report". Cal Ripken Sr. Foundation.

== Architecture and parks ==
Bridgeview/Greenlawn is part of the Edmondson Avenue Historic District, which includes **daylight rowhouses**, Gothic-style churches, and early-to-mid 20th century civic buildings. While it lacks large parks within its boundaries, the neighborhood benefits from proximity to Edmondson Village green space and is a short drive from **Druid Hill Park**, one of the oldest large landscaped urban parks in the U.S., notable for its Victorian-era design and historic architecture. |

== History and culture ==
Bridgeview/Greenlawn was established as a streetcar suburb in the early to mid‑20th century and became a hub of Baltimore's middle class following rapid demographic shifts in the 1950s.

== Demographics ==
As of 2020, the neighborhood had an estimated population of about 1,400–2,000 residents.

== Infrastructure and revitalization ==
Bridgeview/Greenlawn is located along the alignment of Amtrak's $6 billion Frederick Douglass Tunnel Program (formerly the B&P Tunnel replacement), scheduled for completion by 2035. The project includes:

- Two new electrified tunnel tubes and upgraded NEC rail infrastructure,
- A modern, ADA-accessible West Baltimore MARC Station,
- A $50 million Community Investment Program supporting local schools, businesses, parks, transportation, workforce training, and historic preservation,
- A salvage center distributing reclaimed building materials from demolished homes to residents and local groups.

In 2014, the Coppin Heights Community Development Corporation (CHCDC) secured control of the building from Coppin State University and the University of Maryland, with a planned $12.4 million rehabilitation project."Coppin Heights CDC secures control of the Hebrew Orphan Asylum for a planned $12.4 million rehabilitation". Baltimore Heritage. October 21, 2014. The project aimed to transform the building into the Center for Health Care and Healthy Living, offering health services to West Baltimore residents. Extensive restoration took place between 2018 and 2020, earning the project a 2020 Phoenix Award from Preservation Maryland for excellence in historic preservation."Preservation Maryland Announces Best of Maryland Award Winners". Preservation Maryland. May 18, 2020. The building officially reopened on October 25, 2023, as a community health center housing offices for the Baltimore City Health Department and Behavioral Health System Baltimore."After years of vacancy, Baltimore's historic Hebrew Orphan Asylum building reopens as a health center". National Trust for Historic Preservation. April 2, 2024.

== Education ==
- James Mosher Elementary School (2400 W Mosher St) serves Pre‑K–5 students from Bridgeview/Greenlawn.

== Sports and youth section ==
Added details on Eddie Murray Field at BGE Park, a youth baseball facility opened in 2017, supporting the James Mosher Baseball League and community mentorship programs. Sources include WMAR‑2, The Daily Record, MASN, and the Cal Ripken Sr. Foundation. Bridgeview/Greenlawn is home to Eddie Murray Field at BGE Park, a modern community baseball facility opened in 2017. The field was developed through a partnership between the Cal Ripken Sr. Foundation, BGE, and Baltimore City Public Schools, and is named in honor of Baltimore native and Baseball Hall of Famer Eddie Murray."Eddie Murray Field at BGE Park unveiled". Cal Ripken Sr. Foundation. November 15, 2017.

Located at 1100 Wheeler Avenue, the field features a synthetic turf diamond, dugouts, bleachers, a backstop, and a digital scoreboard. It serves as the home field for the James Mosher Baseball League, one of the city's oldest African-American youth baseball leagues."Eddie Murray Field at BGE Park - James Mosher Baseball League". Timmons Group. Since its opening, the field has hosted after-school leagues, mentorship programs, and community events, including the Ripken Foundation's Badges for Baseball program, which combines sports with character education and mentoring."Ripken Foundation: 2020 Annual Report". Cal Ripken Sr. Foundation.

The park plays an important role in supporting youth recreation and community engagement in Bridgeview/Greenlawn and the surrounding neighborhoods.

== See also ==
- Edmondson Avenue Historic District
