= City Neighbors High School =

Charter high school in Baltimore, Maryland, USA

Location
- 5609 Sefton Avenue; Baltimore, Maryland 21214; United States; 39°21′1.64″N 76°33′17.24″W

Information
- School type: Public charter
- Motto: Known. Loved. Inspired.
- Founded: 2010
- School district: Baltimore City Public Schools
- School number: 376
- NCES School ID: 240009001690
- Principal: Cheyanne Zahrt
- Grades: 9–12
- Enrollment: 417 (2019)
- Campus size: 5.4 acres
- Campus type: Urban
- Mascot: Lions
- Affiliation: City Neighbors Foundation
- Website: Website

City Neighbors High School is a public charter high school located in the Glenham-Belhar neighborhood of Baltimore, Maryland, United States. Opened in 2010, City Neighbors High was the third school launched by the larger City Neighbors Foundation program, a Baltimore-based charter organization. The school operates as a non-profit 501(c)(3) corporation under the name "City Neighbors High School Inc."

Identifying as a progressive model school, City Neighbors High incorporates arts integration, project-based learning and the Reggio Emilia approach in a small school context.

== History ==
The school located at corner of Bayonne and Sefton Avenues was originally Public School No. 41 - Hamilton Junior High School. Built in 1931, Hamilton Junior High opened for students in the spring of 1932. By 2007, plans were proposed to close the aging school building in the face of declining enrollment and the potential to save City Schools $6 million in maintenance and capital expenses. The school was also among five Baltimore schools that were identified as "persistently dangerous" under standards set by the No Child Left Behind Act. The school board approved a plan to close Hamilton Junior High in the summer of 2009 by a phase out plan where it would not admit new 6th graders.

City Neighbors first opened an elementary/middle school in the former Hamilton Junior High building under the name City Neighbors Hamilton in 2009, and plans were made to add a high school in another part of the building the following year. The high school's initial Freshmen class of 90 students entered in 2010. At the same time, City Neighbors Hamilton & High schools undertook a 6-year $8.9 million renovation of the school buildings. The project was financed by a bond issue by the Maryland Health and Higher Educational Facilities Authority, who in turn loaned the funds to the two school corporations. The school's first class of 86 students graduated in 2014 with a 95% graduation rate. In 2018, City Neighbors High received a 3 out of 5 star rating by the Maryland State Department of Education.
