= Jean Coppin =

Jean Coppin (c. 1615 – c. 1690) was a French traveller and professional soldier, who tried to enthuse the French people for a crusade against the Ottoman Empire.

Coppin travelled to Egypt in 1638, where he stayed for eighteen months. He returned to France with a cargo of antiquities for sale but was raided by Mallorcan pirates. A second voyage was undertaken in 1642–1646, where he was in the Levant, visiting Tunis and Syria, and became consul at Damietta in 1644. He returned to Europe, with firm plans for a crusade, but the authorities were not interested at all. Subsequently, he decided to publish his work, hoping to find the public more willing to listen to his plans.

== Works ==
Coppin's work appeared in 1686. Later editions carries a different title, apparently because a crusade was no longer relevant anymore, putting the emphasis on his voyages.

- Le Bouclier de l'Europe ou la guerre sainte, contenant des avis politiques & chrétiens, qui peuvent servir de lumière aux Rois & aux Souverains de la Chrétienté, pour garantir leurs Estats des incursions des Turcs, & reprendre ceux qu'ils ont usurpé, Antoine Briasson, Le Puy, 1686.
- (other title) Relation des voyages faits dans la Turquie, la Thebaïde, et la Barbarie. Contenant des avis politiques qui peuvent servir de lumières aux Rois & aux Souverains de la Chrétienté, pour garentir leurs Etats des incursions des Turcs, & reprendre ceux qu'ils ont usurpé sur eux.

== Bibliography ==
- Les Voyages en Egypte de Jean Coppin (1638-1639; 1643-1646), IFAO, Serge Sauneron (ed.), 1971
