= Baltimore Career Academy =

Public high school in Maryland, USA

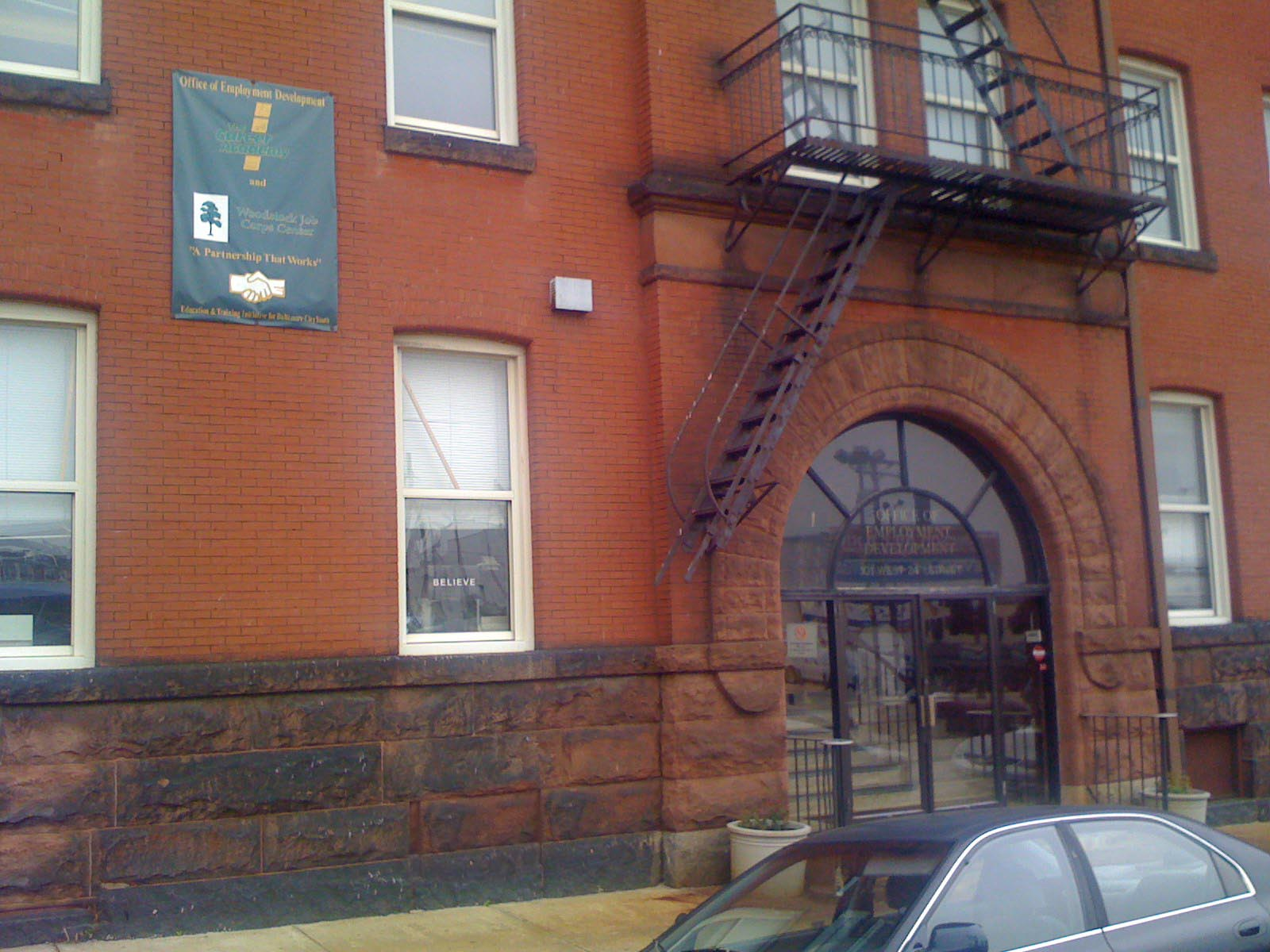

Location
- 101 West 24th Street; Baltimore, Maryland 21218; United States; 39°18′58″N 76°37′6″W

Information
- School type: Public, Alternative, Adult
- School district: Baltimore City Public Schools
- Superintendent: Dr. Sonja Brookins Santelises
- School number: 854
- Principal: Jamel Crandall
- Grades: 11-12
- Area: Urban
- Website: www.baltimorecityschools.org/schools/854

Baltimore Career Academy is a public high school located in Baltimore, Maryland, United States that offers both academic and skills training in an alternative learning environment. The program integrates academic classes with occupational specific training for youth, ages 16–21. The school also offers credit recovery and GED courses for those students who have completed high school credits in other schools.
