= ConneXions: A Community Based Arts School =

Public school in Baltimore, Maryland, United States

Location
- 2801 North Dukeland Street; Baltimore, Maryland 21216; United States; 39°19′5″N 76°39′51.8″W

Information
- School type: Public, Charter
- Founded: 2002
- School district: Baltimore City Public Schools
- Superintendent: Sonja Santelises [CEO]
- School number: 325
- Principal: Sidney Brooks
- Grades: 6-12
- Enrollment: 459 (2016)
- Area: Urban
- Colors: (Official) yellow and red (Alternate) black and white
- Sports: Basketball, American Football Or Gridiron, Baseball, Volleyball
- Mascot: The Cardinal
- Nickname: ConneXion Cardinals
- Website: www.baltimorecityschools.org/schools/325

ConneXions: A Community Based Arts School (formerly known as the ConneXions Community Leadership Academy) is a public secondary school located in Baltimore, Maryland, United States.

ConneXions opened in 2002, and now shares a building with Bard.
