= M. E. Thompson Coppin =

African-American physician

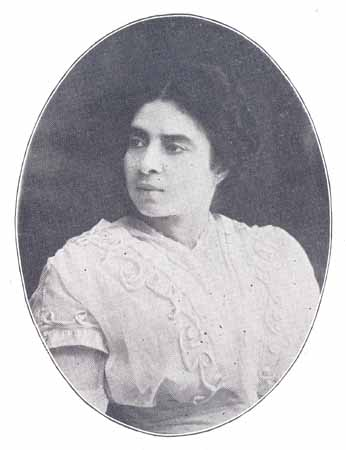
Coppin in 1911

Melissa Evelyn Thompson Coppin (c. 1878 – September 27, 1940) was an American physician. Coppin was the tenth African American woman to earn a medical degree in the United States. She was also known for the creation of the children's welfare group, the Women's Christian Alliance (WCA).

== Biography ==
Melissa Evelyn Thompson was born around 1878. When she graduated from the Woman's Medical College of Pennsylvania (now the Drexel University College of Medicine) in 1900, and she became the tenth African American woman in the United States to earn a medical degree.

In August 1914, Coppin married African Methodist Episcopal Church Bishop Levi J. Coppin. Her husband's wedding present to her was a new car, and which the couple used to drive to their honeymoon at Cape May. Melissa Thompson Coppin was Levi's third wife and together, they had one daughter, Theodosia. Levi died in 1924.

After the end of World War I, Coppin felt there was a need to create a place for young African American women and families who were migrating into the city. Coppin founded the Women's Christian Alliance (WCA) as a child welfare agency, daycare and shelter in Philadelphia in 1919. Coppin's sister, Dr. Syrene Elizabeth Thompson Benjamin, was involved with WCA until 1927, when the sisters disagreed over the "direction of the agency."

Coppin died on September 27, 1940.
