= Youth Opportunity Academy =

Alternative high school in Baltimore, MD, USA

Youth Opportunity School

Location
- 1510 West Lafayette Avenue; Baltimore, Maryland 21217
- Coordinates: 39°17′56.56″N 76°38′33.29″W

Information
- School type: Public, Alternative
- School district: Baltimore City Public Schools
- School number: 858
- Principal: Ayanna McClean
- Grades: 9–12
- Enrollment: 40 (2018)
- Area: Urban
- Website: BCPSS

Youth Opportunity Academy (alternately YO! Academy) is a public, alternative high school located in the Sandtown-Winchester neighborhood of Baltimore, Maryland. The school allows students who have dropped out to obtain either high school diplomas or GEDs. The school is located in the Lafayette Square Community Center, in a building that was originally built in 1972 and originally served as a branch of the Enoch Pratt Free Library.

== YO! Baltimore ==
The academy is run in concert with Baltimore City Public Schools by Youth Opportunity (YO!) Baltimore, a non-profit organization. YO! was founded in 2000 to provide workforce and education support services, mentoring and social services to young people (18-24) in Baltimore. The center also maintains a closet of donated clothes for jobs & interviews. It operates two community resource sites, one in the same center as the academy, the other in East Baltimore, at 1212 North Wolfe Street. Funded from 2000 to 2006 by federal grant, YO! has since operated with funding from the Mayor's Office of Economic Development, and has partnered with Johns Hopkins University. The program has also received volunteers through the AmeriCorps program.
