= Hanlon Longwood, Baltimore =

Hanlon–Longwood
- neighborhood statistical area
- Location within Baltimore
- Coordinates: 39°19′17″N 76°40′31″W
- Country: United States
- State: Maryland
- City: Baltimore

Area
  - Total: 0.537 sq mi (1.39 km^{2})
  - Land: 0.537 sq mi (1.39 km^{2})

Population (2009)
  - Total: 2,608
  - Density: 4,860/sq mi (1,880/km^{2})
- Time zone: UTC-5 (Eastern)
  - Summer (DST): UTC-4 (EDT)
- ZIP code: 21216
- Area code: 410, 443, and 667

Hanlon Longwood is a neighborhood in the Northwest District of Baltimore, located between the neighborhoods of Garwyn Oaks (west) and Burleigh–Leighton (east). It is bounded by North Dukeland Street (east), Garrison Boulevard (west) and the Gwynns Falls Parkway (south). The neighborhood's north boundary is marked by North Longwood Street, North Hilton Street and Liberty Heights Avenue.

== Demographics ==
Hanlon Park–Longwood is a predominantly black neighborhood, with a population estimated at 2,608 in 2009. At $43,466 in 2009, the neighborhood's median household income was higher than the city median of $38,772. However, the average price of a single family home was $234,837, compared with the citywide average of $274,562. Families living below the poverty line in 2009 comprised 22.3 percent of the population in Hanlon Park–Longwood, compared with the citywide average of 22.9 percent.

== Public transportation ==
LocalLink 80 (BaltimoreLink) provides local bus service along Garrison Boulevard, traveling between [[Rogers Avenue (Baltimore Metro Subway Station)|Rogers Avenue Metro Station]] and Downtown Baltimore.

LocalLink 82 (BaltimoreLink) provides local bus service along Hilton Street and Gwynns Falls Parkway, traveling between the Reisterstown Plaza Metro station and the Park Circle area.

== Significant landmarks ==
Hanlon Park dominates the eastern side of the neighborhood. It includes the neighborhood and the similarly named city park. It is named for the son of famous Baltimore Orioles baseball player, manager and owner Ned Hanlon, who led the team in the National League to three championships in 1894, 1895, 1896 for the "Temple Cup" in the pre-World Series era and before the 1901 formation of the American League. He later became a civic and political leader in the Baltimore City government, serving as president of the Board of Commissioners of Parks in the 1920s.

Originally named Ashburton Park, in 1920, the park was renamed “Hanlon Park” as a memorial to Lieutenant Joseph T. Hanlon and one of the first Marylanders to die in World War I. He was the son of park commissioner Edward Hanlon, who was instrumental in the development of the park’s athletic fields. Barely 25 years old, the Baltimore native was regarded as a brilliant officer. He died on July 18, 1918, trying to tend to a fallen troop during heavy shelling in France. He was awarded a Croix de Guerre by the French Army. He was the first officer in the U.S.’s Chemical Warfare Service to die in battle, and a large chemical warfare experimental field was named for him in France. Hanlon Park had also originally been intended as the site of Baltimore City’s first World War I memorial, which was fitting. The memorial was to commemorate 188 service members, with Robert L. Harris as the architect and Hans Schuler as the sculptor.

Lake Ashburton, a 25-acre reservoir inside Hanlon Park, was created in 1910 with the construction of Lake Ashburton Dam along the Gwynns Run stream. The lake is part of an elaborate, expensive and then "state-of-the-art" system of reservoirs built during the 1910s under the direction of famed city engineer Abel Wolman, which included larger substantial reservoirs with surrounding forested watershed areas north of the city in the surrounding suburban Baltimore County: Loch Raven, Prettyboy, and Liberty serving the water filtration system of the Baltimore metropolitan area (including Baltimore City, Baltimore County, and northern portions of Anne Arundel County at the Ashburton Filtration Plant (for the westside) and Montebello Filtration Plant (for the eastside) and were constructed by the Baltimore City Department of Public Works. The frequently tested qua lity of the Baltimore metropolitan water system is unparalleled in the nation and often wins annual "taste test" competitions by water quality associations and is comparable to expensive bottled mineral water.

== See also ==
List of Baltimore neighborhoods
