= Belair-Edison, Baltimore =

Belair-Edison
- Neighborhood
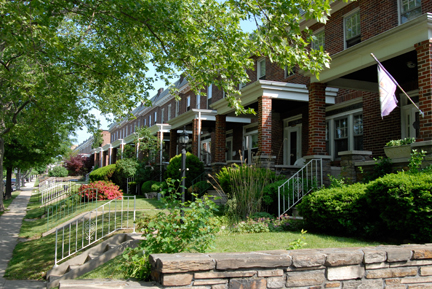
- Rowhouses on Parkside Drive
- Interactive map of Belair-Edison
- Coordinates: 39.3215607°N 76.5678685°W
- Country: United States
- State: Maryland
- City: Baltimore
- Time zone: UTC-5 (Eastern)
  - Summer (DST): EDT
- ZIP code: 21213
- Area code: 410, 443, and 667

Belair-Edison is a neighborhood in the Northeastern part of Baltimore, Maryland, United States. It is located along Harford and Bel Air Roads, above Sinclair Lane, bounded on its eastern and northern side by Herring Run Park. It is a predominantly residential neighborhood with houses that range from middle class to lower income.

== History ==
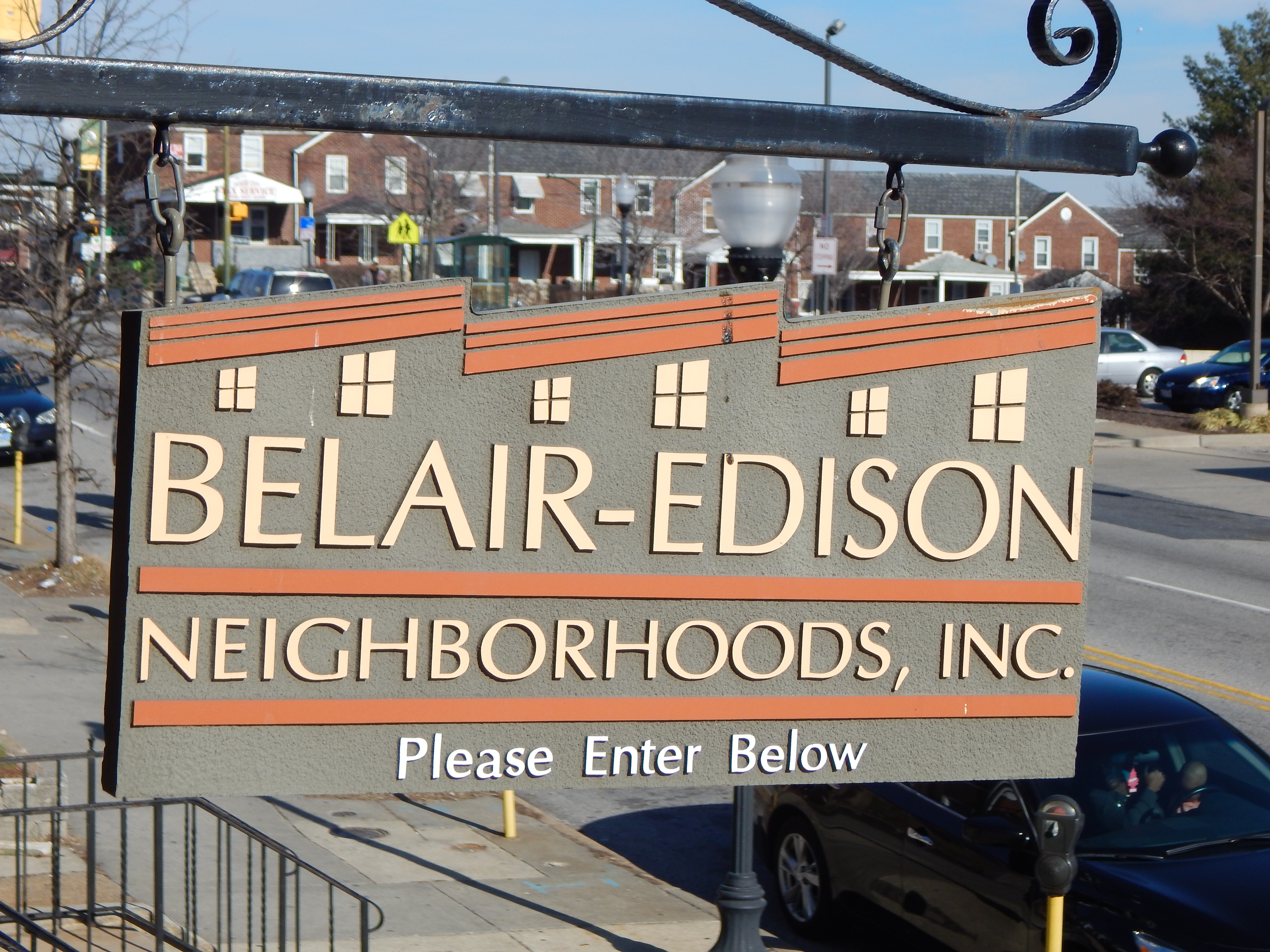
Belair-Edison Neighborhood, Inc.

Once a predominantly white, middle-class and working-class neighborhood, many white residents left the neighborhood due to the loss of jobs at General Motors and Bethlehem Steel, following by white flight that was exacerbated by blockbusting. By the 1990s, the neighborhood had transitioned from having a white majority to having an African-American majority.
