= Coppin Academy High School =

Location
- 2500 West North Avenue; Baltimore, Maryland 21217; United States; 39°18′47.1″N 76°39′27.1″W

Information
- School type: Public, Charter
- Motto: Nurturing Potential...Transforming Lives
- Founded: 2005
- School district: Baltimore City Public Schools
- Superintendent: Dr. Gregory Thornton [CEO]
- School number: 432
- NCES School ID: 240009001530
- Director: Frank Whorley
- Principal: Aisha Almond
- Grades: 9–12
- Enrollment: 352 (2018–19)
- Area: Urban
- Colors: Yellow and Blue
- Mascot: Eagle
- Team name: Coppin State Eagles
- Affiliation: Coppin State University
- Website: www.coppinacademy.org

Coppin Academy High School is a public charter high school located in Baltimore, Maryland, United States. Opened in July 2005, it is located directly on the campus of Coppin State University and is operated by Coppin State.

The student body is composed of approximately 350 students, all chosen by lottery. Once there, the students are afforded the opportunity to interact with and learn from college students and professors from Coppin State.

== See also ==
- Coppin State University
