= Levi Coppin =

American clergyman and missionary

Levi Jenkins Coppin
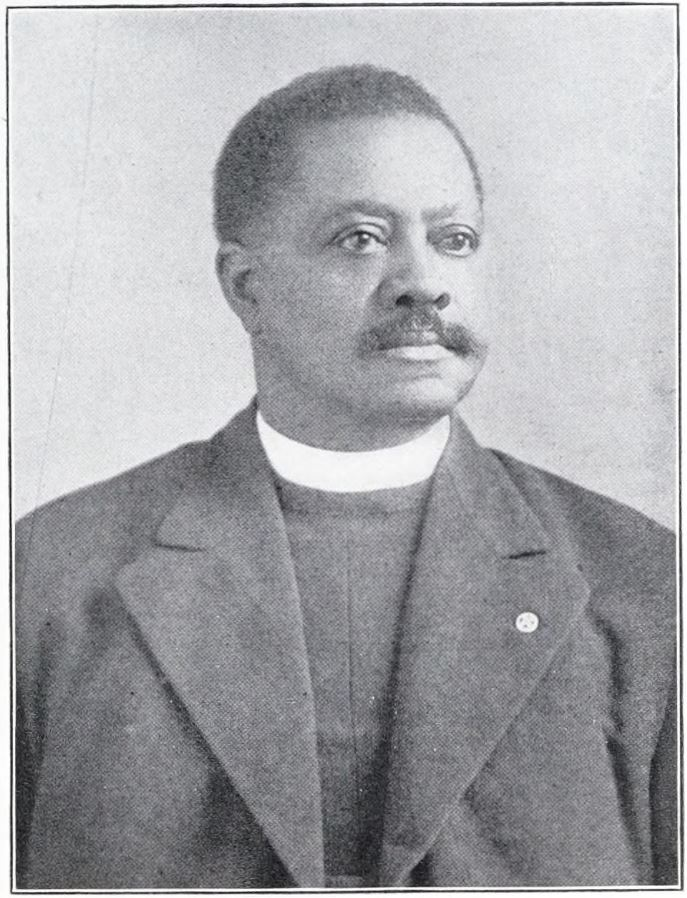
- Coppin in 1910
- Born: December 24, 1848; Fredericktown, Maryland
- Died: June 25, 1924 (aged 75); Philadelphia, Pennsylvania
- Other names: L. J. Coppin
- Occupations: writer, minister

Bishop Levi Jenkins Coppin (December 24, 1848-June 25, 1924) was a minister of the African Methodist Episcopal Church, the editor of the AME Church Review, and one of the founders of the American Negro Academy.

Coppin was born in Fredericktown, Maryland to John Coppin and Jane (Lilly) Coppin. He was taught to read by his mother which was illegal behavior at the time. He joined the AME Church in 1865, and in 1866 was licensed to preach. In 1867, he was admitted to the annual conference from the Bethel Church in Wilmington, Delaware. His first work as a pastor was in Philadelphia and he worked as a pastor at Bethel AME Church in Baltimore, Maryland from 1881 to 1883. He attended the Philadelphia Episcopal Divinity School and graduated in 1887. He was elected editor of the African Methodist Episcopal Church Review in 1888, a position he held until 1896. In 1900 Coppin was elected AME bishop for South Africa and he worked there and in Ethiopia as a missionary. Coppin was a 33° Mason and was responsible for establishing the Masonic Lodge of Capetown.

Pdf of the 1892 book The Afro American Press and its Editors by Irvine Garland Penn

Coppin married three times. In 1875 he married schoolteacher Martha Grinnage and they had a son, Octavius. She died in 1877. In 1881 he married Fanny Jackson Coppin and they were together until her death in 1913. The couple traveled as missionaries to South Africa where they founded the Bethel Institute, a school which promoted self-help programs. In August of 1914 he married M. E. Thompson Coppin and the couple had one daughter, Theodosia.

== Bibliography ==
- In memoriam: Catherine S. Campbell Beckett (1888) - from the Internet Archive
- The relation of baptized children to the church (1890) - from the Internet Archive
- The key to scriptural interpretation, or, Expository notes on obscure passages (1895) - from the Internet Archive
- Observations of persons and things in South Africa, 1900-1904 (1905) - from NYPL Digital Collections
- Unwritten History (1919) - ebook from Documenting the American South
