= Sandtown-Winchester, Baltimore =

Coordinates: 39°18′14″N 76°38′34″W

Sandtown-Winchester
- Neighborhood statistical area
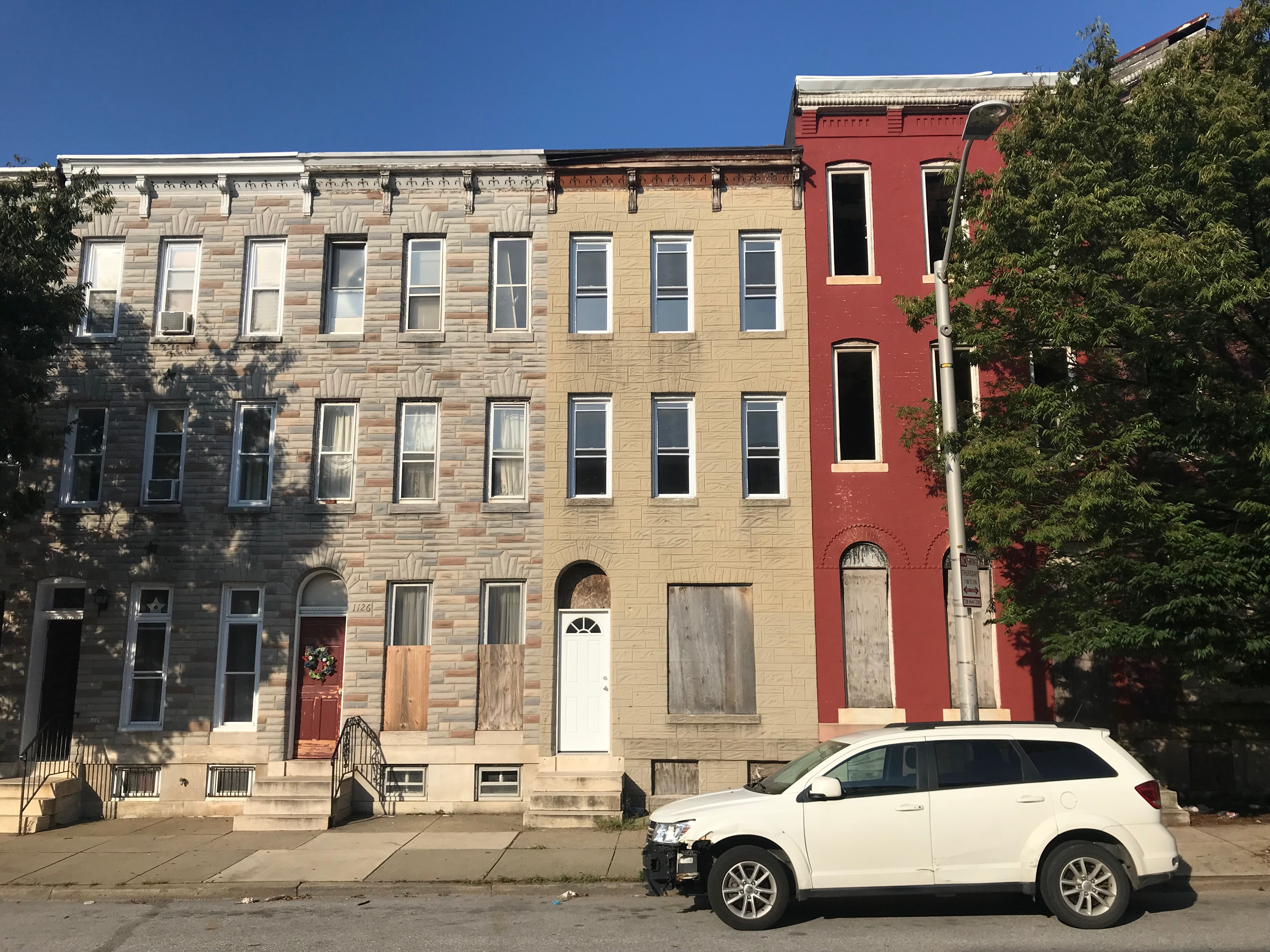
- Rowhouses on the 1100 block of N. Fulton Avenue in Sandtown-Winchester, Baltimore

- Location within Baltimore
- Country: United States
- State: Maryland
- City: Baltimore

Area
  - Total: 0.522 sq mi (1.35 km^{2})
  - Land: 0.522 sq mi (1.35 km^{2})
- Elevation: 190 ft (58 m)

Population (2009)
  - Total: 9,174
  - Density: 17,600/sq mi (6,790/km^{2})
- Time zone: UTC-5 (Eastern)
  - Summer (DST): UTC-4 (EDT)
- ZIP code: 21217
- Area code: 410, 443, and 667

Sandtown-Winchester is a neighborhood in West Baltimore, Maryland. Known locally as Sandtown, the community's name was derived from the trails of sand that dropped from wagons leaving town after filling up at the local sand and gravel quarry back in the days of horse-drawn wagons. It is located north of Lafayette Street, west of Fremont Avenue, south of North Avenue, and east of Monroe Street, covering an area of 72 square blocks, patrolled by the Baltimore Police Department's Western District. The community is 98.5% black.

== History ==
Sandtown is located in a historically black area of West Baltimore neighboring the once affluent Upton. In the second half of the 20th century, Sandtown experienced economic depression, housing abandonment, crime, and the effects of the Baltimore riot of 1968. Whereas in the 1950s and 1960s famous African American performers such as Billie Holiday and Diana Ross performed there and it was sometimes referred to as Baltimore's Harlem, by the time of the 2015 protests and rioting over the death of Freddie Gray, 3% of its population was incarcerated, a third of its housing abandoned, 20% of working age people were unemployed, and a third of residents were living in poverty.

In 2015 Wall Street Journal op-ed columnist William Galston drew lessons from the history of Port Clinton, Ohio, to Baltimore and reported 52% unemployment among 16 to 64 year-olds in the Sandtown-Winchester neighborhood, twice the unemployment rate of Baltimore as a whole.

== Schools ==
- Gilmor Elementary School, grades Pre-k to 5
- New Song Academy, grades Pre-k to 8
- William Pinderhughes Elementary/Middle School, grades Pre-k to 8
- Youth Opportunity Academy, grades 9 to 12

== Notable people ==
- Cab Calloway, late jazz great
- Gervonta Davis, world champion boxer
- Ethel Ennis, jazz singer
- Billie Holiday, jazz singer
- Thurgood Marshall, first African-American justice on the Supreme Court of the United States
- Richard Antoine White, First African-American Ph.D. in Tuba; Principal Tubist for New Mexico Philharmonic and Santa Fe Symphony
- Melvin Williams aka "Little Melvin", former drug lord of Baltimore

== See also ==
- List of Baltimore neighborhoods
