= History of Maryland Transit Administration =

The Maryland Transit Administration was originally known as the Baltimore Metropolitan Transit Authority, then the Maryland Mass Transit Administration before it changed to its current name in October 2001. The MTA took over the operations of the old Baltimore Transit Company on April 30, 1970.

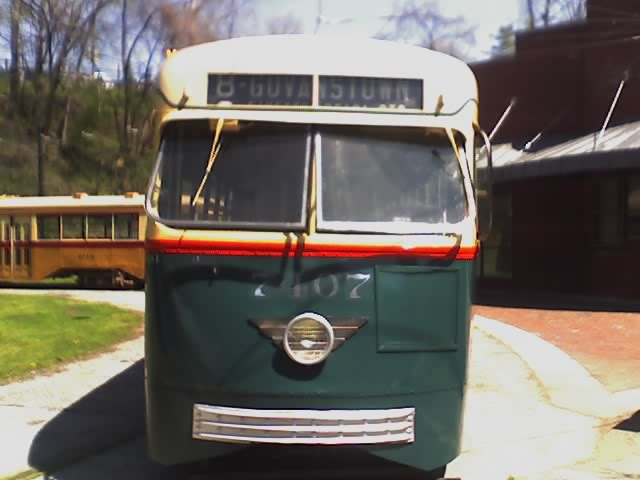
A former no. 8 streetcar, the predecessor to bus Route 8, at the Baltimore Streetcar Museum. This vehicle is now used to give rides to visitors.

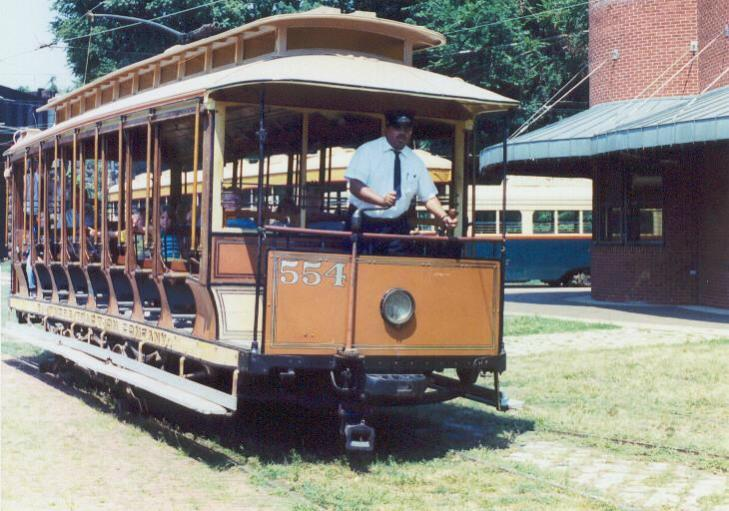
An 1896 open car in operation at the Baltimore Streetcar Museum

Many routes of the agency's current bus lines are based on the original streetcars operated by the Baltimore Transit Company and its parent companies between the 1890s and 1960s. All of these routes were ultimately converted to rubber tire bus operations, and many were consolidated, extended into newly developed areas, or otherwise reconfigured to keep up with the ridership demands of the times. Additional routes and extensions were added in later years to serve newly developed communities and to feed into Metro and Light Rail stations.

With the growth in popularity of the private automobile during the 20th century, streetcar and bus ridership declined, and the needs for public transportation changed. Mass transit in Baltimore and other cities shifted from a corporate operation to a service funded and run by the government. The amount of service provided was greatly reduced. Some areas once served by streetcars are now served minimally by buses or not at all.

The demise of the Baltimore streetcar took place between the years of 1947 and 1963, hastened by National City Lines' acquisition, which said that buses offered lower maintenance and had greater flexibility in traffic. With its rails demolished, Baltimore was no longer a streetcar city. As transit needs and trends changed, rail transit did return to the city, with the Metro Subway opening in 1983 and the Light Rail in 1992.

The track gauge was 5 ft 4 1/2 in (1,638 mm). This track gauge is now confined to the Baltimore Streetcar Museum.

== Parent companies ==
The following bus companies operated many of the services later provided by the Maryland Transit Administration:

=== Baltimore Transit Company ===
The Baltimore Transit Company (BTCO) was a privately owned public transit operator that provided streetcar and bus service in Baltimore from 1935. It was the successor to the old United Railways and Electric Company, formed in 1899 to consolidate and operate Baltimore's streetcar lines. The company was purchased in 1948 by National City Lines and the streetcar system was then run down in favor of buses, a process repeated in many places, which became known as the Great American Streetcar Scandal. The last streetcar ran in 1963. Between 1940–1959, Baltimore Transit also operated trolley buses (or "trackless trolleys") on six lines, including Howard Street and Federal Street.

BTCO was absorbed by what is now the Maryland Transit Administration in 1970. The BTC oversaw the elimination of streetcar service in favor of bus service in 1963 when the last streetcar routes, the number 8 providing service from Catonsville to Towson and the number 15 (Overlea to Walbrook Junction) were eliminated on November 3, 1963.

In the midst of the Civil Rights Movement, the BTCO fired a white bus driver who claimed to be the Grand Wizard of the Baltimore Ku Klux Klan. A labor arbitrator ruled in favor of BTCO in this firing, which was in part spurred by other white drivers threatening to strike if the man was not dismissed.

=== Old Court Bus Lines ===
Old Court Bus Lines was a service that provided van transport in northwest Baltimore County. Its lines served places including Stevenson and Villa Julie College. These services have been provided by MTA since 1973, though much of them have been cut back or modified. Bus Route 60 serves Stevenson University, which used to be known as Villa Julie.

=== Rosedale Passenger Lines ===
Operated service in eastern Baltimore County. Most of its services later became a part of Bus Route 23. The only one still provided by MTA is service to Victory Villa, on Route 4.

=== Dundalk Bus Lines ===
Dundalk Bus Lines provided service in various parts of southeast Baltimore County between 1940 and 1972. MTA serves some of these areas with Bus Route 4.

=== McMahon Services ===
Operated in northeast Baltimore County to locales such as Lutherville and Jacksonville. The only route incorporated by MTA was Route 19A, which later became known as Route 105. Discontinued in 2005.

=== Job Express Transit ===
Operated several routes during the 1960s. Most notably, Route H became known as the #7 Rosewood Express serving Rosewood Center for more than 30 years. The #7 Rosewood Express service ultimately became Route 102 in 2000, and was absorbed by Route M-17 in 2005. Route M-17, along with this service, was eliminated in 2009.

=== Auxiliary Bus Lines ===
Operated some of the routes around the city, such as what is now Route 51.

=== Baltimore Streetcar Museum ===
A track providing service at the Baltimore Streetcar Museum was designated in 1970 as Route 25, and was renamed LocalLink 25 in June 2017.

=== June 2017 Bus Redesign ===
There was a bus redesign in June 2017 called BaltimoreLink.

== Local routes prior to June 2017 ==
| Route | Terminus | Division Operation | Major Streets | Places Served | Corridor Line | Replaced by |
|---|---|---|---|---|---|---|
| Route 1 | Sinai Hospital (NB); Mondawmin station (NB); Fort McHenry (SB) | Bush Street (1) | Greenspring Ave; Fulton Ave; Fort Ave | Coldspring-Newtown; Druid Hill Park; Mondawmin; Sandtown-Winchester; Baltimore Arena; Inner Harbor; Federal Hill | Greenspring Ave/Fulton Ave-Fort McHenry Line | LocalLink 91, 94; CityLink Navy |
| Route 3 | Cromwell Bridge Rd Park & Ride (NB); Sheppard Pratt (NB); Taylor Avenue (NB); Inner Harbor (SB) | Bush Street (1); Kirk Avenue (3) | Loch Raven Blvd; 33rd St; Charles St; St. Paul St | Loch Raven; Eudowood; Ramblewood; Good Samaritan Hospital; Union Memorial Hospital; Waverly; Johns Hopkins University; Charles Village; Penn Station; Mt. Vernon; Enoch Pratt Free Library; Baltimore Arena | Charles St-33rd St-Loch Raven Blvd Line | CityLink Silver, Green; LocalLink 53 |
| Route 4 | CCBC Essex (NB); Turner's Station (SB) | Eastern (2) | Rossville Blvd; Eastern Ave; North Point Rd; Wise Av | Franklin Square Hospital Center; Golden Ring Plaza; Middle River; Essex; Eastpoint Mall; CCBC Dundalk; North Point; Dundalk | Dundalk-Eastern Ave-Essex Line | LocalLink 62 |
| Route 5 | Mondawmin station (WB); Federal Street (EB); Cedonia (EB) | Eastern (2); Northwest (4) | Druid Hill Ave/McCulloh St; Eutaw St; Fayette/Baltimore St; Federal St; Sinclair Ln | Reservoir Hill; Madison Park; Lexington Market; Baltimore Arena; Johns Hopkins Hospital; Collington Square; Moravia | Druid Hill-Sinclair Ln Line | CityLink Yellow, Purple, Pink |
| Route 7 | Mondawmin station (WB); Canton (EB) | Eastern (2); Northwest (4) | Pennsylvania Ave; Paca/Greene St; Pratt/Lombard St | Upton; UMB; Oriole Park; Inner Harbor; National Aquarium; Little Italy; Butcher's Hill; Patterson Park | Pennsylvania Ave-Canton Line | LocalLink 65, 73; CityLink Lime |
| Route 8 | Lutherville station (NB); North Ave (NB) (SB) Selected Trips; UMB Transit Center (SB) | Bush Street (1); Kirk Avenue (3) | Greenmount Ave/York Rd; Fayette/Baltimore St | Goucher College; Towson Town Center; Towson; Towson University; Belvedere Square; Senator Theater; Govans; Waverly; First Mariner Arena | Greenmount Ave-York Rd Line | CityLink Red |
| Route 9 | Lutherville station (NB); International Circle (SB) | Kirk Avenue (3) | York Rd; Deereco Rd; Warren Rd; McCormick Rd | Timonium station; Timonium Fairgrounds; Cockeysville; Warren Road station; McCormick Industrial Park; Hunt Valley Town Center | Hunt Valley Line | LocalLink 93 |
| Route 10 | Catonsville (WB); Dundalk & Center Pl (EB); Bullneck (EB) | Bush Street (1); Eastern (2) | Frederick Rd; Pratt/Lombard St; Eastern Ave; Dundalk Ave | Yale Heights; Pigtown; B&O Railroad Museum; Inner Harbor; National Aquarium; Little Italy; Fells Point; Patterson Park; Highlandtown; Turner's Station | Frederick Ave-Eastern Ave Line | CityLink Purple, Navy |
| Route 11 | Towson Town Center (NB); Bedford Square (NB); Inner Harbor Layover (SB) | Kirk Avenue (3) | Charles St; Bellona Ave; Pratt/Lombard St | Towson Courthouse; Towson University; Rodgers Forge; Homeland; Loyola College; NDMU; Johns Hopkins University; Baltimore Museum of Art; Charles Village; Penn Station; Mt. Vernon; Washington Monument; Baltimore Arena; Convention Center; Inner Harbor | Charles St Line | LocalLink 51 |
| Route 12 | Kirk Avenue Division (SB); Stella Maris (NB) | Kirk Avenue (3) | Greenmount Ave/York Rd; Dulaney Valley Rd | Towson; Hampton; Goucher College | Greenmount Ave-York Rd Line | LocalLink 52 |
| Route 13 | Walbrook Junction (WB); North Ave & Patterson Park Ave (EB); Canton (EB) | Eastern (2); Northwest (4) | North Ave; Washington/Wolfe St | Coppin State College; Johns Hopkins Hospital; Penn-North station; North Avenue station; Great Blacks in Wax Museum | (Crosstown); North Ave-Canton Line | CityLink Gold; LocalLink 21 |
| Route 14 | Patapsco station (NB); Jumpers Hole (SB); Annapolis (SB) | Bush Street (1) | Patapsco Ave; Ritchie Hwy; Crain Hwy; Baltimore-Annapolis Blvd | Brooklyn Park; Glen Burnie; Harundale; Pasadena; Severna Park; MVA Headquarters; Cromwell station (now Glen Burnie); Arundel Medical Center; Marley Station Mall; AACC; U.S. Naval Academy | Ritchie Hwy Line | LocalLink 69, 70 |
| Route 15 | Security Square Mall (WB); Walbrook Junction (WB); Westview Mall (WB); Rutherford Business Park (WB); Gardenville (EB); Overlea (EB); Perry Hall (EB) | Bush Street (1); Kirk Avenue (3) | Security Blvd; Windsor Mill Rd; Forest Park Ave; Poplar Grove St; Edmondson Ave; Saratoga St; Belair Rd | Social Security; Woodlawn; Lorraine; Kernan Hospital; Forest Park; Rosemont; Belair-Edison; Gardenville; Fullerton | Windsor Hills-Saratoga St-Belair Rd Line | CityLink Brown; LocalLink 34, 79, 80 |
| Route 16 | Mondawmin station (NB); Brooklyn (SB) | Bush Street (1); Northwest (4) | Hilton Street; Caton Avenue; Patapsco Avenue | Coppin State College; Rosemont; Violetville; Patapsco station | (Crosstown); Patapsco Ave Line | LocalLink 29 |
| Route 17 | Patapsco station (NB); BWI Airport (SB); Arundel Mills (SB); Parkway Center (SB) | Bush Street (1) | Annapolis Rd; Nursery Rd; Aviation Blvd; Route 100 | Nursery Road station; Linthicum; BWI Airport; BWI Business District; BWI Rail Station; Arundel Mills; Hanover | Nursery Rd-BWI Airport Line | LocalLink 75 |
| Route 19 | Carney (NB); Goucher & Taylor (NB); State Center station (SB) | Bush Street (1); Kirk Avenue (3) | Gay St; Harford Rd; Hillsway/Northern Pkwy; McLean Blvd | Montebello State Hospital; Hamilton; Parkville; Hillendale | Harford Rd Line | LocalLink 54 |
| Route 20 | Security Square Mall (WB); Edmondson Village (WB); City Hall (EB) | Bush Street (1); Eastern (2) | Fayette/Baltimore St; Old Frederick Rd; Crosby Rd; Rolling Rd; Gay St | Woodlawn; Westview Mall; Westview; Edmondson Village; Grace Medical Center; Baltimore Arena; City Hall | Baltimore St/Fayette St Line | CityLink Green; LocalLink 78 |
| Route 21 | Mondawmin station (WB); Fells Point (EB) | Eastern (2) | Gilmor St; Dolphin St; Preston/Biddle St; Caroline St | Sandtown-Winchester; Mt. Royal; State Center station; Meyerhoff Symphony Hall; MICA; University of Baltimore; Sojourner-Douglass College | (Crosstown); Sandtown-Preston/Biddle Streets-Caroline St Line | CityLink Lime, Pink, Navy |
| Route 22 | Mondawmin station (WB); Highlandtown (EB); Bayview Medical Center (EB) | Eastern (2); Northwest (4) | University Pkwy; 33rd St; Erdman Ave; Edison Hwy; Highland Ave; Eastern Ave | BCCC Liberty Campus; Druid Hill Park; Television Hill; Hampden; Johns Hopkins University; Waverly; Highlandtown; Union Memorial Hospital | (Crosstown); 42nd St-Highland Ave Line | LocalLink 22 |
| Route 23 | Catonsville (WB); Wildwood (WB); Fox Ridge (EB) | Bush Street (1); Eastern (2) | Edmondson Avenue; Franklin/Mulberry St; Saratoga St; Fayette/Baltimore St; Eastern Ave | Allendale; Rosemont; West Baltimore station; Baltimore Arena; Shot Tower; Patterson Park; Bayview Medical Center; Eastpoint; Essex Park & Ride lot | Edmondson Ave-Eastern Ave-Fox Ridge Line | LocalLink 77; CityLink Blue, Orange |
| Route 24 | Moravia (WB); Whispering Woods (EB) | Eastern (2) | Eastern Blvd; Sinclair Ln | Martin State Airport; Bowley's Quarters | Eastern Ave-Armistead Gardens Line | LocalLink 59 |
| Route 26 | Downtown Fayette Plaza (WB); Dundalk Marine Terminal (EB) | Eastern (2) | Fayette/Baltimore St; Highland Ave; Eastern Ave; Broening Hwy | Downtown Baltimore; Baltimore Arena; Charles Center; Phoenix Shot Tower; Johns Hopkins Hospital; Highlandtown | Downtown Baltimore-Dundalk Line | LocalLink 65; CityLink Orange |
| Route 27 | Reisterstown Plaza station (NB); Port Covington (SB) | Bush Street (1); Northwest (4) | Belvedere Ave; Falls Rd; Howard St; Russell St; Cherry Hill Rd | Pimlico; Pimlico Race Course; Sinai Hospital; Mt. Washington; Cross Keys; Hampden; Meyerhoff Symphony Hall; Lexington Market; Oriole Park; Greyhound Terminal; Cherry Hill; Harbor Hospital | Falls Rd-Howard St-Cherry Hill Line | LocalLink 26, 31, 71, 73, 82, 94 |
| Route 31 | State Center station (WB); Dundalk & Center Place (EB); CCBC Dundalk (EB) | Bush Street (1); Eastern (2) | Eutaw St; MLK Blvd; Pratt St; Lombard St; Boston St; Dundalk Ave | State Center station; MLK Blvd; Downtown Baltimore; Inner Harbor; Harbor East; Fells Point; Canton; Boston Street; Center Place; CCBC Dundalk | MLK Blvd/Downtown Baltimore-Dundalk Ave Line | CityLink Navy, Gold; LocalLink 65 |
| Route 33 | Rogers Avenue station (WB); Moravia (EB) | Eastern (2); Northwest (4) | | | Coldspring Ln-Moravia Line | LocalLink 28 |
| Route 35 | White Marsh (EB); Blind Industries (WB); UMBC (WB) | Bush Street (1); Eastern (2) | Philadelphia Rd; Pulaski Hwy; Monument/Madison St; Wilkens Ave | Franklin Square Hospital Center; Essex Community College; Golden Ring Plaza; Rosedale; Johns Hopkins Hospital; Inner Harbor; St. Agnes Hospital; Elm Ridge; Arbutus; Lansdowne | Wilkens Ave-Pulaski Hwy/Philadelphia Rd Line | LocalLink 56, 76; CityLink Yellow |
| Route 36 | Northern Pkwy & York Rd (NB); Monroe Street (SB); Kirk Avenue (NB); Riverview (SB) | Bush Street (1); Kirk Avenue (3) | The Alameda; Kirk Ave; Guilford Ave; Washington Blvd; Hollins Ferry Rd | Cedarcroft; Ramblewood; Waverly; Washington Village; Carroll Park; Pigtown; Lansdowne | Washington Blvd-The Alameda Line | LocalLink 53; CityLink Yellow |
| Route 44 | Rosedale Industrial Park (EB); Cedella Loop (EB); Rogers Avenue station (WB); Security Square Mall (WB); Social Security Administration (WB) | Kirk Avenue (3); Northwest (4) | Woodlawn Dr; Gwynn Oak Ave; Rogers Ave; Northern Pkwy; Belvedere Ave; Echodale Ave; Frankford Ave; Moravia Park Dr | Gardenville; Hamilton; Good Samaritan Hospital; Homeland; Roland Park; Sinai Hospital; Pimlico Race Course; Rogers Avenue station; Arlington; Gwynn Oak Park; Woodlawn | (Crosstown); Northern Pkwy-Belvedere Ave Line | LocalLink 30, 31 |
| Route 51 | Rogers Avenue station (NB); Patapsco station (SB) | Bush Street (1); Northwest (4) | Hilton St; Gwynn Falls Pkwy; Pulaski St; Monroe St; Hollins Ferry Rd; Cherry Hill Rd | Arlington; Gwynns Falls; Mondawmin Mall; Rosemont; Cherry Hill; Mt. Winans | (Crosstown); Hilton/Pulaski Streets-South Baltimore Line | LocalLink 26, 73, 82 |
| Route 52 | Mondawmin station (EB); Milford Mill (WB) | Northwest (4) | Liberty Heights Ave/Liberty Rd | Lochearn; Woodmoor; Howard Park; BCCC Liberty Campus | Liberty Line | CityLink Lime |
| Route 53 | Old Court station (NB); Mondawmin station (SB) | Northwest (4) | Reisterstown Rd; Old Court Rd | Pikesville; Reisterstown Road Plaza; Park Heights; Park Circle; Druid Hill Park; Maryland Zoo | Reisterstown Rd-Old Court Line | LocalLink 83 |
| Route 54 | Penn-North station (SB); Milford Mill station (NB); Randallstown (NB) | Northwest (4) | Pennsylvania Ave; Park Heights Ave; Milford Mill Rd; Liberty Rd | Mondawmin; Park Circle; Park Heights; Pimlico; Glen; Fallstaff; Pikesville; Sudbrook Park; Milford Mill | Liberty Rd-Milford Mill-Park Heights Ave Line | LocalLink 81, 85 |
| Route 55 | Towson Town Center (WB); Overlea Loop (EB); Fox Ridge (EB) | Eastern (2); Kirk Avenue (3) | Joppa Rd; Goucher Blvd; Hillsway/McLean Blvd; Northern Pkwy; Kenwood Ave; Rossville Blvd; Back River Neck Rd | Towson Town Center; Towson Marketplace; Parkville; Overlea; Rosedale; Golden Ring Plaza; Franklin Square Hospital Center; Essex Community College; Middle River | (Crosstown); Northern Pkwy-Fox Ridge Line | LocalLink 36 |
| Route 56 | Owings Mills Town Center (SB); Glyndon (NB) | Northwest (4) | Reisterstown Rd | Reisterstown | Reisterstown Rd Line | LocalLink 87 |
| Route 57 | Rogers Avenue station (NB); Gwynn Oak Park (SB); Security Square Mall (SB); Social Security (SB) | Northwest (4) | Gwynn Oak Ave; Woodlawn Dr; Security Blvd | Howard Park; Gwynn Oak Park; Windsor Mill; Woodlawn | Gwynn Oak Ave-Woodlawn Line | LocalLink 31, 34 |
| Route 58 | Reisterstown Plaza station (WB); Mount Washington station (EB); Overlea (EB); White Marsh (EB) | Northwest (4) | Park Heights Ave; Glen Ave; Greenspring Ave | Reisterstown Road Plaza; Cheswolde; Fallstaff | Park Heights-Northern Pkwy Line | LocalLink 33, 34; CityLink Brown |
| Route 59 | Reisterstown Plaza station (SB); Owings Mills Town Center (NB); Red Land Court (NB) | Northwest (4) | Reisterstown Road | Reisterstown Road Plaza; Pikesville; Garrison | Reisterstown Rd Line | LocalLink 89 |
| Route 60 | Reisterstown Plaza station (WB)/(SB); Mount Washington station (EB); Stevenson University (NB) | Northwest (4) | Clarks Ln; Smith Ave | Reisterstown Road Plaza; Mt. Washington; Greenspring Station | Park Heights-Falls Rd Line | LocalLink 34 |
| Route 61 | Bellemore Road (NB); Inner Harbor (SB) | Bush Street (1) | Roland Ave; University Pkwy; St. Paul St | Johns Hopkins University; Union Memorial Hospital; Charles Village; Penn Station | Roland Park Line | LocalLink 95 |
| Route 64 | North Avenue (NB); Curtis Bay (SB); Energy Parkway (SB); Riviera Beach (SB) | Bush Street (1) | St. Paul/Calvert St, Light St; Hanover St; Pennington Ave; Hawkins Point Rd; Fort Smallwood Rd | Penn Station; Mercy Hospital; Inner Harbor; Federal Hill; Port Covington; Brooklyn; Energy Parkway | Light St-Hanover St-Curtis Bay/Fort Smallwood Rd Line | CityLink Silver; LocalLink 67 |
| Route 77 | Old Court station (NB); Patapsco station (SB) | Bush Street (1); Northwest (4) | Old Court Rd; Rolling Rd; Windsor Mill Rd; Security Blvd; Ingleside Ave/Bloomsbury Rd; Washington Blvd; Hammonds Ferry Rd; Hollins Ferry Rd | Randallstown; Windsor Mill; Rutherford Business Park; Woodlawn; Social Security Administration; Security Square Mall; Westview Mall; Catonsville; CCBC Catonsville; UMBC; Arbutus; Halethorpe station; Lansdowne | (Crosstown); Rolling Rd-Lansdowne Line | LocalLink 37; CityLink Yellow |
| Route 91 | Sinai Hospital (NB); Rogers Avenue station (NB)(SB) All Trips VIA; City Hall (SB) | Northwest (4) | Belvedere Ave; Garrison Blvd; North Ave; Eutaw Pl/St | Pimlico; Pimlico Race Course; Rogers Avenue station; Arlington; Walbrook; Coppin State College; Penn-North station; Bolton Hill; State Center station; Maryland General Hospital; Lexington Market; First Mariner Arena | Garrison Blvd-Eutaw Pl Line | LocalLink 31, 80; CityLink Gold, Yellow |

== Neighborhood Shuttle Bug routes prior to June 2017 ==
| Route | Terminus | Division Operation | Major Streets | Places Served | Corridor Line | Replaced by |
|---|---|---|---|---|---|---|
| Route 97 | Mondawmin station | Northwest (4) | Liberty Heights Avenue; Coldspring Lane; Park Heights Avenue; Reisterstown Road; North Avenue; Gwynns Falls Parkway | BCCC Liberty campus; Arlington; Park Heights; Coppin State University; Walbrook | Mondawmin Shuttle Bug | LocalLink 82 |
| Route 98 | Woodberry station | Northwest (4) | Roland Avenue; 41st Street; Keswick Avenue | Hampden; The Rotunda | Hampden Shuttle Bug | LocalLink 21 |

== Shuttle and Circulator routes prior to June 2017 ==
| Route | Terminus | Division Operation | Major Streets | Places Served | Frequency (P/M/E/Sa/Su) | Bus Transfers | Replaced by |
|---|---|---|---|---|---|---|---|
| Route 29 | Cherry Hill (counter-clockwise) | Bush Street (1) | Cherry Hill Road; Waterview Avenue | Cherry Hill Light Rail Stop; Cherry Hill; Cherry Hill Multi-purpose center; Harbor Hospital Center | 20/20/20/20/- | LocalLink 26, LocalLink 71 | Cherry Hill Shuttle |
| Route 50 | Mannasota Avenue & Mayfield Avenue (clockwise) | Kirk Avenue (3) | Mannasota Avenue; Bowleys Lane; Sinclair Lane; Chesterfield Avenue; Clifmont Avenue | Mayfield; Herring Run Park; Parkside Shopping Center; Claremont Senior Homes | 20/40/40/40/40 | Belair-Erdman Shuttle | LocalLink 57 |

== School Supplementary routes prior to June 2017 ==
| Route | Terminus | Division Operation | Major Streets | Places Served | Corridor Line | Replaced by |
|---|---|---|---|---|---|---|
| Route 18 | Glen Avenue & Key Avenue (SB); Velvet Valley (NB); Copper Ridge (EB); Scotts Hill (WB) | Northwest (4) | Park Heights Avenue; Old Court Road; Smith Avenue; Cross Country Boulevard; Glen Avenue | Cheswolde; Bonnie Ridge; Pikesville; Old Court station | Park Heights Schools Line | LocalLink 92 |
| Route 38 | North Bend (WB); Grandview Road & Coldspring Lane (EB) | Bush (1) | Edmondson Avenue; Poplar Grove Street; Liberty Heights Avenue; Greenspring Avenue; Coldspring Lane | Edmondson Village; Rosemont; Walbrook; Windsor Hills; Forest Park; BCCC Liberty Campus; Park Circle; Druid Hill Park; Cold Spring Lane station | (Crosstown); West Baltimore Schools Line | LocalLink 38 |

== Local Express routes prior to June 2017 ==
| Route | Terminus | Division Operation | Major Streets | Places Served | Corridor Line |
|---|---|---|---|---|---|
| Route 103 (Formerly 3X) | Inner Harbor (IB); Cromwell Bridge Park & Ride (OB) | Bush Street (1); Kirk Avenue (3) | Loch Raven Boulevard; Charles Street; St. Paul Street | Loch Raven; Eudowood; Ramblewood; Good Samaritan Hospital; Penn Station; Mt. Vernon | Loch Raven Blvd (Express) Line |
| Route 105 (Formerly 5X) | Downtown (IB); Cedonia (OB) | Eastern (2); Northwest (4) | Eutaw Street; Fayette/Baltimore Streets; Monument/Madison Street; Sinclair Lane | Lexington Market; Baltimore Arena; Johns Hopkins Hospital; Moravia Road | Johns Hopkins Hospital-Sinclair Ln (Express) Line |
| Route 110 (Formerly 10X) | Catonsville (OB); Light Street (IB) | Bush Street (1); Eastern (2) | Frederick Road; Pratt/Lombard Streets | Yale Heights; Pigtown; B&O Railroad Museum; Inner Harbor | Frederick Ave (Express) Line |
| Route 115 (Formerly 15X) | Downtown (IB); Perry Hall (OB) | Bush Street (1); Kirk Avenue (3) | Saratoga Street; Monument/Madison Street; Belair Road | Johns Hopkins Hospital; Belair-Edison; Gardenville; Fullerton | Johns Hopkins Hospital-Belair Rd (Express) Line |
| Route 119 (Formerly 19X) | Carney (OB); Goucher & Taylor (OB); State Center (IB) | Kirk Avenue (3) | Howard Street/Eutaw Street; Gay Street; Harford Road; Hillsway/McLean Boulevard | Montebello State Hospital; Hamilton; Parkville; Hillendale | Harford Rd (Express) Line |
| Route 164 (Formerly 64X) | North Avenue (IB); Riviera Beach (SB) | Bush Street (1) | St. Paul-Light/Calvert Streets; Hanover Street; Pennington Avenue; Hawkins Point/Fort Smallwood Roads | BCPSS Headquarters; Penn Station; Mercy Hospital; Inner Harbor; Brooklyn; Energy Parkway | Hanover St-Fort Smallwood Rd (Express) Line |

Note:

- All AM trips are to Downtown Baltimore
- All PM trips are to outer-points usually the suburbs of Baltimore
- Local express routes are not individual routes

== QuickBus routes prior to June 2017 ==
| Route | Terminus | Division Operation | Major Streets | Places Served | Corridor Line | Replaced by |
|---|---|---|---|---|---|---|
| Route qb40 | CMS Headquarters (WB); Downtown City Hall Selected Trips (EB); Middle River (EB) | Bush Street (1); Eastern (2) | Security Blvd/Cooks Ln; Edmondson Avenue; U.S. Route 40; Fayette/Baltimore Streets; Eastern Avenue | Social Security; Woodlawn; Edmondson Village; West Baltimore station; UMB; Baltimore Arena; Shot Tower; Patterson Park; Johns Hopkins Bayview Medical Center; Eastpoint Mall; Essex Park & Ride | U.S. Route 40-Eastern Ave (Limited-Stop) Line | CityLink Blue, Orange |
| Route qb46 | Paradise Loop (WB); Cedonia (EB) | Bush Street (1); Eastern (2) | Frederick Road; Pratt/Lombard Streets; Baltimore Street; Federal Street; Sinclair Lane | Yale Heights; Pigtown; B&O Railroad Museum; Baltimore Arena; Johns Hopkins Hospital; Collington Square; Moravia | Frederick Ave-Sinclar Ln (Limited-Stop) Line | CityLink Purple, Pink |
| Route qb47 | Walbrook Junction (WB); Overlea (EB) | Bush Street (1); Kirk Avenue (3) | Poplar Grove Street; Saratoga Street; Belair Road | Rosemont; West Baltimore station; Belair-Edison; Gardenville; Fullerton | Rosemont-Belair Rd (Limited-Stop) Line | LocalLink 80; CityLink Brown |
| Route qb48 | Towson Town Center (NB); UMB Transit Center (SB) | Bush Street (1); Kirk Avenue (3) | Greenmount Ave/York Rd; Fayette/Baltimore St | Goucher College; Towson Town Center; Towson; Towson University; Belvedere Square; Senator Theater; Govans; Waverly; Baltimore Arena | Greenmount Ave-York Rd (Limited-Stop) Line | CityLink Red |

== Express routes prior to June 2017 ==
| Route | Terminus | Division Operation | Corridors Served | Places Served | Corridor Line |
|---|---|---|---|---|---|
| Route 102 | Sheppard Pratt/Towson University (WB); White Marsh Park & Ride (EB) | Eastern (2) | Joppa Road; I-695 | Sheppard Pratt Hospital; Towson University; Towson Town Center; North Plaza; Walther Center; White Marsh Mall | White Marsh-Towson Expressbus Link Line |
| Route 104 | Cromwell Bridge Road Park & Ride (NB); Johns Hopkins Hospital (SB) | Kirk Avenue (3) | Loch Raven Blvd; Washington St/Wolfe St | Johns Hopkins Hospital; Loch Raven Boulevard | Loch Raven Blvd-Johns Hopkins Hospital (Express) Line |
| Route 120 | White Marsh Park & Ride (EB); Downtown Baltimore (WB); Johns Hopkins Hospital (WB) | Eastern (2); Kirk Avenue (3) | I-95 | Johns Hopkins Hospital; White Marsh Mall; White Marsh Park-and-Ride | White Marsh (Express) Line |
| Route 150 | Columbia (WB); Downtown Baltimore (EB) | Bush Street (1) | U.S. Route 40; Edmondson Avenue; U.S. Route 29; Little Patuxent Parkway; Twin Rivers Road; Harpers Farm Road | City Hall; West Baltimore MARC station; Catonsville; Edmondson Village; Mall in Columbia; Harper's Choice; Ellicott City; Normandy | Columbia-U.S. Route 40 (Express) Line |
| Route 160 | Whispering Woods (EB); Fox Ridge (EB); Downtown Baltimore (WB); Johns Hopkins Hospital (WB) | Eastern (2) | I-95; Eastern Ave/Eastern Blvd | Middle River; Essex; Eastwood | Eastern Blvd (Express) Line |

== Former bus routes ==
| Route | Major Streets | Places Served | Years of operation | Replaced by | Notes |
|---|---|---|---|---|---|
| 0 Druid Hill Park – Patterson Park | Druid Hill Ave, Paca, Lombard, Exeter, Pratt | | 1893–1920 (streetcar) | Route 5 | |
| 2 Druid Hill Park – Fort McHenry | Pennsylvania Ave, Cumberland St, Carey St, Charles St, Fort Ave | | 1893–1959 (streetcar before 1948) | Route 1 | Merged with Route 1 when both trackless trolley routes were converted to bus |
| 2 Fox Ridge – Overlea | Rossville Blvd, Kenwood Ave | Golden Ring Mall; Franklin Square Hospital; Essex Community College; Rosedale | 1972–1977 | Route 55 | |
| 2 Catonsville – City Hall | Rolling Road; Frederick Road; Pratt Street; Lombard Street | Yale Heights; B&O Railroad Museum | 1982–2005 | Route 10 | Combined with Route 10 as part of GBBI to provide single-seat crosstown service |
| 4 Windsor Hills – Downtown | Windsor Mill Rd, Bloomingdale Rd, Poplar Grove St | | 1894–1954 (was a streetcar) | Route 15 | |
| 5 Clement & Charles – Charles St. & North Avenue | Fremont Avenue | Bolton Hill; Ridgely's Delight | 1894–1910 (was a streetcar) | renumbered Route 30 | |
| 6 Wagner's Point – Roland Park; East Monument | Hanover Street; St. Paul Street; Roland Avenue; Monument Street | Curtis Bay; Federal Hill; Charles Village; Johns Hopkins University; Johns Hopkins Hospital | 1892–1977 (was a streetcar before 1948) | Routes 61, 62, 63 (now Route 64), and 64 | Was split into four routes. Service today is provided in the Roland Park area by Route 61 (peak hours only), in East Baltimore on Route 35, and south of downtown on Route 64. |
| 6 Eastpoint – Ft. Howard | North Point Road | North Point; Edgemere | 1996–1999 | not replaced | Previously, Ft. Howard had been served by other routes including the #26 Streetcar, Bus Route 9, and the current Bus Route 4. Route 4 service was eliminated in 1993 and replaced by a private contractor. Route 6 restored MTA service there in October 1996, but was eliminated in January 1999. |
| 6 Edmondson Village – Cedonia | Baltimore Street; Federal Street; Sinclair Lane; Cedonia Avenue | Downtown Baltimore; Johns Hopkins Hospital | 2008-2010 | Routes 30, 46 | West side service replaced with a new Route 30. Eastside service replaced with Route 46 Quickbus. |
| 9 Catonsville – Ellicott City | Frederick Road | Oella | 1893–1957 (streetcar before 1955) | not replaced at time | Route 150 provides service between Baltimore and Ellicott City during peak hours |
| 9 Sparrows Point – Ft. Howard | North Point Road | Edgemere | 1971–1973 | Routes 4, 10 | |
| 11; Lakeside to Roland & University Parkway | Roland | | 1890s–1924 (was a streetcar) | Renumbered Route 28 | |
| 12; Cloverdale & McCulloch – Westport | McCulloch, North, John Avenue, Lafayette, Park, Camden, Paca, Fremont, Ridgely, Annapolis | | 1893–1938 (was a streetcar) | portions replaced by Route 17 (later merged into route 28; service now provided by Route 27), rest not replaced | |
| 12; Halethorpe – Downtown | Wilkens Avenue, Park Heights Avenue | | 1948–1959 | Routes 3, 5 | |
| 12; Westview/Essex – Downtown | U.S. Route 40; Interstate 95 | Catonsville; Essex | 1972–1991 | Routes 150, 160 | Route 12 was the designation for express routes from both the western and eastern suburbs. The route was redesignated in 1991. |
| 12; North Linthicum station – Parkway Center | Nursery Road; Hammonds Ferry Road; Camp Meade Road; Aviation Boulevard; Dorsey Road | Linthicum; BWI Airport; BWI Amtrak | 1993–1996 | Route 17 | Route 12 was formed in 1993 as a replacement for Route 230, which was eliminated in conjunction with the opening of the south end of the Light Rail. It also served a part of Route 17, which had been rerouted at the time. In 1996, Routes 12 and 17 were combined, with portions of both routes eliminated and not replaced. |
| 14; Ellicott City – Downtown | | | 1898-1954 (streetcar) | Route 23 | |
| 15A; Kingsville/Perry Hall/White Marsh – Downtown Baltimore | Overlea | Belair Road | 1973–1991 | Route 43 (now Route 15) | Was redesignated as Route 43 in 1991. Route 43 Kingsville service was merged into Route 15 in 1992. Route 43 White Marsh service was merged into Route 66 at the same time, but Route 66 was eliminated in 1993, and White Marsh service became a part of Route 15. Service between Overlea and White Marsh Mall/White Marsh Town Center is now provided by Route 58. |
| 16; Madison Avenue & Clover – Broadway & Thames | Madison Avenue, Eutaw Street, Baltimore Street, Broadway | | 1893-1959 (streetcar before 1948) | not replaced | |
| 16; Odenton/Ft. Meade/BWI Airport – Downtown | Aviation Boulevard; Dorsey Road | BWI Airport; BWI Amtrak | 1973-1989 | Route 230 and Route 240 | |
| 16; North Linthicum station – Ft. Meade | Baltimore-Washington Parkway | express service | 1993–1995 | Private carrier (now other agencies) | Connect-a-ride Route K provides service to Ft. Meade from Arundel Mills |
| 17 | | St. Paul Street | 1893–1947 (was a streetcar) | Route 3 and Route 28 (which was discontinued in 2001) | |
| 17 | Butcher's Hill | Fayette Street | 1949–1950 | Route 23 | Route 17 was formerly the St. Paul Street streetcar but was replaced by Route 3 and Route 28 (which was discontinued in 2001) in 1947 |
| 18; Canton – Downtown | Pennsylvania Avenue | | 1894–1959 (streetcar before 1952) | Route 7 | |
| 18; Hereford/Warren Road/ Timonium Park & Ride – Downtown | York Road; Interstate 83 | Cockeysville; Timonium | 1973–1992 | Light Rail | |
| 18; Fairgrounds station – Hunt Valley Mall | York Road | Cockeysville | 1992-1993 | Route 9 | Route nearly duplicated Route 9 |
| 18; Cromwell station – Old Mill | Oakwood Road; Elvaton Road; Old Mill Road | Glen Burnie | 1993–1996 | not replaced | In 1995, service after 7 pm was discontinued. In 1996, line was completely discontinued due to low ridership. |
| 20; Patterson Park – Downtown | Orleans Street | | 1894–1929 (streetcar) | Route 6 (later split; this section served by Route 62, later Route 35) | |
| 20; Gwynn Oak Junction – Pimlico | Gwynn Oak, not a street, Belview, and Belvedere | | 1930 (was a streetcar) | Temporary service when Route 33 was suspended during the Great Depression | |
| 20; Dundalk Short Line | | | 1930-1936 (was a streetcar) | not replaced | |
| 22; Canton | Washington Street | | 1895–1938 (streetcar) | Route 34 (later merged into Route 22) | |
| 23; Middle River – Downtown | Washington Street | | 1895–1942 (streetcar) | Route P (which was changed to Route 23 in 1950) | |
| 24; Sparrows Point – Downtown | Eastern Avenue; Dundalk Avenue | | 1903–1926 (streetcar) | renumbered Route 26 | |
| 24; Lakeside to Roland & University Parkway | Roland | | 1929–1950 (was a streetcar) | replaced by expanded trips on Route 56 (now Route 11) | Only operated from 1:30am to 5:30am. |
| 24; Pimlico Park & Ride | | | 1974–1984 | Metro Subway | |
| 24; Brooklyn – Curtis Bay | | Patapsco Avenue | 1986–1987 | Route 22 | |
| 25; Belvedere – Camden Station | | Falls Road | 1897–1959 (streetcar before 1949) | Route 10 | |
| 26; Sparrows Point – Highlandtown | Eastern Avenue; Dundalk Avenue | | 1926–1959 (streetcar before 1958) | Route 10 (no Sparrows Point service) | This route has recently been resurrected to serve between Downtown Baltimore and Dundalk Marine Terminal, including the new Amazon Distribution Facility on Holabird Avenue. |
| 26; Providence Road Park & Ride – Downtown Baltimore | express service | Towson | 1976–1993 | Shuttle to Light Rail | Was an express service that operated through Towson, then downtown via I-83. In 1992, along with the Light Rail opening, the number of trips were cut in half. In 1993, all express service was discontinued. A shuttle was formed in response to protests to total elimination. |
| 26; Providence Road Park & Ride – Lutherville station | Fairmount Avenue; Seminary Avenue; Ridgely Road | Towson Town Center; Hampton | 1993–1995 | not replaced | |
| 27; Washington Boulevard line | Washington Boulevard | Pigtown | 1905–1959 (streetcar until 1938, trolley until 1957) | Route 11 | Merged into Route 11. Service is provided by Route 36. |
| 28; Gwynn Oak Park | | | 1908–1910 (streetcar) | Route 3 | |
| 28; Guilford | | | 1924–1924 (streetcar) | Renumbered Route 11 | |
| 28; Lakeside – Roland & University Parkway | Roland | | 1924–1929 (streetcar) | Renumbered Route 24 | |
| 28; Randallstown – Cherry Hill/Baltimore Highlands | Liberty Road/Liberty Heights Avenue; Eutaw Street/Place | Mondawmin; Reservoir Hill; Bolton Hill | 1947–2001 | Routes 5, 27, 29, 91, M-1, M-6 | In 1984, service west of Mondawmin was replaced with "M-lines" during Metro's hours. In 1993, service south of the Cherry Hill Light Rail Stop was replaced with Routes 29 and 30 . In 1996, all Monday-Saturday service was discontinued. Route 5 was modified to replace service in Reservoir Hill, Route 27 was extended to Cherry Hill, and service elsewhere on the route was provided already by other existing lines. In 2001, the remaining service on Sunday was discontinued when M-lines started to operate on Sundays. |
| 29; Roland Park to Downtown Baltimore | Roland Avenue; University Parkway; St. Paul Street | Charles Village; Johns Hopkins University | 1908–1959 (streetcar before 1947) | Route 6 (now 61) | |
| 29; Timonium Park-and-Ride – Downtown Baltimore | I-83 | express service | 1983–1988 | Route 18 (now Light Rail) | |
| 30; Clement & Charles – Charles St. & North Avenue | Fremont Avenue | Bolton Hill; Ridgely's Delight | 1910–1993 (was a streetcar before 1950, and a trolley before 1958) | not replaced | In 1992, service on this route was cut in half. When discontinued in 1993, no replacement service on route was provided, but other buses operate near entire route. |
| 30; Cherry Hill station – Patapsco station | Hollins Ferry Road | Mt. Winans; Baltimore Highlands | 1993–2001 | Route 51 | Merged into Route 51 |
| 30; City Hall/Bayview Medical Center – Edmondson Village | Old Frederick Road, Fayette/Baltimore Streets, Pratt/Lombard Streets, Eastern Avenue | Edmondson Village; Bon Secours Hospital; Baltimore Arena; Inner Harbor; National Aquarium; Little Italy; Fells Point; Patterson Park; Highlandtown | 2010–2015 | additional service on Route 20 and rest covered by Route 10 | |
| 31 | | Garrison Boulevard | 1917–1952 (streetcar) | Route 19 | |
| 31; Halethorpe – Penn Station | Wilkens Avenue | UMBC; St. Agnes Hospital | 1987–2005 | Routes 35 and 77 | Service between UMBC and downtown merged into Route 35 in 2005 as part of GBBI. Service between UMBC and Halethorpe replaced by Route 77. |
| 32; Randallstown – Downtown Baltimore | Milford Mill; Howard Park | Liberty Heights Avenue | 1920–1959 (streetcar before 1955) | Route 28 | Routes 52 and 54 provide service on Liberty Road/Heights Avenue |
| 32; Hillen Road Park & Ride – Downtown Baltimore | Waverly; Charles Village | Perring Parkway; Hillen Road; 33rd Street; St. Paul Street; Calvert Street | 1979–1982 | not replaced | |
| 33 | | Hudson Street | 1920–1924 | Route 18 (later Route 7) | |
| 33; Gwynn Oak Junction – Downtown | | Gwynn Oak, not a street, Belview, Belvedere, and Heights Avenue | 1924–1948 | Route 5 (portion converted to buses) and a branch of Route 32 (remaining streetcar portion) | |
| 33 | | Milton Street | 1950–1954 | Route 13 | |
| 34; North & Washington – Canton/Highlandtown | Fells Point | Wolfe Street; Eastern Avenue | 1907–1975 (streetcar before 1950) | 10, 13, and Route 22 | |
| 35; Lorraine – Walbrook Junction | Windsor Hills | Forest Park Avenue | 1904–1966 (streetcar before 1954) | Route 15 | |
| 35; UMBC – Catonsville Community College | | Wilkens Avenue; Rolling Road | 1966 | College operated shuttles | Route 77 provides service between UMBC and CCBC Catonsville |
| 35; Garrison Boulevard – Morgan State University | Arington; Roland Park; Homeland | Coldspring Lane | 1968–1969 | Route 33 | |
| 37; Randallstown – Cherry Hill | Milford Mill; Lochearn; Howard Park; Mondawmin; Reservoir Hill; Bolton Hill; Westport | Liberty Heights Avenue; Eutaw Street; Russell Street | 1947–1974 | Route 28 (now Routes 54, 52, 5, 91, and 27) | No. 37 designation was specifically reserved for trips on the route of bus no. 28 going to Cherry Hill |
| 38; Sparrows Point – Ft. Howard | | | 1951–1952 | Dundalk Bus Lines | (service not provided now) |
| 40; Pikesville – Glyndon | Owings Mills; Reisterstown | Reisterstown Road | 1948–1951 | Route 5/Route 7 (since split) | Routes 56 and 59 operate along this route |
| 43; Kingsville/White Marsh – Downtown Baltimore | Overlea | Belair Road | 1990–1992 | Route 15 | |
| 44X; Springlake Way & Bellona Avenue – Overlea | Hamilton | Northern Parkway | 1970–1990 | Route 66 | Route 58 now serves this area, and Route 55 covers the portion of this line between McLean Blvd and Overlea. |
| 45; Baynesille – Waverly | | Loch Raven Boulevard | 1949–1956 | Route 3 | |
| 46; Clipper Mill – Hampden | | Union Avenue | 1901–1970 (streetcar before 1949, but was not numbered 46 until later) | Route 22 (now Route 98) | |
| 46; Northwest School Trips | Robert Poole, Falstaff, and Pimlico Middle Schools, and Northwestern High School | | 1999–2003 | absorbed by line services | |
| 47; Cheswolde – Downtown | | Cross Country Boulevard | 1950–1989 (streetcar before 1950, but was not numbered 47 until later) | not replaced | Riders directed to take bus to Metro. Route 58 serves area and connects to Metro and Light Rail. |
| 47; Bush School Trippers | Benjamin Franklin and Lombard Middle Schools, and Southern High School | | 1998–2002 | absorbed by line services | |
| 48; Belvedere Loop – Mount Washington | | Belvedere Avenue, Pimlico Road, Ken Oak, Cross Country, and Kelly Avenue | 1949–1951 (streetcar before 1950) | Route 25 (service later obtained on Route 10, and until June 2017 on Route 27) | |
| 48; S.E.E.T. Shuttle | | | 1988–1989 | not replaced | |
| 48; Kirk School Trips | Hamilton Middle School and Northern High School | | 1997–2004 | absorbed by line services | |
| 49; Edmondson Village | | Belvedere Avenue, Pimlico Road, Ken Oak, Cross Country, and Kelly Avenue | 1950–1952 | Route 20 | |
| 49; S.E.E.T. Shuttle | | | 1988–1989 | not replaced | |
| 49; Eastern School Trips | Thurgood Marshall and Southeastern Middle Schools, Schools #170 and #171, and Patterson High School | | 1996–2004 | absorbed by line services | |
| 52; Lansdowne – Morrell Park | | Washington Boulevard; Hammonds Ferry Road | 1948–1957 | Route 27 | Now served by Route 36 |
| 53; Parkville – Carney | | Harford Road | 1948–1956 | Route 19 | |
| 54; Randallstown – Gwynn Oak Junction | Milford Mill; Lochearn; Sudbrook Park | Liberty Road; Milford Mill Road | 1948–1955 | Route 32 | Served by routes 52 and new Route 54 (unrelated) |
| 55 | | North Point Road | 1948–1952 | Dundalk Bus Lines (now Route 4) | |
| 56; Murray Hill – Bedford Square | Homeland; Roland Park | Charles Street | 1948–1953 | Route 11 | |
| 57; Old York Rd & 33rd St – Harford Rd | Waverly | Gorsuch Avenue | 1947–1975 | not replaced | |
| 58; Brighton – Greenspring Manor | Fallstaff | Cross Country Boulevard | 1948–1973 | Route 44 (now new Route 58) | |
| 58; Pimlico – Ranchleigh | | Pimlico Road | 1973–1975 | Route 44 (now new Route 58) | |
| 58; Reisterstown Road Plaza – Mt. Washington | Pikesville | Smith Avenue | 1976–1978 | not immediately replaced (served now by current Route 58 and Route 60) | |
| 58A; Reisterstown Road Plaza – Greenwood | Pikesville; Villa Julie College | Stevenson Road; Greenspring Valley Road | 1973–1975 | Route 5 (later Metro connection routes; service to Stevenson University (formerly Villa Julie) is now provided by Route 60; service on Stevenson Road is not provided.) | |
| 59; Ponca & Holabird – Colgate Warehouses | | | 1948–1953 | not replaced | |
| 61; Pier 6 Parking Lot – Preston Street Parking Lot | Downtown Baltimore | Howard Street; Saratoga Street | 1946–1949 | not replaced | |
| 62; Hollander Ridge – Inner Harbor | Armistead Gardens; Johns Hopkins Hospital | Pulaski Highway; Madison/Monument | 1977–2000 | Route 35 | |
| 63; Curtis Bay – Davison Chemical | | Pennington Avenue | 1948–1951 | Route 6 | |
| 63; Riviera Beach – Downtown (1977–1993)/Patapsco station (1993–1996) | | Ft. Smallwood Road; Pennington Avenue | 1977–1996 | Route 64 | |
| 64; Northwood Shopping Center | | | 1955–1957 | not replaced | |
| 65; A.R.D.C. Shuttle | | | 1956–early 1960s | not replaced | Only personnel from the U.S. Air Force could ride this bus. |
| 65; Patapsco station – Wagner's Point | | Patapsco Avenue; Frankfurst Avenue | 2003–2005 | not replaced | |
| 66; Arundel Crosstown | Hamilton | Northern Parkway | 1974–1982 | not replaced | |
| 66; Bellona and Springlake – Overlea | Hamilton | Northern Parkway | 1991–1993 | Routes 36, 55 and current Route 58 | |
| 67; Howardsville Station – Pleasant Street | Sudbrook Park; Pikesville | Reisterstown Road | 1956–1968 | not replaced (Metro Subway serves route) | |
| 67; Rogers Avenue station – Pimlico Racetrack | Pimlico Shuttle | | ?–? | not replaced | |
| 68; Walbrook Junction – Windsor Hills | Forest Park; Dickeyville Historic District | Forest Park Avenue | 2003–2007 | Route 15 | Provided local service to Windsor Hills while Forest Park Avenue bridge over Gwynns Falls was being replaced |
| 70; Fallsway Park & Ride shuttle | Downtown Baltimore | | 1990–1992 | not replaced | |
| 71; Charles Center station – Johns Hopkins Hospital station | | | 1988–1995 | Metro Subway extended to Hopkins in 1995 | |
| 73; Penn Station – Downtown Baltimore | MARC shuttle | | 1991 | not replaced | |
| 73; Eastern High School – Baltimore Museum of Art | Monet - BMA Shuttle | | 1992–1993 | not replaced | |
| 76; Towson shuttle | | | 1985–1990 | not replaced | |
| 80; Uptown shuttle | | | 1959–1962 | not replaced | |
| 86 various locations – Social Security | various routes | | 1960–2005 | not replaced; riders directed to use other lines | |
| 87; Johns Hopkins Hospital Express | | | 1974–1975 | not replaced | Park & Ride Service to Hopkins Hospital from Westview, Timonium, Pimlico, Memorial Stadium, City Hall, and GEM Lot East |
| 87; North & Milton – Social Security | West Baltimore | North Avenue; Edmondson Avenue | 1985–1990 | not replaced; riders directed to use other lines | |
| 88; White Marsh Mall | | | 1984–1985 | not replaced | |
| 90; Sinai Hospital – Belvedere Loop | Sinai Hospital Shuttle | | 1959–1960 | 19 | |
| 92; Lombard & Pratt Streets | Baseball Service | | 1992 | not replaced | |
| 93; Paca & Eutaw Streets | Baseball Service | | 1992–2003 | not replaced | |
| 96; Metro Clean Up | | | 1987–1988 | discontinued when Subway hours expanded | |
| 96; Zoo Shuttle | | | 1997–2001 | not replaced | |
| 99; Fort Howard Shuttle | | | 1950–1951 | renumbered Route 38 | only shown on a 1950 map |
| 99; Old Court station – BWI Airport | Randallstown, Windsor Mill, Rutherford Business Park, Woodlawn, Social Security Administration, Security Square Mall, Westview Mall, Catonsville, CCBC Catonsville, UMBC, BWI Airport, BWI Business District | Old Court Road, Rolling Road, Windsor Mill Road, Security Boulevard, I-695 (Beltway), Bloomsbury Road, I-195, Elm Road | ?-2016 | | |
| 102; Rosewood Center – Fremont Avenue | Rosewood Lane; Reisterstown Road; Park Heights Avenue; Pennsylvania Avenue; Fremont Avenue | Owings Mills; Pikesville; Park Heights | 2001–2005 | Route M-17 (now completely defunct) | |
| M-1; Mondawmin station – Milford Mill | Baltimore City Community College; Howard Park; Gwynn Oak; Lochearn | Liberty Heights Avenue/Liberty Road | 1984–2009 | Redesignated Route 52 | |
| M-2; Mondawmin station – Old Court station | Park Heights; Reisterstown Road Plaza; Pikesville | Reisterstown Road; Old Court Road | 1984–2009 | Redesignated Route 53 | |
| M-3; Penn-North station – Milford Mill station | Park Heights; Pimlico Race Course; Druid Hill Park; Mondawmin | Park Heights Avenue; Slade Avenue | 1984–2009 | Route 54 | Originally started at Mondawmin station |
| M-5; Rogers Avenue station – Towson | Cheswolde; Mt. Washington; Ruxton | Glen Avenue; Greenspring Avenue; Smith Avenue; Falls Road; Ruxton Road; Bellona Avenue; Joppa Road | 1987–1992 | Route M-10 (now provided by Route 58 between Reisterstown Plaza Station and Mt. Washington) | |
| M-6; Rogers Avenue station – Security Square Mall | Howard Park; Woodlawn; Social Security Administration | Gwynn Oak Avenue; Woodlawn Drive | 1987–2009 | Redesignated Route 57; no routing changes made | |
| M-8; Rogers Avenue station – Randallstown | Milford Mill; Northwest Hospital | Milford Mill Road; Liberty Road | 1987–2009 | Route 54 | |
| M-9; Reisterstown Plaza station – Glyndon | Pikesville; Garrison; Owings Mills | Reisterstown Road; Painters Mill Road | 1987–2008 | Routes 56 and 59 | |
| M-10; Reisterstown Plaza station – Villa Julie College | Cheswolde; Fallstaff; Ranchleigh; Mt. Washington; Greenspring Station | Clarks Lane; Glen Avenue; Greenspring Avenue; Smith Avenue; Falls Road | 1987–2008 | Routes 58 and 60 | |
| M-12; Milford Mill station – Greenwood/Caves Road | Stevenson; Villa Julie College | Stevenson Road; Greenspring Valley Road; Park Heights Avenue | 1987–2005 | Service to Villa Julie replaced by Route M-10 (now Route 60). Service to other parts of line not replaced. | |
| M-13; Milford Mill station – Milford Mill/Bellemore Farms | | Milford Mill Road; Scotts Level Road | 1987–1988 | Route M-1 | |
| M-15; Randallstown – Pikesville/Owings Mills | | Liberty Road; Old Court Road; Reisterstown Road | 1987–1992 | Route M-9 | |
| M-16; Owings Mills station – Reisterstown | | Reisterstown Road | 1987–1997 | Route M-9 (now Route 56) | |
| M-17; Owings Mills station – Owings Mills Town Center | | | 1987–1992 | Routes M-9 and M-16 (now Routes 56 and 59) | |
| M-17; Owings Mills station – Business Center at Owings Mills | Rosewood Center | Red Run Boulevard | 1997–2009 | 59 replaced service on Red Run; no replacement for Rosewood service | |
| P-1; Reisterstown Plaza station – Reisterstown | Pikesville; Owings Mills | Reisterstown Road | 1984–1987 | Routes M-9 and M-16 | |
| P-2; Reisterstown Plaza station – Caves Road | Stevenson | Stevenson Road; Park Heights Avenue | 1984–1987 | Route M-12 (service not provided on this route) | |
| P-3; Reisterstown Plaza station – Greenwood | Stevenson; Villa Julie College | Stevenson Road; Greenspring Valley Road | 1984–1987 | Route M-12 (service to Villa Julie provided by Route 60).) | |
| P-4; Reisterstown Plaza station – Owings Mills Mall | Pikesville | Reisterstown Road; Painters Mill Road | 1984–1987 | Route M-9 (now Route 59) | |
| P-5; Reisterstown Plaza station – Halcyon Gate | | Stevenson Road | 1984–1987 | Route M-12 (service not provided on this route) | |
| P-6; Reisterstown Plaza station – Bellemore Farms | Sudbrook Park | Milford Mill Road; Scotts Level Road | 1984–1987 | Route M-13 | |
| P-7; Reisterstown Plaza station – Ranchleigh | Fallstaff | Clarks Lane | 1984–1987 | Route M-10 (now Route 60) | |
| R-2; Rogers Avenue station – Mt. Washington | Cheswolde | Glen Avenue; Greenspring Avenue; Smith Avenue | 1984–1987 | Route M-5 (now Route 58) | |
| R-3; Rogers Avenue station – Social Security | Howard Park; Gwynn Oak; Woodlawn | Gwynn Oak Avenue | 1984–1987 | Route M-6 | |
| R-4; Rogers Avenue station – Randallstown | Milford Mill; Northwest Hospital | Liberty Road | 1984–1987 | Route M-8 (now Route 54) | |
| A Charles Village – Downtown | Johns Hopkins University; Penn Station | Charles Street | 1915–1947 | Route 11 | |
| B | | Mt. Royal Avenue | 1922–1947 | Routes 28 and 37 (no buses operate on Mt. Royal Avenue; Route 91 operates closest of all parallel routes) | |
| C | Waverly | The Alameda | 1924–1943 | not replaced (other buses operate nearby) | |
| D | Rosemont | Bentalou Street | 1923–1948 | Route 51 | |
| E Randallstown – Gwynn Oak Avenue | Lochearn; Howard Park | Liberty Road | 1931–1948 | Route 54 (now Route 32) | |
| F | Patterson Park | Chester Street | 1924–1950 | Route 33 (now Route 13) | |
| G | Butcher's Hill | Fayette Street | 1925–1949 | Route 17 (now provided by several routes, not including current Route 17) | |
| H | North Point | North Point Road | 1925–1948 | Route 55 (now provided by Route 4) | |
| I | Arlington; Rosemont | Monroe Street; Dolfield Road | 1925–1948 | Route 51 | |
| J Morrell Park – Lansdowne | | Washington Boulevard | 1927–1948 | Route 52 (now provided by Route 36) | |
| K | Mt. Winans | Hollins Ferry Road | 1927–1947 | Route 28 (now Route 51) | |
| L | | Reisterstown Road | 1929–1948 | Route 7 (now Route M-2) | |
| M Pikesville – Glyndon | Owings Mills; Reisterstown | Reisterstown Road | 1932–1948 | Route 5/7 (now Routes 56 and Route 59) | |
| N | | West Baltimore Street | 1932–1948 | Route 20 | |
| O | | Charles Street | 1931–1947 | Route 11 | |
| P | | Eastern Boulevard | 1933–1950 | Route 23 | |
| Q Halethorpe – Downtown | | Wilkens Avenue | 1935–1948 | Route 12 (now Route 35) | |
| R Parkville – Carney | | Harford Road | 1936–1948 | Route 53 (now Route 19) | |
| S Liberty Heights – Bank & Grundy | Druid Park Drive; Erdman Avenue; Edison Highway | Woodberry; Waverly | 1937–1947 | Route 22 | |
| T Waverly – Northwood | | Loch Raven Boulevard | 1940–1947 | Route 3 | |
| U Mannasota – Mayfield | | Shuttle service | 1940–1948 | Route 50 | |
| V | Armistead Gardens | | 1941–1948 | Route 6 (now Route 33) | |
| W | | | 1942–1945 | Route J | |
| X Curtis Bay – Davison Chemical | | Hawkins Point Road | 1946–1950 | Route 63 (now Route 64) | |

== See also ==
- United Railways and Electric Company
