= LocalLink 62 (BaltimoreLink) =

Bus route operated by the Maryland Transit Administration

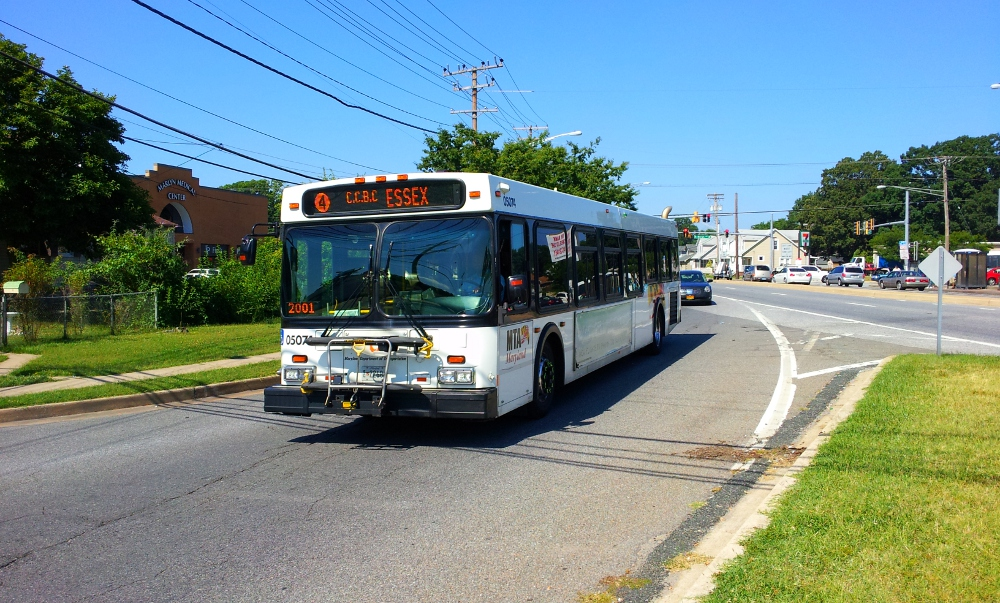

Overview
- System: Maryland Transit Administration
- Garage: Eastern
- Status: active
- Began service: 1971
- Ended service: 2017 (Renumbered to LL 62)
- Predecessors: Bus Route 24; Dundalk Bus Lines

Route
- Locale: Baltimore County
- Communities served: Victory Villa; Middle River; Essex; North Point; Dundalk
- Landmarks served: Franklin Square Hospital; Golden Ring Plaza; Eastpoint Mall; CCBC Dundalk campus
- Other routes: 10, 20, 23, 24, 35, qb40, 55, 160

Service
- Level: Daily
- Frequency: Every 60 minutes Every 40 minutes (peak)
- Weekend frequency: Every 60 minutes
- Operates: 10:30am to 4:42pm

LocalLink 62 is a bus route in the suburbs of Baltimore, United States. The line currently runs from the Essex campus of the Community College of Baltimore County to Turner's Station in Dundalk. The current route serves the Rosedale, Middle River, and Essex areas and the CCBC Essex and Dundalk campuses. The line was previously known as Route 4 prior to the launch of BaltimoreLink. LocalLink Route 62 replaced the entirety of Route 4 on June 18, 2017.

== History ==
Route 62 started operating on November 15, 1971, under the nomenclature of Bus Route 4 between Eastpoint Mall and Dundalk, with southbound trips operating along North Point Road and Wise Avenue, and northbound trips operating along Merritt Boulevard. Another route identified as Route 4A operated briefly between Eastpoint and Logan Village between 1977 and 1978, but it was quickly eliminated.

=== Predecessors ===
Service along North Point Road prior to the existence of route 4 had previously been provided by the Baltimore Transit Company's Route H from 1925 to 1948 and Route 55 (no relationship to current Route 55 that runs from Towson to Fox Ridge) from 1948 to 1952, then by Dundalk Bus Lines.

Service to Ft. Howard Veterans Hospital was added in 1973 after Route 4 absorbed Route 9, which had operated between 1971 and 1973. Ft. Howard had previously been served by streetcars. The no. 26 streetcar line had provided service to Ft. Howard. Service was replaced in 1952 by Dundalk Bus Lines. During this time it was known in the community as 'the blue bus' owing to the color of the buses and to differentiate them from the yellow buses of the Baltimore Transit Company's No. 10 and 20 routes.

The no. 4 designation was used in the past for a line that operated in West Baltimore as a streetcar from 1894 to 1935 and as a bus line from 1935 to 1954. The service was then absorbed into Route 15, which still operates along that route to this day.

=== Elimination of Ft. Howard service ===
In 1993, Route 4 service to Ft. Howard, which had been cut in half less than a year earlier, was eliminated, and service the remaining parts of the line was reduced to one bus every 70 minutes. The proposal to eliminate service to Ft. Howard drew protests that were filmed by local news stations. A private contractor was chartered to provide this service following elimination. In 1997, MTA once again started to run a bus to Ft. Howard. A new Route 6 that ran from Eastpoint Mall to Ft. Howard, mostly via North Point Road, was briefly added in 1997, but was discontinued a year later.

=== Extension to White Marsh ===
In 2000, MTA extended Route 4 from Eastpoint Mall to White Marsh Mall through Essex and Rosedale, and south from the Dundalk loop to Turner's Station, and the route was slightly modified to serve the CCBC Dundalk campus. For the first time, single-seat bus service became available between the two CCBC east-side campuses.

This service initially operated through Essex along Mace Avenue, a street where buses were previously opposed by the community. As a result of community opposition, Route 4 was soon shifted to Rossville Boulevard, the same route as Route 55.

In addition to these extensions, the frequency of service was improved. Rush hour service operated every 40 minutes, and off-peak service hourly. Selected trips also served the Yellow Brick Road industrial Park in Golden Ring.

Service along the original part of the route remain unchanged. Northbound trips continued to follow the Merritt Boulevard corridor, while southbound trips used North Point Road and Wise Avenue, requiring riders to change buses on the same line to return to the area they originally left.

=== Greater Baltimore Bus Initiative changes ===
In 2005, as part of the Greater Baltimore Bus Initiative, Route 4 underwent a major overhaul. This included:

- Shortening the north end of the route. Its original planned terminus was Franklin Square Hospital, but this was later changed to the CCBC Essex Campus in response to complaints of the loss of Route 35 service directly to the campus. Riders wishing to reach White Marsh were directed to transfer to Route 35.
- Northbound trips were to be modified to operate via the southbound route of North Point Road and Wise Avenue. No bus service was provided in the Merritt Boulevard area, and riders wishing to reach this area were directed to walk up to a mile to Eastpoint Mall or Wise Avenue.
- Trips via Yellow Brick Road Industrial Park were eliminated. MTA stated that only 11 riders used this branch daily, requiring of taxpayer subsidy of $5.28 each. In a schedule published in early 2006, a small number of these trips were reinstated.
- Rush hour service was reduced to one bus an hour, which became the frequency at all times. Route 4 alternated buses with Route 24, providing more efficient service on both lines, until February 2009, when Route 24 was shortened. When a Route 4 bus reached the CCBC Essex campus, the next trip made by the vehicle was as Route 24, and vice versa.

=== Middle River modification ===
In February 2009, Route 4 was modified in the Middle River area to serve the corridor of Martin Boulevard that was previously served by the truncated Route 24. Route 24 was later extended in a different direction to Moravia.

=== BaltimoreLink ===
On June 18, 2017, as part of the BaltimoreLink transit system overhaul, Route 4 was replaced in its entirety by LocalLink 62.
