= Morrell Park =

Morrell Park is the name of at least two neighborhoods in the United States:

- Morrell Park, Baltimore

and

- Morrell Park, Philadelphia, Pennsylvania
