= LocalLink 59 (BaltimoreLink) =

Bus route operated by the Maryland Transit Administration

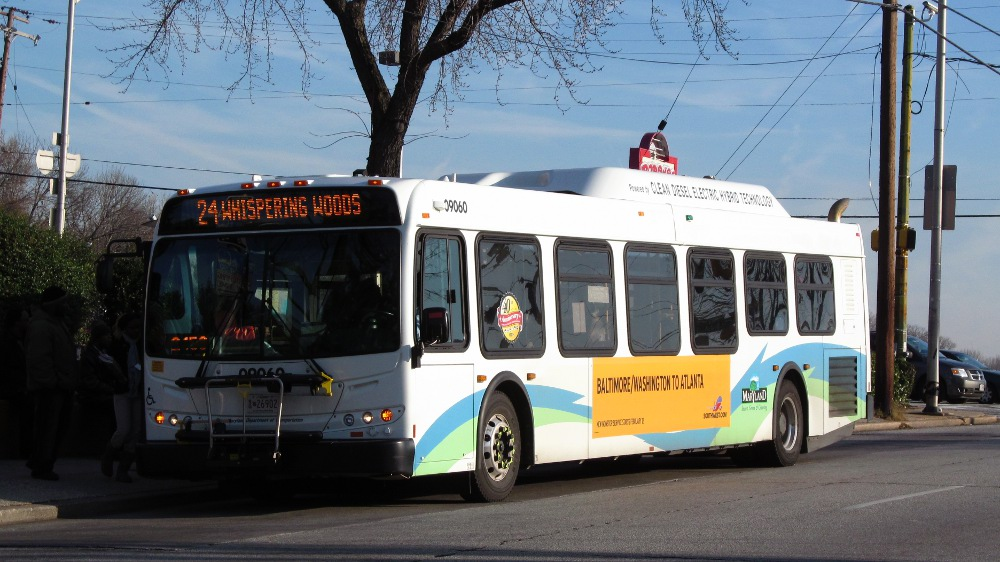

Overview
- System: Maryland Transit Administration
- Garage: Eastern
- Status: active
- Began service: 1988
- Predecessors: Bus Route S

Route
- Locale: Baltimore City; Baltimore County
- Communities served: Parkside Gardens, Armistead; Whispering Woods; Middle River
- Landmarks served: Druid Hill Park; Johns Hopkins University
- Other routes: 4, 5, 33, 35, qb40, 44, qb46, 50, 55, 160

Service
- Level: Daily
- Frequency: Every 60 minutes Every 60 minutes (peak)
- Weekend frequency: Every 60 minutes
- Operates: 5:00 am to 11:00 pm

LocalLink 59 is a bus route operated by the Maryland Transit Administration in Baltimore and its suburbs. The line operates hourly (except overnight) between the Moravia loop in Northeast Baltimore and Whispering Woods, just east of Bowleys Quarters.

== History ==
Route 59 was formed under the name Route 24 in 1988 as a split-off from Route 35, which previously provided the original route of this service, serving Oliver Beach since 1970, and the Town and Country Apartments in Bowleys Quarters since 1971. The line originated from Franklin Square Hospital and then operated through the parking lot of the now defunct Golden Ring Mall, then to a stop in Middle River, where buses made a U-turn, and continued east on Eastern Boulevard to Oliver Beach. This terminus was later scaled back to Tidewater Village, the community now identified as Whispering Woods. Service on this line was provided seven days a week, but less than once an hour, even during rush hour.

Minor improvements to the line were made in its first 17 years, which included a modification in 1993 to serve the Victory Villa community. But its largest growth came in 2005, when a previously unannounced GBBI change was made, in which steady hourly service was provided, and selected trips were routed via Pulaski Industrial Park. This unplanned change was made to settle various complaints from riders losing service on Route 23. This change was cost-efficient as buses alternated between 4 and 24.

In 2006, the layover was moved from Franklin Square Hospital to the CCBC Essex campus to improve exchanges with Route 4 buses.

In February 2009, the line was shortened, as Route 4 was modified to serve the Martin Boulevard corridor. But neither line's frequency was changed.

On August 31, 2009, selected trips on Route 33 to Essex Park-and-Ride which had operated since 2005 were discontinued, and the line was shortened to the Moravia loop. Route 24 was simultaneously extended to this location to replace this service.

In 2017, Route 24 was renamed Route 59 under BaltimoreLink.
