= LocalLink 87 (BaltimoreLink) =

Bus route operated by the Maryland Transit Administration

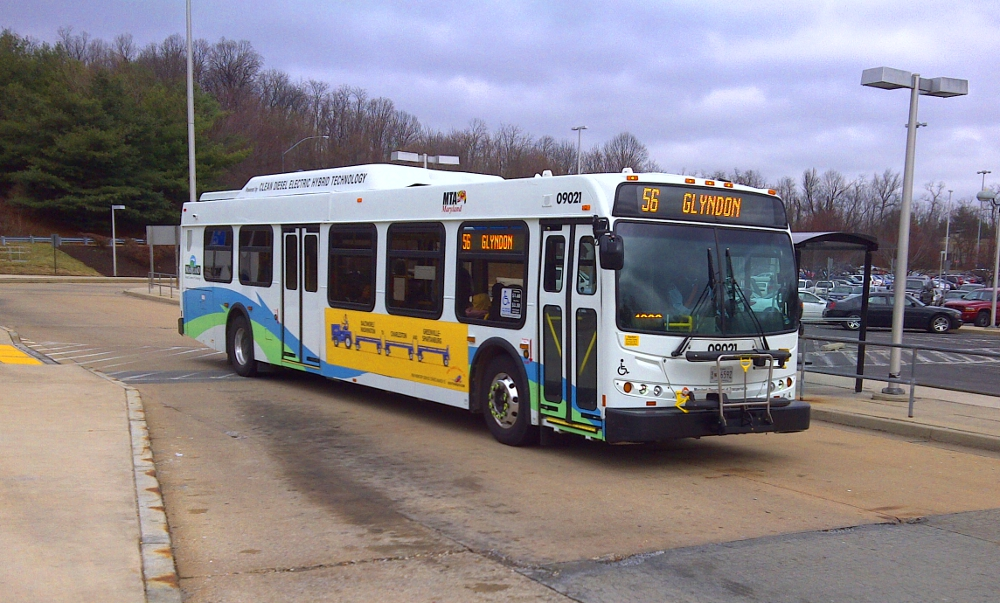

Overview
- System: Maryland Transit Administration
- Garage: Northwest
- Status: Active
- Began service: 2008
- Predecessors: Route M-9 (1997-2008); Route M-16 (1987-1997); Route P-1 (1984-1987); Route 7 (1959-1984); Route 5/7 (1948-1959); Route M (1932-1948); No. 5 Streetcar (1916-1932)

Route
- Locale: Baltimore City; Baltimore County
- Communities served: Owings Mills; Reisterstown
- Other routes: Route 56; 59

Service
- Level: Daily
- Frequency: Every 35 minutes Every 20 minutes (peak)
- Weekend frequency: Every 35 minutes
- Operates: 5:00 am to 1:00 am

LocalLink 87 is a bus route operated by the Maryland Transit Administration in the suburbs of Baltimore. The route currently runs from the Owings Mills Town Center to Glyndon via Reisterstown Road and the Owings Mills Metro Subway Station. The line, which was a split-off from the final version of the now defunct Route M-9, and resembles the former Route M-16 that operated from 1987 to 1998. The route was previously named No. 56 before BaltimoreLink, when it was replaced in its entirety by Route 87.

== History ==
Before BaltimoreLink, Route 87 was operated as Route 56, and has only been operating under this designation since February 17, 2008. Its route, however, has a long history of being served by other bus and streetcar lines.

The no. 56 designation was once previously used in Baltimore transit history for a line that operated from Murray Hill (near Rodgers Forge) to Bedford Square (near Charles Village). This line operated from 1948 to 1953 before being merged into the current Route 11, the main bus route for the Charles Street corridor.

=== 1916 to 1932 ===
Service on Reisterstown Road was provided by the No. 5 Streetcar Line, which ran from Emory Grove to Patterson Park, providing transit along all parts of Reisterstown Road in Baltimore County. The no. 5 streetcar had the most northern terminus of all Baltimore streetcars. At this time, the corridor was far less developed than it is today.

=== 1932 to 1948 ===
In 1932, the no. 5 streetcar was shortened to Pikesville. Service between Pikesville and Emory Grove was provided by Bus Route M (no relationship to M-lines).

=== 1948 to 1959 ===
In 1948, the no. 5 streetcar was completely converted to a bus operated. The new line was identified as the no. 5/7 line.

=== 1959 to 1984 ===
In 1959, the no. 5/7 line was split into two separate lines with these designations. The no. 7 bus line provided service on all parts of Reisterstown Road from Glyndon to Pennsylvania and North Avenues, then continued along Pennsylvania Avenue to downtown Baltimore and Canton along the same route as the present no. 7 line. Even after the line was shortened in 1984 in favor of shorter Metro feeder buses, Route 7 buses continued to operate along this full route hourly on Sundays until 2001, when the Metro connection buses started to operate 7 days a week, some 24 hours a day.

=== 1984 to 1987 ===
On June 18, 1984, in conjunction with the opening of the Baltimore Metro Subway, several bus routes in the northwest section of the Baltimore area, including Route 7, were shortened, and portions of them were replaced with various feeder buses that brought riders into various Metro stations. A new Route P-1 was formed that operated between the new Reisterstown Plaza Metro Subway Station and Reisterstown during Metro's hours of operation.

=== 1987 to 1997 ===
On August 31, 1987, in conjunction with the extension of the Metro to Owings Mills, all P-lines were replaced with M-lines. Route P-1 north of Painters Mill Road was replaced with a new Route M-16, which fed into the new Owings Mills Station. The new M-9 line provided service on Reisterstown Road between Patterson Avenue and Painters Mill Road.

=== 1997 to 2008 ===
In 1997, Route M-16 was combined with Route M-9, which was extended to Reisterstown, with selected trips to Chartley (then a branch of Route M-16). This provided single-seat service along all portions of Reisterstown Road in Baltimore County, as well as improved midday and Saturday service to Route M-16 and to the Owings Mills Town Center. A new Route M-17 was also formed that provided peak hour service to the Owings Mills Corporate Campus and the Business Center at Owings Mills. Sunday service was added in 2001 that was identical to the Saturday schedule.

In 1999, the destination signs on Route M-9 were changed from "Reisterstown" to "Glyndon" to avoid confusion caused by buses along Painters Mill Road and at the Owings Mills Metro Station and Town Center that were traveling in opposite directions (southbound buses had flashed between "Reisterstown" and Plaza Station.".

In 2000, the Chartley branch was discontinued. For a brief period of time, the trips that once operated to Chartley were laying over at a loop near a Food Lion supermarket in Reisterstown, but due to complaints from residents of this neighborhood, these trips were later rerouted to the Glyndon loop along Hanover Pike where all other buses lay over.

In 2007, it was proposed that the line would be split into two routes, numbered 56 and 59, that would be similar to the pre-1997 routes M-9 and M-16, but with higher frequencies. This change, which went into effect on February 17, 2008, was planned in order to improve schedule adherence on both routes. At the same time, trips via Dolfield Road were discontinued, and all trips on Route 56 operate via Painter Mill Road to Reisterstown Road.
