= Rosemont, Baltimore =

Neighborhood in Baltimore, Maryland, US

Coordinates: 39°18′22″N 76°40′17″W

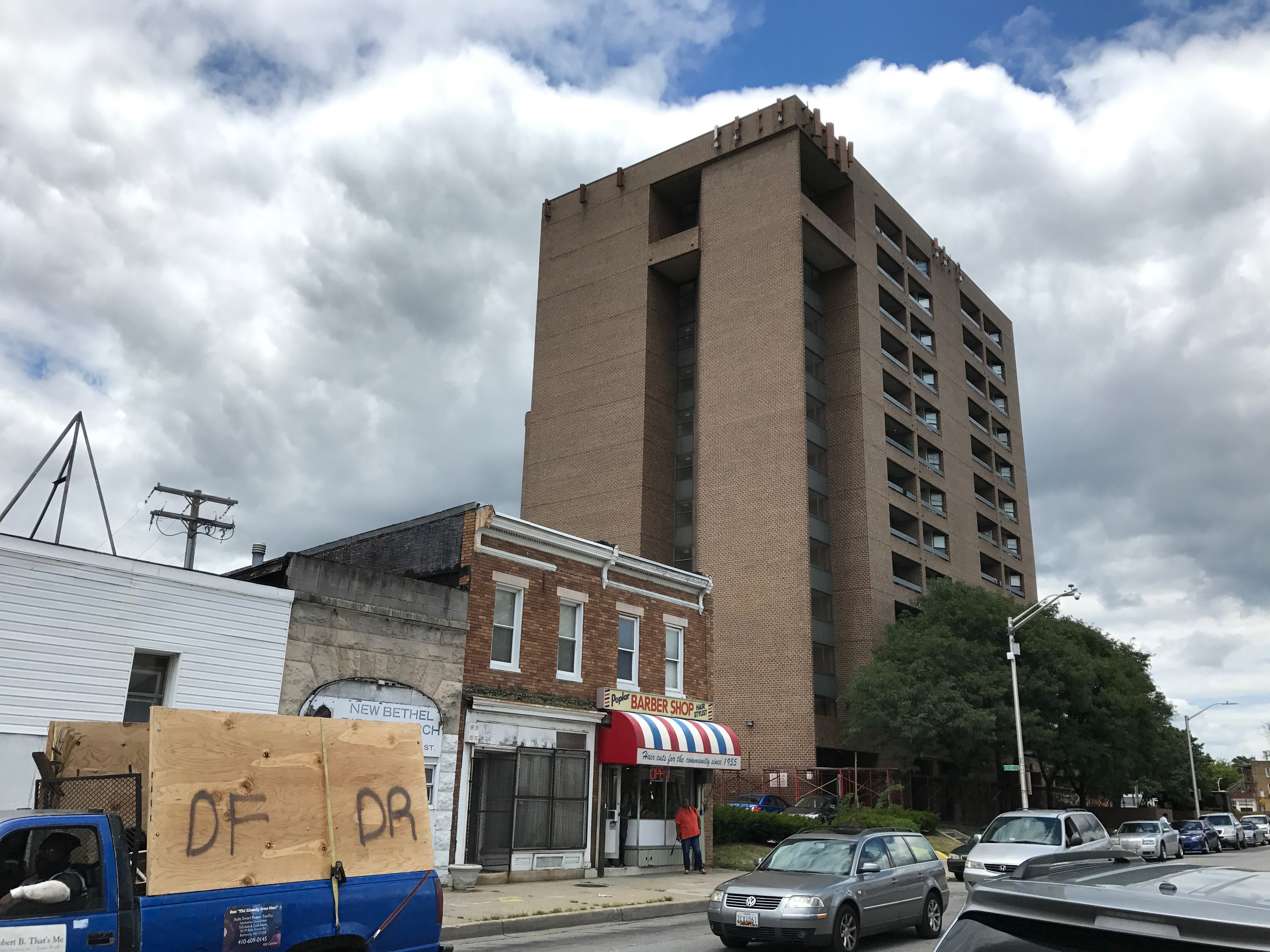
Rosemont Tower and environs in Baltimore

Rosemont is a neighborhood in the western part of Baltimore, Maryland. Located below North Avenue, above Franklintown Road, East of Hilton Parkway, and West of Bloomingdale Avenue it is a working class African-American neighborhood.

It is immediately adjacent to Walbrook Junction and Leakin Park. Though the area was once considered middle-class, it has in the 20th century experienced economic depression, housing abandonment, and increased crime. The neighborhood was affected by the Baltimore riot of 1968.
