= LocalLink 36 (BaltimoreLink) =

Bus route operated by the Maryland Transit Administration

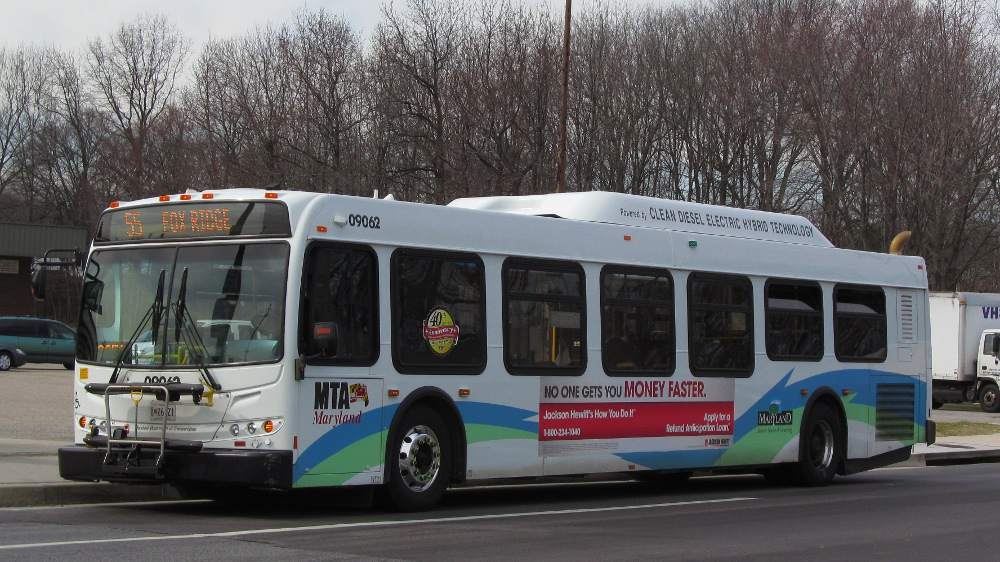

Overview
- System: Maryland Transit Administration
- Garage: Eastern
- Status: active
- Began service: 1973
- Predecessors: Route 55; Bus Route 2

Route
- Locale: Baltimore City; Baltimore County
- Communities served: Hillendale; Hamilton; Overlea; Rosedale; Golden Ring; Essex; Middle River
- Landmarks served: Towson Marketplace; Franklin Square Hospital; CCBC Essex campus Golden Ring Plaza
- Other routes: 3, 4, 8, 11, 12, 15, 19, 23, 24, 35, qb40, qb47, qb48, 58, 104

Service
- Level: Daily
- Frequency: Every 30 minutes Every 20 minutes (peak)
- Weekend frequency: Every 30-60 minutes
- Operates: 5:00 am to 10:30 pm

LocalLink 36 is a bus route operated by the Maryland Transit Administration in Baltimore and its suburbs. The line currently runs from Towson to Fox Ridge, serving Parkville, Overlea, Rosedale, and Essex, and the Essex campus of the Community College of Baltimore County (formerly Essex Community College).

== History ==
Route 36 started operating in 1973 as Route 55 between Overlea and Towson, with branches via Joppa Road and Taylor Avenue, and to Hunt Valley. A year later, as the Route 9 was introduced, the Hunt Valley service on this line was truncated to Towson.

In 1977, Route 55 was combined with Route 2, which had operated limited service between Overlea and Fox Ridge. For the next 20 years, the line operated from the Towson area to Franklin Square Hospital, with selected trips, mostly during rush hour, continuing to Fox Ridge. Express trips to the Essex area from Towson were also introduced, but were eliminated in 1992.

In 1997, all trips were extended to Fox Ridge.

In 1998, two daily trips which operated via Taylor Avenue through Parkville were discontinued.

In 2005, as part of the Greater Baltimore Bus Initiative, it was proposed that Route 55 would operated every 30 minutes versus the previous 40, and Sunday service would be introduced. No routing changes were planned initially to Route 55. But this plan was later delayed due to public outcry over changes to other routes.

In 2006, under a revision, MTA made plans for Route 55 to loop at the Towson Courthouse rather than GBMC, and for service on the remainder of the route to be provided on other lines. This plan was not implemented immediately. But on October 8, 2006, Sunday service was introduced, reflecting this new routing.

On February 17, 2008, these changes were implemented seven days a week, despite public outcry over transfers that would be required to reach Towson University and area hospitals.

On June 18, 2017, BaltimoreLink renamed Route 55 to LocalLink 36.
