= Route 29 (MTA Maryland) =

Bus route operated by the Maryland Transit Administration

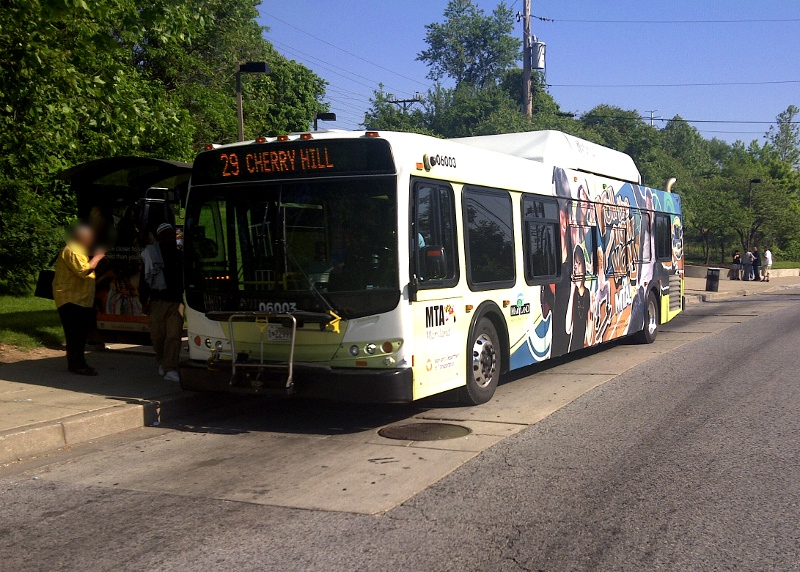
- Route 29 bus at the Cherry Hill Light Rail Station

Overview
- System: Maryland Transit Administration
- Garage: Bush
- Status: Eliminated
- Began service: 1993
- Ended service: 2017
- Predecessors: Bus Routes 28 and 37

Route
- Locale: Baltimore City
- Communities served: Cherry Hill
- Landmarks served: Harbor Hospital Center
- Other routes: 27, 51, 64

Service
- Level: Weekdays and Saturdays
- Frequency: Every 20 minutes Every 20-30 minutes (peak)
- Weekend frequency: Every 20 minutes
- Operates: 5:00 am to 12:00 am WEEKDAYS, 5:00 am to 12:00 am SATURDAYS

Route 29 was a bus route operated by the Maryland Transit Administration in Baltimore. The line operated on weekdays and Saturdays in a circular fashion, linking the Cherry Hill Light Rail Stop to the Cherry Hill community. Two other MTA bus lines, formerly the routes 27 and 51, also served the Cherry Hill area.

== History ==
The Route 29 designation for service in Cherry Hill was around since June 14, 1993. But prior to this date, the Cherry Hill area was served by, and continues to be served by, other routes.

The no. 29 designation was never used for any routes in the Cherry Hill area before. The most notable Baltimore transit route of the past that used the no. 29 designation was the No. 29 Streetcar, which operated from Roland Park to downtown from 1908 to 1947, when it was converted into the No. 29 bus. The no. 29 bus operated until 1959, when it was merged into the No. 6 Bus (now LocalLink 67). The Roland Park bus line was later split again from the no. 6 line in 1977, but it was then designated Route 61. The only other line that was known as Route 29 was an express bus that operated between Timonium and downtown from 1983 to 1988.

Prior to the inception of Route 29, the main bus line serving Cherry Hill was Route 28. Route 28 had operated since 1947 between the Liberty Heights Avenue corridor and Cherry Hill. All buses that had operated from Cherry Hill and other locations in South Baltimore had been given the no. 28 designation. All buses that originated from Liberty Heights with a destination other than Cherry Hill were identified as no. 28. However, all buses that originated in the Liberty Heights area and had a final destination of Cherry Hill were designated no. 37. This was done to alert white residents of the communities in the Liberty Heights area that the bus's final destination was Cherry Hill, then a low class black community. This practice was discontinued in 1974 when the no. 37 designation was dropped, and all buses along this route were given the no. 28 designation.

=== Origin ===
Route 29 started operating in 1993 as a split-off from Route 28, which had been divided when the Light Rail was extended south of Baltimore. On its day of inauguration, the line had operated on all trips between the Cherry Hill and Patapsco Light Rail Stops.

Prior to that day, Route 28 had operated on weekdays from the Mondawmin Metro Subway Station to either Cherry Hill or Baltimore Highlands. On the day of the split, a new Route 30 was also formed that operated between the Cherry Hill and Baltimore Highlands Light Rail Stops.

After the 1993 split, Route 28 continued to operate between Mondawmin and Camden Yards on all trips. Hourly trips continued south of Camden Yards to the Cherry Hill Light Rail Stop in order to provide service along Russell Street. On Sundays, Route 28 followed its old routing to Cherry Hill and Baltimore Highlands.

In 1996, Route 28 was eliminated from service except on Sundays, and replaced with service provided by existing lines or by route modifications. Route 27 was extended to replace the portion of Route 28 along Russell Street, and during late night hours when the light rail was not operating, selected Route 27 trips were extended either to Cherry Hill or Baltimore Highlands.

In 2001, Route 28 Sunday service was also eliminated, leaving Route 28, a major Baltimore transit route that had been operating since 1947, something of the past. Route 30 was also eliminated, and service was replaced by extending Route 51 to the Patapsco Light Rail Stop via the Baltimore Highlands area. Route 27 was extended to serve the Cherry Hill area.

Route 29 had first become a supplemental service that operated on a coordinated schedule with Route 27, but since 2002, Route 29 has been operating in a circular fashion.

In 2005, a Greater Baltimore Bus Initiative plan was proposed that would have once again provided bi-directional routing, and extended selected trips downtown. Later versions of this proposal had other lines providing the service on Russell Street, and Route 29 being extended to Port Covington. None of these plans were implemented. In 2007, GBBI was canceled, and no new plans have been made for Route 29 ever since.

== June 2011 ==
Adjust service frequency to 20 minutes. Selected service to the Cherry Hill Multi-Purpose Center to stop after 3 PM on weekdays, and 1 PM on Saturdays.

== June 2017 ==
In June 2019, Route 29 was eliminated as part of the BaltimoreLink overhaul, which removed this route. Riders were instead instructed to use the LocalLinks 26 and 71.
