= Gwynn Oak, Maryland =

Unincorporated community in Maryland, U.S.

Gwynn Oak is an unincorporated community in the western part of Baltimore County, Maryland, United States. Gwynn Oak is north of Liberty Road and east of Rogers Avenue Windsor Mill Road. Nearby neighborhoods include: Woodlawn, Milford Mill, Windsor Mill, and Garwyn Oaks. The western edge of the community lies just outside Woodlawn town center, north-east of Windsor Mill Road where Woodlawn Drive (formerly MD-126) becomes Gwynn Oaks Avenue. The community was home to the Gwynn Oak Amusement Park, now Gwynn Oak Park.

Significant roads and approximate road borders of the community consist of:

- Garrison Boulevard
- Forest Park Avenue
- Hillsdale Road - Starts from West Forest Park Avenue and ends on Wabash Avenue.
- North Rogers Avenue - Northern Parkway to Gwynn Oak Avenue.
- Gwynn Oak Avenue (in city line)
- Flannery Lane to Gwynndale Avenue

Gwynn Oak

- Windsor Mill Road
- Kernan Drive - A road connecting Security Boulevard to the University of Maryland Rehabilitation and Orthopaedics Institute (formerly Kernan Hospital.)
- Woodlawn Drive
- Gwynn Oak Avenue (In County line)

A Muslim enclave has been created in Gwynn Oak, consisting of Muslim immigrants and African-American converts. The project is led by John Yahya Cason, director of the Islamic Education and Community Development Initiative.
