= MedStar Union Memorial Hospital =

- MedStar Health

Geography
- Location: 201 East University Parkway, Baltimore, Maryland, United States
- Coordinates: 39.3291°N 76.6143°W

Organization
- Care system: Private not-for-profit
- Type: Teaching

Services
- Beds: 192

History
- Opened: 1854

Links
- Website: medstarunionmemorial.org
- Lists: Hospitals in Maryland

MedStar Union Memorial Hospital is a non-profit, acute care teaching hospital located in the North Central section of Baltimore, Maryland. The hospital is a member of MedStar Health, a community-based network of Baltimore/Washington, D.C. area hospitals and other health care services.

In 2014, the magazine U.S. News & World Report ranked the hospital 10th in Maryland, and 9th in the Baltimore metropolitan area. For cardiology, cardiac surgery, and orthopedic surgery, it is ranked among the top 50 hospitals in the U.S..

Jazz leader Chick Webb worked in the hospital as a youngster, and Mickey Mantle received treatment at the hospital. In 1939, the gangster Al Capone spent time at the hospital to cure his paresis caused by syphilis, after his release from Alcatraz, after which he donated two cherry trees to the hospital. One tree was later cut down to allow the construction of a new wing of the hospital.
