= Wagner's Point, Baltimore =

Industrial area in Baltimore, Maryland, United States

Coordinates: 39°14′4″N 76°34′8″W

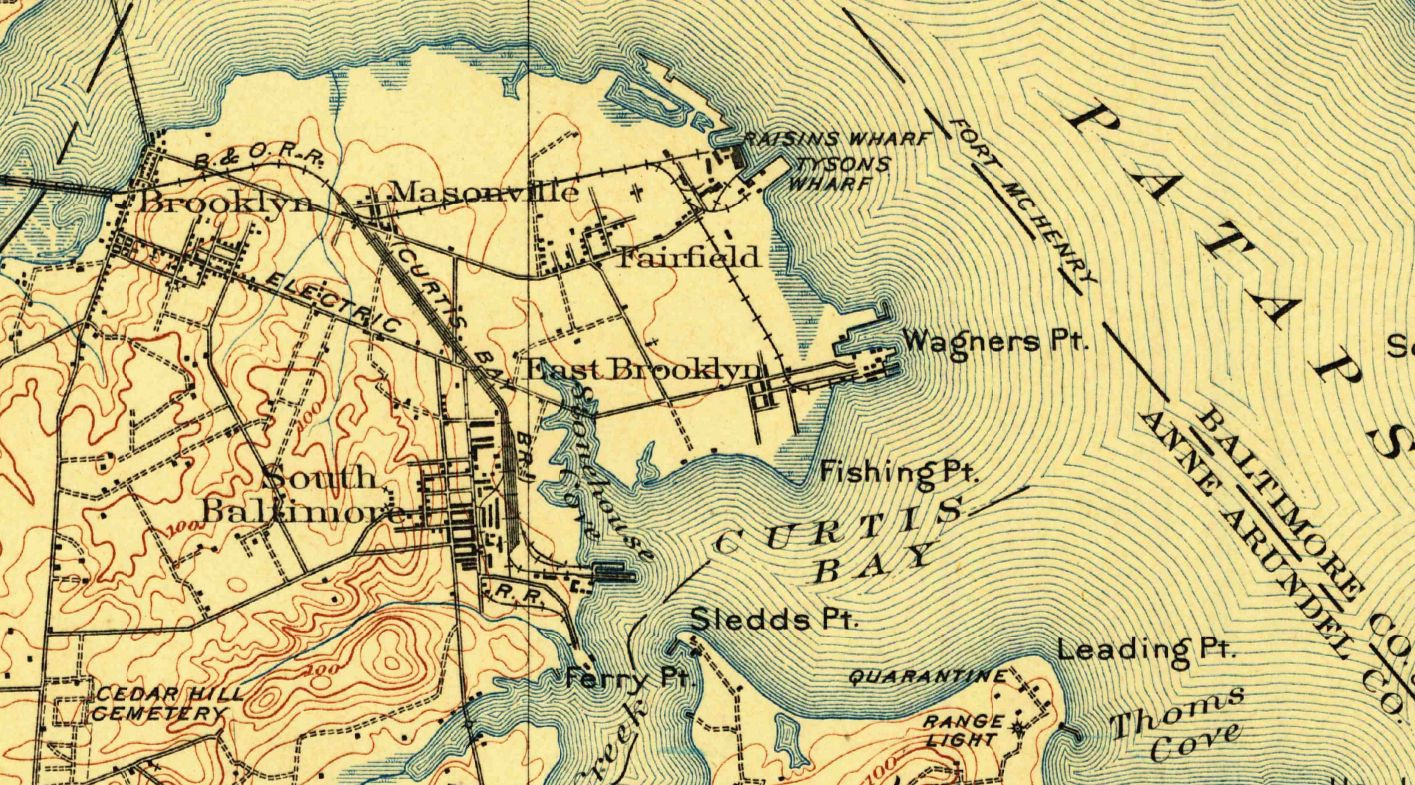
Wagner's Point is visible on this map from 1907

Wagner's Point is an industrial area in Baltimore, Maryland.

The name of the area comes from the Martin Wagner Company, which operated a beef packing plant there before the property was acquired by the Baltimore City government. The Martin Wagner plant was destroyed by a fire in 1913. The City of Baltimore operates its Patapsco Waste Water Treatment Plant on the former Martin Wagner site.

Until the late 1990s Wagner's Point included a residential community which was relocated by the City due to environmental concerns. Negotiations with the final 270 residents of Wagner's Point over the city's buyout were bitterly disputed. Representatives of the residents walked out of the third negotiation session on September 17, 1998. Houses of the former residents were demolished after the city's buyout of the properties.

== See also ==
- Old Town Mall
- Urban decay
