= Gwynn Oak Park =

Park in Maryland, United States

Coordinates: 39.327°N 76.716°W

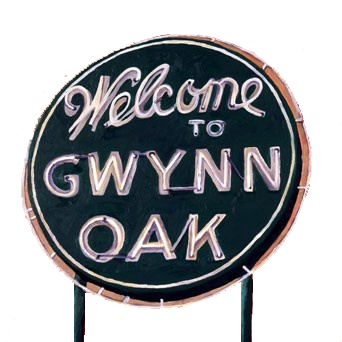
Sign at entrance to Gwynn Oak Amusement Park

Gwynn Oak Park is a park that was the site of a privately owned amusement park, located in the community of Gwynn Oak, just outside northwest Baltimore, Maryland, in Baltimore County. The 64-acre (260,000 m^{2}) park is at the corner of Gwynn Oak and Gwyndale avenues, about a quarter mile off of Liberty Heights Avenue. The amusement park, which existed from 1893 until 1973, was the site of protests against racial segregation due to a whites-only admissions policy.

== History ==
In its heyday, the amusement park featured three roller coasters: the Big Dipper, the Little Dipper, and the Wild Mouse. The park also featured common amusement rides such as the Ferris wheel and the Whip (see photograph at right). It also had a trolley, a carousel, and the dance hall known as the "Dixie Ballroom". WFBR, a Baltimore AM radio station, did live broadcasts from the ballroom on weekends.

In the late 1950s and early 1960s, Gwynn Oak Park was the subject of picketing for integration, as it remained segregated until August 28, 1963, when Sharon Langley (accompanied by her father Charles Langley) became the first African American child to ride the park's merry-go-round on the first day the park was officially open to all. In 1955, Baltimore City clergy, along with local chapters of the civil rights group Congress of Racial Equality (CORE), with assistance from the NAACP, demonstrated for integration at Gwynn Oak Park. These protests were held at various times over the years, but two major demonstrations occurred at Gwynn Oak Park in July 1963. For the first, on Thursday, July 4, 1963, demonstrators initially gathered at Orchard Street United Methodist Church in West Baltimore before boarding buses to the park. Over the course of the protest, 283 people were arrested and charged with trespassing outside the park. The demonstration remained peaceful, as many arrested were clerics from all over the East Coast. Two members of the Episcopal Church's National Council staff, Bishop Daniel Corrigan and Father Daisuke Kitagawa, executive secretary of the Division of Domestic Missions, were also among the group arrested. The second demonstration took place on Sunday, July 7, 1963. Counter-protestors had turned out in number and the police feared for a time that violence might erupt. One demonstrator was injured by a thrown stone. More than 90 demonstrators and four counter-protestors were arrested in the July 7 demonstration.

The park closed in 1973 after suffering severe damage from flooding when Hurricane Agnes caused the Gwynns Falls creek to overflow. In 1974 its rides were auctioned off. The carousel was moved and is still in operation on the National Mall in Washington, D.C. The land is currently owned by the Baltimore County government and utilized as open space picnic ground. Gwynns Falls creek runs through the former amusement park and supplies a lake which leads to a man-made waterfall.

== In popular culture ==
In John Waters' movie Hairspray, the "Tilted Acres" scene is based on Gwynn Oak Amusement Park in 1962.

== Bibliography ==
- Nathan, Amy (2011). Round and Round Together: Taking a Merry-Go-Round Ride into the Civil Rights Movement. Philadelphia: Paul Dry Books. ISBN 9781589882829.
