= Old Court station =

Metro SubwayLink station

Old Court
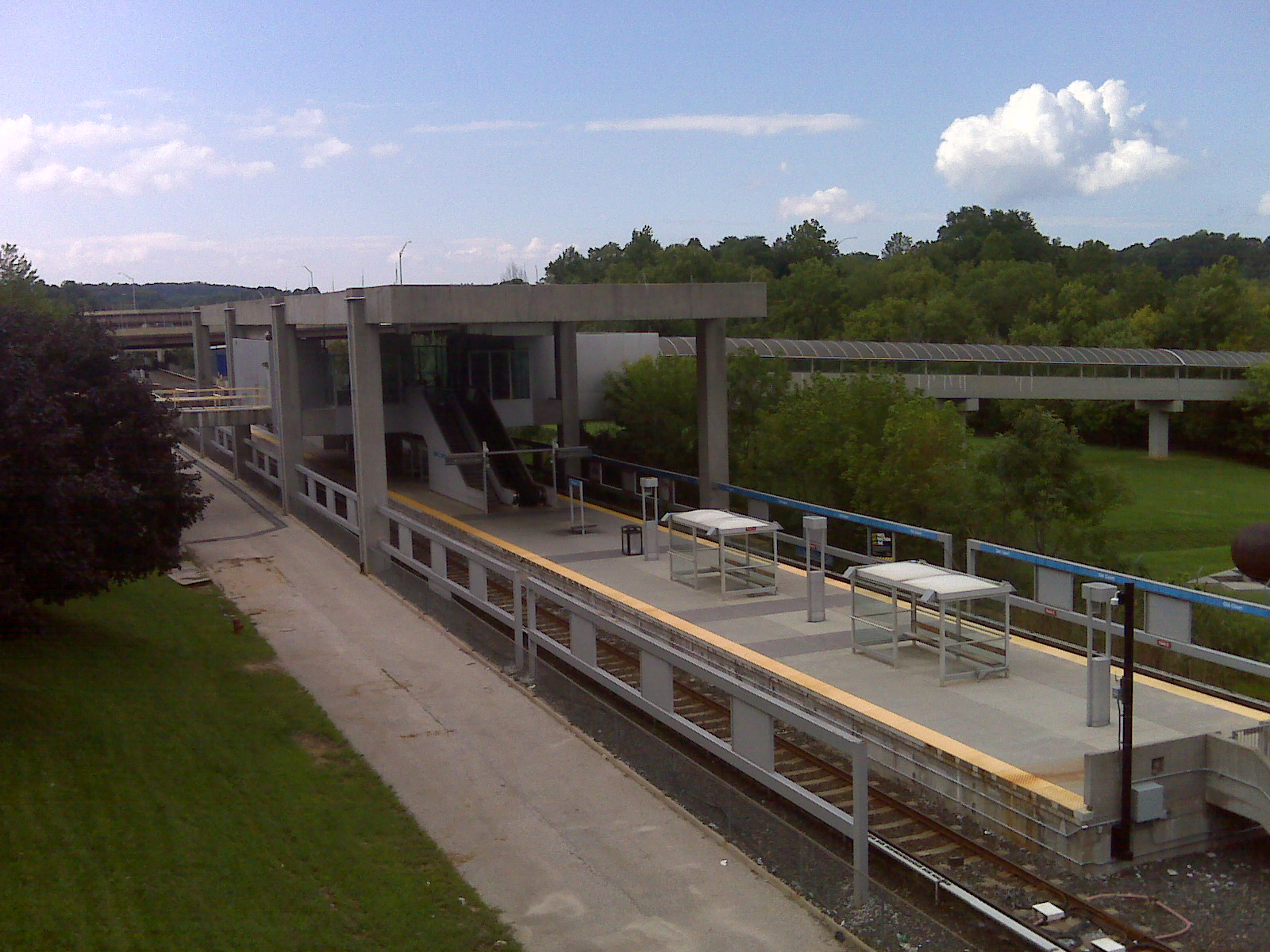
- Old Court station as viewed from Old Court Road. Its access point is via the covered bridge running right in the photo to the bus terminal.

General information
- Location: 4300 Old Court Road; Lochearn, Maryland 21208
- Coordinates: 39°22′17″N 76°44′39″W
- Owner: Maryland Transit Administration
- Platforms: 1 island platform
- Tracks: 2

Construction
- Parking: 625 spaces
- Accessible: Yes

History
- Opened: July 1987

Passengers
- 2017: 1,072 daily

Services
Preceding station	Maryland Transit Administration	Following station
Owings Mills Terminus	Metro SubwayLink	Milford Mill toward Johns Hopkins Hospital
Location

Old Court station is a Metro SubwayLink station in Lochearn, Maryland. It is the second most northern and western station on the line, with approximately 625 parking spaces.

Three buses currently serve this station:

- 92 to Scotts Level Road (SB/WB)/ Velvet Valley (NB) or Glen Avenue (EB)
- 83 to Mondawmin Metro Subway Station (SB)
- 37 to Patapsco Light Rail Stop (SB)

== Nighttime closure ==
In 1993, in order to save costs, Old Court was one of three Metro stations that closed at 8 PM. In 2001, the station once again remained open until midnight.
