= Milford Mill station =

Metro SubwayLink station

Milford Mill
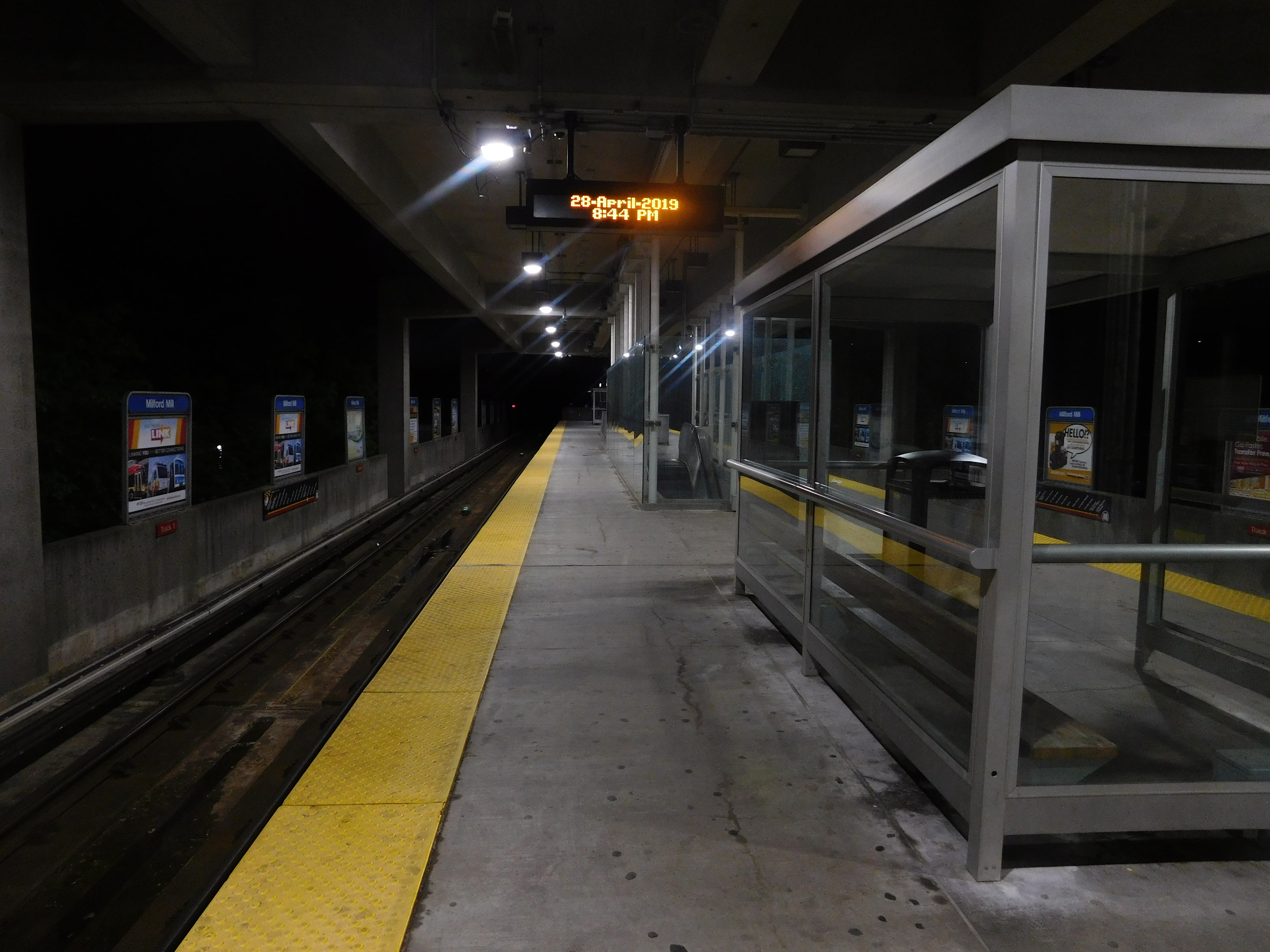
- Milford Mill station in April 2019.

General information
- Location: 4400 Milford Mill Road; Lochearn, Maryland 21208
- Coordinates: 39°21′34.9″N 76°43′14.2″W
- Owner: Maryland Transit Administration
- Platforms: 1 island platform
- Tracks: 2

Construction
- Parking: 1300 spaces
- Accessible: Yes

History
- Opened: July 1987

Passengers
- 2017: 1,454 daily

Services
Preceding station	Maryland Transit Administration	Following station
Old Court toward Owings Mills	Metro SubwayLink	Reisterstown Plaza toward Johns Hopkins Hospital
Location

Milford Mill station is a Metro SubwayLink station in Lochearn, Maryland. It is the twelfth station on the line going outbound and the third going inbound, and has approximately 1300 parking spaces.

== Artwork ==
The Maryland Transit Administration commissioned artist Norman Kenneth Carlberg to create artwork for Milford Mill station. His abstract sculpture "Uno Y Dos," constructed from painted stainless steel, can be seen outside the station.
