= Hillen, Baltimore =

Coordinates: 39°20′24″N 76°35′26″W

Hillen
- Neighborhood of Baltimore
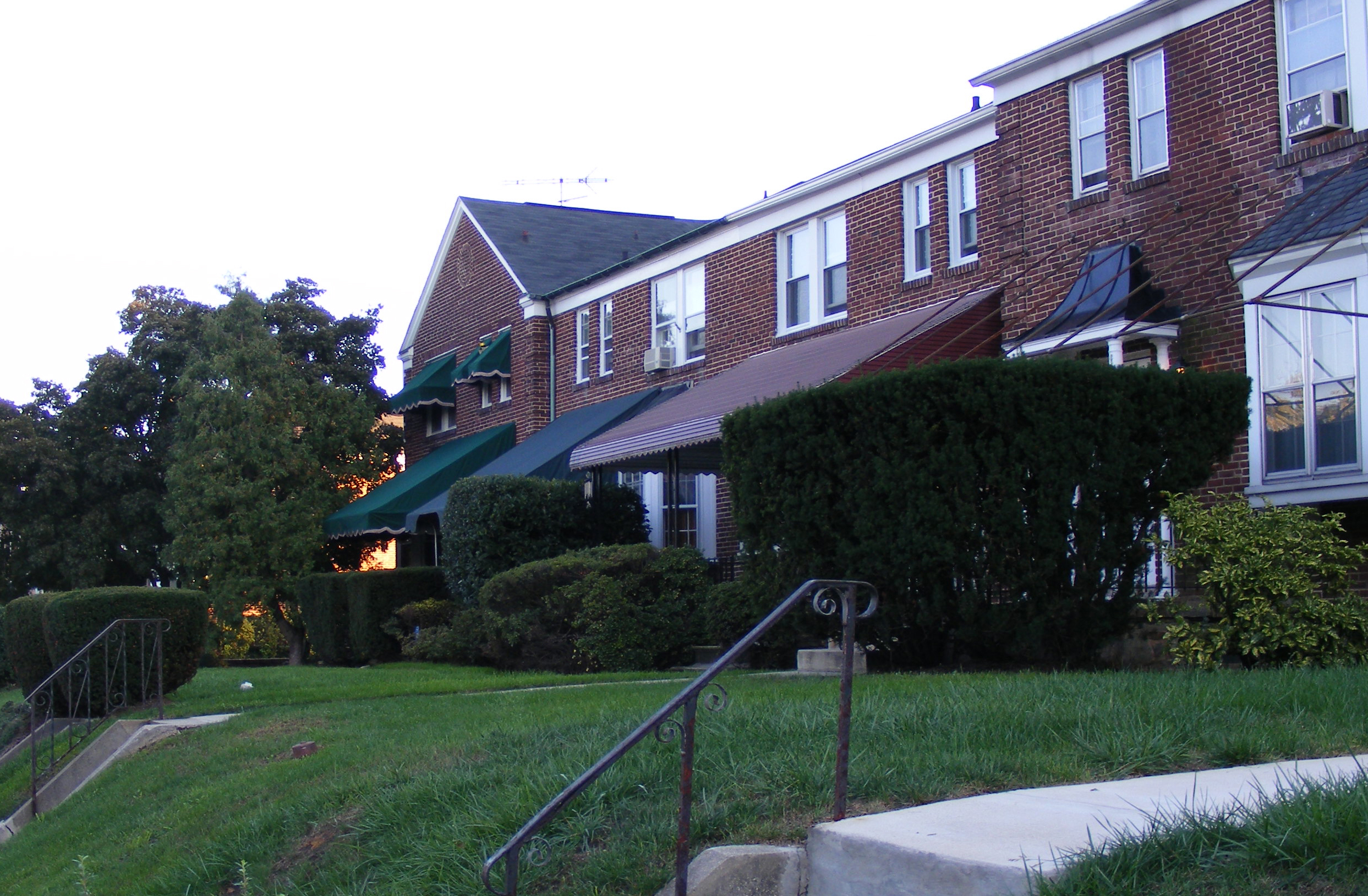
- Houses in Hillen

- Location within Baltimore
- Country: United States
- State: Maryland
- City: Baltimore
- Time zone: UTC-5 (Eastern)
  - Summer (DST): EDT
- ZIP code: 21218
- Area code: 410, 443, and 667

Hillen is a small community just west of Hillen Road and Morgan State University and south of Coldspring Lane in Baltimore, Maryland, United States.

== Demographics ==
According to the 2000 US Census, 2,670 people live in Hillen with 90.4% African-American and 6.6% White. The median household income is $50,417. 91.6% of the houses are occupied and 78.1% of them are occupied by the home's owner.

=== Notable residents ===
- Curt Anderson -member, Maryland House of Delegates
- Joan Carter Conway -member, Maryland State Senate

== History ==
Hillen Road is named for the Hillen Estate. The Hillen family included Colonel Solomon Hillen and Solomon Hillen, Jr., who served as a member of the United States Congress and mayor of Baltimore during the 1840s.

== Government Representation ==
Community	State District	Congressional District	City Council District
Hillen Road	43rd	7th	3rd, 14th
Representatives	Anderson, Doory, McIntosh	Cummings	Curran, Clarke
