= Cedonia, Baltimore =

Region of Baltimore, Maryland, US

Coordinates: 39.33118°N 76.5324°W

Cedonia is a region of Northeastern Baltimore, Maryland, consisting of the neighborhoods of Cedmont, Cedonia, and Frankford. It is located east of Belair Road, above Herring Run Park, and west of the Baltimore City/County Line. It is a predominantly residential area with neighborhoods that range from middle class to lower income.
