= Loch Raven, Maryland =

Neighborhood in Maryland, U.S.

Coordinates: 39°25′08″N 76°32′07″W

Loch Raven is a neighborhood extending from northeast Baltimore to the eastern part of Baltimore County, in Maryland. The major road in the neighborhood is Loch Raven Boulevard, which stretches all the way from the I-695 beltway in Baltimore County to 25th Street in Baltimore City. It is located in the Baltimore Metro Area, and is considered one of the longest roads in the area with many different aspects of Baltimore that can be seen by riding through the area. This region is a diverse, but predominantly African American part of the city and county, and is also the area that consists of a large amount of Morgan State University students. The zip codes assigned to this area are 21218, 21239, 21286, 21284, and 21234, which is also a Parkville Zip Code.
