= Morrell Park, Baltimore =

Morrell Park
- Neighborhood of Baltimore
- Location within Baltimore
- Country: United States
- State: Maryland
- City: Baltimore
- Time zone: UTC-5 (Eastern)
  - Summer (DST): EDT
- ZIP code: 21230
- Area code: 410, 443, and 667

Morrell Park is a neighborhood community located in southwest Baltimore, Maryland, United States.

== History and geography ==
Morrell Park, together with Westport, Violetville, and Mount Winans, were originally part of a tract of land named "Georgia," or "Georgia Plantation," and later called "Mount Clare." This survey, which measured 2,368 acres (9.58 km^{2}), was deeded to Dr. Charles Carroll in 1732. Essentially, it is a hill.

The current Morrell Park is bounded by Hollins Ferry Road, the B&O Railroad tracks and Gwynns Falls to the east, I-95 to the north, Caton Avenue to the west and CSX Transportation tracks to the south.

At one point the neighborhood had trolley tracks running down Washington Boulevard; today the only mass transit serving the neighborhood is MTA Bus line 36, formerly MTA Bus line 11.

Its estimated mortgage is $469. Its estimated rent is $1,135. 67 percent of people own homes in Morrell Park. The common home is a Rowhouse. The median house purchase price is $68,750.

== Schools ==
Morrell Park has one public school in the neighborhood, Morrell Park Elementary/Middle School. Digital Harbor High School serves Morrell Park families, although it is not located in the neighborhood.

== Recreation ==
Morrell Park ' community center cost over 4.5 million dollars

== Churches ==
- Church On The Boulevard (formerly Evangelical Bible Church) / 2444 Washington Boulevard / 21230
- New Covenant Community United Church (formerly St. Marks United Church of Christ) / 1805 Wickes Avenue / 21230
- New Beginnings Seventh-Day Adventist Church (formerly Sexton United Methodist Church) / 1721 Sexton Street / 21230
- The Purpose Center / 2728 Washington Blvd / 21230
