= MedStar Harbor Hospital =

Coordinates: 39.2521°N 76.6139°W

- MedStar Health

Geography
- Location: 3001 S Hanover St, Baltimore, Maryland, United States

Organization
- Type: Teaching

Services
- Beds: 139

History
- Founded: 1903

Links
- Website: medstarharbor.org
- Lists: Hospitals in Maryland

MedStar Harbor Hospital is a private nonprofit, 150-bed, acute care teaching hospital in Baltimore City, Maryland, U.S. It is located on South Hanover Street along the Middle Branch of the Patapsco River in the Cherry Hill neighborhood of South Baltimore. The hospital has around 10,000 inpatients admissions and close to 60,000 emergency department visits per year. Its areas of specialty include orthopaedics, oncology, women's services, cardiology, internal medicine and neurosurgery. Harbor Hospital also offers a medical residency program in internal medicine and a transitional program that prepares residents to specialize in other areas.

== History ==
Originally named South Baltimore Eye, Ear, Nose and Throat Hospital, the hospital was established by physician Harry Peterman in 1903. It was located on Light Street in what was then an industrial area of Baltimore City. When the hospital outgrew its original location, it purchased 12 acres (4.9 ha) from Broening Park, formerly the site of the Maryland Yacht Club. Construction of the present MedStar Harbor Hospital began in 1967 and was completed in 1968. The present location's proximity to the Inner Harbor inspired the name, Harbor Hospital.

In 1996, Harbor Hospital became part of Helix Health, a regional health care network. Helix merged with Medlantic Healthcare Group in 1998 and in 1999 was renamed MedStar Health.

== Services offered ==
Harbor Hospital offers the following services:

- Arthritis & Osteoporosis Center
- Cancer Center—The Cancer Center recently received a full three-year accreditation from the Commission on Cancer (CoC) of the American College of Surgeons.
- Cardiology
- Diabetes
- Emergency department
- Gastroenterology/hepatology
- Lung Cancer Center
- Neonatal Care Unit
- Neurosurgical care
- Orthopaedics
- Pediatrics
- Rehabilitation services
- Pulmonary rehabilitation
- Sleep Center
- Stroke—MedStar Harbor Hospital is certified as a primary stroke center by the Joint Commission.
- Obstetrics and gynecology services

== Accreditation and recognition ==
MedStar Harbor Hospital is accredited by the Joint Commission, an independent, nonprofit organization that evaluates and accredits health care programs in the United States.

Harbor Hospital has been awarded the Delmarva Foundation Quality Excellence Award, an independent, nonprofit organization dedicated to health care quality improvement. It has earned the award eight times, (2001, 2006, 2007, 2008, 2010, 2011, 2012 and 2013) more than any other hospital in the Delmarva area, including Maryland, Washington D.C., and Delaware.
