= Reisterstown Plaza station =

Metro SubwayLink station

Reisterstown Plaza
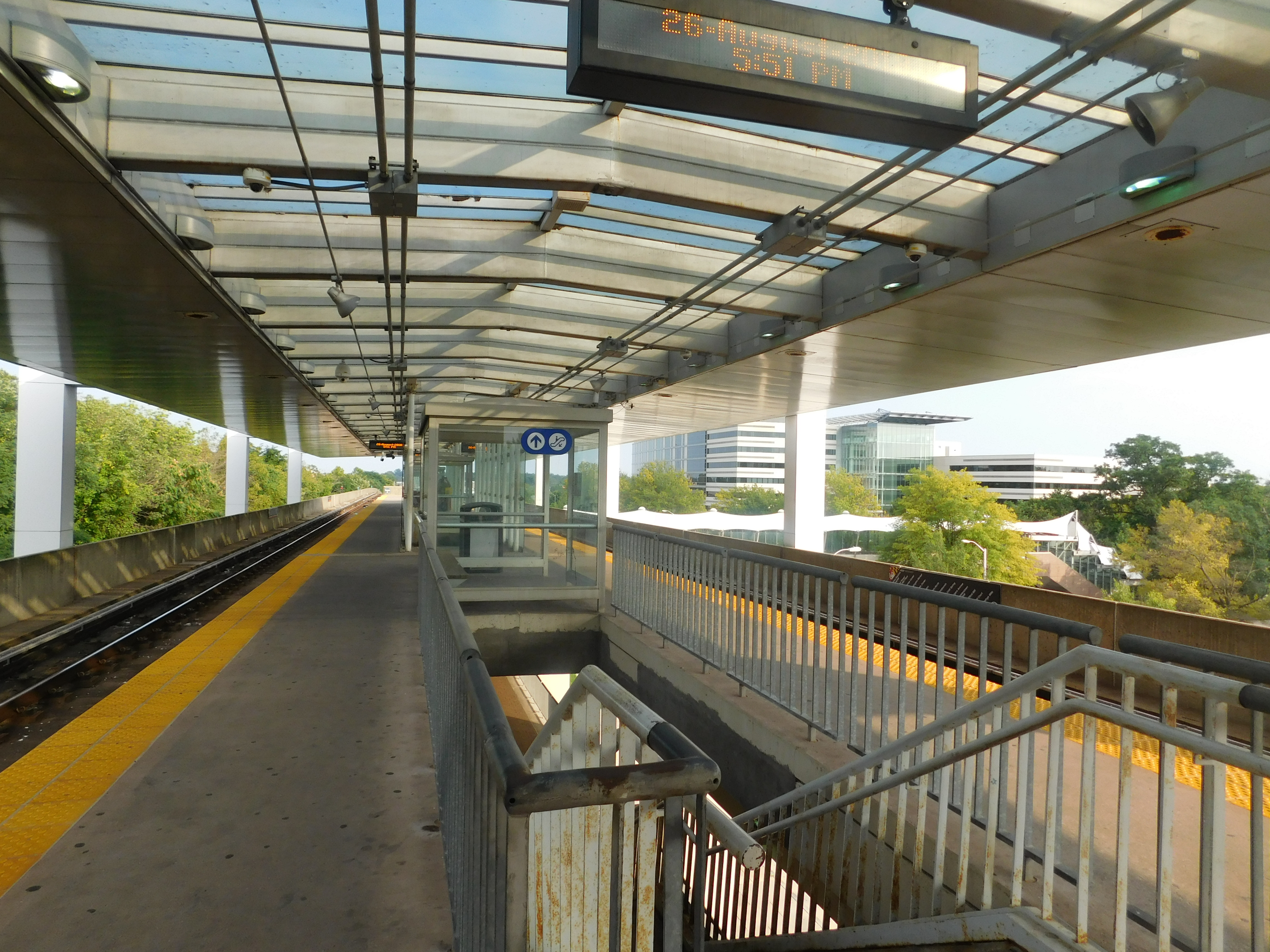
- Reisterstown Plaza station from the platform

General information
- Location: 6301 Wabash Avenue; Baltimore, Maryland, 21215
- Coordinates: 39°21′7.0″N 76°42′17.0″W
- Owner: Maryland Transit Administration
- Platforms: 1 island platform
- Tracks: 2

Construction
- Parking: 700 spaces
- Accessible: Yes

History
- Opened: November 21, 1983

Passengers
- 2017: 1,695 daily

Services
Preceding station	Maryland Transit Administration	Following station
Milford Mill toward Owings Mills	Metro SubwayLink	Rogers Avenue toward Johns Hopkins Hospital
Location

Reisterstown Plaza station is a Metro SubwayLink station in Baltimore, Maryland. It is located at the intersection of Patterson and Wabash Avenues, and is the fourth most northern and western station on the line, with approximately 700 parking spaces.

The station is within a close distance to the Reisterstown Road Plaza, for which it is named. It is also near the northwest division of the Maryland Transit Administration, where buses are stored.

One bus currently serves this station: Route 82, to Monte Verde (SB).

== History ==
Prior to 1987, when the Metro was extended to Owings Mills, the Reisterstown Plaza station was the final stop on the line in the northwestern direction.

In 1993, the Reisterstown Plaza station started to close early at 8 PM in order to save costs, and buses were extended to the Rogers Avenue station at the time. Within a few years, this early closure was abolished, and the station started to remain open until midnight again.

== Nearby points of interest ==
- Baltimore City District Courthouse Wabash Division Courthouse
- Social Security Administration
- Reisterstown Road Plaza
- American Red Cross
- Food and Drug Administration District Office
- NAACP
