= Walbrook, Baltimore =

Neighborhood in Baltimore

Coordinates: 39°18′37″N 76°39′51″W

Walbrook
- Neighborhood of Baltimore
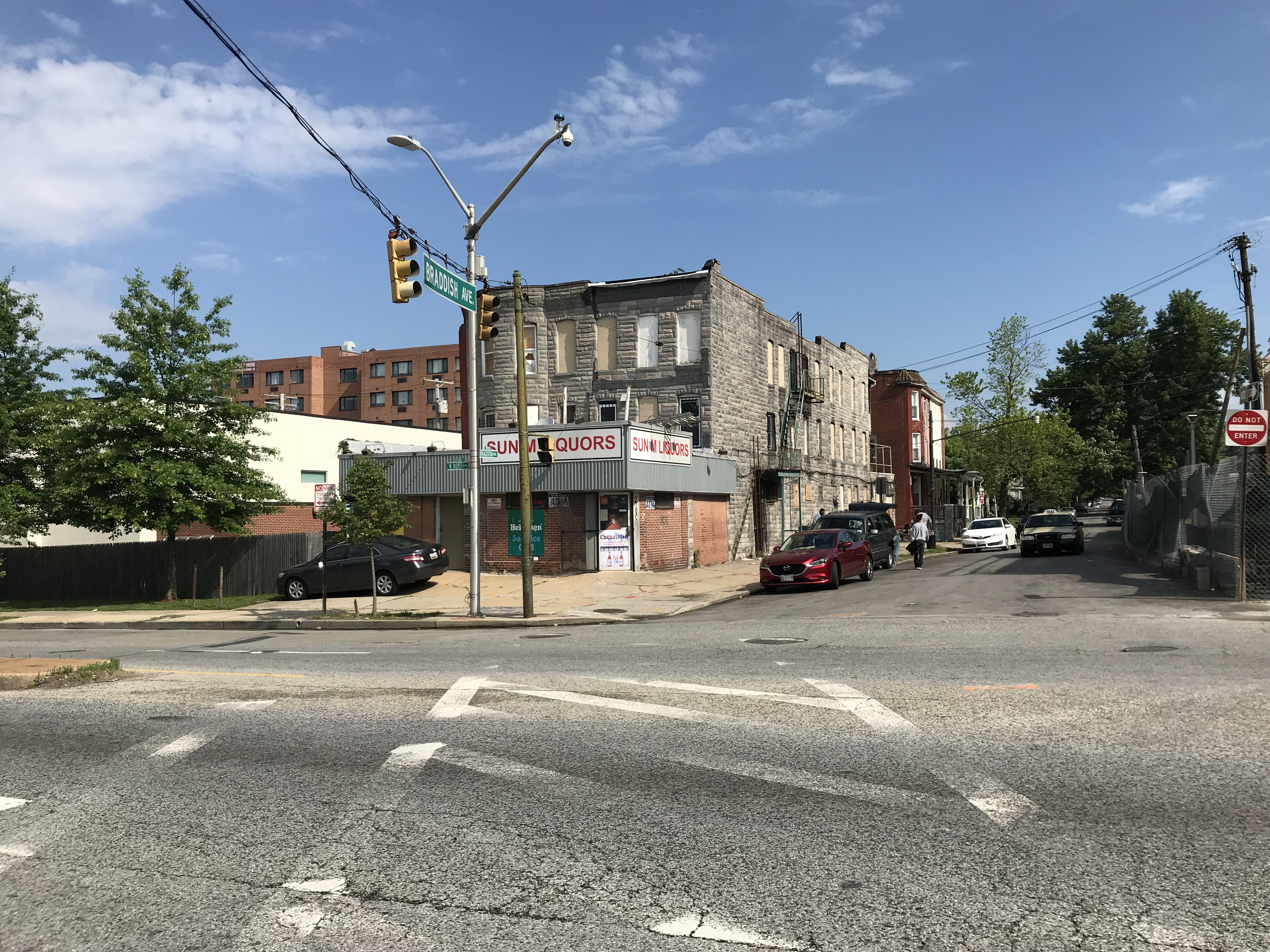
- Buildings on the 2700 block of North Avenue near the intersection with Braddish Avenue in Walbrook, Baltimore

- Location within Baltimore Location within Maryland Location within the United States
- Country: United States
- State: Maryland
- City: Baltimore
- Time zone: UTC−5 (Eastern)
  - Summer (DST): UTC−4 (EDT)
- Area Codes: 410, 443, 667

Walbrook is a neighborhood in West Baltimore, located along West North Avenue. Coppin State University is located in Walbrook, and the neighborhood was also the namesake of the former Walbrook High School.

Several major streets, North Avenue, Windsor Mill Road, Bloomingdale Road, and Hilton Street, meet in the Walbrook area in a location known as Walbrook Junction. This area serves as a transportation hub for the Maryland Transit Administration. It is the western terminus for Bus Route 13, and is also served by Bus Routes 15, 16, 91, and 97.
