= Windsor Mill Road =

Road in Maryland

Coordinates: 39°20′0.5″N 76°44′44″W

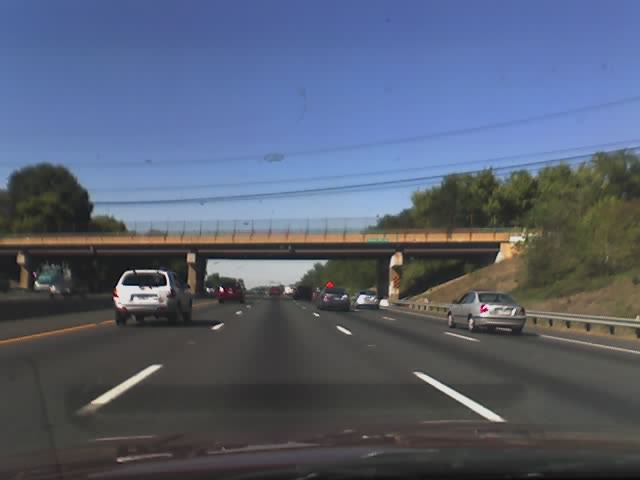
- The Windsor Mill Road overpass over I-695
- Interactive map of Windsor Mill Road
- Location: Baltimore
- Postal code: 21244, 21207, 21216
- West end: Old Court Road
- East end: Edgewood Street

Windsor Mill Road is a road that runs through parts of Baltimore, Maryland and its western suburb Woodlawn. The road starts as a one-way street named Edgewood Street, then makes a slight left corner and becomes Windsor Mill Road. The road, which is approximately 7 1/2 miles in length, runs parallel to nearby Liberty Road and Security Boulevard, and is often used as an alternative to these routes. Though Windsor Mill Road has no interchange with the Baltimore Beltway, it crosses over the highway, and this point is frequently mentioned in traffic reports.

Windsor Mill Road once continued east to near the intersection of Pennsylvania and Fremont Avenues; a short piece survives as School Street. The road is an old one, existing prior to the founding of Baltimore in 1729.

Currently, Windsor Mill Road begins near Walbrook Junction in West Baltimore as a one-way street for several blocks, but becomes a larger two-way road at Gwynns Falls Parkway and crosses under a large arch bridge carrying Clifton Avenue. It then proceeds as a winding road, passing two city parks: Gwynns Falls Park and Leakin Park.

After passing the two parks, Windsor Mill Road runs mostly straight with few curves. The road is lined mostly with single-family houses, apartments, and small shops and shopping centers throughout its duration.

Then passing Forest Park Avenue, it crosses the Baltimore County line between Kernan and Forest Park Avenues in the Woodlawn area, run by motorists in the area.

The main part of Windsor Mill Road ends at Old Court Road. There is no traffic light at this intersection. However, Windsor Mill Road continues for two more blocks beyond Old Court as a side street that is Inwood Road.

== Major intersections ==
- Edgewood Street - A road starts at Clifton Avenue with a one-way street to Gwynns Falls Parkway. (Walbrook Junction)
- Forest Park Avenue and Ingleside Avenue
- Woodlawn Drive/Gwynn Oak Avenue
- Essex Road/Featherbed Lane/St Lukes Lane/Windsor Boulevard/Lugine Avenue
- Rolling Road
- Old Court Road (after Old Court Road, Windsor Mill Road as a side street, to the name Inwood Road)

== Landmarks ==
=== Parks ===
Two well-known parks, Gwynns Falls and Leakin Park, are located along Windsor Mill Road in Baltimore City. The parks have more than 1,000 acres (4.0 km^{2}) of land combined. Leakin Park is home to the Gwynns Falls Trail, that runs through Leakin Park, and the annual Baltimore Herb Festival.

=== Other ===
- Kernan Hospital
- Windsor Mill Middle School

Woodlawn middle school Powhatan elementary Northwest academy

== Gwynns Falls Parkway ==
When traveling westbound on Windsor Mill Road, after passing the parks, Windsor Mill Road crosses Baltimore County after Forest Park Avenue. The road continues around Windsor Mill, Maryland and travels away to Randallstown, Maryland after passing Rolling Road with many land and new houses with a new school called Windsor Mill Middle School.

When traveling eastbound on Windsor Mill Road, after passing the parks, Windsor Mill Road becomes one way facing in the other direction. At this point, a right turn would bring the motorist onto Lyndhurst Avenue, which continues to an intersection at Clifton Avenue. A left turn, which is more common, and is permitted without stopping, will bring the motorist onto Gwynns Falls Parkway, a major road that continues west–east for about two miles (3 km) up until the entrance to Druid Hill Park and the Maryland Zoo in Baltimore after City home communities. Gwynns Falls Parkway is a multi-lane divided road that is mostly lined with residential development. Major landmarks on Gwynns Falls Parkway include:

- Mondawmin Mall
- Coppin State University
- Frederick Douglass High School
- Gwynns Falls Elementary School
