= The Centre at Golden Ring =

Shopping mall in Maryland

Coordinates: 39.3434°N 76.4887°W

The Centre at Golden Ring, formerly the Golden Ring Mall is a power center and former mall in Rosedale, Maryland.

== History ==
=== Golden Ring Mall ===
The mall was first announced by developers Melvin Simon & Associates in April 1972, with Stewart's, Hecht's, and Montgomery Ward as anchors. Stewart's would operate a 3-level, 145,000 sq ft store to include a 15,000 sq ft budget shop, Montgomery Ward's would be 175,000 sq ft with a freestanding auto center, and Hecht's would be 150,000 sq ft, with 370,000 sq ft of space across two floors for smaller shops in the mall itself. Montgomery Ward would open ahead of the mall on September 11, 1974, followed by Hecht's on October 1, 1974, and Stewart's on October 14, 1974. The mall itself would open with a 2-week grand opening extravaganza beginning on October 28, 1974. The mall also featured an installation from American sculptor Rita Blitt.

The first major change came to the mall in November 1982, when all five Stewart's stores would close their doors, with Golden Ring's location one of four taken over by discount operator Caldor. Simon would announce a major, $2 million renovation in 1986, which would add a new center court and second level food court, along with renovations to the entire mall interior. At this time, Herman Renfro, assistant vice president of development for Simon, remarked that the mall was "showing its age", and that "Without a major expansion, there's no way we can offer the selection of merchandise of a White Marsh or an Owings Mills. What we can do is create as pleasant a shopping area as possible".

Caldor would close its location at Golden Ring in 1998, as one of two Baltimore area stores to close in an effort to emerge from bankruptcy. It was noted that Golden Ring was "already struggling with competition from White Marsh Mall and a renovated Eastpoint Mall", and that it was expected to take at least a year to fill the space vacated by Caldor. Further decline is evident in that by 1999, a large portion of the parking lot was used for "Baltimore's Best Darn Yard Sale".

The mall would be put up for sale by Simon in 1998, with Virginia developer Petrie, Dierman, and Kughn submitting plans for a new power center to replace the mall in early 2000. The plan would demolish the entire mall except for Wards, who intended to remain at the new center, and build a discount department store, a warehouse club, and a home-improvement store. By October 2000, the mall was winding down operations, with a majority of tenants either closed, closing, or set to close by the end of the year. It was at this time that Hecht's spokeswoman Diane Daly would confirm that they were looking to sell the store, and would not remain for the new development. Wards would also leave the development later that year, as they announced the closure of all remaining stores in December 2000.

=== The Centre at Golden Ring ===
The property would reopen, as the Centre at Golden Ring, in 2002, with anchors Walmart, Sam's Club, and The Home Depot. The former Wards building was later subdivided for multiple tenants.
