= Eastpoint Mall =

Defunct mall in Dundalk, Maryland, U.S.

Coordinates: 39°17′37″N 76°30′37″W

- Entrance to Eastpoint Mall in July 2026
- Location: Dundalk, Maryland, United States
- Address: 7839 Eastpoint Mall
- Opened: October 1, 1956; 70 years ago (enclosed 1972)
- Closed: August 31, 2026; 2 months ago
- Previous names: Eastpoint Shopping Center (1956–1972)
- Developer: Joseph Meyerhoff
- Manager: MCB Real Estate
- Owner: MCB Real Estate
- Num. of stores: 146
- Num. of anchor tenants: 4 (2 open, 2 vacant)
- Floors: 1 (small 2nd floor and ground floor, 2 In JCPenney)
- Public transit: MTA Maryland bus: 40, 59, 62, 160, CityLink Orange
- Website: www.eastpointmall.com (Website no longer maintained at this time)

Eastpoint Mall, formerly Eastpoint Shopping Center, is a defunct mall located in Baltimore County. Eastpoint Mall was one of Baltimore's first shopping centers and had been serving the community since 1956.

Eastpoint Mall was anchored by JCPenney, Gabe's, and Black Friday Outlet. The mall featured over 120 specialty shops, restaurants, and services including Foot Locker, Bath & Body Works, AT&T Wireless, Shoe City, Chick-fil-A, The Children's Place, McDonald's, Shoe Show, Cricket Wireless, and Rue21.

== History ==
Eastpoint Shopping Center opened on October 1, 1956 as an outdoor mall, with anchor stores Hutzler's and Hochschild Kohn's. In 1972, it was enclosed. JCPenney opened an anchor store in 1974. In 1981, a Record Bar store opened at the mall. The Hutzler's store closed in 1984 and became a food court in 1991, while Sears was also added. Value City and Value City Furniture later split the old Hochschild Kohn's building. Ames was also added as an anchor, later becoming Steve & Barry's. Steve & Barry's closed in 2008, becoming DSW and Shoppers World in 2010. DSW since closed in early 2016. The mall's fountain was based on Robert Woodward's El Alamein Fountain in Sydney. On November 2, 2017, it was announced that Sears would be closing as part of a plan to close 63 stores nationwide. The store closed in January 2018.

A clearance center that sells home decor and furniture called Diamond Point Home Furnishing later opened in the former Sears.

Value City Furniture eventually was replaced by Black Friday Outlet, a discount store that sells a wide variety of items. Black Friday Outlet currently operates utilizing the entirety of the former Value City Furniture building.

It was abruptly announced on June 18, 2026 that the mall would be closing on August 31, 2026. As of September 1, 2026, the interior portion of the mall was closed and only select stores with outside entrances remain open at this time.

== Gallery ==
Interior view

Food Court

JCPenney

Black Friday Outlet

Gabe's

Former Sears
