= MedStar Franklin Square Medical Center =

Coordinates: 39°21′5″N 76°28′48″W

- MedStar Health

Geography
- Location: Rosedale, Baltimore County, Maryland, United States

Organization
- Care system: Not-for-profit
- Type: District General, Teaching

Services
- Emergency department: 114,684 (2012)
- Beds: 348

Helipads
- Helipad: (ICAO: 5MD6)

History
- Founded: 1898

Links
- Website: http://MedStarFranklin.org/
- Lists: Hospitals in Maryland

MedStar Franklin Square Medical Center, a member of MedStar Health, is a hospital located in the Rosedale area of eastern Baltimore County, Maryland. It is the third largest hospital in Maryland; with more than 3,500 employees, it is one of the largest employers in Baltimore County.

The building is found along Franklin Square Drive, next to the campus of Community College of Baltimore County - Essex, and is used for the clinical training of allied health programs at the college.

== History ==
In 1898 Franklin Square opened with 20 beds, the first hospital to open in the community of West Baltimore. In 1969 the hospital moved to the eastern Baltimore County in a new 325-bed facility.

The Emergency Department treats a daily average of 300 patients making it one of the busiest emergency rooms in the state of Maryland.

In the fall of 2004, the hospital opened the Harry and Jeanette Weinberg Cancer Institute, which houses centers focusing on melanoma, gynecologic oncology and breast cancer. MedStar Franklin Square built a 356,000-square-foot (33,100 m^{2}) patient tower. Construction began in the fall of 2007, and was completed in 2010.

MedStar Franklin Square has been awarded the high-level designation of a Teaching Hospital Cancer Center by the American College of Surgeons, and was accredited as a Magnet hospital for nursing in 2008, with reaccreditation in 2013. It has been the recipient of the Delmarva Foundation’s highest honor, the Excellence Award for Quality for Hospitals, in 2009, 2011 and 2012. U.S. News & World Report ranked the hospital as third best in Maryland and the Baltimore metropolitan area; it was also ranked among the nation’s top 50 “Best Hospitals” in Gastroenterology and Digestive system (GI) surgery. This is the fourth consecutive year the hospital has been included in this ranking.
