= West Baltimore Innovation District =

Coordinates: 39°18′51″N 76°38′21″W

- Innovation district
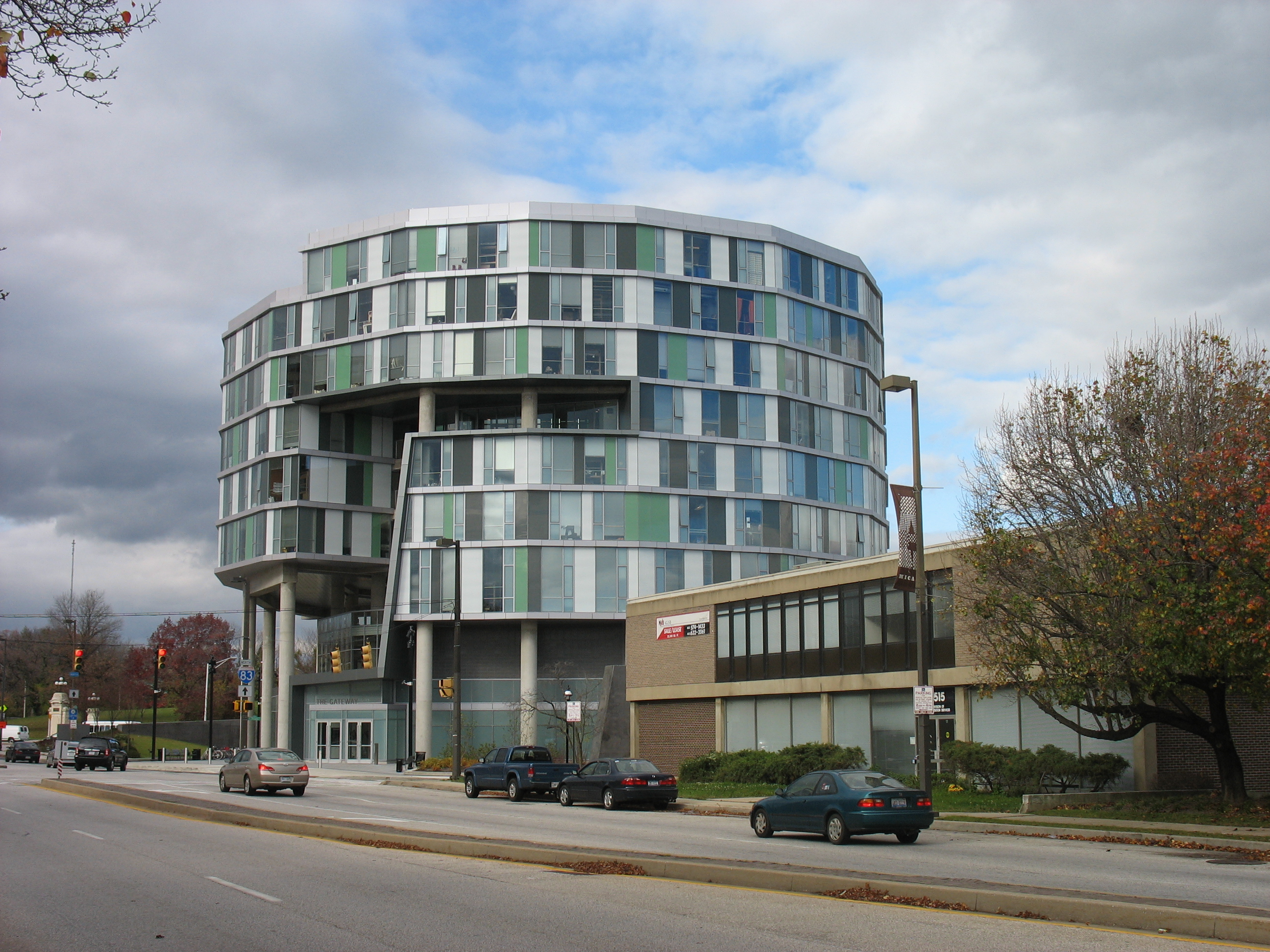
- MICA Gateway Building

- Location within Baltimore
- Country: United States
- State: Maryland
- City: Baltimore
- Launched: January 18, 2016

Area
  - Total: 6.8 sq mi (18 km^{2})
- Time zone: UTC-5 (Eastern)
  - Summer (DST): EDT
- ZIP code: 21217
- Area code: 410, 443, and 667

The West Baltimore Innovation Village District is a neighborhood district of Baltimore City that will specialize in attracting startup companies and other employers to West Baltimore. Following the Death of Freddie Gray and the subsequent 2015 Baltimore protests, government leaders decided to launch the innovation district as a way to attract redevelopment and revitalization to the areas hardest hit by the protests. The district includes the neighborhoods of Mondawmin, Coppin Heights, Penn-North, Reservoir Hill and Bolton Hill.

== Background ==
Efforts to form the district originated from the community organization known as the Mount Royal Community Development Corporation (MRCDC). Similar innovation districts have been formed in neighborhoods like University City in Philadelphia and the South Boston Seaport District. The West Baltimore Innovation District neighbors the nearby Station North Arts and Entertainment District and includes access to numerous forms of transportation including the Baltimore Metro Subway and Baltimore Light Rail.

== Neighborhood attractions ==
- Coppin State University
- Druid Hill Park
- Howard Peters Rawlings Conservatory and Botanic Gardens of Baltimore
- The Maryland Zoo in Baltimore
- Mondawmin Mall
- Maryland Institute College of Art

== Transportation ==
- Mondawmin Metro Station
- Penn–North Metro Station
- Upton / Avenue Market Metro Station
- State Center Metro Station
- Cultural Center Light Rail stop
- Mt. Royal/MICA station
- North Avenue Light Rail stop
