= Mondawmin =

Mondawmin refers to the following in Baltimore, Maryland, in the United States:

- Mondawmin, Baltimore, a neighborhood in Northwest Baltimore
  - Mondawmin Mall, a three-story mall located in the Mondawmin neighborhood
    - Mondawmin station, a Baltimore Metro subway station located at Mondawmin Mall
- Mondawmin Shuttle Bug, also known as MTA bus route 82, a transit route operated in Baltimore
