= Mondawmin station =

Metro SubwayLink station

Mondawmin
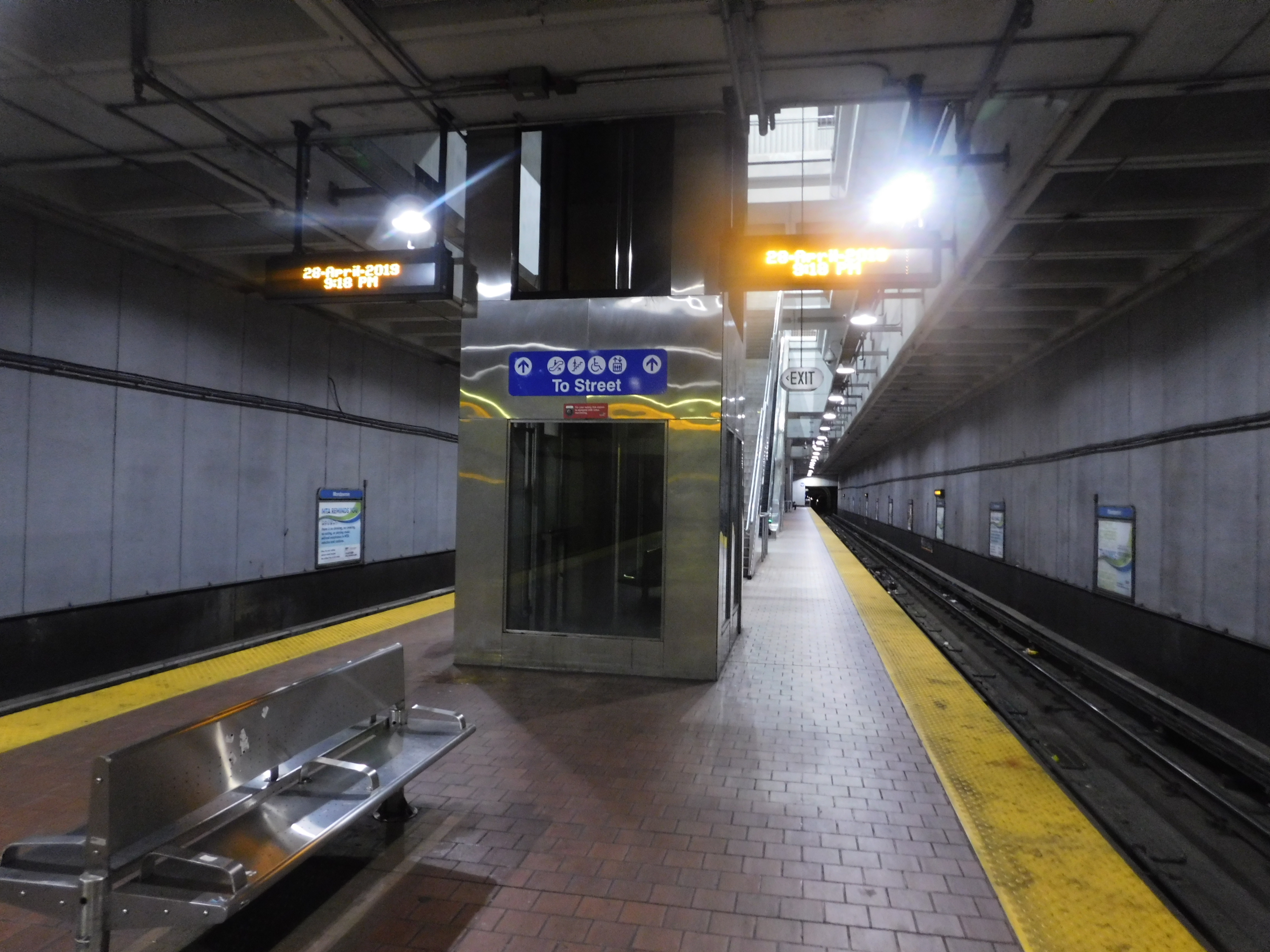
- Mondawmin station in April 2019.

General information
- Location: 2307 Liberty Heights Avenue; Baltimore, Maryland 21215
- Coordinates: 39.318170°N 76.652695°W
- Owner: Maryland Transit Administration
- Platforms: 1 island platform
- Tracks: 2

Construction
- Parking: 175 spaces
- Accessible: Yes

History
- Opened: November 21, 1983

Passengers
- 2017: 3,902 daily

Services
Preceding station	Maryland Transit Administration	Following station
West Cold Spring toward Owings Mills	Metro SubwayLink	Penn–North toward Johns Hopkins Hospital
Location

Mondawmin station is a Metro SubwayLink station in Baltimore, Maryland. It is located under the intersection of Reisterstown Road and Liberty Heights Avenue in the Mondawmin neighborhood, adjacent to the Mondawmin Mall. It is the northernmost underground station on the line, and a major transfer point to many bus routes.

Mondawmin station serves Mondawmin Mall, Coppin State University, Druid Hill Park, The Maryland Zoo in Baltimore, and the Lower Park Heights neighborhood.

On the surface, a bus loop connects to Reisterstown Road and Liberty Heights Avenue. This loop and the adjacent streets are used by a number of bus routes, many of which terminate in it.

Several routes were cut back to Mondawmin on June 18, 1984, about seven months after the station opened, and Routes M-1, M-2, and M-3 were formed at that time to replace the portions of those routes beyond Mondawmin. Specifically, Route M-1 was split from Route 28 (now Route 5 near Mondawmin), Route M-2 was split from Route 7, and Route M-3 was split from Route 5.

== Station features ==
In July 2021, the MTA announced the installation of digital bus arrival signage at the Mondawmin station bus loop as part of a pilot program which also includes Rogers Avenue station and the Patapsco light rail station. A 2010 renovation to the station area which included the repavement of the bus loop had been accompanied by an announcement about the installation of digital signage, but the implementation of real time bus tracking for local MTA buses did not until later. The current iteration of real time bus tracking used to update the digital signage was launched by the MTA in partnership with the Transit app in 2018.

In the summer of 2021, the MTA confirmed a contract for the replacement and removal of two elevators at Mondawmin station, which provide access to the mezzanine level from the street level and connect the platform to the mezzanine level respectively. The extensive overhaul of the elevators and elevator enclosures at the station follows a determination that currently installed equipment has outlived its useful life, and is expected to take 20 months, from January 2022 to August 2023.

== Artwork ==
A back-lit photographic montage entitled "Archetype" by Baltimore artist R. Thomas Gregory is installed along the end wall of the station's upper level. The artwork was commissioned by the MTA for $85,000 in 1983.

== History ==
=== Excavation and construction ===
Mondawmin station was constructed in residual soils and rock using the cut-and-cover technique. The excavation was conducted differently from the other underground stations in the Baltimore Metro system; while other station excavations were supported by soldier piles extending below their depth, the Mondawmin excavation was supported by a composite system consisting of soldier piles through the upper decomposed formations, and rock bolts, wire mesh, and shotcrete through the lower more rigid materials. This method decreased the time and cost of construction, and provided more open working space for the contractor. Extensive instrumentation was used to identify where additional support was required as the excavation proceeded. The excavation was 183 meters long, 16 meters wide, and reached depths to bottom between 27 and 29 meters.

The excavation was informed by an investigation of the weathering profile of the underlying material in which 24 vertical and inclined borings were conducted. A series of residual materials were characterized and classified in the upper portions of the profile, underlain by more competent material and the parent amphibolite and intrusive gneiss bedrock. Shear zones frequently identified with the contacts between the amphibolite and the gneiss were identified as important for the design of the support system for the excavation.

Two sets of tunnels were constructed underground at a site which could be entered through a portal near the intersection of Druid Park Drive and Liberty Heights Avenue, and which extended across an area beneath the 2600 block of Liberty Heights Avenue. Construction of the tunnels was overseen by Cleveland-based contractor Clevecon-au-Vianini for a cost of $40.7 million. The Mondawmin tunnels are unique among those that make up the Baltimore Metro subway line in that they were driven through competent rock rather than weathered or residual material.

=== Mondawmin Shuttle ===
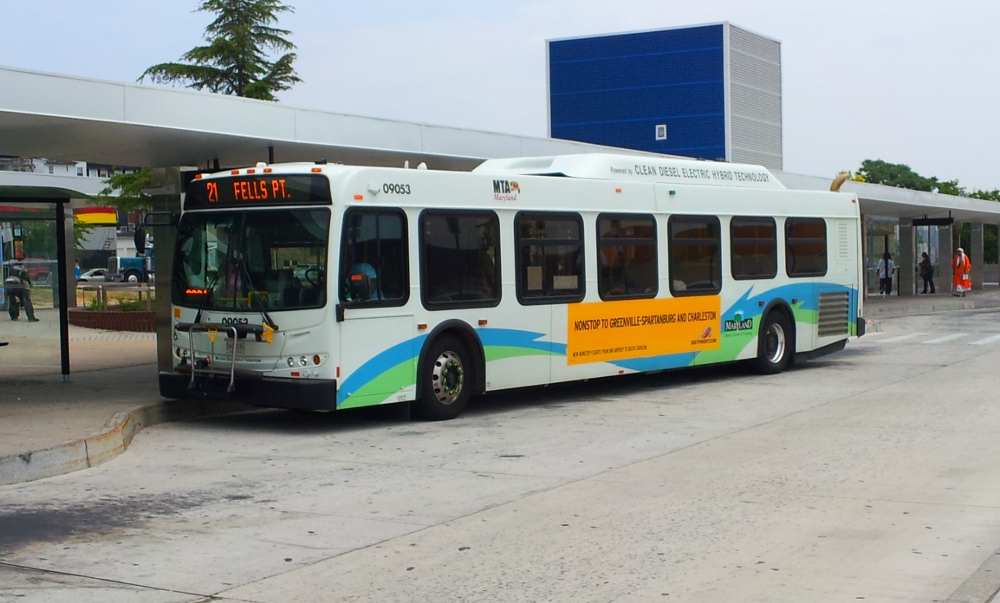
MTA Line 21 Bus outside of Mondawmin station

MTA Route 97, also known as the Mondawmin Shuttle Bug or Mondawmin Shuttle, was the second and is so far the final in the series of shuttle bugs to be introduced in the 2000s. The route serves Baltimore City Community College, Coppin State College, and various nearby streets, some served by regular bus routes, and some not. But the full route is within a close walk of one or more other MTA bus routes. The route operates at 20-minute intervals.

In 2005, as part of the Greater Baltimore Bus Initiative, it was initially proposed that the shuttle's frequency would be reduced to one bus an hour, and riders were encouraged to use other regular bus routes that shared common routing. However, after community meetings, it was ultimately decided that the schedule would remain the same.

In 2006, MTA proposed that the route would be modified to serve Reservoir Hill in order to replace a portion of Route 5 that was at the time proposed for modification away from this area. But it was later decided that Route 5 would continue to serve Reservoir Hill.

=== April 27, 2015 protests and shutdown ===
On Monday, April 27, 2015, riots broke out around Mondawmin station in a clash between police officers and demonstrators protesting the death of Freddie Gray. Details of the origins of the clashes and response from local officials have remained unclear since they occurred. In the early afternoon, law enforcement officials arrived at the transit hub in riot gear, allegedly in response to memes about a "purge" around school dismissal time which were being circulated on social media. At 2:45 P.M., police officers, MTA officials, and school officials were gathered at Mondawmin station for a roll call, and minute later at 2:46 P.M., the MTA issued a dispatch about a rock being thrown. Baltimore police officers formed a skirmish line across the bus loop, blocking access to buses, within the next 10 minutes. Many students at the nearby Frederick Douglas High School were left stranded as they left the school. A growing number people had been arriving on the scene prior to the shut down of Mondawmin station. At first, MTA officials tried to get some students and other patrons onto departing trains while blocking passengers from alighting at Mondawmin, and some buses were still stopping in the area. At 3:21 P.M., Baltimore police closed the intersection of Reisterstown Road and Liberty Heights Avenue, forcing the diversion of all bus traffic from the area.

The MTA subsequently announced that the Metro subway was operating on Tuesday, April 28, but that Mondawmin, Upton, and Penn-North stations would be temporarily closed, and that bus diversions around the Mondawmin bus loop were in place. On Wednesday, April 29, the MTA announced the continuation of the temporary station closures and bus diversions. On Thursday, April 30, the MTA reopened the stations to resume regularly scheduled service.

Notably, it remains unclear who ordered the shutdown of transit at Mondawmin on April 27, 2015. Mayor Stephanie Rawlings-Blake stated that she was not sure where the order came from, and that MTA officials attributed it to school officials, while school officials attributed it to the police. A spokesman for the MTA said that the police requested the shut down, and city police referred questions about the shutdown to the MTA. Baltimore City Public Schools CEO Gregory Thornton said that he was amid key meetings with the mayor and the governor and was "completely caught off guard" by the decision to shut down transit.

== Transit-oriented development ==
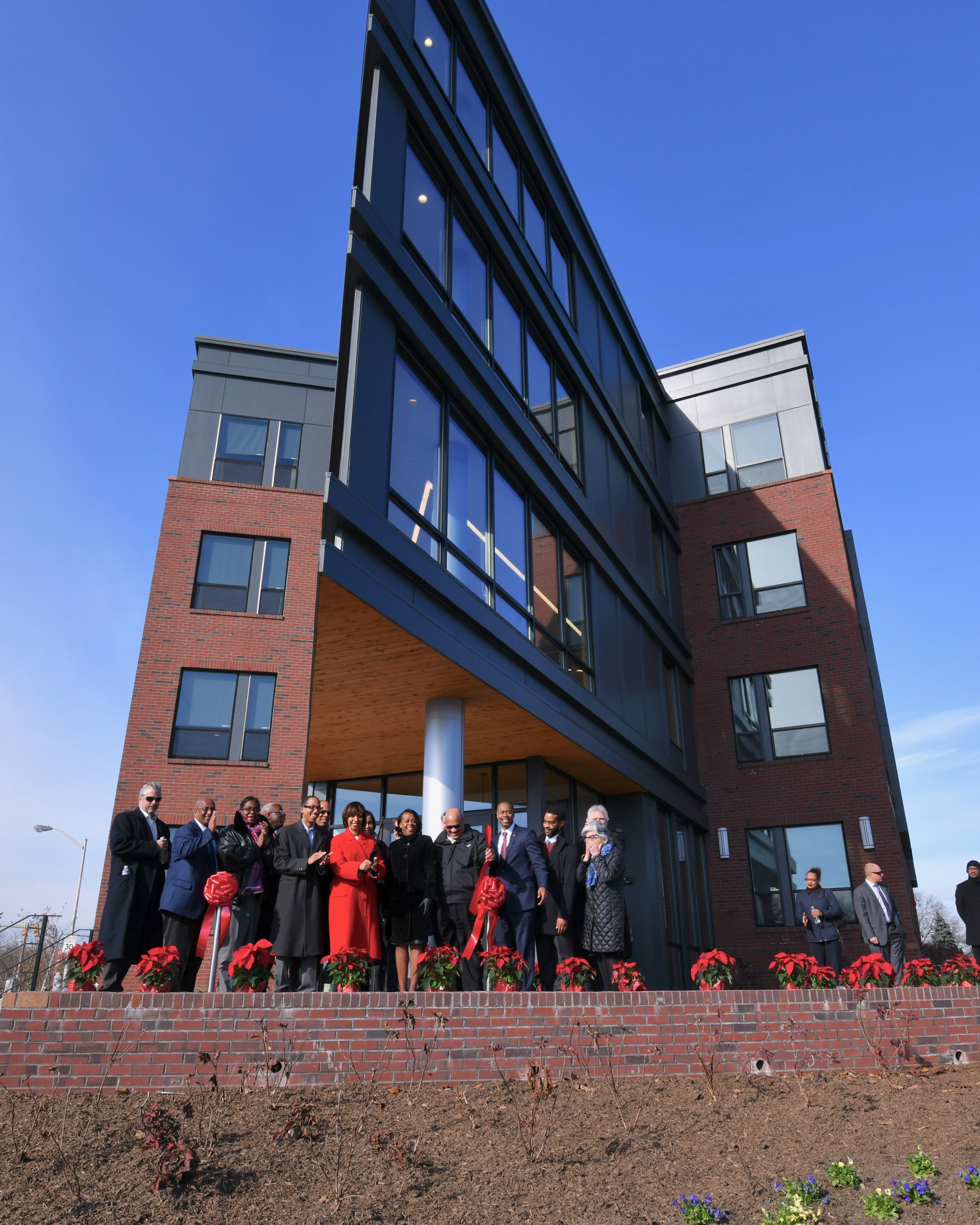
Local politicians including Mayor Catherine Pugh gather for an opening ceremony for Metro Heights at Mondawmin in November 2018.

In November 2018, a mixed-income affordable housing community named Metro Heights opened at the intersection of Liberty Heights Avenue and Reisterstown Road near the Mondawmin Metro station due to the site's advantageous location within Baltimore City's regional transportation network. The 15.9 million dollar four-story development of 70 units replaced a block of vacant row homes and was financed by a combination of state, city, and private investment organizations.
