= Broadway Market (Baltimore) =

Market in Baltimore, Maryland

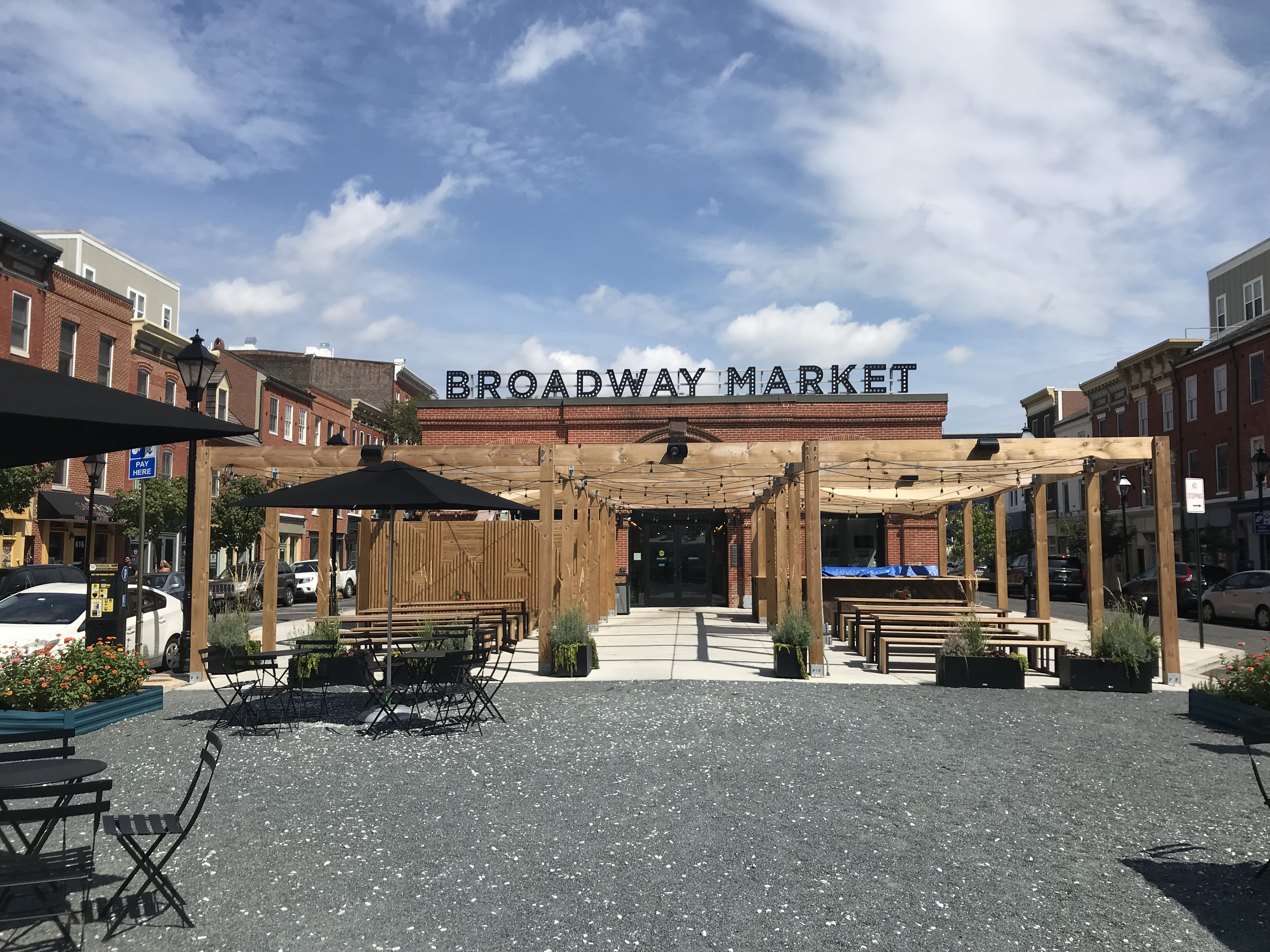
- South entrance to North Pavilion, Broadway Market

- Location within Baltimore Location within Maryland Location within the United States

General information
- Status: In operation
- Type: Market (1786–2019, 1786–2011 for North Pavilion); Festival marketplace (2019–present)
- Location: 1640–1641 Aliceanna Street, Baltimore, Maryland, United States
- Coordinates: 39.2842°N 76.5934°W
- Opened: 1786 (as a market); 2019 (as a festival marketplace)
- Renovated: 2019
- Closed: 2011 (North Pavilion only; reopened 2019)
- Owner: Baltimore Public Markets Corporation
- Operator: Baltimore Public Markets Corporation

Technical details
- Floor count: 1 in both pavilions (formerly 2)

Website
- broadwaymarketbaltimore.com

Broadway Market was established in 1786 in Fells Point, Baltimore, Maryland, United States, and was most recently renovated in 2019 after being shuttered for nearly a decade. The market currently consists of two shed-like pavilions: the North Pavilion (also referred to as the North Shed or the North Market) and the South Pavilion (also referred to as the South Shed or the South Market). The North Pavilion houses local food vendors and a plant store, while the South Pavilion houses The Choptank, a seafood restaurant operated by Atlas Restaurant Group.

The market is owned and managed by the Baltimore Public Markets Corporation, a non-profit operating on behalf of the City of Baltimore.

== History ==
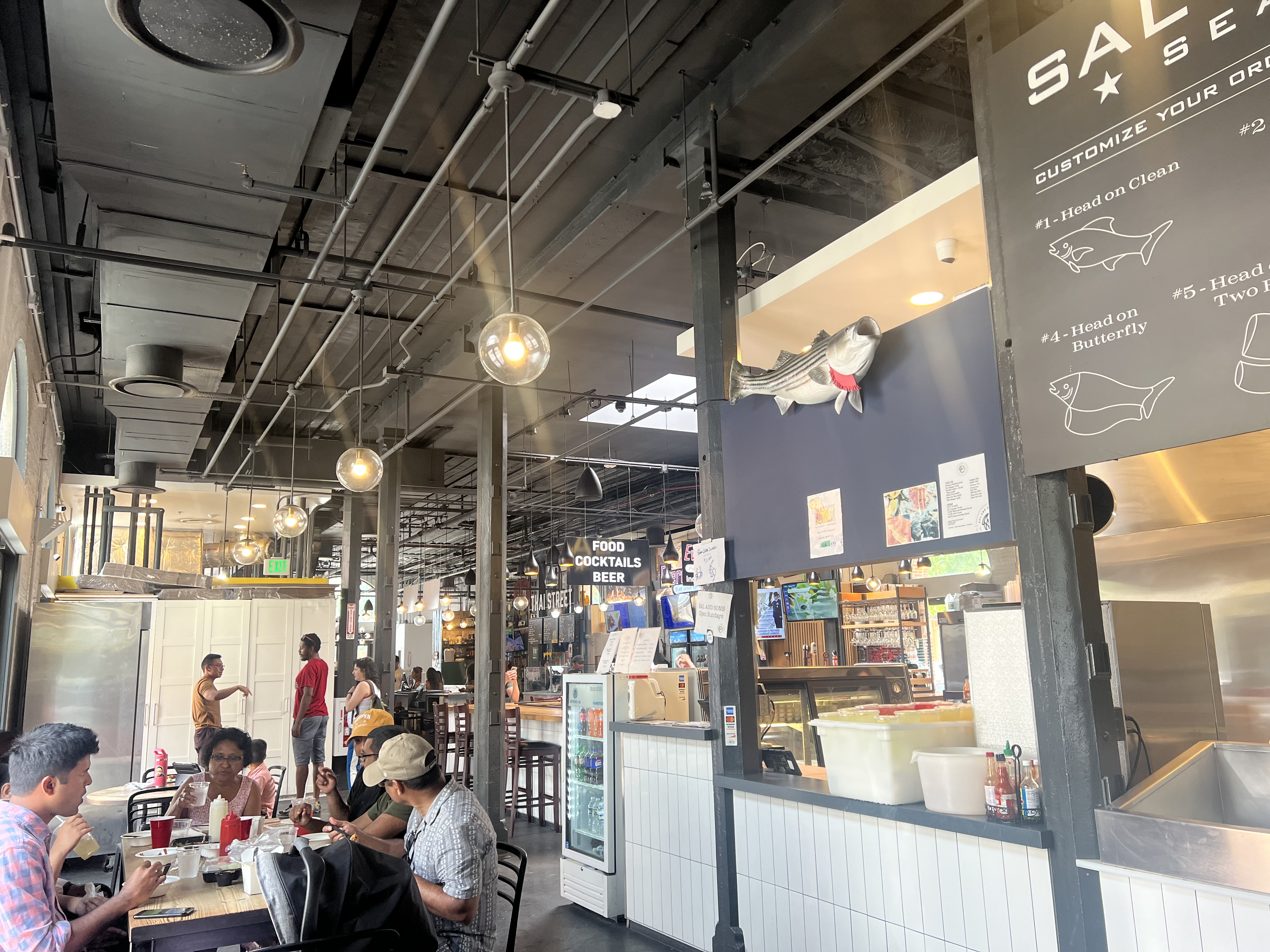
Interior of the Broadway Market

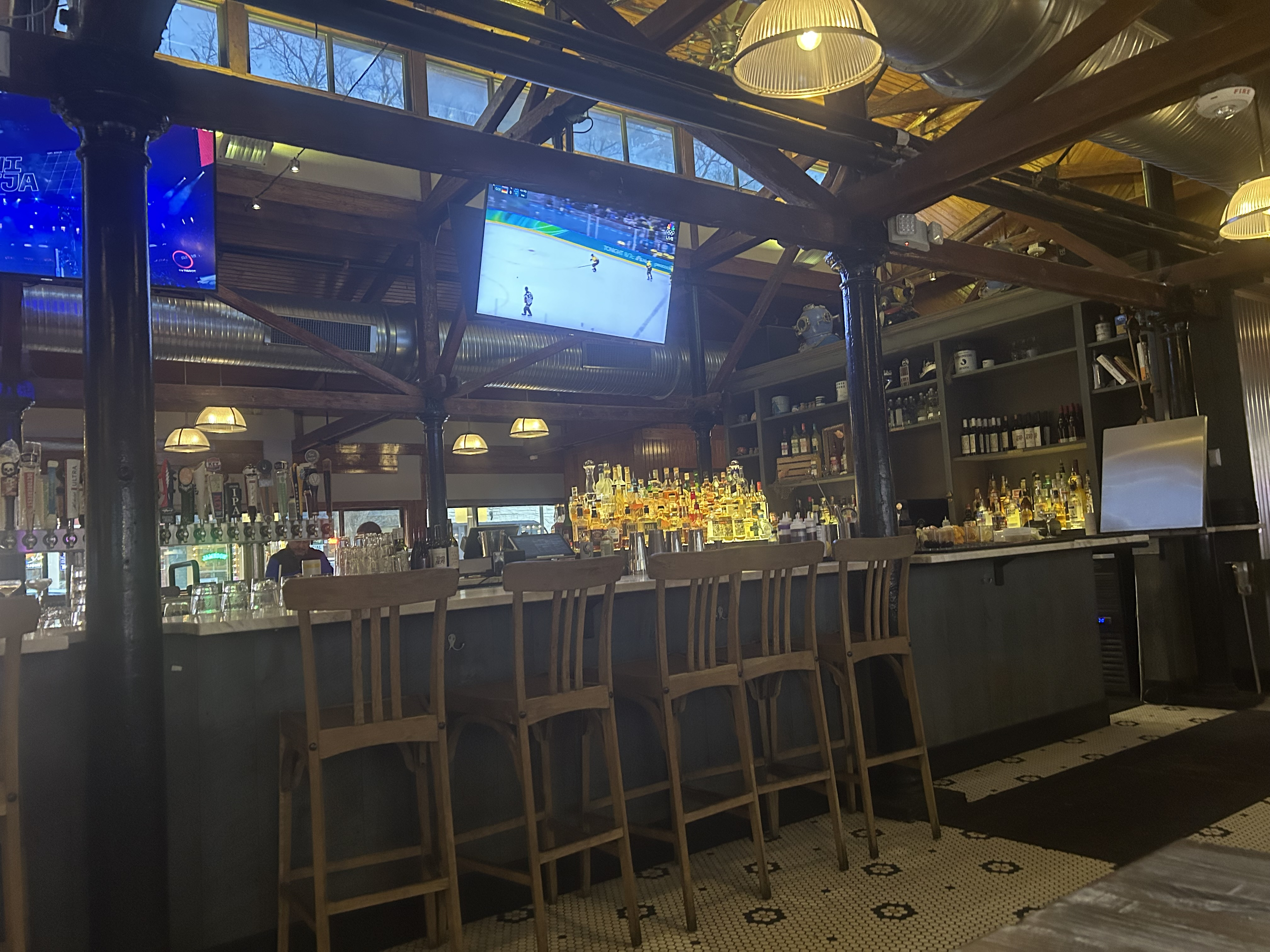
The interior of The Choptank at Broadway Market on February 15, 2026.

=== Pre-construction and development ===
Broadway Market was established in 1786 in the historic Fells Point district. It was started by a group of Polish immigrants at 999 Broadway in 1888.

=== After opening ===
The market was expanded to cover an entire block, bordered by Lombard, Gibson, and Broadway Streets. The area also became Buffalo's second largest business section. It involved exotic delicacies from Africa, black olives from Spain, cheese from Italy, smoked salmon, and more.

The first Market building was burned down and was replaced with a high-ceiling building. A third structure was built in 1956, which included 90,000 square feet of retail and two floors of free parking for 1,000 cars.

=== Decline and closure ===
Post-1950 suburbanization and the rise of shopping malls in Baltimore, such as the newly opened Mondawmin Center (now Mondawmin Mall) in West Baltimore, led to a significant loss of middle-income households in Baltimore, reducing the customer base for traditional city markets.

==== Neglect and disinvestment ====
By the late 20th century, the market has fell into disrepair, such as persistent pest control issues and years of disinvestment, leading to the market to face temporary closures at times. In the summer of 2018, the North Pavilion was caught with rats inside it, which the Lexington Market had similar problems with. Some sections of the pavilions were also under-maintained for years.

Decline exacerbated from a 1960s fire which destroyed the North Pavilion's "civic hall" second floor. The second floor was demolished shortly thereafter, and was never replaced. Decline also exacerbated in the 70s and 80s due to the rise of more suburban malls within Maryland, such as Marley Station Mall, Owings Mills Mall, The Mall in Columbia and the 80s renovation of Mondawmin Mall.

The market was also unable to compete with the Harborplace Festival Marketplace in the Inner Harbor which opened in the summer of 1980, along with its adjacent Gallery at Harborplace mall which opened in September 1987. The opening of Arundel Mills in November 2000 further exacerbated this.

As a result of failure to keep the market up-to-date and attract enough visitors, the North Pavilion closed its doors in 2011 and remained vacant for almost a decade. Multiple vendors relocated to the South Pavilion.

=== Redevelopment ===
In 2018, it was announced that Broadway Market would undergo a $3.2 million renovation to revitalize the area and bring Baltimoreans back to Fells Point. The complex was converted into a festival marketplace, the same concept that made the now-defunct Harborplace successful in the 1980s.

The North Pavilion was converted into a diverse food hall, including roughly ten local vendors such as Connie's Chicken and Waffles, Taharka Brothers Ice Cream, and Thai Street. It introduced communal indoor seating, a central bar (Fat Tiger) and a new outdoor patio area that replaced previous parking spaces.

The South Pavilion's interior was demolished and was converted into a restaurant called The Choptank. The conversion was completed by Atlas Restaurant Group, the company that owns the Choptank restaurant, for $4 million.

The redeveloped Broadway Market's first few tenants opened in March 2019. The marketplace itself officially re-opened in May 2019.

Soul Smoked BBQ, Fleurs d'Ave, and MikksKakes opened at Broadway Market in April 2025.

== See also ==
- Baltimore Public Markets
- Festival marketplace
