= Baltimore Public Markets =

Oldest continuously operating public market system in the US

The city of Baltimore, Maryland, has six public markets, which comprise the oldest continuously operating public market system in the United States. Since 1995, they have been administered by the Baltimore Public Market Corporation, a non-profit organization.

== History ==
Baltimore's first public market house was established in 1751, some two decades after the formal incorporation of the town. Twelve years later, the first market was constructed. At one point, 11 markets operated across the city. Oversight of the markets was assigned to the Baltimore Comptroller's Office in 1857, then transferred to the Mayor's Office in 1983.

== Markets ==
Name	Built	Address	Coordinates	Notes
Avenue Market	1871	1700 Pennsylvania Avenue, Baltimore, Maryland 21217	39.3037°N 76.6357°W	Serves the Upton neighborhood. Originally named Lafayette Market until it was changed in 1996, following an extensive renovation.
Broadway Market	1786	1640–41 Aliceanna Street, Baltimore, Maryland 21231	39.2842°N 76.5934°W	One of the first three markets to serve the city. Originally named Fells Point Market but was then relocated to the center of Broadway.
Cross Street Market	1846	1065 S. Charles Street, Baltimore, Maryland 21230	39.2768°N 76.6133°W	Serves the Federal Hill-SoBo neighborhoods of Baltimore. In 2015, it was announced that the market would be renovated. Work began in 2018, with a reopening in phases beginning in May, 2019.
Hollins Market	1838	26 S. Arlington Avenue, Baltimore, Maryland 21223	39.2875°N 76.6360°W	Named after the Hollins family of Union Square, who owned the land surrounding the market.
Lexington Market	1782	400 W. Lexington Street, Baltimore, MD 21201	39.2915°N 76.6218°W	Built on land provided by John Eager Howard, this is one of the longest-running public markets in the world. The market also features notable Baltimore foods, such as Berger Cookies and Faidley's Seafood.
Northeast Market	1885	2101 E. Monument Street, Baltimore, Maryland 21205	39.2981°N 76.5876°W	Was constructed nearly 100 years after Broadway Market, during the time of the construction of Johns Hopkins Hospital.

== Defunct markets ==
Name	Built	Closed	Address	Coordinates	Notes
Centre Market; Fish Market	1787		35 Market Place, Baltimore, MD 21202	39.2890°N 76.6063°W	Originally the market for Baltimore's seafood industry, the structure was renovated and repurposed as Port Discovery Children's Museum in 1998.
Belair Market	1871		Forrest and Orleans Streets, Baltimore, MD 21202	39.2952°N 76.6044°W	The site of the market is now part of the Old Town Mall development in East Baltimore.
North Avenue Market	1928		14-34 West North Avenue, Baltimore, MD 21201	39.3114°N 76.6174°W	The private market included 12 stores and a bowling alley. Since its closing in the 1960s, the structure has been converted for retail and entertainment for Station North Arts and Entertainment District.
Richmond Market	1853		301 West Read Street, Baltimore, MD 21201	39.3007°N 76.6205°W	The original structure is now part of the University of Maryland Medical Center Midtown Campus.
Waverly Market	1920		33rd Street and Greenmount Avenue, Baltimore, MD 21218	39.3281°N 76.6098°W	Another private market, Waverly Market included a variety of shopping options for North Baltimore residents.
