= Elizabeth Habte Wold =

Ethiopian artist (born 1963)

- Born: 1963 (age 61–62)
- Education: School of Fine Arts and Design, Addis Ababa University; Baltimore City Community College; Howard University (MFA); George Washington University (certificate in interactive multimedia and web design)
- Known for: Mixed-media collages exploring displacement and diaspora
- Notable work: Works in Ethiopian Passages: Dialogues in the Diaspora (2003, National Museum of African Art, Smithsonian)
- Style: Mixed-media; Collage; Digital media Computer animation
- Movement: Contemporary Ethiopian diaspora art

Elizabeth Habte Wold (born 1963) is an Ethiopian artist known for her mixed-media work. Her works in a 2003 exhibition were described thus: "Wold's small collages, made from torn newspapers and magazines, ponder the fragmented lives of displaced people, both [in the U.S.] and in Ethiopia." These works were included in a group exhibition called "Ethiopian Passages: Dialogues in the Diaspora" at the Smithsonian's National Museum of African Art. Her work has also been exhibited at the National Museum of Ethiopia and Gebre Kristos Desta Center.

Wold's recent works sometimes include computer animation.

== Education ==
She completed degrees in fine arts at the School of Fine Arts in Addis Ababa and Baltimore City Community College in Maryland, and an MFA at Howard University. She became interested in digital media through a certificate program in interactive multimedia and web design at George Washington University. She has worked since the mid-1990s as a multimedia designer, and lives in Addis Ababa.

== Exhibitions ==
- 2024 Inspired Women 5, Laphto Contemporary Art Gallery, Addis Ababa, Ethiopia
- 2022 Voices of Women, Hyatt Regency, Addis Ababa, Ethiopia
- 2017 Erasen Be Ras, Modern Art Museum, Gebre Kirsto Desta Center, Addis Ababa, Ethiopia
- 2016 A Day Without Migrants, National Museum of Ethiopia, Addis Ababa, Ethiopia
- 2013 Africa Rising, African Union, Addis Ababa, Ethiopia
- 2013 Solo Show, Tempo, Asni Gallery, Addis Ababa, Ethiopia
- 2012 Inspired Women, Laphto Gallery, Addis Ababa, Ethiopia
- 2011 Solo Show, Asni Gallery, Addis Ababa, Ethiopia
- 2010 Nexus, Laphto Center, Addis Ababa, Ethiopia
- 2007 Solo Show, Listening Through the Eyes, Asni Gallery, Addis Ababa, Ethiopia
- 2007 Continuity & Change: Three Generations of Ethiopian Artists Samuel P. Harn Museum of Art, University of Florida, Florida
- 2006 Living Embodiments: Artistic Expressions of Being, Parish Gallery, Georgetown, Washington, DC
- 2004 Solo Show, Parish Gallery, Georgetown, Washington, DC
