= Penn-North, Baltimore =

Neighborhood in Baltimore, Maryland, US

Penn-North
- Neighborhood of Baltimore
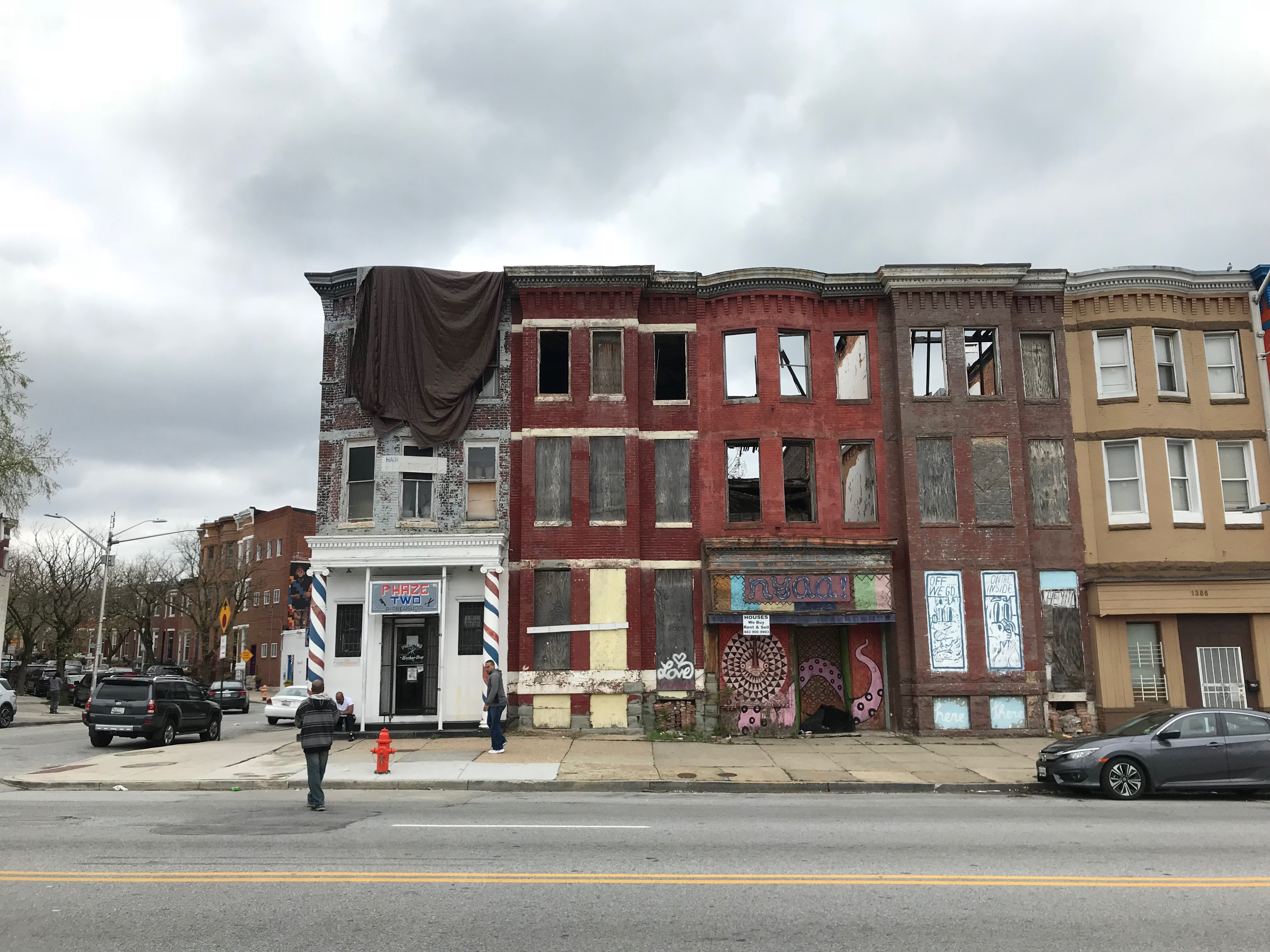
- Buildings on the 1300 block of West North Avenue by the intersection with Woodbrook Avenue in Penn-North, Baltimore
- Interactive map of Penn-North
- Location within Baltimore Location within Maryland Location within the United States
- Coordinates: 39°18′34″N 76°38′38″W
- Country: United States
- State: Maryland
- City: Baltimore
- City Council: District 7
- Time zone: UTC−5 (Eastern)
  - Summer (DST): UTC−4 (EDT)
- ZIP Codes: 21217
- Area Codes: 410, 443, 667

Penn-North is a neighborhood in the city of Baltimore, Maryland, United States. It is located southwest of Druid Hill Park, west of Reservoir Hill, north of Bolton Hill, and east of Mondawmin. It is bounded Northeast by the Druid Park Lake Drive, the West and Northwest by Fulton Ave., the South by North Avenue (U.S. Route 1), and East by McCulloh Street. It is contained in the 21217 ZIP code.

The neighborhood has a subway stop located at the corner of Pennsylvania Ave. and North Ave. This is the Penn-North Metro Subway Station.

Some of the earliest records of the development of the area is the historical maps. One of these shows North Ave.'s intersection with Pennsylvania Ave. and the streets around it.

Proposed City Plans are available online.
