= LocalLink 82 (BaltimoreLink) =

Bus route operated by the Maryland Transit Administration

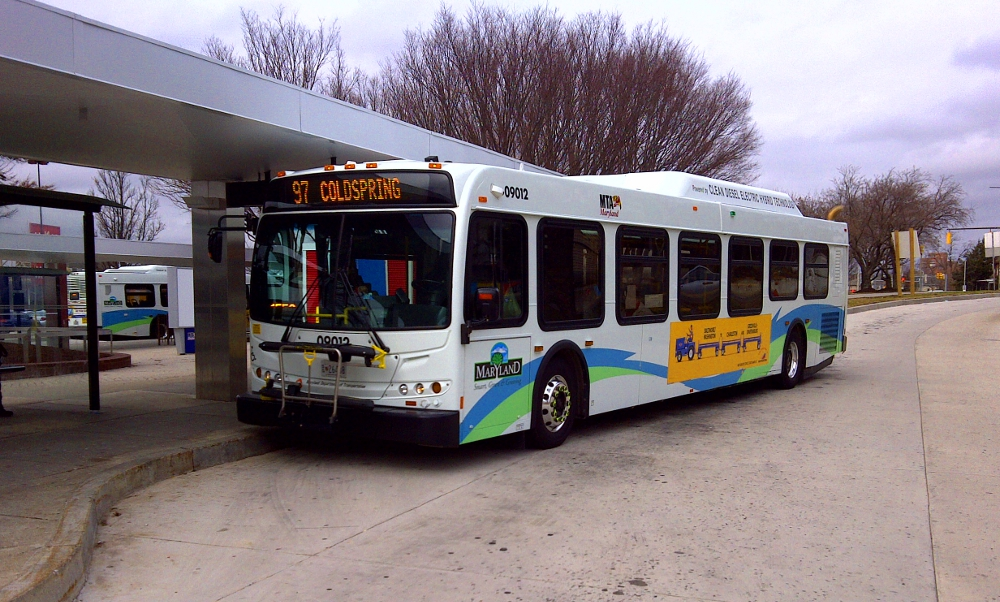

Overview
- System: Maryland Transit Administration
- Garage: Northwest
- Status: active
- Began service: 2002

Route
- Locale: Baltimore City
- Communities served: Arlington; Park Heights
- Landmarks served: Baltimore City Community College; Coppin State College; Druid Hill Park

Service
- Level: Daily
- Frequency: Every 30 minutes Every 30 minutes (peak)
- Weekend frequency: Every 30 minutes
- Operates: 5:30 am to 10:00 pm

LocalLink 82, formerly Route 97 is a bus route operated by the Maryland Transit Administration in Baltimore. The bus route was formerly operated as a shuttle service, known as the Mondawmin Shuttle Bug or Mondawmin Shuttle, as one of two neighborhood shuttle routes operated by the Maryland Transit Administration in Baltimore. It was the second and is so far the final in the series of shuttle bus routes to be introduced by MTA in the 2000s. The route serves Baltimore City Community College, Coppin State University, and various nearby streets.

The route formerly had the "shuttle" status, operating via a circuitous route, and allowing boarding for a reduced $1.00 fare.

== History ==
LocalLink 82 began service under Route 97 in 2002.

In 2005, as part of the Greater Baltimore Bus Initiative, it was initially proposed that the shuttle's frequency would be reduced to one bus an hour, and riders were encouraged to use other regular bus routes that shared common routing. However, after community meetings, it was ultimately decided that the schedule would remain the same.

In 2006, MTA proposed that the route would be modified to serve Reservoir Hill in order to replace a portion of Route 5 that was at the time proposed for modification away from this area. But it was later decided that Route 5 would continue to serve Reservoir Hill.

In 2017, as a part of the BaltimoreLink system redesign, the Route 97 shuttle was reconfigured as a standard two-way route and renamed LocalLink 82. As a part of the reconfiguration, the route's special shuttle designation and lower fare were removed.
