= Northeast Market =

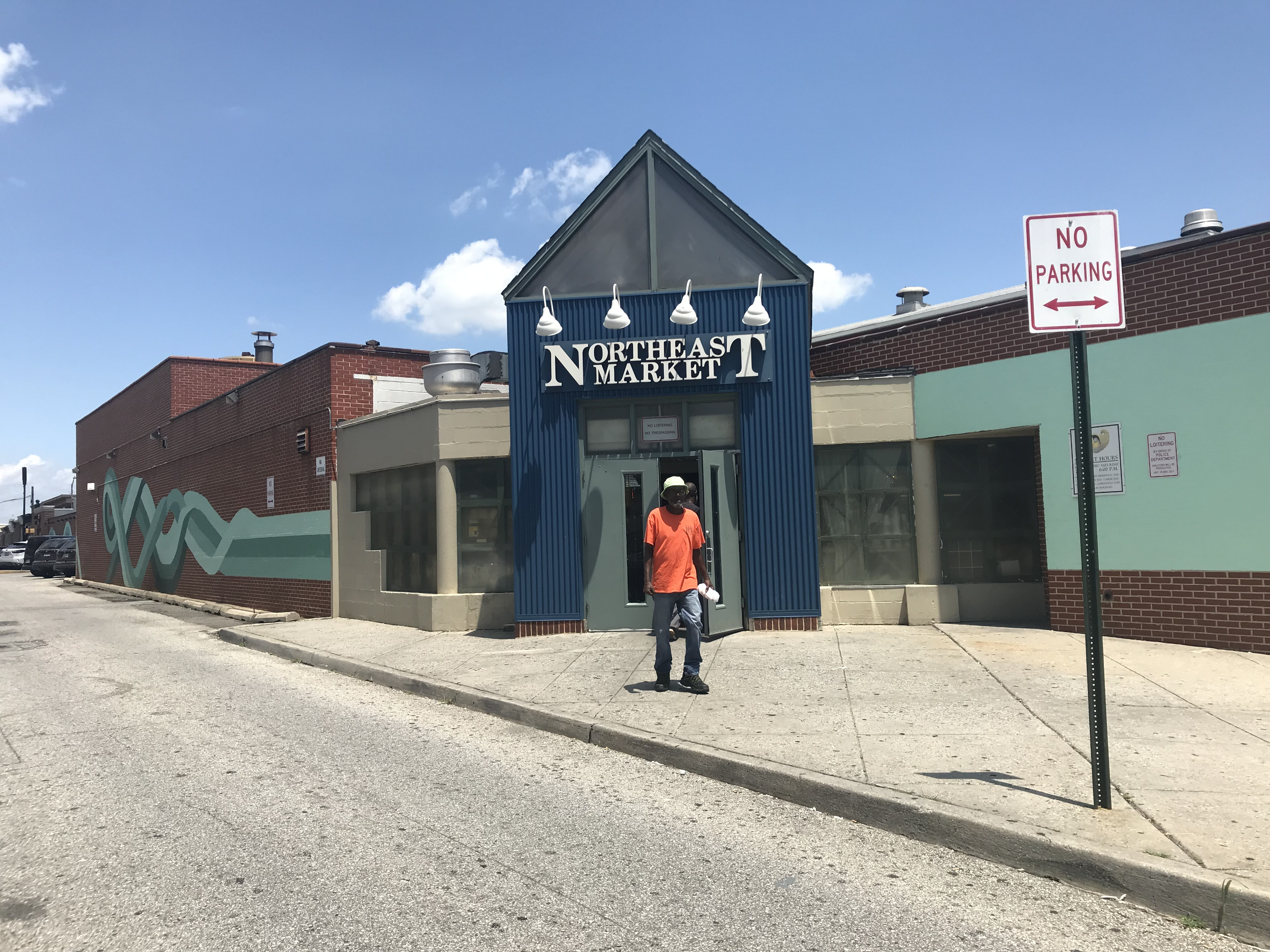
- Chester Street entrance to Northeast Market

- Location within Baltimore Location within Maryland Location within the United States

General information
- Location: 2101 E Monument Street, Baltimore, Maryland, United States
- Coordinates: 39.2981°N 76.5876°W
- Opened: 1885

Northeast Market was established in 1885 in Middle East, East Baltimore, United States alongside the development of the area around Johns Hopkins Hospital. The market has gone through several iterations in its history, having been enlarged in 1896, replaced from a wood to brick structure in 1955, renovated again in the 1980s, and most recently updated in 2013.

== See also ==
- Baltimore Public Markets
