= Avenue Market =

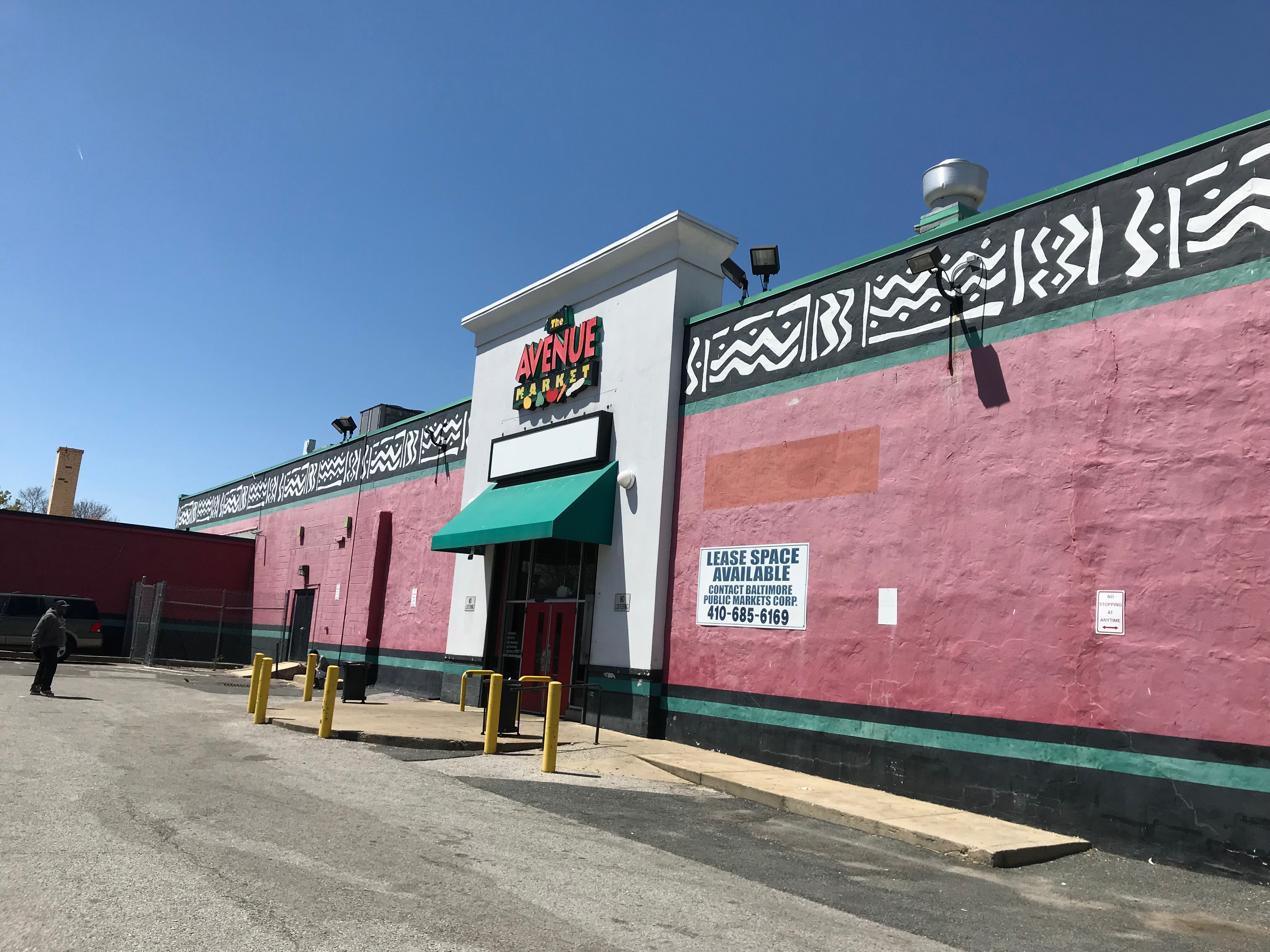
- Avenue Market southern entrance, 2018

- Location within Baltimore Location within Maryland Location within the United States

General information
- Location: 1700 Pennsylvania Avenue, Baltimore, Maryland, United States
- Coordinates: 39.3037°N 76.6357°W
- Opened: 1871

The Avenue Market, originally known as the Lafayette Market, is a historic marketplace built in 1871 in Upton, West Baltimore, United States. The market is on Pennsylvania Avenue and is near the Old West Baltimore Historic District. The market has seen multiple iterations, having been rebuilt after burning to the ground in 1953, renovated and given its current name in 1996, and renovated again in 2012. Another redevelopment is expected to begin in the summer of 2022.

Upton–Avenue Market station in the Baltimore Metro SubwayLink system serves the area and includes the market in its name.

== See also ==
- Baltimore Public Markets
