= WBJC =

Baltimore, Maryland; United States
- Broadcast area: Baltimore metropolitan area
- Frequency: 91.5 MHz (HD Radio)
- Branding: 91.5 WBJC

Programming
- Format: Classical music

Ownership
- Owner: Baltimore City Community College

History
- First air date: 1951
- Former frequencies: 88.1 MHz (1951–1962)
- Call sign meaning: Baltimore Junior College

Technical information
- Licensing authority: FCC
- Facility ID: 3654
- Class: B
- ERP: 50,000 watts (analog); 2,000 watts (digital)
- HAAT: 152 meters (499 ft)
- Transmitter coordinates: 39°23′11.4″N 76°43′50.9″W

Links
- Public license information: Public file; LMS
- Webcast: Listen live
- Website: wbjc.com

WBJC (91.5 FM) is a non-commercial educational radio station licensed to Baltimore, Maryland, United States. Owned by Baltimore City Community College, it airs a classical music format, with studios and offices located on Reisterstown Road in Baltimore.

WBJC's transmitter is sited off Reisterstown Road at Interstate 695 in Pikesville, Maryland.

== History ==
WBJC signed on in 1951. It originally broadcast on 88.1 MHz with a 250 watt transmitter obtained from military surplus by Edward Arnold, chief engineer. It served as a workshop for his students of radio in the Department of Speech, Drama and Radio. The radio department was headed by Clarence DeHaven at the Baltimore Junior College, which shared the campus of the Baltimore high school known as Baltimore City College. WBJC's antenna had a gain of -3db so that the effective radiated power was only 125 watts. However the antenna was on the top of the school's tower, which enjoyed a great view of almost all of Baltimore and much of surrounding counties. The station operated a flexible schedule as it was largely dependent on student volunteers. Generally the station signed off at 5 PM, but sports events often extended the broadcast day and led to weekend operation.

In the summer of 1952, Dick Ballard broached the idea of making use of the facilities in the evening for broadcasts of good music. With James Winship Lewis, director of the Handel Choir and member of the faculty of the department of Speech, Drama and Radio of the college, he secured the support of a number of civic leaders. With Dean Katenkamp's support, arrangements were completed. The evening broadcasts began on the 15th of September, 1952, running from 7 to 11 PM seven days a week. The rather limited operating expenses were underwritten by the Department of Adult Education with the support of Thomas A. Van Sant and Wilmer V. Bell. All of the expenses of preparing and presenting the programs, including securing the records, were borne by members of the volunteer staff, assisted by friends of the station. The evening staff programs consisted of classical music with occasional dramatic plays, talks, poetry readings and interviews with Baltimore musicians. Thursday night was Opera Night.

The volunteer staff included Dick Ballard, Jim Lewis, Mary George, Yvonne Morin, Paul Hicks, Stephen Hubard and Clare Milton, soon grew and by the April, 1953 had organized and elected as officers Clare Milton, Maurice Rushworth, Jeannette Spotten, Mary George, Les Keller and Arthur Cunliffe. The staff published a monthly program guide. One year's subscription was $1.00.). Sixty-odd volunteers produced the evening programs during its first five years. The 1957, 5th Anniversary Issue of the program guide gave special mention to the contributions of Yvonne Morin, program director for almost four years and of the succeeding evening staff manager, Bill Stotz. Over the two decades that the Evening Staff broadcast, Clare Milton was a consistent contributor, programming and often announcing the Monday evening broadcast and serving as Program Manager or Station Manager for many years.

Many early FM radios often would not tune as low as 88.1 MHz, so Clarence DeHaven, who oversaw operation of the station, in addition to his teaching and administrative duties, asked the FCC to allow a change of WBJC's frequency to one which was adjacent to the frequencies used by commercial broadcasters. This coincided with the Junior College's move to its own campus on Reisterstown Road. For many years the station occupied a wood-frame house on the campus, with studios on the second floor. The "Evening Staff" volunteer program ended in the early-1970s.

Matt Edwards, a classical music commentator on New York's WQXR-FM and WNCN hosted "Masterpieces of Music Before 1750." In September, 1957 the guide described the program for the month as an "anthology of musical examples from Gregorian Chant to J. S. Bach [which] contains the pieces discussed in Carl Parrish and John F. Ohl's book of the same title published, by W. W. Norton & Company. The recordings were made by Danish soloists and ensembles including Finn Videro, Aksel Schiotz, Else Brems, Niels Brincker, the Schola Gregoriana of Copenhagen, the Copenhagen Boys' and Men's Choir, the Madrigal Choir of the Danish State Radio and the Chamber Orchestra and Chorus of the Danish State Radio, and were under the direction of Mogens Wöldike. Listening to these programs while perusing the book would be an excellent introduction to the history of music."

== Current operations ==
WBJC's 50,000 watt signal reaches more than 180,000 listeners weekly across parts of Maryland, Pennsylvania, Delaware and the northern suburbs of Washington, DC.

WBJC produces several popular programs hosted by Jonathan Palevsky. Past Masters showcases notable performances from the past. Face the Music has a panel of local musical experts listening and offering critiques of new recordings. Vocalise focuses on vocal music (the station usually does not play vocal music on a daily basis). WBJC Operafest presents classic opera recordings in their entirety. Toccata focuses on keyboard music. Music in Maryland features locally performed concerts. Late night/early morning broadcasts are provided by Classical 24.

WBJC's primary competition for classical music listeners is WETA 90.9 FM in Washington, D.C. Although WETA-FM is a Washington metropolitan area station, its service contour covers portions of the Baltimore metropolitan area.

WBJC 5th Anniversary Program Guide September 1957
