= Lexington Market =

Historic market in downtown Baltimore

Coordinates: 39.29189°N 76.62175°W

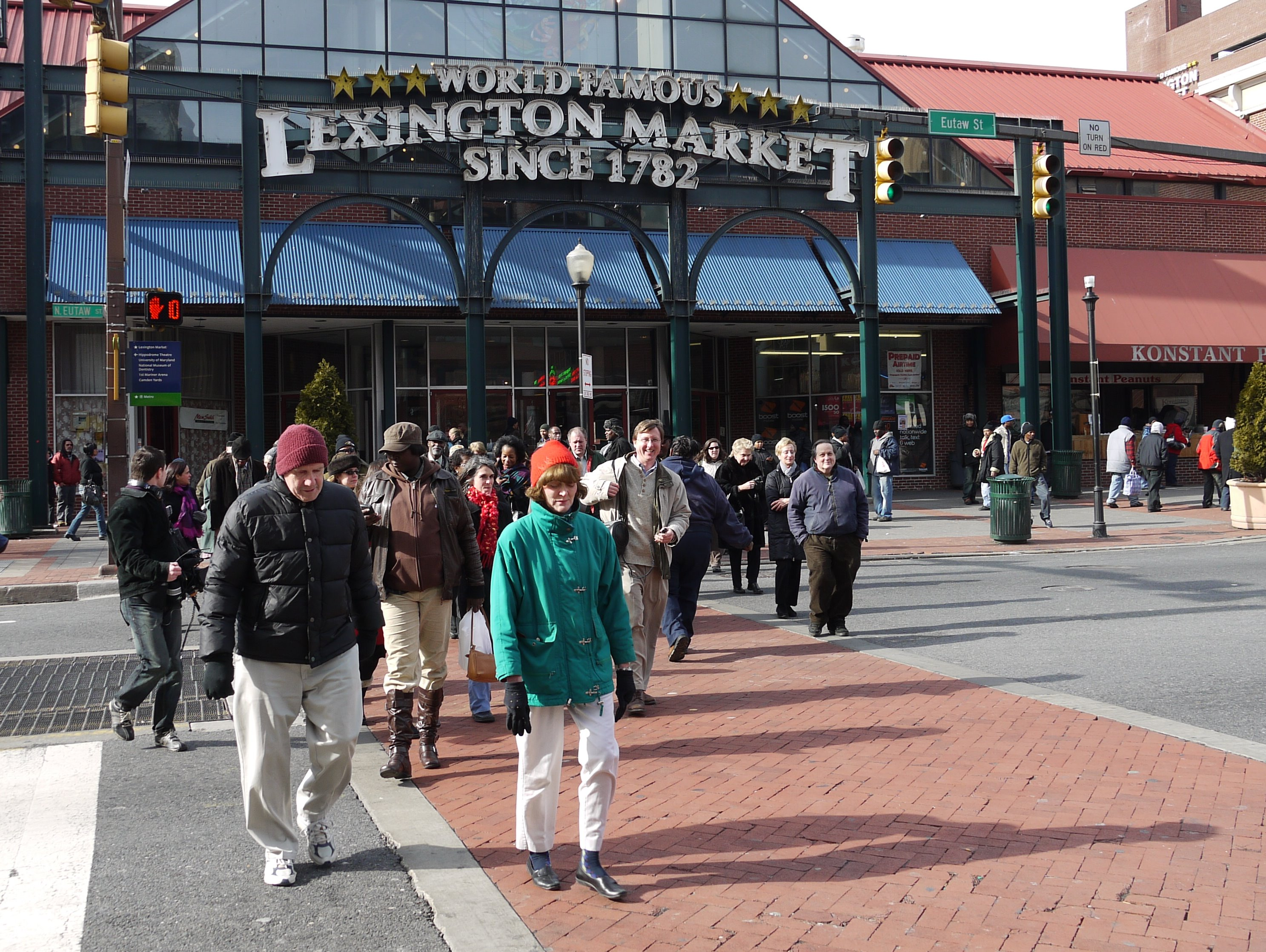
Lexington Market in 2011

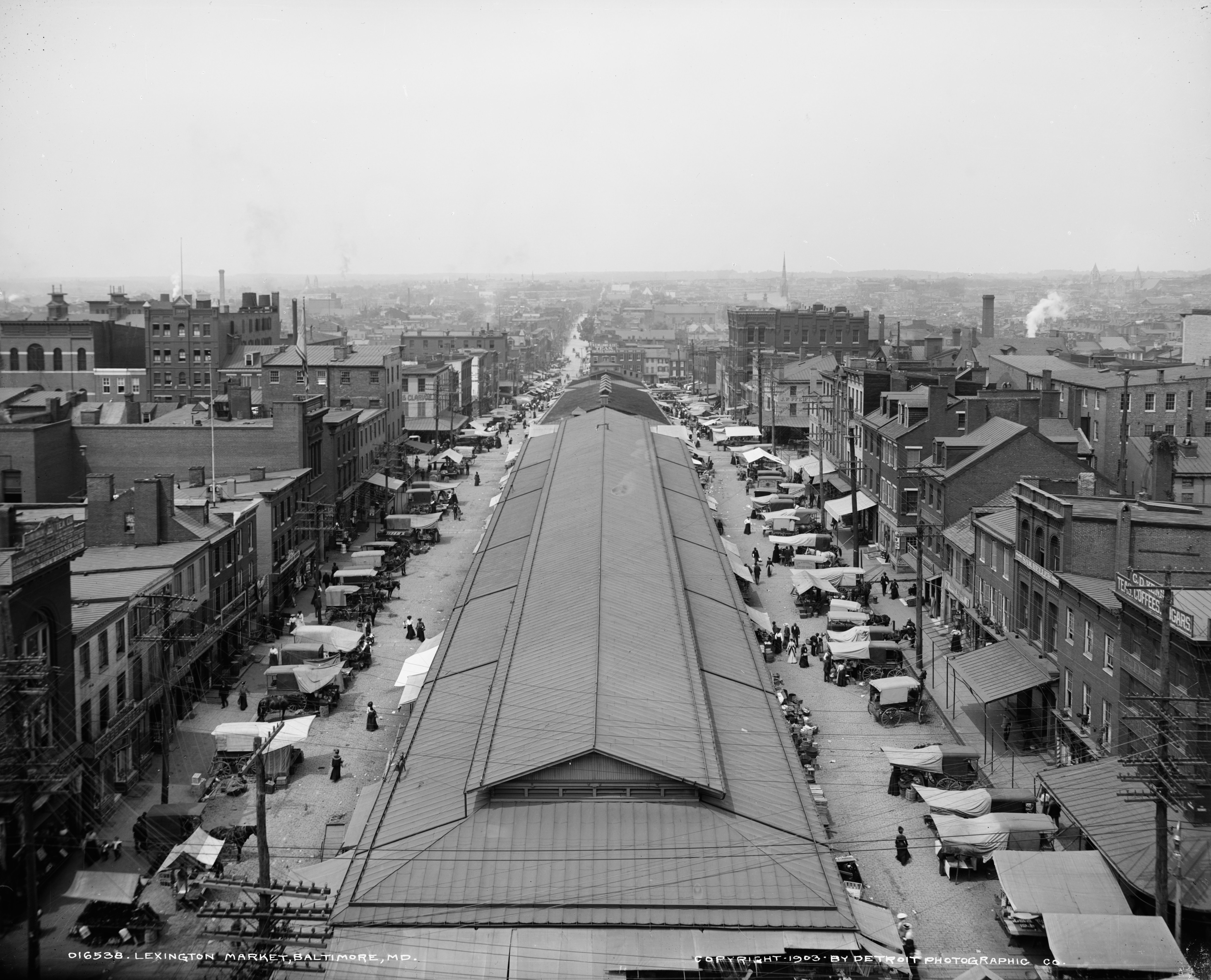
The market circa 1903

Lexington Market (originally, Western Precincts Market) is a historic market in Downtown Baltimore, Maryland. Established in 1782, the market is now housed in a 60,000-square-foot market shed building completed in 2022 that is home to 50 merchants and kiosks. Lexington Market is located near the Baltimore Light Rail and Baltimore Metro Subway stops of the same name, about six blocks north of Oriole Park at Camden Yards. It is owned by the City of Baltimore and managed by the nonprofit Baltimore Public Markets Corporation.

== History ==
Lexington Market is one of the longest-running public markets in the nation, having been around since 1782. The land for the original market was donated by General John Eager Howard, a famous Continental Army commander of the Maryland Line regiment. The land came from his estate "Belvedere" (also known as "Howard's Woods) west and north of what was then Baltimore Town.

The market originally operated without sheds and stalls. Farmers from Towson and Reisterstown would load up their horse-drawn wagons with ham, butter, eggs and produce, while watermen would bring their catches from the Chesapeake Bay. Originally, the market was open on Tuesdays, Friday, and Saturday from 2 a.m. until noon. A bell would ring to start and end the market day.

In 1871, a shed was built for the market. After the shed was destroyed in a 1949 fire, the city built the "East Market" building at Paca and Lexington Streets. A project to build a new market shed building began in 2020 and was completed in late 2022, when the East Market building was closed and slated for future development.

The history of slavery at Lexington Market includes both enslaved people as market workers and the sale of enslaved people at the market. In 2022, a sculpture was unveiled at Lexington Market called Robert and Rosetta, depicting an enslaved market worker named Robert and an enslaved girl named Rosetta who was auctioned off at the market. Robert was enslaved by former Maryland Governor George Howard and forced to sell butter, but later escaped to freedom. An advertisement for the sale of Rosetta was featured in the Baltimore Sun in March, 1838.

== Food ==
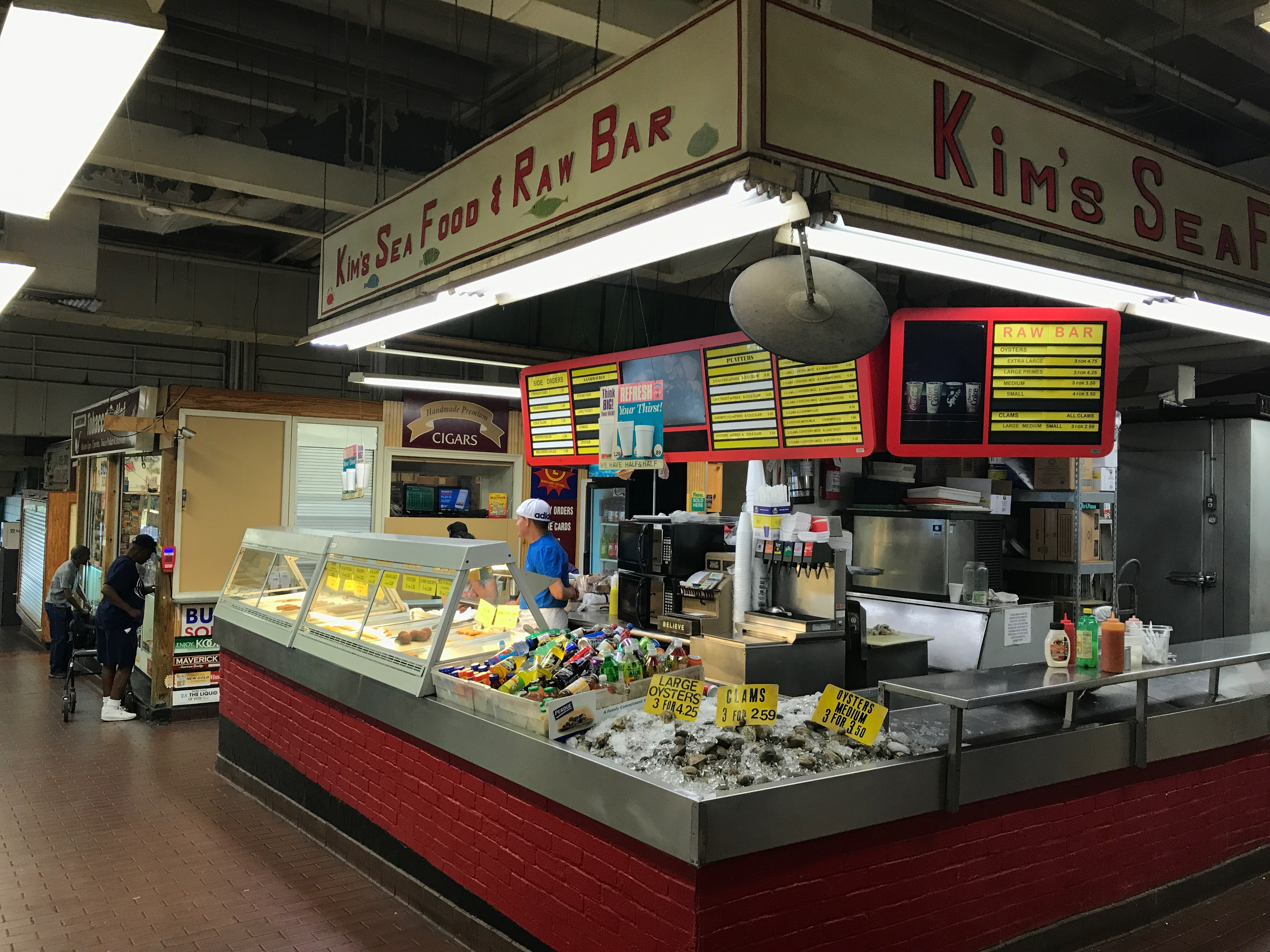
A seafood stall at the market in 2017

There are many shops featuring deli sandwiches, fried chicken, Chinese food, pizza, cheesesteaks, hot dogs, peanuts, and authentic ethnic foods - as well as a historic shoe repair stand and florist. Lexington Market is a popular lunch spot for working Baltimoreans as well as students at the nearby University of Maryland, Baltimore campus and the University of Baltimore.

The best known eatery at Lexington Market is Faidley's Seafood, known for its crabcakes and featured in 2012 on the "Mid-Atlantic" episode of the Travel Channel show, Adam Richman's Best Sandwich in America. Market Bakery sells "Berger Cookies", shortbread cookies topped with fudge that are a Baltimore favorite.

== As a Baltimore icon ==
Lexington Market is viewed by many as a place that shows the personality of the "real" Baltimore, as opposed to the more generic and tourist-oriented attractions found at the nearby Inner Harbor. Lexington Market takes part in the festivities leading up to the Preakness Stakes horse race by hosting the Preakness Crab Derby, where local business leaders and celebrities race the crustaceans on the arcade stage to raise money for charity.

Baltimore City Paper named Lexington Market the "Best Way to Introduce Outsiders to Baltimore" in 2001 and the "Best Place to Take Out of Town Visitors" in 2006. In 2022, the Market was included on a Food & Wine list of the best food experiences in Baltimore.

From time to time, the Lexington Market's east building hosted jazz bands during the lunch hour on Fridays and Saturdays. Particularly during the Christmas season, it has also hosted presentations by nearby public elementary and middle schools and private schools, such as West Cold Spring Lane's Baltimore Jr. Academy.

== See also ==
- Merchants' Exchange Building (Baltimore)
