= Faidley's Seafood =

Restaurant in Maryland

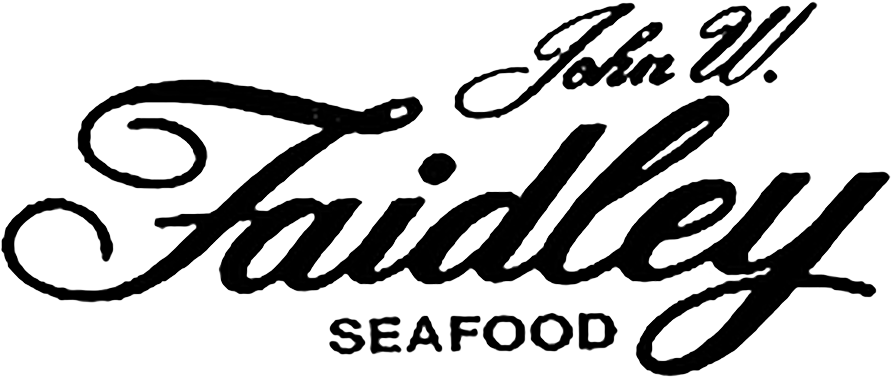

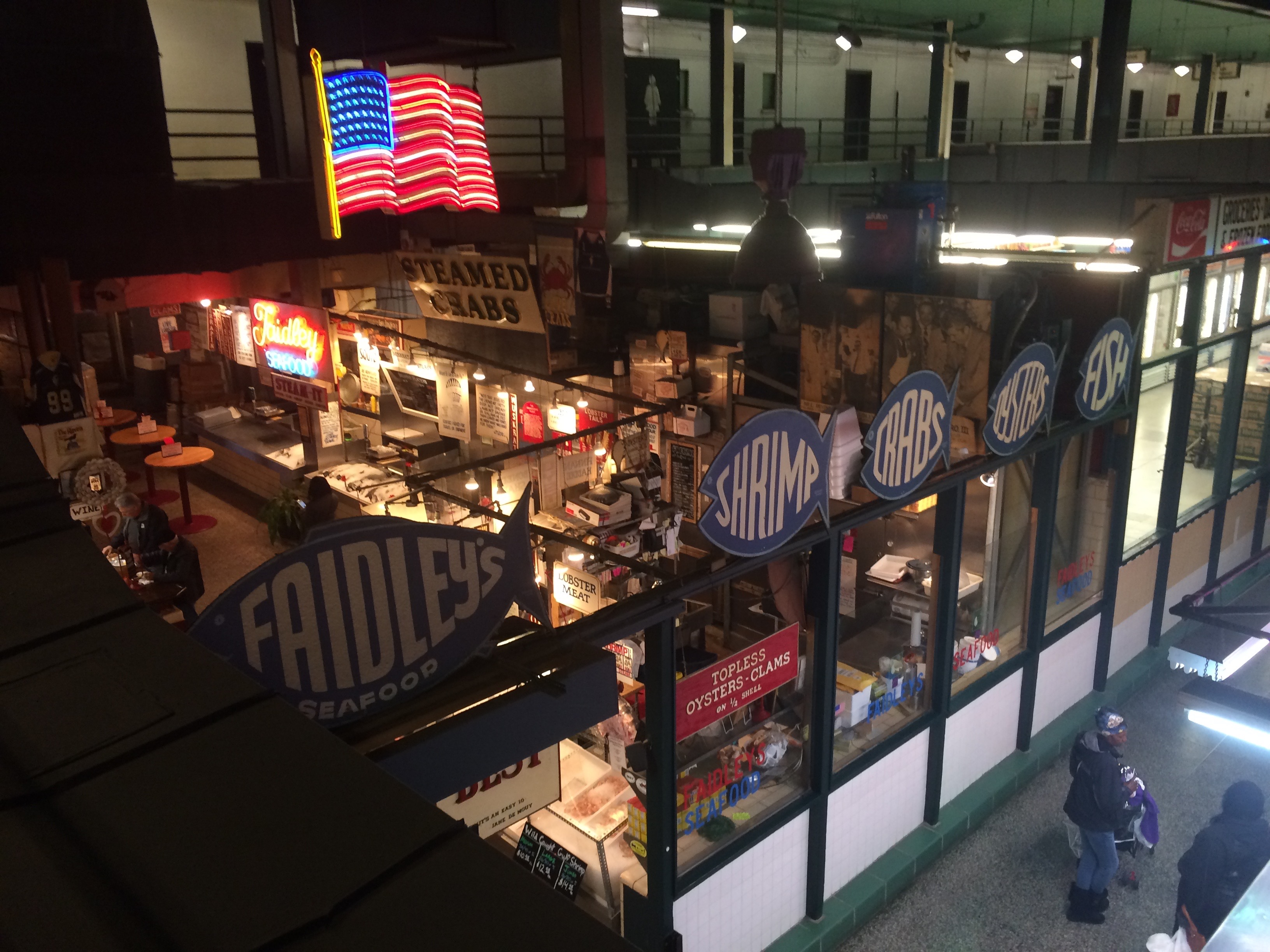
- The restaurant in 2017

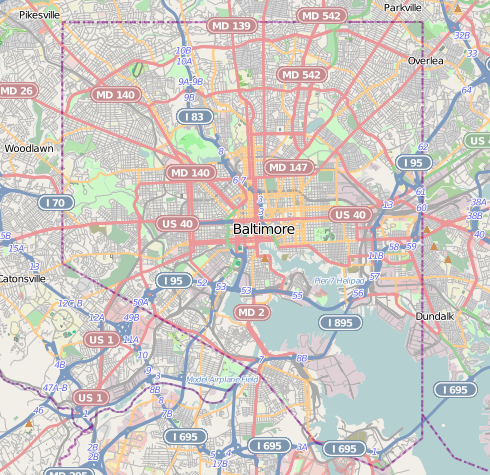
- Location within Baltimore Faidley's Seafood (Maryland) Faidley's Seafood (the United States)

Restaurant information
- Established: 1886
- Owner(s): Bill Devine; Nancy Devine
- Food type: Seafood
- Location: 203 N Paca St, Baltimore, MD 21201
- Coordinates: 39.2917°N 76.6222°W
- Website: www.faidleyscrabcakes.com

Faidley's Seafood is a seafood restaurant in Lexington Market in Baltimore, Maryland. It is one of the oldest restaurants of its kind in the Chesapeake Bay area. The restaurant is known for its lump crab cakes.

== History ==
Faidley's Seafood was founded in 1886 by John W. Faidley Sr. and a partner in two wooden sheds in Lexington Market. Faidley then bought his partner out and shortened the name of his business.

Faidley's son, John Faidley, Jr.'s daughter, Nancy Devine, and her husband Bill are the current owners of the shop, as of 2024.

== Menu ==
Items on Faidley's menu include: she-crab soup, clam chowder, gumbo, lobster bisque, oyster stew, crab cake, crab sandwich, fried shrimp, shrimp stuffed with crab, steamed shrimp, hake, lake trout, haddock, flounder, catfish, cod, fried clams, calamari, french fries, coleslaw, macaroni salad, macaroni and cheese, potato salad, pickled beets, collard, corn on the cob, and onion rings.

The restaurant sells over 1,000 of its signature crab cakes weekly. They were first served in 1987. Faidley's also ships them nationwide. The crab cakes are made from 1 lb (0.45 kg) of crab meat, saltine crackers, Old Bay Seasoning, and dry mustard.

== In popular culture ==
The restaurant has appeared in scenes from Sleepless in Seattle and Homicide: Life on the Street. Al Roker visited the restaurant in 2021 as part of his "Family Style" series. It was also featured on the Mid-Atlantic episode of the Travel Channel show Adam Richman's Best Sandwich in America in 2012.

Faidley's sponsors the Crab Derby, a charity race between blue crabs.
