= Upton–Avenue Market station =

Metro SubwayLink station

Coordinates: 39°18′18.17″N 76°38′11.8″W

Upton – Avenue Market
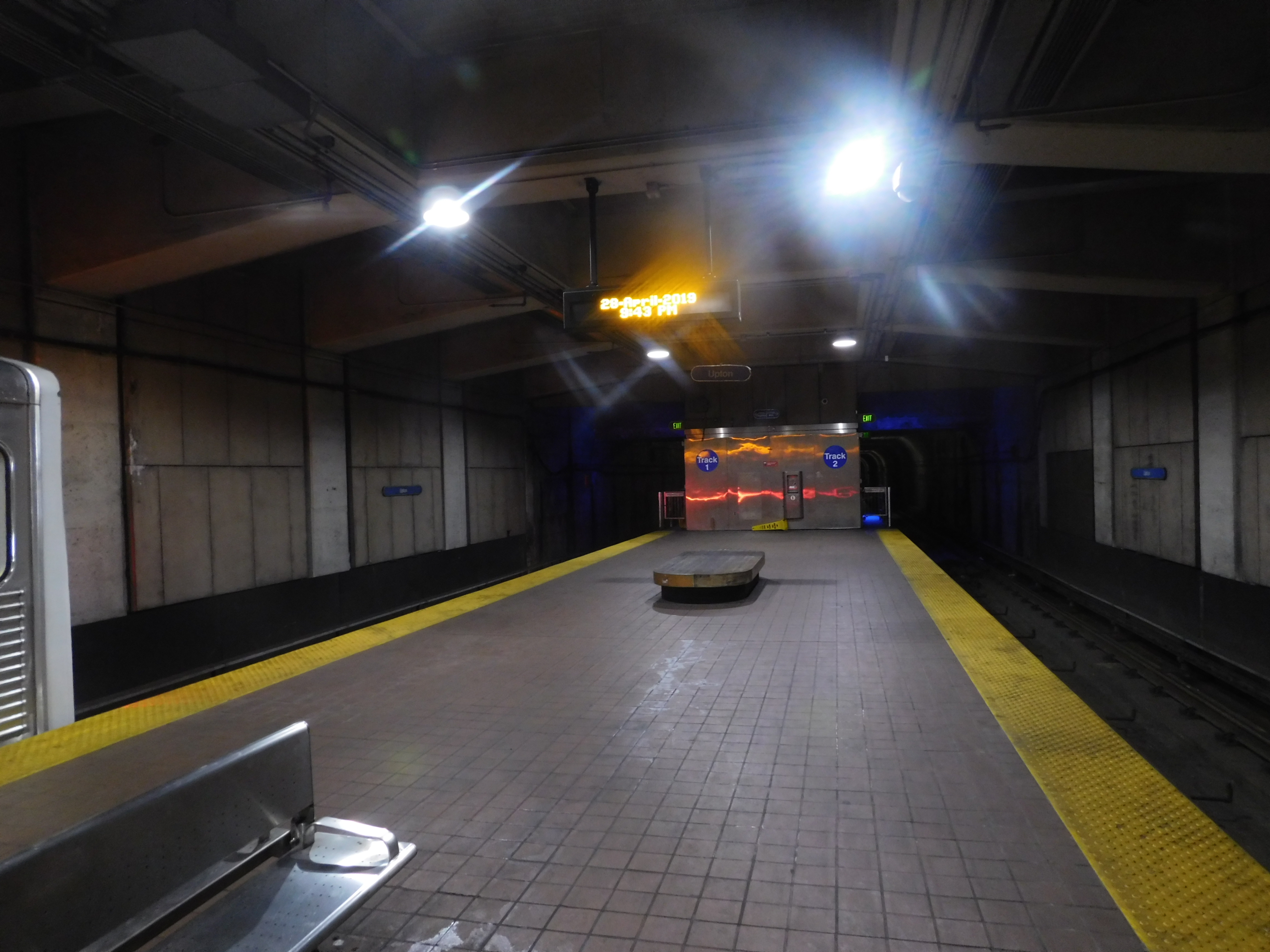
- Upton station in April 2019.

General information
- Location: 1702 Pennsylvania Avenue; Baltimore, Maryland, 21217
- Owner: Maryland Transit Administration
- Platforms: 1 island platform
- Tracks: 2
- Connections: MTA Maryland Buses

Construction
- Parking: No
- Accessible: Yes

History
- Opened: November 21, 1983

Passengers
- 2017: 1,551 daily

Services
Preceding station	Maryland Transit Administration	Following station
Penn–North toward Owings Mills	Metro SubwayLink	State Center toward Johns Hopkins Hospital
Location

Upton–Avenue Market station (formerly known simply as Upton station) is an underground Metro SubwayLink station in West Baltimore, Maryland located near the intersection of Pennsylvania Avenue and Laurens Street. The station takes its name from the surrounding Upton neighborhood and the nearby Avenue Market at 1700 Pennsylvania Avenue. It is the ninth most northern and western station on the line.

== History ==
Upton–Avenue Market station was referred to as the Laurens Street station during its planning and construction, in reference to the street which intersects Pennsylvania Avenue nearby.

=== Excavation and construction ===
The Laurens Street section of tunnels at Upton–Avenue Market station were constructed in a cut-and-cover operation through deeply weathered residual rock from a parent granitic gneiss material. Extensive exploration and mapping of the subsurface conditions was conducted prior to excavation and construction in order to obtain a detailed understanding of the heterogeneous mixture of soft and hard residual material at the site. This profile informed the support and mining procedures implemented for the project. Classification of the residual materials informed the tunnel design, which was supported by liner plates, steel ribs, posts, wall plates, and invert struts; the final lining was made from reinforced, cast in-place concrete. The presence of hard, dense rock-like fragments among the residual material necessitated some blasting methods in addition to conventional earth excavation methods.

=== Artwork ===
The MTA commissioned artist Romare Bearden $114,000 to create "Baltimore Uproar", a 14' x 46' Venetian glass mosaic in the station's mezzanine. Constructed in Italy before being shipped to the US, the mosaic features Baltimore-native Billie Holiday and six jazz instrumentalists. Primarily based in New York, Bearden worked as a cartoonist at the Baltimore Afro-American from 1935 to 1937.

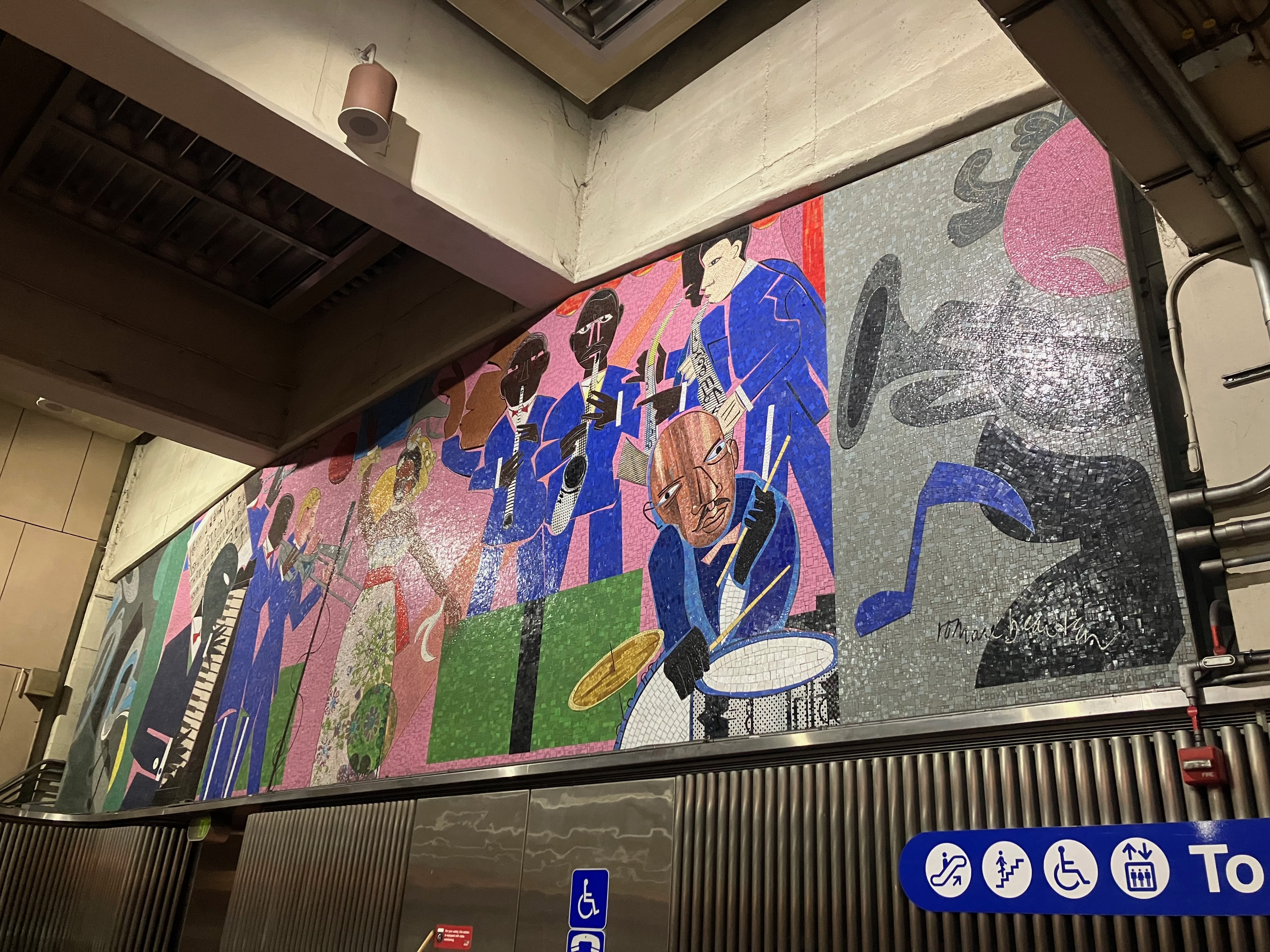
"Baltimore Uproar", a Romare Bearden glass mosaic featuring Billie Holiday in the station's mezzanine.
