= Penn-North station =

Metro SubwayLink station

Coordinates: 39.3094°N 76.6438°W

Penn-North
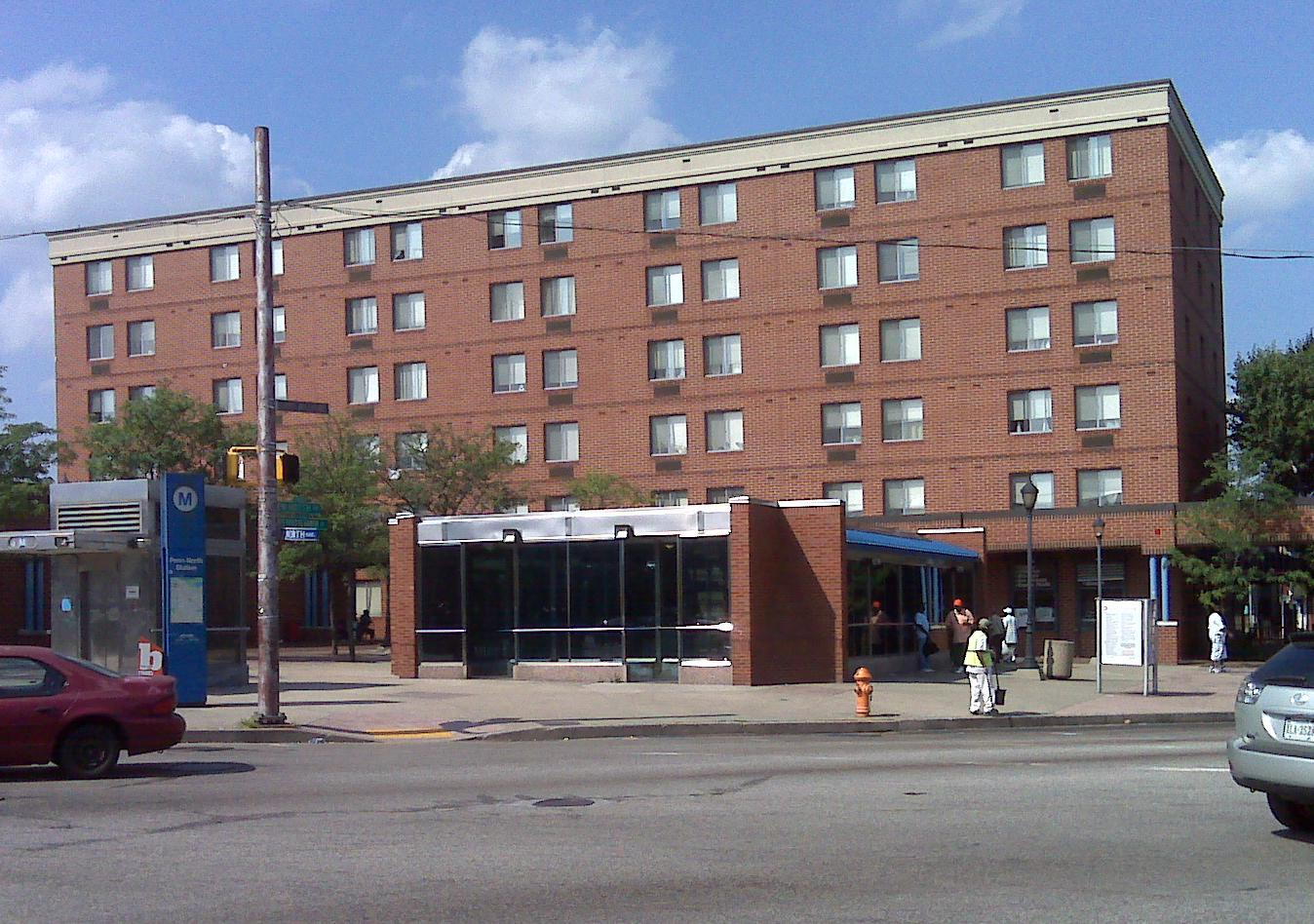
- The northern entrance of Penn-North station, viewed from the southern entrance (behind the camera).

General information
- Location: 2501 Pennsylvania Avenue and 1601 W. North Avenue; Baltimore, Maryland, 21217
- Owner: Maryland Transit Administration
- Platforms: 1 island platform
- Tracks: 2
- Connections: MTA Maryland Buses

Construction
- Parking: No
- Accessible: Yes

History
- Opened: November 21, 1983

Passengers
- 2017: 2,432 daily

Services
Preceding station	Maryland Transit Administration	Following station
Mondawmin toward Owings Mills	Metro SubwayLink	Upton–Avenue Market toward Johns Hopkins Hospital
Location

Penn-North station is an underground Baltimore Metro SubwayLink station and transit hub serving many buses in West Baltimore, Maryland. Its name comes from its location and neighborhood it serves Penn-North, at the corner of Pennsylvania and North Avenues. It is the deepest underground station, eighth most northern and western station on the line, and the first station when starting from Owings Mills that does not have free parking.

== Artwork ==
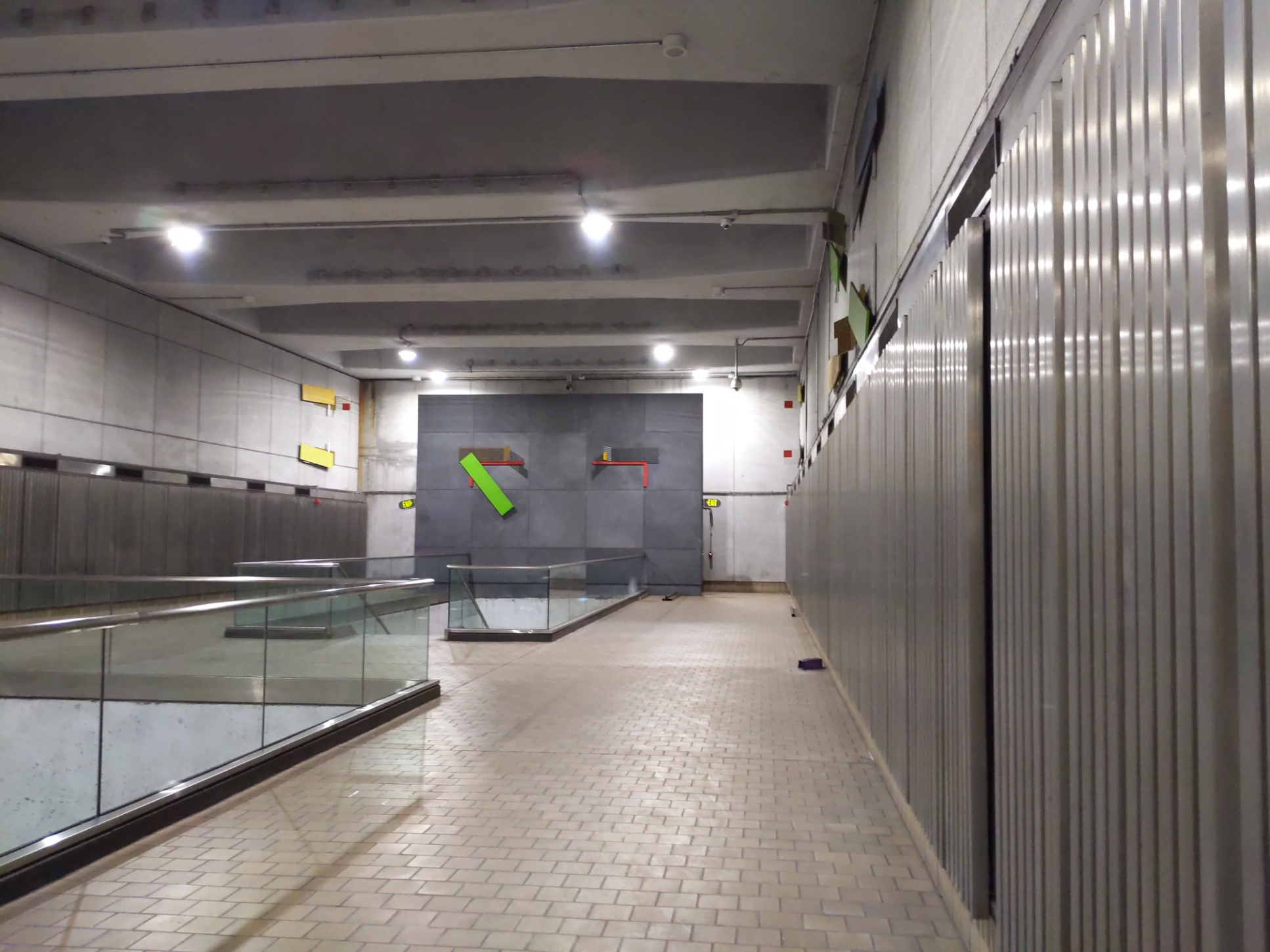
"Relay" abstract artwork by E. Marc Treib along wall at Penn-North station

In September 2021, the Maryland Transit Administration (MTA) announced the installation of a new mural project at Penn-North station painted by Baltimore artist Megan Lewis on a $60,000 commission. This is the first new artwork commissioned for the Baltimore Metro subway system in many years.

== History ==
=== Excavation and construction ===
Penn-North station was referred to as North Avenue station during its planning and construction, in reference to just North Avenue and not including Pennsylvania Avenue in the name.

The station is the deepest in the Baltimore Metro subway system, with its platform 120 feet below street level. Penn-North station, like the other underground stations of the Baltimore Metro subway system, was constructed using the cut-and-cover method. The excavation for the station mostly occurred in schist-derived residual materials. The underlying geology consists of the crystalline metamorphic rocks and their derivatives which are characteristic of the Piedmont physiographic region which contacts Cretaceous sedimentary formations along the diagonal Fall Line in Baltimore. Mondawmin station and Upton station, the other subway stops built in the northwestern portion of the underground alignment, are also underlain by metamorphic Piedmont material. The excavation for Penn-North station was supported by soldier piles anchored in the earth beneath it; extending through soil up to 50 feet below street level and through rock at greater depths.

References points were installed and monitored to survey the impact of structural settlement on the buildings adjacent to the excavation. The area around Penn-North station at the time of excavation included two-story residential rowhouses two- to three-story warehouse-type buildings. 0.14 feet of settlement was measured and attributed to gradual groundwater drawdown which occurred during the excavation, resulting in deep-seated lateral movements which caused little observable distress on the overlying structures.

Penn-North station opened in November 1983 when trains started running on the Baltimore Metro subway line. While investments occurred in the areas around many of the Baltimore Metro stations, initial plans for development around Penn-North station in the 1980s fell through.

== 2015 protests ==
In April 2015, riots broke out around the station protesting the death of Freddie Gray.
