= Baltimore City Community College =

Community college in Baltimore, Maryland, US

- Former names: Baltimore Junior College, Community College of Baltimore, New Community College of Baltimore
- Motto: Changing lives... Building Communities
- Type: Public community college
- Established: 1947
- Affiliations: Middle States Commission on Higher Education
- President: Debra L. McCurdy
- Faculty: 700
- Students: 4,864
- Location: Baltimore, Maryland, United States; 39.319971°N 76.662568°W Liberty Campus
- Campus: Urban
- Colors: Red and Black
- Mascot: Panther
- Website: bccc.edu

Baltimore City Community College (BCCC) is a public community college in Baltimore, Maryland. It is the only community college in the city and the only state-sponsored community college in the state. It is accredited by the Middle States Commission on Higher Education (MSCHE). It was founded in 1947 and has about 5,000 students enrolled in one of its campuses.

== History ==
Baltimore City Community College dates its origins to the Baltimore Junior College (BJC), founded as part of the Baltimore City Public Schools system in 1947 to provide post-high school education for returning World War II (1939/1941–1945) veteran soldiers and officers known as the Veterans Institute and was the inspiration of Harry Bard, its later dominant president and alumnus of the BCC. It was also one of the earliest examples of the growing "junior college" (also with some known as "city colleges" especially in California) an educational advancement movement which had roots in several early public high schools /secondary schools and small colleges and institutes in the post-Civil War (1861–1865) era and regained popularity at the beginning of the 20th century and has resulted in the growth of present-day "community colleges" in numerous cities/towns and counties all across America. This new type of college comprising the first two years of freshmen and sophomores with awarding an associate's instead of a bachelor's degree/diploma, was designed to serve and meet the academic and especially vocational and trade/job training of the intermediate needs between the high schools and large colleges and universities.

The BJC for its first decade of the late 1940s and 1950s was located on the third floor of the Baltimore City College, third oldest public high school in America located at 33rd Street and The Alameda in the northeast city in its landmark 1926–1928 "Castle on the Hill" massive stone structure of Collegiate Gothic style architecture surmounted by a distinctive 150 feet high tower. The symbolic gray stone tower besides providing a sight-seeing observation level of the surrounding residential neighborhoods and five mile distant downtown skyline and harbor to the south, also coincidentally housed the first studio and transmitting antenna for the school's public radio radio station WBJC-FM broadcasting programs across the metro area. BCC (also known as "City"), was a specialized academic magnet secondary school for the arts, humanities and social sciences, and had acquired its distinctive name as a result of its late 19th century curriculum of 5 and 6 years encompassing an early program combining both high school and early college education.

By 1959, the Baltimore Junior College had outgrown its sharing of the BCC "castle" and campus on 33rd Street and had relocated to a park-like campus of its own in the northwest city along Liberty Heights Avenue nearby the newly constructed huge popular Mondawmin Mall which both had replaced the former George Brown estate and mansion, one of the last open spaces in northwestern Baltimore. Around the same time, BJC was separated from the Baltimore City Public Schools and became a distinct entity of the City of Baltimore municipal government structure and with an independent president of the Junior College who was not also the principal of the Baltimore City College (high school) such as previously Chester H. Katzenkamp. In 1967, the name of the school was changed as the title of "Baltimore Junior College" was dropped and was renamed as the Community College of Baltimore (CCB) in order to not be confused with the older City College, now exclusively a secondary school and acquire the new name increasingly being used across the nation by similar growing numbers of institutions known for several decades as junior colleges or city colleges but now as Community College. By the middle of the 1970s, Harry Bard's ideal of a second additional campus on a tight city block in a high-rise tower in the envisioning of a revitalized downtown surrounding the former "Basin" of the Northwest Branch of the Patapsco River and Baltimore Harbor and Port facilities which were gradually moving further downstream along shores with greater spaces and anchorage depths. This industrial movement left the basin with its piers, docks, warehouses, cranes etc. of port facilities more unused and declining which were adjacent to center city skyscrapers, office buildings and commercial businesses along the streets. The newly renamed Inner Harbor in the late 1950s was eventually added with Bard's dream of an educational institution closer to the residential areas of East and Southeast Baltimore and was realized later with the construction of two buildings along East Lombard Street by Market Place, to the north across East Pratt Street from Piers 5 and 6. These were later named the Bard and Lockwood Buildings.

On July 1, 1990, the Maryland General Assembly created a new public college, New Community College of Baltimore. The College was granted permanent State status and renamed Baltimore City Community College in 1992. Also in 1992, the college was censured by the American Association of University Professors for "not observing the generally recognized principles of academic freedom and tenure."

In the 2000s, BCCC began to experience significant difficulties. Problems began to surface in 2004 when faculty held a public protest over issues related to remedial courses and governance. In 2010, faculty gave BCCC president Williams a vote of no-confidence and the state legislature held back funding. These troubles worsened in 2011. BCCC's regional accreditor, the Middle States Commission on Higher Education, placed BCCC on probation because of "concerns about the school's ability to evaluate student learning." To address these problems, Maryland governor Martin O'Malley replaced the majority of BCCC's board of trustees with new members. In 2012, two years after the faculty's initial vote of no confidence, the board of trustees removed Carolane Williams as president of the college. The interim president was Dr Carolyn Hull Anderson, followed by president and CEO, Gordon F. May.

In the summer of 2014 BCCC was warned by the Middle States Commission that the college's accreditation was in jeopardy. MSCHE reaffirmed its accreditation on June 25, 2015.

In 2015 NASA selected BCCC and four other higher education institutions to share in $6 million as part of its Minority University Research and Education Project (MUREP), an initiative that aims to provide educator training and expand science, technology, engineering and math (STEM) course offerings.

In 2017, the Maryland General Assembly passed into law HB1595, which required BCCC to complete a list of 12 realignment tasks; altered the composition of the Board of Trustees; and established specific criteria for the next BCCC president. Kurt L. Schmoke, former mayor of Baltimore, was appointed the new Chair of the Board of Trustees. President Gordon F. May retired at the end of the 2017-2018 academic year. Dr. James H. Johnson Jr. served as interim president, and on May 1, 2019, Dr. Debra L. McCurdy was named the 14th President of BCCC.

On November 21, 2024 MSCHE reaffirmed the school's accreditation.

In October 2026, President McCurdy announced her retirement from BCCC effective December 31, 2026. Howard County Executive Calvin Ball will take over as interim president when President McCurdy steps down.

== Campuses ==
BCCC has four major locations.

=== Liberty Heights Campus ===
The main campus of BCCC is on Liberty Heights Avenue, located west of The Maryland Zoo in Baltimore. In addition to classes and student services, the Liberty Main Campus provides services including childcare, a library, and a fitness center.

=== Downtown Harbor Campus ===
The Workforce Development and Continuing Education is located on Lombard Street near the Inner Harbor.

=== Reisterstown Plaza Campus ===
The Reisterstown Road Plaza Campus houses additional classroom space, primarily used by WDCE.

=== Life Sciences Institute at the University of Maryland BioPark ===
The Life Sciences Institute started in 1987, is one of the nation's oldest and foremost community college biotechnology training programs. In 2009, it was moved to one of the nation's top research campuses at University of Maryland's BioPark.

== Radio station ==
Since 1951, the college has operated WBJC radio station. It is an FM, non-commercial, station at 91.5 MHz that broadcasts classical music and arts information programming nearly 24 hours daily all week. The station studios and office is located in northwest Baltimore, Maryland and the antenna is near the junction of I-695 and Reisterstown Road. The station's 50,000 watt signal reaches more than 180,000 listeners weekly across Maryland, Washington, DC and portions of the surrounding states.

== Athletics ==
BCCC is a member of the Maryland Junior College Athletic Conference which belongs to Region XX (20) of the National Junior College Athletic Association. BCCC athletes compete in men's and women's basketball, men's and women's cross country.

== Notable alumni ==
- Wayne Clark (politician), member of the West Virginia House of Delegates for the 65th and 99th districts
- Leroy Loggins – Professional Basketball Player, Olympian
- Dave Johnson – Former Pitcher, Baltimore Orioles
- Kweisi Mfume – an American politician and the former President/CEO of the NAACP, as well as a five-term Democratic Congressman from Maryland's 7th congressional district, serving in the 100th through 104th Congress
- Moses Ingram – actor and writer, Emmy Award nominee
- Barry Levinson – screenwriter, Academy Award-winning film director, actor and producer of film and television
- Joan Carter Conway – politician who represents district 43 in the Maryland State Senate
- Robert W. Curran – member of the Baltimore City Council representing the Third Council District
- Carolyn J. Krysiak – politician who represented the 46th legislative district in the Maryland House of Delegates
- Elizabeth Habte Wold – an Ethiopian artist known for her mixed-media work.
- Johan Hegg – singer of the Swedish Melodic-Death metal band, Amon Amarth
- Bernard C. Young - Mayor of Baltimore
