= Reservoir Hill, Baltimore =

Neighborhood in Baltimore, Maryland, United States

- Reservoir Hill Historic District
- U.S. National Register of Historic Places
- U.S. Historic district
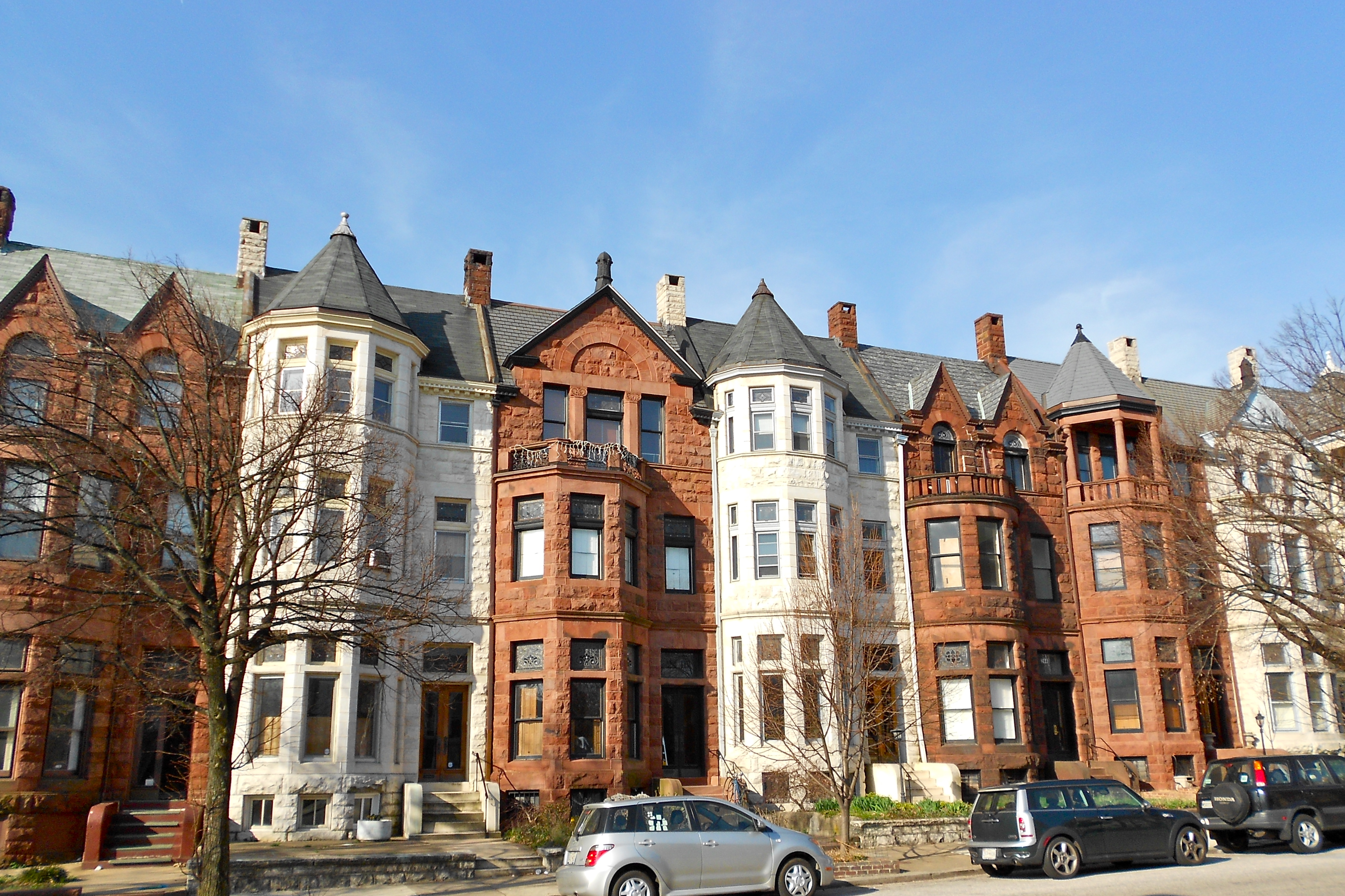
- Reservoir Hill Historic District, March 2012

- Location within Baltimore Location within Maryland Location within the United States
- Location: North Ave.--Madison Ave.--Druid Park Lake Dr.--Mt. Royal Terrace, Baltimore, Maryland
- Coordinates: 39°18′54″N 76°38′0″W
- Area: 200 acres (81 ha)
- Architectural style: Early Republic, Late Victorian
- NRHP reference No.: 04001376
- Added to NRHP: December 23, 2004

Reservoir Hill is a historic neighborhood in the city of Baltimore, Maryland, United States. It is located south of Druid Hill Park, north of Bolton Hill, east of Penn-North, and west of Jones Falls. It is bounded by Druid Park Lake Drive, the Jones Falls Expressway, North Avenue (U.S. Route 1), and McCulloh Street. It is contained in the 21217 ZIP code.

== About the area ==
Reservoir Hill has some of the best examples of Victorian, Italianate and Second Empire style homes in Baltimore. The housing stock features a wide variety of nineteenth century architecture, including ornate Victorian mansions overlooking the Druid Hill Park, brownstones, and the smaller brick rowhouses that characterize much of Baltimore. Part of Reservoir Hill is a historic district listed on the National Register of Historic Places. Recent restoration efforts have begun to revert the neighborhood back to its prominent stature.

Portions of Reservoir Hill are within easy walking distance of the North Avenue station on the Baltimore Light Rail line and the Penn-North station on the Baltimore Metro Subway, as well as Pennsylvania Station on Amtrak's Northeast Corridor.

During the late 19th and early 20th centuries, Baltimore was the second largest port for immigrants coming to the United States behind Ellis Island of New York, and many of these immigrants lived in Reservoir Hill. Many came over from the Russian Empire (mostly Jews and Ukrainians), and certain parts of Reservoir Hill housed many migrants from other parts of Eastern Europe. The neighborhood is now majority African-American.

A synagogue originally built in Reservoir Hill by the Chizuk Amuno Congregation in 1922 is now the home of Beth Am, one of two non-Orthodox Jewish congregations located within the city limits of Baltimore.

=== Mount Royal ===
A section of Reservoir Hill is known as Mount Royal. It is just across North Avenue from Bolton Hill and close to the Jones Falls. It is generally more expensive and contains very well preserved homes. A portion of this has been declared the Mount Royal Terrace Historic District by Baltimore City.

== Notable residents ==
Writer Gertrude Stein lived in Reservoir Hill for a short period of time on Linden Avenue, near Whitelock Street in what is also called the David Bachrach House.

Pulitzer Prize winning poet Karl Shapiro was born on Brooks Lane in Reservoir Hill. Shapiro was appointed the fifth Poet Laureate Consultant in Poetry to the Library of Congress in 1946.

Soviet spy Whittaker Chambers and suspected spy Alger Hiss lived in the area. Hiss grew up on 1427 Linden Avenue. Chambers lived on Mount Royal Terrace just prior to his defection from the Soviet Underground in April 1938. Earlier in the 1930s, he lived on Eutaw Place. Spy photographer Felix Inslerman worked for Chambers and lived on Callow Avenue.

== Mt. Royal Terrace (1890-1940) ==
The Baltimore City directories from Enoch Pratt Free Library indicate that many residents of Mt. Royal lived in their homes for several decades. It was a community based neighborhood where everyone knew each other. The Baltimore City directories also show that many residents were employees of blue collar companies. Many people from these blocks were either factory workers, construction workers, electricians, police officers, nurses, etc. The historical Baltimore Sun contains a vast amount of information regarding residents of Mt. Royal Terrace between 1890 - 1940.

Many residents of Mt. Royal lived quiet hard working lives. One man named Samuel W. Filbert is an example of a common Mt. Royal resident. Filbert resided on 2200 Mt. Royal Terrace with his wife "Miss May (Filbert). Samuel, like many of the Mt. Royal residents worked a rigorous blue collar job as a construction worker for the "Filbert Paving and Construction Company." It was a family owned business located in Baltimore. Samuel was the General manager of the company until he joined the military. Like many young men, Filberts career was affected by World War I. Filbert became a soldier in the 4th Maryland Regiment where he would soon be promoted to Lieutenant - Colonel of the infantry. Filbert became a very decorated military figure in the Mt. Royal area. He was held several titles in the 4th Regiment of Maryland including Captain and Lieutenant - Colonel.

Samuel W. Filbert represented the common lifestyle of a resident in not only the Mt. Royal area, but Baltimore city during the late 19th and early 20th centuries. The people in these areas were very hard working, communal, and loyal to the area. Many of the residents passed their homes off to their children, nephews, and nieces. 1890–1940 was a hard time in American history. The Great Depression greatly affected many lives during the 1920s, 30s and 40s. Many residents of Baltimore lost job opportunities. Many young men took advantage of joining the military. The Filbert Paving and Construction Company went out of business right after the stock market crash of 1929. Samuel Filbert elected to join the military in order to earn some type of wage. In the military he was fortunate enough to become very successful. Despite The Great Depression, Mt. Royal still remained very much alive.

== Eutaw Place and Madison Park ==
Eutaw Place and Madison Park is also designated as a historic district. It is located on the western side of Reservoir Hill. This section of the neighborhood includes many grand houses on Eutaw Place and Madison Avenue, as well three large apartment buildings that are located directly across from Druid Hill Park on Madison and Eutaw. Chauncey Brooks' mansion Cloverdale was once located in this area.

== Demographics ==
- Population: 5,263 (According to the 2020 Census)
- Black/African-American: 79.1%
- White/Caucasian: 12.8%
- Hispanic/Latino (of any race): 2.6%
- Two or More Races 4.6%
- Asian/Pacific Islander: 1.0%
- Native American: 0.4%
- Other 0.1%
