= Mondawmin, Baltimore =

Coordinates: 39°18′51″N 76°39′15″W

Mondawmin
- Neighborhood of Baltimore
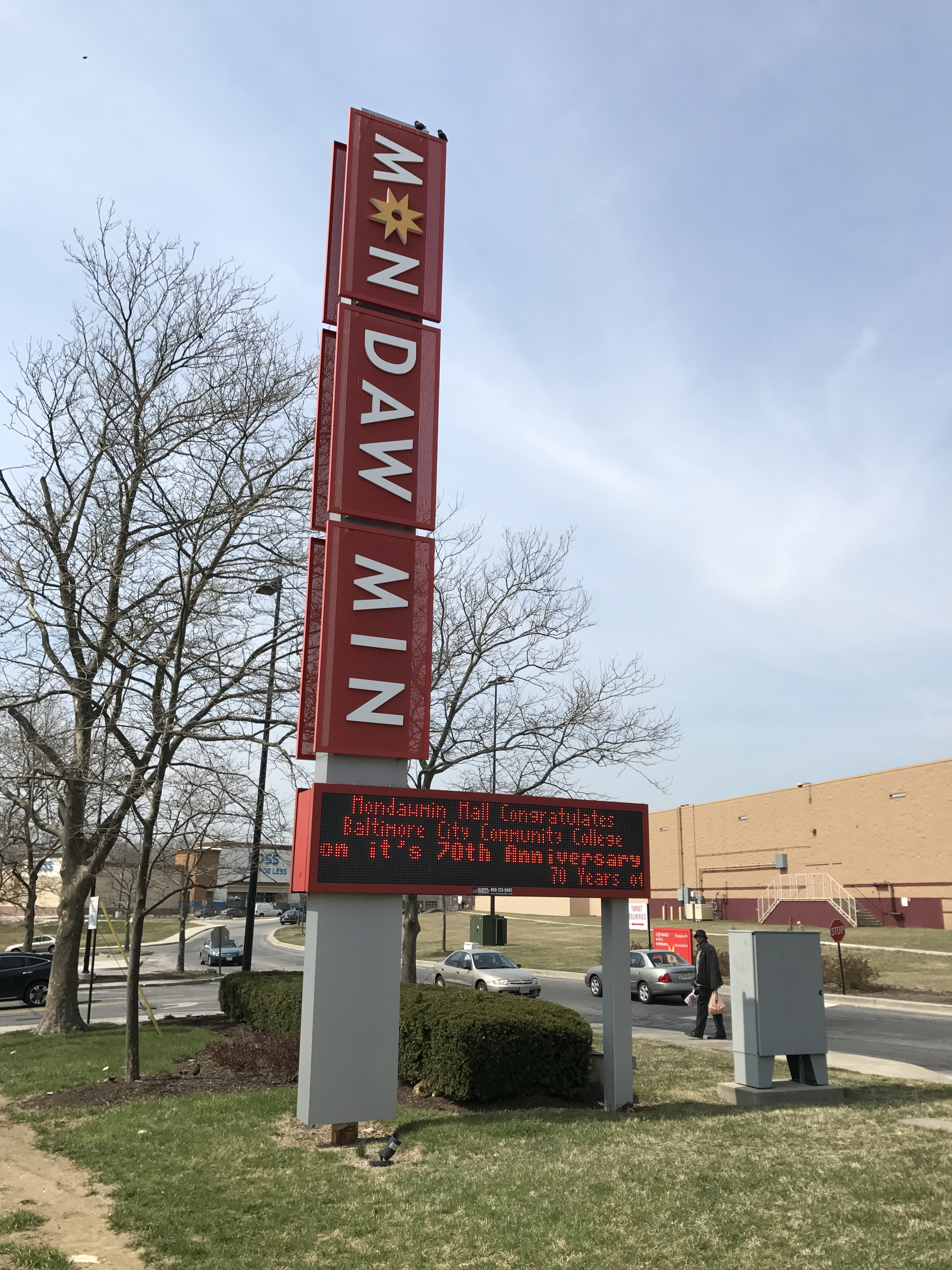
- Gwynns Falls Parkway Entrance to Mondawmin Mall

- Location within Baltimore
- Country: United States
- State: Maryland
- City: Baltimore
- Time zone: UTC-5 (Eastern)
  - Summer (DST): EDT
- ZIP code: 21217
- Area code: 410, 443, and 667

Mondawmin is a neighborhood located in the Western district of Baltimore, Maryland, United States. The neighborhood is bordered by Druid Hill Park, the Whitelock community, and Lower Park Heights. Included within or adjacent to its boundaries are Frederick Douglass High School and Mondawmin Mall. The Baltimore Metro Subway serves the neighborhood through a station at Mondawmin Mall that also functions as a hub for numerous bus routes.

== History ==
The area was estate countryside in the 19th century, characterized by large homes built by prominent city residents on the hilly land several hundred feet above the Inner Harbor. Mondawmin takes its name from a 73-acre country estate established by Dr. Patrick Macaulay (1795–1849), a physician, city councilman, B&O Railroad director, and patron of the arts.

Tradition holds that the poet Henry Wadsworth Longfellow, while visiting Macaulay, was asked what to name the estate and, looking out over its corn fields, replied, "Why not Mondamin, after the Indian corn god?" Local historians have questioned the account, noting that there is no record of Longfellow visiting Baltimore and that his poem The Song of Hiawatha, the source of the name "Mondamin," was not published until 1855—well after the estate was named. The name more likely derives directly from the Ojibwe word for corn. Mapmakers later added a "w" to the spelling.

Beginning in the late 1940s and early 1950s, many residents moved into the community as the area developed into a cultural and educational center for African Americans, drawn in part by the historically Black Coppin Teachers College. Robert W. Coleman, for whom a local elementary school is named, was a Baltimore resident and piano tuner who lost his sight around 1911 and became an advocate for people with disabilities, founding the Association for the Handicapped in 1913 and helping to establish "sight-saving" classes in city schools.

== Location ==
The neighborhood is bounded by Longwood Street and Hilton Parkway to the west, Liberty Heights Avenue and Druid Park Drive to the north, Druid Hill Park and Fulton Avenue to the east, and North Avenue to the south. It occupies part or all of the ZIP Codes 21215, 21216, and 21217.

== Description ==
Mondawmin is a historically African American community. The neighborhood clusters around Mondawmin Mall, an urban shopping mall, and features schools ranging from the elementary level to a four-year college, green space along its boulevards and side streets, small businesses, churches, and neighborhood associations.

== Highlights ==
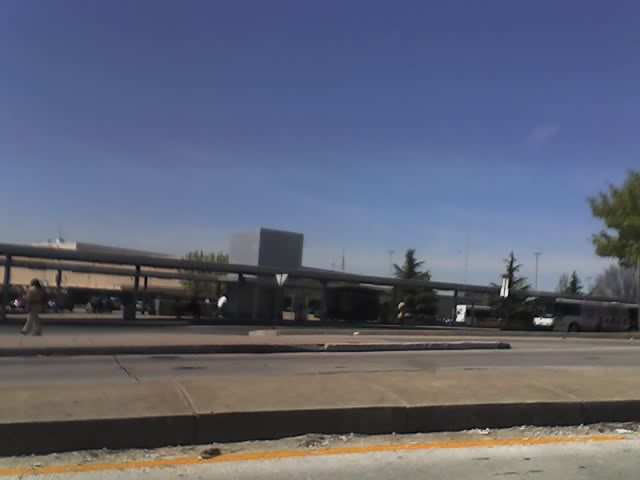
The Mondawmin Metro Subway Station

- Mondawmin Mall, an urban shopping center featuring a full-service grocery store and more than 100 stores and shops.
- Mondawmin Transit Hub: a major West Baltimore transit center that connects the Metro SubwayLink station with 11 bus routes.
- Bon Secours Liberty Village, a senior living community operated by Bon Secours.

Within walking distance is Druid Hill Park, which includes basketball and tennis courts, the Howard Peters Rawlings Conservatory, and the Maryland Zoo. Nearby college institutions include Coppin State University and one of two campuses of Baltimore City Community College.

== Housing stock ==
Most of the neighborhood's residential areas consist of brick rowhouses. Those built before World War II have large front porches and in some cases Victorian styling, while those built after the war tend to be two-story brick structures on wider lots than are generally found in the inner city. A few single dwellings near the Walbrook neighborhood reflect their origins as summer homes built in the early 20th century.

== Schools ==
The following schools serve the Mondawmin area; not all are located within the neighborhood's boundaries.

- Coppin State University
- Baltimore City Community College
- Frederick Douglass High School
- Bard High School Early College Baltimore
- Robert W. Coleman Elementary School
- Gwynns Falls Elementary School
- Matthew A. Henson Elementary School
- Carver Vocational-Technical High School

== Library branch ==
- Enoch Pratt Free Library – Penn North
