= Mondawmin Mall =

Shopping mall in Baltimore, Maryland

Coordinates: 39.3172°N 76.6547°W

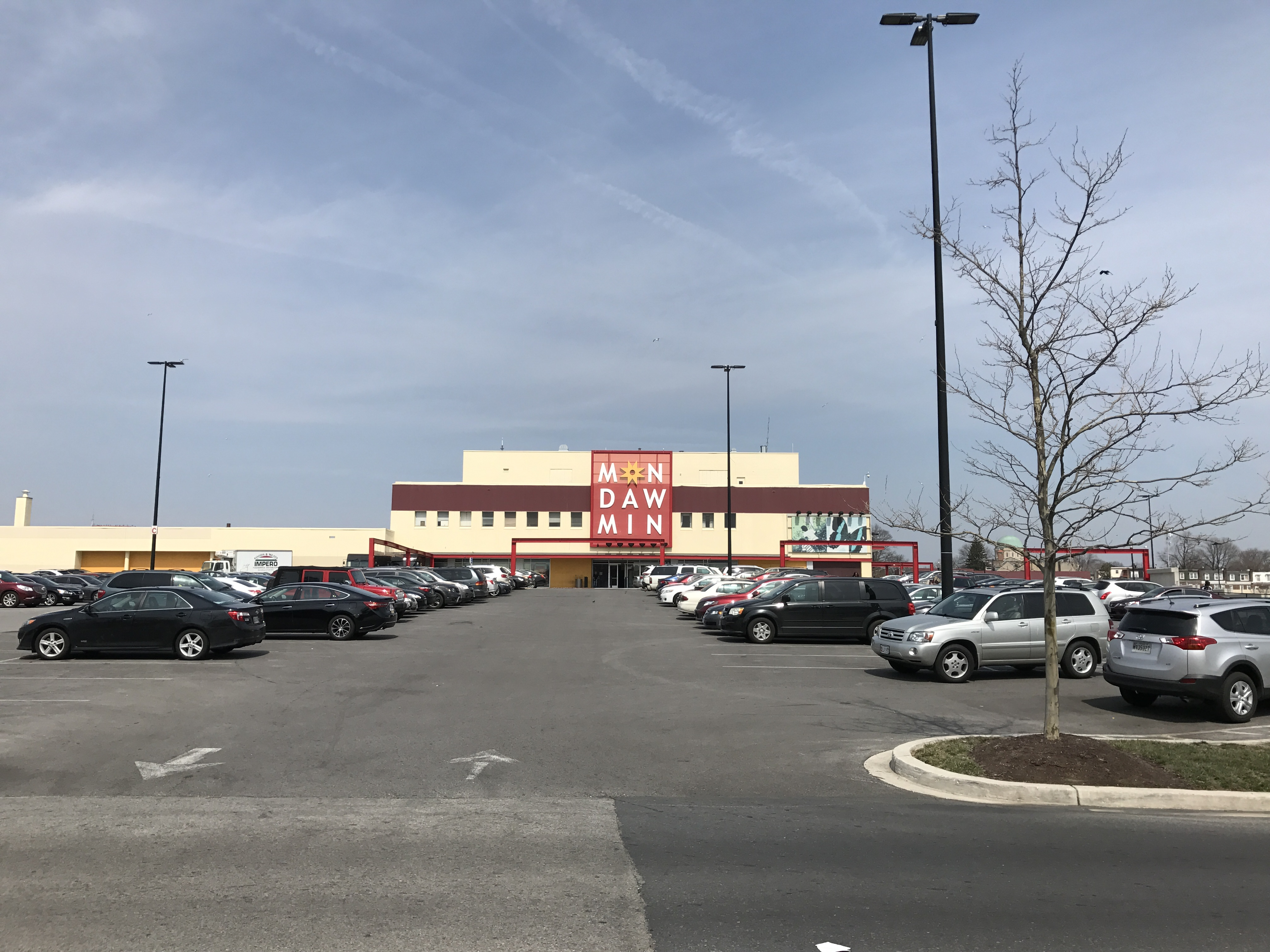
- Main entrance (March 2017)
- Location: West Baltimore, Maryland, U.S.
- Address: 2401 Liberty Heights Avenue, 21215
- Opened: October 14, 1956; 70 years ago (enclosed 1963)
- Renovated: 1963; 1982-1985; 2007-2008
- Previous names: Mondawmin Center (1956–1963)
- Developer: The Rouse Company
- Manager: GGP
- Owner: GGP
- Num. of stores: 110
- Num. of anchor tenants: 2 (formerly 3; Target/Sears stores demolished)
- Floor area: 385,535 square feet (35,817.4 m^{2})
- Floors: 3
- Parking: Parking lot (Parking garage demolished)
- Public transit: Mondawmin: Metro SubwayLink MTA Maryland bus: 22, 26, 29, 79, 82, 83, 91, CityLink Navy, CityLink Yellow
- Website: www.mondawmin.com

Mondawmin Mall is a regional mall in the Mondawmin neighborhood of West Baltimore, Maryland, United States. The mall was a development of the Mondawmin Corporation, a subsidiary set up in 1952 by James W. Rouse and Hunter Moss under the Moss-Rouse Company. When it first opened in October 1956, it had an open-air plan and was called the Mondawmin Center. It was later enclosed and renamed the Mondawmin Mall in 1963.

== History ==
=== 1949–1956: Development and opening ===
The mall takes its name from Mondawmin Manor, a Greek Revival estate built on the site in 1841; the name derives from an Ojibwe word for corn. In 1949, Alexander Brown Griswold approached James W. Rouse and asked what he could develop on 46 acres of the property on the outskirts of Baltimore City. Rouse proposed a shopping center, and the estate was demolished for development in 1955.

Mondawmin Center was built as an urban retail hub. It was an open-air complex of 58 store spaces, featuring a spiral staircase, a three-level Sears, a G.C. Murphy 5 and 10, and Food Fair and Penn Fruit supermarkets. Jim Rouse's brother Willard Goldsmith Rouse arranged the initial leasing, which included "The White Coffee Pot", a store that opened as a segregated establishment.

=== After opening ===
The center was fully enclosed during renovations that started in 1963 and its name was changed to Mondawmin Mall.

After the 1968 Baltimore riots produced white flight, the mall revenues declined and Sears left. Vacant space was occupied by the department of social services, where 35 people were held hostage in May 1977 by an unemployed man facing court action. The Rouse Company had sold the Mondawmin Mall property in the mid-1960s, only to buy it back in 1982 due to severe decline. They performed a large-scale $1.3 million renovation in 1983, sectioning the vacant Sears into smaller store spaces and adding a parking garage to the west end of the structure. The majority of the former Sears was also demolished.

With the acquisition of The Rouse Company by Chicago-based General Growth Properties, in 2004, Mondawmin Mall became a GGP holding. General Growth Properties went through bankruptcy proceedings between April 2009 and May 2010. Once criticized for not meeting the needs of the local population, it is now better serving the community following a $68 million renovation between early 2007 and late 2008. During this project, the parking garage was demolished and replaced with a Target store. Two anchors, A.J. Wright (which later became Marshalls) and Shoppers Food & Pharmacy, were added to the east end of the shopping center.

A branch of the Motor Vehicle Administration (MVA) of Maryland was on the Mondawmin property in a separate building. In 2011, the MVA moved to Hilltop Plaza Shopping Center in northwest Baltimore.

During the 2015 Baltimore riots, police protected the Mondawmin Mall for a short period of time, eventually closing in the mid afternoon. Baltimore Police sealed off the transit hub at Mondawmin, causing students from nearby schools who were trying to get home to be stranded there, creating further animosity towards the police. Images of Mondawmin Mall appeared on major news networks showing looters running into and out of the mall during the riots. The mall remained closed from Monday, April 27, 2015, until Saturday, May 2, 2015, and reopened on Sunday, May 3, 2015.

On November 7, 2017, Target announced that its Mondawmin store would close in February 2018.

Target officially closed its doors in February 2018, and the space remained vacant until 2022 when the former store began redevelopment.

In August 2018, all of GGP Inc.'s portfolio, including Mondawmin Mall, was acquired by Brookfield Properties.

The former Target store was demolished and is being replaced with a community hub called The Village at Mondawmin. Some of its tenants opened in 2025.

Brookfield Properties reverted its retail division back to the GGP brand in January 2026.

== 2026 shooting ==
Around 11:10 p.m. EST on February 16, 2026, the Baltimore Police reported that four people were shot near TGI Fridays, a restaurant at Mondawmin Mall, and a blue Ford F-150 pickup truck and a silver sedan crashed near the site. The names of the victims and the shooter are not yet identified.

On February 17, 2026, it was reported that the shooting left one dead and three injured. The police got involved following Shot-Spotter alerts at 9:30 p.m. EST. It was also found that two males were suffering from the gunshots.

It was also found out that the shooting was targeted.

== In popular culture ==
Mondawmin Mall was prominently featured in the movie Species II, 1998, starring Michael Madsen and Marg Helgenberger.

== Transportation ==
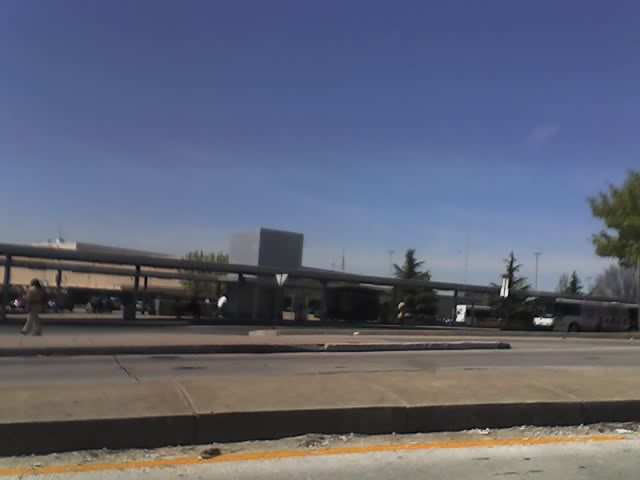
Mondawmin station

The perimeter of the Mondawmin Mall property is composed of some major Baltimore roads, including Liberty Heights Avenue, Reisterstown Road, and Gwynns Falls Parkway. Also nearby are Maryland Route 129 and Monroe Street.

Located on the Mondawmin property is the Mondawmin Transit Center, which mainly includes Mondawmin station of the Baltimore Metro Subway. This station serves as a hub for 10 Maryland Transit Administration bus lines. There are also 175 spaces in the mall's parking lot designated for use by riders of the Metro Subway.
