= List of MTA Maryland bus routes =

MTA Maryland Bus Services
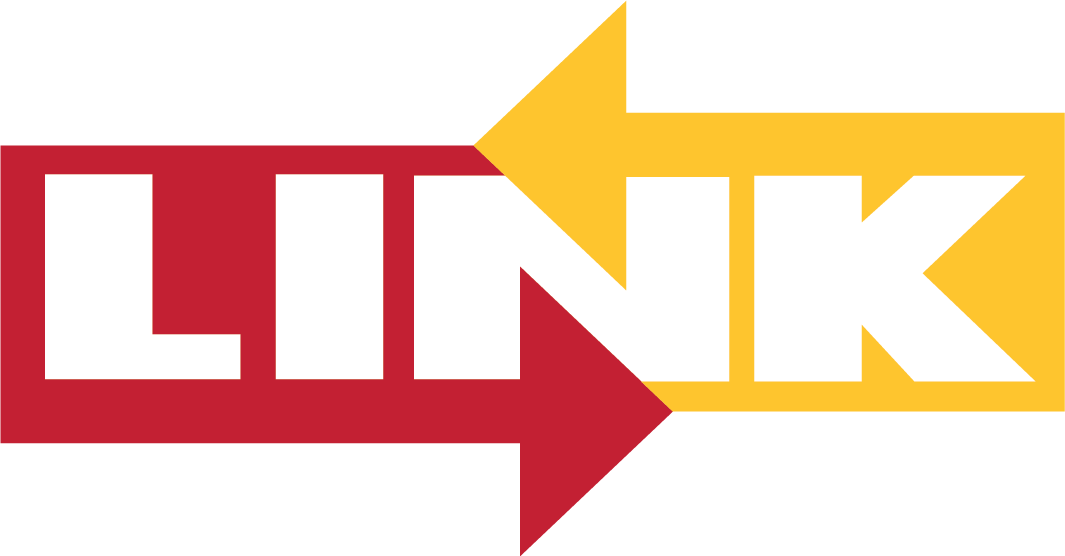

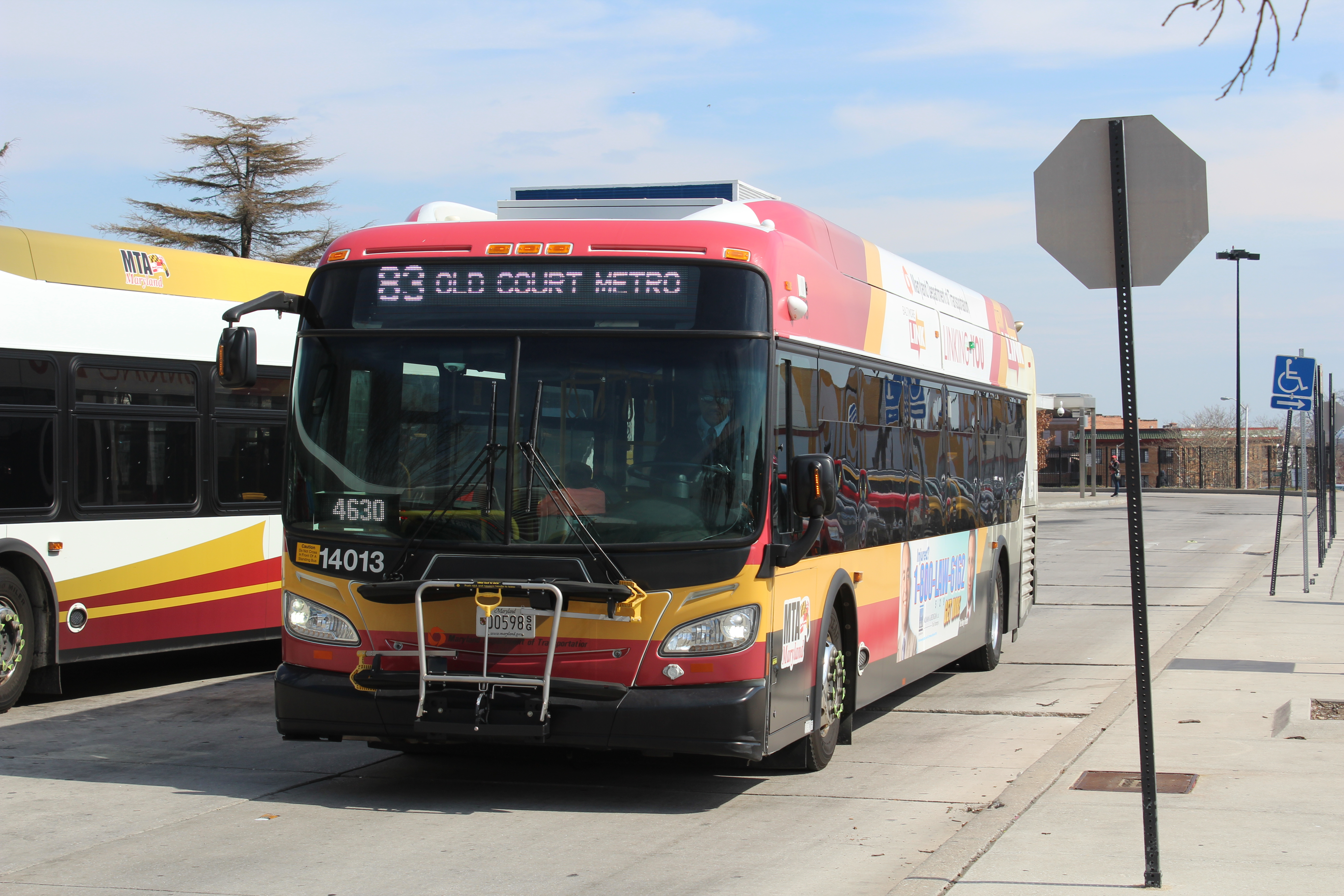
- An XDE40 on route 83 at Mondawmin station
- Parent: MTA Maryland
- Service type: LocalLink, CityLink, Express BusLink
- Routes: CityLink: 12; Express BusLink: 9 LocalLink: 44; Total: 65
- Hubs: 70+ (Baltimore area)
- Fleet: Urban bus: 774; Motor coach bus: 68; Total: 842
- Daily ridership: 173,600 (weekdays, Q2 2026)
- Annual ridership: 50,250,100 (2025)

The following is a list and description of the local, express and commuter bus routes of the Maryland Transit Administration, which serve Baltimore and the surrounding suburban areas as of June 2017 following the Baltimore Link Launch. In 2025, the system had a ridership of 50,250,100, or about 173,600 per weekday as of the second quarter of 2026.

Routes marked with an asterisk (*) run at all times (24/7/365).

Note: (Crosstown) = Bus service that is traveling across the city of Baltimore without going through the downtown area.

== CityLink ==
Route	Terminals		via	Annual ridership (2024)	Notes
CityLink Blue (BL)*	Bayview; JHBMC	Woodlawn; CMS HQ	Fayette St, Edmondson Ave, Security Blvd	2,027,817	
CityLink Blue (BL)*	Bayview; JHBMC	Westgate; Edmondson Ave & N Bend Rd (North Bend Loop)	Fayette St, Edmondson Ave	2,027,817	Overnight trips
CityLink Brown (BR)*	Downtown; University of Maryland Medical Center	Overlea; Belair Rd & Overlea Ave (Overlea Loop)	Lombard St (WB), Pratt St (EB), Broadway, Belair Rd	1,493,759	
CityLink Gold (GD)*	Canton; Clinton St & Danville Ave	Mt. Holly; North Ave & Denison St (Walbrook Junction)	Wolfe St (EB), Washington St (WB), North Ave	2,084,583	Select trips
CityLink Gold (GD)*	Berea/Broadway East; Patterson Park Ave & Lanvale St near Baltimore Cemetery	Mt. Holly; North Ave & Denison St (Walbrook Junction)	North Ave	2,084,583	
CityLink Green (GR)*	Inner Harbor; Charles St & Camden St	Towson; Towson Town Center	Charles St (NB), Saint Paul St (SB), Loch Raven Blvd	1,537,413	
CityLink Lime (LM)*	Fells Point; Caroline St & Eastern Ave	Randallstown; Brenbrook Dr & Cinnamon Cir	Caroline St, Liberty Ave/Liberty Heights Ave	1,505,252	
CityLink Lime (LM)*	Penn-North; Pennsylvania Ave & Clifton Ave	Randallstown; Brenbrook Dr & Cinnamon Cir	Liberty Ave/Liberty Heights Ave	1,505,252	Alternate and overnight trips
CityLink Navy (NV)*	Mondawmin; Mondawmin; Mondawmin Mall	Dundalk; Watersedge Park Loop	Pratt St (EB), Lombard St (WB), Eastern Ave, Dundalk Ave	2,144,661	
CityLink Navy (NV)*	Mondawmin; Mondawmin; Mondawmin Mall	Dundalk; Avondale Rd & Flora Dr (Turner Station)	Pratt St (EB), Lombard St (WB), Eastern Ave, Dundalk Ave	2,144,661	Overnight and select trips
CityLink Navy (NV)*	Mondawmin; Mondawmin; Mondawmin Mall	Bayview; JHBMC	Pratt St (EB), Lombard St (WB), Eastern Ave	2,144,661	Select trips
CityLink Orange (OR)*	Midtown-Edmondson; West Baltimore	Essex; Bayner Rd & Sandalwood Rd	Baltimore St (EB), Fayette St, Eastern Av	2,440,768	
CityLink Pink (PK)*	Midtown-Edmondson; West Baltimore	Frankford; Cedonia Ave & Bayonne Ave (Cedonia Loop)	Monument St (EB), Madison St (WB), Sinclair Ln	1,773,107	
CityLink Purple (PR)*	Downtown; Saratoga St & Lexington St	Catonsville; Rolling Rd & Baltimore National Pike	Fayette St (WB), Baltimore St, Frederick Rd, Rolling Rd	1,272,860	
CityLink Purple (PR)*	Downtown; Saratoga St & Lexington St	Catonsville; Paradise Loop	Fayette St (WB), Baltimore St, Frederick Rd	1,272,860	Alternate and overnight trips
CityLink Red (RD)*	Downtown; University of Maryland Medical Center	Timonium; Lutherville	Fayette St (SB), Baltimore St (NB), York Rd/Greenmount Ave	2,630,711	Select trips end at Greenmount & North
CityLink Red (RD)*	Downtown; University of Maryland Medical Center	Towson; Towson Town Center	Fayette St (SB), Baltimore St (NB), York Rd/Greenmount Ave	2,630,711	Select trips end at Greenmount & North
CityLink Silver (SV)*	Charles Village; Johns Hopkins University	Curtis Bay; Spruce St & Pennington St	Hanover St (NB), Charles St (NB), St Paul St/Light St (SB)	1,441,522	
CityLink Silver (SV)*	MSU; Morgan State University	Curtis Bay; Spruce St & Pennington St	33rd St, Hanover St (NB), Charles St (NB), St Paul St/Light St (SB)	1,441,522	Alternate and overnight trips
CityLink Yellow (YW)*	Downtown; Guilford Ave & Centre St	Halethorpe; Beltway Business Community Park	Guilford St, Lombard St (SB), Pratt St, Fallsway (NB), Washington Blvd	1,713,973	
CityLink Yellow (YW)*	Downtown; Guilford Ave & Centre St	Lansdowne; Patapsco	Guilford St, Lombard St (SB), Pratt St, Fallsway (NB), Washington Blvd, Hollins Ferry Rd	1,713,973	Alternate and overnight trips

== Express BusLink ==
Route	Terminals		via	Annual ridership (2024)	Notes
103	Downtown; Charles St & Hyatt St	Towson; Cromwell Bridge P&R	St. Paul St (SB), Charles St (NB), Loch Raven Blvd	47,310	Weekday peak direction only
105	Downtown; Lexington Market	Frankford; Cedonia Ave & Bayonne Ave (Cedonia Loop)	Madison St, Fayette St (WB), Baltimore St, Monument St (EB), Edison Hwy, Sinclair Ln	56,284	Weekday peak direction only
115	Downtown; Lexington Market	Perry Hall; Perry Hall Blvd & Haylock St	Belair Rd	53,768	Weekday rush hours only Reverse peak trips run to/from Berea
115	Berea/Broadway East; Belair Rd & North Ave	Perry Hall; Perry Hall Blvd & Haylock St	Belair Rd	53,768	Weekday rush hours only Reverse peak trips run to/from Berea
120	Downtown; Wolfe St & McElderry St	White Marsh; White Marsh P&R	Madison St (EB), Monument St (WB), I-395, John. F Kennedy Mem'l Hwy	46,139	Weekday rush hours only
150	Fells Point; Caroline St & Eastern Ave	Harpers Choice; Harpers Farm Rd & Cedar Ln	Baltimore St (EB), Fayette St (WB), Franklin-Mulberry Expy, Baltimore National Pike, Columbia Pike	29,308	Weekday rush hours only
154	Downtown; State Center; Cultural Center	Towson; Goucher Blvd & Colbury Rd	Eutaw St, Harford Rd	86,323	Weekday rush hours only
154	Downtown; State Center; Cultural Center	Carney; Carney P&R	Eutaw St, Harford Rd	86,323	Weekday rush hours only
160	Downtown; Wolfe St & McElderry St	Essex; Bayner Rd & Sandalwood Rd	Fayette St, I-95, Eastern Ave, Back River Neck Rd	23,252	Weekday rush hours only Trips alternate between each terminal
160	Downtown; Wolfe St & McElderry St	Chase/Whispering Woods; Eastern Ave & Tidewater Ln	Fayette St, I-95, Eastern Ave, Bowleys Quarters	23,252	Weekday rush hours only Trips alternate between each terminal
163	Midtown-Edmondson; West Baltimore	Sparrows Point; Tradepoint Atlantic	Franklin-Mulberry Expy, I-95, Broening Hwy, Peninsula Expy	741,457	

=== Former Express BusLink Routes ===
- Express Bus Link 102: White Marsh Park and Ride to Towson
- Express Bus Link 104: Cromwell Bridge Park & Ride to Harbor East
- Express Bus Link 106: Owings Mills Metro to Towson
- Express Bus Link 107: Old Court Station to BWI Marshal Airport / BWI Business Park

== LocalLink ==
Route	Terminals		via	Annual ridership (2024)	Notes
21	Woodberry; Woodberry	Canton; Clinton St & Danville Ave	25th St, Wolfe St (SB), Washington St (NB), East Ave	421,904	Less frequent on weekdays than weekends
22	Mondawmin; Mondawmin; Mondawmin Mall	Bayview; JHBMC	Druid Park Dr, 40th St/41st St, University Pkwy, 33rd St, Edison Hwy	2,035,858	
26	Mondawmin; Mondawmin; Mondawmin Mall	Lansdowne; Patapsco	Bentalou St, Pulaski St, Cherry Hill Rd	1,281,678	
28	Frankford; Moravia Rd & Aberdeen Ave (Moravia Loop)	Woodmere; Rogers Avenue	Moravia Rd/Cold Spring Ln	856,992	
29	Mondawmin; Mondawmin; Mondawmin Mall	Brooklyn/Brooklyn Homes; 10th St & Mayadon/Deck Cts	Hilton St/Caton Av, Patapsco Av	972,835	
30	Woodmere; Rogers Avenue	Hollander Ridge; 62nd St & Pulaski Hwy	Northern Pkwy, Belvedere Ave/Echodale Ave/Frankford Ave	1,179,934	
31	Levindale; Cylburn Ave & Greenspring Ave (Sinai Hospital)	Woodlawn; CMS HQ	Woodlawn Dr, Rogers Ave, Belvedere Ave	525,794	Early morning trips
31	Levindale; Cylburn Ave & Greenspring Ave (Sinai Hospital)	Woodlawn; Security Square Mall	Woodlawn Dr, Rogers Ave, Belvedere Ave	525,794	
31	Levindale; Cylburn Ave & Greenspring Ave (Sinai Hospital)	Woodlawn; Social Security West Building	Woodlawn Dr, Rogers Ave, Belvedere Ave	525,794	Alternate rush hour trips
32	Lansdowne; Patapsco	Catonsville; Rolling Rd & Baltimore National Pike	Lansdowne Rd, Washington Blvd, Bloomsbury Ave/Ingleside Ave, Rolling Rd	127,987	Created in 2022 from former branch of CityLink Yellow Line
33	White Marsh; White Marsh P&R	Mount Washington; Kelly Ave & Sulgrave Ave near Mt. Washington	Northern Pkwy, Belair Rd	312,215	
34	Catonsville; Rolling Rd & Baltimore National Pike	Towson; Falls Road	Ingleside Ave/Forest Park Ave, Smith Ave, Falls Rd	256,510	
34	Catonsville; Rolling Rd & Baltimore National Pike	Brooklandville; Greenspring Station	Ingleside Ave/Forest Park Ave, Smith Ave, Falls Rd	256,510	Select weekday rush hour trips
36	Towson; Towson Town Center	Essex; Bayner Rd & Sandalwood Rd	Northern Pkwy, Kenwood Ave, Rossville Blvd/Stemmers Run Rd/Back River Neck Rd	634,422	
37	Catonsville; UMBC	Lochearn; Old Court	Bloomsbury Ave/Ingleside Ave, Rolling Rd, Old Court Rd	561,843	
37	Catonsville; Rolling Rd & Baltimore National Pike	Lochearn; Old Court	Baltimore National Pike, Rolling Rd, Old Court Rd	561,843	Alternate trips
38	Westgate; Edmondson Ave & N Bend Rd (North Bend Loop)	Cross Keys; Poly Western High School	Edmondson Ave, Liberty Heights Ave, Greenspring Rd	26,629	No service when school isn't in session
40	Woodlawn; CMS HQ	Essex; Bayner Rd & Sandalwood Rd	Security Blvd, Edmondson Ave, Franklin-Mulberry Expy, Baltimore St (EB), Fayette St, Eastern Ave	368,352	Quickline: Makes limited stops
51	Towson; Towson Town Center	Inner Harbor; Hopkins Pl & Pratt St	Bellona Ave, Charles St, Maryland Ave/Cathedral St/Liberty St	304,758	
52	East Baltimore Midway; Kirk Ave & Bartlett St	Timonium; Stella Maris Hospice	York Rd, Dulaney Valley Rd	62,325	
53	Downtown; State Center	Towson; Cromwell Bridge P&R	Kirk Ave, The Alameda, Loch Raven Blvd	950,181	Trips alternate between each branch
53	Downtown; State Center	Towson; Sheppard Pratt at Towson	Kirk Ave, The Alameda, Loch Raven Blvd	950,181	Trips alternate between each branch
54*	Downtown; State Center; Cultural Center	Towson; Goucher Blvd & Colbury Rd	Eutaw St, Harford Rd	1,688,168	Trips alternate between each branch
54*	Downtown; State Center; Cultural Center	Carney; Carney P&R	Eutaw St, Harford Rd	1,688,168	Trips alternate between each branch
56	Downtown; Fayette St & Hanover St	White Marsh; White Marsh P&R	Madison St (WB), Monument St (EB), Philadelphia Rd	1,258,269	
57	Belair-Edison; Erdman Ave & Belair Rd			86,578	Peak service operates in a small loop serving Belair-Edison and Parkside; Off-peak service, operates in a larger loop additionally serving Erdman Shopping Center and Parkside Shopping Center
59	Frankford; Moravia Park Dr & Frankford Ave	Chase/Whispering Woods; Eastern Ave & Tidewater Ln	Eastern Ave	318,731	
62	Rossville; CCBC Essex	Dundalk; Avondale Rd & Flora Dr (Turner Station)	Eastern Ave, North Point Rd, Wise Ave/Holabird Ave	630,977	
63	Waltherson; Gardenville P&R	Sparrows Point; Tradepoint Atlantic	Sinclair Ln, Dundalk Ave, Peninsula Expy	426,330	
65	Downtown; Fayette St & Hanover St	Dundalk; CCBC Dundalk	Lombard St (WB), Pratt St (EB), Broening Hwy	296,670	
67	Downtown; Saratoga St & Lexington St	Marley Neck; Energy Pkwy & Perryman Ct	Baltimore St (NB), Fayette St (SB), Charles St (NB), Light St (SB), Curtis Ave (NB), Pennington Ave/Hawkins Point Rd/Fort Smallwood Rd	186,701	
69	Lansdowne; Patapsco	Pasadena; Jumpers Hole Loop & Woodholme Cir	Governor Ritchie Hwy, Crain Hwy, Baltimore-Annapolis Blvd	325,516	
69	Downtown; University of Maryland Medical Center	Pasadena; Jumpers Hole Loop & Woodholme Cir	Governor Ritchie Hwy, Crain Hwy, Baltimore-Annapolis Blvd	325,516	Operates when LightRail Link isn't running
70	Lansdowne; Patapsco	Annapolis; Calvert St & Bladen St	Governor Ritchie Hwy, Crain Hwy, Baltimore-Annapolis Blvd	401,961	
70	Downtown; University of Maryland Medical Center	Annapolis; Calvert St & Bladen St	Governor Ritchie Hwy, Crain Hwy, Baltimore-Annapolis Blvd	401,961	Operates when LightRail Link isn't running
71	Downtown; Saratoga St & Greene St	Lansdowne; Patapsco	Key Hwy, Cherry Hill Rd, Annapolis Rd	388,247	
73	Downtown; State Center	Wagner's Point; Wagners Point	Hollins Ferry Rd, Annapolis Rd, Patapsco Ave	370,211	
75*	Lansdowne; Patapsco	Hanover/Severn; Arundel Mills	Nursery Rd, Elkridge Landing Rd, Aviation Blvd	358,070	
75*	Downtown; University of Maryland Medical Center	Hanover/Severn; Arundel Mills	Baltimore-Washington Pkwy, Elkridge Landing Rd, Aviation Blvd	358,070	Operates when LightRail Link isn't running
76	Downtown; Saratoga St & Lexington St	Catonsville; Southwest P&R	Lombard St (WB), Pratt St (EB), Wilkens Ave	618,231	Select weekday trips serve Crossroade Business Park
77	Midtown-Edmondson; West Baltimore	Catonsville; Rolling Rd & Baltimore National Pike	Edmondson Ave	365,594	
78	Downtown; Gay St & Lexington St	Woodlawn; CMS HQ	Fayette St (WB), Baltimore St	1,053,772	
79	Mondawmin; Mondawmin; Mondawmin Mall	Woodlawn; CMS HQ	Security Blvd	335,430	
80*	Downtown; Saratoga St & Lexington St	Woodmere; Rogers Avenue	Saratoga St, Edmondson Ave, Garrison Blvd	1,324,683	
81	Lochearn; Milford Mill	Randallstown; Randallstown Loop	Milford Mill Rd, Liberty Rd	348,473	Early morning and late night trips
81	Lochearn; Milford Mill	Randallstown; Deer Park Rd & Liberty Rd	Milford Mill Rd, Liberty Rd	348,473	
82	Reisterstown Station; Reisterstown Plaza	Park Circle; Monte Verde Apartments	Dolfield Ave, Hilton St	297,964	
83	Mondawmin; Mondawmin; Mondawmin Mall	Lochearn; Old Court	Reisterstown Rd	768,434	
85	Reservoir Hill/Bolton Hill; North Avenue	Lochearn; Milford Mill	Park Heights Ave	1,275,309	
87	Owings Mills; Owings Mills	Reisterstown; Glyndon Loop	Reisterstown Rd	416,535	
89	Woodmere; Rogers Avenue	Owings Mills; Owings Mills	Reisterstown Rd	407,914	
89	Woodmere; Rogers Avenue	Owings Mills; Redland Court	Reisterstown Rd	407,914	No off-peak service
91	Levindale; Belvedere Ave & Lanier Ave (Sinai Hospital)	Downtown; University of Maryland Medical Center	Guilford St, Lombard St (SB), Pratt St, Fallsway (NB), Greenspring Ave	155,511	
91	Levindale; Belvedere Ave & Lanier Ave (Sinai Hospital)	Mondawmin; Mondawmin; Mondawmin Mall	Greenspring Ave	155,511	Alternate trips
92	Glen; Glen Ave & Key Ave	Pikesville; Bais Yaakov Intermediate School	Smith Ave	41,008	Select weekday trips
92	Glen; Glen Ave & Key Ave	Owings Mills; Bais Yaakov Elementary School	Smith Ave, Park Heights Ave	41,008	Select weekday trips
92	Glen; Glen Ave & Key Ave	Owings Mills; Owings Mills Center	Smith Ave, Reisterstown Rd	41,008	Select trips
92	Glen; Glen Ave & Key Ave	Lochearn; Talmudical Academy of Baltimore	Smith Ave, Old Court Rd	41,008	Select trips
93	Towson; Towson Town Center	Hunt Valley; International Cir & International Dr near Hunt Valley	York Rd, Greenspring Dr/Beaver Dam Rd/McCormick Rd	294,847	
94	Levindale; Belvedere Ave & Lanier Ave (Sinai Hospital)	Locust Point; Fort McHenry	Falls Rd, Howard St	407,233	
95	Inner Harbor; Charles St & Pratt St	New North Roland Park/Poplar Hill; Roland Ave & Bellemore Ave	Charles/Pratt Sts, Roland Ave	101,366	No off-peak service

== MTA Commuter BUSLink ==
The following is a listing of all services operating under the MTA's Commuter BUSLink network, including services operating to Baltimore and Washington, D.C.

=== Intercounty Connector Bus routes ===
Route	Terminals		Corridors served	Places Served	Total trips	Operated by	Other notes
Route	Northbound or Westbound	Southbound or Eastbound	Corridors served	Places Served	Total trips	Operated by	Other notes
201	Gaithersburg	BWI Airport	I-95, I-195, ICC	Shady Grove; Norbeck	Mon-Fri 10 to BWI; 12 to Gaithersburg; Sat-Sun 11 to BWI, 11 to Gaithersburg	Dillon's Bus Service	Only Commuter Bus route to operate every day, with midday and off-peak service.; Selected trips daily extended to Baltimore Greyhound Station.
203	Columbia	Bethesda	US-29, ICC	Snowden River P&R; Mall in Columbia; Scaggsville P&R; Burtonsville P&R; Georgia Ave P&R; Medical Center	3 AM to Bethesda; 3 PM to Columbia	Dillon's Bus Service	
204	Frederick	College Park	I-270, ICC	Urbana P&R; Monocacy; Gaithersburg; Georgia Ave P&R; FDA; UMD College Park; College Park	3 AM to College Park; 3 PM to Frederick	Atlantic Coast Charters	

=== Commuter BUSLink to Baltimore ===
==== To/From Anne Arundel County ====
Route	Terminals		Corridors served	Places Served	Total trips	Operated by	Other notes
210	Downtown Baltimore/Johns Hopkins Hospital	Kent Island	I-97; US-50	Annapolis	3 AM to Baltimore; 3 PM to Annapolis	Academy Bus Lines	
215	Downtown Baltimore/Johns Hopkins Hospital	Annapolis	I-97; US-50		3 AM to Annapolis; 3 PM to Baltimore	Academy Bus Lines	

==== To/From Howard County ====
Route	Terminals		Corridors served	Places Served	Total trips	Operated by	Other notes
310	Downtown Baltimore	Columbia	I-95	Mall in Columbia; Village of Oakland Mills; Village of Long Reach	4 AM to Baltimore; 5 PM to Columbia	Dillon's Bus Service	
320	Downtown Baltimore	Laurel	US-1	Columbia; Elkridge; Jessup	4 AM to Columbia; 5 PM to Baltimore	Dillon's Bus Service	

==== To/from Harford County ====
Route	Terminals		Corridors served	Places served	Total trips	Operated by	Other notes
410	Downtown Baltimore	Churchville/Bel Air	MD-22, MD-924	Abingdon	4 AM to Baltimore; 4 PM to Bel Air	Academy Bus Lines	
411	Downtown Baltimore/Johns Hopkins Hospital	Hickory/Bel Air	Belair Road, MD-147, MD-152	Fallston	4 AM to Baltimore; 4 PM to Bel Air	Academy Bus Lines	
411T	White Marsh Mall	Trade Point Atlantic	I-695	Golden Ring; Essex Park and Ride		Academy Bus Lines	Started service on August 31, 2026.
420	Downtown Baltimore	Havre de Grace	US-40, MD-7	Aberdeen; Edgewood	4 AM to Baltimore; 4 PM to Havre de Grace (a 5th afternoon trip operates Fridays only)	Academy Bus Lines	

=== Commuter BUSLink to Washington, D.C. ===
==== To/From Anne Arundel County/Queen Anne's County ====
Route	Terminals		Corridors served	Places served	Total trips	Operated by	Other notes
220	Annapolis	Washington	MD-450	Harry S Truman Park & Ride	7 AM; 7 PM	Dillon's Bus Service	
230	Severna Park	Washington	US 50	Harry S Truman Park & Ride	6 AM (3 from Severna Park, 3 from Annapolis); 8 PM (3 direct to Severna Park, 3 direct to Annapolis, 2 to Severna Park via Annapolis)	Dillon's Bus Service	
230	Annapolis	Washington	MD-450	Harry S Truman Park & Ride	6 AM (3 from Severna Park, 3 from Annapolis); 8 PM (3 direct to Severna Park, 3 direct to Annapolis, 2 to Severna Park via Annapolis)	Dillon's Bus Service	
240	Kent Narrows	Washington	US 50	Stevensville Park & Ride	3 AM; 4 PM	Dillon's Bus Service	
250	Kent Narrows	Washington	US 50	Stevensville Park & Ride; Davidsonville Park & Ride	6 AM; 6 PM	Dillon's Bus Service	
260	Severna Park	Washington	US 50	Davidsonville Park & Ride	3 AM; 4 PM	Dillon's Bus Service	

==== To/From Howard County ====
Route	Terminals		Corridors served	Places Served	Total trips	Operated by	Other notes
305	Columbia	Silver Spring/Washington	US-29	Mall in Columbia; Oakland Mills; Owen Brown; Scaggsville; Burtonsville	4 AM; 6 PM	Martz Group	
315	Columbia	Silver Spring/Washington	MD-175	Scaggsville; Burtonsville	4 AM; 6 PM	Martz Group	
325	Columbia	Silver Spring/Washington	MD-175	Harper's Choice; Wilde Lake	4 AM; 6 PM	Martz Group	
335	Clarksville	Washington	I-95		4 AM; 4 PM	Dillon's Bus Service	
345	Ellicott City	Washington	I-95	Long Reach	4 AM; 5 PM	Dillon's Bus Service	

==== To/from Washington and Frederick Counties ====
Route	Terminals		Corridors served	Places served	Total trips	Operated by	Other notes
505	Hagerstown	Shady Grove	I-70, I-270	Myersville	4 AM trips to Shady Grove Metro; 6 PM trips to Hagerstown	Atlantic Coast Charters	Selected trips extended to Rock Spring Business Park
515	Frederick	Shady Grove	I-270	Monocacy; Urbana	6 AM trips to Shady Grove (4 from North Frederick, 2 from Frederick MARC); 6 PM trips to Frederick (4 to North Frederick, 2 to Frederick MARC)	Eyre Bus Service	Selected trips extended to Rock Spring Business Park

=== Charles County to Washington, DC ===
Route	Terminals		Corridors served	Places Served	Total trips	Operated by	Other notes
610	Waldorf	Washington	US-301; MD-210; MD-228	Oxon Hill; National Harbor	11 AM; 11 PM	Academy Express	5 AM and 5 PM trips via Oxon Hill and National Harbor
620	Waldorf	Washington	US-301; MD-210; MD-228	St. Charles Towne Center	11 AM; 11 PM	Academy Express	5 AM and 5 PM trips via Oxon Hill and National Harbor
630	La Plata	Washington	US-301; MD-210; MD-228	St. Charles Towne Center	5 AM; 5 PM	Martz Gold Line	
640	Waldorf/Accokeek Park & Ride	Washington	MD-210	Regency Furniture Stadium; Accokeek Park & Ride	6 AM; 6 PM	Dillon's Bus Service	
650	La Plata	Washington	MD-210	Accokeek Park & Ride	7 AM; 7 PM	Keller Transportation	

=== St. Mary's County to Washington, DC ===
Route	Terminals		Corridors served	Places Served	Total trips	Operated by	Other notes
705	Charlotte Hall/Waldorf	Washington	MD-5	Mattawoman-Beantown P&R	9 AM; 8 PM	Academy Express	
715	Charlotte Hall/Waldorf	Washington	MD-5	Golden Beach P&R; Mattawoman-Beantown P&R	6 AM; 8 PM	Keller Transportation	
725	California	Washington	MD-5; MD-235	Charlotte Hall	3 AM; 3 PM	Keller Transportation	
735	Charlotte Hall	Washington	MD-5	Waldorf; Suitland	5 AM; 5 PM	Martz Gold Line	

=== Calvert County to Washington, DC ===
Route	Terminals		Corridors served	Places Served	Total trips	Operated by	Other notes
810	Pindell	Washington	MD-4	Waysons Corner	3 AM; 3 PM	Eyre Bus Service	
820	North Beach	Washington	MD-4; MD-280	Upper Marlboro (Prince George's Equestrian Center)	7 AM; 8 PM	Academy Express	
830	Huntingtown (Chesapeake Church)	Washington	MD-4	Dunkirk	7 AM; 7 PM	Keller Transportation	
840	St. Leonard	Washington	MD-4	Prince Frederick	5 AM; 6 PM	Keller Transportation	
850	Prince Frederick	Washington	MD-4	Dunkirk	3 AM; 3 PM	Keller Transportation	

== Former bus routes ==
See History of MTA Maryland#Former bus routes
