= Cultural Center Station =

Cultural Center Station may refer to:

- Cultural Center metro station, a Kaohsiung MRT station, Taiwan
- Cultural Center station, a Baltimore Light RailLink station, Maryland, U.S.
- State Center / Cultural Center station, an underground Baltimore Metro SubwayLink station, Maryland, U.S.
- Cultural Centre busway station, a bus station in Brisbane, Australia

== See also ==
- Thailand Cultural Centre MRT station, Bangkok
- Wenhuazhongxin station (文化中心站, literally Cultural Center station), a metro station of Line 5, Line 6, Line 11 and Line Z1 of the Tianjin Metro
