= Eyre Bus Service =

Provides bus and tour services in the US

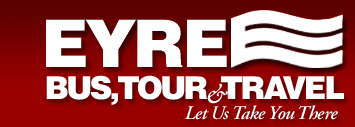

- An Eyre bus operating as MTA Route 991
- Founded: 1947
- Headquarters: 13600 Triadelphia Road, Glenelg, Maryland 21737
- Service area: Maryland, District of Columbia, Northern Virginia
- Service type: Intercity coach service
- Destinations: School trips, Beaches, Casinos, & Charter
- Fleet: 50 coaches
- Chief executive: Ronald L. Eyre, CEO and Chairman
- Website: eyre.com

Eyre Bus Service and Eyre Tour & Travel, Ltd. provides bus and tour services in the United States Mid-Atlantic states from its base in central Maryland. It is also a contract operator for commuter transit in Hagerstown, Maryland, and Frederick, Maryland.

The company's CEO and Chairman is Ronald L. Eyre, and its President is Matt Eyre. As of December 2015, it had a fleet of 50 buses, and operated five contract routes for MTA Maryland: MTA Routes 202, 203, 204, and 205 operating on the Intercounty Connector, and Route 515 operating from Frederick, Maryland to Shady Grove Metro Station.
