= East Broadway =

East Broadway may refer to:

- East Broadway (Manhattan), street in the Chinatown/Lower East Side neighborhood of the New York City borough of Manhattan
  - East Broadway (IND Sixth Avenue Line), station on the IND Sixth Avenue Line of the New York City Subway
- Broadway East, Baltimore, neighborhood in the Eastern district of Baltimore, Maryland
