= Mt. Royal/MICA station =

Light rail station in Baltimore, Maryland, US

Mt. Royal/MICA
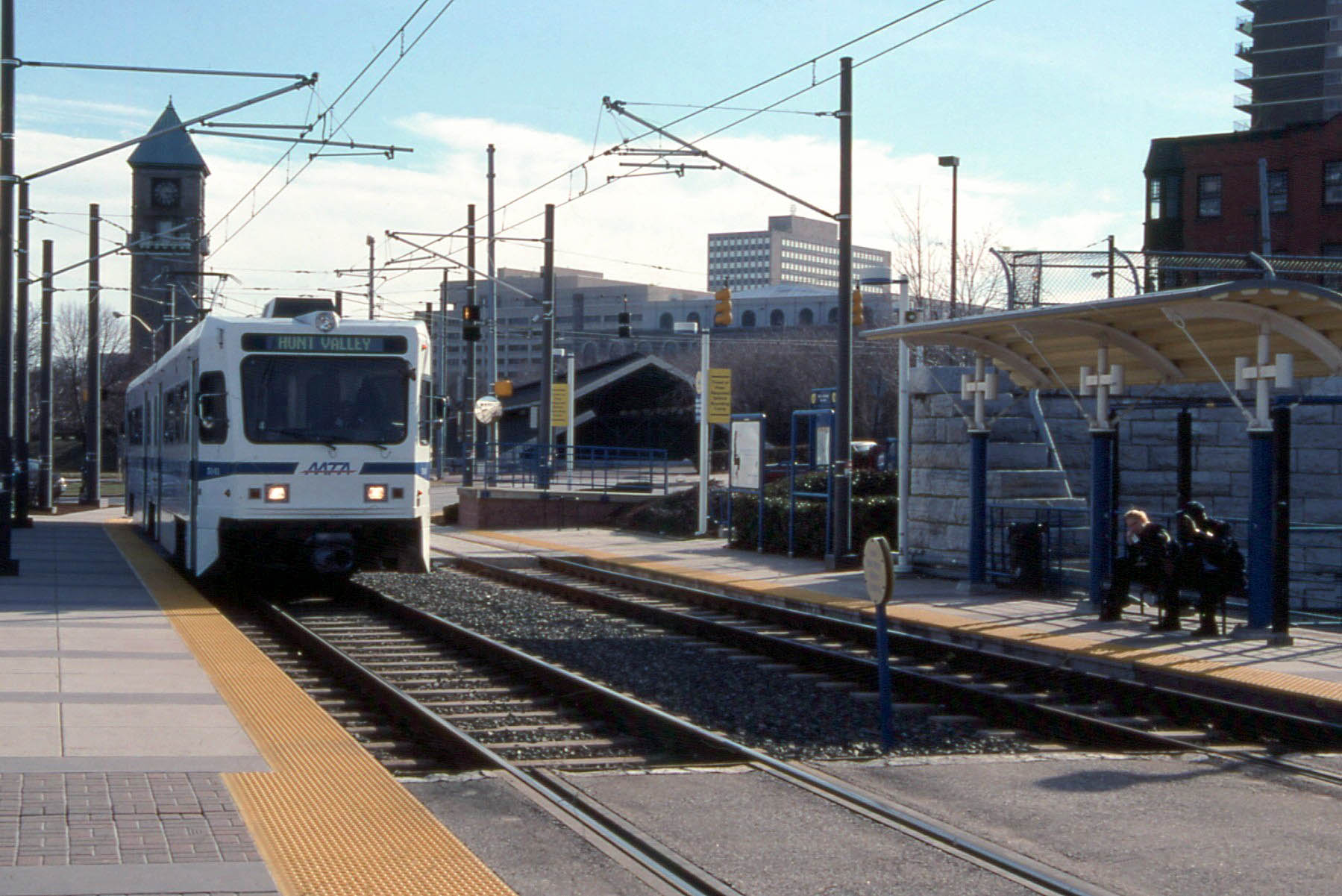
- A train at the station in March 2000

General information
- Location: 1223 West Mount Royal Avenue; Baltimore, Maryland
- Coordinates: 39°18′26.6″N 76°37′11.6″W
- Owner: Maryland Transit Administration
- Platforms: 2 side platforms
- Tracks: 2
- Connections: 27

Construction
- Parking: Street
- Cycle facilities: Bike Share Stop #35 (16 docks)
- Accessible: Yes

History
- Opened: April 2, 1992
- Former names: University of Baltimore/Mt. Royal (1992–2017)

Passengers
- 2017: 703 daily

Services
Preceding station	Maryland Transit Administration	Following station
Cultural Center toward BWI Airport or Glen Burnie	Light RailLink	North Avenue toward Hunt Valley
Cultural Center toward Camden Yards	Light RailLink Penn–Camden Shuttle	Penn Station Terminus
Location

Mt. Royal/MICA station (formerly University of Baltimore/Mt. Royal station) is a Baltimore Light RailLink station in Baltimore, Maryland. It is on the northwest edge of the University of Baltimore campus and on the southern edge of the MICA campus, across Mount Royal Avenue from the site of Baltimore & Ohio Railroad's former Mount Royal Station. It opened in 1992 as part of the line's initial operating segment. The station's construction was funded by the University of Baltimore for the use of its students after the State of Maryland proposed its elimination from the plan to reduce costs.
