= Martz Group =

Pennsylvania based bus company

MARTZ Group

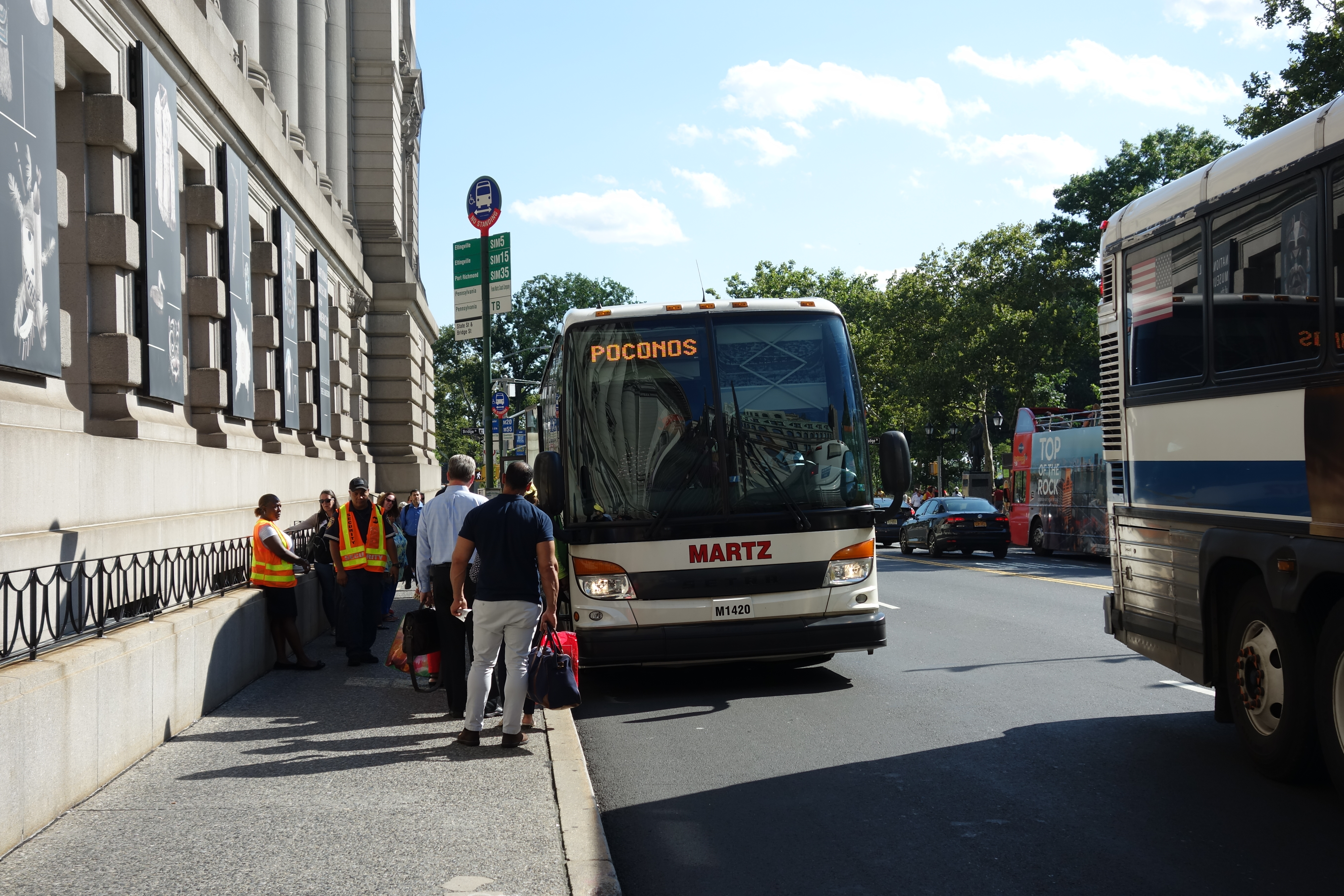
- A Martz Trailways motorcoach bound for the Poconos picks up passengers in the Financial District in Lower Manhattan
- Founded: 1908
- Headquarters: Wilkes-Barre, Pennsylvania, U.S.
- Service area: Florida, Maryland, New Jersey, New York, Pennsylvania, Virginia, Washington, D.C.
- Service type: Intercity bus, charter bus, tours
- Alliance: Trailways Transportation System
- Website: martzgroup.com

Martz Group is a bus company headquartered in Wilkes-Barre, Pennsylvania, operating intercity commuter buses, charter buses, and tours. Martz is part of the Trailways Transportation System, a network of about 70 independent bus companies. Martz Group operates Martz Trailways, which provides intercity commuter bus service from the Wyoming Valley cities of Wilkes-Barre and Scranton and the Pocono Mountains in Northeastern Pennsylvania to New York City and Philadelphia. In Washington, D.C., Martz Group operates the Gold Line commuter service and Gray Line sightseeing service. Martz operates the National Coach Works in Virginia, and the First Class Coach Company Trailways serving Tampa and St. Petersburg in Florida. Martz Bus operates two Amtrak Thruway Connecting Service lines in Florida and Pennsylvania. Martz Group also offers interstate and intrastate charter bus services.

The company was founded in 1908 by Frank Martz Sr. (1885–1936) as the White Transit Company, originally operating local buses in Luzerne County, Pennsylvania. He founded the Frank Martz Coach Company in 1922 to provide intercity bus service. Martz helped establish the Trailways Transportation System, which formed a national bus system through alliances between multiple carriers. Ownership of the company remains within the Martz family, with Scott Henry of the fourth generation serving as president of Martz Group.

== Passenger service ==
=== Pennsylvania ===
Martz Trailways operates intercity bus service that connects the Wyoming Valley cities of Wilkes-Barre and Scranton and the Pocono Mountains in northeastern Pennsylvania to the Northeast megalopolis cities of New York City and Philadelphia along with casino runs to Atlantic City, New Jersey, and Wind Creek Bethlehem.

Martz Trailways operates commuter bus service from Wilkes-Barre, Scranton, and the Pocono Mountains to New York City, with frequent service on weekdays and less frequent service on weekends. In the Wyoming Valley, the commuter buses to New York City serve Scranton, and in Wilkes-Barre: downtown Wilkes-Barre at the James F. Conahan Intermodal Transportation Center, and the Wyoming Valley Mall. Places in the Pocono Mountains served by Martz buses to include Mt. Pocono, Marshalls Creek, Stroudsburg, and Delaware Water Gap. Some runs to New York City serve Panther Valley, New Jersey. Most buses operating to New York City terminate at the Port Authority Bus Terminal in Midtown Manhattan, with some runs providing service to Wall Street in Lower Manhattan.

Martz Trailways also operates Amtrak Thruway Connecting Service (an Amtrak service that link towns that are not yet served with Amtrak rail service to nearby Amtrak rail stations) providing daily service from Wilkes-Barre, Scranton, White Haven, Allentown, and Quakertown to Philadelphia's 30th Street Station, where passengers can connect to SEPTA and Amtrak trains. Martz Trailways's intercity commuter bus service offers one-way and round-trip fares along with commuter fares for frequent commuters.

Martz Trailways also operates bus service connecting the Port Authority Bus Terminal in New York City to indoor water parks in the Pocono Mountains including Great Wolf Lodge, Kalahari Resort, and Aquatopia.

Martz Trailways operates limited bus service from Wilkes-Barre, Scranton, and the Pocono Mountains to the Atlantic City casinos and Wind Creek Bethlehem. The buses to Atlantic City provide daily service from Downtown Wilkes-Barre, the Wyoming Valley Mall, and Scranton. In Atlantic City, the buses stop at Tropicana Casino & Resort Atlantic City, Resorts Casino Hotel, and Caesars Atlantic City. The buses to Wind Creek Bethlehem provide service on Thursdays and the last Sunday of the month from Downtown Wilkes-Barre, the Wyoming Valley Mall, Scranton, and Mt. Pocono.

=== Washington, D.C., and Maryland ===
Martz Group operates the Gold Line commuter service: five routes under contract with the Maryland Transit Administration that connect Washington, D.C., to suburban areas in Maryland. Route 202 provides service from Gaithersburg to Fort Meade, Route 610 connects Waldorf to Washington, D.C., Route 620 connects Waldorf and St. Charles Towne Center to Washington, D.C., Route 650 connects La Plata, Waldorf, and Accokeek to Washington, D.C., and Route 810 connects Anne Arundel County to Washington, D.C.

It also runs the Gray Line sightseeing service.

=== Virginia ===
Martz Group operates the National Coach Works serving Fredericksburg. Up until April 2021, National Coach Works provided commuter bus service from the Fredericksburg area to Washington, D.C. The National Coach Works also operates two commuter routes under contract with the Maryland Transit Administration that connect Southern Maryland with Washington, D.C., Route 705 connects the Charlotte Hall Shopping Center in Charlotte Hall and the Mattawoman-Beantown park and ride in Waldorf with Washington, D.C., and the Route 715 connects the Golden Beach park and ride in Charlotte Hall and the Mattawoman-Beantown park and ride in Waldorf with Washington, D.C. There is also charter bus service offered by the National Coach Works, serving Fredericksburg, Richmond, and Washington, D.C.

=== Florida ===
Martz Group operates the First Class Coach Company Trailways serving Tampa and St. Petersburg.

=== Partnerships ===
Martz operates services for OurBus. It operates the Amtrak Thruway route from Philadelphia's 30th Street Station to Wilkes Barre / Scranton via Allentown. It also operates the Amtrak Thruway route from the Orlando and Tampa Amtrak stations to St. Petersburg and Fort Myers.

== Charters and tours ==
Martz Trailways provides charter bus services, excursions, retail packages, custom packages, and Broadway ticket sales. Martz Tours offers entertainment tours, with single-day and multi-day trips to places across the United States. First Class Trailways offers charter bus service.

== History ==
The origins of the company date back to 1908, when Frank Martz Sr. founded the White Transit Company in Plymouth, Pennsylvania, operating between mining towns in the Coal Region. In 1912, Martz Sr. started local routes in the Luzerne County area, which were sold to the Luzerne County Transportation Authority in 1974. Martz Sr. founded the Frank Martz Coach Company in 1922 to offer intercity bus service. By 1927, the Frank Martz Coach Company had routes operating from Wilkes-Barre to New York City, Philadelphia, Albany, New York, Syracuse, New York, Buffalo, New York, Cleveland, Detroit, and Chicago. In 1926, Martz Sr. began airline service between New York City, Elmira, New York, and Buffalo. The airline service was discontinued in 1933 due to the Great Depression. Martz Sr. was one of the founders of the National Trailways Bus System, which formed a national bus system through alliances between multiple carriers, competing with Greyhound Lines for national bus service.

Martz Sr. died in 1936 and his son Frank Martz Jr. took over the company. The company continued to grow in the following years. Martz Jr. was killed in a helicopter accident in 1964, and ownership of the company passed to Frank M. Henry, the grandson of company founder Martz Sr. Ownership of the company remains within the family, with Scott Henry of the fourth generation currently President of Martz Group. In 2016, Martz Group went through a rebranding, in which they added 116 coaches, new operations in Washington, D.C., Virginia, and Florida, and the introduction of Martz Luxury Service. The company also upgraded buses.
