= Mid-Town Belvedere, Baltimore =

Mid-Town Belvedere
- Neighborhood of Baltimore
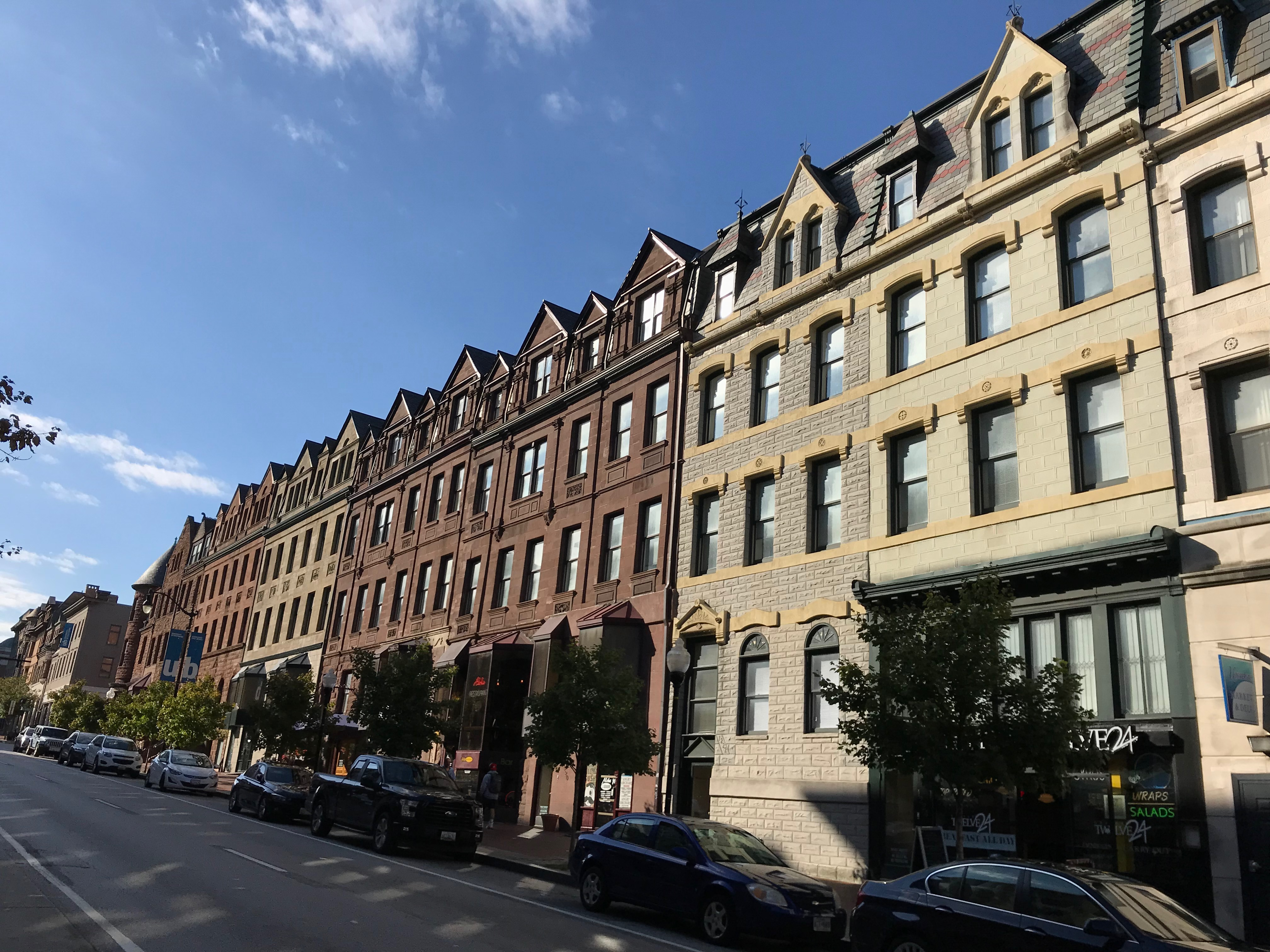
- Rowhouses and commercial buildings in Mid-Town Belvedere, Baltimore

- Location within Baltimore Location within Maryland Location within the United States
- Coordinates: 39.3044°N 76.6161°W
- Country: United States
- State: Maryland
- City: Baltimore

Area
  - Total: 0.2212 sq mi (0.573 km^{2})

Population (2010)
  - Total: 3,830
  - Density: 17,316/sq mi (6,686/km^{2})
- Time zone: UTC−5 (Eastern)
  - Summer (DST): UTC−4 (EDT)
- ZIP Codes: 21201, 21202, 21217
- Area Codes: 410, 443, 667

Mid-Town Belvedere is a neighborhood in Baltimore, Maryland, USA. The community lies north of the neighborhood of Mount Vernon, and is often described as part of it despite being officially separate. The Mount Vernon-Belvedere Association and the Midtown Community Benefits District both include Mid-Town Belvedere within their areas of purview.

== History ==
Mid-Town Belvedere is named for its location within the city and for the Belvedere Hotel, which was designed in 1902-1903 by the Boston architectural firm Thomas and Parker. During the first half of the twentieth century, the hotel was a primary lodging for affluent and well known visitors to Baltimore, including American presidents and celebrities. Belvedere Hotel took its name from the "Belvidere" estate of American Revolutionary War leader Colonel John Eager Howard, whose family sold lots of land for development during the 19th century as the City of Baltimore as it expanded north.

== Residents ==
Residents of Mid-Town Belvedere are predominantly renters, and include many students at the University of Baltimore and the Peabody Institute, as well as commuters who travel out of Baltimore Penn Station.

== Notable establishments ==
The neighborhood includes the Lyric Opera House, the Meyerhoff Symphony Hall, and the Baltimore Theatre Project. The Central Maryland Transportation Alliance (CMTA) is also based in Mid-Town Belvedere on Mount Royal Avenue.
