= Joseph Meyerhoff Symphony Hall =

Music venue in Baltimore, Maryland, U.S.

Coordinates: 39°18′14″N 76°37′8″W

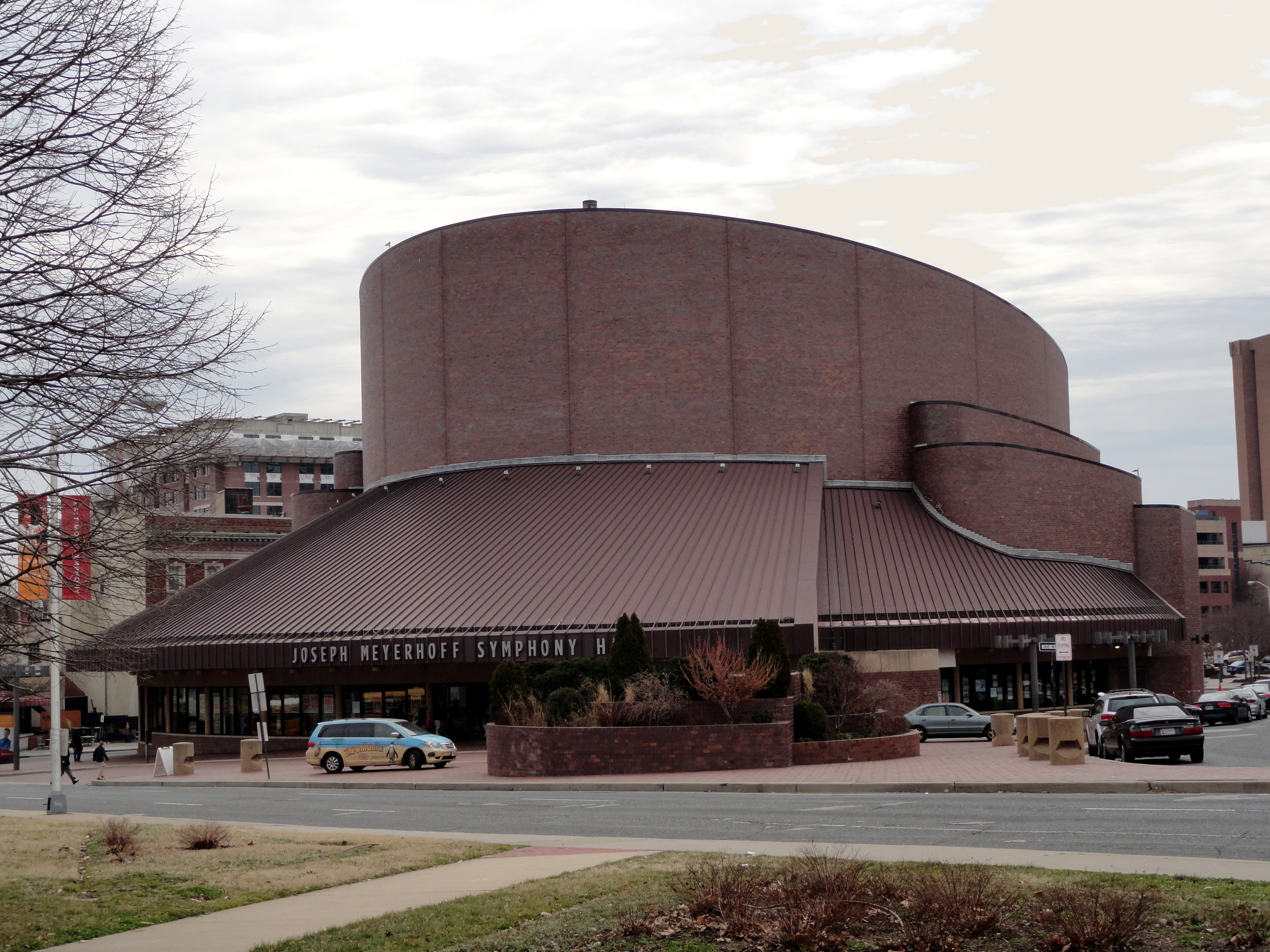
- Interactive map of Joseph Meyerhoff Symphony Hall
- Address: 1212 Cathedral Street; Baltimore, Maryland; United States
- Owner: Baltimore Symphony Orchestra
- Capacity: 2,443
- Type: Concert hall
- Public transit: Cultural Center; State Center

Construction
- Groundbreaking: November 10, 1978
- Opened: September 13, 1982
- Years active: 1982 - present
- Architects: Pietro Belluschi, Inc. and Jung/Brannen Associates

Website
- www.bsomusic.org

The Joseph Meyerhoff Symphony Hall, often referred to simply as the Meyerhoff, is a music venue that opened September 16, 1982, at 1212 Cathedral Street in the Mount Vernon neighborhood of Baltimore, Maryland, United States. The main auditorium has a seating capacity of 2,443 and is home to the Baltimore Symphony Orchestra. It is named for Joseph Meyerhoff, a Ukrainian-Jewish Baltimore businessman, philanthropist, and arts patron who served as president of the Baltimore Symphony from 1965 to 1983.

== Architecture ==
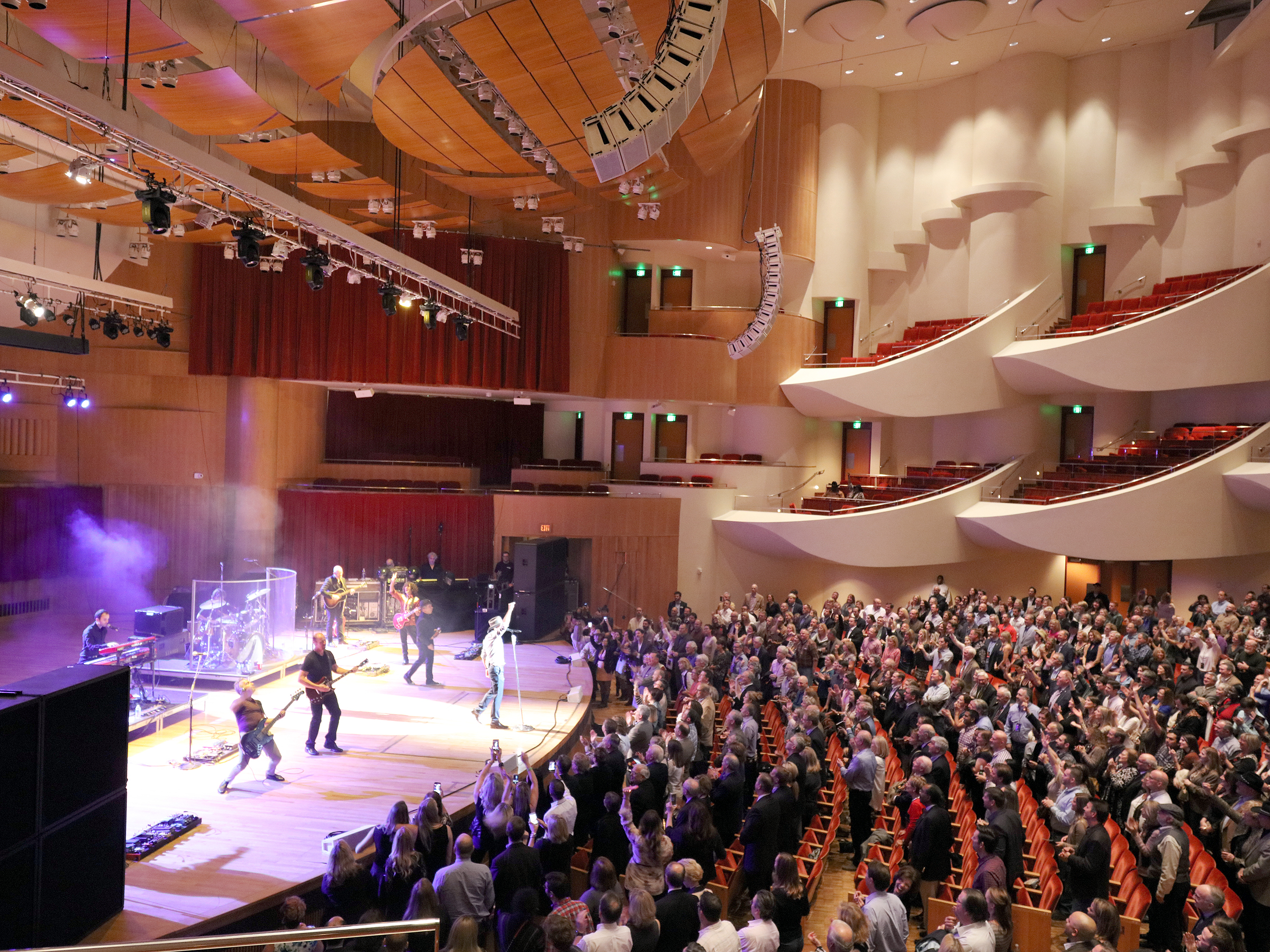
Interior of the Hall

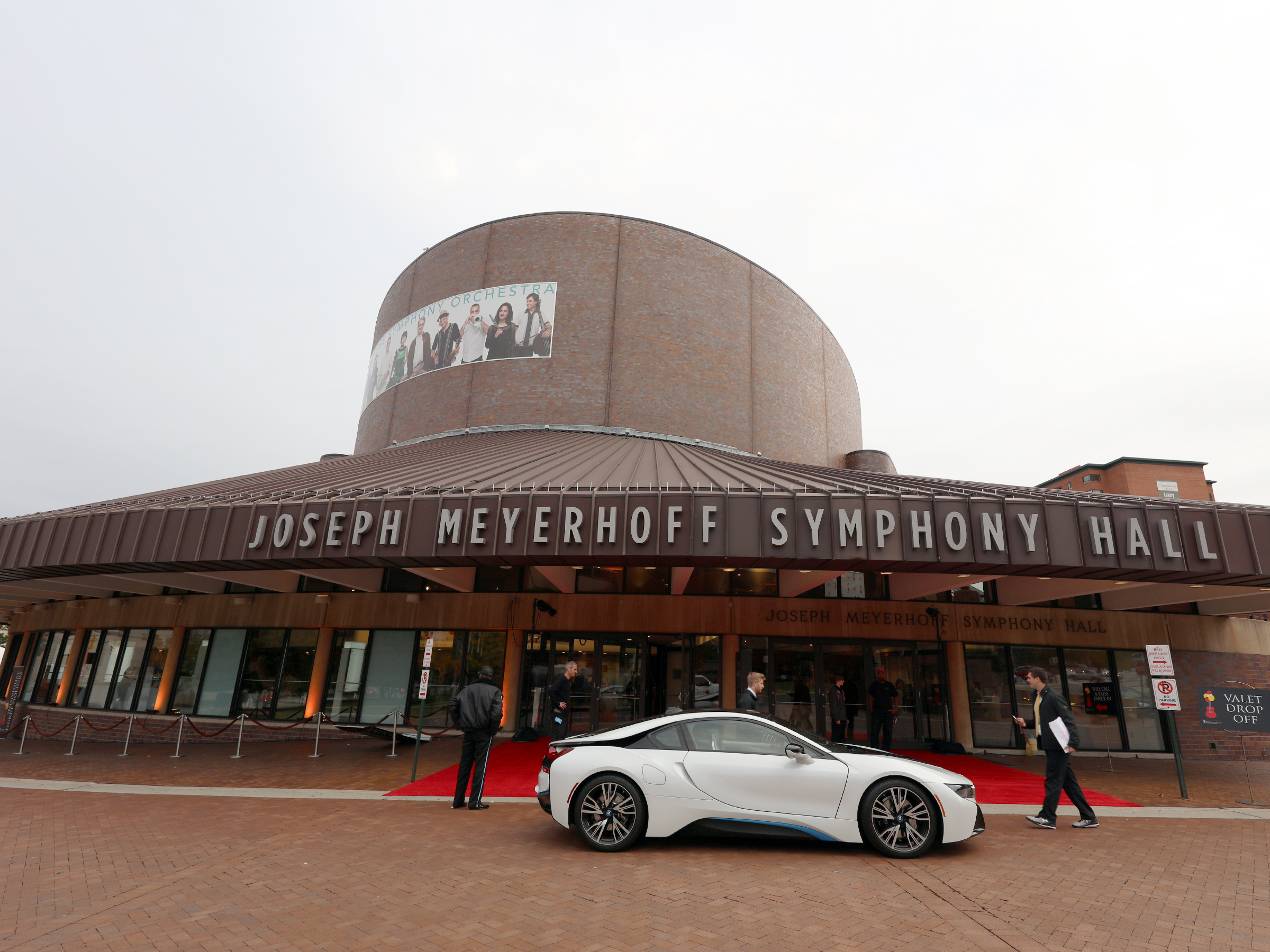
Main entrance from Preston Street

The modern style structure was designed by the architectural firms of Pietro Belluschi, Inc. and Jung/Brannen Associates. Ground was broken November 10, 1978. Acoustical design was by Bolt, Beranek and Newman and uses a series of convex curves to avoid flat surfaces or ninety-degree angles inside the hall.

The auditorium is oval, its cylindrical wall extends the entire height of the building with the roof sloping down over the stage area. The exterior surface of the cylinder is covered in brown brick and rises through the lobby to be clearly discernible on the exterior of the building. Backstage areas are housed in a concentric oval which projects from the rear of the building while the lobby and patron areas are housed under a sloping metal roof which extends from the building's front. The exterior lobby walls feature large expanses of glass to open the building to the plaza which surrounds it.

The auditorium ceiling ranges from a height of 44 ft (13 m) above the stage to 62 ft (19 m) at the rear wall. The walls of the stage are covered in a light-colored wood and feature box seats. Suspended above the stage originally were 52 precast concrete "clouds" which helped diffuse sound. In 1990, management added an extensive set of sound diffusers to improve the sound that the musicians heard on stage. These were removed as unsatisfactory after several seasons, and replaced in 2001 as part of a renovation project. The five-year project began in 1997 and also included a new stage lighting system, new stage risers and equipment lift, expanded storage and performer dressing rooms, increased patron washrooms and improved access for patrons with physical disabilities.

The stage is 65 ft (20 m) wide and 35 ft (11 m) deep. To accommodate a chorus, the rear wall moves to provide an additional 12 ft (3.7 m) of space.

In addition to the main auditorium, the facility includes the John Gidwitz Recital Hall, reception and meeting rooms and administrative offices.

The Meyerhoff is immediately adjacent to the Cultural Center Station on the Baltimore Light Rail, and within walking distance of the State Center Station on the Baltimore Metro Subway.

== History ==
The idea of a new home for the orchestra was first raised in 1969 by then conductor Sergiu Comissiona and executive director Joseph Leavitt. The orchestra's home at the time was the Lyric Opera House, and frequent scheduling conflicts forced the musicians to rehearse in school gymnasiums and prepare for concerts in dark and cramped backstage areas of the opera house. Major funding for construction came from a donation by Meyerhoff and grants from the State of Maryland and City of Baltimore.

At the opening concert, Comissiona led the orchestra in a world premiere performance of Housewarming by Morton Gould which was commissioned for the occasion. Other works on the program included Symphonic Variations by César Franck featuring pianist Leon Fleisher and Ein Heldenleben by Richard Strauss.
