= Midtown-Edmondson, Baltimore =

Midtown-Edmondson
- Neighborhood of Baltimore
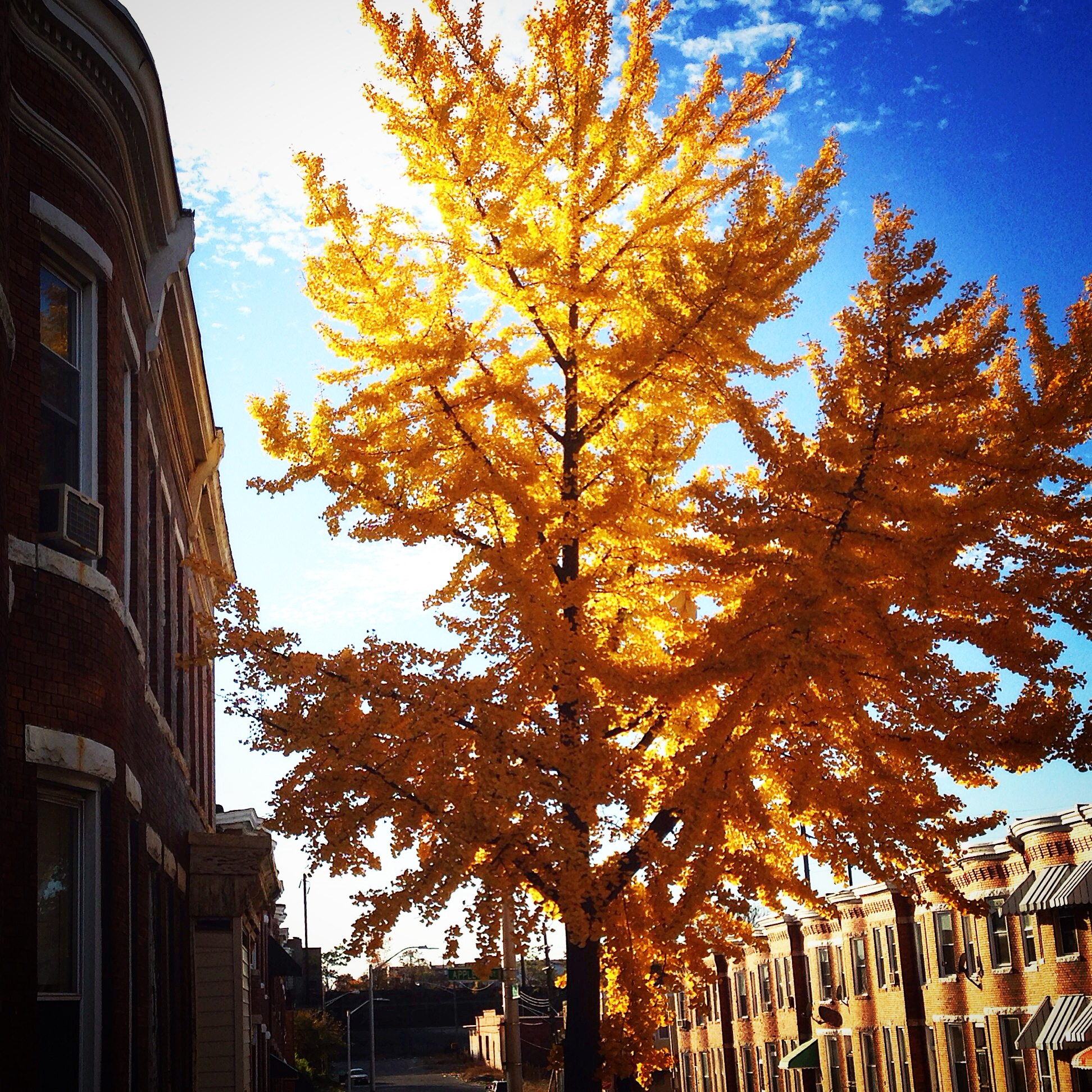
- Mosher St. Swell-Front Rowhouses

- Location within Baltimore
- Coordinates: 39°17′46″N 76°39′01″W
- Country: United States
- State: Maryland
- City: Baltimore
- Established: 1887
- Time zone: UTC-5 (Eastern)
  - Summer (DST): UTC-4 (EDT)
- ZIP code: 21217
- ZIP code: 21223

Midtown-Edmondson is a mixed-use neighborhood in western Baltimore City developed mostly between the 1880s and the 1910s. The neighborhood is mainly composed of residential rowhouses, with a mixed-used business district along Edmondson Avenue, and industrial warehouses and buildings dotted along the CSX railroads that bound its western edge.

== Boundaries ==
Baltimore City defines the neighborhood as bounded by North Bentalou St. to the west and North Monroe St. to the east, with north borders being the CSX train tracks, then West Lafayette Ave, and the south border formed by West Mulberry Street. Residents of Midtown-Edmondson would also include one or two blocks east of N. Monroe St toward N. Fulton St. The neighborhood includes zip codes 21217 and 21223.

== History ==
=== Overview ===
Residential development in Midtown Edmondson began as early as 1887 when local small builders constructed rowhouses and cottages with creative variations on the vernacular rowhouse conventions of the period. These homes were initially designed as summer homes for city residents, but with the expansion of streetcar infrastructure down Edmondson Avenue in the 1890s, rowhouse development quickly became marketed to the city's growing middle class population.

The mix of residential and industrial development reflects the uneven character of development in the years following the 1888 annexation of Baltimore County, as neighborhood groups in Midtown-Edmondson fought to secure investment for needed infrastructure and oppose the intrusion of commercial and industrial development, such as the Ward Baking Company in 1925, the Acme building and Interstate 170 (Maryland) highway construction in the 1970s.

During the post-World War II period, the population of Midtown-Edmondson and nearby neighborhoods underwent a rapid transition from European American in the mid-1940s to become predominantly African American by the early-1950s. This transition offered many middle class African American households in Baltimore their first opportunity for buying a home and led to the creation of neighborhood organization that took an active role in local civil rights organizing and activism.

While the physical development of the neighborhood was wholly complete by the beginning of World War II, the decades following 1945 saw significant changes. African Americans began moving west of Fulton Avenue in the mid-1940s and by the early 1950s the once segregated white neighborhood had become largely African American. From the 1960s through the present, the neighborhood experienced many of the same challenges affecting low-income African American neighborhoods across the city – including persistent vacant housing and disinvestment from commercial corridors like Edmondson Avenue. Despite these issues, the residents have remained resilient undertaking organizing efforts to try to address a range of community concerns.

=== 1880s-1940s ===
Industrial and commercial development within the Midtown Edmondson area is concentrated along the railroad tracks and along the historic routes for the electric streetcars. In addition, the two major east-west through streets, Lafayette Avenue and Edmondson Avenue, offered more opportunities for continued commercial investment than the streets that terminate at the railroad tracks. With the expansion of the streetcar along Edmondson avenue, scores of rowhouses converted to commercial use early in the 1900s. Examples visible from the 1914 Sanborn maps include a wallpaper store, a paint store, a bakery, a hardware store, a drugstore, and a Chinese laundry. The Arrow Laundry at North Pulaski between Lafayette Avenue and Lanvale Street operated between 1914 and the early 1950s. As another example, the Pressman Brothers Grocery Store operated at 2237 Edmondson Avenue.

One resident in this period, Jerry Leiber, later recalled his own experience growing up above his family's confectionery store at Riggs and McKean Avenues: "We were raised working in the store on the first floor and living in back of the store and on the second floor. We all worked in the store. When I was old enough to list, I started bagging potatoes and sorting out soda bottles by brands to turn them into the companies for cash. The neighborhood was full of Jewish-owned grocery stores. Spivak's was at Monroe and Lanvale Streets, Giller's at Mosher Street and Kirby Lane.

By 1951, the rowhouses facing Edmondson Avenue between North Payson and Bentalou Streets had been entirely converted from residential to at least partially commercial use. Other commercial and industrial development required new construction.

==== American Ice Company ====
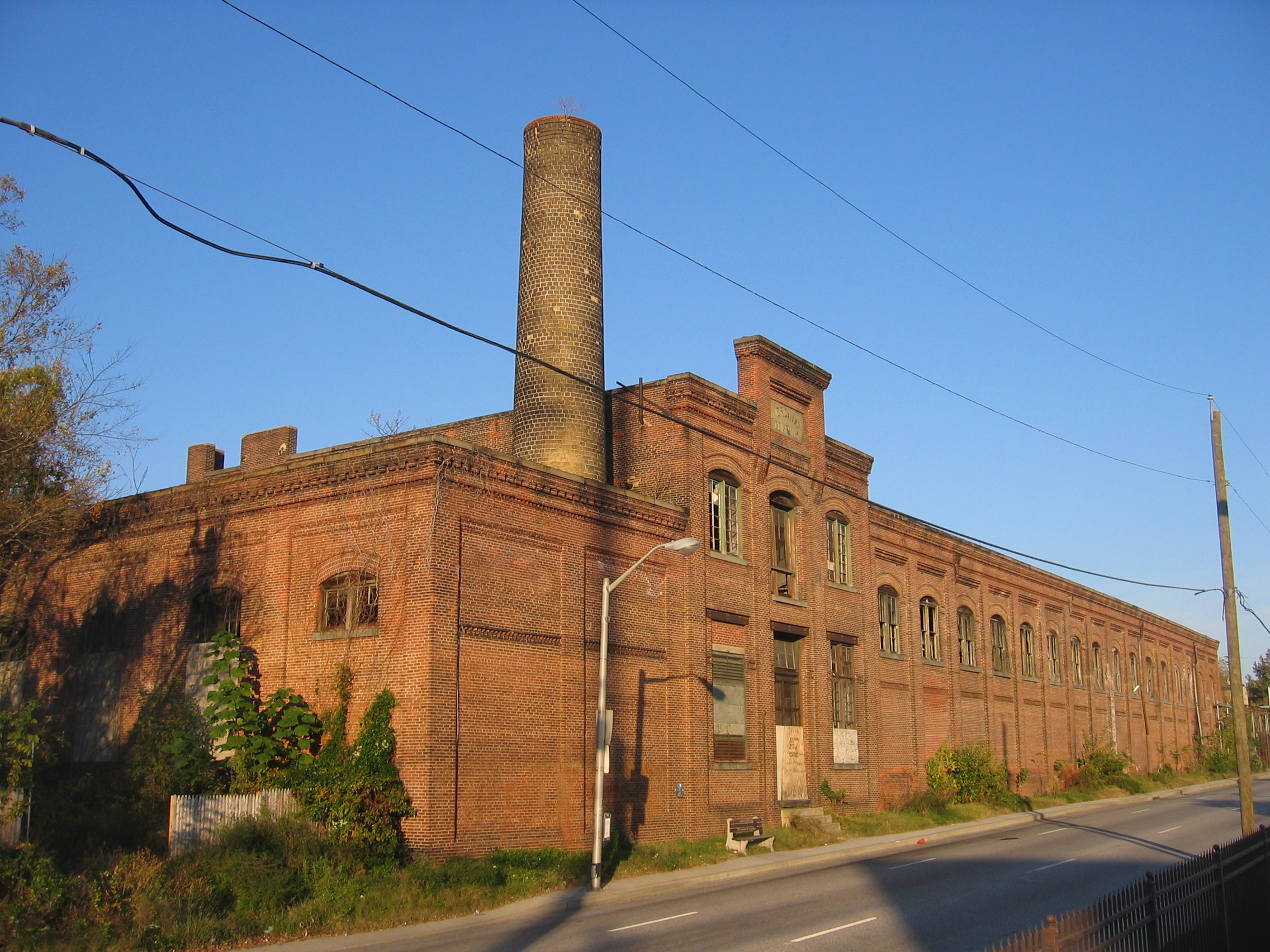
American Ice Company

Constructed in 1911, the American Ice Company is an enduring reminder of West Baltimore’s industrial development. It is located at 2100 W. Franklin Street and the grounds contain a powerhouse that backs up to the CSX Railroad tracks. The Ice Company building was built during a time when West Baltimore was quickly developing beyond the 1816 city line as small builders put up new rowhouses that soon extended west out to the Gwynns Falls. The company was following the market trend toward "manufactured ice." The previous decade had witnessed a shift in the ice industry from importing natural ice from rivers and lakes in the Northeast to direct competition with new factories that enabled businesses to supply a more regular and consistent supply of "manufactured ice."

In 2004, the building was severely damaged in a fire, and has not returned to operation since. The current owner has supported the building being part of Midtown-Edmondon's recent nomination to the National Register of Historic Places, and he plans to redevelop the property while retaining the historic ice house structure.

==== Ward Bakery ====
Built in 1925 over the loud protests of local residents who opposed a new factory in their residential neighborhood, the Ward Baking Company is a handsome brick box, designed by C.B. Comstock, a New York-based refrigeration architect and engineer. Based in Pittsburgh, the Ward Baking Company, then known as the Ward Bread Company, also had factories in the Bronx, Buffalo, and East Orange, New Jersey. Long retired as a factory, the building has more recently been used as a church.

=== 1940s - 1960s ===
Racial transition in the Midtown Edmondson neighborhood took place in somewhat of a distinct pattern from the experiences of neighborhoods in Greater Rosemont and Edmondson Village located to the west of the railroad tracks. The transition occurred at an uneven pace during the late 1940s and early 1950s, evidently without the startling rapidity that was observed in other areas. This unusual character of change is likely the result of these blocks being immediately proximate to Fulton Avenue that had for nearly two decades defined West Baltimore's "color line."

During the 1910s and 1920s, racial transition in West Baltimore neighborhoods was occasionally accompanied by violence against black residents and white residents who rented or sold properties to black Baltimoreans. Around the beginning of World War II, the "color line" had stabilized around Fulton Avenue. Beginning in the late 1940s, however, neighborhoods at this edge began to transition from white to black. The change was driven by a number of factors including the rapid growth of Baltimore's African American population during the 1940s and 1950s, the intense overcrowding and deteriorating housing conditions within historically segregated African American neighborhoods, and the movement of white households out of the center city to the areas of new development in the Baltimore suburbs

=== 1960s - 2000s ===
The African American residents of Midtown Edmondson built a new identity for the neighborhood in the 1940s, 1950s and 1960s. New groups moved into the area like the Bandolero's Motorcycle Club that opened a clubhouse at 2025 Edmondson Avenue in 1967.

For two weeks following the assassination of Martin Luther King Jr. on April 4, 1968, a series of civil disturbance devastated neighborhoods across the city of Baltimore, leaving six people dead, dozens injured and hundreds of properties, both private and public, burned and damaged. Riots began in Washington, DC and Detroit on April 5 and in Baltimore on April 6. By April 7, 1968, violence spread to Midtown Edmondson where stores were looted along Edmondson Avenue and Payson Street. By the morning of April 9, the Army began a citywide attempt to prevent further looting, reportedly including boarding up partially plundered stores and exploding a bomb of CS gas inside, starting on the 2000 block of Edmondson Avenue. By April 10, the disturbances began to end. Across the city, losses totaled $10 million. There were a reported 1,150 fires, 1,150 incidents of lootings, and nearly 5,000 arrests over the four days of unrest.

Many of the corner stores and small businesses located in the area closed in the 1970s and 1980s but some long time institutions, like Green's Hardware, remained. Later additions included the former Super Pride Groceries location at the northeast corner of Lafayette and Edmondson Avenue.

==== Black Panthers – 1971 ====
In 1971, the Black Panthers organized a free clothes program at the 1800 block of Edmondson Avenue, part of a larger "survival project" organized by the party including a free medical clinic at the 500 block of Mosher Street and an expanded free breakfast program providing meals in the Lafayette Square area.

==== Super Pride Groceries – 1970s ====
Charles Thurgood Burns (1915-1991) established Super Pride Groceries in 1970 when he took over the bankrupt Super Jet Market on East Chase Street. Renaming the business Super Pride, he rebuilt it despite the "refusal of some food companies to do business with a black-owned store." Burns had started in the grocery business around 1921 delivering groceries for the small store his grandfather owned on Dolphin Street. He sold vegetables, produce and fish out of the back of a cart during high school and college then later became the co-owner of Hilton Court pharmacies - a chain of pharmacies "catered to the needs of black consumers at a time when white-owned businesses ignored them."

Between 1970 and 1990, Super Pride grew to seven locations, employing more than 400 people, and making over $43 million in annual sales. Under Burns' leadership, Super Pride sponsored Black History Month activities and supported the Arena Players. By the late 1990s, however, the business struggled to compete against national chains and the city's shrinking population. In the fall of 2000, Super Pride closed all eight of its locations and, in November, held an auction to liquidate the stores and their remaining equipment to satisfy creditors.

==== Edmondson Community Organization – 1992 ====
Neighborhood residents led an effort in the early 1990s to establish the Edmondson Community Organization. In June 1995, the U.S. Marshall's office and the U.S. Attorney for Maryland confiscated the Underground nightclub located at 2114 Edmondson Avenue and turned it over to the Edmondson Community Organization in an effort to push back against drug traffic in the area. The community organization took over the building under the leadership of president Charlotte M. Perry but limited funding made it difficult for the organization to expand its services to the community.

The ECO Building continues to host meetings for Midtown Edmondson residents and other community organizations. In the past few years, neighborhood residents met at the ECO building between November 2006 and early January 2007 to form the West Baltimore Coalition and advocate for the development of the West Baltimore MARC Station Area. The coalition led to the organization of the West Baltimore MARC Transit-Oriented Development Transportation, Inc. (WBMTTI) that operated a farmer's market in the area for several years.

==== ROOTS Fest – 2011 ====
In 2011, several West Baltimore communities, including Midtown-Edmondson hosted the ROOTS Fest 2011: Many Communities, One Voice. This five-day event sought to empower and unite West Baltimore communities through the celebration of arts and culture. The festival, hosted over Interstate 170 (Maryland), which divides the community, kicked off with three-days of workshops on the intersection of art, culture, community organizing and empowerment, and was followed by a weekend of music, art, dancing, food and other free activities. It attracted thousands of people and nationally renowned artists and performers, such as go-go performer, Chuck Brown, and World Music/Spoken Word/Bluegrass rap duo Rising Appalachia.

== Demographics ==
As of the 2010 census, there were 1,163 people living in the neighborhood. The racial makeup of Midtown-Edmondson was 97.6% African American, 1.1% White, 0.1% Native American, 0.1% Asian, 1.3% from other races, and 0.8% from two or more races. Hispanic or Latino of any race were 0.4% of the population. 38.8% of occupied housing units were owner-occupied. 51.1% of housing units were vacant.

48.1% of the population were employed, 12.8% were unemployed, and 39.1% were not in the labor force. The median household income was $23,819. About 32.2% of families and 30.8% of the population were below the poverty line.

== Historic District Nomination ==
In 2014, parts of Midtown-Edmondson were included in the Edmondson Avenue Historic District. By 2015, the neighborhood was nominated for its own District.

== Public Transit ==
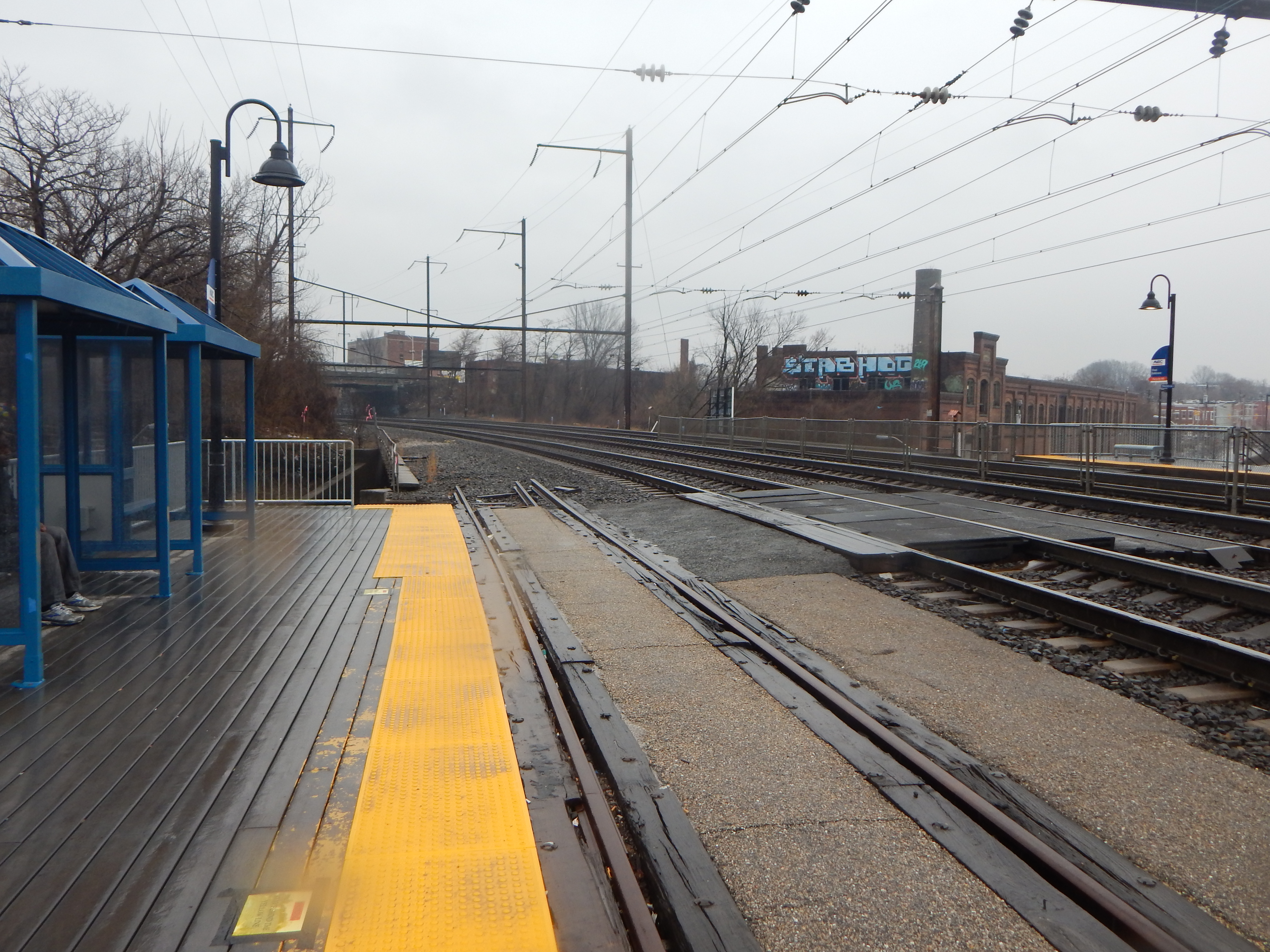
Present-day MARC station with American Ice Company Building in Background

=== Bus ===
Midtown-Edmondson is serviced by three city buses:

- 15 Security Square/Westview to Overlea/White Marsh
- 23 Rolling Road/Wildwood to Fox Ridge
- 40 QuickBus Security Square Blvd. at CMS. to Middle River

=== Train ===
The neighborhood is also serviced by the West Baltimore (MARC station) for regional transit to Washington, DC. This station is along the Penn Line of the MARC train service route, providing service seven days a week. It also provides 660 free parking spaces, 335 of which were recently completed in the winter of 2014.

== Representation ==
=== Community-Level ===
Midtown-Edmondson's oldest and most established citizen's group is the Midtown-Edmondson Avenue Improvement Association (MEAIA), located at 2114 Edmondson Avenue; the building is named the Edmondson Community Organization (ECO). MEAIA meets the last Thursday of the month (the 4th or 5th Thursday depending on the month) at the ECO building.

=== District-Level ===
Midtown-Edmondson is located within Baltimore City's 9th City Council District. The current representative for the 9th District is Councilman William "Pete" Welch.

=== State-Level ===
Midtown-Edmondson is located in the Maryland House of Delegates District 44a. The current representative is Delegate Roxane L. Prettyman.

=== Federal-Level ===
Midtown-Edmondson falls within Maryland's 7th Congressional District, currently represented by U.S. Representative Kweisi Mfume.
