= Route 991 (MTA Maryland) =

Bus route operated by the Maryland Transit Administration

991

Overview
- System: Maryland Transit Administration
- Operator: Eyre Bus Company
- Began service: 1993
- Predecessors: Hagerstown and Frederick Railway

Route
- Communities served: Hagerstown, Frederick, Urbana, Shady Grove
- Landmarks served: Rock Spring Business Park
- Start: Hagerstown
- Via: I-70, I-270
- End: Shady Grove Metro Station

Service
- Frequency: 17 AM, 16 PM, 1 midday
- Transfers: MARC Train Brunswick Line; TransIT (Frederick bus service); Metrorail Red Line; Metrobus Route Q2; Ride-On Bus Routes 100, 43, 46, 53, 55, 57, 58, 59, 60, 61, 63, 64, 65, 66, 67, 71, 74, 76, 78, 79, 90, 100

Route 991 is a commuter bus route operated by the Maryland Transit Administration in the U.S. state of Maryland between Hagerstown, Frederick, and the Shady Grove Metro Station. The line has since been split into two different routes. The line is operated by the private contactor Eyre Bus Company. Service operates on weekdays only, providing AM service from Hagerstown to Shady Grove, and PM service from Shady Grove to Hagerstown, operating primarily along I-270 and I-70. The buses also operate to Rock Spring Business Park. Two stops are made in Frederick County.

The line is one of the fastest growing in the MTA's commuter bus network, with more than 1000 daily riders, the most popular commuter bus line in the MTA system.

Overcrowding has been one of the issues with the line. In particular, riders boarding in Frederick have been faced with this overcrowding, since their stops are second to the one in Hagerstown, and many buses have been full by the time buses leave Hagerstown. In 2008, new service was added to the line to reduce overcrowding. Consideration has also been given to operating some trips to Hagerstown only and others to Frederick only.
