= Cultural Center station =

Light rail station in Baltimore, Maryland, US

Cultural Center
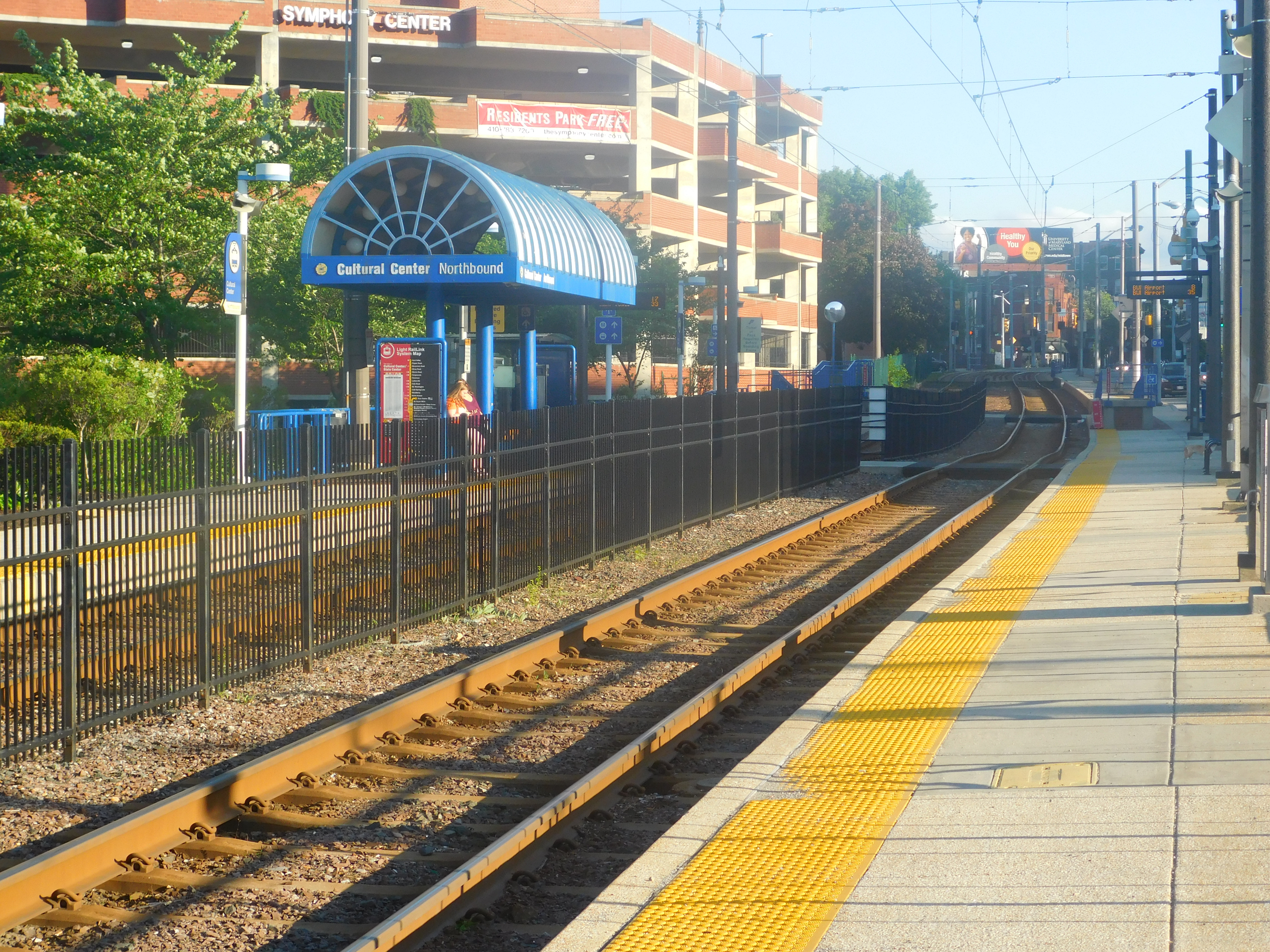
- Cultural Center station in April 2019

General information
- Location: 903 North Howard Street; Baltimore, Maryland
- Coordinates: 39°18′13.3″N 76°37′13.6″W
- Owner: Maryland Transit Administration
- Platforms: 2 side platforms
- Tracks: 2
- Connections: State Center station 14, 19, 21, 27, 311, 320, 410, 412

Construction
- Cycle facilities: Bike Share Stop #34 (12 docks)
- Accessible: Yes

History
- Opened: April 2, 1992
- Former names: Cultural Center / State Center

Passengers
- 2017: 731 daily

Services
Preceding station	Maryland Transit Administration	Following station
Mt. Vernon toward BWI Airport or Glen Burnie	Light RailLink	Mt. Royal/MICA toward Hunt Valley
Mt. Vernon toward Camden Yards	Light RailLink Penn–Camden Shuttle	Mt. Royal/MICA toward Penn Station
Location

Cultural Center station is a Baltimore Light RailLink station located along Howard Street in the Mount Vernon neighborhood of Baltimore, Maryland, adjacent to the Joseph Meyerhoff Symphony Hall. It has two side platforms served by two tracks. The station opened on April 2, 1992, as part of the first phase of the system.

While there is no direct connection between the Light Rail and the Baltimore Metro SubwayLink system, the Cultural Center Light Rail station is located near the State Center station on the Metro.
