= State Center station =

Baltimore Metro SubwayLink station

State Center
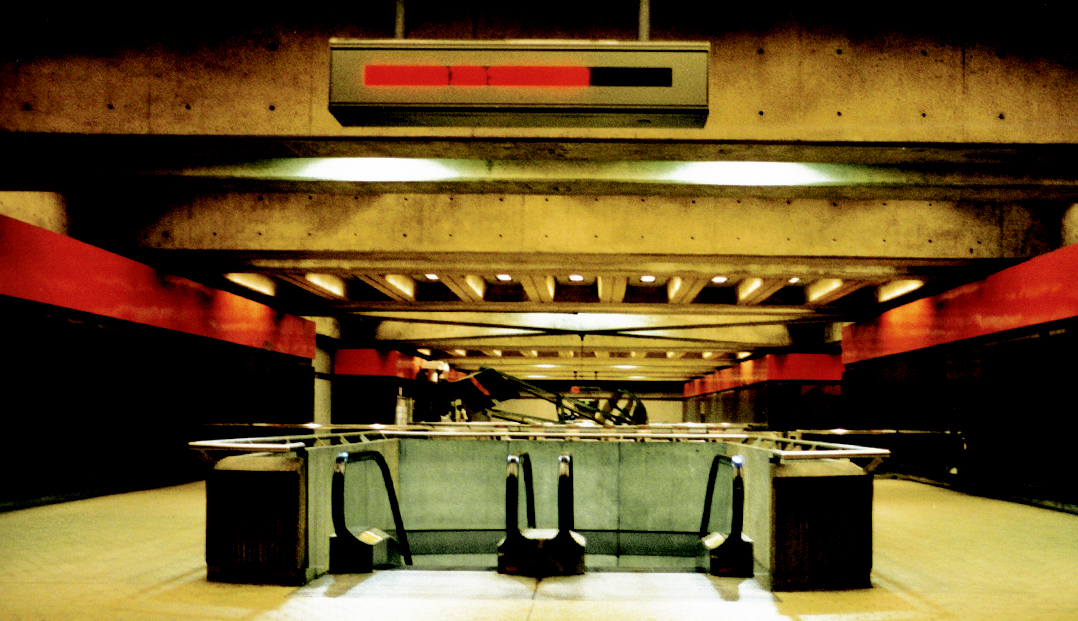
- Mezzanine at the State Center station

General information
- Location: 302 West Preston Street (Preston and Eutaw Streets); Baltimore, Maryland
- Coordinates: 39.30158°N 76.62299°W
- Owner: Maryland Transit Administration
- Tracks: 2
- Connections: Light RailLink (at Cultural Center station); MTA Maryland Buses

Construction
- Accessible: Yes

History
- Opened: November 21, 1983
- Former names: State Center/Cultural Center (1983–2017)

Passengers
- 2017: 1,661 daily

Services
Preceding station	Maryland Transit Administration	Following station
Upton–Avenue Market toward Owings Mills	Metro SubwayLink	Lexington Market toward Johns Hopkins Hospital
Location

State Center station (formerly State Center/Cultural Center station) is an underground Baltimore Metro SubwayLink station in Baltimore, Maryland. It is a transit hub offering connections to the Baltimore Light RailLink system, the tenth most northern and western station on the line, the first one in the area viewed by many as "downtown Baltimore," and is within a 2 block walk of the Cultural Center station on the Light RailLink system, via Preston Street, and many area landmarks.

The stations elevator and escalator entrance is located on the corner of West Preston Street and North Eutaw Street which is directly adjacent to the Maryland States Office Complex, hence the name "State Center." It is within the boundaries of the Madison Park neighborhood and is also very close to the adjacent neighborhoods of Bolton Hill, Mid-Town Belvedere, Mount Vernon, and Seton Hill.

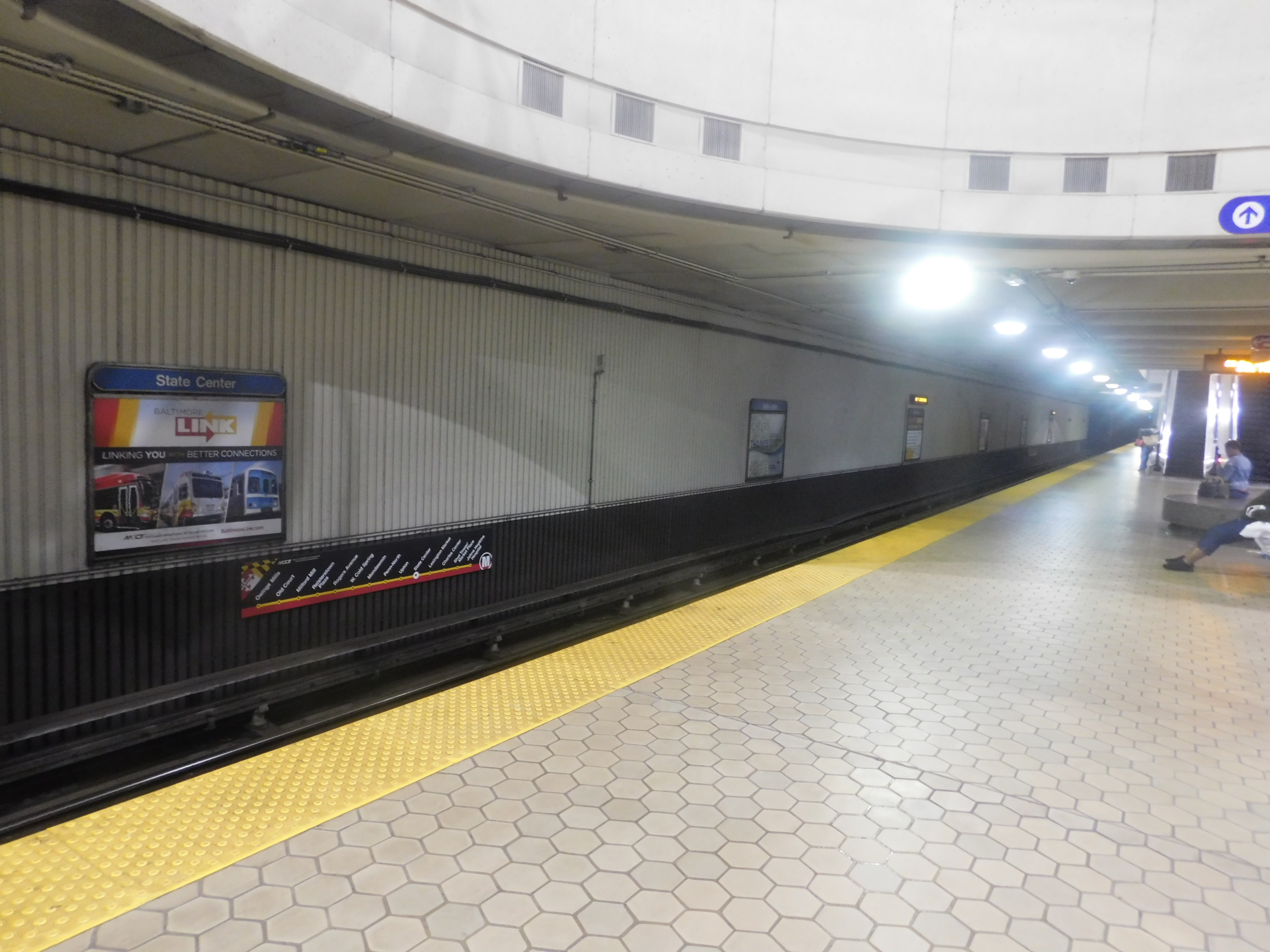
State Center station platform

== Artwork ==
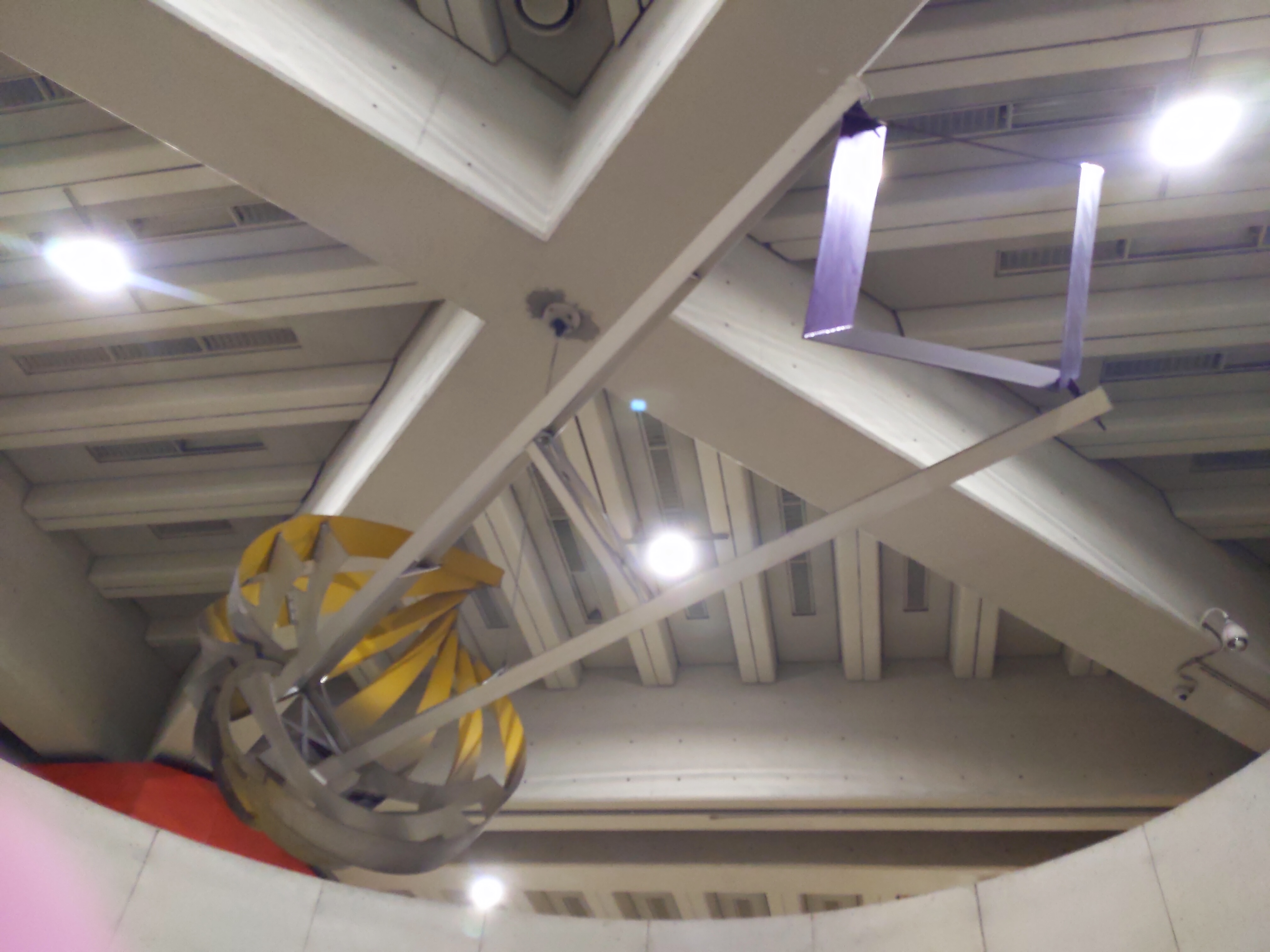
Paul Daniel's "Venter" suspended over State Center station

State Center station features a mobile sculpture entitled "Venter," which is suspended in a large opening between its upper and lower level. The sculpture was created by Baltimore artist Paul Daniel at a $39,000 commission in 1983.

== History ==
State Center station was initially referred to as the Bolton Hill station during its planning and construction, in reference to the adjacent neighborhood to the site's north.

=== Excavation and construction ===
The Bolton Hill tunnels constructed around State Center station were driven with a shield through Cretaceous alluvium and through mica schist-derived residual materials. Hand mining was required to advance the face of the tunnel in some areas where the alignment passed through more resistant, hard residual materials.
