= Mount Holly, Baltimore =

Mount Holly
- neighborhood statistical area
- Location within Baltimore
- Coordinates: 39.312333°N 76.674934°W
- Country: United States
- State: Maryland
- City: Baltimore

Area
  - Total: 0.124 sq mi (0.32 km^{2})
  - Land: 0.124 sq mi (0.32 km^{2})

Population (2011)
  - Total: 1,023
  - Density: 8,250/sq mi (3,190/km^{2})
- Time zone: UTC-5 (Eastern)
  - Summer (DST): UTC-4 (EDT)
- ZIP code: 21216
- Area code: 410, 443, and 667

Mount Holly is a neighborhood in the Southwest District of Baltimore, located between the neighborhoods of Fairmont (south), Walbrook (east) and Garwyn Oaks (north). Its boundaries are drawn by Denison Street (east), Clifton Avenue (southwest), Gwynns Falls Parkway (north), Windsor Mill Road (northwest), and West North Avenue (south). Gwynns Falls Leakin Park is located to the west of Mount Holly.

== Demographics ==
The population of Mount Holly, measured at 1,023 in 2011, was almost exclusively (96.5%) black. Median household income for the neighborhood in 2011 was $31,613, slightly below the citywide median of $38,721. Residents of Mount Holly living at an income below the poverty line were estimated at 26.1 percent in 2011, also below the citywide rate of 25.1 percent. The average sale price of homes in Mount Holly was $27,415 in 2013.

== Public transportation ==
Two transit bus routes provide public transportation to the neighborhood's residents, with connections to the Baltimore Metro, Light Rail and MARC train as well as other bus routes. Both have stops along Clifton Avenue in Mount Holly.

- Route 15 (MTA Maryland) runs between Security Square Mall (west) and Perry Hall (east).
- LocalLink 80 (BaltimoreLink) traveling between Sinai Hospital (north) and City Hall (south), has a stop at Pennsylvania Station (Baltimore), providing passengers with access to Amtrak and the MARC Train. It also has stops at Metro and Light Rail stations.

== See also ==
- List of Baltimore neighborhoods
