= Berea, Baltimore =

Berea
- neighborhood statistical area
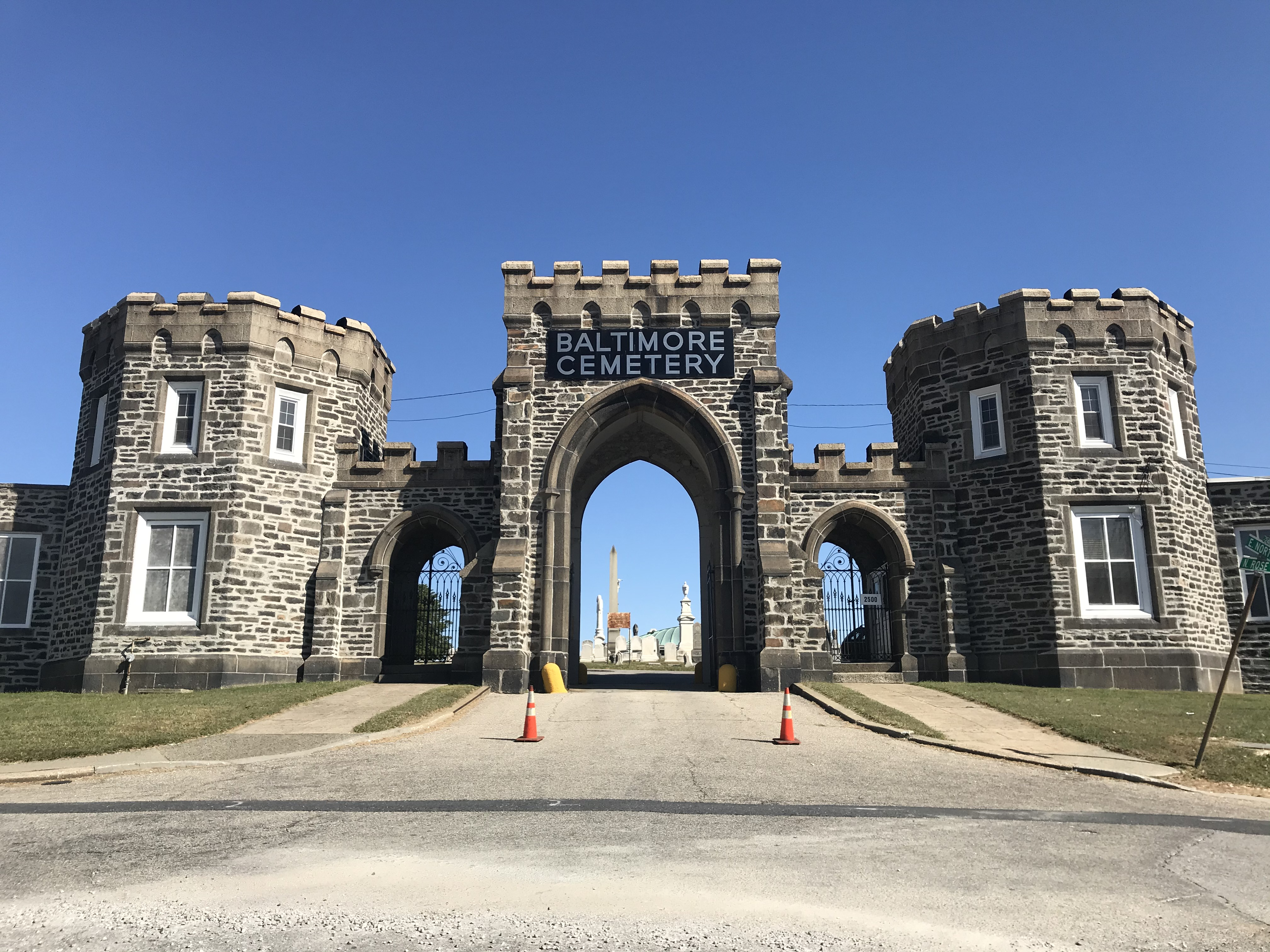
- Baltimore Cemetery entrance at 2500 E. North Avenue in Berea, Baltimore

- Location within Baltimore
- Coordinates: 39.308501°N 76.578076°W
- Country: United States
- State: Maryland
- City: Baltimore

Area
  - Total: 0.439 sq mi (1.14 km^{2})
  - Land: 0.439 sq mi (1.14 km^{2})

Population (2009)
  - Total: 4,597
  - Density: 10,500/sq mi (4,040/km^{2})
- Time zone: UTC-5 (Eastern)
  - Summer (DST): UTC-4 (EDT)
- ZIP code: 21213
- Area code: 410, 443, and 667

Berea is a neighborhood in the East District of Baltimore. Its boundaries are the south side of Sinclair Lane, the east side of Milton Avenue, the west side of Edison Highway, and the north side of Biddle Street. Berea lies between the neighborhoods of Broadway East (west) and Orangeville (east), north of the Biddle Street neighborhood and south of Four By Four.

The area is considered middle class with African Americans being the majority of the population.

Berea was a filming location for The Wire, a Baltimore-based HBO drama.

== See also ==
- List of Baltimore neighborhoods
