= Broadway East, Baltimore =

Neighborhood in Baltimore

Broadway East
- neighborhood statistical area
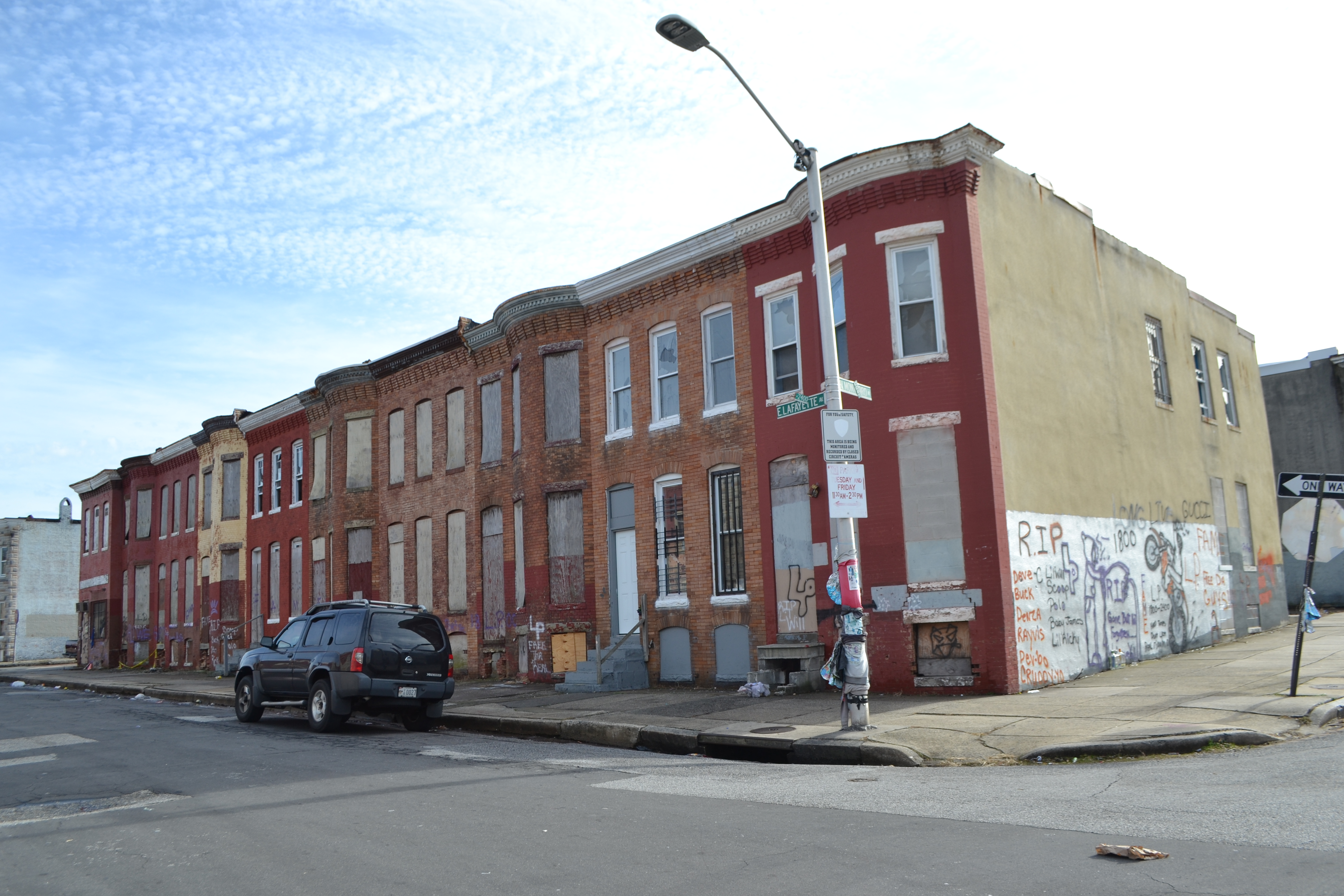

- Location within Baltimore
- Coordinates: 39°18′30″N 76°35′21″W
- Country: United States
- State: Maryland
- City: Baltimore

Area
  - Total: 0.440 sq mi (1.14 km^{2})
  - Land: 0.440 sq mi (1.14 km^{2})

Population (2009)
  - Total: 6,629
  - Density: 15,100/sq mi (5,820/km^{2})
- Time zone: UTC-5 (Eastern)
  - Summer (DST): UTC-4 (EDT)
- ZIP code: 21213
- Area code: 410, 443, and 667

Broadway East is a neighborhood in the East District of Baltimore. Its boundaries are the south side of North Avenue, the west side of Milton Street, the east side of Broadway, and the north side of Biddle Street. The neighborhood lies east of Oliver, north of Middle East, south of Lake Clifton, and west of Berea.

Though the area was once considered middle-class, it has in the 20th century experienced economic depression, housing abandonment, and increased crime. The neighborhood was affected by the Baltimore riot of 1968. Its residents are largely poor and working-class African Americans. A filming location for The Wire (TV series), a Baltimore-based HBO drama. The Broadway East community is undergoing a resurgence which includes the Mary Harvin Transformation Center and Senior Housing, the renovation of the American Brewery (building), the Baltimore Food Hub, and the Southern Streams Health and Wellness Center and Southern Views Multi-family Housing which is currently under construction and the development of affordable housing and mixed use property development cited in the East Baltimore Revitalization Plan adopted by the Baltimore City Planning Department in September 2018.

== See also ==
List of Baltimore neighborhoods
