= St. Charles Towne Center =

Shopping mall in Waldorf, Maryland

- Location: Waldorf, Maryland, USA
- Coordinates: 38°37′14″N 76°55′41″W
- Address: 11110 Mall Circle
- Opened: March 30, 1990
- Manager: Simon Property Group
- Owner: Simon Property Group
- Num. of stores: 128
- Num. of anchor tenants: 6 (5 open, 1 coming soon)
- Floor area: 980,418 sq ft (91,083.8 m^{2})
- Floors: 2 (1 in Dick's Sporting Goods and Macy's Home Store)
- Public transit: Charles County VanGo bus: 301 Connector, Business B, St. Charles B, St. Charles C
- Website: St. Charles Towne Center

St. Charles Towne Center is a two-level, enclosed shopping mall in the planned community of St. Charles in Waldorf, Maryland. Built in the late 1980s, it covers an area of 980,418 sq ft (91,083.8 m^{2}), and is currently the only regional mall in Southern Maryland. In addition to Waldorf and St. Charles, the mall also serves the southern suburbs of Washington, D.C., and has a trade area population of 338,502. Anchor stores are Dick's Sporting Goods, J. C. Penney, Kohl's, Macy's, and Macy's Home Store.

== History ==
The mall opened March 30, 1990, with J. C. Penney, Hecht's, Montgomery Ward, and Sears as anchors. It was built by Melvin Simon & Associates, now known as Simon Property Group. Kohl's was added in 1997. The Montgomery Ward store was split between a second Hecht's location and Dick's Sporting Goods in 2002. Both Hecht's stores became Macy's in September 2006. Sears closed in April 2020. There is also a movie theatre located across the street from the mall, formerly known as Cineplex Odeon Cinemas (1988–1998), Loews Cineplex Entertainment (1998–2005), and is now AMC Theatres (2005–present).

=== 2007 renovation ===
St. Charles Towne Center underwent a major renovation in 2007 to shift its image to a more family-oriented mall. The entrances and inside of the mall were redesigned, and the bathrooms were made larger to allow easier access for families with young children. In addition, a kid's play area was added to one section of the mall. The food court was also renovated during the project. The renovation was completed by 2008.

=== Sports and Wellness Complex ===
On February 6, 2020, it was announced that the Sears location at St. Charles Town Center would be closing as part of a plan to close 31 stores nationwide. The store closed in April 2020, after having been at the mall for thirty years.

The store remained vacant until July 24, 2024, when it was announced by the Charles County Government that a Sports and Wellness complex would be introduced to the mall, with the local government wanting to bring more recreational facilities to the county. It is expected to cost $7.5 million to convert the site. As of 2025, the opening date is still to be determined.
