= Route 21 (MTA Maryland) =

Bus route in Maryland, USA

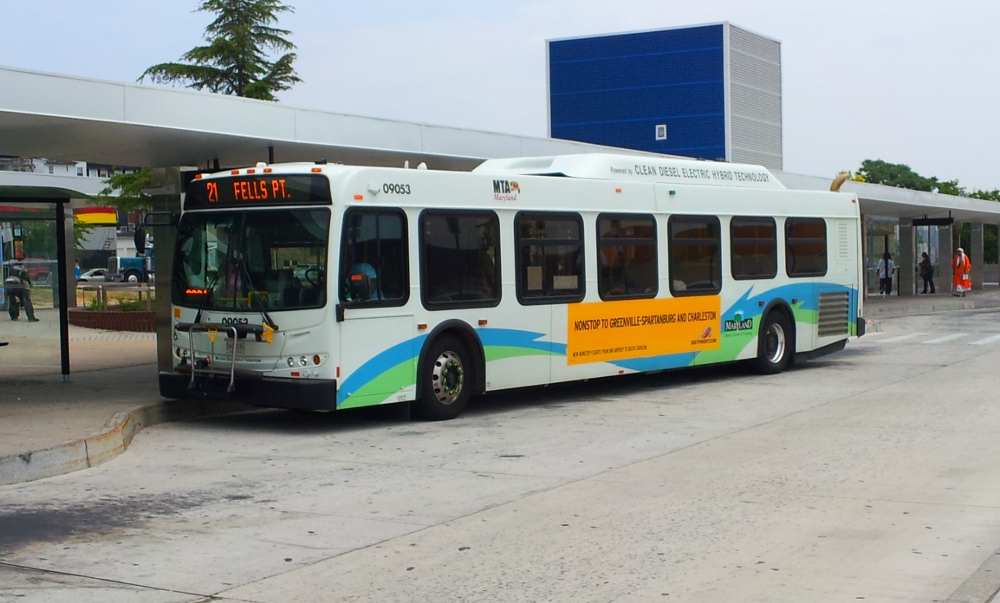

Overview
- System: Maryland Transit Administration
- Garage: Eastern
- Status: discontinued
- Began service: 1938
- Ended service: 2017

Route
- Locale: Baltimore City
- Communities served: Sandtown-Winchester; Upton
- Landmarks served: Johns Hopkins Hospital; Sojourner Douglas College
- Other routes: 1, 3, 5, 7, 8, 10, 11, 13, 15, 16, 19, 20, 22, 23, 27, 30, 35, 36, qb40, qb46, qb47, qb48, 51, 52, 53, 54, 61, 64, 91, 97

Service
- Level: Daily
- Frequency: Every 30 minutes Every 20 minutes (peak)
- Weekend frequency: Every 60 minutes
- Operates: 5:00 am to 1:00 am

Route 21 was a bus route operated by the Maryland Transit Administration in Baltimore. The line ran from the Mondawmin Metro Subway Station to Fells Point, serving the corridors of Gilmor Street, Preston/Biddle Streets, and Caroline Street, and the communities of Sandtown-Winchester, Mt. Royal, and Butcher's Hill. The bus route was the successor to the 21 Preston Street–Caroline Street and Dolphin Street streetcar lines.

On June 18, 2017, as a part of the BaltimoreLink network redesign, Route 21 was discontinued, and replaced by the CityLink Lime, CityLink Pink, and CityLink Navy routes.

== History ==
Route 21 was electrified in 1895 as a streetcar line along Preston and Caroline Streets. In 1938, the line was converted to a rubber tire bus service.

In 1957, the line was extended along Carey Street to the current loop at Cumberland and Carey Streets. The line did not have any routing changes until February 8, 2009, when it was extended north to the Mondawmin Metro Subway Station along Pennsylvania Avenue.
