= QuickBus =

QuickBus or "qb" may refer to the following Maryland Transit Administration bus routes:

- Route 40, operating from Woodlawn to Middle River
- Route 46, operating from Cedonia to Paradise
- Route 47, operating from Walbrook Junction to Overlea
- Route 48, operating from Towson to Downtown Baltimore
