= CityLink Yellow (BaltimoreLink) =

Bus route operated by the Maryland Transit Administration

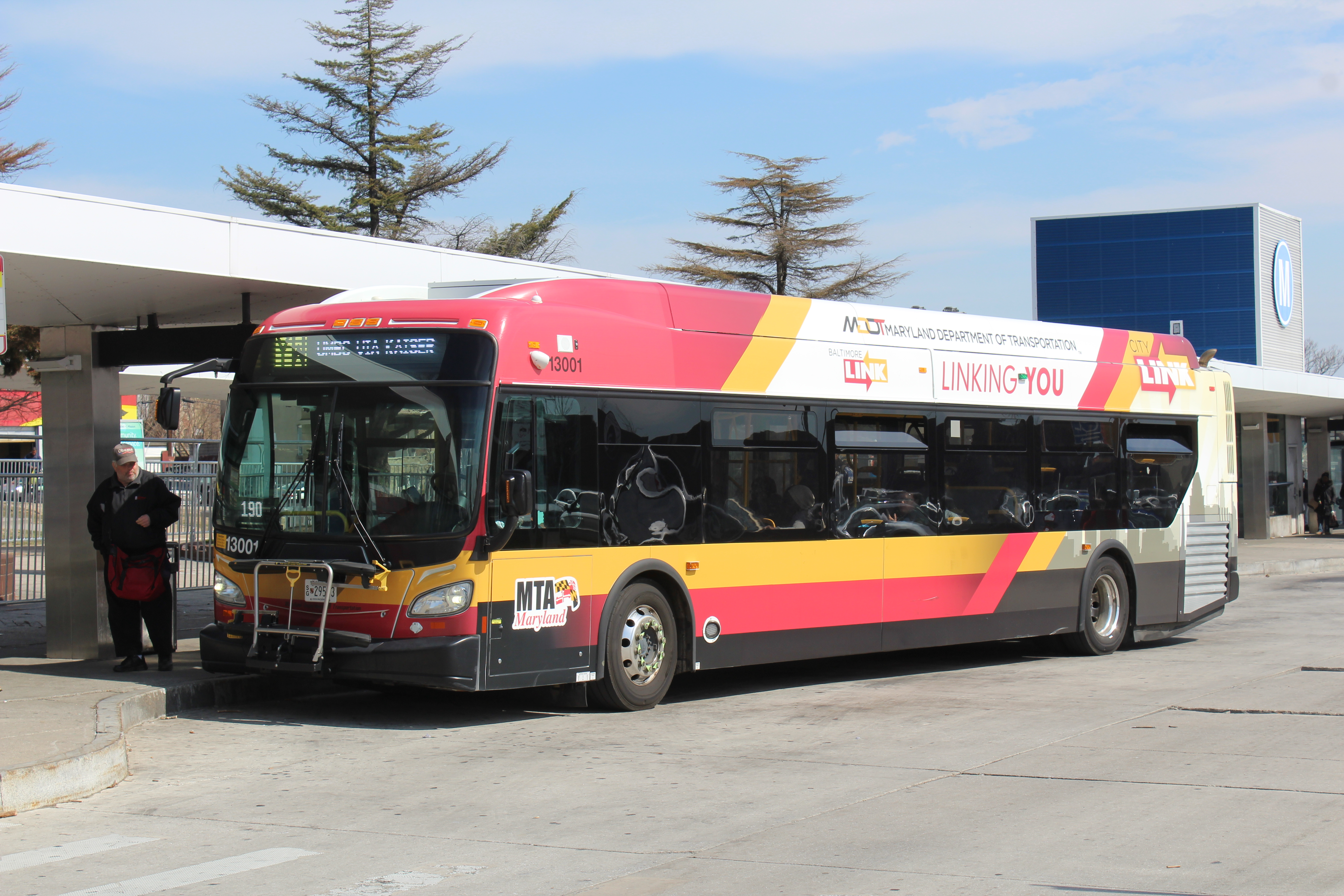
- CityLink Yellow bus at Mondawmin station

Overview
- System: MTA BaltimoreLink
- Garage: Kirk; Bush
- Status: active
- Began service: 1947
- Predecessors: Guilford Avenue elevated streetcar

Route
- Locale: Baltimore City
- Communities served: Ramblewood; Waverly; Pigtown; Halethorpe
- Landmarks served: Baltimore City College
- Other routes: 1, 3, 5, 7, 8, 10, 11, 12, 13, 15, 16, 19, 20, 21, 22, 23, 27, 30, 33, 35, qb40, 44, qb46, qb47, qb48, 51, 58, 61, 64, 77, 91, 120, 150, 160

Service
- Level: Daily
- Frequency: Every 15 minutes Every 12-15 minutes (peak)
- Weekend frequency: Every 30 minutes
- Operates: 24 Hours a Day

CityLink Yellow (abbreviated YW) is a bus route operated by the Maryland Transit Administration in Baltimore and its suburbs. The line currently runs from the intersection of York Road and Northern Parkway to the Riverview, with some trips making short turns at Washington Boulevard and Monroe Street. The line serves the corridors of The Alameda, Kirk Avenue, Guilford Avenue, and Washington Boulevard.

== History ==
The Route 36 designation has been used for the north end of this route since 1947 without Route 36 being one of the first bus routes in the Baltimore area not to have a streetcar origin. The only portion of the north end of this line to have been served by a streetcar was the section along Guilford Avenue, where the No. 1 Streetcar line ran from 1895 to 1947 as an elevated streetcar.

The south end was not a part of this route until it annexed the southern portion of Route 11 in 2008. Route 11 served the Washington Boulevard corridor since 1959. Prior to that, the corridor had been served by the No. 27 streetcar (no relationship to the current Bus Route 27) from 1905 to 1938. This was converted to the No. 27 electric trolley bus, which operated from 1938 to 1957, which operated along with the No. 52 bus, which operated up to Harman Street. The nos. 27 and 52 buses were combined into a single route identified as Route 27, which was combined with Route 11 in 1959.

=== Combining 11 and 36 ===
Since 1998, plans to split Route 11 in the downtown area, combine the former southern portion of Route 11 with Route 36, and leave the northern portion of Route 11 as a separate line have been proposed on multiple occasions.

The first was in 1998. The plan was to operate Route 36 from York Road and Northern Parkway to Riverview, and Route 11 from Rodgers Forge/GBMC/Goucher College to the Inner Harbor. This was ultimately scrapped.

In 2005, as part of the Greater Baltimore Bus Initiative, it was proposed that Route 36 would be combined with the southern portion of Route 11 and extended along the Washington Boulevard corridor to Riverview with short turns at Monroe Street. This plan was delayed as a result of public outcry pertaining to other routes, and was not implemented that year.

Late in 2007, this change was proposed again, but it was also proposed that the routing in the Lansdowne area would be modified to serve a new Wal-Mart Supercenter that had recently been constructed. This change was implemented on February 17, 2008.

== See also ==
- History of MTA Maryland
