= CityLink Gold (BaltimoreLink) =

Bus route operated by the Maryland Transit Administration in Baltimore

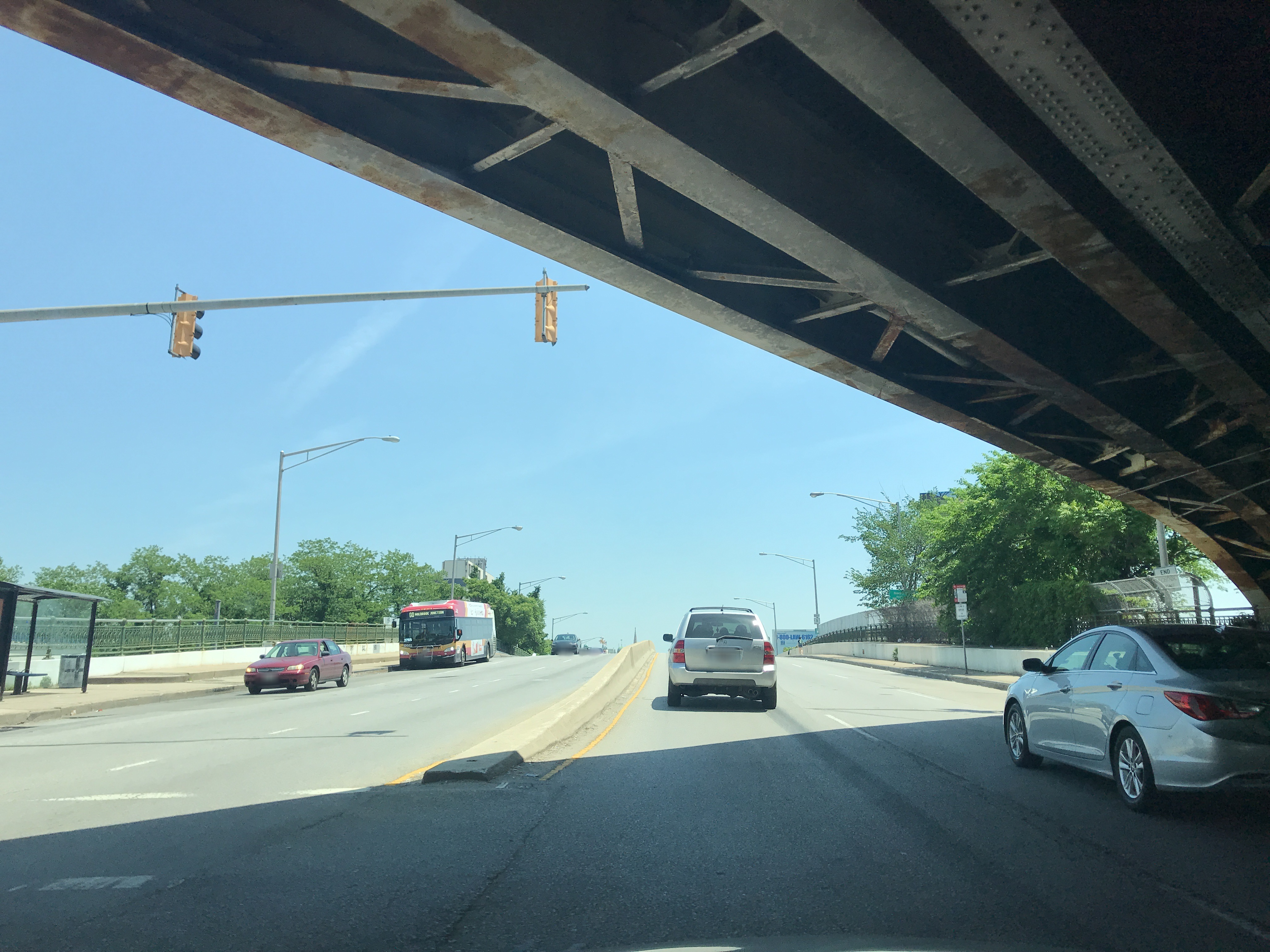

Overview
- System: MTA BaltimoreLink
- Garage: Eastern; Northwest
- Status: active
- Began service: 1954
- Predecessors: No. 13 Streetcar

Route
- Locale: Baltimore City
- Communities served: Rosemont; Butcher's Hill; Fells Point
- Landmarks served: Coppin State University; Great Blacks in Wax Museum; Johns Hopkins Hospital
- Start: Canton Crossing / Berea
- Via: Wolfe St (EB), Washington St (WB), North Avenue
- End: Walbrook Junction
- Length: 8.5 miles (13.7 km)
- Other routes: 1, 3, 5, 7, 8, 10, 11, 12, 15, 16, 19, 20, 21, 23, 27, 30, 35, 36, 38, qb40, qb46, qb47, qb48, 51, 54, 61, 64, 91, 97, 104 120 160

Service
- Level: Daily
- Frequency: Every 10 minutes Every 8 minutes (peak)
- Weekend frequency: Every 10-15 minutes
- Operates: 24 Hours a Day
- Ridership: 1,780,857 (2022)

CityLink Gold (abbreviated GD) is a bus route operated by the Maryland Transit Administration in Baltimore. It replaced Route 13 in 2017. The line currently runs from Walbrook Junction in West Baltimore (the intersection of North Avenue, Hilton Street, and Bloomingdale Road) to Canton, mostly along North Avenue. The line has two main branches, both operating to Canton: one that operates via Fells Point (these buses are marked Fells Point) and the other via Linwood and East Streets (these buses are marked Canton). Both these branches serve Johns Hopkins Hospital. Additionally, selected trips on weekdays and Saturdays operate to the block of Milton Avenue, Federal Street, and Patterson Park Avenue.

In 1999, Route 13 has the highest farebox recovery rate of all MTA bus lines, recovering nearly its entire cost.

The current bus route is the successor to the 13 North Avenue and 22 Washington Street–Canton streetcar lines.

== History ==
Route 13 was Baltimore's first streetcar line, having started its operation in 1890 along North Avenue. In 1898, the no. 22 streetcar line on Washington Avenue began operation; this ran until 1938 when it was absorbed into the no. 34 streetcar. The no. 33 bus started operating along Milton Street in 1950, and was absorbed into Route 13 in 1954, the same year the no. 13 streetcar was converted into a bus. In 1975, the Highlandtown portion of the no. 34 bus became a part of today's Bus Route 22.

Throughout most of the years of its operation, few other routing changes were made to Route 13. In 2005, as part of the Greater Baltimore Bus Initiative, a comprehensive overhaul for the region's transit system, MTA announced that the following changes would be made to Route 13:

- All trips to both Fells Point and Canton would operate along Patterson Park Avenue between North Avenue and Monument Street, rather than Washington/Wolfe Streets (on which Fells Point trips operated) and Milton Street (route of the Canton trips). This would provide simplified service and allow riders on both branches to reach Johns Hopkins Hospital.
- The frequency of service would be improved. Midday and Saturday service would operate every 10 minutes instead 15, and Sunday service every 15 minutes instead of 20.
- Branches on the line to Social Security and Lower Canton would be eliminated. Riders would be directed to use other buses to reach Social Security, and there would be no service to Lower Canton.

All these plans were implemented on October 23, 2005.

Even before these plans were finalized, they drew a lot of controversy. Of particular concern were the changes in the route between North Avenue and Monument Street, and the removal of buses from Washington/Wolfe Streets and Milton Street. This required elderly residents of these communities to walk up to six blocks extra in order to reach the line.

After the implementation of these changes, a large uproar among riders was held. Riders demanded that Route 13 return to its old route immediately, and local media picked up on the story.

On February 5, 2006, MTA implemented new changes to Route 13, partially returning buses to their old route. All trips to Canton and Fells Point now operate via Washington/Wolfe Streets rather than Patterson Park Avenue. A new branch on the line was formed, which operated along North Avenue, then looped via Milton Street, Federal Street, and Patterson Park Avenue. This branch, which operates every 30 minutes on weekdays from 6:30 am to 6:30 pm, and has more limited Saturday service, meets the needs of senior citizens in these areas.

== BaltimoreLink ==
As part of the BaltimoreLink transit overhaul plan, on June 18, 2017 Route 13 will be served by two different routes. CityLink Gold will take over the section from Walbrook Junction to Canton Crossing, and LocalLink 21 will take the Highlandtown section of Route 13, going to the Woodberry Light Rail station.

== In theater ==
In 2010, Run of the Mill Theater created six 15-minute plays based on the Route 13 bus. The plays were created by riding the bus and interviewing random passengers.

== Hopkins Express ==
Route 104

Overview
- System: Maryland Transit Administration
- Garage: Kirk
- Status: Reinstated
- Began service: 2000 (Reopened Sept 2017)
- Ended service: Present (Sept 2017)
- Predecessors: No. 13 Hopkins express

Route
- Locale: Baltimore City; Baltimore County
- Communities served: Baynesville; Knettishall; Hillendale; Ramblewood; Northwood; Ednor Gardens
- Landmarks served: Good Samaritan Hospital; Johns Hopkins Hospital
- Other routes: 3, 5, 13, 15, 19, 33, 35, 36, 44, qb46, qb47, 55, 58

Service
- Level: Weekdays only
- Frequency: One am trip and one pm trip (peak)
- Operates: 7:30 am to 5:15 pm

In the past, trips from various other locations that were designated as Hopkins Express operated to the area of Johns Hopkins Hospital. These were designated Route 13, and provided express service along the corridors of other bus routes on weekdays to Johns Hopkins Hospital.

In 2000, these lines were redesignated. The Towson branch, which had operated along the route of Route 8, was redesignated Route 103. The Cromwell Bridge Park-and-Ride branch, which had operated along the corridor of Route 3, was redesignated Route 104.

In 2005, as part of GBBI, both Routes 103 and 104 were proposed to be eliminated. Route 103 was eliminated as planned. But Route 104 survived and remains in operation to this day.

The Route 104 (Hopkins Express) operates one-trip southbound during morning peak-hour and one-trip northbound during evening peak-hour.
