= Route 7 (MTA Maryland) =

Bus route operated by the Maryland Transit Administration

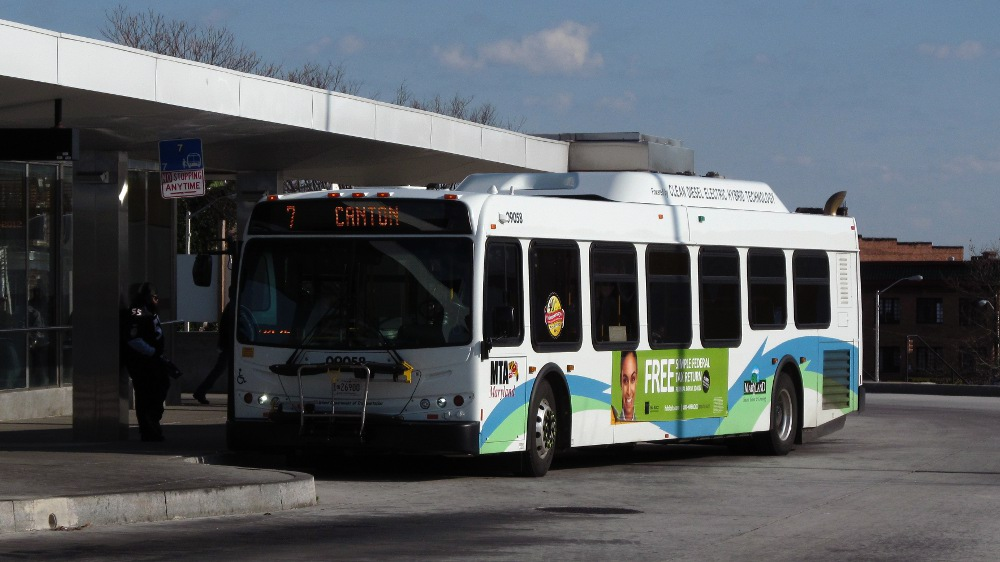

Overview
- System: Maryland Transit Administration
- Garage: Eastern; Northwest
- Status: defunct
- Began service: 1959
- Ended service: 2017
- Predecessors: No. 18 Streetcar

Route
- Locale: Baltimore City
- Communities served: Upton; Seton Hill; Little Italy; Butcher's Hill
- Landmarks served: University of Maryland, Baltimore; Oriole Park at Camden Yards; Convention Center; Harborplace; National Aquarium; Patterson Park
- Other routes: Navy, 3, Yellow, 8, 10, 11, 13, 15, 16, 19, 20, 21, 22, 23, 27, 30, 35, 36, qb40, qb46, qb47, qb48, 51, Lime, 53, 54, 61, 64, 91, 97, 120, 150, 160

Service
- Level: Daily

Route 7 was a bus route operated by the Maryland Transit Administration in Baltimore. The line, which operated between 1959 and 2017, ran from Canton, Baltimore to the Mondawmin Metro Subway Station, serving the communities of Butcher's Hill, Little Italy, and Sandtown-Winchester.

== History ==
The bus route is the successor to the 18 Canton, 18 Pennsylvania Avenue, and Hudson Street streetcar lines; the Pennsylvania Avenue Line was the second streetcar line in Baltimore. Between 1893 and 1931, the Route 7 designation was used for a streetcar that operated between Govanstown and Irvington as a short-turn version of the No. 8 Streetcar. The no. 7 designation was not given to this route until 1959, when it was combined with the Reisterstown Road bus, which at that time had that designation.

The Baltimore City Passenger Railway opened a line along Baltimore Street, Greene Street, Pennsylvania Avenue, and Cumberland Street to Boundary Avenue (now North Avenue) on August 24, 1859. The line was later extended along North Avenue, McCulloh Street, and Cloverdale Road to Madison Avenue, and through-routed to Canton (via Baltimore Street, Broadway, Bank Street, and other streets) as the Green Line. The line was electrified in 1894 and numbered Route 18 in 1899.

Bus Route L began serving Reisterstown Road to Pikesville on July 3, 1929. On June 27, 1948, it was combined with Route 5 as Route 5/7; Route 7 trips were extended downtown along Druid Hill Avenue, where Route 5 had run as a streetcar line until then. Route 18 was replaced by buses on June 8, 1952, and on September 6, 1959, it was absorbed into Route 7, which was shifted from Druid Hill Avenue to Pennsylvania Avenue.

Soon after the Metro Subway opened, Route 7 was truncated on June 18, 1984, to its current terminal at Mondawmin station during the subway's operating hours. One new route - Route M-2 - was formed beyond Mondawmin, along Reisterstown Road to Old Court Road at Pikesville. It was extended to the Old Court Metro Subway Station on August 31, 1987, soon after that station opened. Route 7 was truncated full-time to Mondawmin in 2001, when subway and Route M-2 hours were extended.

In 2005, as part of the Greater Baltimore Bus Initiative, MTA planned to eliminate Route 7 completely and require riders to walk a few blocks to other nearby routes. Due to public outcry, this line remained intact. In future proposed phases of GBBI, plans were in place to reduce the frequency or change the routing of Route 7, but no such changes were made.

On June 18, 2017, as part of the BaltimoreLink transit overhaul Route 7 will be divided into multiple routes. CityLink Lime will take over the upper part of the Pennsylvania Avenue section of Route 7, LocalLink 65 will take over the Pratt and Lombard Streets to Canton part of Route 7, and LocalLink 73 will take over the lower part of Pennsylvania Avenue to Paca and Greene Streets part of Route 7.

== Rosewood service ==
Between 1970 and 2000, a special service using the no. 7 (or 7X) designation operated for the employees of Rosewood Center in Owings Mills. The service has started to replace Route H service operated by experimental Job Express Transit in 1969. Rosewood trips shared parts of the regular route of Route 7, including some parts in which limited stops were made, hence an express designation.

In 1997, a new Route M-17 was formed. Route M-17 started as a replacement for special branches of Routes M-9 and M-16, which were combined at the time.

The initial proposal was for the 7 Rosewood branch to be discontinued except on Sundays, and the new Route M-17 to serve Rosewood on weekdays and Saturdays. But public outcry resulted in the 7 Rosewood service being retained. When Route M-17 was first introduced in 1997, it did not serve Rosewood at all, and simply operated between the Business Center at Owings Mills and the Owings Mills Corporate Campus. But a year later, Route M-17 was modified to serve Rosewood as well as the T. Rowe Price Owings Mills campus. Later in 1998, Route M-17 had another addition in which service to the ADP building on Red Run Boulevard, providing service to other office buildings that would eventually be built along Red Run. Midday service to Red Run existed briefly in 1999, but was discontinued due to low ridership.

In 2001, the 7 Rosewood service was redesignated Route 102. Routing was also modified to serve the Owings Mills Metro Subway Station. The name change was not free of controversy.

In 2005, as part of the Greater Baltimore Bus Initiative, Route 102 was discontinued. Low ridership and a heavy burden on taxpayers was cited as the reason. Additional trips were added on Route M-17 to accommodate riders of Route 102, including late night and weekend service. Other parts of Route M-17 that had low ridership were also discontinued, including those to the Owings Mills Corporate Campus and T. Rowe Price.

On August 30, 2009, following the closure of Rosewood, Route M-17 was discontinued and the Red Run Portion was absorbed by the 59. No replacement was made for any service north of Reisterstown Road.

== In popular culture ==
- The no. 7 bus is found in the novel Woodholme By DeWayne Wickham. In this book, the main characters have a driver catch them up to a no. 7 bus on Reisterstown Road.
