= CityLink Green (BaltimoreLink) =

Bus route operated by the Maryland Transit Administration

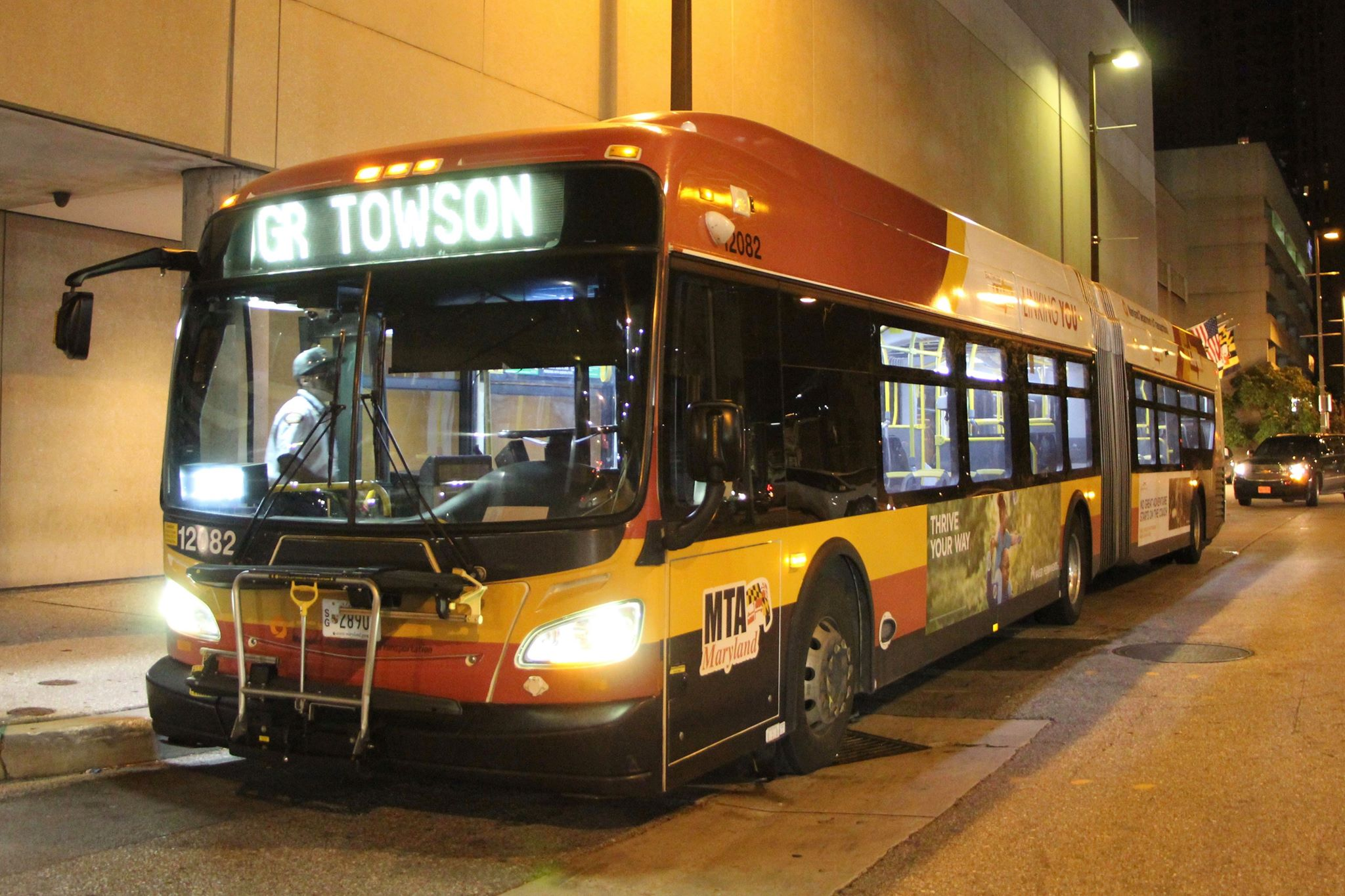
- Towson-bound CityLink Green bus in Downtown

Overview
- System: MTA BaltimoreLink
- Garage: Bush; Kirk
- Status: active
- Began service: 1947
- Predecessors: No. 17 Streetcar; Bus Route T

Route
- Locale: Baltimore, Baltimore County
- Communities served: Towson; Ramblewood; Waverly; Charles Village; Mt. Vernon
- Landmarks served: Towson University; Towson Marketplace; Good Samaritan Hospital; Union Memorial Hospital; Johns Hopkins University; Penn Station; Washington Monument
- Other routes: 1, 5, 7, 8, 10, 11, 12, 13, 15, 19, 20, 21, 22, 23, 30, 33, 35, 36, qb40, 44, qb46, qb47, qb48, 55, 58, 61, 64, 91, 120, 150, 160

Service
- Level: Daily
- Frequency: Every 15-20 minutes Every 10 minutes (peak)
- Weekend frequency: Every 15-30 minutes
- Operates: 24 hours

CityLink Green (abbreviated GR) is a bus route operated by the Maryland Transit Administration in Baltimore and its suburbs. The line currently runs from the Inner Harbor with most trips operating to Cromwell Bridge Road Park and Ride (at exit 29 off the Baltimore Beltway) in Baynesville along the corridors of Loch Raven Boulevard and St. Paul Street, with selected trips to Sheppard Pratt Hospital in Towson, mostly via Joppa Road, and some trips making short turns at Loch Raven and Taylor. It is the successor to the 17 St. Paul Street streetcar line that ran from 1893 to 1938 and the Route T bus that ran from 1939 to 1947 and the Route 3 bus which ran until 2017.

== History ==
Streetcars on Route 17 provided service along St. Paul Street during the streetcar era of Baltimore. At this time, the Loch Raven Boulevard corridor was mostly undeveloped. Bus service along Loch Raven did not begin to operate until 1940, when Route T was introduced. This line operated along Loch Raven and 33rd Street as far north as Northwood.

The no. 3 designation was not used for any part of this route until 1947. The no. 3 designation was previously used in Baltimore transit history for a streetcar line that operated along Linden Avenue that would eventually be extended to Halethorpe along the Wilkens Avenue corridor. As the Linden Avenue section would later become a part of the no. 5 streetcar, bus route 3 would later serve Halethorpe.

The no. 3 Baynesville to downtown bus resembling today's service began in 1956, when the no. 3 line absorbed the service of Route 45, which operated between Waverly and Baynesville since 1949. In 1959, the line was combined with the Halethorpe Streetcar Line (known as Route 12 in its final days) and extended to Halethorpe along the Wilkens Avenue corridor, where it served St. Agnes Hospital and UMBC. It followed this route until 1987, when the line was split. After that, service along the Wilkens Avenue corridor was provided by the new Route 31. Service along the same route is currently provided by Route 35.

Route 3 gained ridership along Loch Raven Boulevard in Baltimore County even prior to the corridor's development.

In 1990, a new branch was added to Route 3 that operated to Towson and Sheppard Pratt primarily along Joppa Road. This new service replaced a branch of Route 8 to Eudowood.

== Greater Baltimore Bus Initiative ==
In 2005, as part of the Greater Baltimore Bus Initiative, a comprehensive overhaul plan for the region's transit system, MTA proposed to eliminate the Sheppard Pratt branch on the route, and eliminate all short turns, except for the Goucher & Taylor loop during peak hours. Sheppard Pratt branch riders were instructed to transfer to Route 55, which was proposed to have an improved frequency.

After a public outcry, MTA put these plans on hold, and revised them in 2006. The new proposal would not only retain the Sheppard Pratt branch, but would modify its route to serve Osler Drive and provide weekend service in this area. This plan was implemented on February 17, 2008.

== BaltimoreLink ==
Route 3 was replaced by the BaltimoreLink transit system on June 18, 2017 by multiple routes. City Link Silver took over the Charles Street, St. Paul Street and 33rd Street part of the route, City Link Green took the Loch Raven Boulevard portion of the route, and LocalLink 53 took the Joppa Road, York Road and Osler Drive portion of the route in Towson.

== In popular culture ==
- In "When the Colts belonged to Baltimore" by William Gildea, the narrator describes the no. 3 bus as his favorite bus line because it passes Memorial Stadium.
- The narrator of Woodholme, by DeWayne Wickham, used the no. 3 bus to reach Memorial Stadium.
