= Route 47 (MTA Quickbus) =

Public bus route in Baltimore, Maryland, US

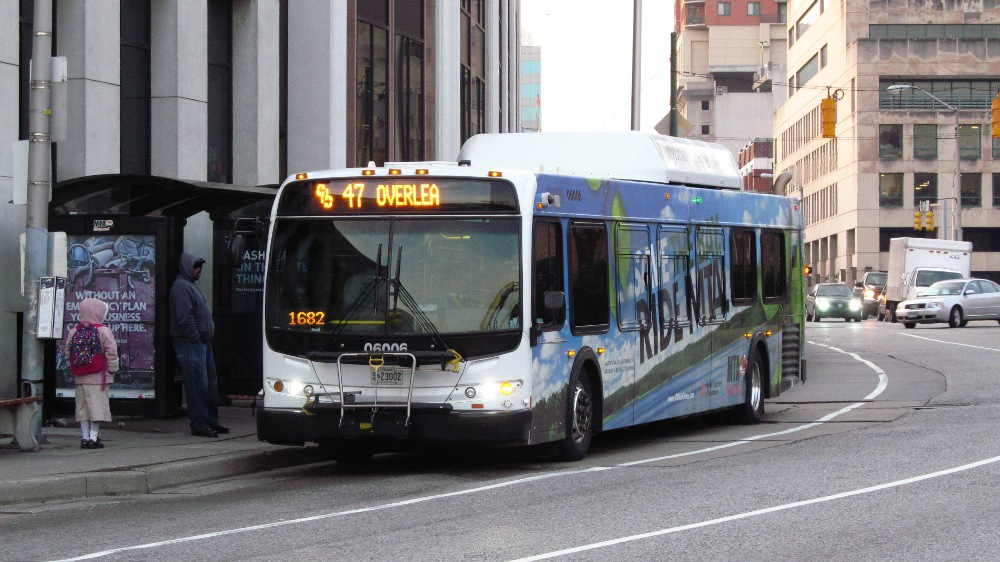

Overview
- System: Maryland Transit Administration
- Garage: Kirk; Bush
- Status: active
- Began service: 2010

Route
- Locale: Baltimore City Baltimore County
- Communities served: Rosemont; Poppleton; Belair-Edison; Gardenville; Fullerton
- Landmarks served: Kernan Hospital; Leakin Park; Lexington Market
- Other routes: 1, 3, 5, 7, 8, 10, 11, 13, 15, 16, 19, 20, 22, 23, 27, 35, 36, 38, 44, qb40, qb46, qb48, 51, 55, 58, 61, 64, 77, 91, 120, 150, 160

Service
- Level: Weekday peak only
- Frequency: Every 15 minutes
- Operates: 5:00 am to 6:00 pm

Route 47 is a limited stop bus route, identified as a "Quickbus", operated by the Maryland Transit Administration in Baltimore. The line currently runs from the Overlea Loop in Northeast Baltimore to Walbrook Junction, in West Baltimore. Service operates every 15 minutes during rush hour only. The main roads on which it operates include Poplar Grove Street, Saratoga Street, Gay Street, and Belair Road. Service operates Monday–Friday, every 15 minutes, from 5:30 a.m.– 9:30 a.m. and 2:30 p.m.- 6:30 p.m.

Unlike a local bus, the 47 does not stop at every bus stop along its route. Rather, its stops are limited to certain locations of importance, including transfer points to other bus lines, major landmarks, and other busy intersections selected by MTA. In all, there are 27 stops along the route.

== History ==
Route 47 started operated on August 28, 2010, becoming, along with Route 46, the third and fourth "QuickBus" services operated by MTA.

The no. 47 designation has previously been used for several other buses and streetcars in the Baltimore area. These included a streetcar route that operated between Mt. Washington and Pikesville, an express bus that operated between Glyndon, Cheswolde and downtown Baltimore, and a variety of routes that operate for the Baltimore City Public Schools.

== June 2011 ==
Reduce time span of service during the morning and evening peak periods to approximately two hours, with eight trips in each direction.

== See also ==
- Route 15 (All day local service)
