= LocalLink 95 (BaltimoreLink) =

Bus route operated by the Maryland Transit Administration

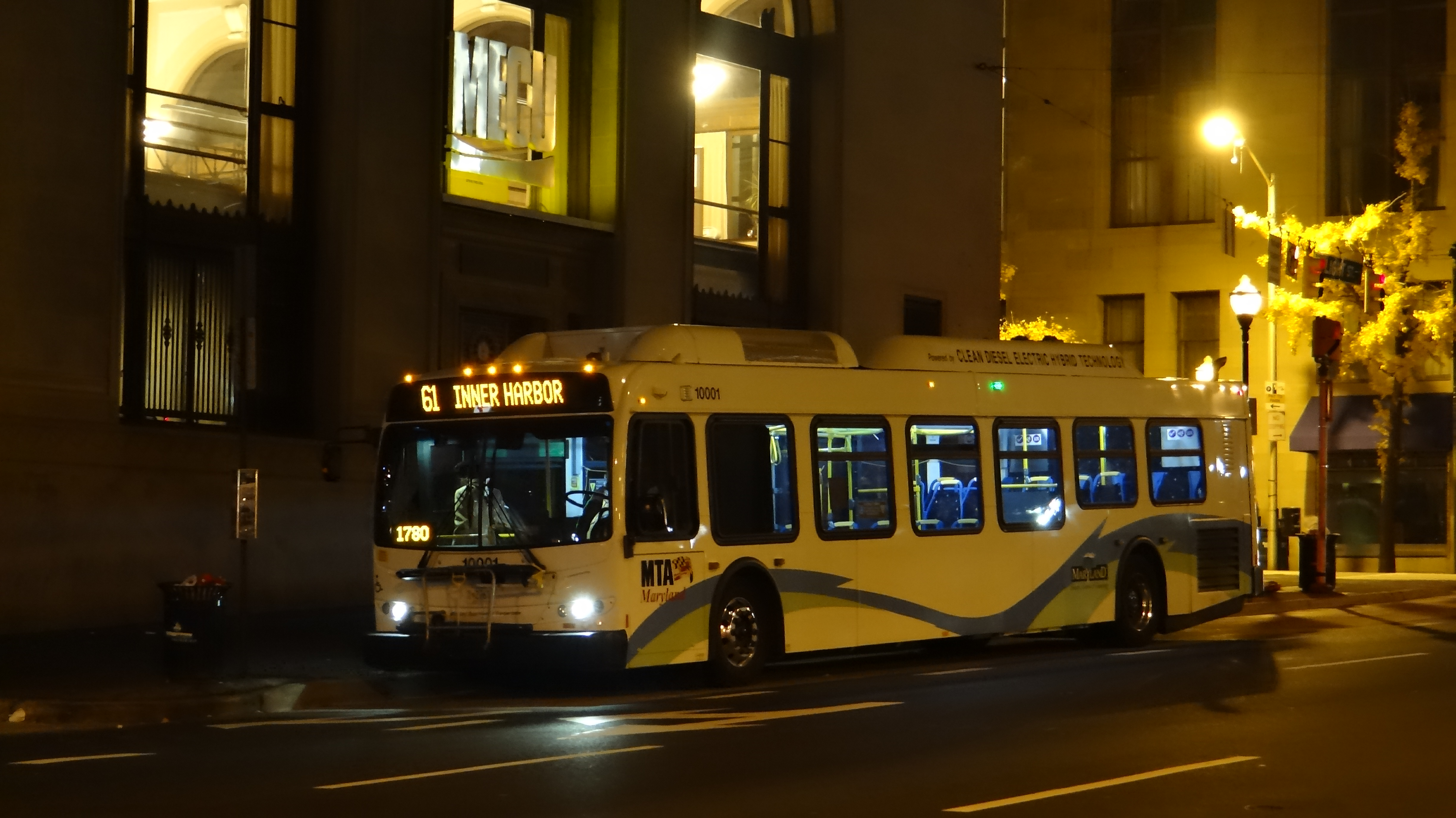

Overview
- System: Maryland Transit Administration
- Garage: Bush
- Status: active
- Began service: 1977
- Predecessors: Bus Route 6 (1959-1977); Bus Route 29 (1947-1959); No. 29 Streetcar (1908-1947); Lake Roland Elevated Railway (1892-1908)

Route
- Locale: Baltimore City
- Communities served: Homewood; Charles Village; Mt. Vernon
- Landmarks served: Johns Hopkins University; Penn Station
- Other routes: 1, 3, 5, 7, 8, 10, 11, 13, 15, 19, 20, 21, 22, 23, 27, 30, 33, 35, 36, qb40, 44, qb46, qb47, qb48, 58, 60, 64, 91, 120, 150, 160

Service
- Level: Weekdays only peak
- Frequency: Every 30 minutes
- Operates: 5:45 am to 7:40 pm

LocalLink 95 is a bus route operated by the Maryland Transit Administration in Baltimore. The line currently runs from the intersection of Roland Avenue and Lake Avenue in Roland Park south to the Inner Harbor via Roland Avenue, University Parkway, Charles Street (northbound trips) and St. Paul Street (southbound trips).

The bus route is the successor to Route 61 due to BaltimoreLink, and the 24 Lakeside (Lake Roland) and 29 Boulevard (now University Parkway) streetcar lines.

== History ==
Route 61 under this designation has served its route since 1977 until the renaming to Route 95 under BaltimoreLink. But several other bus and streetcar lines using different designations previously served the same route.

One other bus route in Baltimore transit history used the no. 61 designation, a downtown area parking lot line that operated 1946 to 1949.

The Baltimore, Hampden and Lake Roland Railroad, which was consolidated into the Lake Roland Elevated Railway in April 1892 and bought by the City and Suburban Railway in January 1895, reached Lake Roland in 1893. Its original route used the Guilford Avenue Elevated north from downtown Baltimore, and continued along Guilford Avenue, North Avenue, Howard Street, 23rd Street, Hampden Avenue, 24th Street, Sisson Street, Keswick Road, 34th Street, Elm Avenue, 40th Street, Roland Avenue, and private right-of-way to the lake. In 1895, the portion between 23rd Street and 40th Street was abandoned; the southern half over the Elevated was soon through-routed with the Gilmor Street Line, while the northern half was connected to the City and Suburban's Huntingdon Line. This line ended at the car house at Upland Road in Roland Park, and a Lakeside Line shuttle - numbered 11 by 1923 - connected the car house to Lake Roland. It was renumbered 28 on October 17, 1924, and 24 probably on November 24, 1929. When the Roland Park Line (10) was replaced with trackless trolleys on April 13, 1940, the Lakeside Line was extended south on Roland Avenue to the water tower just south of University Parkway. It was truncated to Lake Avenue on June 22, 1947, and discontinued on January 29, 1950.

The Boulevard Line, numbered 29, began operating on October 8, 1908. It ran from downtown north along the original Calvert Street Line (Calvert, Read, and Charles Streets, North Avenue, and St. Paul Street to 25th Street), continuing along St. Paul Street, University Parkway (then Boulevard), and Roland Avenue to the carhouse. The route was replaced by a bus (also 29) on June 22, 1947, which continued north on Roland Avenue to Lake Avenue, allowing the Lakeside Line to be truncated there.

This Route 29 bus was absorbed into Route 6 on January 11, 1959. Route 6, which also had a branch to East Monument Street, followed this routing for the next 18 years.

On June 14, 1977, this portion of Route 6 was again split off into four separate routes. A new Route 61 between Lake Avenue and downtown. Route 62 served East Monument Street (now served by Route 35). Routes 63 and 64 (now only Route 64) served the southern end of the route south of North Avenue.

Over the years, there have been attempts to improve ridership, which has always been very low except for students. Selected trips that operated to the Mount Washington Light Rail Stop between 1992 and 1995, running via Northern Parkway, Falls Road, and Kelly Avenue were discontinued due to low ridership. Weekend service was eliminated in 1993; a private company operated replacement service for a short time before giving it up.

In 2005, as part of the Greater Baltimore Bus Initiative, a comprehensive overhaul plan for the region's transit system, MTA proposed to eliminate Route 61. While the St. Paul Street corridor continues to be served by other buses, no plan was made to provide service on Roland Avenue.

The proposal drew a lot of protest. In 2006, MTA announced a new set of proposals that likewise, would include the discontinuation of Route 61, but with peak hour service being provided on a new branch of Route 11. This plan was delayed several times while Route 61 continued to operate unchanged. GBBI was canceled in 2007, but this plan was announced again later that year.

In February 2008, MTA announced that Route 61 would continue to operate, but during peak hours only. Ultimately, Route 61 remained as a peak-hour operation.

== Extension to Mount Washington ==
On July 5, 2011, service was extended to the Mount Washington loop to provide riders with a connection to the Light Rail and routes 27, 58, and 60.
