= LocalLink 29 (BaltimoreLink) =

Bus route operated by the Maryland Transit Administration

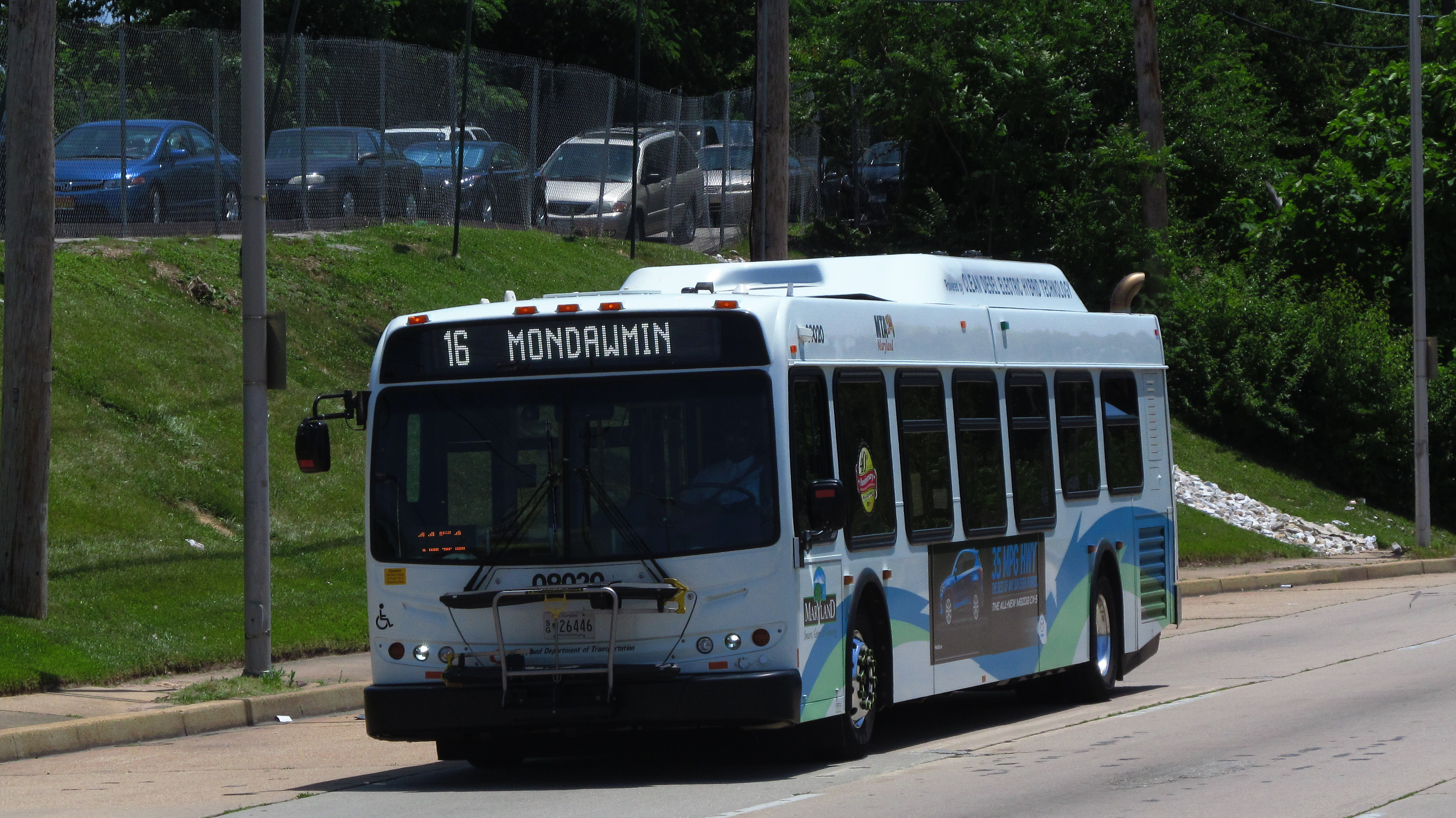

Overview
- System: Maryland Transit Administration
- Garage: Bush
- Status: active
- Began service: 2001
- Predecessors: Route 16; Bus Route 22 (south of Mondawmin)

Route
- Locale: Baltimore City
- Communities served: Rosemont
- Landmarks served: Coppin State College; St. Agnes Hospital
- Other routes: 1, 5, 7, 10, 13, 15, 17, 20, 21, 22, 23, 30, 35, 36, 38, qb40, qb46, qb47, 51, 52, 53, 54, 64, 91, 97

Service
- Level: Daily
- Frequency: Every 30 minutes Every 20 minutes (peak)
- Weekend frequency: Every 30-60 minutes
- Operates: 5:00 am to 12:00 am

LocalLink 29 is a bus route operated by the Maryland Transit Administration in Baltimore. The line currently runs from the Mondawmin Metro Subway Station in Northwest Baltimore to Brooklyn Homes in South Baltimore through the communities of Rosemont (serving Coppin State College) and the corridors of Hilton Street, Caton Avenue, and Patapsco Avenue. During peak hours, selected trips operate via Violetville Industrial Park.

== History ==
Route 29 was introduced in January 2001 as Route 16 when Route 22 was split. Service along its route started in 1971 as 22 EXTENDED.

Much of the current route of Route 16 historically was not served by a single transit route. Portions that were include North Avenue, which has been served by the no. 13 streetcar since 1890 and also the No. 31 streetcar, which later became the No. 19 streetcar (and is currently Bus Route 91); both these lines currently overlap. Bloomingdale Avenue and Poplar Grove Street were served by the Nos. 4 and 35 streetcars (currently Bus Route 15). Service on Fish House Road (where Patapsco Avenue is now located) between Annapolis Road and Brooklyn was provided by Short Line Routes.

The no. 16 designation has previously been used for several Baltimore area public transit routes, most notably a streetcar that operated from Reservoir Hill to Fells Point from 1893 to 1948, that operated as a bus line until 1956. Its route is currently served mostly by Bus Route 5. The no. 16 designation was also used for a bus route that operated from 1973 to 1989 between downtown Baltimore and BWI Airport, Odenton, and Ft. Meade, before being replaced by two express buses designated Routes 230 and 240. The current route is served by MTA Route 17 and Connect-a-Ride Route K. Another route designated no. 16 operated express service from 1993 to 1995 between the North Linthicum Light Rail Stop and Ft. Meade/NSA before being replaced by a private carrier.

In 2017, Route 16 was renamed as Route 29 under BaltimoreLink, with discontinued service to Violetville Industrial Park due to low ridership.

=== Origin ===
Route 22, which had been operating since 1947 along its current route, succeeding Route S, its parent route, had a very long route up until 2001 that in all served nearly ¾ the circumference of the city, and only selected trips operated along Route 16's route, with the remainder terminating at Mondawmin. Due to the length and confusion among riders, MTA decided that Route 16 service should be provided on a separate line.

When Route 16 started, rush hour service operated every 30 minutes, and service at all other times was provided hourly. Sunday service along the route, which had not been provided on Route 22, was introduced.

In 2005, as part of the Greater Baltimore Bus Initiative, MTA proposed not only to double the frequency, but to modify the route in the Rosemont area to serve the Poplar Grove corridor, leaving Route 51 as the only bus serving the part of Rosemont of Route 16's previous route. The original routing plan would have operated along west from Gwynns Falls Parkway to Bloomingdale Avenue, and would then follow the routing of Route 15 up to Edmondson Avenue, as well as eliminated the Violetville deviation. After riders complained that the new route would not serve Coppin State College, a slight change was made to this modification, in which North Avenue would be used rather than Gwynns Falls Parkway. Also, Violetville service remained.

On October 8, 2006, the midday and Saturday frequency of Route 16 was doubled. On February 17, 2009, the routing changes were implemented. The peak hour frequency was also doubled to one bus every 15 minutes.
