= LocalLink 67 (BaltimoreLink) =

Bus route operated by the Maryland Transit Administration

Route 64
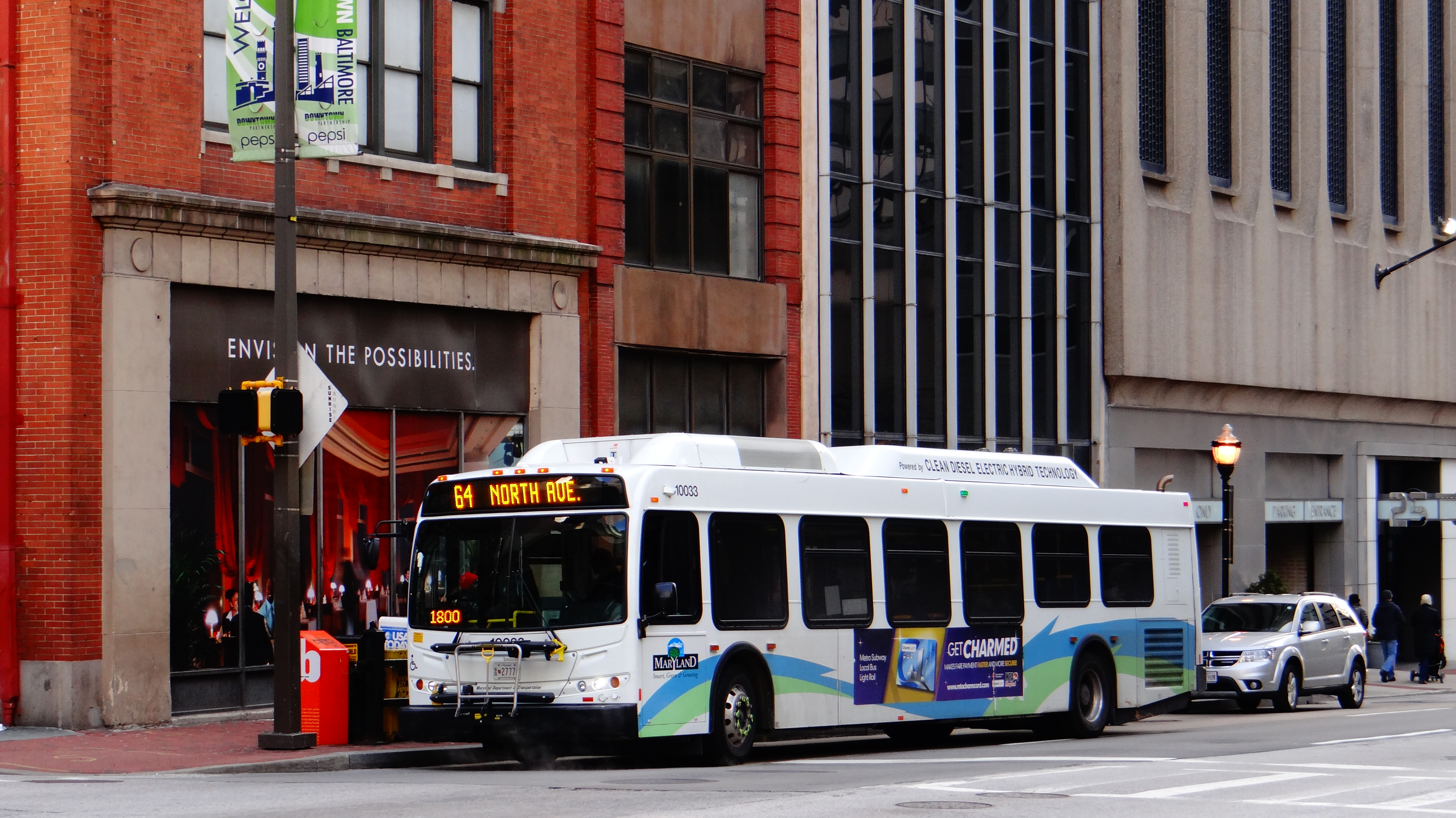

Overview
- System: Maryland Transit Administration
- Garage: Bush
- Status: active
- Began service: 1977
- Predecessors: No. 6 Streetcar (1892-1948); Route 6 Bus (1948-1977)

Route
- Locale: Baltimore City; Baltimore County
- Communities served: Mt. Vernon; Federal Hill; Port Covington; Brooklyn
- Landmarks served: Penn Station; Inner Harbor
- Other routes: 1, 3, 5, 7, 8, 10, 11, 13, 14, 15, 16, 19, 20, 21, 23, 27, 29, 30, 35, 36, qb40, qb46, qb47, qb48, 51, 91, 120, 150, 160

Service
- Level: Daily
- Frequency: Every 30 minutes Every 15-20 minutes (peak)
- Weekend frequency: Every 40-50 minutes
- Operates: 4:30 am to 1:30 am

Route 64 was a bus route operated by the Maryland Transit Administration in Baltimore and its suburbs. The line ran from the intersection of North Avenue and St. Paul Street to Curtis Bay, with selected trips to Energy Parkway and Riviera Beach. The line also served Federal Hill, Port Covington, and Brooklyn.

The bus route was the successor to the 6 Curtis Bay streetcar line.

== History ==
Route 64 started operating in 1977 after a line known as Route 6 was split into several other lines. Its route has a history of being served by streetcars.

The No. 6 Curtis Bay Streetcar started operating in 1892. In 1929, the route was extended east from downtown Baltimore to Patterson Park. The line was extended again in 1935 to Orangeville after absorbing the eastern portion of the No. 4 Streetcar Line (a service presently provided on the west side by bus route 15 and on the east side by bus route 35). In 1948, the Curtis Bay-East Monument Street line was converted to a bus.

In 1959, Bus Route 6 absorbed Bus Route 29, the line that had operated between Roland Park and downtown (a service now provided by Route 61). While all trips had operated from Curtis Bay, the line had two branches from downtown: one to the east along Monument Street, and one to the north to Roland Park. This alignment continued for the next 18 years.

In 1977, Route 6 was split into four new routes. A new Route 61 was formed that operated and still operates to this day from Roland Park to downtown. A new Route 62 operated from Monument Street to downtown. (Route 62 was extended to serve Armistead Gardens and Hollander Ridge and was eventually incorporated into Route 35). A new Route 63 was formed that operated from Riviera Beach to downtown. And Route 64 started operating from Curtis Bay to downtown, with branches serving Wagner's Point, Maryland Drydock, Davison Chemical, and various other places in the area. Routes 63 and 64 overlapped for much of the route within the city.

The Route 63 bus that was formed in 1977 was not the first. A new bus route designated Route X, the highest lettered route in Baltimore transit history, started operating in 1946. It was renamed to Route 63 in 1948. This route operated until 1951, when it was absorbed into Route 6.

Routes 63 and 64 that had been formed in 1977 continued to operate in this fashion until 1993, when changes started to be made.

In January 1993, Route 63 was modified to feed into the Patapsco Light Rail Stop rather than going to downtown Baltimore. Later the same year, when the light rail was extended further south, it was modified again to feed into the North Linthicum Light Rail Stop, and selected trips on Route 63 continued north to the Patapsco stop, replacing a branch of Route 64 that had served Linthicum. The Davison Chemical branch of Route 64 was eliminated due to low ridership, but Route 63 continued to pass the entrance to the plant.

In 1996, Routes 63 and 64 were combined, and selected Route 64 trips were extended to Riviera Beach and Energy Parkway. No replacement service was provided for the portion of Route 63 in the Linthicum area, though many parts of the route are within a close walk of the light rail. Route 64 from this day on has provided all service for the corridor.

In 2003, Route 64 was shortened to Curtis Bay. Service between Curtis Bay and Wagner's Point was provided on a new Route 65, which operated between the Patapsco Light Rail Stop and Wagner's Point. This change was made due to a temporary road closure. But Route 65 was eliminated in 2005 as part of the Greater Baltimore Bus Initiative due to low ridership, and currently, no bus service operates to this area. Only 20 daily riders were using the service to reach Wagner's Point, requiring a taxpayer subsidy of nearly $20 each.

Also in 2005, as part of GBBI, it was proposed that Route 64 would be combined with a portion of Route 27, and extended north to Mt. Washington through Hampden. In addition, Riviera Beach trips would have been shortened to Energy Parkway. These changes were not implemented, and in 2007, GBBI was canceled.

In 2008, it was proposed that Riviera Beach trips would be shortened to Energy Parkway. But this change was never implemented, and the line continued to serve Riviera Beach nine times daily.
