= LocalLink 73 (BaltimoreLink) =

Bus route in Baltimore, Maryland and its suburbs

Route 51
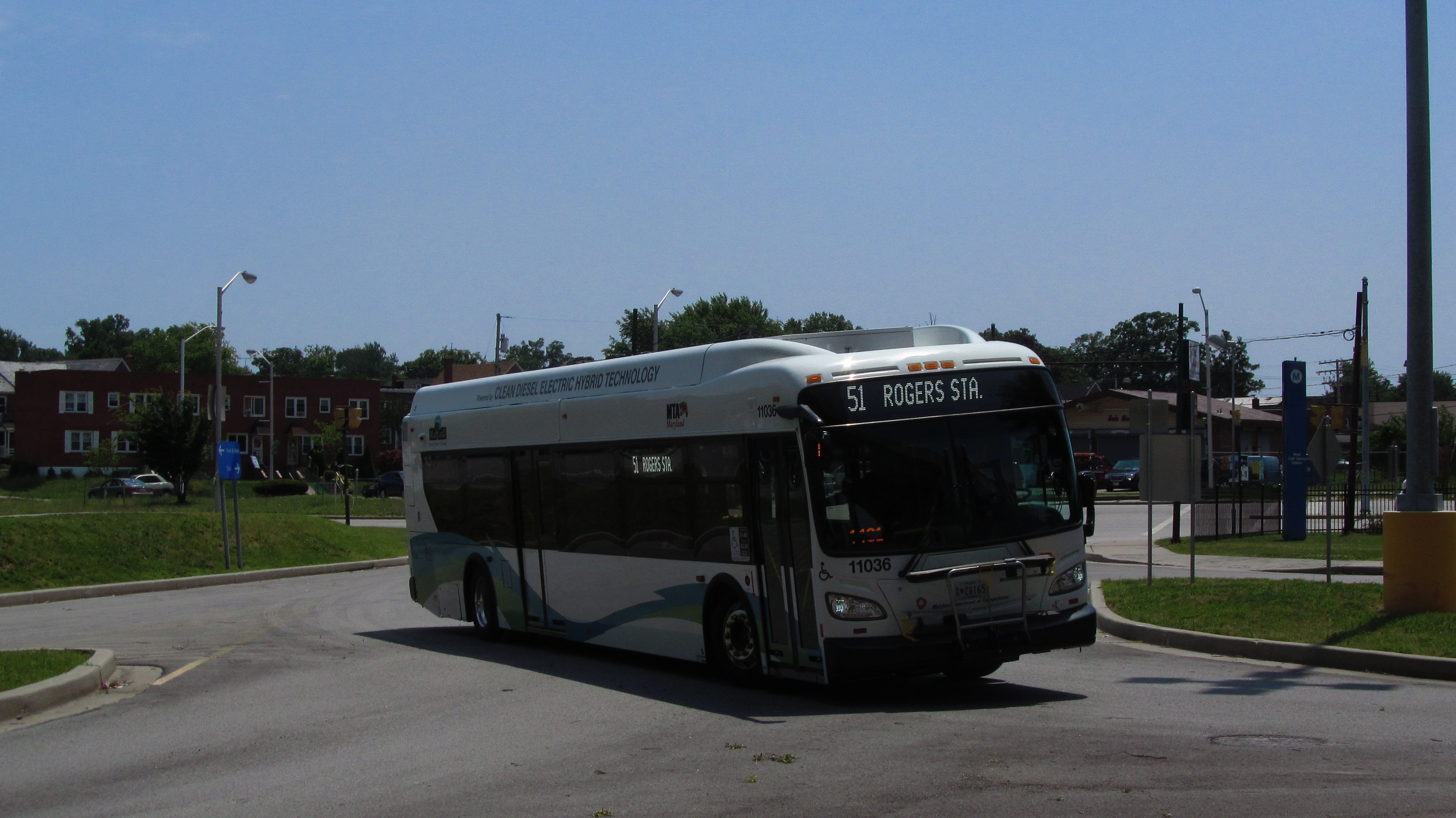

Overview
- System: Maryland Transit Administration
- Garage: Bush; Northwest
- Status: active
- Began service: 1948
- Predecessors: Bus Route D

Route
- Locale: Baltimore City; Baltimore County
- Communities served: Arlington; Ashburton; Mondawmin; Rosemont; Westport; Cherry Hill; Brooklyn; Mt. Winans; Baltimore Highlands
- Landmarks served: Druid Hill Park; Johns Hopkins University
- Other routes: 1, 5, 7, 10, 13, 14, 15, 16, 17, 20, 21, 22, 23, 27, 29, 30, 33, 35, 36, 38, qb40, 44, qb46, qb47, 52, 53, 54, 57, 64, 67, 77, 91, 97

Service
- Level: Daily
- Frequency: Every 20 minutes Every 15 minutes (peak)
- Weekend frequency: Every 30-36 minutes
- Operates: 4:30 am to 1:30 am

Route 51 is a bus route operated by the Maryland Transit Administration in Baltimore and its suburbs. The line currently runs from the Rogers Avenue Metro Subway Station to the Patapsco Light Rail Stop, serving the communities of Arlington, Ashburton, Mondawmin, Rosemont, Baltimore, Cherry Hill, and Mt. Winans, and the suburb of Baltimore Highlands.

== History ==
Route 51 mostly is the successor to Bus Route D, which was operated by Auxiliary Bus Lines from 1923 to 1948 along a portion of the current route, mostly along Bentalou and Monroe Streets. Auxiliary Bus Lines also operated a separate route along Hollins Ferry Road in Baltimore Highlands. The use of the no. 51 designation for the route began in 1948.

In 1984, in conjunction with the opening of the Baltimore Metro Subway, the route was modified to serve three stations, with its northern terminus extended from Belvedere and Groveland Avenues to Rogers Avenue Station. The line also had selected trips added to Cherry Hill.

In 2001, Route 51 was combined with Route 30, which had operated since 1993, and all trips, except for those operating to Cherry Hill, were extended to the Patapsco Light Rail Stop via Hollins Ferry Road through Mt. Winans and Baltimore Highlands. Cherry Hill trips were also extended to Patapsco along Hanover Street and Patapsco Avenue.

In 2005, as part of the Greater Baltimore Bus Initiative, MTA initially proposed to eliminate the Cherry Hill branch of Route 51 and increase the level of service to Mt. Winans. This proposal was not implemented in 2005, but in 2006, it was modified. Another plan was introduced to extend the route north to the Reisterstown Plaza Metro Subway Station to replace a portion of Route 27, which was proposed for elimination, and eliminate some of the deviations into other Metro stations in order to keep the operating time the same.

The elimination of Cherry Hill trips was scrapped due to public outcry, and all changes to this route are yet to be implemented.

In 2014, the route in southwest Baltimore was modified to serve the Horseshoe Casino on Russell Street, operating via Russell, Haines, Warner, Bayard and Wicomico Streets.
