= Route 30 (MTA Maryland) =

Former public bus route in Baltimore, US

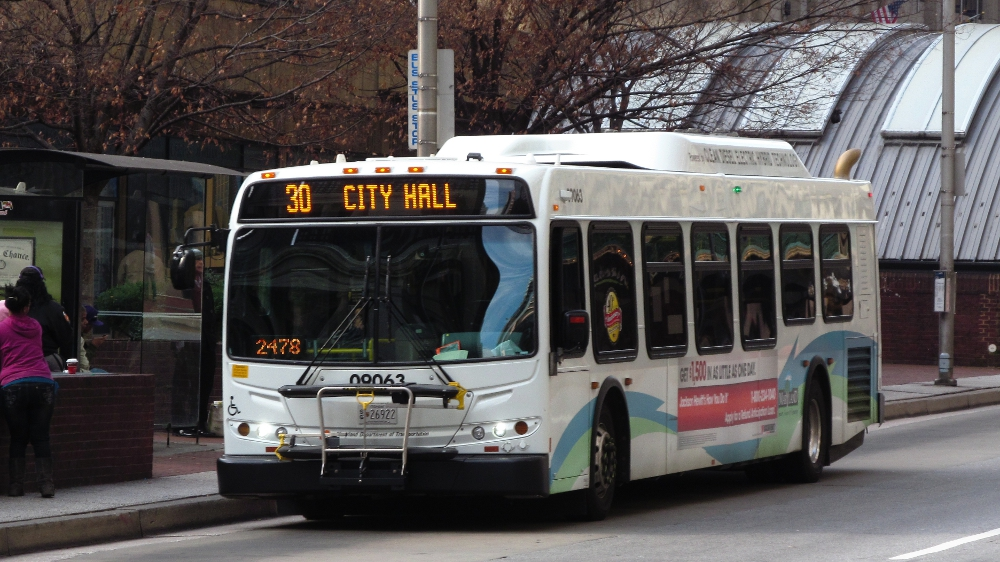

Overview
- System: Maryland Transit Administration
- Garage: Eastern; Bush
- Status: Discontinued
- Began service: 2010
- Ended service: 2015
- Predecessors: Bus Route 6 & Bus Route 10 (East(February 2015)) Bus Route 20 West(February 2015) Bus Routes 26 & 31

Route
- Locale: Baltimore City
- Communities served: Patterson Park; Little Italy; Shipley Hill; St. Joseph's; Uplands; Greektown
- Landmarks served: Grace Medical Center; Lexington Market; Baltimore Arena; Phoenix Shot Tower
- Other routes: 1, 3, 5, 7, 8, 10, 11, 13, 15, 16, 19, 20, 21, 22, 23, 27, 35, 36, 38 qb40, 44, qb46, qb48, 50, 51, 61, 64, 91, 120, 150, 160

Service
- Level: Weekdays Only
- Frequency: Every 22 minutes Every 15 minutes (peak)
- Operates: 5:15 am to 6:30 pm

Route 30 was a bus route operated by the Maryland Transit Administration in Baltimore. The line ran from Edmondson Village in west Baltimore to Bayview Medical Center in southeast Baltimore during rush hour and City Hall during the midday until 20 February 2015.

Route 30 was known as Route 6 until it was renamed and rerouted to Bayview Medical Center in August 2010.

The line did not provide any unique service. Rather, it supplemented service to two other area bus routes: Routes 10 and 20 at identical frequencies with the schedules evenly coordinated. It supplemented Route 10 along the Eastern Avenue corridor during peak hours.

== History ==
Route 6, one of the predecessors to Route 30

Route 6 was initially proposed late in 2007 to begin in early 2008, to supplement both Route 5 and Route 20, and at the time, no changes were proposed to either routes. On February 17, 2008, Route 6 began service. The schedule of Route 5 was adjusted in order to coordinate the schedule.

On August 31, 2009, the Route 6 began Midday service between Edmondson Village and City Hall. The schedule of the Route 20 was adjusted in order to coordinate the schedule. During the midday the route 6 was scheduled to operate every 22 minutes, yet in reality it was common to see two 30s at a time.

On August 29, 2010, the Route 6 was discontinued. Two new routes were created in its place: Route 30, and a new QuickBus route 46. The 30 continued to serve the former 6's western routing, to Edmondson Village via W. Baltimore St. (supplementing the 20 bus), while adding service in East Baltimore by mimicking the 10 bus east of Charles Center to its layover on the Johns Hopkins Bayview Medical Campus (the 10 bus bypasses Bayview, continuing SE toward Dundalk). Only during rush periods does the 30 go to Bayview. During the midday it only serves Edmondson Village - City Hall, the exact midday routing of the former 6 bus. The qb46 bus retained the former 6 bus's Cedonia - Downtown routing while adding service along the 10 bus's routing to Frederick Rd./Paradise Av. to provide much needed relief for the 10. Unlike the former 6, which was local, the qb46 is limited stop, and allows passengers to get to Cedonia and Catonsville much faster than the 5, 6, and 10 buses could. When the 30 and 46 buses were proposed, the community tried hard to get MTA to make the 30 bus a QuickBus, and to make both buses full-time, but these were not the wishes of the MTA. In February 2015 as part of a Bus Network Improvement Project the 30 was discontinued and all West side peak day service transferred to the 20.
