= Highlandtown Line =

The following streetcar lines in Baltimore were called the Highlandtown Line:

- Highlandtown Line (Eastern Avenue), electrified in 1893 as a streetcar route between Roland Park and Point Breeze, converted in 1959 to the Route 10 (MTA Maryland) bus route
- Highlandtown Line (Fairmount Avenue), a streetcar established in 1897 and converted in 1942 to bus route P, now served by Route 20, 23, and 40 buses
