= LocalLink 54 (BaltimoreLink) =

Bus route operated by the Maryland Transit Administration

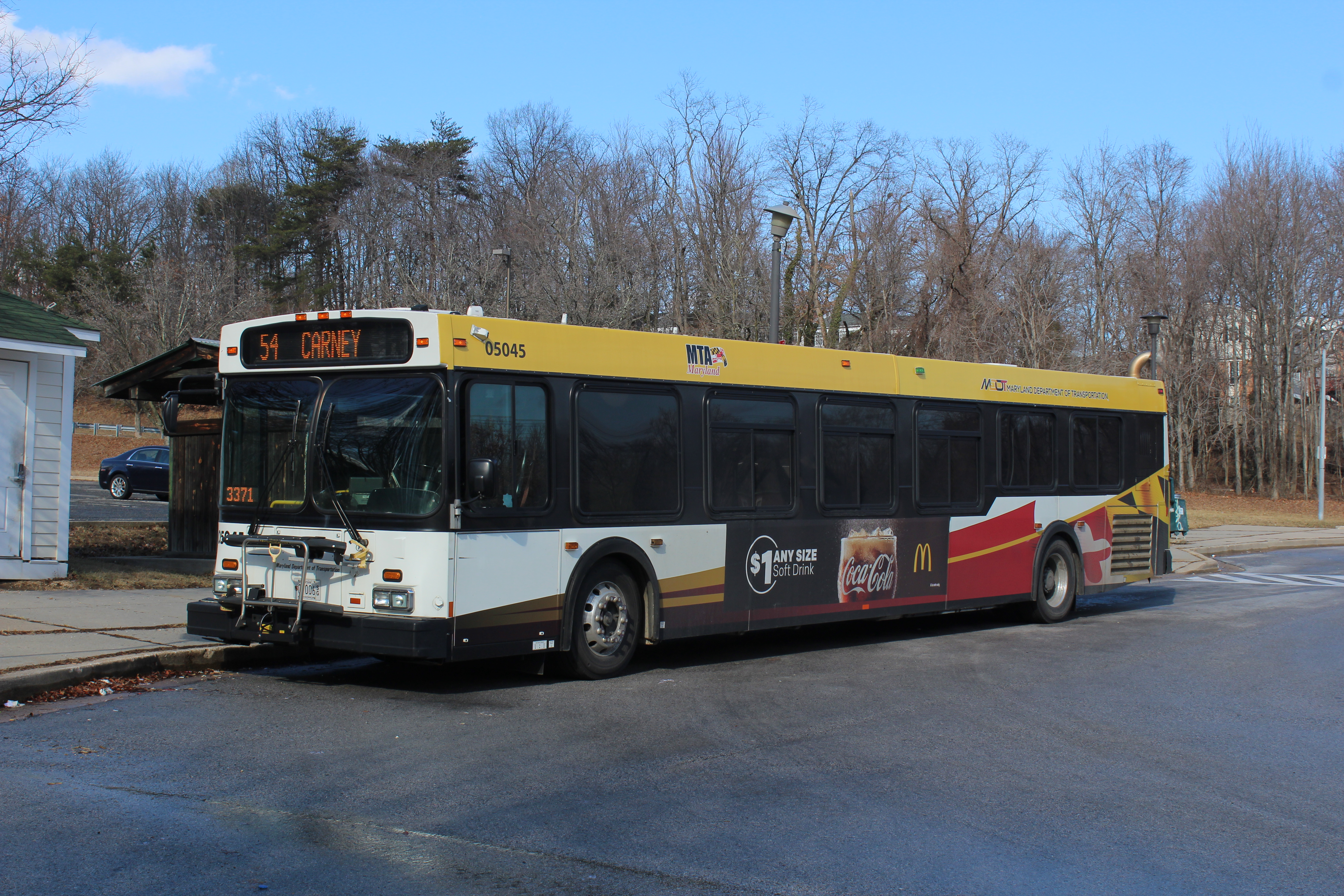

Overview
- System: Maryland Transit Administration
- Garage: Kirk
- Status: active
- Began service: 1956
- Predecessors: No. 19 Streetcar; No. 53 Bus; Route 19

Route
- Locale: Baltimore City; Baltimore County
- Communities served: Parkville; Hamilton
- Landmarks served: Northern High School; Montebello State Hospital
- Other routes: 1, 3, 5, 6, 7, 8, 10, 11, 13, 15, 20, 21, 22, 23, 27, 33, 35, 36, qb40, 44, qb46, qb47, qb48, 55, 58, 61, 64, 91, 120, 150, 160

Service
- Level: Daily
- Frequency: Every 15 minutes Every 10 minutes (peak)
- Weekend frequency: Every 15-30 minutes
- Operates: 4:00 am to 1:30 am

LocalLink 54 is a bus route operated by the Maryland Transit Administration in Baltimore and its suburbs. The route was formerly known as Route 19 prior to 2017. The line currently runs from the State Center Metro Subway Station to the intersection of Harford Road and Northern Parkway. From there it splits into two branches. About one half of buses continue operating along Harford Road to the Carney Park-and-Ride just north of the I-695 interchange, and the other half to the intersection of Goucher Boulevard and Taylor Avenue in Towson via Northern, McLean Boulevard, Hillsway, and Taylor. The line serves the communities of Montebello, Hamilton, and Parkville.

The bus route is the successor to the 19 Harford Avenue streetcar line.

== History ==
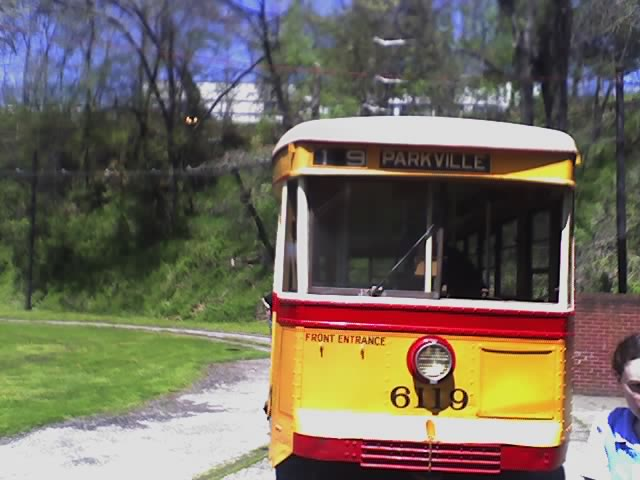
A historic No. 19 streetcar at the Baltimore Streetcar Museum

Route 19 was electrified as a streetcar along Harford Road in 1894. The line terminated in the north in Parkville and did not serve Carney. Service between Parkville and Carney was provided by Bus Route R from 1936 to 1948, and by Bus Route 53 from 1948 to 1956. The no. 19 line started providing service to Carney when it was converted to a bus in 1956.

In 1952, it was combined with the no. 31 streetcar, and extended to serve the corridor of Garrison Boulevard in West Baltimore. In 1956, the operation was converted to rubber tire buses.

Over the next few decades, the line was expanded. The route was extended along Belvedere Avenue to Sinai Hospital and north to the Carney Park-and-Ride, and branches were formed to Northern Parkway and McLean Boulevard, Walther Avenue, Joppa Heights, and the Hickey School. Also, express trips operated via I-95.

In 1987, Route 19 was split into two lines in order to improve schedule adherence on both sides of town. The new Route 19 ran from State Center north of downtown Baltimore, and the line served the Harford Road corridor. The new Route 91 operated from Sinai Hospital to City Hall, serving the western half of this route.

During the 1990s, the following changes were made to Route 19:

- The McLean branch was extended to Goucher & Taylor, overlapping with a portion of Route 55. It was also made into a full-time service.
- The Walther Avenue branch was discontinued.
- Express trips via I-95 were discontinued.

== Greater Baltimore Bus Initiative ==
In 2005, as part of the Greater Baltimore Bus Initiative, a comprehensive overhaul plan for the region's transit system, MTA first proposed to eliminate the Joppa Heights and Hickey School branches. No changes to this line were implemented along with Phase I in 2005.

In 2006, a two revised plans were introduced. The first was to likewise shorten the line to Lexington Market. But a new revised plan was introduced later in 2006 in which the line would be split into two separate lines. One line, which would have retained the no. 19 designation, would have continued to operate from Carney to State Center, with a minor routing change in the downtown area, and would have operated every 30 minutes at most times. The other would have been known as Route 37, and would have operated from Goucher & Taylor to Cherry Hill via the current route downtown, then via the route of Route 27 the remainder of the way. These two lines would operate on an alternating basis with coordinated schedules between Northern & Harford and downtown Baltimore.

These changes were not implemented, and GBBI was canceled in 2007. But the Joppa Heights and Hickey School branches were later eliminated in 2009, with no other changes to the route.

== Route 19A ==
In 1973, a new Route 19A was introduced that also originated at the Carney Park-and-Ride, and operated to Downtown Baltimore via a different route. It was a replacement for a route previously provided by the defunct McMahon Services. The line provided one morning trip between Carney and downtown, and one evening trip from downtown to Carney. It operated to points on Harford Road north of the Park-and-Ride lot, serving the Cub Hill area, and then followed Old Harford Road and shorter sections of other thoroughfares in Parkville and Towson not served by other bus service prior to reaching Charles Street in the Rodgers Forge area. From there, it continued directly downtown. The line was renamed Route 105 in 2000.,

In October 2005, Route 105 was discontinued due to its low ridership. No replacement service was formed. Riders within a close walk of other routes were advised to use those.

== In popular culture ==
- A Route 19 bus is shown in the 2004 film A Dirty Shame
