= CityLink Orange (BaltimoreLink) =

Bus route operated by the Maryland Transit Administration

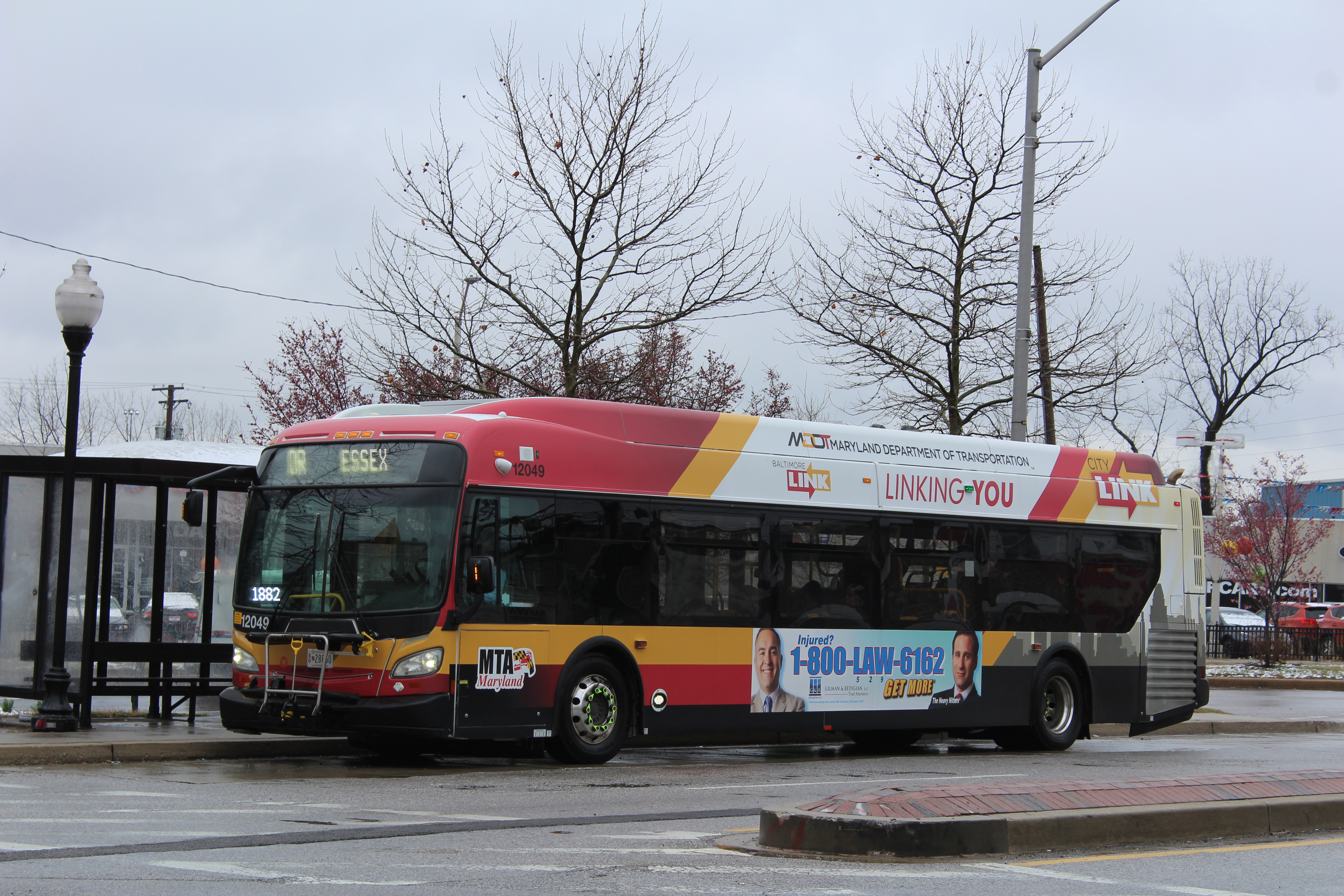
- CityLink Orange bus on Eastern Avenue

Overview
- System: MTA BaltimoreLink
- Garage: Eastern; Bush
- Status: active
- Began service: 1950
- Predecessors: Nos. 14 and 23 Streetcars; Bus Route

Route
- Locale: Baltimore City; Baltimore County
- Communities served: Edmondson Village; Allendale; Rognel Heights; Wildwood; Rosemont; Poppleton; Essex; Middle River
- Landmarks served: West Baltimore MARC Station; Lexington Market; Phoenix Shot Tower; Johns Hopkins Hospital; Patterson Park; Johns Hopkins Bayview Medical Center; Eastpoint Mall
- Other routes: 1, 3, 4, 5, 6, 7, 8, 10, 11, 13, 15, 16, 19, 20, 21, 22, 24, 27, 35, 36, 38, qb40, qb46, qb47, qb48, 51, 55, 61, 64, 77, 91, 99, 120, 150, 160

Service
- Level: Daily
- Frequency: Every 15 minutes Every 15 minutes (peak)
- Weekend frequency: Every 30-35 minutes
- Operates: 24 Hours a Day

CityLink Orange (abbreviated OR) is a bus route operated by the Maryland Transit Administration in Baltimore and its suburbs. The line currently runs from the Wal-Mart parking lot in Catonsville, Maryland east through downtown Baltimore to the Fox Ridge community in Essex, serving the corridors of Edmondson Avenue on the west side and Eastern Avenue on the east, and the communities of Edmondson Village, Allendale, Rosemont, Patterson Park, and Eastpoint, and is one of the most heavily used bus routes operated by the MTA.

The bus route is the successor to the 14 Ellicott City, 23 Back and Middle Rivers, and East Fayette Street streetcar lines.

== History ==
Route 23 began its service as an electrified rail and streetcar line between Middle River and downtown Baltimore in 1897 along much of the same route as today. The streetcar operated until 1942, until the line was converted into a rubber-tire bus service. During these years, Route 23 did not serve the west side of town at all. The western portion of today's route was primarily served by the no. 14 streetcar (no relationship to today's Route 14 that operates between Baltimore and Annapolis). Service was also provided through Essex and Middle River on the Back River Trolley.

In 1942, the no. 23 streetcar service was discontinued. It was then replaced by Bus Route P, which operated until 1950.

The no. 23 designation returned to Eastern Avenue on January 22, 1950. But westside service on this line did not begin until 1954, when Route 23 absorbed part of the route of the former Route 14, which had operated between Ellicott City and downtown Baltimore. Route 23 was extended west to Catonsville along the US 40 and the Edmondson Avenue corridor, serving Edmondson Village. At that time, the full route of Route 23 ran from Edmondson Village to Middle River.

Over the years, a series of selected trips on each side of Route 23 were added. The communities served by these branches were:

West side

- Social Security (service was discontinued during first phase of the GBBI, and is available on Route 40)
- US-40 and Rolling Road (main western terminus - now the parking lot of Catonsville Wal-Mart, formerly the Montgomery Ward shopping center, though at times, the layover was on Geipe Road on the other side of Rolling Road)
- Wildwood Parkway (currently served by selected trips)

East side

- Bayview Medical Center (currently served on all trips)
- Fox Ridge (current eastern terminus on all trips)
- Hawthorne (discontinued during first phase of GBBI)
- Oliver Beach (replaced by Route 160)
- Pulaski Industrial Park (replaced by Route 24 during first phase of GBBI)
- Victory Villa (served by Route 24 since 1993, exclusively by Route 24 after first phase of GBBI, and currently by Route 4)
- Wilson Point (discontinued during first phase of GBBI)

The Hawthorne, Wilson Point, and Victory Villa services were incorporations of the defunct Rosedale Passenger Lines, which provided shuttle services to Route 23.

Over the years, Route 23 was heavily criticized. Riders complained of overcrowded buses, that the route was slow and unreliable, and that service to certain communities was sparsely provided.

MTA was able to address some of these concerns. During the 1990s, additional trips were added on certain heavily used branches. In addition, Oliver Beach service, which operated to the farthest point from downtown, was moved to the express Route 160 for faster service, and selected Route 160 trips operated from Fox Ridge. In 1993, Route 24 was also modified to provide additional midday and weekend service to Victory Villa, from which riders could transfer to Route 23 to travel downtown.

In 2005, as part of the Greater Baltimore Bus Initiative, a comprehensive overhaul for the region's transit system, Route 23 faced numerous changes.

Initially, it was planned that the line would operate from Catonsville to Fox Ridge on all trips, with all other branches eliminated or replaced by other lines. Riders on the Middle River and Victory Villa branches were directed to transfer to/from Route 24, and all other riders were expected to walk to Eastern or Edmondson Avenues. However, after public outcry, the Wildwood branch was retained.

The line also saw routing changes in the downtown area, and in East Baltimore. The route downtown was shifted from Saratoga Street to Fayette and Baltimore Streets, depending on the direction of travel, and in East Baltimore, service was shifted from Grundy/Haven Streets to Bayview Boulevard in order to serve Johns Hopkins Bayview Medical Center.

In addition, the line's frequency was cut virtually in half at most times. Rush hour service, which had operated every 7–8 minutes, was reduced to one bus every 15 minutes. Midday service, which had operated every 10–12 minutes, was reduced to one bus every 15 minutes. Saturday service was reduced from 15 to 30 minutes, and Sunday service from 30 minutes to hourly.

The cost savings generated from the reduction in service was used to operate a new, limited-stop service known as Route 40 (now "QuickBus"). The line, which overlaps on much of the route, but serves the Security Boulevard corridor rather than Catonsville, provides limited-stop service for faster travel. MTA believed that operating such a service would absorb much of Route 23's ridership while improving bus service over the corridor.

The overhaul of Route 23, which took effect on October 23, 2005, was not met pleasantly by riders. Many complained about the reduction in service while Route 40 did not stop near their streets, and did not meet their needs in any way. Also, some complained about routing changes. Most notably, businesses along Saratoga Street in downtown Baltimore reported a massive loss in customers who waited for buses near their shops.

MTA responded to complaints about the Saratoga Street losses. On February 26, 2006, the no. 23 was once again modified to serve the small businesses on Saratoga Street while retaining part of its new route on the Fayette/Baltimore Street corridor.

In August 2026, construction began to install bus lanes along the route of the proposed Red Line to improve service on the CityLink Orange, CityLink Blue, and QuickLink 40 routes.

== In popular culture ==
Detective Jimmy McNulty rides the 23 Edmondson Village bus to a crime scene in season 5 episode 2 of The Wire.
