= LocalLink 78 (BaltimoreLink) =

Bus route in Baltimore, Maryland and its suburbs

Overview
- System: Maryland Transit Administration
- Garage: Eastern (until Feb. 2015); Bush
- Status: active
- Began service: 1948

Route
- Locale: Baltimore City; Baltimore County
- Communities served: Westview Park; Edmondson Village
- Landmarks served: Westview Mall; Grace Medical Center
- Other routes: 1, 3, 5, 6, 7, 8, 10, 11, 13, 15, 16, 19, 21, 22, 23, 26, 27, 31, 35, 36, qb40, 44, qb46, qb48, 51, 57, 61, 64, 77, 91, 99 (on Security Blvd.), 120, 150, 160

Service
- Level: Daily
- Frequency: Every 15-20 minutes (Weekdays and Saturdays); Every 30 minutes(Sundays)

LocalLink 78, formerly Route 20 is a bus route operated by the Maryland Transit Administration in Baltimore and its suburbs. The line currently runs from Security Square Mall east through downtown Baltimore to Baltimore City Hall. The main roads on which the line operates are Old Frederick Road, Baltimore Street, Fayette Street, and Boston Street. The line serves the communities of Westview, Edmondson Village.

The bus route is the successor to the 15 West Baltimore Street, 20 Point Breeze, and Fairmount Avenue streetcar lines; the West Baltimore Street Line was the third streetcar line in Baltimore.

== History ==
In 1899, the No. 15 streetcar started operating along the western portion of this route as far west as Franklintown Road. Parts of the eastern portion were served by the nos. 23 and 26 streetcars during the streetcar era. Several Baltimore streetcars held the no. 20 designation. These included one that operated along Orleans Street from 1894 to 1929 before being absorbed into the No. 6 Streetcar (where service is currently provided by bus route 35), the West Arlington Jerkwater which operated briefly in 1930 (where service is currently provided by bus route 44), the Dundalk Short Line, which operated from 1930 to 1936, and the Point Breeze streetcar/bus, which operated from 1940 to 1948, which was reduced to a shuttle in 1948 before being absorbed by other services.

The current Route 20 on Baltimore Street started operating in 1948. In that year, the line absorbed Bus Route N, which had operated since 1932 when no. 15 streetcar service on West Baltimore Street was discontinued.

The line saw later expansions on the west side while communities developed in Edmondson Village, Westview, and Woodlawn, and was eventually extended to Rolling Road and Security Boulevard. The layover point was then moved across the street to Security Square Mall. On the east side, the line was extended to Dundalk Community College (now the Community College of Baltimore County Dundalk campus) and Dundalk Marine Terminal.

In October 2005, as part of the Greater Baltimore Bus Initiative, a comprehensive overhaul plan, Route 20 underwent the following changes:

- All trips on the west side, including all short turns at Hilton Street and Franklin Street, were extended to Security Square Mall. The Social Security branch was discontinued.
- All trips on the east side were extended to CCBC Dundalk, with the exception of selected weekday trips to Dundalk Marine Terminal. All other branches and short turns were eliminated, but in February of the following year, the short turns at Dundalk and Center Place were reintroduced on weekdays in order to improve schedule adherence.
- Routing in East Baltimore shifted two blocks north from Baltimore Street to Fayette Street. As this new route overlapped with the new Route 40 and existing Route 23 that had long operated on the same street, it allowed the schedules of the lines to be coordinated and evenly spaced on one of the peak portions of the route where ridership demand is high while keeping operating costs down.
- A plan to shift routing in West Baltimore from Old Frederick Road to Edmondson Avenue was abandoned as riders in this area did not feel safe walking a few extra blocks.

On 22 February 2015, service was cut to run between Security Square Mall and City Hall, with short turns at Edmonsdon Village as part of the first phase implementation of the Bus Network Improvement Project. Service on the eastern portion of the route was picked up by the new Route 31 for trips to Dundalk and by new Route 26 with expanded service to Dundalk Marine Terminal and the Amazon Warehouse.

In 2017, as a part of the BaltimoreLink system redesign, Route 20 became LocalLink 78.

== In popular culture ==
In Every Secret Thing By Laura Lippman, the narrator describes her plans to take the bus to St. Agnes Lane near U.S. 40, where Route 20 operates.

== See also ==
- Route 30 (supplemental service)
