= CityLink Purple (BaltimoreLink) =

Bus route operated by the Maryland Transit Administration

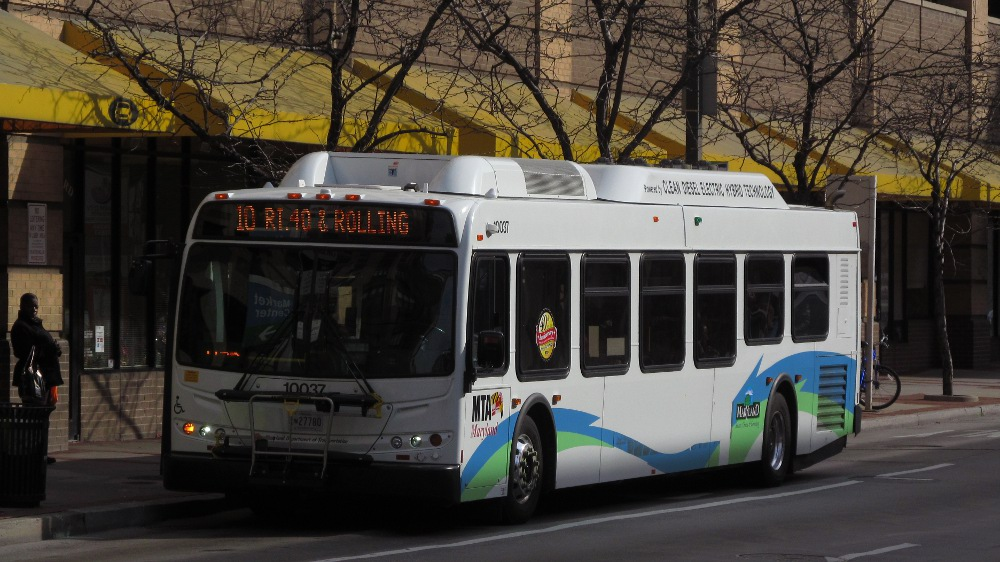

Overview
- System: MTA BaltimoreLink
- Garage: Eastern; Bush
- Status: Active
- Began service: 1959
- Predecessors: West side: No. 8 Streetcar, Bus Routes 2, 8 East side: No. 10 Streetcar

Route
- Locale: Baltimore City; Baltimore County
- Communities served: Yale Heights; Irvington; Little Italy; Fells Point; Highlandtown
- Landmarks served: B&O Railroad Museum; Convention Center; Harborplace; National Aquarium; Patterson Park
- Other routes: 1, 3, 4, 5, 7, 8, 11, 13, 15, 16, 19, 20, 21, 22, 23, 27, 30, 35, 36, qb40, qb46, qb48, 51, 61, 64, 77, 91, 99, 120, 150, 160

Service
- Level: Daily
- Frequency: Every 15 minutes Every 15 minutes (peak)
- Weekend frequency: Every 15-30 minutes
- Operates: 24 hours a day

CityLink Purple (abbreviated PR) is a bus route operated by the Maryland Transit Administration in Baltimore and its suburbs. The line currently runs from the Wal-Mart parking lot in Catonsville to Bullneck Road/Turner's Station Dundalk (the destination sign found on buses) mostly along the corridors of Frederick Road on the west side and Eastern Avenue on the east side, serving the communities of Yale Heights, Pigtown, downtown Baltimore, Fells Point, and Highlandtown.

The bus route is the successor to the 8 Catonsville, 10 Highlandtown, and 26 Sparrows Point streetcar lines.

== History ==
Route 10 was electrified in 1893 as a streetcar route between Roland Park and Point Breeze. Between Roland Park and downtown Baltimore, the route was similar to that of the current Route 27. There were also branches to Union Avenue and Sweet Air industrial parks. From downtown to Point Breeze, routing was similar to that of today's route, with slight variations in the streets on which the trolleys operated.

In 1940, Route 10 was shortened to Highlandtown, and service to Point Breeze was provided on a new Route 20 shuttle. Though today's Route 20 does serve the Dundalk area, the no. 20 Point Breeze shuttle was an unrelated service. The origin of the current Route 20 was as a service along Baltimore Street.

In 1959, Route 10 was converted to a rubber tire bus operation. Service was extended west to Pimlico and east to Sparrows Point after being combined with Route 26, which started operation in 1926 as a separate streetcar line, before its conversion to a shorter shuttle streetcar in 1950, with riders on other parts of the line being diverted to Route 10. Route 26 ended its operation in 1959, when a branch of Route 10 to Sparrows Point was added.

In 1982, Route 10 was split into two routes. The Route 10 designation was used for a line that ran from State Center (the future location of the State Center Metro Subway Station to the Dundalk area. A new Route 27 was formed that back then operated from Pimlico to Albemarle Street, serving the northern portion of this route.

In 1992, the route to Sparrows Point was modified, and buses took Wise Avenue rather than the Peninsula Expressway. This was initially done because of a road closure, but MTA, finding a demand for bus service on Wise Avenue, did not change the route back.

In 2005, as part of the Greater Baltimore Bus Initiative, a comprehensive overhaul plan for the region's transit system, Route 10 was combined with Route 2, and extended west from downtown Baltimore to Catonsville. Under this plan, all trips were routed to the Bullneck Road loop in Dundalk. Service to Sparrows Point, which had low ridership and required a heavy taxpayer subsidy, was no longer provided, and all other short branches on the route were discontinued. In addition, a portion of the route between Lombard Street and the State Center Metro subway station was eliminated. Riders on Wise Avenue were instructed to use Route 4.

The combined route was initially identified as Route 2/10 during a transitional period. On February 5, 2006, it was renamed simply to Route 10.

On November 1, 2016, a route 10 bus was involved in a fatal crash with a school bus. Six people, including the drivers of both buses and four passengers of the MTA bus were killed. The crash is currently under investigation.

=== BaltimoreLink ===
As part of the BaltimoreLink overhaul, on June 18, 2017 Route 10 will be served by two different routes. CityLink Purple will take the entire western part of Route 10, and CityLink Navy will take the eastern part of Route 10, with the route moving through O'Donnell Heights.

== See also ==
- Route 46 (supplements west side service during peak hours)
- Route 30 (supplements east side service during peak hours)
