= Route 46 (MTA Quickbus) =

Public bus route in Baltimore, Maryland, US

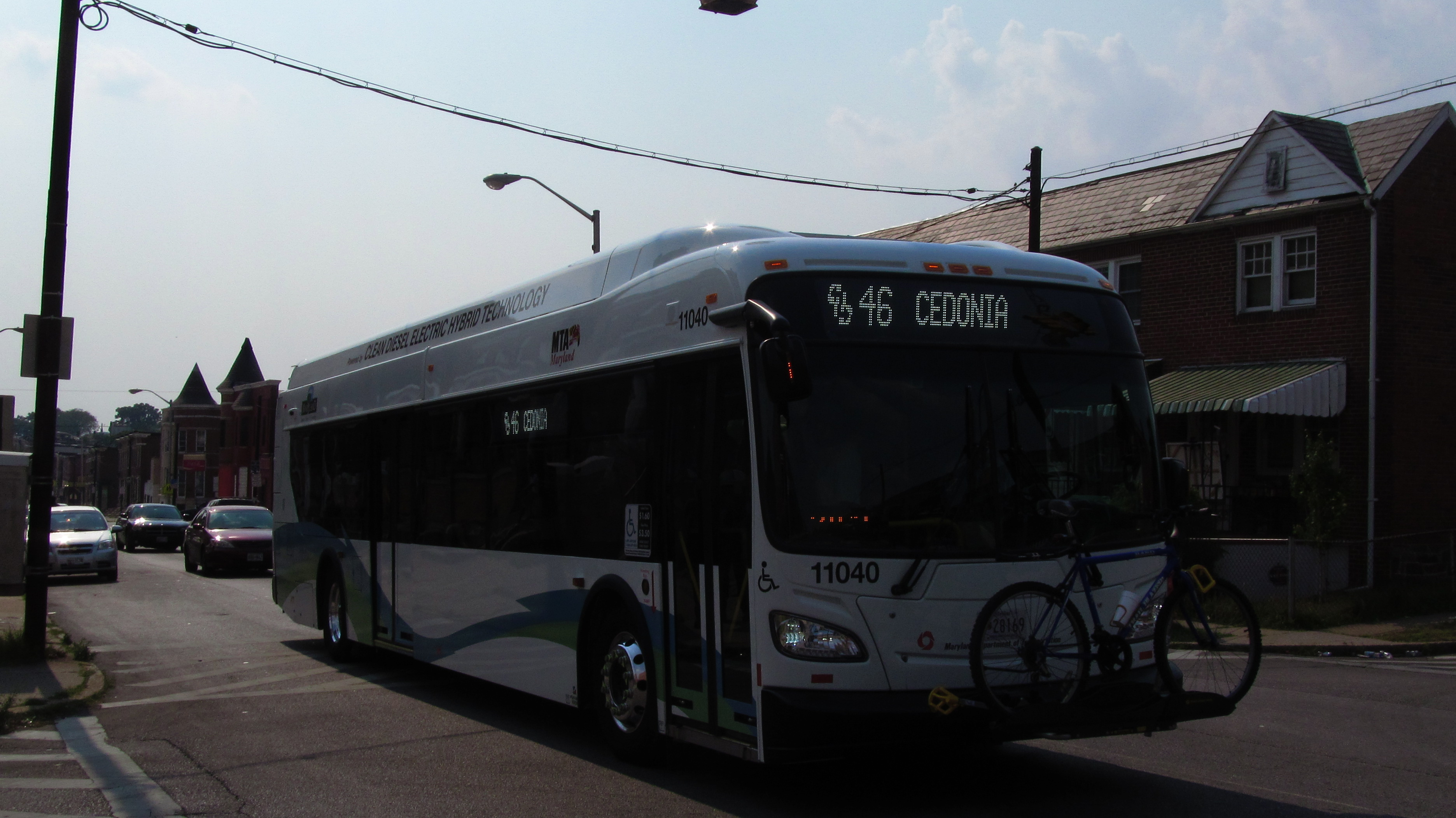

Overview
- System: Maryland Transit Administration
- Garage: Eastern; Bush
- Status: eliminated
- Began service: 2010
- Ended service: 2017

Route
- Locale: Baltimore City; Baltimore County
- Other routes: 1, 3, 5, 7, 8, 10, 11, 13, 15, 16, 19, 20, 22, 23, 24, 27, 30, 35, 36, qb40, 44, qb47, qb48, 51, 55, 57, 61, 64, 77, 91, 120, 150, 160

Service
- Level: Weekday peak only
- Frequency: Every 10-15 minutes
- Operates: 5:00 am to 9:30 am and 2:30 pm to 6:30pm

Route 46 was a limited stop bus route, identified as a "Quickbus", operated by the Maryland Transit Administration in Baltimore. The line ran from the Cedonia Loop in Northeast Baltimore to the Paradise Loop, in Catonsville. Service operated every 15 minutes during rush hour only. The line served the corridors of Frederick Avenue in West Baltimore, and Sinclair Lane/Cedonia Ave in Northeast Baltimore including the communities of Yale Heights, and Gwynns Falls in West Baltimore, and Berea and Parkside in East Baltimore.

Unlike a local bus, the 46 did not stop at every bus stop along its route; rather, its stops were limited to certain locations of importance, including transfer points to other bus lines, major landmarks, and other busy intersections selected by MTA. In all, there are 42 stops along the route.

== History ==
Route 46 started operating on August 28, 2010, becoming, along with Route 47, the third and fourth "QuickBus" services operated by MTA.

The no. 46 designation has previously been used for several other streetcars and buses in the Baltimore area. These included a shuttle that operated briefly in the Woodberry area that resembles part of the present Route 98 as a streetcar 1901-49 and as a bus 1949-70, and a series of routes for the Baltimore City Public Schools that operated 1999-2003.

== BaltimoreLink ==
When the revamped BaltimoreLink bus system began operating, the 46 went out of service. Its alignment has been replaced with the CityLink Purple and Pink. The Express BusLink 105 also runs along some of this alignment.

== See also ==
- Route 5 (All day local service)
- Route 10 (All day local service)
