= LocalLink 22 (BaltimoreLink) =

Bus route operated by the Maryland Transit Administration

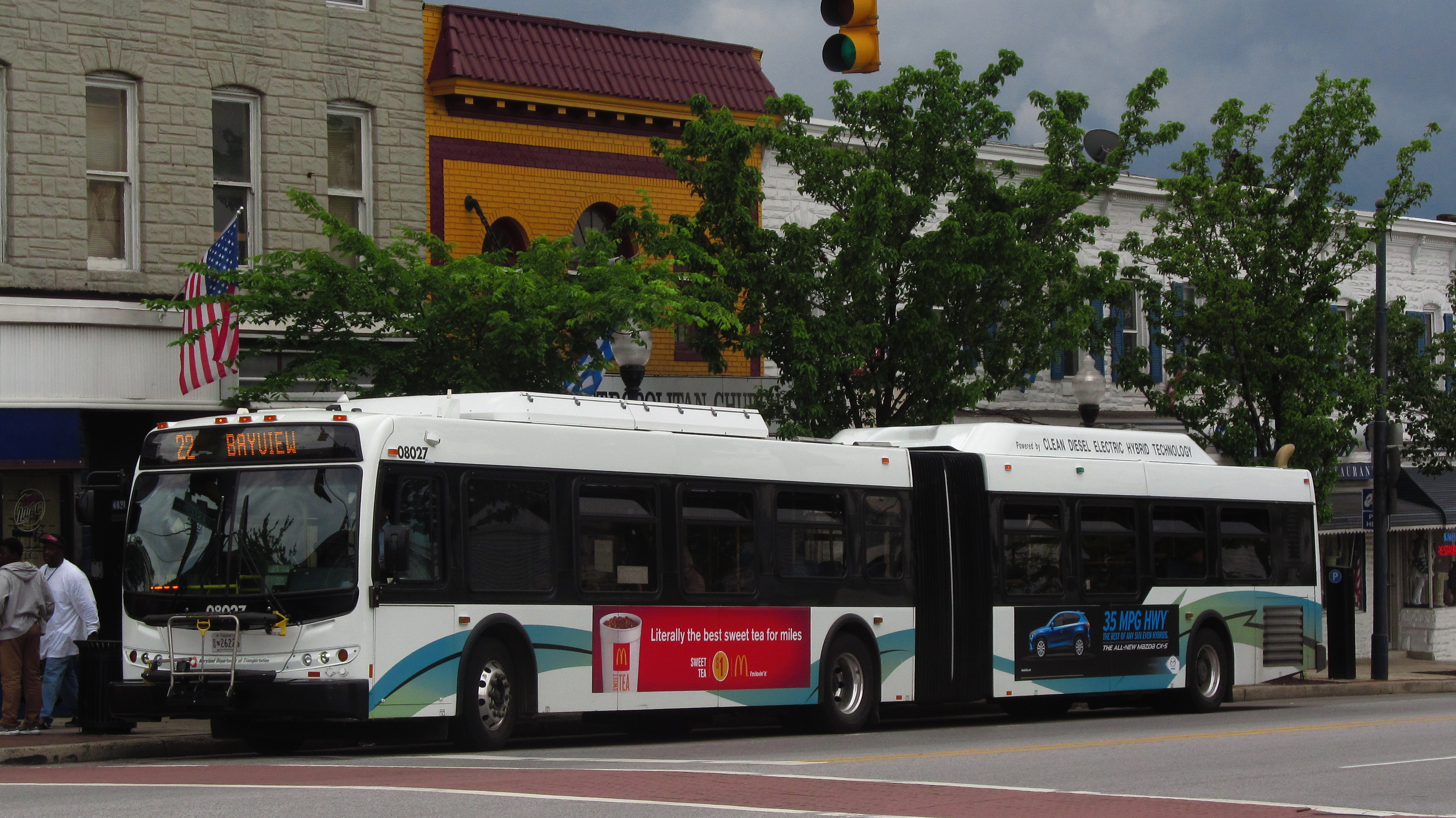

Overview
- System: Maryland Transit Administration
- Garage: Eastern & Northwest
- Status: active
- Began service: 1947
- Predecessors: Bus Route S

Route
- Locale: Baltimore City
- Communities served: Television Hill; Hampden; Homewood; Waverly; Belair-Edison
- Landmarks served: Druid Hill Park; Johns Hopkins University
- Other routes: 1, 3, 5, 7, 8, 10, 11, 12, 15, 19, 20, 21, 23, 27, 35, 35, 36, 38, qb40, qb46, qb47, qb48, 50, 51, 52, 53, 54, 61, 97, 98

Service
- Level: Daily
- Frequency: Every 20 minutes Every 10-15 minutes (peak)
- Weekend frequency: Every 20-30 minutes
- Operates: 4:30 am to 2:00 am

LocalLink 22 is a bus route operated by the Maryland Transit Administration in Baltimore. The line currently operates between the Mondawmin Metro Subway Station and Bayview Medical Center, serving Television Hill, the Woodberry Light Rail Stop, Hampden, The Rotunda, Homewood, Johns Hopkins University, Waverly, Belair-Edison, and Highlandtown.

Part of the route is the successor to the No. 34 streetcar and bus line.

== History ==
In 1907, the no. 34 streetcar started operating, known then as the Highlandtown Short Line. It operated until 1950 when it was converted into a bus route.

Route 22 started operating in 1947 as the successor to Bus Route S, which operated along a similar route starting in 1937.

In 1971, selected trips were extended through Southwest Baltimore along a route similar to today's Route 16. This service operated to Brooklyn, serving Rosemont, Lutheran Hospital, and the corridor of Hilton Street, Caton Avenue, and Patapsco Avenue.

In 1975, Route 22 was modified to absorb parts of Routes 34 and 57.

In January 2001, the service between Mondawmin and Brooklyn was split into a separate line identified as Route 16 in order to simplify and improve the reliability of service. The frequency of Route 16 would be increased later during the decade.

In 2006, as part of the Greater Baltimore Bus Initiative, the frequency of service on Route 22 was nearly doubled at most times to provide improved crosstown service, though the route of the line was not changed.

== BaltimoreLink ==
On June 18, 2017, Route 22 became LocalLink 22 and runs along the same route.

== In popular culture ==
In the novel The Reappearance of Sam Webber By Jonathon Scott Fuqua, the narrator describes throughout the book catching the bus (not identified in the book as no. 22) to various points along Route 22.

Part of the route of Route 22 is described in Journeys to the heart of Baltimore By Michael Olesker, in reference to where various ethnic groups board and depart, though the number 22 is not mentioned.
