= CityLink Red (BaltimoreLink) =

Bus route operated by the Maryland Transit Administration

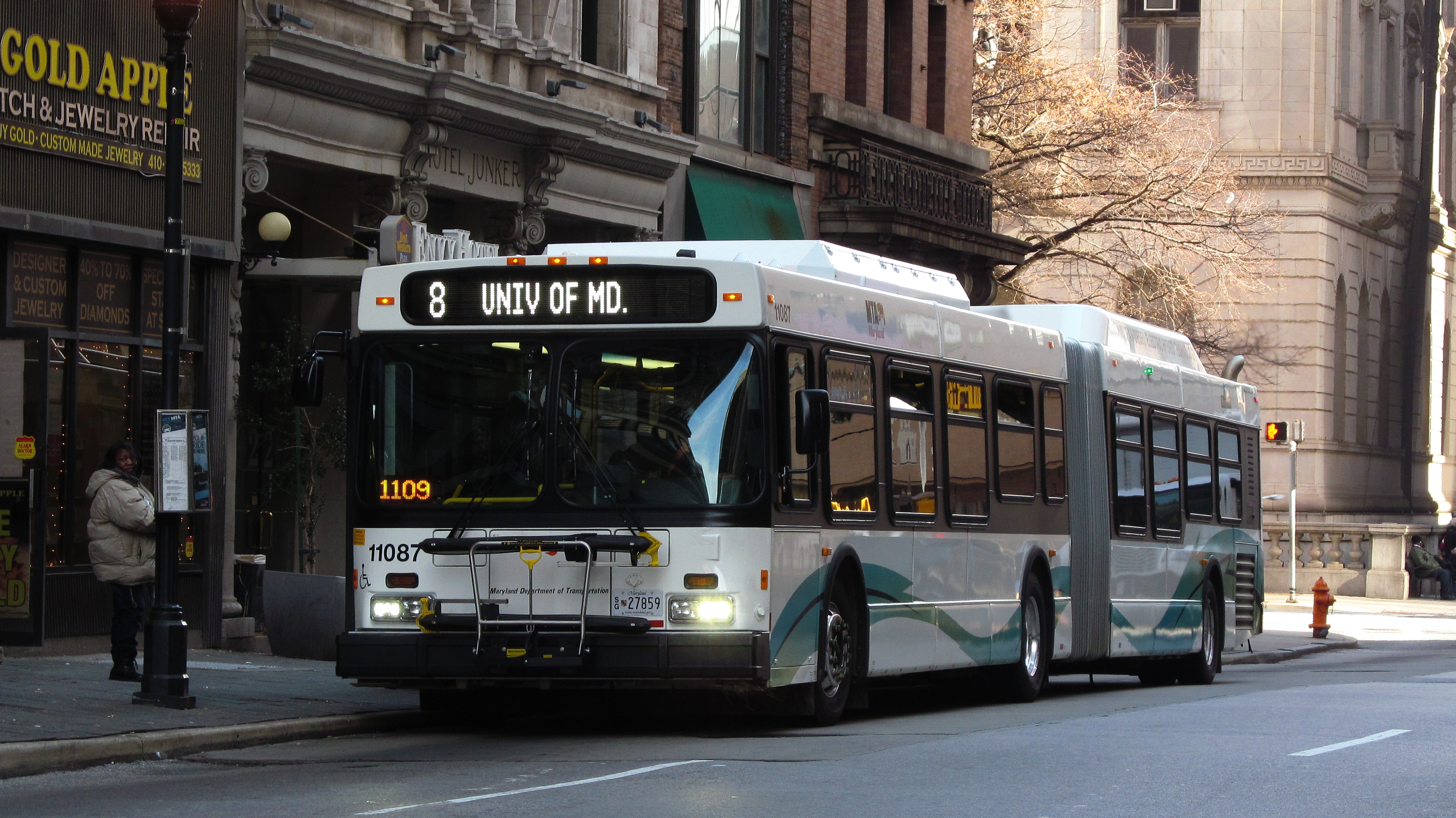

Overview
- System: MTA BaltimoreLink
- Garage: Kirk
- Status: active
- Began service: 1963
- Predecessors: Route 8 (1963-2017); No. 8 Streetcar (1898-1963)

Route
- Locale: Baltimore City; Baltimore County
- Communities served: Towson; Stoneleigh; Govans; Waverly
- Landmarks served: Towson Town Center; Towson University; Belvedere Square; Senator Theater
- Other routes: 1, 3, 5, 7, 9, 10, 11, 12, 13, 15, 19, 20, 21, 22, 23, 27, 30, 33, 35, 36, qb40, 44, qb46, qb47, qb48, 55, 58, 61, 64, 91, 120, 150, 160

Service
- Level: Daily
- Frequency: Every 15 minutes Every 15 minutes (peak)
- Weekend frequency: Every 15-30 minutes
- Operates: 24 hours
- Ridership: 2,393,952 (2022)

CityLink Red (abbreviated RD) is a MTA BaltimoreLink bus route operated by the Maryland Transit Administration in Baltimore and its suburbs. The line currently runs from the University of Maryland Transit Center to the Lutherville Light Rail Stop along the corridors of York Road and Greenmount Avenue, and is the most heavily used MTA bus line. The CityLink Red bus replaced Route 8 bus route due to BaltimoreLink, and is the successor to the 8 Towson and 7 Govanstown streetcar lines.

== History ==
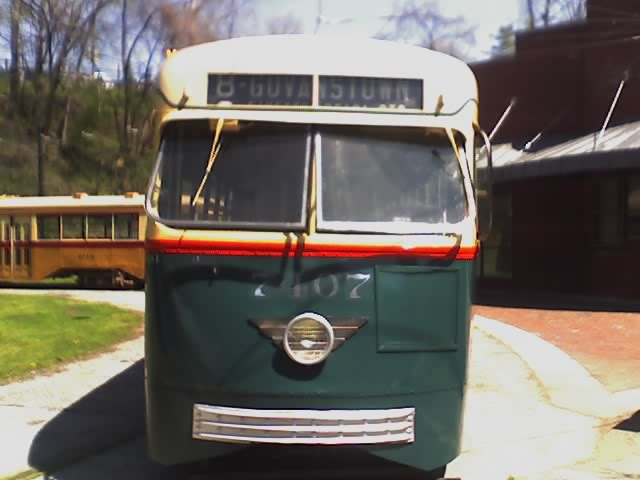
A former no. 8 streetcar, the predecessor to bus Route 8, at the Baltimore Streetcar Museum. This vehicle is currently used to give rides to visitors.

Route 8 was electrified in 1895 as a streetcar running from Towson to Catonsville. Back then, it served the corridors of York Road, Greenmount Avenue, and Frederick Road through downtown Baltimore. Another streetcar, known as "no. 7," operated a short-turn version of this route from Govanstown to Irvington before being absorbed into no. 8 in 1931. In 1963, the line was converted into a bus operation, retaining this route. The no. 8 streetcar was the final streetcar line of Baltimore to undergo a conversion into a bus service.

There were also various branches of Route 8 added over the years to communities including Mt. Washington (added in 1972, designated 8A), Cockeysville (operated 1973-1989, designated 8B), Providence/Springlake (operated 1973-1989, designated 8D and 8E), Eudowood, the Towson State University campus, and Stella Maris nursing home, which opened in 1980. All these services have since been absorbed by other lines or otherwise abolished.

In 1982, Route 8 was split into two separate lines in order to provide improved schedule adherence on each line and varied frequencies of service along each corridor, where demands for service varied. The new Route 8 ran from the center of Towson to the University of Maryland Transit Center, and the new Route 2 from Catonsville to City Hall. Service along Route 2 is currently provided by Route 10.

In 1992, in conjunction with the opening of the Central Light Rail line, Route 8 was extended north of Towson to the Lutherville Light Rail Stop on Ridgely Road except on Sundays. This extension mostly overlapped with Route 9, and this duplication of service during off-peak hours was criticized as costly. Branches to the Towson State campus and Stella Maris, though originally proposed for elimination, continued to operate at this time.

In 1993, MTA, addressing the cost issue of the extension, eliminated Route 9 service between Towson and Lutherville during off-peak weekday hours, and improved the frequency of that line's service on other parts of the route. The Lutherville extension on Saturdays was also discontinued, and on weekends, improved levels of this service were provided on Route 9.

In 2000, MTA combined Routes 8 and 9, and extended selected Route 8 trips from Lutherville to Hunt Valley. This constituted about two-thirds of trips at most times. This consolidation saved costs and allowed single-seat service along the York Road corridor at all times, while making Route 8 one of the longest routes operated by MTA.

== Greater Baltimore Bus Initiative changes ==
In 2005, as part of the Greater Baltimore Bus Initiative, a comprehensive overhaul of the region's bus service, MTA announced that Routes 8 and 9 would once again be split into two separate lines. This time, all Route 8 trips would operate to/from Lutherville seven days a week, and Route 9 would provide all service on the route north of Ridgely Road. In addition, all other branches on the line would be eliminated. These included those to Loveton, International Circle (both former branches of Route 9), and Stella Maris. And in order to reduce overcrowding of buses, MTA stated that articulated buses, which have a higher seating capacity, would be used on all Route 8 trips.

Service is no longer provided to Loveton by MTA, but a private contractor was chartered by employers in the area to provide shuttle service. In February 2006, all Route 9 were rerouted to International Circle due to complaints about the elimination of this branch. In February 2009, York, Pennsylvania's Rabbit Transit started providing service on its new Route 83S which connects to the light rail.

=== Stella Maris service ===
The Stella Maris branch of Route 8 was also discontinued as a part of GBBI. But due to public outcry, service to Stella Maris is still provided on a new Route 12.

=== BaltimoreLink ===
As part of the BaltimoreLink transit overhaul to take place on June 18, 2017, Route 8 will be replaced in its entirety by CityLink Red.

== Route 48 Quickbus ==
The Route 48 Quickbus began service on August 30, 2009, replacing the Route 8 Express Bus. It was the second of Quickbus route initiated by MTA; Route 40 was rebranded as the MTA's first Quickbus on January 30, 2007. Service operated Monday through Saturday every 15 minutes between 5:30 AM and 6:30 PM. Route 48 was identical to the Route 8 bus, except that it did not operate along the segment between Towson and Lutherville. But, unlike the Route 8 local bus, the 48 did not stop at every bus stop along its route. Rather, its stops were limited to certain locations of importance, including transfer points to other bus lines, major landmarks, and other busy intersections selected by MTA. In total, there were 28 stops along the route.

The no. 48 designation has previously been used for several streetcar and bus routes, including the No. 48 Streetcar, which operated between Mt. Washington and Belvedere loop in 1949-50 along the present route of Route 27, the SEET Shuttle which operated briefly 1988-89, and a series of routes for students of the Baltimore City Public Schools that operated 1997-2004.

Route 48 was replaced by CityLink Red on June 18, 2017 as part of the BaltimoreLink transit overhaul program.

== In popular culture ==
- Author Darrin Keith Bastfield in his book Back in the day describes riding the bus on Greenmount Avenue along with future rapper Tupac Shakur
- Actress Jean Hill can be seen hijacking the bus in John Waters' 1981 film, Polyester
