= QuickLink 40 (BaltimoreLink) =

Bus route operating from Woodlawn to Middle River, Maryland, US

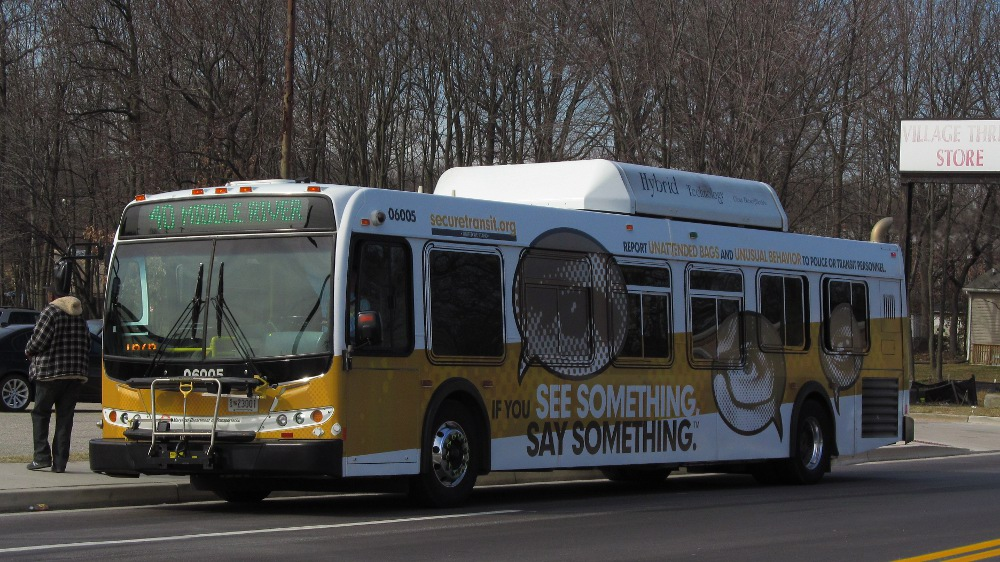

Overview
- System: Maryland Transit Administration
- Garage: Eastern; Bush
- Status: active
- Began service: 2005 (as Quickbus 40); August 27, 2023 (as QuickLink 40)
- Ended service: June 18, 2017
- Predecessors: Bus Route S Quickbus 40

Route
- Locale: Baltimore City; Baltimore County
- Communities served: Woodlawn, Westgate; Edmondson Village; Rosemont; Essex
- Landmarks served: West Baltimore MARC Rail Station; Johns Hopkins Hospital; Johns Hopkins Bayview Medical Center; Eastpoint Mall
- Start: Woodlawn - CMS
- Via: Security Boulevard, Edmondson Avenue, Franklin-Mulberry Expressway, Baltimore Street, Fayette Street, Eastern Avenue
- End: Essex - Bayner Road & Sandalwood Road
- Length: 21.1 mi (34.0 km)
- Other routes: 1, 3, 4, 5, 7, 8, 10, 11, 13, 15, 16, 19, 20, 22, 23, 24, 27, 30, 35, 36, 38, 44, qb46, qb47, qb48, 51, 55, 57, 61, 64, 77, 91, 120, 150, 160

Service
- Level: Daily
- Frequency: Every 15 minutes Every 10-15 minutes (peak)
- Weekend frequency: Every 15-30 minutes
- Operates: 5:00 am to 10:30 pm

QuickLink 40 is a limited stop bus route operated by the Maryland Transit Administration in Baltimore and its suburbs. Formerly the Quickbus 40, the line was discontinued in June 2017 as part of the BaltimoreLink system rebranding along with the other "Quickbus" limited-stop routes. On August 27, 2023, QuickBus 40 (now QuickLink 40), was re-launched after it was discontinued in 2017.

== Route ==
QuickLink 40 starts at the North Bend Loop in Westgate, running on Edmondson Avenue until reaching West Baltimore station. It then runs on the Franklin-Mulberry Expressway into Downtown, using the Baltimore and Fayette couplet to travel through Downtown before eastbound buses use Central Avenue to shift onto Fayette Street. It then turns south on Highland Avenue, east on Lombard Street, and south on Bayview Avenue through the Bayview Medical Center campus before turning onto Eastern Avenue and continuing until finally terminating at Selig Avenue.

QuickLink 40, unlike LocalLink or CityLink bus routes, does not stop at every bus stop along its route. Rather, its stops are limited to certain locations of importance, including transfer points to other bus lines, major landmarks, and other busy intersections selected by MTA. It ironically serves as a limited-stop version of the CityLink Blue and CityLink Orange, which were the two routes that replaced its predecessor, QuickBus 40.

== History ==
The Route 40 started operating on October 23, 2005 as part of the Greater Baltimore Bus Initiative, a plan of then-governor Robert L. Ehrlich for streamlining and simplifying the Baltimore transit system. Unlike a rail line, this addition did not require any construction. The bus route was intended to resemble the proposed Red Line that is currently being studied for the Baltimore region.

When it started operating, Route 40 ran from Security Square Mall to the Essex Park-and-Ride lot on Eastern Avenue. Weekday service operated every 10 minutes during rush hour and midday. On February 5 the following year, it was extended to Middle River and reduced to one bus every 12–15 minutes.

On June 10, 2007, the eastern layover was moved to a safer location at Old Eastern and Vincent Avenues. The western layover was moved to CMS on February 8, 2009 and the stop at Security Square Mall was moved from the parking lot of the mall to a point along Security Boulevard adjacent to the mall lot.

=== Quickbus 40 PLUS Service ===
Enhanced service for West Baltimore residents on the QuickBus 40 will begin October 25, 2015. The enhanced service will increase frequency and reliability on the line between the Centers for Medicare and Medicaid in Baltimore County and City Hall in Baltimore City.

=== Tracking of buses ===
At 11 stops along the route, a new experimental system was installed late in 2006. Electronic signs at these stops, tied into a GPS system, indicate the expected time of arrival for the next bus, so riders do not have to rely on a less reliable printed schedule. MTA is considering implementing this system at many more bus stops along other routes in the future.

=== QuickBus Structuring ===
On December 21, 2006, Bus Route 40 was rebranded as "QuickBus" in order to better promote the service. Special pylons were added at selected stops to mark the locations.

The name "QuickBus" was synonymous with Bus Route 40 until August 30, 2009, when another QuickBus line, known as Route 48, started operation along the Greenmount Ave/York Rd corridor. The MTA had added two more QuickBus lines: Route 46 and Route 47 on August 29, 2010.

=== Discontinuation ===
As part of the BaltimoreLink system overhaul, on June 18, 2017, QuickBus 40 was replaced by CityLink Blue on its western portion and CityLink Orange on its eastern portion. In April 2022, the MTA announced a proposal to revive the route before the end of the same year as the QuickLink 40.

=== 2023 revival ===
On August 27, 2023, the QuickLink 40 was brought back, however, it only runs on weekdays and runs to North Bend Loop in Westgate instead of Centers for Medicare and Medicaid Services in Woodlawn.

In April 2025, as part of its Fall 2025 Service Change Proposal, the MTA release plans to extend the QuickLink 40 services to include a further reach and increased level of service. The service will operate every 15 from 6:00 a.m. to 6:00 p.m. on weekdays and new weekend service every 20 minutes. These changes went into effect on August 24, 2025.

In August 2026, construction began to install bus lanes along the route of the proposed Red Line to improve service on the CityLink Orange, CityLink Blue, and QuickLink 40 routes.
