= Orangeville, Baltimore =

Neighborhood in Baltimore

Orangeville
- Neighborhood of Baltimore
- Interactive map of Orangeville
- Country: United States
- State: Maryland
- City: Baltimore
- Time zone: Eastern
  - Summer (DST): EDT
- ZIP codes: 21224
- Area code(s): 410, 443, 667

Orangeville is a small neighborhood in the eastern part of Baltimore, Maryland, United States. It is primarily a residential and industrial area and is located near major transportation routes, including the Amtrak rail line and Pulaski Highway.
