= Ramblewood, Baltimore =

Neighborhood in Baltimore, Maryland, US

Coordinates: 39°21′46.5″N 76°35′26″W

Ramblewood is a small community located in northeast Baltimore, Maryland, United States. Ramblewood is located south of Northern Parkway with The Alameda serving as its western boundary and Loch Raven Blvd. as its eastern boundary and north of Belvedere Ave. The Ramblewood Community Association has had residential parking permits issued to its members as the result of the proliferation of students from Morgan parking in the neighborhood.

== Demographics ==
According to the 2000 US Census, 2020 people live in Ramblewood with 86.9% African-American and 9.7% White. The median household income is $51,103. 92.7% of the houses are occupied and 75.8 are occupied by the home's owner.

== See also ==
- List of Baltimore neighborhoods
