= LocalLink 80 (BaltimoreLink) =

Bus route in Baltimore, Maryland

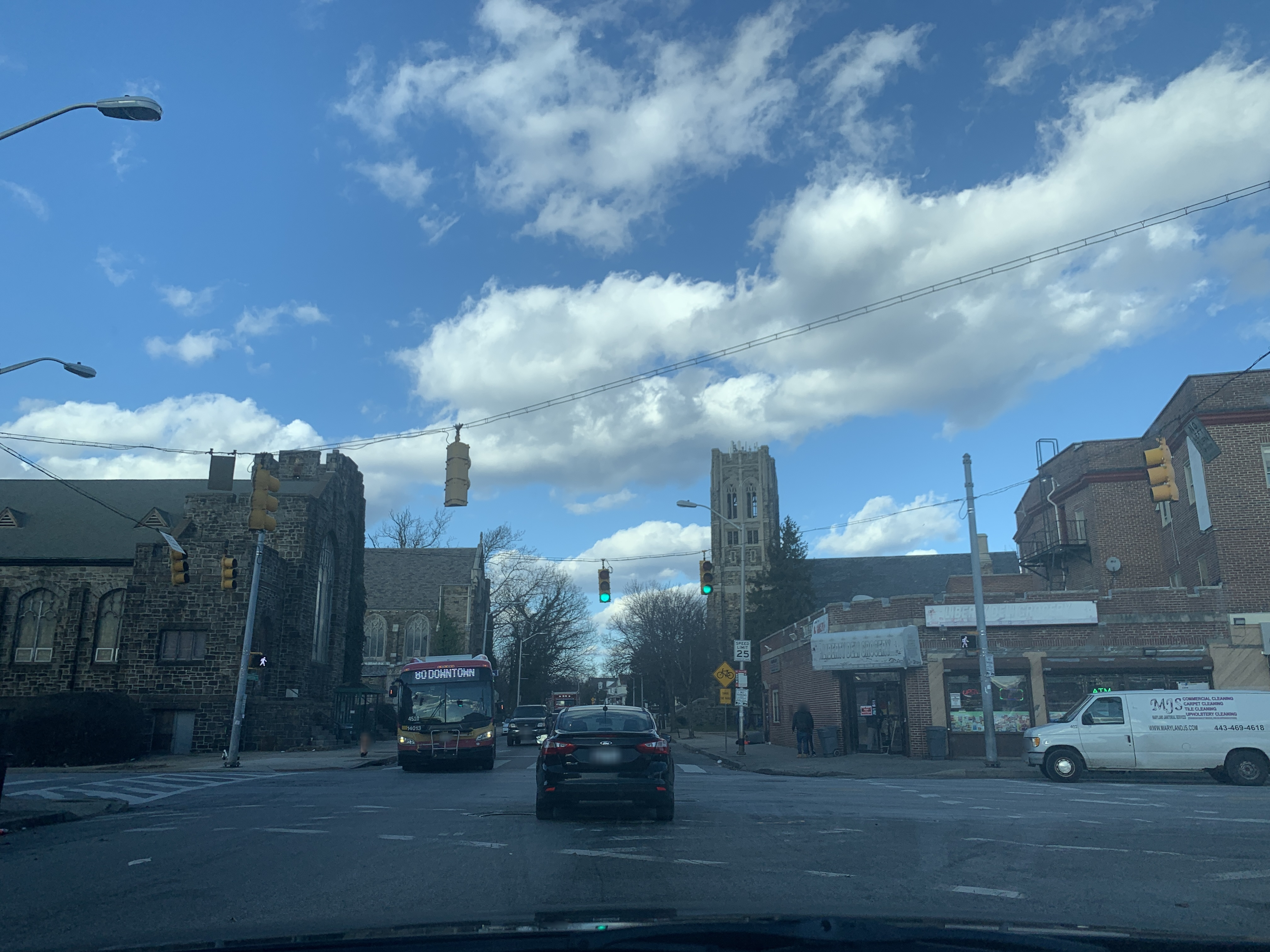

Overview
- System: Maryland Transit Administration
- Garage: Northwest
- Status: active
- Began service: 1987
- Predecessors: No. 31 Streetcar (1917-1952); No. 19 Streetcar (1952-1956); No. 19 Bus (1956-1987)

Route
- Locale: Baltimore City

Service
- Level: Daily

LocalLink 80 is a bus route operated by the Maryland Transit Administration in Baltimore, Maryland, in the United States. LocalLink 80 is part of the high frequency network of the local bus system. The route consists of a leg originating in Downtown Baltimore and goes on to serve the Garrison Boulevard corridor in the northwest of the city. Route 80 and its predecessor, route 91, has carried some of the highest ridership out of Baltimore's local bus network throughout its history. The line was the first in the city to be assigned articulated buses, which are now used to meet the higher capacity requirements of the frequent lines.

Map

== History ==
Route 91 started operating in 1987 after being split from the long Route 19. It has followed essentially the same route throughout its lifetime since then, only with the modification of service operating via the Rogers Avenue Metro Subway Station full-time. The line has faced various proposals for consolidation into other lines, but all have been fought.

The route replaced Route 91 in 2017 as part of the BaltimoreLink overhaul of the bus network. The 91 had the second-highest farebox recovery rate of all MTA bus lines.

The bus route is the successor to the 16 Madison Avenue and 31 Garrison Boulevard streetcar lines.

=== Origin ===
The No. 31 Streetcar started operating in 1917. In 1952, it was absorbed by the No. 19 Streetcar, which in 1956 was converted to a bus. The no. 19 bus continued to operate from the Harford Road corridor to Garrison Boulevard for more than 30 years. The route was extended to Sinai Hospital when it absorbed the short lived Bus Route 90, which had operated from 1959 to 1960 between the Belvedere loop to Sinai.

In 1992, in conjunction with the opening of the Central Light Rail line, MTA proposed to eliminate Route 91 and provide the service on other routes, primarily Route 13. However, this plan was scrapped as a result of public outcry.

In 2005, as part of the Greater Baltimore Bus Initiative, a comprehensive overhaul plan for the region's transit system, MTA proposed once again to discontinue Route 91, and for the service to be absorbed by other routes, primarily by modifying Route 15 to Sinai Hospital. This plan was scrapped as a result of public outcry, especially because no bus service would have been provided on Eutaw Place in Bolton Hill.

In 2006, as part of phase II of GBBI, MTA proposed for Route 91 to remain on its current route at a reduced frequency, and for a new Route M-5 to operate from the Mt. Washington Light Rail Stop to Penn-North Metro Subway Station with overlapping service between Pimlico and Penn-North. Such a plan is yet to be implemented, and GBBI was canceled in 2007.

=== BaltimoreLink ===
In 2015, Governor Larry Hogan announced an initial proposal for an overhaul to the local bus system in Baltimore which constituted a drastic transformation of the network. This proposal included 12 color-coded high frequency routes and lower frequency routes which did not serve all of the same corridors served by the existing bus network or the streetcar network it was modeled after before it. Residents of Northwest Baltimore noted that service along Garrison Boulevard between Walbrook and Rogers Avenue Metro station was proposed to be eliminated, and State Senator Lisa A. Gladden spoke out against the proposal, stating that it would be unfair to leave residents of her district with walking long distances along Garrison or from a stop on a route serving another corridor. The exclusion of the Garrison Boulevard route and the Greenmount Avenue route (CityLink Red) were seen as some of the most glaring omissions from the plan, as these had long been some of the system's most heavily utilized routes. In response to the public reaction to the initial proposal, the MTA revised 86 percent of the proposed routes before arriving something resembled the city's long standing bus network, which mimicked the streetcar routes which came before them. A new plan for the Garrison Boulevard route released in 2016 featured the re-introduction of a downtown connection to Baltimore City Hall.

== Proposed infrastructure ==
The LocalLink 80 is one of the routes the MTA has selected as a candidate for making substantial infrastructure changes to the roads it travels on, based on assessments of inefficiencies introduced by the built environment and on the amount of riders who would stand to benefit from improved service. This proposal follows the completion of the "North Avenue Rising" project in 2021, which saw the resurfacing of North Avenue and installation of bus lanes to serve the CityLink Gold route.

== See also ==
- History of MTA Maryland
