= LocalLink 56 (BaltimoreLink) =

Bus route in Baltimore, Maryland and its suburbs

Local Link 56
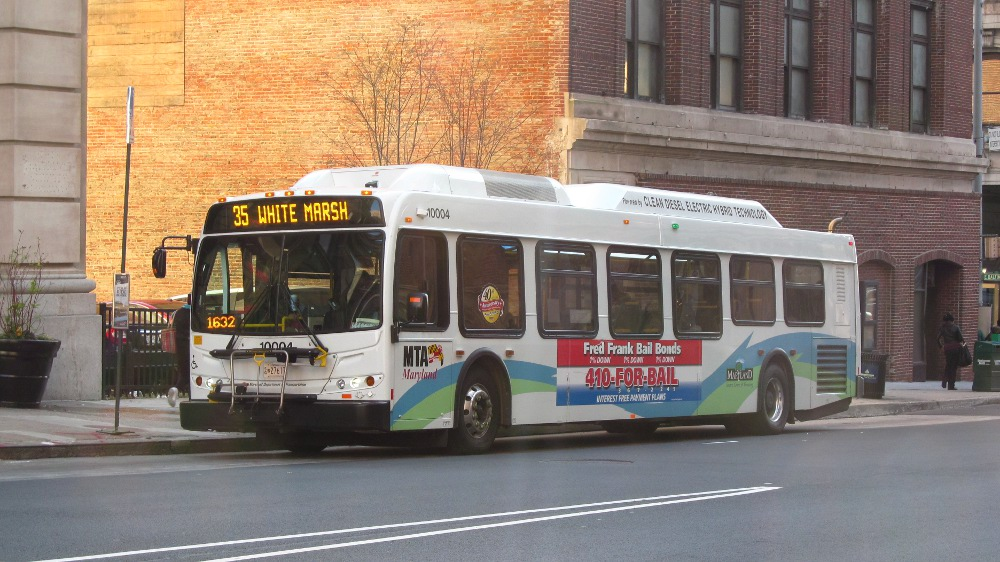

Overview
- System: Maryland Transit Administration
- Garage: Eastern; Bush
- Status: active
- Began service: June 2017
- Predecessors: Route 35

Route
- Locale: Baltimore City
- Communities served: White Marsh; Rosedale; Rossville; Nottingham; Downtown Baltimore
- Landmarks served: City Hall (Baltimore); Johns Hopkins Hospital; Franklin Square Hospital; Community College of Baltimore County; White Marsh Town Center

Service
- Level: Daily
- Frequency: Every 20 minutes Every 15 minutes (peak)
- Weekend frequency: Every 30 minutes
- Map: Local Link 56

LocalLink Route 56 is a bus route operated by the Maryland Transit Administration in Baltimore and its suburbs. The line runs between the Park and Ride station in White Marsh and Charles Center in Downtown Baltimore. In June 2017, LocalLink 56 replaced the former local bus Route 35, which connected the city's downtown area with White Marsh, to the east of the city, and UMBC to the west. Route 35 was the successor to the No. 3 Wilkens Avenue and No, 6 Monument Street streetcar lines.

== BaltimoreLink rebranding ==
Local transit buses running between White Marsh and Downtown Baltimore previously operated as the Route 35 line. This bus line connected the city's downtown area with White Marsh, to the east of the city, and UMBC to the west. Route 35 was the successor to the No. 3 Wilkens Avenue and No. 6 Monument Street streetcar lines. It was discontinued in June 2017 with the overhaul and rebranding of Baltimore's transit system. The connection between White Marsh and Downtown Baltimore is currently provided by the CityLink Brown and LocalLink 56 lines. Transit service to UMBC is provided by LocalLink 37 and 32, but these lines do not have a direct route to the downtown area.

== Route 35 history ==
Route 35 started operating with that designation on May 1, 1970 between Oliver Beach and downtown Baltimore, serving the Philadelphia Road/Pulaski Highway corridor. In 1971, the Oliver Beach section was extended to serve Bowleys Quarters. Prior to that date, various other buses and streetcar routes served these two branches of Route 35. The most notable was a streetcar line that operated from Lorraine to downtown between 1920 and 1929 along a route similar to the present Route 15, which from 1929 to 1954 ran only from Lorraine to Walbrook. In 1954, this line was converted to a bus, and in 1966 it was merged into Route 15. The other two bus routes that briefly ran and used the number 35 designation were a shuttle that operated between the UMBC and Catonsville Community College campuses in 1966 (a service currently provided by Route 77), and the bus that ran along Coldspring Lane from 1968 to 1969 (where Route 33 now runs).

The No. 9 Halethorpe Streetcar served the Wilkens Avenue corridor starting in 1900. In 1926, this service was merged into the No. 3 Streetcar Line, which had operated to Reservoir Hill. (Currently, Bus Route 5 provides the closest service to this). In 1948, Bus Route 12 replaced Wilkens Avenue service. This remained in place when Route 12 was merged into Bus Route 3, which had a northern terminus at Baynesville. Bus Route 3 continued to operate from Baynesville to Halethorpe until 1987, when it was split. The no. 3 designation was given to the north end, which remains to this day. The south end was designated Route 31. Route 31 served the Wilkens Avenue corridor until 2005.

On the east side, Monument Street had been served by the No. 4 Streetcar since 1894. The no. 4 Streetcar operated between Windsor Hills and Orangeville (Kresson Street). In 1935, the No. 6 Curtis Bay Streetcar took over the Monument Street operation. This was converted into a bus operation in 1948.

In 1970, Bus Route 35 started operating between Franklin Square Hospital Center and downtown along the Philadelphia Road corridor in Baltimore County. In the city, the line operated along Pulaski Highway and Madison and Monument Streets, serving Johns Hopkins Hospital before reached its terminus at University of Maryland Transit Center. The line provided minimum amounts of service, especially outside of rush hour. During off-peak hours, service operated only as often as a single bus allowed, which at some times, was only once every 2–3 hours. All trips on this line until the mid-90s were considered to be express service, making limited stops on parts of the route, and requiring payment of an additional fare.

In 1977, Bus Route 6 was split into four new lines, with one or more serving each corridor the entire route had previously served. A new Route 62 was formed, which operated between Hollander Ridge and the Inner Harbor. For the next 23 years, bus routes 35 and 62 operated along much of the same route in Baltimore City. Route 35 served the county portion of the corridor, and did not have the deviations Route 62 had in the city, but had several within the county.

Over the years, certain special branches and deviations were added to selected trips on the line to serve various places, including the Essex Community College campus, Chesaco Park, Marshfield Business Park, Oliver Beach, (this service has been provided by Route 24 since 1988), and King Avenue (in 1994, all trips were extended to King Avenue).

In the fall of 1992, MTA announced that weekend service on Route 35 would be eliminated in January 1993 due to low ridership. After public outcry resulting from these cuts, MTA arranged for a private contractor to provide weekend service along Philadelphia Road. This service was eventually cut. But in 2000, weekend service on Route 35 was restored.

In 1997, Route 35 started to make its first comeback from its cuts earlier in the decade when all trips on the line were extended to White Marsh. There was no actual addition in the level of service provided when the route was extended. In fact, midday frequency was reduced as the single bus that operated had a longer route. But this became the most frequent service to White Marsh Mall, an area previously served by a minimal amount of bus service.

In 2000, Route 35 saw yet its biggest expansion. The line was combined with Route 62. By using the operating budget of the two lines together to operate a single route, MTA was able to provide hourly service to White Marsh at all times, with other trips making short turns at the city line, and operating via Armistead Gardens, a deviation on Route 62.

In 2005, as part of the Greater Baltimore Bus Initiative, a comprehensive overhaul plan for the Baltimore region, Route 35 was combined with Route 31, and extended west to UMBC. At this time, all trips were extended to White Marsh, with short turns no longer being made at the city line. In order to reduce confusion, the new combined line, during its first three months of operation, was identified as Route 31/35 before it once again assumed the Route 35 designation on February 5, 2006.

=== Overhaul changes ===
As a result of the overhaul, deviations from the main corridor of Route 35 were eliminated. While some were provided by other lines, others were no longer served by any MTA buses.

- Route 33 was extended south from Moravia to Eastpoint Mall. This route included Armistead Gardens, so bus riders in this area would not have to walk to Pulaski Highway.
- Route 4, which was supposed to terminate in the north at Franklin Square Hospital, was extended to the campus of CCBC Essex. Later, Route 24 was also extended there.
- Route 55 had already been serving the intersection of Golden Ring Road and Kenwood Avenue in Rosedale, and continued to do so.
- Bus service was no longer provided to Chesaco Park.

In June 2017, Route 35 was discontinued as the BaltimoreLink system was launched.
