= Greater Baltimore Bus Initiative =

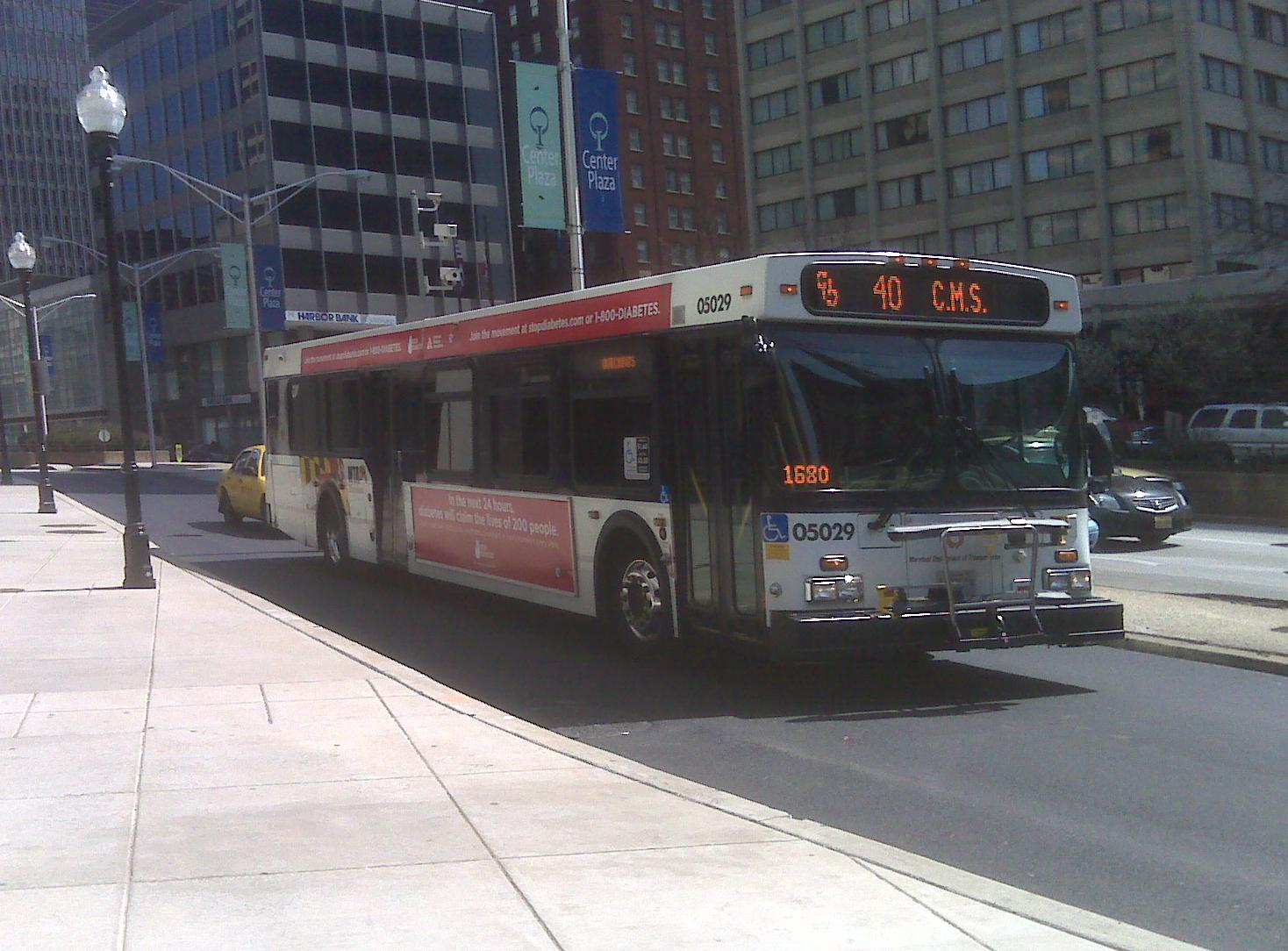
The introduction of the #40 limited stop bus was part of the Greater Baltimore Bus Initiative

The Greater Baltimore Bus Initiative (GBBI) (pronounced GIBBY) was a sweeping overhaul planned by the Maryland Transit Administration under the administration of then-Maryland Governor Robert Ehrlich and his transportation secretary Robert Flanagan that was said to be the largest single-phase overhaul in the history of the agency and its parent companies.

According to Ehrlich and Flanagan, the initiative was a series of improvements to the transit system in the Baltimore area. While some of the proposed changes were obvious improvements, others were heavily opposed by riders, elected officials, and advocates, who considered them inconveniences and losses of service. As a result, a scaled-back version of the plan dubbed Phase I was implemented on its originally scheduled date, October 23, 2005, that included about one-third of the original plans and some modifications to those. Of those plans not implemented on this date, some were entirely scrapped, and others delayed.

During 2006, a second wave of changes dubbed Phase II was proposed and was modified during that year. Though Flanagan continued to state these were improvements, these plans continued to be viewed as controversial and resulted in legislative action to delay their implementation.

Following these political battles and the change of administration in the state of Maryland, the remainder of GBBI was officially canceled in on May 9, 2007, with no further routing changes being made under that name. But in September 2007, MTA announced that a series of hearings would be held the following month regarding a new wave of proposed changes. Though not titled "Greater Baltimore Bus Initiative" or anything similar, some of the planned changes did resemble those previously announced as part of GBBI. Most of these new routings were implemented on February 17, 2008.

== Background ==
Announced in the Summer 2005, the GBBI plan involved routing and scheduling changes to all but six of the agency's then 59 local bus lines and some of its commuter services. These modifications included some expansions, increased frequency of service on some lines, consolidation of some lines, and elimination of others.

According to MTA, service would be improved in the following ways:

1. Frequency would be increased in many areas
2. Service would be simplified from a set of lines with many branches each to a set of routes with all trips following the identical route
3. There would be longer layovers, allowing for more recovery time and better reliability
4. Lines would be made more direct with fewer transfers being made necessary and fewer deviations off the main routes
5. Bus stops would be better placed to strike a balance between access and efficiency
6. Rapid west-east crosstown service would be provided on a new No. 40 Line that would operate from Security Square Mall to Essex Park-and-Ride
7. Some lines would be combined for single-seat service to a broader range of areas
8. Duplication of service by multiple bus lines would be reduced in order to use the savings generated to provide additional service on other lines
9. Improved bus service would be provided to landmarks where ridership was in greater demand, including colleges, universities, hospitals, and shopping malls.
10. Improved crosstown service would be provided, as most riders today are not trying to travel downtown, but rather other places in the city
11. Improved midday service would be provided, as midday ridership has steadily increased over the years

The plan did not meet well with riders, community activists, and elected officials. According to critics, the plan had the following problems:

- Bus service would be eliminated on certain streets, requiring riders, including the elderly and disabled, to walk a few extra blocks to reach a bus line.
- Certain lines and branches of some lines serving various employers were to be eliminated. MTA described these as underutilized branches.
- Travel for some would be more complicated, requiring additional transfers. For those less able to adapt, travel would be even more troubling.
- The plan was also criticized for being deceptive. While the advantages provided to riders were highlighted, the losses of service or reductions in frequency that resulted were mentioned little if at all.

A series of hearings were held during that summer pertaining to the changes. Many of the modifications were met with heavy criticism from the riders, the media, elected officials, and civic organizations, and as a result, many planned changes were either delayed or not implemented at all.

== Phase I ==
On October 23, 2005, the original planned date with the changes to take effect, a scaled-back version of the plan, dubbed Phase I, was implemented. Service was added, eliminated, reduced, or modified on just 26 lines in the system, where MTA believed these changes would have only a minimal negative impact. Lines involved in these changes included nos. 2, 4, 8, 10, 13, 20, 23, 24, 31, 33, 35, 44, 65, 77, 86, 102, 103, 105, 150, 160, M-1, M-6, M-8, M-10, M-12, and M-17 (see "changes" below for more details).

Nevertheless, the changes were met by riders with disdain, and were protested by the NAACP and various unions. Many riders were still forced to walk farther, transfer, or wait longer for buses, and some riders were left without any service. Others complained that the new lines were less reliable. Critics complained that the GBBI changes made travel more difficult for many riders. Some of the complaints of riders that were reported in the Baltimore Sun were as follows:

- Riders who at one time caught Route 10 buses along Wise Avenue for service straight into Baltimore City now had to catch a bus on Route 4, which only provided hourly service, and did not serve various communities deviating off of Wise Avenue.

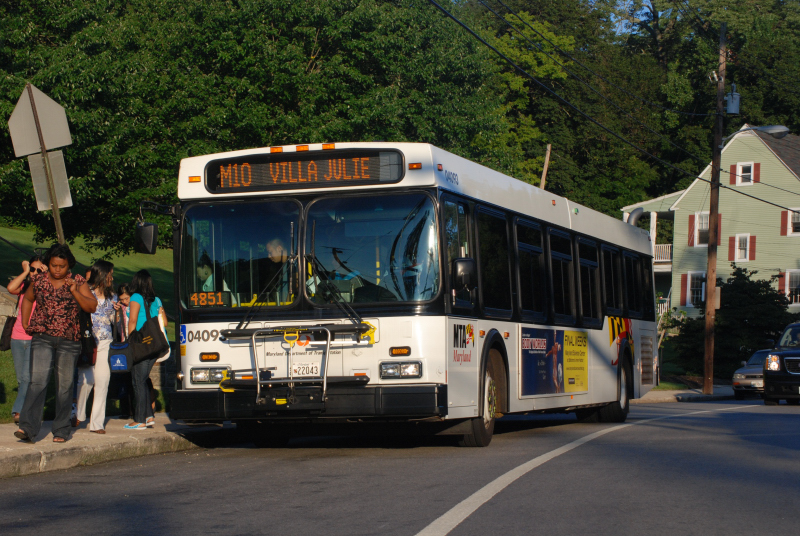
The extension of Route M-10 (now known as Route 60) to Villa Julie College (now known as Stevenson University) was an unplanned change during the Greater Baltimore Bus Initiative

- The new Route 12, replacing service on a branch of Route 8, provided unreliable service to Stella Maris. Riders who at one time had single-seat service on the no. 8 line, had to transfer, and were missing their connections.
- The modified Route 13 did not provide service along Washington Street, Wolfe Street, or Milton Avenue, requiring the elderly to walk up to six blocks.
- Route 44 provided very inefficient service to the Social Security Administration once provided by Route M-6, causing employees of the Baltimore area's largest employer to be late. In addition, no off-peak service was provided to the Social Security campus.
- The elimination of the Route M-6 required the elderly to walk at least several blocks to the nearest bus line.
- Route M-10 provided replacement service for the eliminated Route M-12 to Villa Julie College, but not to the communities of Stevenson and Caves Roads.
- Various lines had very poor schedule adherence. These included nos. 2/10, 8, 9, 20, and 23, and the new no. 40 line. In addition, many reported the no. 40 line had very low ridership. Additionally, studies showed the system had a very poor on-time performance.

== Revisions to Phase I ==
Around New Year's Day 2006, MTA announced that there would be some revisions to the original changes proposed due to various issues. These included:

- More peak hour service would be added to Route 9, which would be extended to International Circle.
- Selected weekday trips on Route 10 (renamed from Route 2/10) and on Route 20 would makes short turns in the Dundalk area in order to improve schedule adherence.
- Route 13 would return to its original route on Washington and Wolfe Streets on most trips, and a new branch would be added to serve Milton Street.
- Route 40 would be extended to Middle River, and its frequency slightly reduced.

Activists were disappointed when no reversals were announced for Route M-6 at this time. However, a handful of Route M-6 trips were reintroduced in March, which was not enough to please activists.

== Phase II ==
In 2006, a Phase II was proposed that was met with even more controversy. This phase was delayed several times for various reasons, and ultimately scrapped in 2007 following the election of Governor Martin O'Malley in favor of incremental changes.

In March of that year, MTA announced that there would be a Phase II of GBBI. In the announcement, it was declared that twenty-three local bus lines would undergo routing and/or scheduling changes, or else be consolidated with other lines, and these changes would take place on June 11, 2006. According to MTA literature produced at the time, these changes were all improvements that would, for the most part, have a positive impact on riders. Then Maryland transportation secretary Robert Flanagan said that only 46 riders would lose their daily bus service.

The plan was heavily criticized, not only because some riders would lose service or else find it more difficult, but because no hearings were being held to get input from riders. Flanagan said that hearings held during the previous year were sufficient, and that those who had concerns about these changes could write letters to MTA to express their views.

The plan was delayed when the 2006 General Assembly wrote language into their budget that stated that no improvements could be made on any MTA bus lines until MTA held a minimum of two hearings, besides several other stipulations.

As a result of the language found in the budget passed by the Maryland General Assembly, the June 11 improvements were delayed. In late June 2006, two hearings were held per requirement. At the hearings, riders mostly voiced concerns pertaining to the negative impact felt by the October 2005 changes, as well as minor details of the planned ones.

A second version of phase II was proposed later in 2006, in which some of the original Phase II proposals were modified based on earlier complaints, but it never took effect, with the exception of additional service being added on five bus lines in October of that year. On October 8, 2006, part of Phase II was implemented. All other plans were scheduled to be implemented on February 11, 2007. However, as Martin O'Malley replaced Robert Ehrlich as Maryland governor, and much of the administration saw changes, MTA has delayed further implementing any part of GBBI in order to give the O'Malley administration a chance to place their stamp of approval upon the changes, but the administration announced it was scrapping the plan on May 9, 2007 in favor of incremental changes three times a year. The first set of changes, which affected 19 bus lines, and were mostly very minor, took place on June 10, 2007.

== February 2008 plans ==
In September 2007, MTA announced a set of hearings that would be held the following month regarding a series of changes to ten lines. This was not considered to be a part of the already canceled GBBI, though some of the changes that were proposed resembled those under GBBI. Most notably, plans included:

- Rerouting Route 11 to Canton and extending Route 36 to replace the southern portion
- Eliminating Route 61 and providing the service on 11
- Realigning Routes 3, 11, and 55 in the Towson area
- Realigning Routes 27 and 98 in the Hampden area
- Changes the route of Route 16 and doubling its peak hour frequency

Additionally, several other changes never included in GBBI were proposed:

- Introducing a new Route 6 that would supplement peak hour service on parts of Routes 5 and 20, which would not be changed
- Modifying Routes 36 (replacing Route 11) and 77 in the Arbutus area to serve a new Wal-Mart Supercenter.
- Splitting Route M-9 into two separate routes, identified as Routes 56 and 59

On February 17, 2008, all these changes were implemented, except Route 61 service continued to operate during peak hours only.

== Changes ==
Route No.	Plan	Outcome
1	Remove section between Mondawmin and Sinai Hospital and provide on a new Route 28. Change routing in South Baltimore.	In 2006, as part of Phase II, a proposal was made to extend service 7 days a week to Sinai Hospital and to modify routing in the downtown area. These changes were implemented in 2008.
2	Combine with Route 10 and extend to Dundalk	Fully implemented in Phase I
3	Increase service on Loch Raven Boulevard corridor, and eliminate all other branches, including service to Sheppard Pratt	No changes made in Phase I. Later proposals included retaining Sheppard Pratt branch, one that involved shortening it to Towson, and another that kept it operating to Sheppard Pratt with routing change in Towson area to replace parts of the modified Route 55, and adding weekend service. The latter was implemented on February 17, 2008.
4	Eliminate portion of route between Franklin Square Hospital and White Marsh; eliminate Yellow Brick Road branch; Operate northbound service through North Point via southbound route, eliminating service on Merritt Boulevard corridor	All plans implemented in Phase I. Franklin Square terminus relocated to CCBC Essex campus, and two daily Yellow Brick Road trips retained.
5	Reroute to bypass Reservoir Hill; operate all trips via Johns Hopkins Hospital area, and eliminate all other branches in this area	No changes made to this line. Proposals in 2006 included providing Reservoir Hill service on another line or a separate branch of this line, but were never implemented. In 2008, a new Route 6 was introduced to supplement service on the east side of this line.
7	Eliminate line, which would require all riders to walk a few blocks to the nearest route, and provide service to Canton on a modified Route 11	No major changes have been made to Route 7. Two proposals in 2006 involved modifying route of Route 7 to Cherry Hill, and not changing the route at all but reducing its frequency to one bus an hour, but neither were implemented.
8	Split into two routes. New route of Route 8 would be from downtown to Lutherville station, and new Route 9 would operate from Lutherville to Hunt Valley. Loveton and Stella Maris branches would be eliminated.	Implemented in Phase I. Service to Stella Maris was retained on a new Route 12, and a private contractor provided service to Loveton.
10	Combine with Route 2 and extend west to Catonsville area. Eliminate portion between Lexington Market and State Center area and service to Sparrows Point and on Wise Avenue.	Fully implemented in Phase I
11	Split route in downtown area, and provide service on southern portion of route on Route 36. Operate Route 11 from GBMC to Canton along a single routing through Rodgers Forge, with a new extension from downtown Baltimore to Canton.	Plan delayed several times, and new versions introduced in 2006 that would extend the route from GBMC to Towson. Implemented on February 17, 2008, with modification to serve a new Wal-Mart Supercenter.
13	Modify routing in East Baltimore to Patterson Park Avenue to simplify routing. Eliminate branches to Social Security and Lower Canton.	Implemented in Phase I. On February 5, 2006, main routing returned to Washington and Wolfe Streets, with new branch created to Patterson Park and Federal Streets.
14	Split route, with all Route 14 operating from Patapsco station to Jumper's hole loop, minus all deviations on selected trips, and a new Route 41 operating the Cromwell station to Annapolis at a reduced level of service and no Sunday service	No such changes have been made to this line
15	Change routing at Walbrook Junction, with new route operating north to Sinai Hospital via route of Route 91 rather than west to Security Square Mall and the Lorraine area; provide service to Security on a modified Route 68. Eliminate all service north of Overlea loop.	No changes made resulting from GBBI. In June 2007, Route 68 was recombined into Route 15, restoring service to Forest Park Avenue, and regular service to White Marsh was provided.
16	Double frequency at all times except on Sundays. Change routing in Rosemont area to Gwynn Falls Parkway and Poplar Grove Street. Eliminate trips via Violetville.	No changes made in 2005. In 2006, the midday and Saturday frequency was improved, and the route change proposal was modified from Gwynns Falls Parkway to North Avenue in order to continue serving Coppin State College. Violetville trips continue to operate. In 2008, the peak hour frequency was doubled.
17	Eliminate all service on this line, except trips between downtown Baltimore and BWI Airport when light rail is not operating. Encourage riders to use Howard Transit service to reach Arundel Mills.	No changes in 2005. In 2006, a new proposal was made that would have kept the line operating, but eliminated service west of Arundel Mills. These changes were no made, but in later years, selected trips to certain locations were eliminated, and the overall level of service was not reduced.
19	Eliminate Joppa Heights and Hickey School branches	No changes were made in 2005. In 2006, two new proposals were introduced. One would have shortened the line to Lexington Market. The other would have split the line into two routes with a coordinated schedule in overlapping areas: the no. 19 line operating along it present Carney route, and a new Route 37 that would operate from Goucher & Taylor to Cherry Hill via the current Route 27 route. No changes have been made to this line.
20	Extend all trips to Security Square Mall. Shift route in Edmondson Village from Old Frederick Road to Edmondson Avenue, and in East Baltimore from Baltimore Street to Fayette Street to overlap with 23 and provide increased service to these streets. Extend all trips to CCBC Dundalk campus.	All changes implemented, except service continues to operate on Old Frederick Road. In February 2006, about half of all weekday trips were shortened to Dundalk and Center Place to improve schedule adherence.
21	No changes planned	No changes made under GBBI. In 2009, route was extended north to Mondawmin.
22	Double frequency at most times. Eliminate Lombard & Kane branch.	Frequency was doubled in October 2006. Lombard & Kane branch was later eliminated.
23	Extend all trips to Route 40 and Rolling Road. Shift routing in downtown area from Saratoga Street to Fayette and Baltimore Streets, and on the west side of Baltimore from Saratoga Street to Franklin and Mulberry Streets. Operate all trips to Fox Ridge and eliminate all other eastern branches.	Modified as planned; however, after complaints from merchants on West Saratoga Street in downtown, service was restored to that area. The Wildwood branch continues to operate, with selected trips operating either to or via Wildwood.
24	No changes planned	Though no changes were originally planned, frequency of service was improved to one bus every hour to settle complaints about the loss of service on 23. This included operating selected weekday trips via Pulaski Business Park. Route 24 buses alternated with those of Route 4, so this has not increased operating costs. In 2009, the line was shortened to Middle River, with Route 4 taking over Martin Boulevard service, and later that year, it was extended from there to Moravia, replacing a portion of Route 33.
27	Discontinue service as Route 27, but provide service on other lines. Extend Route 64 north to Mt. Washington, Route 29 to downtown Baltimore, and provide service in the Cross Country area on a new Route 28. Provide no replacements to service on Roland Avenue or to Seton Business Park or Port Covington.	No changes were made in 2005. In 2006, two other versions of this plan were introduced that provided service in areas originally proposed not to have replacement service, except one plan did not serve Cross Country area. Neither were introduced. In 2008, all Route 27 trips were modified to operate via Falls Road, with Route 98 modified to serve Roland Avenue, a 2006 proposal, while retaining operation of Route 27.
28	New route scheduled to operate from between Mt. Washington and North Avenue light rail stops via portions of Routes 1, 5, and 27.	Route was never introduced. Later proposals provided these services on other lines.
29	Provide bi-directional routing and extend service every 30 minutes into downtown Baltimore along Russell Street	No changes were made in 2005. In 2006, two alternate proposals were introduced that would also have provided bi-directional routing, and would extend the line to Port Covington rather than downtown Baltimore. Neither plan was introduced.
31	Combine line with Route 35. Extend east to White Marsh, eliminating a portion of the route between downtown and Penn Station. Operate all trips to UMBC, discontinuing service to Beltway Business Park. Provide service to Halethorpe on modified Route 77.	All plans implemented, except selected rush hour trips continue to operate to Beltway Business Park area. The line was identified as Route 31/35 for the first three months of operation before assuming the Route 35 designation.
33	No routing changes planned, but improve midday frequency	Though originally no routing changes were planned, the line was extended to Eastpoint Mall in order to serve the Armistead Gardens area, a community previously served by Route 35. This also allowed for a new connection with several other bus lines. No frequency improvements were made until October 2006.
35	Combined with Route 31 and extend west from downtown to UMBC via the Wilkens Avenue corridor. Extend all short turns at Rosedale Industrial Park to White Marsh. Eliminate service via CCBC Essex campus, Rosedale area, Chesaco Park, and Armistead Gardens. Change routing in downtown area.	Fully implemented as planned. Modifications were made in the plans for Routes 4 and 33 to replace service once provided by branches of this route.
36	Extend to Riverview to replace southern portion of Route 11, which was proposed to be split	No changes were made in 2005. Plan was reintroduced in 2006, but not implemented. After being introduced again in 2007, it was implemented in 2008, with a routing change in the Arbutus area to serve a new Wal-Mart Supercenter.
40	New route proposed to provide limited stop service between Security Square Mall and Essex Park-and-Ride lot, mostly along corridors of Edmondson Avenue and Eastern Boulevard.	Service started operating on October 23, 2005. On February 5, 2006, line was extended to Middle River to allow for connections to other bus routes in that area. Frequency was slightly reduced to enable this extension and improve schedule adherence. The route was later branded as "Quickbus," a designation also given to Route 48 introduced in 2009.
44	Extend all trips either to Security Square Mall or Social Security Administration. Eliminate service to Brighton and Rutherford Business Park.	Modified as planned. In later years, the frequency of this service was doubled between Rogers Avenue Metro Subway Station and Rosedale Industrial Park.
50	No changes planned	No changes made
51	Improve weekend frequency and operate all trips to Patapsco station via Baltimore Highlands	No changes made in 2005. In 2006, a plan was introduced to extend the route to Reisterstown Plaza Metro Subway Station and retain some service via Cherry Hill. The extension was to replace a part of Route 27, which has not been modified in this area. No changes have been made to this line. In later years, the frequency of this service was doubled (except on Sundays), with alternating trips via Cherry Hill and Mt. Winans.
55	Improve midday frequency to one bus every 30 minutes, and introduce Sunday service; eliminate trips via Marshfield Business Park.	No changes were made in 2005. In 2006, a new plan was introduced that would replace the portion of the route between the Towson Courthouse and GBMC with Route 3 and 11. No routing changes were made in 2006, but Sunday service was introduced along this new route. On February 17, 2008, the modifications to the route and schedule were made on other days.
61	Discontinue service. While other lines already provide regular service on other parts of the route, there would be no service on Roland Avenue, requiring riders to walk.	No changes were made in 2005. In 2006, a new plan was introduced to provide peak hour service on a new branch of Route 11. In 2007, this plan was proposed again. In 2008, the line continued to operate, but during peak hours only at a reduced frequency.
64	Extend route north to Mt. Washington to replace a portion of Route 27. Shorten Riviera Beach trips to Energy Parkway. Change routing through downtown area to serve some key points. Improve frequency at certain times.	This plan was proposed again twice in 2006, but no changes have been made to the line.
65	Discontinue due to low ridership	Discontinued as planned
68	Change from a short temporary shuttle to a regular route between Security Square Mall and Mondawmin, replacing portions of other routes that were proposed to be modified.	No changes were made. In 2007, this service was reabsorbed by Route 15.
77	Extend all trips to Patapsco station, with routing change to serve areas that had been served by Route 31. Improve midday and Saturday service to one bus every 30 minutes.	Fully implemented in Phase I
86	Discontinue service and encourage riders to transfer to Route 44	Discontinued as planned
91	Discontinue service and provide on other routes. Extend Route 15 to replace portion between Sinai Hospital and Walbrook Junction. No replacement for service was planned on Eutaw Place in Bolton Hill, and riders were encouraged to walk to other lines.	No changes were made in 2005. In 2006, one new plan was introduced that would involve shortening the route in the downtown area, and a revised version involved no routing changes, but a reduction in frequency, with part of the route being supplemented by another line that would have been called Route M-5. No changes have been made to the line since.
97	Reduce service to once an hour, and encourage riders to use other overlapping routes at other times.	No changes were made in 2005. In 2006, a proposal was made to reroute the line through Reservoir Hill rather than Route 5 serving this area, but was later abandoned.
98	Discontinue service	This service was not discontinued. In 2006, it was proposed to change the routing to Roland Avenue where a branch of Route 27 had been operating. This plan was implemented in 2008 after Route 27 was modified to provide consistent routing along Falls Road.
M-1	Operate all trips to the Milford Mill loop, and replace service on Milford Mill Road with the modified Route M-8. Discontinue service to Bellemore Farms.	Fully implemented. Was redesignated Route 52 in 2009 with no routing changes.
M-2	No changes planned	No changes made. Was redesignated Route 53 in 2009 with no routing changes.
M-3	No changes planned in Phase I	In 2006, it was proposed for Phase II of GBBI that this line would be combined with Route M-8, with alternating trips either operating to Randallstown or making short turns at Milford Mill Metro Subway Station, and the midday frequency improved. This was implemented in 2008, with the service being designated as Route 54.
M-6	Eliminate line, and provide service by extending all Route 44 trips to the Security Boulevard area.	Fully implemented in 2005. This was one of the most controversial changes made, as it meant that no service was available along Gwynn Oak Avenue inside the city limits. In March 2006, a handful of Route M-6 trips were reintroduced, and in October 2006, Route M-6 was restored to full-time status, though Route 44 service was not diminished. In 2008, the line was renumbered to Route 57.
M-8	Extend line from Randallstown to Owings Mills Metro Subway Station. Change routing to Milford Mill Metro Subway Station rather than Rogers Avenue Metro Subway Station, and provide service on Liberty Road east of Milford Mill Road on Route M-1.	Was not extended to Owings Mills. However, it was rerouted as planned to the Milford Mill Metro Subway Station. In 2006, a Phase II plan was proposed to combine the line with Route M-3. The latter plan took place in 2008, with the new route identified as Route 54.
M-9	No changes planned in Phase I	When the list of Phase II proposals was announced in 2006, it was proposed that midday and weekend frequencies be improved. This plan was not implemented in 2006. In 2008, The line was split into two separate routes: Routes 56 and 59, both with improved frequencies, and both which continue to operate to this day.
M-10	Eliminate all service on Old Pimlico and Falls Roads and the portion between Reisterstown Plaza and Rogers Avenue Metro Subway Stations. Improve midday service to one bus every 30 minutes, and weekend service to one bus an hour.	Portions of the route to Rogers Avenue Metro Subway Station and on Old Pimlico Road were discontinued as planned, and the line's frequency was increased as planned. However, service to Greenspring Station not only continued to operate, but was improved in frequency. In addition, peak hour trips were extended to Villa Julie College to replace service on Route M-12.
M-12	Discontinue service	Line was discontinued as planned. Peak hour trips on Route M-10 were extended to Villa Julie College to offset complaints about loss of service to this location.
M-17	Discontinue portions of the route via Owings Mills Corporate Campus and T. Rowe Price. Introduce light night service to Rosewood Center to replace that provided by Route 102.	Fully implemented. In 2009, in conjunction with the closure of Rosewood Center, Route M-17 was discontinued. Route 59 was extended to provide service on Red Run Boulevard, and Route service to other parts of the route were not replaced.
