= LocalLink 94 (BaltimoreLink) =

Bus route operated by the Maryland Transit Administration

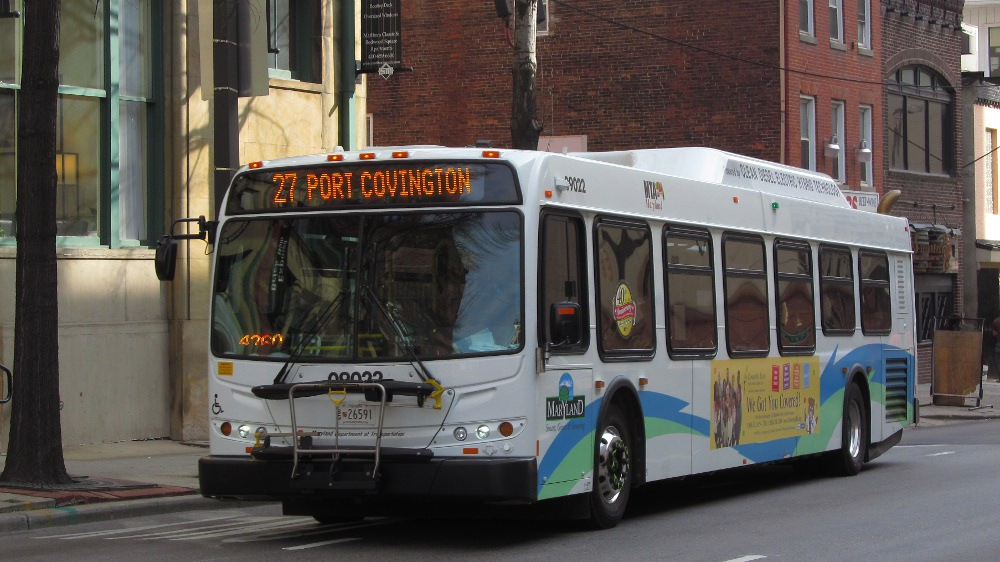

Overview
- System: Maryland Transit Administration
- Garage: Bush; Northwest
- Status: active
- Began service: 1982
- Predecessors: Route 27; Bus Route 10; No. 25 Streetcar

Route
- Locale: Baltimore City
- Communities served: Levindale; Mt. Washington; Cross Keys; Hampden; Remington; South Baltimore
- Landmarks served: Pimlico Race Course; Fort McHenry
- Other routes: 1, 3, 5, 7, 8, 10, 11, 13, 14, 15, 17, 19, 20, 21, 22, 23, 29, 30, 33, 35, 36, 38, qb40, 44, qb46, qb47, qb48, 51, 52, 53, 54, 57, 58, 59, 60, 61, 64, 91, 98, 120, 150, 160

Service
- Frequency: Every 40 minutes Every 20-30 minutes (peak)
- Weekend frequency: Every 30-40 minutes
- Operates: 5:00 am to 1:00 am

LocalLink 94, formerly Route 27 is a bus route operated by the Maryland Transit Administration in Baltimore. The line currently runs from the Sinai Hospital in northwest Baltimore to Fort McHenry in South Baltimore through downtown. The line also serves the communities of Levindale, Mt. Washington, Cross Keys, Hampden, and South Baltimore. The bus route is the successor to the 10 Roland Park, 12 Westport, and 25 Mount Washington streetcar lines.

== History ==
The northern portion of the present Route 27 is nearly identical to the No. 25 streetcar line that operated during Baltimore's streetcar era. The Hampden line in Baltimore was the first electric streetcar that operated in the United States. The no. 25 designation was used for service on Falls Road up until 1959. Service on Falls Road was provided by Route 10 between 1959 and 1982, then by Route 27 since 1982.

The no. 25 streetcar started operating in 1897. The initial route of the line was along the Falls Road corridor (current location of the Baltimore Streetcar Museum). The ultimate goal of the construction of the line was to provide rail service to Pennsylvania. The line then operated to Gwynn Oak Junction (later the terminus of several other streetcar and bus lines), and had branches to Cheswolde and Pikesville. In 1901, the route was modified to serve Remington and Hampden. In 1923, the line was shortened from Pikesville to Key Avenue in Cheswolde. In 1936, Camden Station was made into the southern terminus. .

The conversion from a streetcar line to buses took place in stages in 1949. First, the no. 25 bus line operated from Mt. Washington to Camden Station, and the nos. 47 and 48 streetcars from Mt. Washington to Key Avenue and Belvedere loop respectively (service to Gwynn Oak was provided by other lines). The Mt. Washington to Belvedere section became a part of the no. 25 bus in 1951. No. 47 service would eventually be absorbed into Bus Route 5, and later become a separate line identified as Route 58. The no. 25 bus line would become a part of Route 10 in 1959, which it would remain a part of until 1982. There were two routings through North Baltimore between 36th Street and Coldspring Lane: one along Falls Road, and the other via Roland Avenue (the original routing of Route 10). This structure remained in place as part of Route 27 until 2008.

In 1970, the no. 25 designation was assigned to a line that is operated by the Baltimore Streetcar Museum.

In 1982, Route 10, which at the time was operating from Pimlico to Dundalk, was once again split to allow better schedule adherence. But with no. 25 being unavailable due to its use for the streetcar museum, the new line for the north end was given the No. 27 designation that it has today. The two lines at the time of the split had overlapped between State Center and Little Italy, though both lines have since been modified, and their routes presently do not overlap, but do intersect in the downtown area.

The no. 27 designation had previously been used for one other service in Baltimore transit history. The Washington Boulevard streetcar line, which started operating in 1905, was designated no. 27. This was converted into an electric trolley bus in 1938, and a rubber tire bus in 1957, when it absorbed then Route 52, and was extended to Lansdowne. In 1959, this route was combined with Bus Route 11, and remained a part of Route 11 until 2008, when the service was split from Route 11, and became a part of Route 36.

In 1992, in conjunction with the opening of the Central Light Rail Line, Route 27 was truncated to Camden Yards. Service between Howard Street and Little Italy, and selected trips to Canton were eliminated. The line's frequency was also reduced, as the line duplicated light rail service.

In 1996, Route 28 was eliminated except on Sundays. Service on Route 28 was provided by other routes from this time on, and selected Route 27 trips were extended south of Camden Yards to the Cherry Hill Light Rail Stop. Additionally, selected late night trips were extended to either the Cherry Hill community or to Baltimore Highlands.

Additional modifications in the coming years resulted in all trips being extended to Port Covington via Cherry Hill, and Route 27 in the Cherry Hill area became a supplement to service offered by Route 29.

In 2004, the main Baltimore Greyhound bus terminal relocated from the center of the city, an area accessible by Metro, light rail, and many bus lines, to an area off Russell Street where Route 27 had been the bus serving the area since 1996. At that time, service provided in this area by Route 27 was more limited compared with the overall route. Local officials, concerned about the lack of public transportation to this location, which many access by public transportation, scrambled to find a way to provide service to the new transportation center.

Soon after the terminal's opening, service on Route 27 in this area was increased, and the route of buses passing through the terminal's area was modified to deviate into the station's parking lot.

In 2005, as part of the Greater Baltimore Bus Initiative, a comprehensive overhaul plan for the region's transit system, MTA proposed to discontinue Route 27, and to provide all of its service on other lines. These included:

- An extension on Route 15 to Sinai Hospital that would have served Belvedere Avenue.
- A new Route 28 (no relation to the former Route 28) that would have operated between Sinai and Mt. Washington.
- Route 64 would have been extended north from North Avenue to Mt. Washington.
- Route 29 would have provided all service along Russell Street and to Cherry Hill.
- Initially, there would be no service to Seton Business Park, on Roland Avenue, or to Port Covington.

As a result of public outcry pertaining to Route 27 and other routes, in 2006, MTA delayed any changes to Route 27 and made the following modifications to the proposals:

- Route 15 would not be rerouted to Sinai Hospital, but Route 91 would continue to serve Belvedere Avenue along with a new Route M-5, that would have served Mt. Washington.
- Route 98 Hampden Shuttle would be modified to serve a portion of Roland Avenue where many senior citizens live. This change was implemented on February 17, 2008.
- A new proposed Route 37 would have served Russell Street and Cherry Hill, and Route 29 would have been extended to Port Covington.

In June 2007, GBBI was canceled. In October of the same year, MTA proposed new changes that route keep Route 27 operating, while making minor changes that included:

- Consistently running service along Falls Road through Roland Park, and modifying Route 98 as proposed earlier to serve Roland Avenue.
- Modifying route from 27th Street to 28th and 29th Streets in Remington in order to improve ease of operating buses.

In February 2008, the first of these changes took place, while the latter did not.

In 2017, as a part of the BaltimoreLink system redesign, Route 27 was discontinued. The central portion of the route, along Falls Road, from Levindale to Downtown, was replaced by LocalLink 94, replacing most of the former route. The Belvedere Avenue portion was replaced by LocalLink 31, the Seton Business Park section connecting to the Reisterstown Plaza SubwayLink station was replaced by LocalLink 82, the Russell Street portion south of Downtown was replaced by LocalLink 73, and the Cherry Hill portion of the route was replaced by LocalLink 26.

== June 2011 ==
Adjust service frequency to 40 minutes for mid-day service on weekdays only.

== December 2007 beating ==
On December 4, 2007, a highly publicized assault occurred on a Route 27 bus in which four people were attacked, including the bus operator. Nine youths – all between ages 14 and 15 and students of the Robert Poole Middle School – were charged. Because all nine suspects were African American and the victims (except for the bus operator) were white, the incident was originally investigated as a hate crime. Hate crime charges were later dropped after no evidence could be found that the attack was racially motivated, but assault charges against the students have remained. The attack has prompted local and state lawmakers to consider legislation that would stiffen penalties for attacking the operator or a passenger on a bus.

=== Incident ===
Shortly before 3 pm local time, a Route 27 bus left the Robert Poole Middle School, bound for Port Covington in South Baltimore. It is what is called a "school tripper" route, that is, a route designated for use by local school students, though other passengers may board on the route as well.

At some point on either West 36th Street or Chestnut Avenue, Sarah Kreager and her boyfriend Troy Ennis boarded. Kreager and Ennis attempted to find empty seats, but when they located one at the rear of the bus, one of the suspects refused to allow her to sit. At this point, the accounts become contradictory: one of the suspects says that Kreager spat at one of the female suspects and used the N-word, and that Ennis produced a knife. Kreager, in an interview after the incident, firmly denies uses either spitting or using the epithet. At this point, the suspects attacked Kreager and Ennis, the bus halted after rounding the corner of West 33rd Street and Chestnut Avenue, and the operator called the Maryland Transit Administration Police for assistance. After this, an unidentified senior citizen on board attempted to intervene, as did the operator; the operator was also attacked and the passenger threatened. During the melee, the bus's rear exit door, one rear window and two seats were damaged. Kreager was thrown off the bus by the suspects with injuries to her face. Ennis attempted to get her back on board, at which point the MTA Police arrived. Their statement contains no mention of any spitting or use of racial epithets. The suspects were arraigned, charged with aggravated assault and destruction of property, and released to their parents' custody for a hearing schedule for January 8, 2008. Because they are being charged as juveniles, they have not been publicly identified by the media, except for two suspects. Britny Carter said that Kreager did spit but denies any racial hostility was involved. Nikita McDaniels was a 15-year-old student at Robert Poole Middle School during the beating and claimed that Sarah Kreager assaulted her by spitting on her and hitting her. These charges were brought against Kreager three weeks after the incident. Soon afterward, the prosecutors dropped the assault charges claiming there was no evidence to substantiate McDaniels' claim. On April 23, 2008, McDaniels was sentenced to serve time in a secure juvenile detention facility. Two other co-defendants were sentenced to home detention. In his decision, Juvenile Court Judge David Young said it was one of the worst cases he had seen in his 23 years on the bench.

According to the Baltimore Sun, during the trial for five of the accused students, Assistant State's Attorney Dawn Jones accused McDaniels of being the "queen bee" in a "beehive", by taking up two seats on the crowded bus and then harassing Kreager after she boarded and sat down.

"That's my homegirl's seat", Kreager testified that McDaniels said.

Kreager then moved closer to Ennis, who responded, "You know how these kids are these days. Our daughter has more manners, Jones told the judge. "That's when Nikita McDaniels rose and said: 'What you say? You white bitches think you own everything.'"

Kreager was hospitalized at Sinai Hospital with what the police report says were two broken bones in her left eye socket, two deep cuts on the top of her head and other cuts on her neck and back. Her face was bruised and her left eye was swollen shut. No other victims or suspects needed to be hospitalized. Officials, concerned for her safety, placed Kreager in witness protection.

Nikita McDaniels was convicted and sentenced to a secure juvenile facility outside of Maryland.

=== Additional incidents ===
On December 10, 2007, Patrick Green and Robert Rothe, both white, were assaulted by a group of young African-American men on the Number 64 Bus in South Baltimore. Green and Rothe believe the crime was racially motivated.

Other incidents occurred in the month on Bus Routes 51, M-1, and 15.
