= Baltimore Metro SubwayLink =

Rapid transit line in Baltimore, Maryland, US

Metro SubwayLink

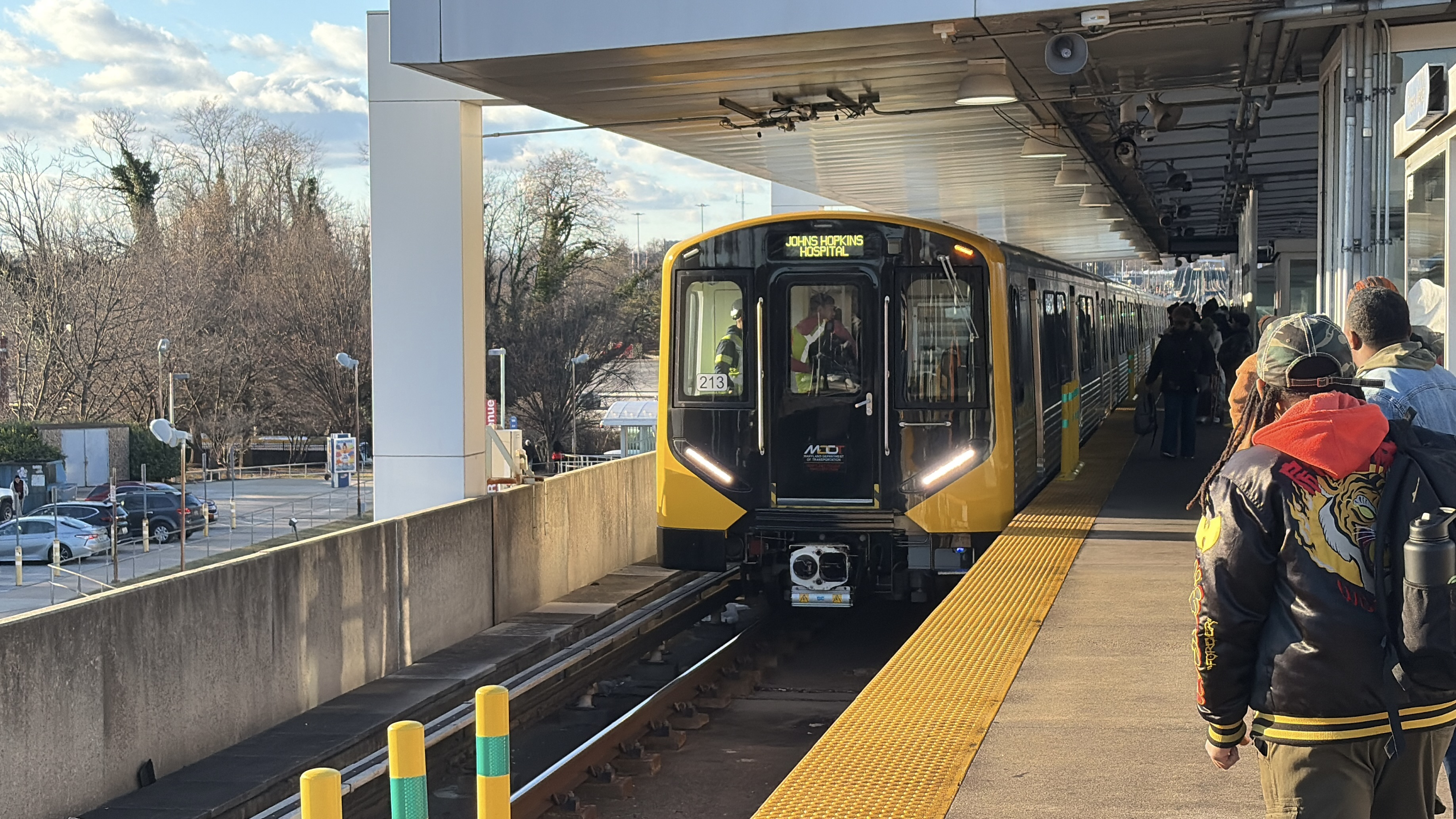
- Metro SubwayLink train entering Rogers Avenue station and bound for Johns Hopkins Hospital station

Overview
- Owner: Maryland Transit Administration
- Locale: Baltimore, Maryland, U.S.
- Termini: Owings Mills (west); Johns Hopkins Hospital (east)
- Stations: 14
- Website: mta.maryland.gov/metro-subway

Service
- Type: Rapid transit
- Depot: 5801 Wabash Avenue
- Rolling stock: 100 Budd Universal Transit Vehicle cars 78 Hitachi cars (Phasing in)
- Daily ridership: 15,000 (weekdays, Q2 2026)
- Ridership: 4,610,400 (2025)

History
- Opened: November 21, 1983; 42 years ago

Technical
- Line length: 15.4 mi (24.8 km)
- Track length: 34 mi (55 km)
- Number of tracks: 2
- Character: Underground, surface, elevated
- Track gauge: 4 ft 8 1/2 in (1,435 mm) standard gauge
- Electrification: Third rail, 700 V DC
- Operating speed: 70 mph (110 km/h)
- Highest elevation: 28 ft (8.5 m)
Route map
Metro SubwayLink highlighted in green

The Baltimore Metro SubwayLink, commonly referred to as the Baltimore Metro or Metro Subway, is a rapid transit line serving Baltimore, Maryland, and its northwestern suburbs, operated by the Maryland Transit Administration. The segment in Downtown Baltimore is underground, while most of the line outside the central city is elevated or at surface grade. In 2025, the line had a ridership of 4,610,400, or about 15,000 per weekday as of the second quarter of 2026.

== History ==
The origins of the subway lie in the Baltimore Area Mass Transportation Plan published in 1965, which envisioned six rapid transit lines radiating out from a central city loop. Planning studies from 1968 proposed a rail transit system 71 mi (114 km) long.

As the vision was translated into reality, the original concept was trimmed to a 28 mi (45 km) system in the Phase 1 plan, published in 1971. This plan involved two of the original six lines: a northwest line from Downtown Baltimore to Owings Mills and a south line to Glen Burnie and the airport. Phase 1 was approved for funding by the Maryland General Assembly in 1972. In response to lobbying by Anne Arundel County residents, the MTA eliminated the south line from Phase 1 plans in 1975; the Baltimore Light RailLink was later built over much of the planned south line corridor.

When the Baltimore Metro Subway opened on November 21, 1983, only the "Northwest" line of the 1965 plan had come to fruition. This 7.6 mi (12.2 km) segment provided service between Charles Center in Downtown Baltimore and the Reisterstown Plaza shopping center in the northwest of the city. On July 20, 1987, a 6.1 mi (9.8 km) addition extended the line from Reisterstown Plaza to Owings Mills in Baltimore County, with a portion running in the median of Interstate 795. A further extension of 1.6 mi (2.5 km) from Charles Center to Johns Hopkins Hospital opened on May 31, 1995. When the system opened, it became the largest single user of Susan B. Anthony dollar coins in the United States. Once the project was completed in 1995, the total cost for the Baltimore Metro Subway stood at $1.392 billion.

The current system is 15.4 mi (24.8 km) long, consisting of 6.2 mi (10 km) underground, 2.2 mi (3.5 km) elevated, and 7.0 mi (11.3 km) at grade. Eight of its 14 stations are underground, at depths from 52 ft (16 m) to 112 ft (34 m) below street level. Its elevated stations stand from 25 ft (7.6 m) to 28 ft (8.5 m) above ground. The system was renamed to the Metro SubwayLink as part of a rebrand of all MTA services announced in 2015.

The installation of underground cellular service in the Metro SubwayLink tunnels began in September 2021 and was originally expected to be completed by June 2022. As of December 2024, the work has not been completed.

== Operation ==
=== Route ===
The Metro SubwayLink has a single line that is shaped like a reverse "J". Trains head south underground from Johns Hopkins Hospital, turn west as they pass under Baltimore's central business district, turn north at Charles Center, and ultimately turn to face northwest at State Center. The route leaves its tunnel northwest of Mondawmin station, entering an elevated structure that parallels Wabash Avenue and the Hanover Subdivision along the former Western Maryland Railway route. The route then enters the median of Interstate 795, which it occupies until it reaches the Owings Mills terminus.

Trains heading towards Johns Hopkins Hospital are referred to as "eastbound", while trains heading towards Owings Mills are "westbound".

=== Schedules ===
A trip from one end of the line to the other takes about half an hour. Headways range from eight minutes during daytime peak to fifteen minutes late at night and on weekends. Trains run from 5 a.m. to midnight on weekdays, and from 6 a.m. to midnight on weekends.

=== Fares ===
As of 2024, the fare prices for MTA buses, the Metro SubwayLink, and the Light RailLink travel are as follows:

Type	Full fare	Senior/Disability	Student	Mobility
Single trip	$2.00	$1.00	$1.50	$2.20
Day Pass	$4.60	$2.30	–	–
Weekly Pass	$22.00	–	–	–
Monthly Pass	$77.00	$23.00	–	–

- Note: People who qualify for paratransit services can use the Metro SubwayLink free of charge.

=== Performance and Ridership ===
For fiscal year 2010, the MTA reported 95% on-time performance for the system. It averaged 3.0 passenger trips per revenue mile, with a total of 13.4 million passenger trips for the year. Vehicles operated at an average cost of $11.59 per revenue mile. Local buses, in comparison, performed at a cost of $13.57 per revenue mile.

Baltimore Metro Subway RailLink Ridership 1995 – present
Fiscal Year	Average Weekday Ridership	Annual Ridership	Ref.
1995		10,947,200	
1996	44,800	12,250,300	
1997	45,800	12,733,300	
1998	46,900	12,996,800	
1999	48,300	13,401,400	
2000	48,800	13,665,900	
2001	48,800	13,857,600	
2002	46,000	13,947,500	
2003	25,600	7,509,800	
2004	19,000	4,697,600	
2005			
2006		13,136,100	
2007	53,000	13,555,500	
2008	53,300	14,179,700	
2009	51,800	13,215,300	
2010	56,800	13,742,000	
2011	50,200	14,939,700	
2012	50,100	15,399,400	
2013	48,500	15,034,400	
2014	48,000	14,555,100	
2015	42,700	12,948,400	
2016		11,241,200	
2017		10,812,100	
2018	13,700	8,270,600	
2019	36,600	7,325,500	
2020	5,800	2,861,300	
2021	5,600	1,667,400	
2022	6,200	1,988,300	
2023			
2024	12,800	5,487,000	
2025	14,700	4,610,400	

Key
Record high
Record low

=== Stations ===
The Metro SubwayLink has a total of 14 stations. All stations except Owings Mills, Old Court, and Milford Mill are located in Baltimore.

Location	Distance (mi / km)	Station	Connections
Owings Mills	0.0 (0)	Owings Mills	LocalLink: 87, 89
Lochearn	3.6 (5.8)	Old Court	LocalLink: 37, 83
Lochearn	5.4 (8.7)	Milford Mill	LocalLink: 81, 85
Glen	6.1 (9.8)	Reisterstown Plaza	LocalLink: 82
Arlington	7.1 (11.4)	Rogers Avenue	LocalLink: 28, 30, 31, 34, 80, 82, 89
Arlington	8.3 (13.4)	West Cold Spring	LocalLink: 28, 82
Mondawmin	10.1 (16.3)	Mondawmin	CityLink: NV LM YW; LocalLink: 22, 26, 29, 82, 83, 85, 91
Penn-North	10.8 (17.4)	Penn-North	CityLink: LM GD; LocalLink: 85
Upton	11.3 (18.2)	Upton–Avenue Market	CityLink: LM
Mount Vernon	12.5 (20.1)	State Center	Light RailLink (at Cultural Center); CityLink: LM YW; LocalLink: 54, 73; Express BusLink: 154; MTA Commuter bus: 410
Downtown	13.3 (21.4)	Lexington Market	Light RailLink (at Lexington Market); CityLink: BL; LocalLink: 54, 71, 80, 94; Express BusLink: 105, 115, 120, 150, 154, 163; MTA Commuter bus: 320
Downtown	13.8 (22.2)	Charles Center	CityLink: OR GR SV RD PR; QuickLink: 40; LocalLink: 51, 56, 65, 67, 71, 76, 78, 95; Express BusLink: 103, 105, 120, 150, 160; MTA Commuter bus: 210, 215, 310, 410, 411, 420; CCC: Purple
Downtown	14.4 (23.2)	Shot Tower	CityLink: OR BL PR; QuickLink: 40; LocalLink: 54, 67, 76, 78; Express BusLink: 105, 150, 154, 160; CCC: Green
Middle East	15.4 (24.8)	Johns Hopkins Hospital	CityLink: PK GD BR LM; LocalLink: 21, 56; Express BusLink: 105, 115, 120, 160; MTA Commuter bus: 210, 215, 310, 320, 411, 420; CCC: Green

=== Connecting services ===
Most Metro SubwayLink stations are served by a number of MTA bus routes. In 1984, just months after Metro first started operating, many feeder routes were created that were given the designation of a letter (M, P, or R) followed by a number. In 1987, many of these routes were renamed, and only the prefix "M" was used. Over the years, the number of M-lines had shrunk, as many of the routes were consolidated. In 2008, routes designated with the letter "M" were renamed to plain two-digit designations. Finally, on August 30, 2009, the last four were either renumbered or eliminated, with no routing changes made; they continue to act as feeder routes to the Metro SubwayLink.

There is no direct connection from the Metro SubwayLink to the Light RailLink or MARC commuter rail. However, the Metro SubwayLink's Lexington Market Station is a 200-yard (180 m) walk from the Light RailLink stop of the same name, and the State Center station is about 1.5 blocks away from the Light RailLink's Cultural Center station. Baltimore Penn Station is about a one-half mile walk from State Center, and MARC Camden Station is about five blocks from Lexington Market Metro station.

== Rolling stock ==
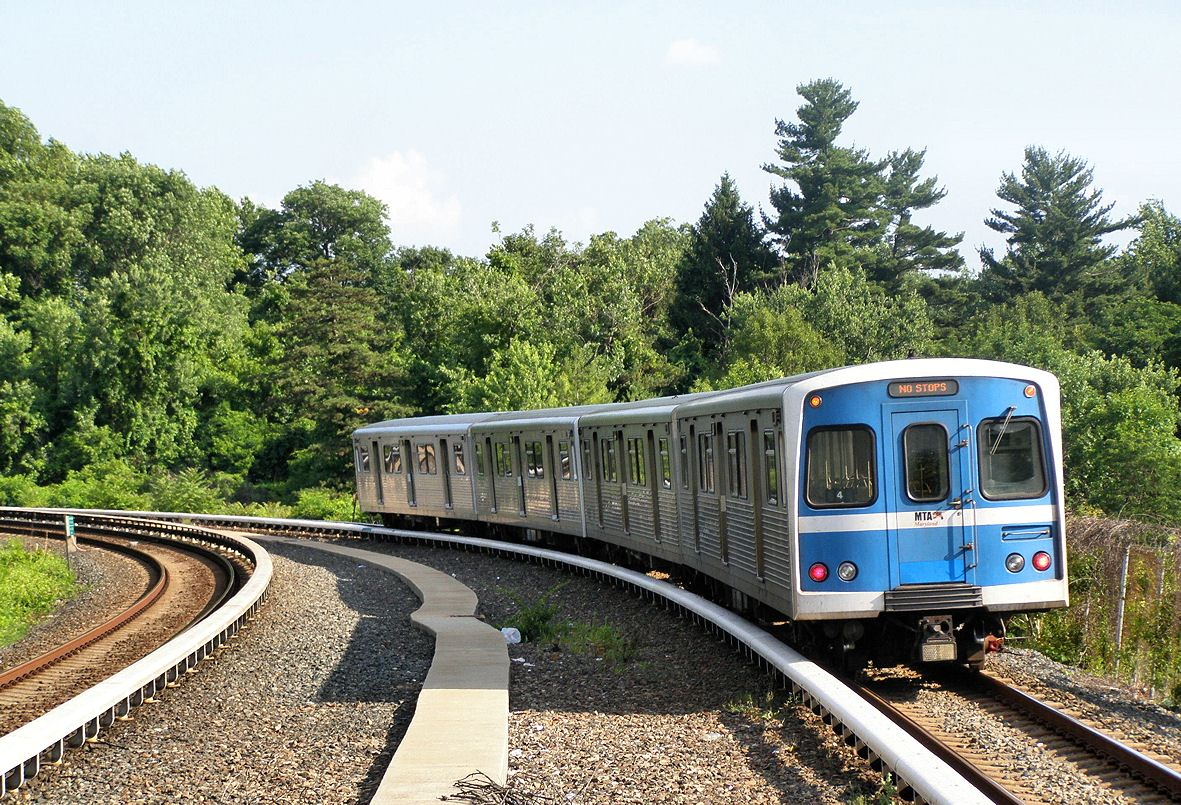
A Budd Universal Transit Vehicle on the Baltimore Metro SubwayLink departing Milford Mill station

As of 2026, the line currently uses cars manufactured by the Budd Company in Northeast Philadelphia as well as new cars presently being manufactured by Hitachi Rail Italy in Hagerstown, Maryland.

Most of the 100 Budd-built cars were delivered in 1983 with a supplementary set of essentially identical cars being purchased in 1986 for the line expansion. The cars, marketed by Budd as the Universal Transit Vehicle, are identical to those formerly used on the Miami Metrorail; the two agencies built their systems at the same time and saved money by sharing a single order. A number of Budd cars have been retired.

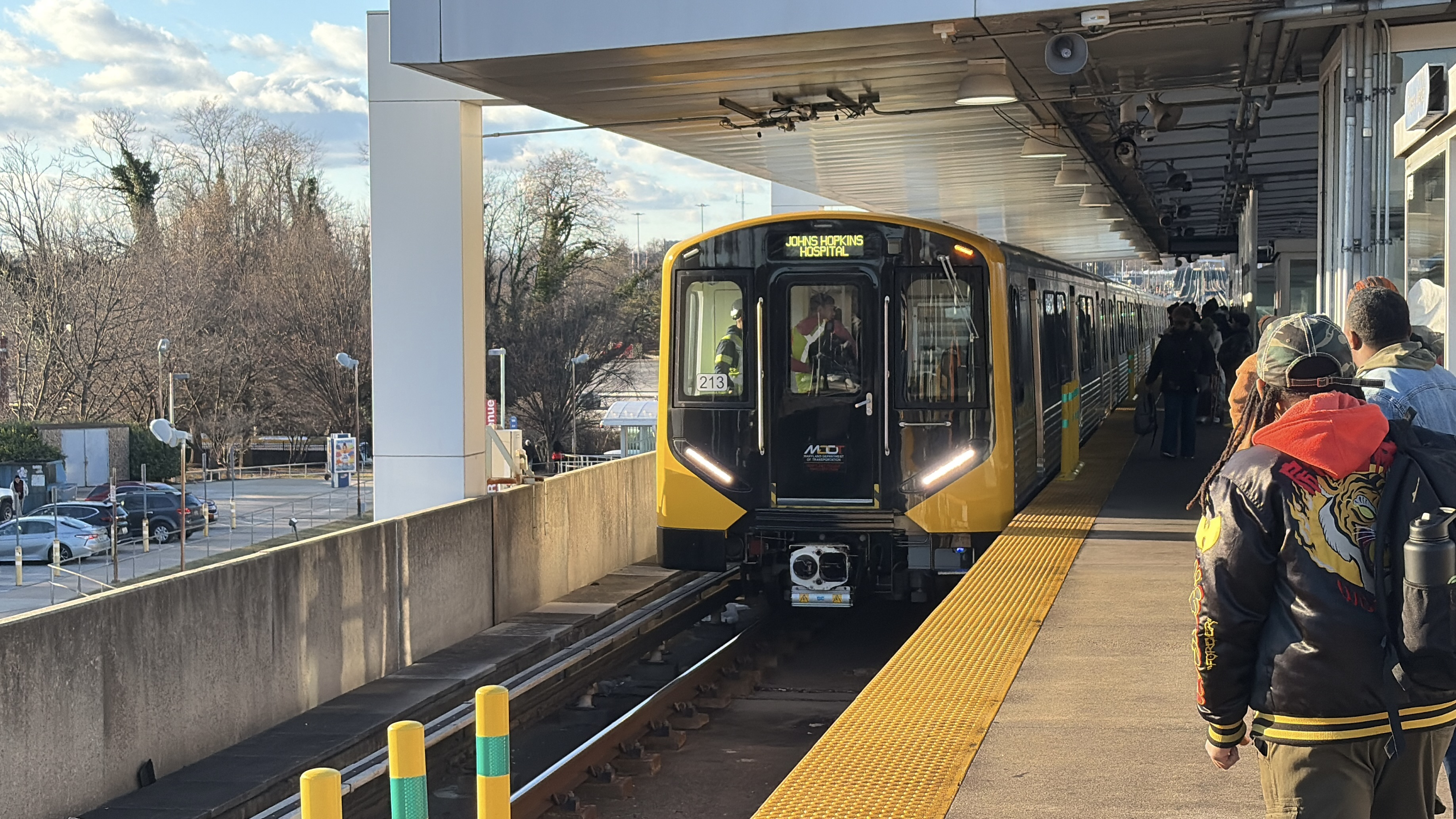
The first trainset of 78 new Hitachi railcars entering Rogers Avenue station on the ceremonial first run, January 7, 2026.

Trains draw power from the electric third rail. The cars are 75 feet (22.86 m) long, 10 feet (3.05 m) wide, and have a top speed of 70 mph (110 km/h). Cars are semi-permanently attached in married pairs and joined up to form 4-car trains, which is the normal train length. 6-car trains are used during peak rush hours. Each car can hold up to 166 passengers (76 seated, 90 standing).

The original fleet had a significant overhaul between 2002 and 2005. Seats were reupholstered, and the floors were replaced. External destination rollsigns were replaced with LED displays; internal systems that display train destinations and upcoming stop announcements were also installed.

In July 2017, MTA announced the purchase of 78 new railcars from Hitachi to replace the entire fleet, similar to those used on the Miami Metrorail. The railcars generate electricity while braking, thus allowing the energy to power certain train systems and enabling the system to become more energy efficient. The first Hitachi cars were delivered in October 2023; the replacement of the rolling stock is set to occur in phases from 2026 to 2027.

On January 7, 2026, the new Hitachi railcars received a ceremonial run, and the first 6 car trainset officially entered revenue service on Friday January 9. The new railcars are also compatible with CBTC.

== Incidents ==
On February 11, 2018, the MTA announced a month-long closure of the entire system to complete emergency track repairs identified during a safety inspection. An aboveground portion of the system had already been shut down due to emergency inspections and repairs. The system reopened on March 9, 2018.

On December 26, 2022, in Rogers Avenue station, a railcar partially derailed at 6:00PM EST. 5 passengers were later taken to the hospital with non-life-threatening injuries. A woman on TikTok later posted a video of the derailment.

In the summer of 2023, a fire damaged a portion of the subway system, prompting a brief closure. Regular service resumed a few days later.

== See also ==
- Transportation in Baltimore
- List of metro systems
- List of United States rapid transit systems by ridership
- Baltimore Light RailLink
