= Route 31 (MTA Maryland) =

Bus route operated by the Maryland Transit Administration

Overview
- System: Maryland Transit Administration
- Garage: Bush, Eastern
- Status: active
- Began service: 2015

Route
- Locale: Fells Point; Baltimore County
- Communities served: Canton, Inner Harbor
- Other routes: 1, 3, 5, 7, 8, 10, 12, 13, 15, 19, 21, 23, 35, 36, qb40, qb46, qb47, qb48, 61, 64, 91, 120, 150, 160

Service
- Level: Daily
- Frequency: Every 15-30 minutes
- Weekend frequency: Every 30-45 minutes
- Operates: 5am-1pm

Route 31 is a bus route operated by the Maryland Transit Administration in Baltimore and its suburbs. The line currently runs from State Center Metro Station S east through downtown Baltimore to CCBC Dundalk. The main roads on which the line operates are MLK Boulevard, Pratt Street, Lombard Street, and Boston Street. The line serves the communities of Canton, Fells Point.

The bus route is the successor to the 11 Canton, 20 CCBC Dundalk,

== History ==
On February 22, 2015, as part of the first phase implementation of the Bus Network Improvement Project. Service on the eastern portion of the route 20 & 11 was picked up by the new Route 31 for trips to Dundalk via Canton & Inner Harbor. and by new In addition Dundalk Marine Terminal and the Amazon Warehouse was picked up the new Route 26.

Previously, Route 31 was used for a route that ran largely along the Wilkens Avenue corridor from the University of Maryland Baltimore County to Penn Station; it has since been replaced by an extension of Route 35.

== See also ==
- Route 11 (Local service)
- Route 20 (Local service)
- Route 26 (Local service)
