= Baltimore bus terminals =

Greyhound Terminal

General information
- Location: 2110 Haines Street; Baltimore, Maryland 21230; United States of America
- System: MTA Bus station
- Bus routes: 2
- Bus operators: Greyhound Lines; Peter Pan Bus Lines; BayRunner Shuttle; MTA Maryland bus service; UMBC Transit
- Connections: 27; UMBC Transit: Downtown Route

Construction
- Structure type: at-grade
- Parking: yes
- Accessible: yes
Location

The city of Baltimore, Maryland has had a succession of several terminals for interstate bus travel.

The main terminal for Greyhound, built in 2016, is located at 2110 Haines Street just off Russell Street south of Downtown Baltimore.

This location was chosen following community opposition to construction at a site near Penn Station. Then-mayor Martin O'Malley, who had originally wanted the Penn Station site because of its central location to public transportation in the city, bowed to this pressure.

Following the opening of the current location in August 2016, local and state politicians, including O'Malley, then-governor Robert Ehrlich, and Lieutenant Governor Michael Steele scrambled to provide better public transportation to the new site. As a result, the Maryland Transit Administration increased service on MTA Maryland bus route 27, the closest bus line to the new location, and rerouted the line into the terminal.

== Baltimore Travel Plaza ==
Baltimore Travel Plaza

General information
- Location: 5625 O'Donnell Street Cutoff; Baltimore, Maryland 21224
- System: MTA Bus station
- Owner: Maryland Transit Administration
- Line: 31

History
- Closed: 25 January 2011
Location

The Baltimore Travel Plaza was a bus terminal located at 5625 O'Donnell Street off I-95 in southeast Baltimore. Several bus companies used this location, including Greyhound and Chinatown bus lines. On January 25, 2011, the Baltimore Travel Plaza ceased operations, with Greyhound and Peter Pan shifting service to their new terminal on Haines St.

== Former bus stations ==
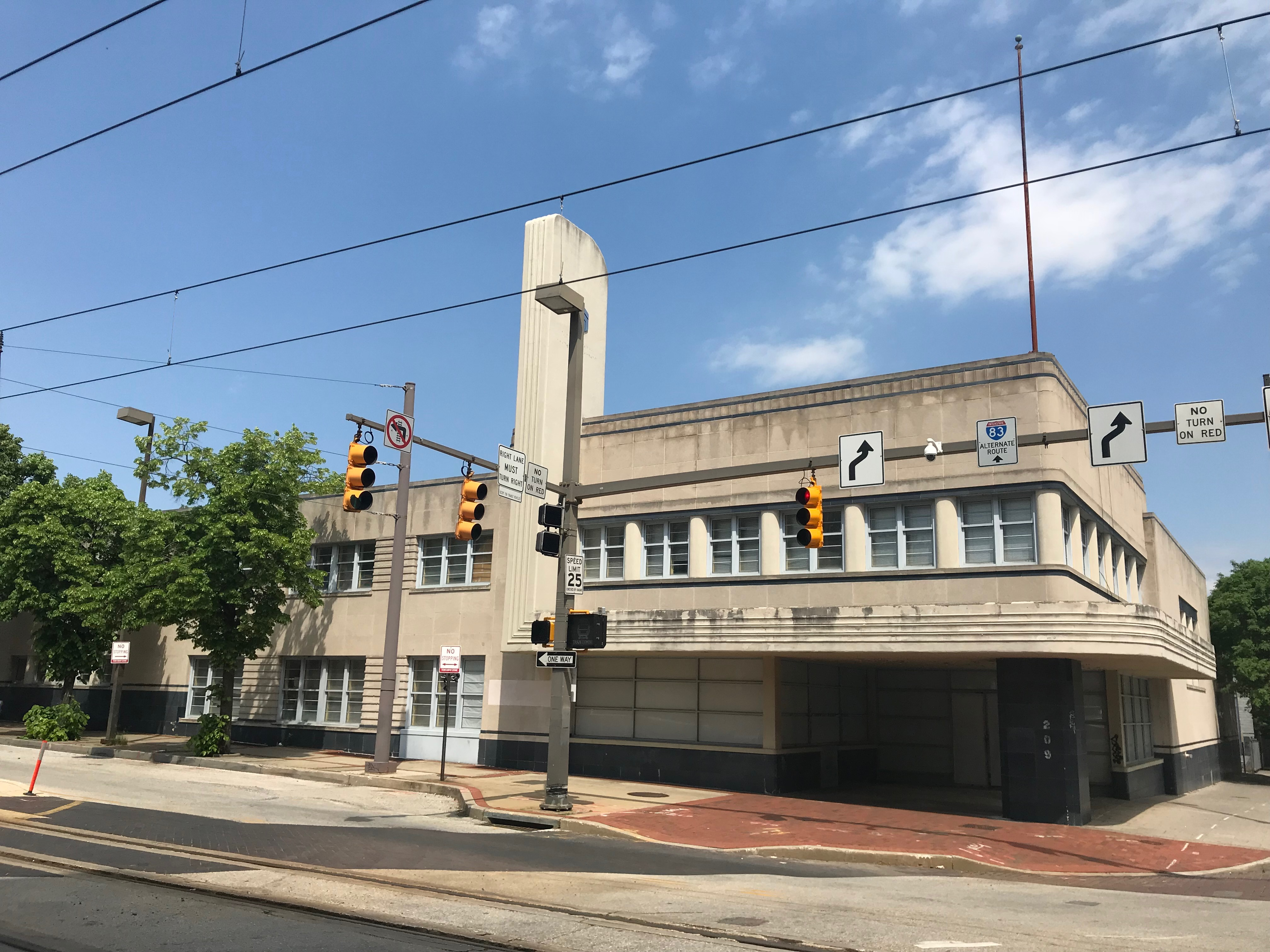
601 N. Howard Street

Prior to the construction of the Baltimore Travel Plaza, the main Greyhound station was located at 210 West Fayette Street, with the buses entering from Merion Street. This had been the Trailways terminal until the acquisition of the Continental Trailways company by Greyhound.

The former Greyhound terminal prior to that was at 601 North Howard Street at West Centre Street, with the buses entering from Howard St. and exiting from Centre St.
