= LocalLink 89 (BaltimoreLink) =

Bus route operated by the Maryland Transit Administration

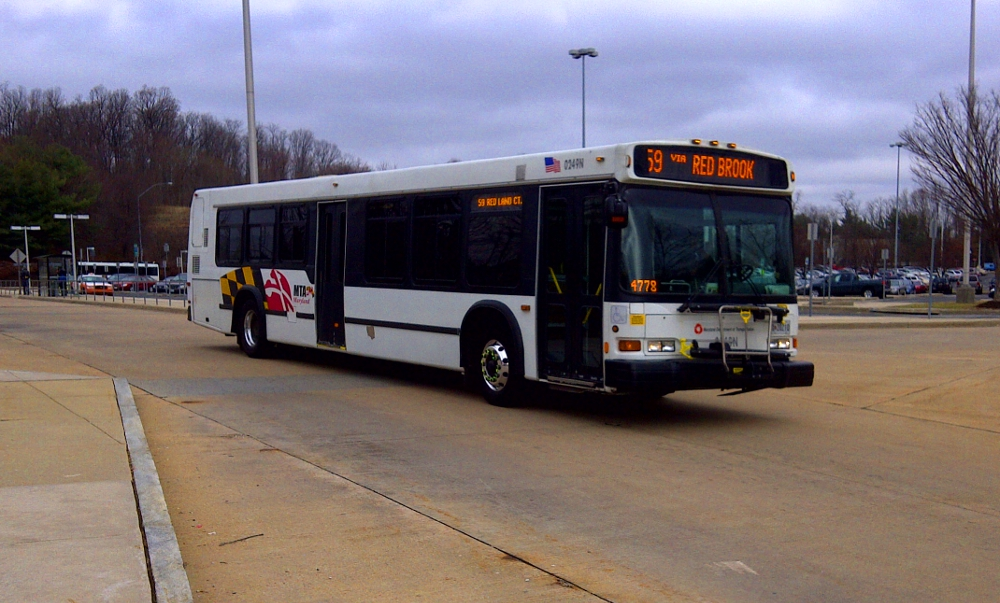

Overview
- System: Maryland Transit Administration
- Garage: Northwest
- Status: active
- Began service: 2008
- Predecessors: Route 59 (2008-2017); Route M-9 (1987-2008); Route P-4 (1984-1987); Route 7 (1959-1984); Route 5/7 (1948-1959); Route M (1932-1948); No. 5 Streetcar (1916-1932)

Route
- Locale: Baltimore City; Baltimore County
- Communities served: Pikesville; Garrison
- Landmarks served: Reisterstown Road Plaza
- Other routes: 27, 53, 54, 56, 58; 60

Service
- Level: Daily
- Frequency: Every 35 minutes Every 30 minutes (peak)
- Weekend frequency: Every 35 minutes
- Operates: 5:00 am to 1:00 am

LocalLink 89 is a bus route operated by the Maryland Transit Administration in Baltimore and its suburbs, mostly along Reisterstown Road. The line currently runs from the Reisterstown Plaza Metro Subway Station to the Owings Mills Town Center. The line replaced original Route 59 under BaltimoreLink, and was a split-off from Route M-9, and resembles the pre-1997 route of Route M-9. It is the successor to several other bus routes and streetcars.

== History ==
Route 59 has only been operating since February 17, 2008. Prior to this date, the no. 59 designation was never used for a bus operating on Reisterstown Road. The only other bus route in Baltimore transit history that had the no. 59 designation was the Colgate Shuttle, a service that operated during rush hour from 1948 to 1952. But the Reisterstown Road corridor between Pikesville and Owings Mills has a history of being served by many other bus routes and streetcar lines.

=== 1916 to 1932 ===
Service on Reisterstown Road was provided by the No. 5 Streetcar Line, which ran from Emory Grove to Patterson Park, providing all transit service than offered along any parts of Reisterstown Road. The no. 5 streetcar had the most northern point of all Baltimore streetcars. At this time, the Owings Mills area was minimally developed.

=== 1932 to 1948 ===
In 1932, the no. 5 streetcar was shortened to Pikesville. Service between Pikesville and Emory Grove was provided by Bus Route M (no relationship to M-lines).

=== 1948 to 1959 ===
In 1948, the no. 5 streetcar was completely converted to a bus operated. The new line was identified as the no. 5/7 line.

=== 1959 to 1984 ===
The no. 7 bus line provided service on all parts of Reisterstown Road from Glyndon to Pennsylvania and North Avenues, then continued along Pennsylvania Avenue to downtown Baltimore and Canton along the same route as the present no. 7 line. Even after the no. 7 line was shortened in 1984 in favor of shorter Metro feeder buses, the no. 7 line continued to operate along this full route until 2001, when the Metro connection buses started to operate 7 days a week, some 24 hours a day.

=== 1984 to 1987 ===
Following the opening of the Baltimore Metro, a new series of feeder buses were developed to bring riders into Metro stations. During this time, Route P-4 operated along virtually the same route as Route 59, with the exception of the deviation into the Owings Mills Metro Station, which at the time, did not exist. Additionally, Route P-1 overlapped along Reisterstown Road, then operated to Reisterstown.

=== 1987 to 1997 ===
During the years 1987 to 1997, Route M-9 operated over the present route of Route 59. The line started by running from Reisterstown Plaza to the Owings Mills Metro Subway Station at most times, with trips before 9 AM continuing to the Owings Mills Town Center. After 9 AM, service to between the Metro Station and Town Center was provided by a shuttle identified as Route M-17, no relationship to the current Route M-17 that serves other parts of the Owings Mills area.

In June 1992, the Route M-17 shuttle was discontinued, and service was provided by extending all trips on Routes M-9 and M-16 to the Owings Mills Town Center. At the same time, Route M-15, which duplicated service on Route M-9 and several other routes, was discontinued. The only section of Route M-15 that was not covered by any other bus lines was a branch of selected trips to Business Center at Owings Mills. To replace this service, six daily M-9 trips were extended to this location. Currently, this service is not provided by Route 59, but by Route M-17.

=== 1997 to 2008 ===
In 1997, Route M-9 was combined with Route M-16. A single line was formed that operated between the Reisterstown Plaza Metro Subway Station and Reisterstown, with all trips operating via the Owings Mills Town Center. A new Route M-17 was formed to provide service on all special branches.

In 1999, the destination signs of the buses bound for Reisterstown were marked "Glyndon" in order to avoid confusion with those in the opposite direction marked "Reisterstown Plaza Station".

In September 2001, all Metro connection buses, except those that operated weekdays only, were expanded to operate 7 days a week for the first time. The schedules of all at the time, including Route M-9, matched those of Saturday service.

=== 2008 to 2017 ===
On February 17, 2008, the M-9 line was split into two new routes: nos. 59 and 56. These routes resemble the former original Routes M-9 and M-16, respectively. This was done in order to improve schedule adherence on both routes.

On August 30, 2009, Route M-17 was discontinued and service along Red Run Boulevard was replaced by extending peak hour service on Route 59 to Red Land Court. These trips do not enter the Owings Mills Mall parking lot (Mill Run Circle), but pass Owings Mills Mall on Red Run Boulevard.

=== 2017 to present ===
BaltimoreLink renamed Route 59 to Route 89, and expanded the route to have a southern terminus at Rogers Avenue station.
