= Route 31 (disambiguation) =

Route 31 is a name for roads and highways in many countries.

Route 31 may also refer to:

- Route 31 (MTA Maryland), a bus route in metropolitan Baltimore, Maryland, U.S.
- Route 31 (WMATA), a bus route on Wisconsin Avenue in Washington, D.C., U.S.
- London Buses route 31, UK
- 31 Balboa, a bus route in San Francisco
