= Route 15 (MTA Maryland) =

Bus route operated by the Maryland Transit Administration

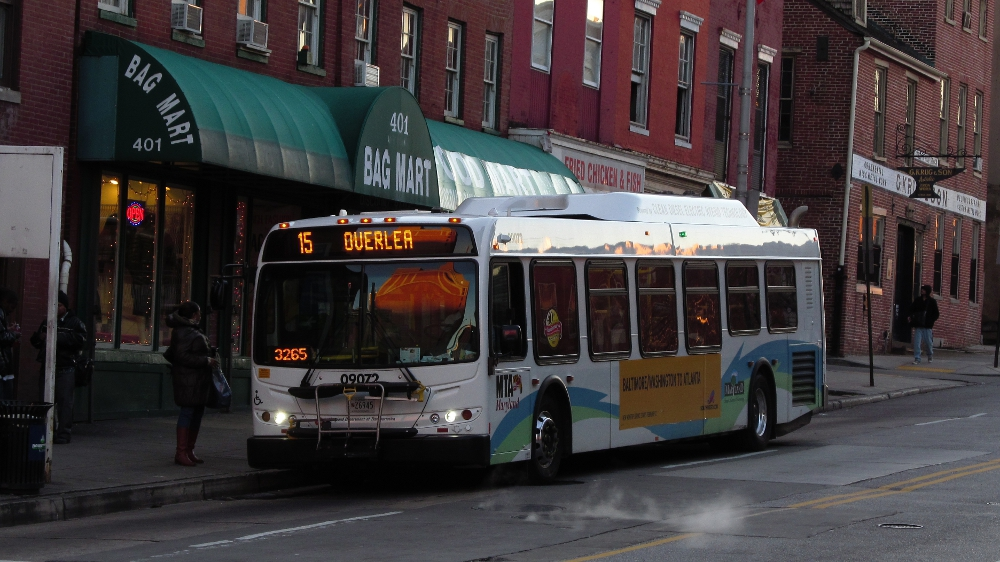

Overview
- System: Maryland Transit Administration
- Garage: Bush; Kirk
- Status: discontinued
- Began service: 1963
- Ended service: 2017
- Predecessors: Nos. 4, 15, and 35 streetcars

Route
- Locale: Baltimore City; Baltimore County
- Communities served: Woodlawn; Dickeyville Historic District; Forest Park; Rosemont; Poppleton; Belair-Edison; Gardenville; Fullerton
- Landmarks served: Social Security Administration; Kernan Hospital; Leakin Park; Lexington Market
- Other routes: 1, 3, 5, 7, 8, 10, 11, 13, 16, 19, 20, 21, 22, 23, 27, 33, 35, 36, 38, qb40, 44, qb46, qb47, qb48, 50, 51, 55, 57, 58, 61, 64, 77, 91, 99, 120, 150, 160

Service
- Level: Daily
- Frequency: Every 15 minutes Every 12 minutes (peak)
- Weekend frequency: Every 15-30 minutes
- Operates: 24 Hours a Day

Route 15 was a bus route operated by the Maryland Transit Administration in Baltimore and its suburbs. The line currently runs from Security Square Mall, Westview Mall, Windsor Hills, or Walbrook Junction (all in West Baltimore or Baltimore County) through downtown Baltimore and northeast to Overlea, with selected peak hour express trips to Perry Hall. The main roads on which it operated include Security Boulevard, Windsor Mill Road, Forest Park Avenue, Poplar Grove Street, Edmondson Avenue, Saratoga Street, Gay Street, and Belair Road, and was one of the most heavily used bus routes operated by the MTA.

The bus route was the successor to the 4 Edmondson Avenue and 15 Gay Street streetcar lines.

On June 18, 2017, as a part of the BaltimoreLink network redesign, Route 15 was discontinued, and replaced by the CityLink Brown, LocalLink 80, LocalLink 79, LocalLink 34, and Express BusLink 115 routes.

== History ==
Route 15 is the successor to two streetcar lines, numbered in 1899: the west half of Route 4 on Bloomingdale Road and Edmondson Avenue and the east half of the original Route 15 on Gay Street and Belair Road.

The Baltimore City Passenger Railway opened its Gay Street Line to Boundary Avenue (now North Avenue) on December 11, 1861, and through-routed it with the Baltimore Street Line to West Baltimore (now part of Route 20) as the Red Line. The line was equipped with cable traction on July 23, 1893, and electrified in 1899.. An extension along Belair Road was built by the Central Passenger Railway in the late 1890s, branching off their Preston Street Line via Milton Avenue, and the Baltimore, Gardenville and Bel Air Electric Railway later opened an extension to Overlea.

The North Baltimore Passenger Railway (later part of the Baltimore Traction Company) through-routed its Edmondson Avenue Line and Monument Street Line (now part of Route 35, no relationship to the earlier Route 35 on the west side that was absorbed by Route 15 in 1966). An extension of the Edmondson Avenue Line was built north along Poplar Grove Street and Bloomingdale Road to Walbrook by the Baltimore and Powhatan Railway and west along Windsor Mill Road by the Gwynn Falls Railway. It was electrified in 1894.

The numbers 15 and 4 were assigned to the two routes in 1899. It was not until December 31, 1935 that Route 4 was truncated to downtown, and the portion on Monument Street became part of Route 6. Route 15 was split on May 9, 1948, when the Route 20 bus replaced both the Edmondson Avenue streetcar and the old Route 20 streetcar to Point Breeze. Route 4 was absorbed by Route 15 on September 18, 1954, and on November 2, 1963 it was replaced by buses.

In 1966, Route 15 absorbed Route 35, which operated from Walbrook Junction to Lorraine. The new full route of the line ran from Lorraine to Overlea. Later expansions were made into the suburbs to accommodate future development.

=== Service north of Overlea ===
In 1915, bus service began between Overlea and Belair called "jitney buses." These operated for several years.

MTA began providing service north of Overlea in 1973, when a new Route 15A was formed that provided express service between Kingsville and downtown along Belair Road. This line, in 1991, was renamed to Route 43, which also provided service to White Marsh. Overall, service on Belair Road in Baltimore County was always very limited. But in 1992, service on Route 43 line was provided as express trips on Route 15. The White Marsh branch was initially provided on Route 66 until that line was eliminated 7 months later, at which time a White Marsh branch was formed on Route 15.

In 1998, due to low ridership, Kingsville service was shortened to Perry Hall, and reduced to just seven trips daily on weekdays.

In 2005, as part of the Greater Baltimore Bus Initiative, a comprehensive overhaul plan for the region's transit system, MTA proposed to eliminate all service north of Overlea. This plan was not implemented. Some of the opposition came from a blind man who would have lost all bus service in his community. In 2007, service to White Marsh was improved.

=== Forest Park Avenue service ===
In 2003, due to the anticipated closure of the Forest Park Avenue bridge, Route 15 was modified in the Windsor Hills area. Buses, instead of operating through the Windsor Hills community, were diverted more directly on Windsor Mill Road, bypassing this area. A new Route 68 was formed to provide shuttle service between Walbrook Junction and Windsor Hills. This plan was then intended to be temporary.

In 2005, as part of the Greater Baltimore Bus Initiative, MTA proposed that both Routes 15 and 68 would be modified. Under this plan, Route 15 would have been combined with Route 91 and extended north from Walbrook Junction to Sinai Hospital. Route 68 would have been converted into a feeder bus that would have operated between Security Square Mall and the Mondawmin Metro Subway Station. Route 15 would no longer have operated west of Walbrook Junction, and the streets of Windsor Hills would not have had any bus service.

Due to public outcry, these changes were not made. Protests included a 73-year-old man who complained that removing bus service from Forest Park Avenue and being forced to walk a greater distance to reach the nearest line could be life-threatening.

On April 5, 2007, following the reopening of the Forest Park bridge, Route 68 was merged back into Route 15, and Route 15 returned to its old route through Windsor Hills on all trips west of Walbrook Junction. In addition, White Marsh service on weekdays and Saturdays was increased to one bus an hour.

In June 2011, all local service beyond Overlea was eliminated, but express service to Perry Hall continued as scheduled, and White Marsh service replaced by an extension of Route 58.

== See also ==
- Route 47 (supplements east side service during peak hours)
