= CityLink Navy (BaltimoreLink) =

Bus route operated by the Maryland Transit Administration

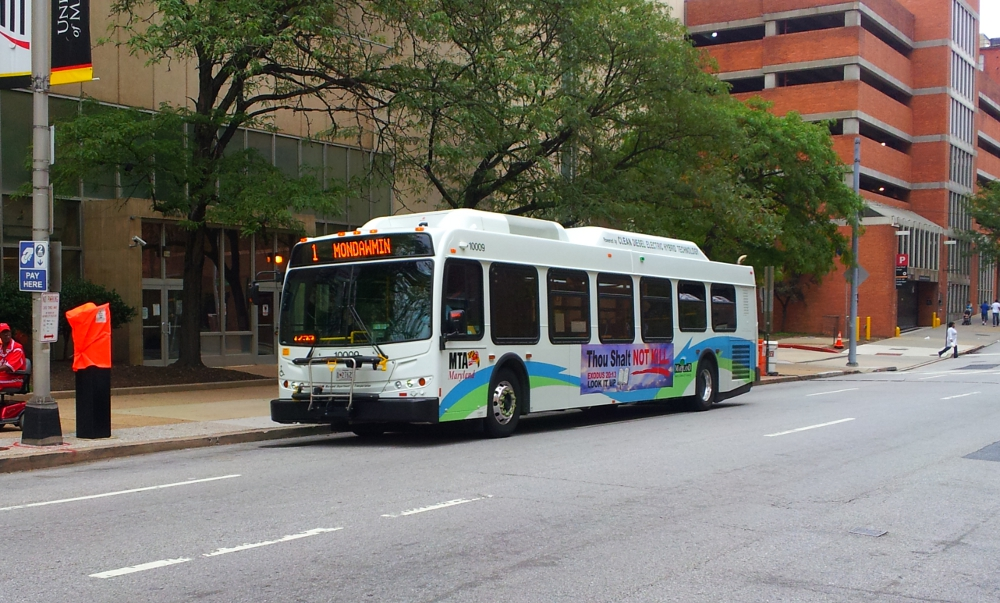

Overview
- System: MTA BaltimoreLink
- Garage: Bush
- Status: active
- Began service: 1947
- Predecessors: Nos. 0, 1, and 2 Streetcars

Route
- Locale: Baltimore
- Communities served: Coldspring Newtown; Mondawmin; Downtown Baltimore; Federal Hill
- Landmarks served: Druid Hill Park; Mondawmin Metro Subway Station; Inner Harbor
- Other routes: 3, 5, 7, 8, 10, 11, 15, 16, 19, 20, 21, 22, 23, 27, 30, 33, 35, 36, 38, qb40, 44, qb46, qb48, 51, 52, 53, 54, 61, 64, 91, 98, 120, 150, 160

Service
- Level: Daily
- Frequency: Every 30-35 minutes Every 15-20 minutes (peak)
- Weekend frequency: Every 40-60 minutes
- Operates: 5:00 am to 1:00 am

CityLink Navy (abbreviated NV) is a bus route operated by the Maryland Transit Administration in Baltimore. It replaced Route 1 in 2017. The bus route is the successor to the 1 Gilmor Street, 2 Carey Street, and 2 Fort Avenue streetcar lines.

== History ==
The Citizens' Passenger Railway obtained a franchise from the city on June 25, 1868 to build a line from Druid Hill Park to Patterson Park, using Fayette Street west of downtown and roughly including what became the No. 1 and 2 streetcar lines. The People's Passenger Railway built the Druid Hill Avenue Line and a line to Fort McHenry via Fort Avenue; the two companies merged with several others in 1888 to form the Baltimore Traction Company. Cable cars began running on the Gilmor Street Line to downtown on May 23, 1891, and the Carey Street Line was electrified on May 15, 1893. Electricity was added to the Fort Avenue Line on July 23, 1893, and the Gilmor Street Line was converted from cable to electricity on March 3, 1895. (The Druid Hill Avenue and Patterson Park routes were combined as the No. 0 Line at about the same time.)

About 1894, the Carey Street and Fort Avenue cars were through-routed. The Baltimore Consolidated Railway was organized on June 18, 1897 as a merger of the Baltimore Traction Company with the City and Suburban Railway, which included the Guilford Avenue Elevated. Gilmor Street cars were sent north along the elevated on November 11, 1897. At that time, the routes were as follows:

1 from Druid Hill Park to Greenmount Avenue: via a counter-clockwise loop on Retreat Street, Francis Street, and Fulton Avenue, then Pennsylvania Avenue, Cumberland Street, Gilmor Street, Fayette Street, Guilford Avenue, North Avenue, Charles Street, and 25th Street, with half the cars using St. Paul Street and 31st Street.
2 from Druid Hill Park to Fort McHenry: via the same loop as the 1, Pennsylvania Avenue, Cumberland Street, Carey Street, Mosher Street, Carrollton Avenue, Fayette Street (returning via Fayette Street directly to Carey Street), Charles Street, and Fort Avenue.

Changes were made to the 1 on May 12, 1901, when it was swapped with the No. 17 Streetcar (the St. Paul Street Line) and moved from Charles Street to St. Paul Street north of North Avenue, ending at 25th Street. The 1 was extended east over 25th Street to Greenmount Avenue on May 1, 1903. The route south from Druid Hill Park was changed to Fulton Avenue and Mosher Street on December 1, 1926, the day the No. 21 (Preston Street–Caroline Street Line) was taken off these tracks and rerouted south to Lombard Street; the old route on Gilmor Street north of Mosher Street was abandoned. On August 1, 1929, the No. 11 (Bedford Square Line), which had been a branch of the 17, was moved onto the Guilford Avenue Elevated, and became a branch of the 1, running between Druid Hill Park and Bedford Square. The 1 was truncated to west of downtown, and the 11 replaced with buses, on June 22, 1947 (the No. 8 Towson Line was temporarily moved onto the Elevated), and on May 9, 1948, when most routes were removed from Baltimore Street, the 1 was sent south from downtown via Sharp Street in order to replace the No. 19 Harford Avenue Line. The 1 was replaced with trackless trolleys on August 1, 1948.

A much smaller number of major changes were made to the 2. The first was on August 20, 1918, when it was moved from Fayette Street to Baltimore Street via Carrollton Avenue. On May 9, 1948, it was moved back, since most routes were removed from Baltimore Street that day. Trackless trolleys replaced streetcars on December 11, 1948. The two routes continued separate operations until June 21, 1959, when buses replaced the trackless trolleys on both. The new Route 1 began with the old 1 on Fulton Avenue, but cut east on Riggs Avenue to reach the old 2 (Carey Street and Cumberland Avenue). From downtown it followed the old 2 to Fort McHenry; no route replaced the short Sharp Street leg of the 1.

== As a bus line ==
The no. 1 bus continued to follow the Druid Hill Park-Fort McHenry routing until 1982, when selected hourly weekday trips were extended from Druid Hill Park to Sinai Hospital along Greenspring Avenue. In 1993, all midday trips were rerouted to Sinai Hospital.

In 1998, all other trips were extended from Druid Hill Park to the Mondawmin Metro Subway Station.

In 2005, as part of the Greater Baltimore Bus Initiative, it was first proposed in Phase I that the service along Greenspring not be provided by Route 1, which would have operated between Mondawmin and Fort McHenry only, but rather by a new Route 28 that would have been created that would have served Reservoir Hill as well and terminated at the North Avenue Light Rail Stop and not operated downtown. This plan was never implemented.

In Phase II of GBBI, it was proposed that Route 1 continue to serve Greenspring Avenue with increased frequencies of service and late night and weekend service in this area. Also, a proposal was made to change the routing in South Baltimore. This change was implemented in February 2009.

On June 18, 2017, the bus system was rebranded to The BaltimoreLink and split into three lines: CityLink, LocalLink, and the Express BusLink. The CityLink runs on main city streets 24/7, the LocalLink buses operate radially around residential areas, and the Express BusLink offers limited-stop service from area to area.

On August 27, 2023, the short turn at Dundalk-Center Place was changed to a short turn to Bayview Medical Center, following CityLink Blue.
