= CityLink Brown (BaltimoreLink) =

Bus route in Baltimore

- Overlea - Downtown
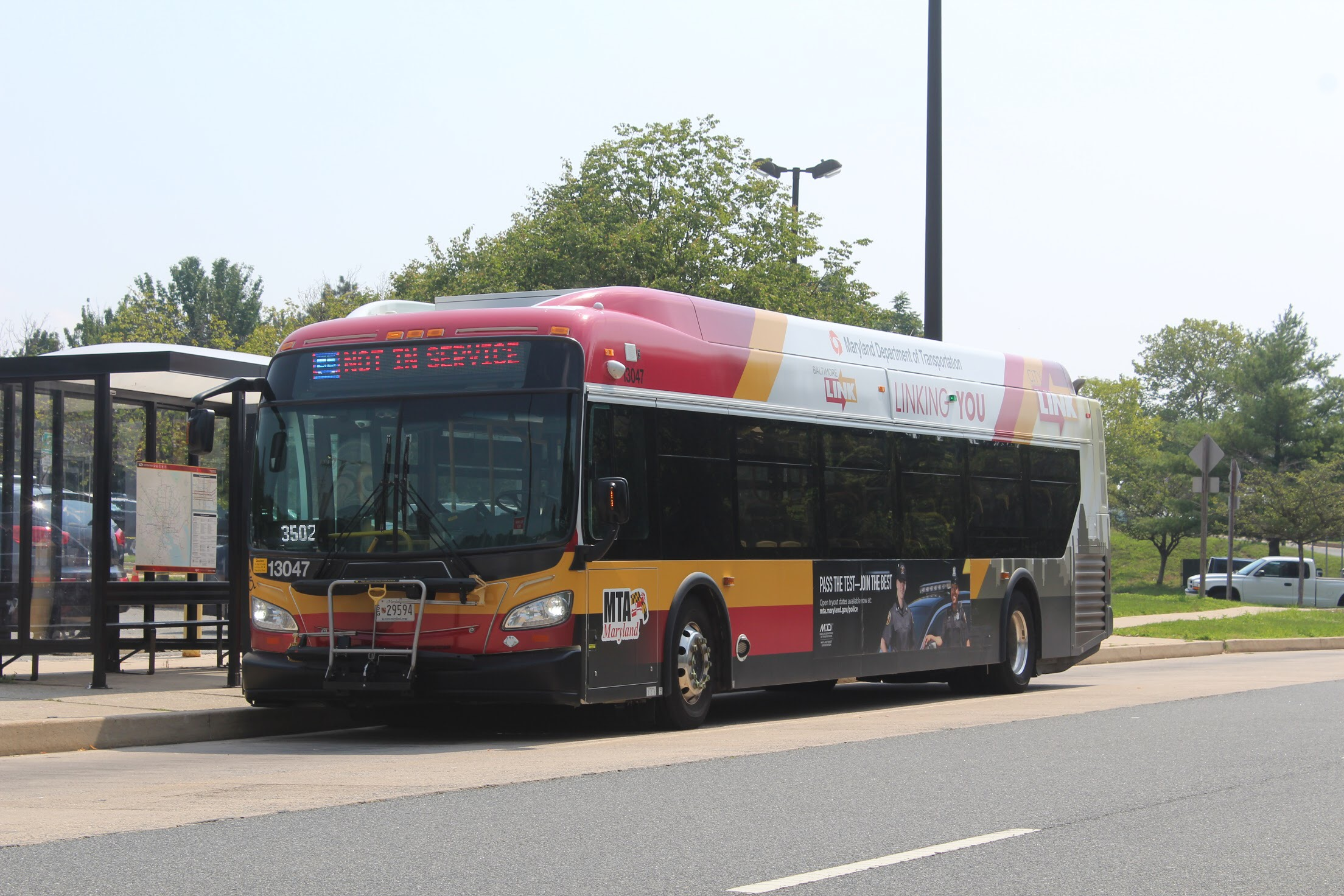
- CityLink Brown bus on layover at White Marsh

Overview
- System: MTA BaltimoreLink
- Status: Active

Route
- Locale: Baltimore City; Baltimore County
- Start: UM Medical Center
- Via: Pratt Street (EB), Lombard Street (WB), Broadway, Belair Road
- End: Overlea
- Length: 7.8 miles (12.6 km)

Service
- Frequency: Frequent Daily Service / 24 hours
- Ridership: 1,444,463 (2022)

CityLink Brown (abbreviated BR) is a bus route operated by the Maryland Transit Administration between Downtown Baltimore City, and Overlea, Baltimore County, or Gardenville, Baltimore County. Northbound trips on the route depart from University of Maryland Medical Center, at the intersection of South Greene Street and West Pratt Street in Downtown Baltimore, and terminate at the intersection of Belair Road and East Overlea Avenue just outside the eastern Baltimore City boundary.

On August 27, 2023, the route was truncated from White Marsh Mall to Overlea, with service between those two points replaced by an extension of Route 33.
