= Transportation in Baltimore =

Baltimore's transportation system is a complex multimodal network serving the city of Baltimore, Maryland.

== Maryland Transit Administration ==
The Maryland Transit Administration (MTA) operates the region's primary transit services:

=== MTA BaltimoreLink ===
A unified local transit network owned and operated by the State of Maryland through the Maryland Transit Administration (MTA) that offers three main services:

- A large bus network: Nearly 80 individual routes divided into three service categories: CityLink (12 high-frequency, color-coded lines), LocalLink (over 50 neighborhood routes), and Express BusLink (peak-hour commuter lines).
- One subway line: Metro SubwayLink (connecting Owings Mills to Johns Hopkins Hospital).
- One light rail system: Baltimore Light RailLink (connecting Hunt Valley to BWI Airport and Cromwell Station).

=== MARC Train ===
MARC Train is a separate regional commuter rail system managed by the MTA that connects Baltimore to Washington, D.C., and outlying suburbs. It has two commuter rail lines: Penn Line and Camden Line.

Baltimore counts with 3 rail stations: two are situated on infrastructure owned by Amtrak (Baltimore Penn Station and West Baltimore station), and one is situated on infrastructure owned by CSX Transportation (Camden Station).

== Baltimore City Department of Transportation (BCDOT) ==
The City of Baltimore independently operates two free local transit services:

- A free bus network: The Charm City Circulator, which runs four distinct downtown shuttle routes (Green, Purple, Orange, and Banner).
- A free water shuttle: The Harbor Connector routes, which ferry passengers across 3 points in the Inner Harbor.:

== Amtrak ==
Amtrak is the Inter-city rail company that connects Baltimore with other cities and states.
