= CityLink Pink (BaltimoreLink) =

Bus route operated by the Maryland Transit Administration

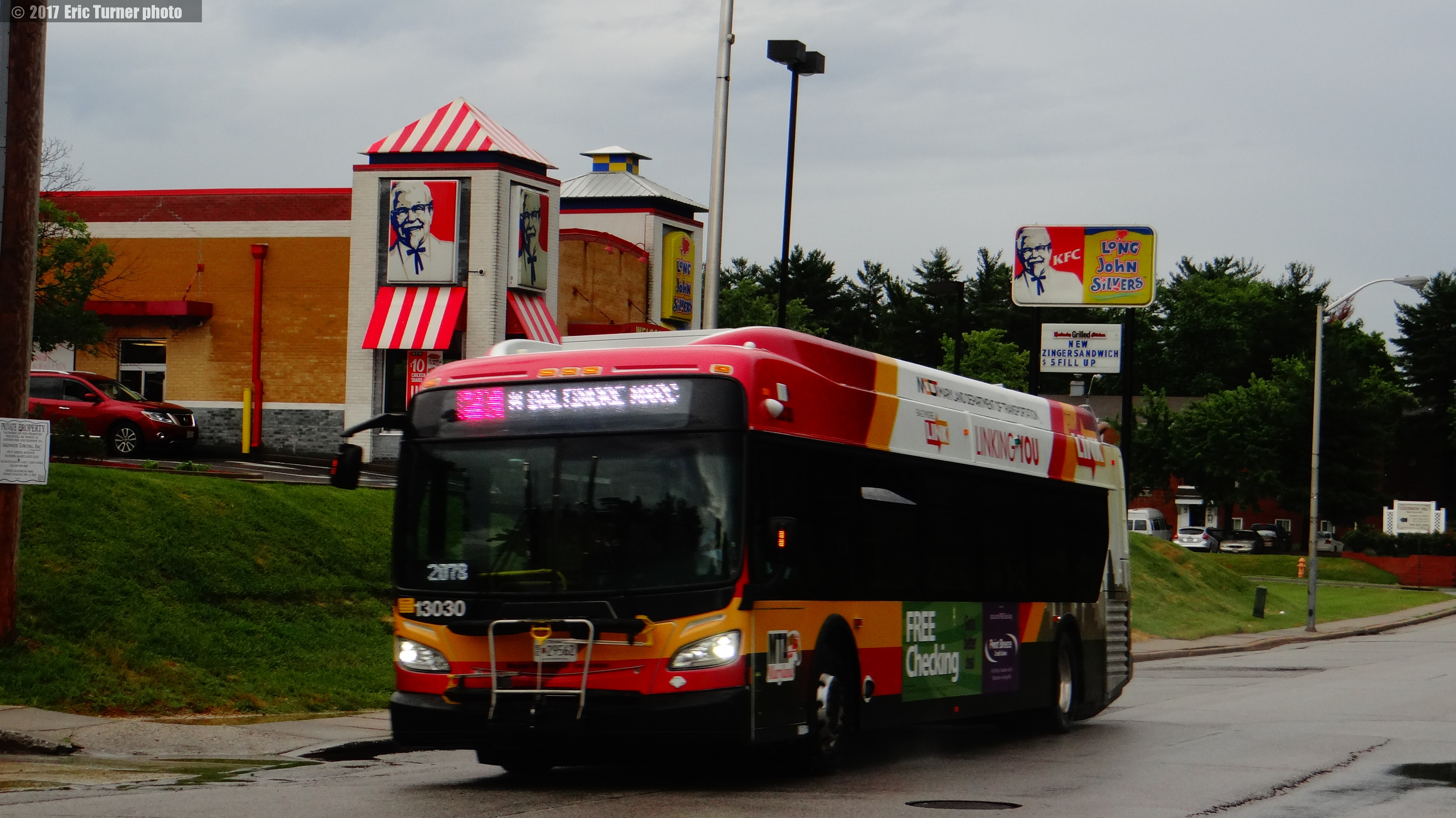

Overview
- System: MTA BaltimoreLink
- Garage: Eastern; Northwest
- Status: active
- Began service: 1948 (Route 5); 2017 (CityLink Pink)
- Ended service: 2017 (Route 5 became CityLink Pink)
- Predecessors: No. 5 Streetcar

Route
- Locale: Baltimore City
- Communities served: Sandtown-Winchester; Upton; Mount Vernon; Moravia; Goodnow Hill
- Other routes: 1, 3, 7, 8, 10, 11, 13, 15, 16, 19, 20, 21, 22, 23, 27, 30, 33, 35, 36, qb40, 44, qb46, qb47, qb48, 50, 51, 52, 53, 54, 61, 64, 91, 97, 120, 150, 160

Service
- Level: Daily
- Frequency: Every 15-20 minutes Every 15 minutes (peak)
- Weekend frequency: Every 15-20 minutes
- Operates: 24 hours

CityLink Pink (abbreviated PK) is a bus route operated by the Maryland Transit Administration in Baltimore. The line currently runs from Cedonia in northeast Baltimore to the West Baltimore MARC station.

The current bus route is the successor to the 5 Druid Hill Avenue, 27 Federal Street, and Preston Street streetcar lines, and the old Route 5.

== History ==
The no. 5 designation has been in use since 1916, either as a streetcar or bus, serving various parts of the Maryland Route 129 corridor along with other parts of the Baltimore area. The route has undergone numerous changes to its structure during this time, with expansions, splits, and cutbacks.

=== As a streetcar ===
Route 5 started operating in 1916 using the Route 5 designation after being split off from the no. 3 streetcar, but its route had been electrified since 1892 using other numerical designations. When the actual no. 5 line route started, it operated from Emory Grove (near Reisterstown), through Pikesville, then down Park Heights Avenue through the Park Heights community and past Pimlico Race Course. Starting in 1924 until the streetcar's demise in 1948, another line identified as no. 33 shared the same track, and operated from Park Heights to Belvedere Avenue to Gwynn Oak.

The line then traveled through Reservoir Hill as it currently does before continuing downtown. Its route downtown was modified frequently during the coming years. The Reservoir Hill section was later eliminated, but it returned in 1996 when Bus Route 28 which then served that area was discontinued. Route 28 had previously operated along the Liberty Road/Liberty Heights Avenue corridor (currently served by Routes 52, 54, and 57), Eutaw Street/Place (currently served by 91), through downtown and along Russell Street and the Cherry Hill community (currently served by Routes 27 and 29).

In 1921, the line was extended to Patterson Park after being combined with other lines.

In 1932, the route of the Route 5 streetcar was shortened to Pikesville, and service between Pikesville and Reisterstown was provided by buses. The first bus line to provide service to Reisterstown was Route M (no relationship to current M-lines along this route), followed by Route 7. Routes 56 and 59 currently operates along Reisterstown Road between Pikesville and Reisterstown.

In 1938, Route 5 was shortened again to Manhattan Avenue (currently near the intersection of Park Heights Avenue and Northern Parkway).

=== As a bus ===
In 1948, the streetcar operation of Route 5 came to an end, and the service was replaced by buses. A new Route 5/7 bus would operate along its route, and would continue to Glyndon. In 1959, the line would be separated into two separate routes, each with these designations. The Route 5 bus would serve the Park Heights Avenue corridor, and Route 7 Reisterstown Road.

In 1973, a new set of branches was added to the line that served the communities of Stevenson, Caves Road, and Greenwood via Villa Julie College.

=== The Baltimore Metro ===
In June 1984, in conjunction with the opening of the first phase of the Baltimore Metro Subway, Route 5 would be shortened to Mondawmin during Metro's hours of operation. A new Route M-3 would operate along Park Heights Avenue to Slade Avenue. Route 5 continued to travel to Slade Avenue during hours when Metro was not operating.

In 1996, Route 5 was modified to operate via Reservoir Hill, a part of its former route, on weekdays and Saturdays, after Route 28, which served this area, was eliminated except on Sundays. On Sundays during this time, Route 5 bypassed Reservoir Hill.

In 2001, when Sunday Metro Connection service was introduced, all Route 5 service to Slade Avenue was discontinued, and Sunday service was routed via Reservoir Hill.

In 2005, as part of the Greater Baltimore Bus Initiative, it was proposed that the Reservoir Hill deviation would be provided by a different line, and all trips would operate via Johns Hopkins Hospital. During the Phase I proposals, a new Route 28 was proposed to serve this area, but this was never implemented. The first Phase II proposal was to provide this service by modifying Route 97, and the second version of this proposal was to maintain Reservoir Hill service as part of Route 5, but as a separate branch that would not serve Mondawmin. No changes were implemented to Route 5 during all of GBBI.

=== BaltimoreLink ===
On June 18, 2017, as part of the BaltimoreLink transit overhaul, Route 5 was divided into a number of routes. CityLink Pink serves the eastern part of Route 5, CityLink Yellow serves the Reservoir Hill section of Route 5, and CityLink Purple serves the western part of Route 5.
