= LocalLink 51 (BaltimoreLink) =

Bus route operated by the Maryland Transit Administration

Route 51

Overview
- System: Maryland Transit Administration
- Garage: Kirk
- Status: active
- Began service: 1959
- Predecessors: No. 11 Streetcar, Route 11

Route
- Locale: Baltimore City; Baltimore County
- Communities served: Rodgers Forge; Homeland; Guilford; Charles Village; Mt. Vernon; Fells Point
- Landmarks served: Towson University; GBMC Hospital; Notre Dame of Maryland University; Loyola College; Evergreen House; Johns Hopkins University; Penn Station; Washington Monument; Baltimore Arena; Convention Center; Harborplace; National Aquarium
- Other routes: 1, 3, 5, 7, 8, 10, 12, 13, 15, 19, 20, 21, 22, 23, 30, 33, 35, 36, qb40, 44, qb46, qb47, qb48, 55, 58, 61, 64, 91, 120, 150, 160

Service
- Level: Daily
- Frequency: Every 30 minutes Every 20 minutes (peak)
- Weekend frequency: Every 30 minutes
- Operates: 5:00 am to 1:00 am

Route 51 is a bus route operated by the Maryland Transit Administration in Baltimore and its suburbs. The line currently runs from the center of Towson to the Inner Harbor in Downtown Baltimore, serving the Charles Street corridor. Route 51 replaced Route 11 on June 18, 2017 due to the BaltimoreLink bus system overhaul.

As part of the Bus Network Improvement Project, the 11 was truncated to run between Towson and the Inner Harbor, with the eastern portion of the route served by the new Route 31, effective 22 February 2015.

Previously, Route 11 started operating between Towson and Canton on February 17, 2008, following modification from its previous route that had been in place for several decades. The line had always served the Charles Street corridor throughout its existence, but its other parts had varied. Numerous branches off of Charles Street and the route operating southwest from downtown Baltimore to Riverview via Washington Boulevard have existed over the years.

The changes that went into effect in 2008 had originally been proposed nearly a decade earlier, but had especially been pushed since 2005. These mostly involved replacing the southern portion of the route with an extension on Route 36.

The routing structure along the Charles Street corridor is the successor to the 11 Bedford Square streetcar and bus Route O. In February 2015 as part of a Bus Network Improvement Project the southeast would be discounted terminating at Light & Lee streets and all Southeast service be transferred to the new 31.

== History ==
Initially, a railroad along Charles Street, known as the "Charles Street Line," began operation in 1862.

The no. 11 streetcar along Charles Street began operation in 1929. The no. 11 designation had previously been used for two jerkwater lines along Roland Avenue and then in Dundalk.

In 1953, the line was extended to Murray Hill when it was combined with Route 56, which had operated since 1948 north of Bedford Square.

In 1959, the line was converted to a bus operation, and it was combined with a pair of routes then identified as Routes 27 and 52 that ran along Washington Boulevard to provide crosstown service.

Over the years, Route 11 has been modified and expanded to serve many areas. These have included:

- Historic Lutherville
- Towson
- Towson University
- Goucher College
- Greater Baltimore Medical Center
- Rodgers Forge
- Ruxton

The line has also seen a lot of cuts in service within Baltimore County, where ridership demand is low. During the 1990s, the following changes were made along the line:

- In 1992, trips to the Lutherville Light Rail Stop were rerouted to Towson via Kenilworth Drive, and trips to Ruxton via Bellona Avenue were reduced. Osler Drive (then called "Towson State") trips were extended to Towson. This was one of the bus route changes that resulted from the opening of the first phase of the Central Light Rail Line.
- In 1996, trips via Osler Drive were discontinued. They were truncated at Rodgers Forge. Low ridership was cited as the reason.
- In 1997, all trips to Towson via Kenilworth were extended to Goucher College. All Saturday service was extended via this route, while intervals between trips were reduced to one hour.
- In 2003, trips to Goucher College were rerouted via Towsontown Boulevard as a result of complaints from residents of Kenilworth Drive. Other trips were routed to Charles Street and the Beltway to serve this area.

== Greater Baltimore Bus Initiative ==
In 2005, as part of the Greater Baltimore Bus Initiative, a comprehensive overhaul plan for the region's transit system, MTA proposed that Route 11 would be modified. The northern portion of the route would continue to operate, but with a routing change in the Towson area in which all trips follows the identical route through Rodgers Forge, and terminate at Greater Baltimore Medical Center. After reaching downtown, buses would operate to Canton rather than Riverview, and service on the current southern end would be replaced by extending Route 36. This would provide direct service between Charles Village, Penn Station, and Canton.

This plan was delayed, and in 2006, a revised version was announced in which the northern end would be at the Towson Courthouse rather than GBMC, and a new peak hour branch would be formed to Roland Park to replace Route 61, which was proposed for elimination.

This plan was delayed several times due to various issues. It was finally implemented on February 17, 2008, but Route 61 continues to operate peak hour service to Roland Park.

== BaltimoreLink ==
With the BaltimoreLink transit system coming into operation on June 18, 2017, Route 11 will be replaced in its entirety by LocalLink 51.
