= LocalLink 21 (BaltimoreLink) =

Bus route in Baltimore, Maryland, US

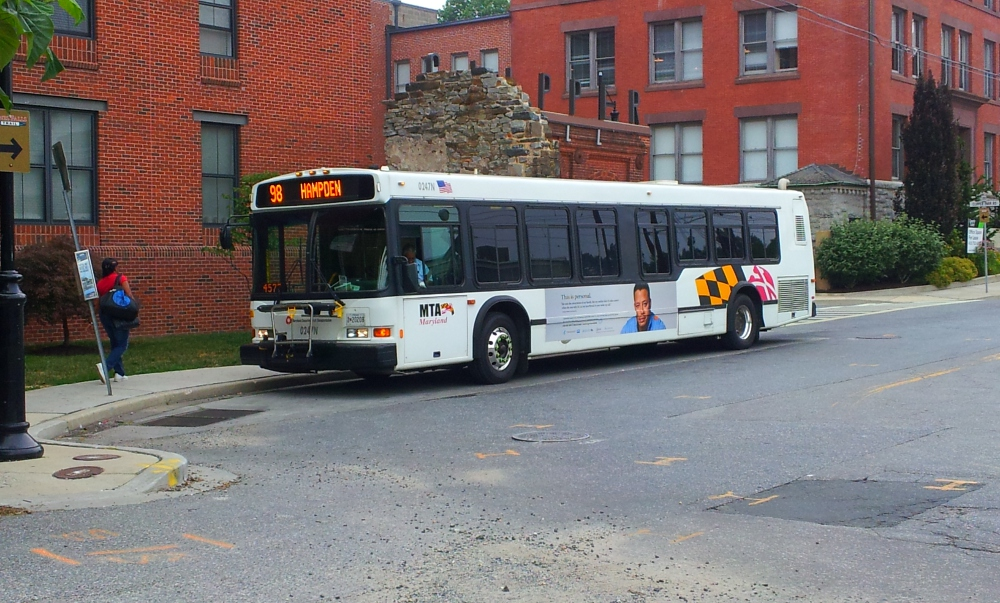

Overview
- System: Maryland Transit Administration
- Garage: Northwest
- Status: active
- Began service: 2000

Route
- Locale: Baltimore City
- Communities served: Hampden
- Landmarks served: The Rotunda
- Other routes: 22, 27

Service
- Level: Daily
- Frequency: Every 40 minutes Every 40 minutes (peak)
- Weekend frequency: Every 40 minutes
- Operates: 4:00 am to 2:00 am

LocalLink 21, formerly known as Hampden Shuttle Bug or Hampden Shuttle, was the first neighborhood shuttle to be introduced. It started operating in 2000 as an experiment conducted by MTA to provide a new type of service. At that time, service operated every 17 minutes in order to match light rail frequencies. But in 2003, it was reduced to one bus every 34 minutes.

The line operates on portions of the route also covered by routes 22 and 27, but connects to various points of interest in the Hampden area, and to the Woodberry Light Rail Stop.

In 2005, as part of the Greater Baltimore Bus Initiative, a comprehensive overhaul plan for the region's transit system, it was initially proposed that the Hampden Shuttle would be completely eliminated due to low ridership and a heavy cost to taxpayers. This was a plan that seriously worried the area's residents. However, after community meetings, it was ultimately decided that it would continue operating with no schedule change.

In 2006, MTA proposed that the routing would shift from Falls Road to Roland Avenue in order to replace service that would be discontinued on a portion of Route 27. This plan was introduced again late in 2007, and implemented early in 2008.

In 2017, as a part of the BaltimoreLink system redesign, Route 98 became LocalLink 21, sharing much of the same route.
