= MTA BaltimoreLink =

Bus transit service in Maryland

MTA Maryland Bus
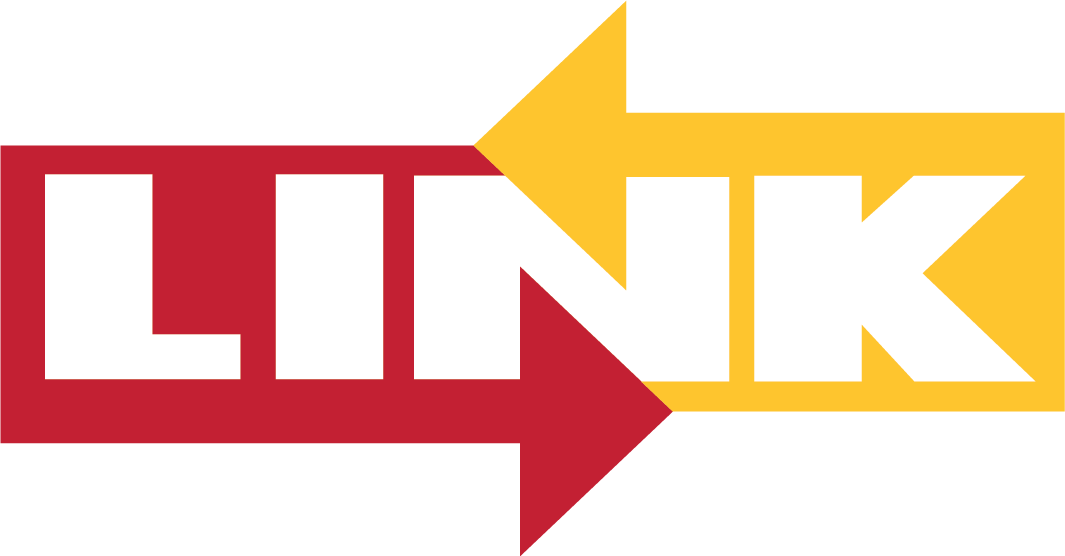

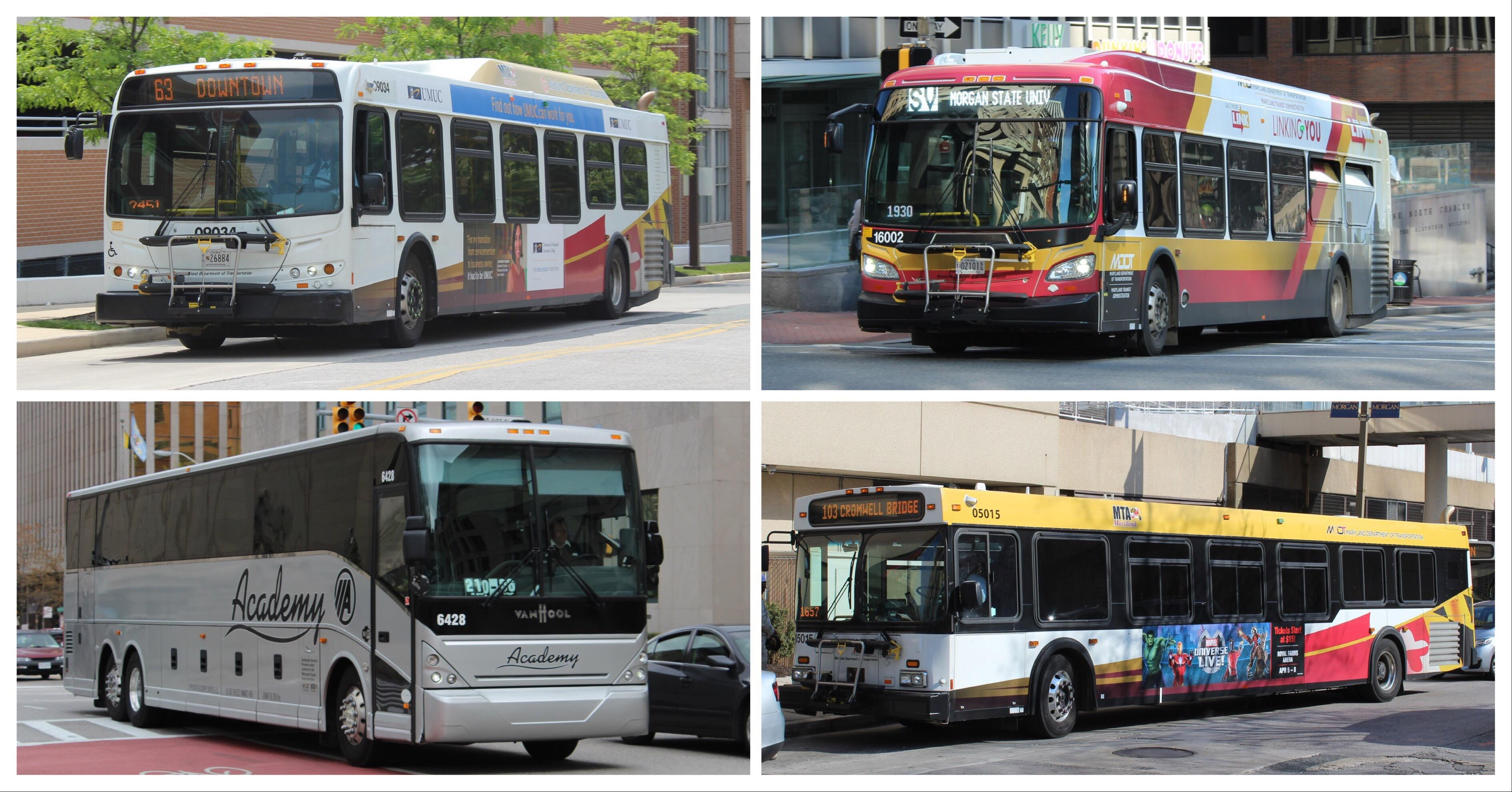
- (top left) LocalLink; (top right) CityLink; (bottom left) Commuter; (bottom right) Express BusLink
- Parent: Maryland Transit Administration
- Founded: April 30, 1970 (53 years ago)
- Headquarters: 6 St. Paul Street Baltimore, Maryland
- Locale: Baltimore–Washington metropolitan area
- Service area: Baltimore-Washington Metropolitan Area
- Service type: LocalLink, CityLink, Express BusLink, Light RailLink, Metro SubwayLink, Commuter BusLink
- Routes: LocalLink: 45; CityLink: 12; Express: 8 Commuter: 19; ICC: 4
- Hubs: 70+ (Baltimore area)
- Fleet: Urban buses: 816; Motor coaches: 18
- Daily ridership: 272,700 (Q2 2016)
- Annual ridership: 81,029,100 (2015)
- Fuel type: Diesel, diesel-electric hybrid
- Operator: MDOT
- Chief executive: Holly Arnold
- Website: www.mta.maryland.gov

The Maryland Transit Administration provides primary public bus service for the Baltimore metropolitan area and commuter bus service in other parts of Maryland. There are 76 bus routes which include 45 LocalLink routes, 12 high-frequency CityLink routes, eight express bus routes (which operate from the suburbs to downtown Baltimore), 19 commuter bus routes, and five Intercounty Connector (ICC) routes which operate primarily from central Maryland to Washington, D.C. or Washington Metrorail stations. Local and commuter bus routes operate in conjunction with one subway line, three light rail lines and MARC Train service, and connect to other transit agencies.

== Operation ==
MTA bus service operates throughout the Baltimore-Washington Metropolitan Area and other parts of the state, including 12 CityLink high-frequency color routes; LocalLink routes 21 through 95; Express BusLink routes 103, 105, 115, 120, 150, 154, 160, and 163; Intercounty Connector routes 201 through 205, and commuter bus routes 310 through 995.

=== Local buses ===
In June 2017, Maryland governor Larry Hogan launched BaltimoreLink as part of an initiative for a better transit system in Baltimore. Local bus lines are identified with a one- or two-digit number. Many numerical designations date back to Baltimore streetcars, and use the route numbers of the streetcars which had operated on the same streets.

Most local buses operate regular service seven days a week throughout most hours of the day and evening; some routes operate 24 hours. A small number of routes do not have evening service, operate on weekdays or during peak hours only, or at times needed by certain employers.

Until 2009, routes operated in the northwest part of the city and suburbs were known as Metro connection buses. The routes were designated with the letter M followed by a number, and operated from a Metro station to a specified location or between two Metro stations. When Metro connection bus service began in 1984, it used designations beginning with the letter M (Mondawmin), R (Rogers Avenue) or P (Plaza), followed by a number. After the Metro was extended to Owings Mills in 1987, the letter M was used for "Metro."

The number of M lines had declined since 1988; many were consolidated, and some were eliminated. After the first phase of the Greater Baltimore Bus Initiative took effect in 2005, only seven M lines remained; the number increased to eight after the M-6 route was restored several months later.

In 2008 and 2009, all M lines were renamed with two-digit numerical designations from 52 to 54 and 56 to 60. Route changes were also made, including merges, splits and the elimination of part of Route M-17.

=== Express, commuter, and Intercounty Connector buses ===
MTA express routes are distinct from "express" trips assigned to several local bus routes. Express routes provide rapid service by limiting the number of stops along a route. The number of express routes has declined due to the construction of new rapid-transit services and the elimination or consolidation of under-performing routes.

Unlike commuter buses, express bus routes serve areas where local buses are available. Comparable, albeit slower, trips can also be made with local buses. Commuter routes provide service between locations not connected by local bus routes.

Both express and commuter routes, identified with 3-digit numbers, offer service primarily during weekday rush hours between downtown areas and Park-and-Ride lots or other suburban locations in Maryland. The commuter routes, designated with higher numbers, are operated by contractors rather than MTA employees.

The newest addition to commuter bus service since 2010, known as the Intercounty Connector (ICC), operates from Gaithersburg to BWI Marshall Airport, University of Maryland College Park and Fort Meade on the new Intercounty Connector expressway in central Maryland.

=== Neighborhood Shuttle Bug ===
Two local MTA routes were neighborhood shuttles, also known as Shuttle Bugs. These local routes operated in specific neighborhoods to transport people within the communities.

During the early 2000s, MTA introduced the routes. Differences from the other routes included:

- Reduced fare for a single ride: $1, rather than the $1.60 charged on other buses. MTA unlimited-ride passes (also known as GO-passes) can be used.
- Three distinctively-painted, 30-foot Opus buses were purchased in 2006 for the Mondawmin shuttle.
- Bus-stop signs have unique identifications, different from regular bus-stop signs. The Hampden Shuttle is identified by a ladybug, and the Mondawmin Shuttle uses a grasshopper.

The Hampden Shuttle Bug was the first of seven shuttle routes originally planned for Baltimore and its suburbs. Only the Hampden and Mondawmin routes were implemented, and no timetable was developed for the other neighborhood shuttle routes.

A proposed Shuttle Bug route between Randallstown and the Owings Mills Metro Subway Station was opposed by residents along its route. Objections included noise concerns.

In 2005 and 2006, as part of the Greater Baltimore Bus Initiative, MTA proposed changes to these routes which included eliminating Route 98 and reducing service on Route 97 to once an hour. Route 98 was shifted in 2008 to replace service on Roland Avenue which was lost in a change to Route 27.

Shuttle-bug service was discontinued as part of BaltimoreLink in 2017, and Route 97 was replaced by LocalLink 82. Most of Route 98 was replaced by LocalLink 21.

=== QuickBus ===
In 2005, the MTA introduced a form of express transit known as rapid bus service; the first route was Route 40. The line operates every 10 to 15 minutes from the western to the eastern suburbs of Baltimore through the downtown area, serving various communities in West and East Baltimore. Stops are limited to major intersections, transfer points, and points of interest. Local fares are charged on Route 40, which was later named QuickBus.

In 2009, a new QuickBus route was introduced. Designated as QuickBus 48, it operates on the same route as Route 8 except for the section north of Towson Town Center. A proposed QuickBus route along Route 3, with the designation Route 43, was delayed.

Two more QuickBus routes operated from August 30, 2010, to June 17, 2017. QuickBus 46 operated alongside routes 5 and 10 from the Paradise Avenue loop to Cedonia Loop. QuickBus 47 traveled along route 15 from Walbrook Junction to Overlea Loop. Both buses operated on weekdays at peak hours only.

In 2022, MTA Maryland proposed a plan to reintroduce QuickBus-like service as QuickLink as part of the fall 2022 service changes. The proposal would include a pilot QuickLink 40 east–west limited-stop bus route. QuickLink 40 would operate every 20 minutes during peak hours and every 30 minutes during midday from North Bend to the Essex Park and Ride. The pilot service was placed on hold as MDOT MTA focuses on improving system-wide reliability, but may be included in future service changes.

== Fares ==
See: Current MTA Fares

== Fleet ==
Image	Builder	Model	Length (ft/m)	Year	Fuel Propulsion	Powertrain (Engine/Transmission)	Fleet numbers (Total)	Paint scheme	Notes
A white, red and yellow bus	New Flyer	XDE40	40 ft (12 m)	2012	Hybrid	Cummins ISL9; Allison H 40 EP	12001-12053 (53)	CityLink & LocalLink	12014 retired on December 7, 2022; 12027 sent to Frederick TransIT; Currently Being Retired. (1/53) Buses are active.; Scheduled to be replaced by the 2025-2026 New Flyer orders.
An articulated bus at night	New Flyer	XDE60	60 ft (18 m)	2013	Hybrid	Cummins ISL9; Allison H 50 EP	12081-12090 (10)	CityLink	12081-12082, and 12085-12090 are retired.; Currently Being Retired. (2/10) Buses are active.; Scheduled to be replaced by the 2026 New Flyer XE60 CHARGE articulated buses.
A red, white and yellow bus	New Flyer	XDE40	40 ft (12 m)	2013	Hybrid	Cummins ISL9; Allison H 40 EP	13001-13040 (40)	CityLink & LocalLink	13007, 13008, 13018, 13020, 13025, 13026, and 13040 are retired.
A bus at a stop	New Flyer	XDE40	40 ft (12 m)	2013	Hybrid	Cummins ISB6.7; BAE System 200 HybriDrive	13041-13050 (10)	CityLink & LocalLink	13041-13050 are retired, and Currently Being Stored.
A parked bus, with the door open	New Flyer	XDE40	40 ft (12 m)	2014	Hybrid	Cummins ISL9; Allison H 40 EP	14001-14041 (41)	LocalLink CityLink & LocalLink	
A bus at a stop, seen from the front	New Flyer	XD40	40 ft (12 m)	2016	Diesel	Cummins L9; Allison B3400xFE	16001-16099 (99)	LocalLink CityLink	16054 retired on November 1, 2023.; 16014 retired on September 4, 2026 after a tree fell ontop of it while on the 87
A bus on a city street	New Flyer	XD40	40 ft (12 m)	2017	Diesel	Cummins L9; Allison B3400xFE	17000-17072 (73)	LocalLink	17000 was originally numbered "16100"; units 17000–17028 are 2016 models.; 17056 retired on March 15, 2022.; 17039 retired on July 8, 2026 after being involved in a mass casualty incident with it crashing into a building in Pikesville while on the 89
Two stopped buses, seen from the front	New Flyer	XD40	40 ft (12 m)	2018	Diesel	Cummins L9; Allison B3400xFE	18001-18070 (70)	LocalLink	
A white bus, seen from the front	New Flyer	XD40	40 ft (12 m)	2019	Diesel	Cummins L9; Allison B3400xFE	19001- 19070 (70)	LocalLink	
A bus at an intersection	NovaBus	LFS	40 ft (12 m)	2020	Diesel	Cummins L9; Allison B3400xFE	20001-20030 (30)	LocalLink	20001 arrived in 2019.
An articulated bus	NovaBus	LFS-A	60 ft (18 m)	2020	Diesel	Cummins L9; Allison B3400xFE	20031- 20070 (40)	LocalLink	20031 arrived in 2019.
A bus with a blue bicycle in front	NovaBus	LFS	40 ft (12 m)	2021	Diesel	Cummins L9; Allison B3400xFE	21001- 21070 (70)	LocalLink	
A white, red and orange bus	NovaBus	LFS	40 ft (12m)	2022	Diesel	Cummins L9; Allison B3400xFE	22001-22070 (70)	LocalLink	Arrived September 2022.
A bus at a stop	NovaBus	LFS	40 ft (12m)	2023	Diesel	Cummins L9; Allison B3400xFE	23001-23070 (70)	LocalLink	23010 & 23012 has been retrofitted with new TV screens.
MTA 2023 XE40 #23091 with the Earth Day Youth Art competition wrap	New Flyer	XE40	40 ft (12m)	2023	Electric	Siemens ELFA3; ZF AVE130 (Motor)	23091-23094 (4)	Electric Wave Livery	Arrived in 2023, entered service late January 2024. 23091 and 23094 has Earth Day Youth Art Competition wrap.
A blue articulated bus	New Flyer	XE60	60 ft (18m)	2023	Electric	Siemens ELFA3; ZF AVE130 (Motor)	23095-23097 (3)	Electric Wave Livery	Arrived in 2023, entered service late January 2024.
	NovaBus	LFS	40 ft (12m)	2024	Diesel	Cummins L9; Allison B3400xFE	24001-24070 (70)	LocalLink	One of the last orders from Nova Bus, as it is ceasing its U.S. Plant.
On the CityLink Lime Line	New Flyer	XDE40	40 ft (12m)	2025	Hybrid	Cummins B6.7; Allison eGen Flex H 40 hybrid system	25001-25050 (50)	LocalLink	25001 Entered Service on 12/03/25. Order for 50 Xcelsior Hybrid Buses.
	New Flyer	XE40	40 ft (12m)	2025	Electric	Siemens ELFA3; ZF AVE130 (Motor)	25079-25098 (20)	LocalLink	25079 Entered Service on 10/28/25. Order for 20 Xcelsior Electric Charge Buses.
26001 on the yellow	New Flyer	XDE40	40ft (12m)	2026	Hybrid	Cummins B6.7; Allison eGen Flex H 40 hybrid system	26001-26037 (37)	LocalLink	26001 is in service
26064 heading to falls road LR	GILLIG	Low Floor HEV	40ft (12m)	2026	Hybrid	Cummins B6.7; Allison eGen Flex H 40 hybrid system	26050-26069 (20)	LocalLink	Order for 20 Hybrid buses. First ever contract to GILLIG by MDOT MTA.
	New Flyer	XE60	60ft (18m)	2026	Electric	Siemens ELFA3; ZF AV130 (motor)	26071-26080 (10)	LocalLink	Order for 10 Xcelsior CHARGE articulated buses

== Bus yards ==
MTA local bus service in Baltimore is divided into four divisions, each served by a maintenance yard. The first digit of a bus's block number, attached to the bottom right corner of its windshield (from inside of bus), indicates its base division. The buses also have a small letter suffix on the fleet series number. The letter represents the first letter of the division's name, where the bus is based. The Eastern Bus Division will be closed in 2026 for rebuilding, with bus chargers (similar to the rebuilt Kirk Avenue Division, which reopened in June 2021) and new employee and training rooms. The garage will have a temporary lot, and will be finished around 2030. Other garages will be similar, as the MTA is planning to transition to electric vehicles.

Base (No.)	Base (Letter)	Division	Routes	Yard location
1	B	Bush Street	OR, BL, SV, YW, PR, BR, 26, 29, 32, 37,38, 40, 56, 67, 69, 70, 71, 73, 75, 76, 77, 78, 91, 94, 95, 103, 115, 150,	1515 Washington Boulevard
2	E	Eastern	NV, PK, OR, BL, 21, 22, 36, 40, 56, 59, 62, 63, 65, 105, 120, 160, 163	201 South Oldham Street
3	K	Kirk Avenue	GR, PK, RD, SV, 21, 28, 30, 33, 51, 52, 53, 54, 57, 93, 103, 105, 154	2226 Kirk Avenue
4	N	Northwest	LM, NV, GD, 22, 28, 29, 30, 31, 34, 37, 79, 80, 81, 82, 83, 85, 87, 89, 91, 92, 94	4401 Mount Hope Drive
