= Downtown Baltimore =

Downtown Baltimore City Centre
- Central Business District and residential area
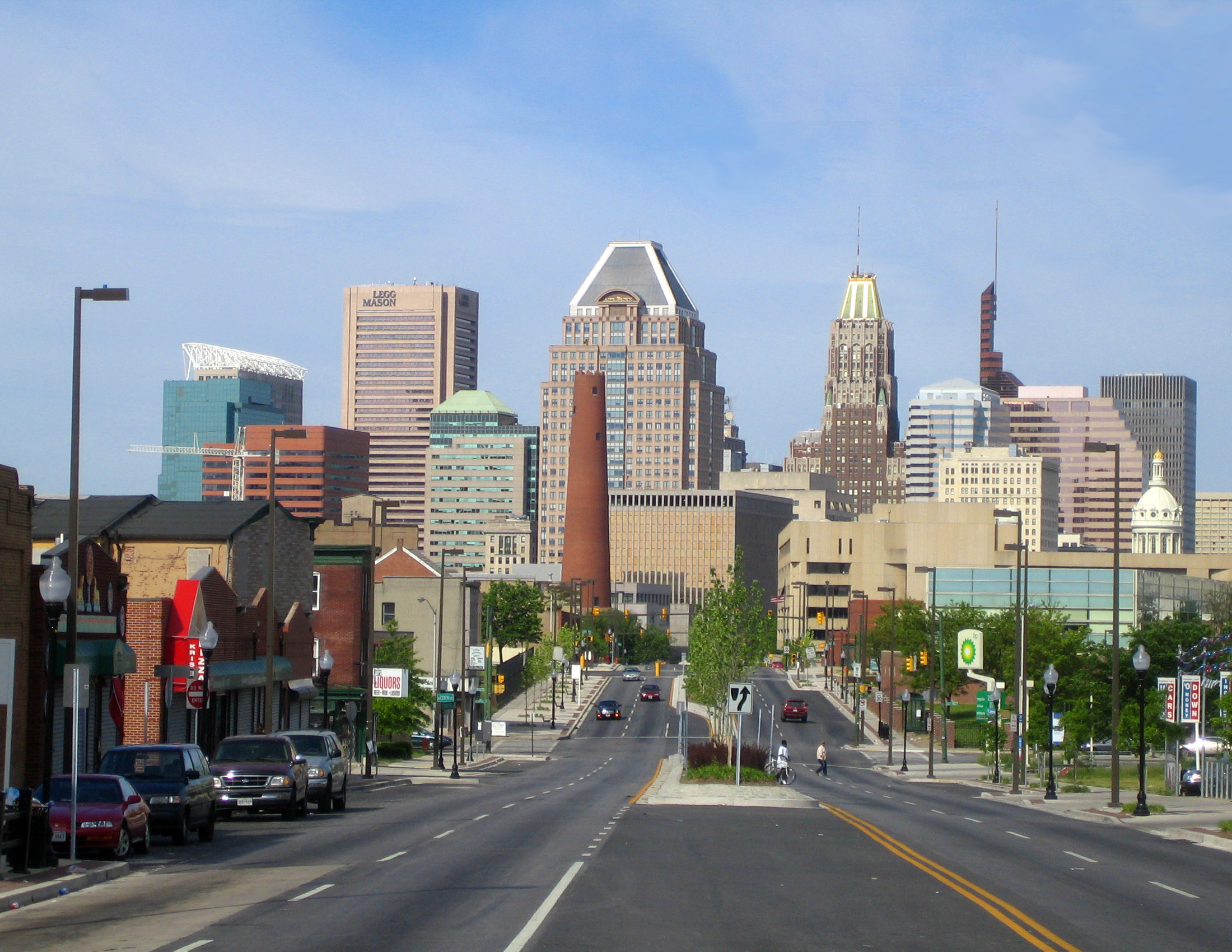
- Downtown Baltimore as seen from East Fayette Street

- Location within Baltimore
- Coordinates: 39°17′22″N 76°37′00″W
- Country: United States
- State: Maryland
- City: Baltimore

Population
  - Total: 41,561

Downtown Baltimore is the central business district of the city of Baltimore traditionally bounded by Martin Luther King, Jr. Boulevard to the west, Franklin Street to the north, President Street to the east and the Inner Harbor area to the south.

In 1904, downtown Baltimore was almost destroyed by a huge fire with damages estimated at $150 million. Since the City of Baltimore was chartered in 1796, this downtown nucleus has been the focal point of business in the Baltimore metropolitan area. It has also increasingly become a heavily populated neighborhood with over 37,000 residents and new condominiums and apartment homes being built steadily.

== Geography ==
City Center is the historic financial district in Baltimore that has increasingly shifted eastward and into the Inner Harbor. Hundreds of businesses are found here, and it remains the center of life in Baltimore. The area is home to the majority of Baltimore's skyscrapers including the Bank of America building, the M&T Bank Building, the Transamerica Tower, the Baltimore World Trade Center, the old IBM building, and the massive Charles Center district. It includes historic Charles Street as well as significant avenues of commercial and cultural activity along Pratt Street, east to west, and St. Paul Street-Calvert Street, north to south.

The Inner Harbor is the chief commercial and tourist destination in Baltimore. The Inner Harbor features a large number of restaurants, hotels, retail areas (such as Harborplace), and entertainment (such as Power Plant Live!). It was named by National Geographic as one of the best summer trips in 2012 (along with all of Baltimore in general). The Inner Harbor is also home to a variety of museums and scientific institutions such as the Maryland Science Center, the National Aquarium in Baltimore, the Reginald F. Lewis Museum of Maryland African American History & Culture, the Flag House & Star-Spangled Banner Museum, Port Discovery children's museum, and Living Classroom environmental education centers. Like much of Baltimore, the area features historic, often industrial, buildings from the eighteenth and nineteenth centuries that have been repurposed for modern industry and residences, including the Pratt Street Power Plant which was built in 1900 and now hosts a Barnes & Noble bookstore, the Baltimore Hard Rock Cafe, and other retail tenants.

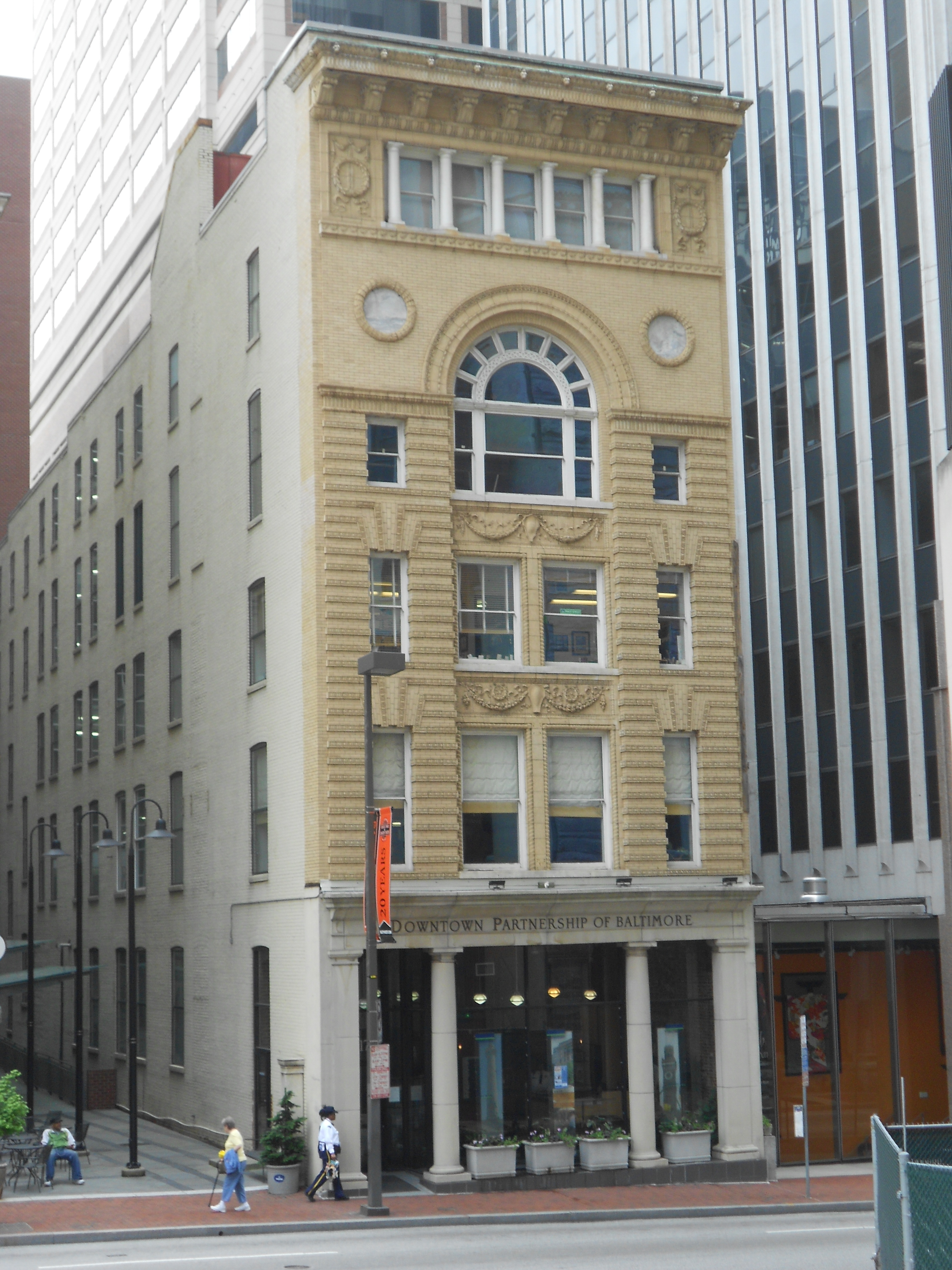
Charles Street headquarters of the Partnership for Downtown Baltimore

Westside Baltimore is the western portion of downtown Baltimore that includes Market Center and many of the newest developments in downtown Baltimore, including the Baltimore Convention Center. It is also home to the site of the "Superblock" project that will include hundreds of condos and apartments as well as a variety of retail and commercial space. The former home of Baltimore's many and famed department stores, Westside Baltimore is now anchored by the University of Maryland, Baltimore consisting of the University of Maryland Health System, University of Maryland School of Law and the University of Maryland Biopark. The Westside is also home to several performing arts centers, including the Hippodrome Theatre, CFG Bank Arena, and the Everyman Theatre. G. Krug & Son Ironworks and Museum, in its original location, is the oldest continually operating blacksmith shop in the United States as well as a museum.

The former home of famed American writer Edgar Allan Poe is located at the Edgar Allan Poe House and Museum, a few blocks northwest from his grave at the intersection of Greene and Fayette streets. Nearby is the historic Lexington Market, one of the longest-running markets in the world, having been founded in 1782 and in continual operation since, selling a variety of prepared foods and groceries.

Mount Vernon, also known as the cultural district, is a high-density area just north of Downtown known for its attractive nightlife, buoyed by its large number of bars, clubs and lounges and its historic multi-story townhomes (most of which have been transformed into apartments) and traditional apartment buildings. Mount Vernon features the Joseph Meyerhoff Symphony Hall, home of the Baltimore Symphony Orchestra, as well as the Lyric Opera House. The world-renowned Peabody Institute is also located in Mount Vernon adjacent to the Walters Art Museum. To the very north is Penn Station, which offers Amtrak service to several U.S. major cities as well as MARC service to Washington, D.C. A major north–south avenue in Mount Vernon is Cathedral Street, named for the National Shrine of the Assumption, the first Catholic cathedral built in the United States, which is also considered the masterpiece of Benjamin Henry Latrobe, the "father of American architecture" and famed creator of the U.S. Capitol.

Downtown Baltimore also contains Camden Yards, which includes Oriole Park at Camden Yards, the home field of the Baltimore Orioles of Major League Baseball, and M&T Bank Stadium, home of the Baltimore Ravens of the National Football League. Nearby are the Sports Legends Museum at Camden Yards, the now-closed Geppi's Entertainment Museum, and the Babe Ruth Birthplace and Museum.

== Transportation ==
Downtown Baltimore offers many options for transportation, including subway, light rail, bus service, Amtrak, MARC Train service through Penn Station and Camden Station as well as access to I-83, I-695, I-95, 295, and 395.
