= Baltimore Bike Share =

Bicycle sharing system

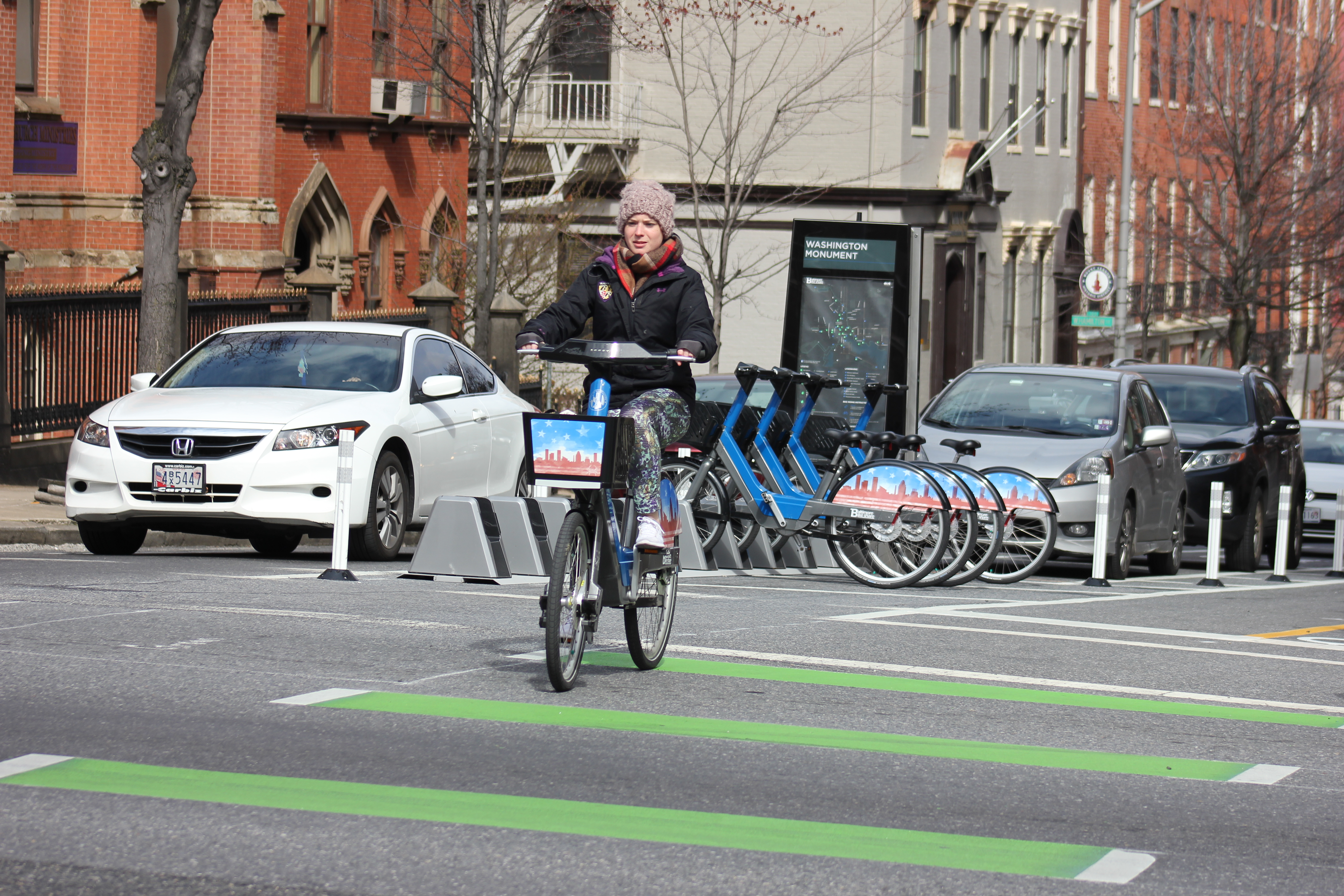

Overview
- Owner: City of Baltimore
- Area served: Baltimore, Maryland, United States
- Locale: Baltimore metropolitan area
- Transit type: Bicycle-sharing system
- Number of stations: 50+
- Daily ridership: 6,000
- Annual ridership: 58,400 (160/day)
- Website: bmorebikeshare.com

Operation
- Began operation: 2016; 10 years ago
- Ended operation: August 15, 2018; 8 years ago
- Operators: Bewegen Technologies; Corps Logistics
- Number of vehicles: 175 (500 planned)

Baltimore Bike Share (also referred to as Bmore Bikeshare) was a bicycle-sharing system that served the city of Baltimore, Maryland. The system had more than 50 stations, all owned by the Baltimore City government, and operated in a public–private partnership with Bewegen Technologies and Corps Logistics. Launched in 2016, Baltimore Bike Share had the largest electrical-assisted cycling (Pedelec) fleet in North America.

On August 15, 2018, the Baltimore Bike Share system was cancelled at a cost of $3.2 million and shut down immediately due to on-going problems with the system. Replacing the Baltimore Bike Share are dockless scooters and bicycles from startup companies Bird and Lime.

== Pricing ==
Baltimore Bike Share offered four pricing options: Founding Member ($100.00/year), Monthly Pass ($15.00/month), Go Pass ($2.00/trip), and Single-Trip. The first 45 minutes of each ride are included for Go Trip and Single-Trip Passholders. Rides that are longer than 45 minutes are subject to extended use charges ($2 per 30 minutes).

== Stations ==
The network included 50 stations in Baltimore City: 22 fixed stations and 28 planned or temporary stations. Many of these stations were located along bicycle boulevards around the city. Several stations also linked to the transit lines of the Metro Subway and Light Rail, as well as regional rail lines operated by the MARC Train and Amtrak.

Number	Station Name	Address	MTA Connections	Points of Interest
1	McHenry Row	1603 Whetstone Way	1	McHenry Row, Fort McHenry
2	Cross Street Market	1065 S Charles St.	1, 64	Cross Street Market, Federal Hill
3	Can Company	2400 Boston St.	13, 31	Can Company Shopping Center
4	Brown Advisory at Bond St Wharf	901 S Bond St.	Green Circulator; Maritime Park Water Taxi Stop	Fells Point
5	Baltimore Visitor Center	401 Light St.	Purple Circulator	Harborplace, Maryland Science Center
6	Harbor East	675 S President St.	Harbor East Water Taxi Stop | Harbor East	
7	Shot Tower Metro	1 S Front St.	Shot Tower–Market Place Metro Subway Station; Green Circulator	Phoenix Shot Tower, Port Discovery
8	National Aquarium	501 E Pratt St.	Orange Circulator	National Aquarium
9	City Hall	100 Holliday St.	5, 20, 23, 26, 91, 105, 160	Baltimore City Hall, Government Center
10	Charles Center Metro	110 E Baltimore St.	Charles Center Metro Subway Station	Charles Center
11	Pratt & Light	100 Light St.	Purple Circulator	Harborplace, McKeldin Square, The Gallery
12	2Hopkins Apartments	2 Hopkins Pl.	University Center / Baltimore Street Light Rail Station	Royal Farms Arena
13	Pratt & Howard	250 W Pratt St.	Convention Center Light Rail Station	Baltimore Convention Center
14	University of Maryland	601 W Baltimore St.	University of Maryland Transit Center	University of Maryland, Baltimore, University of Maryland Medical Center
15	Washington & MLK	700 Washington Blvd.	36	Pigtown
16	Hollins Market	26 S Arlington Ave		Hollins Market
17	University of Maryland BioPark	801 W Baltimore St.	Orange Circulator	University of Maryland BioPark
18	Lexington Market	312 W Lexington St.	Lexington Market Metro Subway Station; Lexington Market Light Rail Station	Lexington Market
19	Hotel Indigo*	24 W Franklin St.		
20	Cathedral & Eager	917 Cathedral St.	3, 11	Mount Vernon
21	Penn Station	1525 N Charles St.	Penn Station	Station North
22	Camden Yards	301 W Camden St.	Camden Station	Oriole Park at Camden Yards
23	Mount Vernon Marketplace	520 Park Ave	Mt. Vernon Light RailLink station	Mount Vernon Marketplace, Maryland Historical Society
24	Constellation at Harbor Point	1000 Wills St.	Maritime Park Water Taxi	Harbor Point
25	BGE at Center Plaza	110 W Fayette St.	Charles Center Metro SubwayLink station	
26	Broadway & Fleet	1640 Aliceanna St.		Broadway Market, Fells Point
27	Fawn & Albemarle	248 Albemarle St.	23, 26	Little Italy
28	Union Square	16 S Stricker St.	10, 35	Union Square
29	Eastern & Linwood	Eastern Ave./Linwood Ave.	15	Patterson Park
30	Johns Hopkins University	3330 St Paul St.	11	Johns Hopkins University, Charles Village
31	Saint Paul & Madison	800 St. Paul St.		
32	Johns Hopkins Hospital	624 N Broadway	Johns Hopkins Hospital Metro Subway Station	Johns Hopkins Hospital
33	State Center Metro	300 W Preston St.	State Center Metro Subway Station	State Center Complex
34	Cultural Center Light Rail	992 Park Ave.	Cultural Center Light Rail Station	Meyerhoff Symphony Hall
35	Mount Royal Light Rail	1201 W Mt Royal Ave.	Mt. Royal/MICA station	University of Baltimore, Lyric Opera House
36	Betty Hyatt Community Park	1724 E Baltimore St.		
37	Druid Hill Park	3001 East Dr.		Druid Hill Park, Maryland Zoo
38	Patterson Park	27 S Patterson Park Ave		Patterson Park
39	North & Maryland	30 W North Ave	11, 13	Station North, Parkway Theatre
40	Franklin Square	1301 W Lexington St.	1	Franklin Square
41	Carroll Park	1000 Bayard St.	36	Carroll Park
42	Gough & Wolf	S Wolf St.		Butchers Hill
43	Charles & Fort	E Fort Ave./Charles St.	South Baltimore	
44	Webster & Fort	644 E Fort Ave.		
45	Maryland & Biddle	Maryland Ave./Biddle St.		
46	Saint Paul & Chase	Calvert St./Biddle St.		
47	MICA	1515 W Mt Royal Ave	North Avenue Light Rail Station	Maryland Institute College of Art
48	Perkins Homes	1411 Gough St.		
49	Read & Calvert	818 N. Calvert St.	Purple Circulator	
50	Ostend & Light	1251 Light St.	Purple Circulator	

Key	Meaning
Hollins Market	Fixed Station
Charles & Eager	Planned Station
Hotel Indigo*	Temporary Station

== See also ==
- Capital Bikeshare, bicycle sharing system for Washington, D.C.
- Indego, bicycle sharing system for Philadelphia
