= Baltimore Water Taxi =

Water taxi service in Baltimore, Maryland, United States

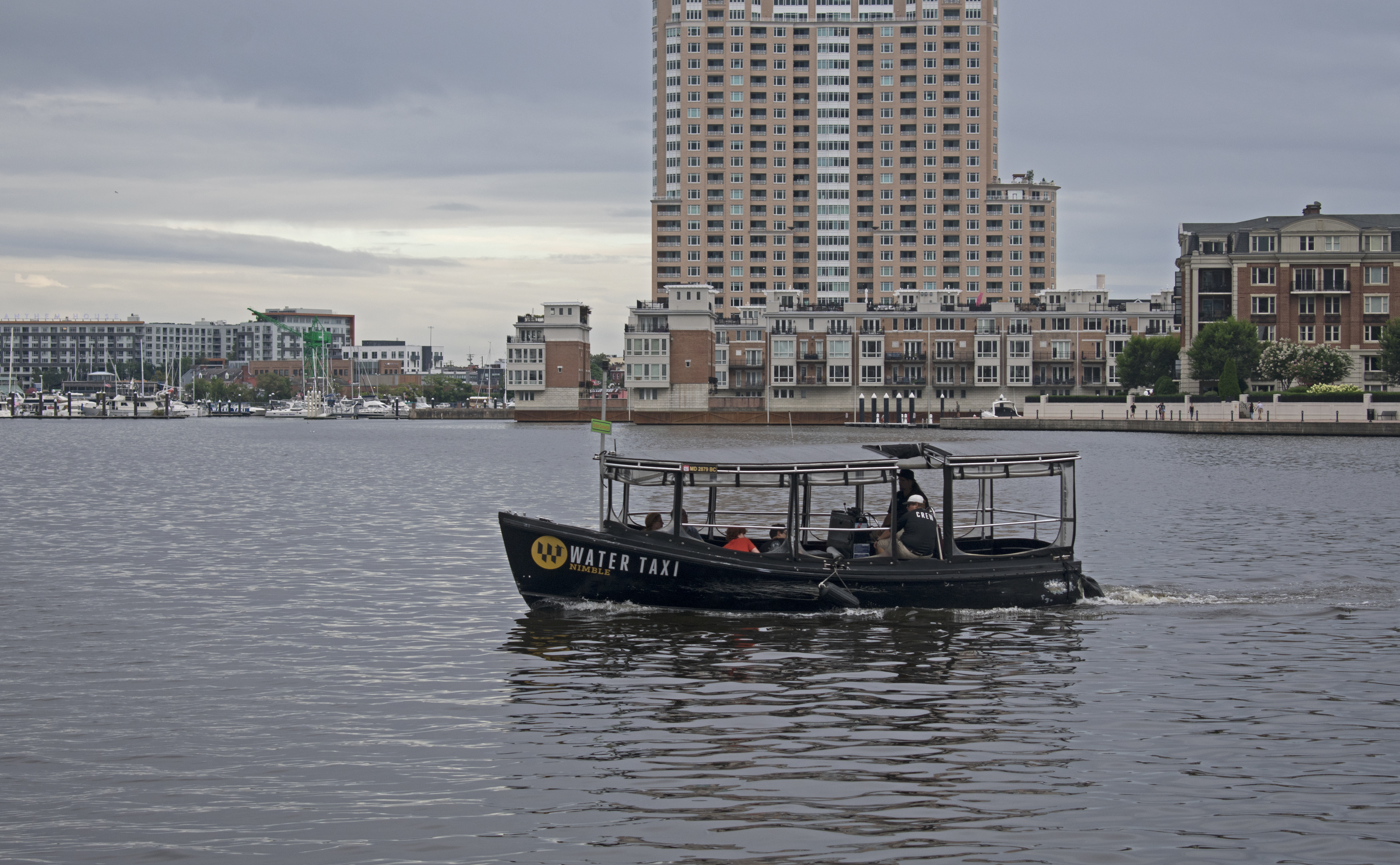
- Baltimore Water Taxi seen from Seven Foot Knoll Light
- Locale: Baltimore Inner Harbor
- Waterway: Baltimore Inner Harbor
- Transit type: Water taxi
- Owner: Kevin Plank
- Operator: Harbor Boating, Inc
- Began operation: 4 July 1975 (51 years ago)
- No. of lines: 5
- No. of vessels: 13
- No. of terminals: 17
- Daily ridership: 16,000,000 over 25 years
- Website: http://www.thewatertaxi.com/ Baltimore Water Taxi

Baltimore Water Taxi is a water taxi service offering sightseeing and transportation service mainly to points along the Baltimore Inner Harbor.

== History ==
The Baltimore Water Taxi (BWT) was founded by Edward M. Kane (1931–2003), and for many years known as Ed Kane's Water Taxi. In 2010 it was sold and renamed.

While tourism is the traditional use of these taxis, there are increasing efforts to use them as commuter transportation. Here one of the barriers is getting from the dock to the office, and Ed Kane's was one of the first to offer extra ground transportation for this purpose. The city of Baltimore is encouraging this by subsidizing some new routes, some operated by Ed Kane's, but this has in turn been criticized as an inefficient use of taxpayer money.

In 2016, the Baltimore Water Taxi service was purchased by Sagamore Ventures, operated by Harbor Boating, Inc. Under the new ownership, the Baltimore Water Taxi has plans to expand transportation service to Port Covington in South Baltimore.

== Routes ==
The BWT has five taxi routes and one Harbor Connector route that circulate the Patapsco River from Memorial Day to Labor Day.

- Red: Two-stop route from Harborplace to Fell's Point.
- Green: Circulates counterclockwise from Harbor East to Rusty Scupper (stopping at piers 1-5 & 7).
- Yellow: Circulates counterclockwise from Fell's Point to Tide Point (stopping at piers 4, 7, 8, 10 & 11).
- Purple: Two-stop route from Fell's Point to Fort McHenry.
- Blue: Circulates counterclockwise from Captain James Landing to Canton Waterfront Park (stopping at piers 10, 11, 14, & 16)
- Harbor Connector: Connects Maritime Park to Tide Point and Canton Waterfront Park. Runs Monday thru Friday 7:00 AM to 7:00 PM.

== Stops ==
As of 2016, the system has five taxi lines with seventeen stops throughout the Inner Harbor.

| Number | Name | Location | Landmarks | Connections |
|---|---|---|---|---|
| 1 | Aquarium | 501 East Pratt Street; National Aquarium | Baltimore World Trade Center; National Aquarium; Power Plant Live! | Shot Tower–Market Place; MTA 7, 10, 31 |
| 2 | Harborplace | 201 East Pratt Street; Harborplace | The Gallery; Harborplace Shops; McKeldin Square; USS Constellation; Visitor Center | Charles Center; Orange Circulator; MTA 7, 10, 19, 31, 119; Baltimore Bike Share Station 5 |
| 3 | Science Center | 601 Light Street; Maryland Science Center | Maryland Science Center; Rash Field | Banner Circulator; MTA 64 |
| 4 | Rusty Scupper | 402 Key Highway; Federal Hill | American Visionary Art Museum; Federal Hill Park; Rusty Scupper Restaurant | Banner Circulator |
| 5 | Pier Five | Pier 5 Seven Foot Knoll Light | Institute of Marine and Environmental Technology; Pier Six Pavilion; USCGC Taney | Shot Tower–Market Place; Orange Circulator |
| 7 | Harbor East | East Falls Avenue/Aliceanna Street; Harbor East | Harbor East Shopping & Dining; Little Italy | Baltimore Bike Share Station 6 |
| 8 | Maritime Park | Thames Street/Block Street; Harbor Poinit | Bond Street Wharf; Frederick Douglass-Isaac Myers Maritime Park | Green Circulator; Baltimore Bike Share Station 4 |
| 10 | Tide Point | North end of Hull Street; Locust Point | Tide Point; Latrobe Park; Under Armour HQ | |
| 11 | Fell's Point | Thames Street/Broadway Square; Fell's Point | Broadway Market; Historic Fell's Point; Thames Street Park | |
| 14 | Captain James Landing | 2121 Aliceanna Street; Fell's Point | Captain James Crabhouse; Holy Rosary Church; Patterson Park | MTA 13, 31 |
| 16 | Canton Waterfront Park | 3001 Boston Street; Canton | DuBurns Arena; O'Donnell Square | MTA 13, 31 |
| 17 | Fort McHenry | Constellation Plaza; Fort McHenry | Historic Fort McHenry; Star-Spangled Banner National Historic Trail | Banner Circulator; MTA 1 |

== See also ==
- Living Classrooms Foundation, was a competitor operating the Harbor Shuttle service in Baltimore's Harbor until closing after an accident in March 2004.
