= Lexington Market station (Metro SubwayLink) =

Metro SubwayLink station

Lexington Market
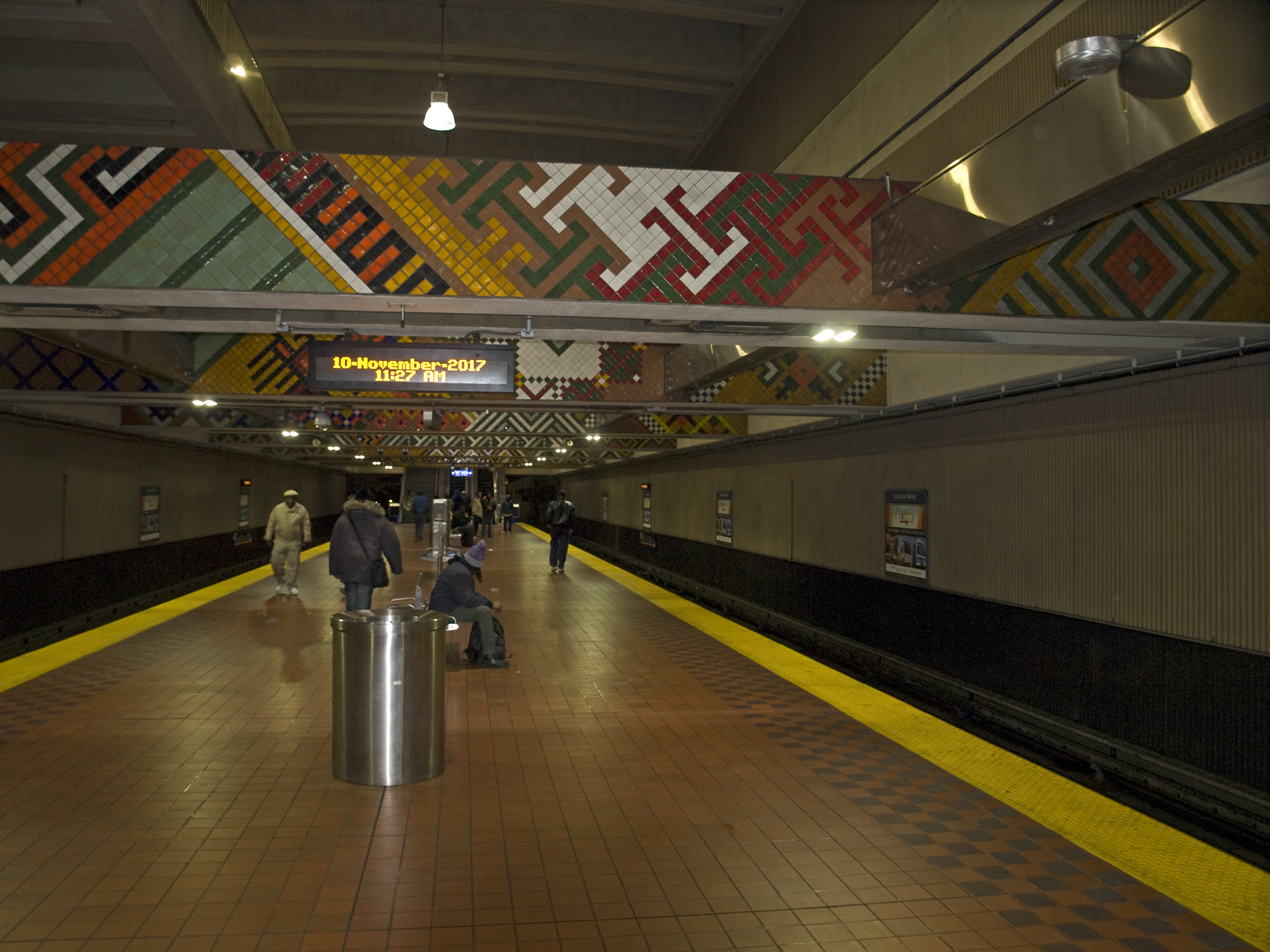

General information
- Location: 301 North Eutaw Street (north entrance); 320 West Lexington Street (south entrance); Baltimore, MD 21201
- Coordinates: 39°17′29.48″N 76°37′15.57″W
- Owner: Maryland Transit Administration
- Platforms: 1 island platform
- Tracks: 2
- Connections: Light RailLink (at Lexington Market station); MTA Maryland Buses

Construction
- Parking: Street
- Cycle facilities: Bike Share Stop #18 (14 docks)
- Accessible: Yes

History
- Opened: November 21, 1983

Passengers
- 2017: 4,906 daily

Services
Preceding station	Maryland Transit Administration	Following station
State Center toward Owings Mills	Metro SubwayLink	Charles Center toward Johns Hopkins Hospital
Location

Lexington Market station is an underground Metro SubwayLink station in Baltimore, Maryland. It is one of 3 stops in the downtown Baltimore area. The station is a transportation hub, a designated transfer station to the Light RailLink Lexington Market station. The station is also served by a number of bus lines.

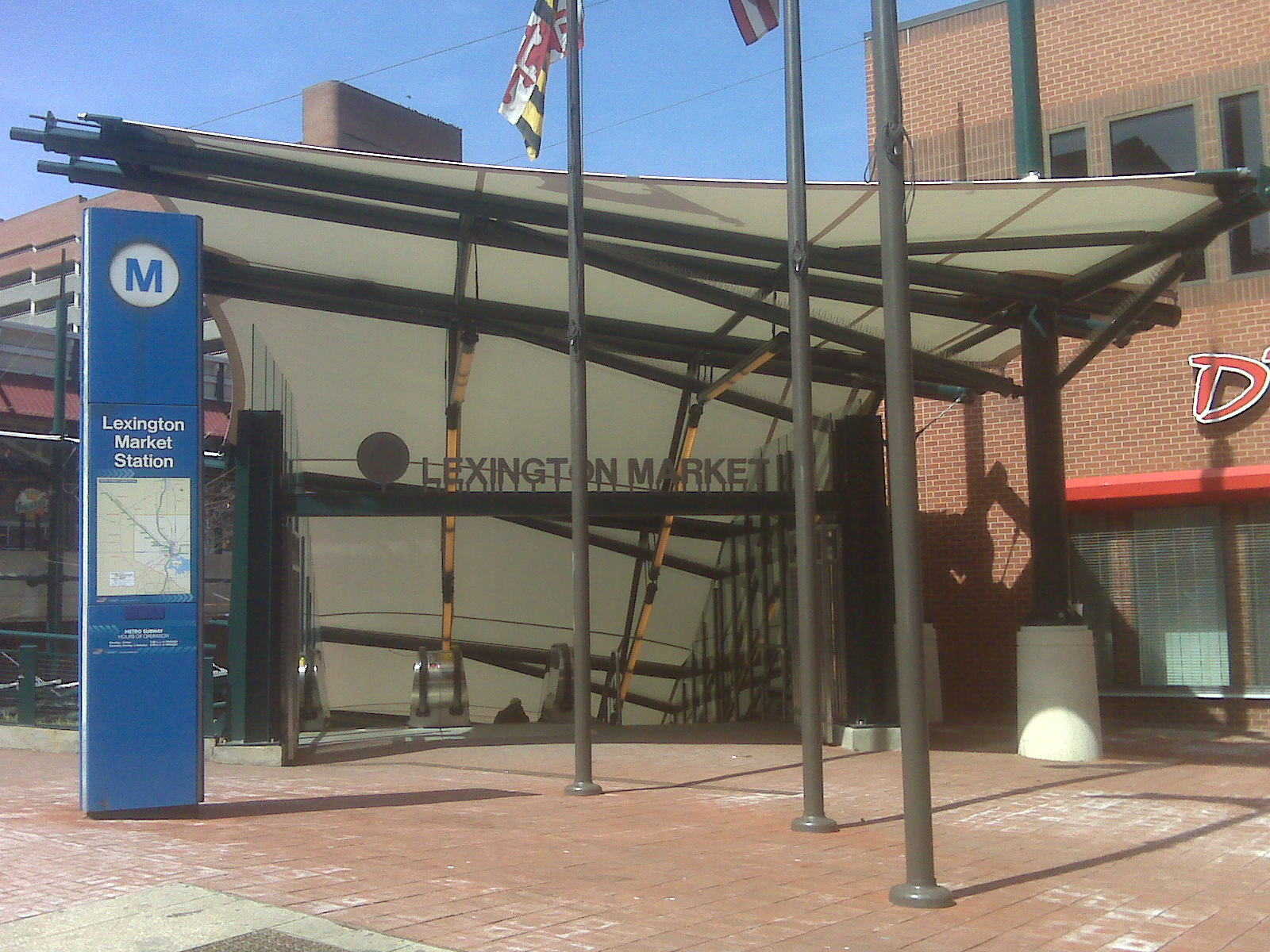
Station entrance

== Accessibility ==
The station is compliant with the Americans with Disabilities Act of 1990. There is a single elevator at the Saratoga Street entrance, but no elevator at the Lexington Street entrance. Due to the lack of redundant elevators, wheelchair users cannot use the station in the event that the elevator is not operational.

== Artwork ==
The concrete beams above the station platform are decorated with a ceramic mosaic created by Baltimore artist Patricia Alexander for a commission of $68,300.

== Bus connections ==
The station has two entrances, one on Lexington Street and one on Saratoga Street. The Lexington Street entrance is located directly across from the main entrance to Lexington Market. The Saratoga Street entrance is a block away, and is located at the stops for bus routes:

- 5, 15, 19, 23, 27, 47, 91, 120, 150, 320
- Baltimore Light Rail
