= The Cloisters (Lutherville, Maryland) =

Historic house in Maryland, United States

- U.S. National Register of Historic Places
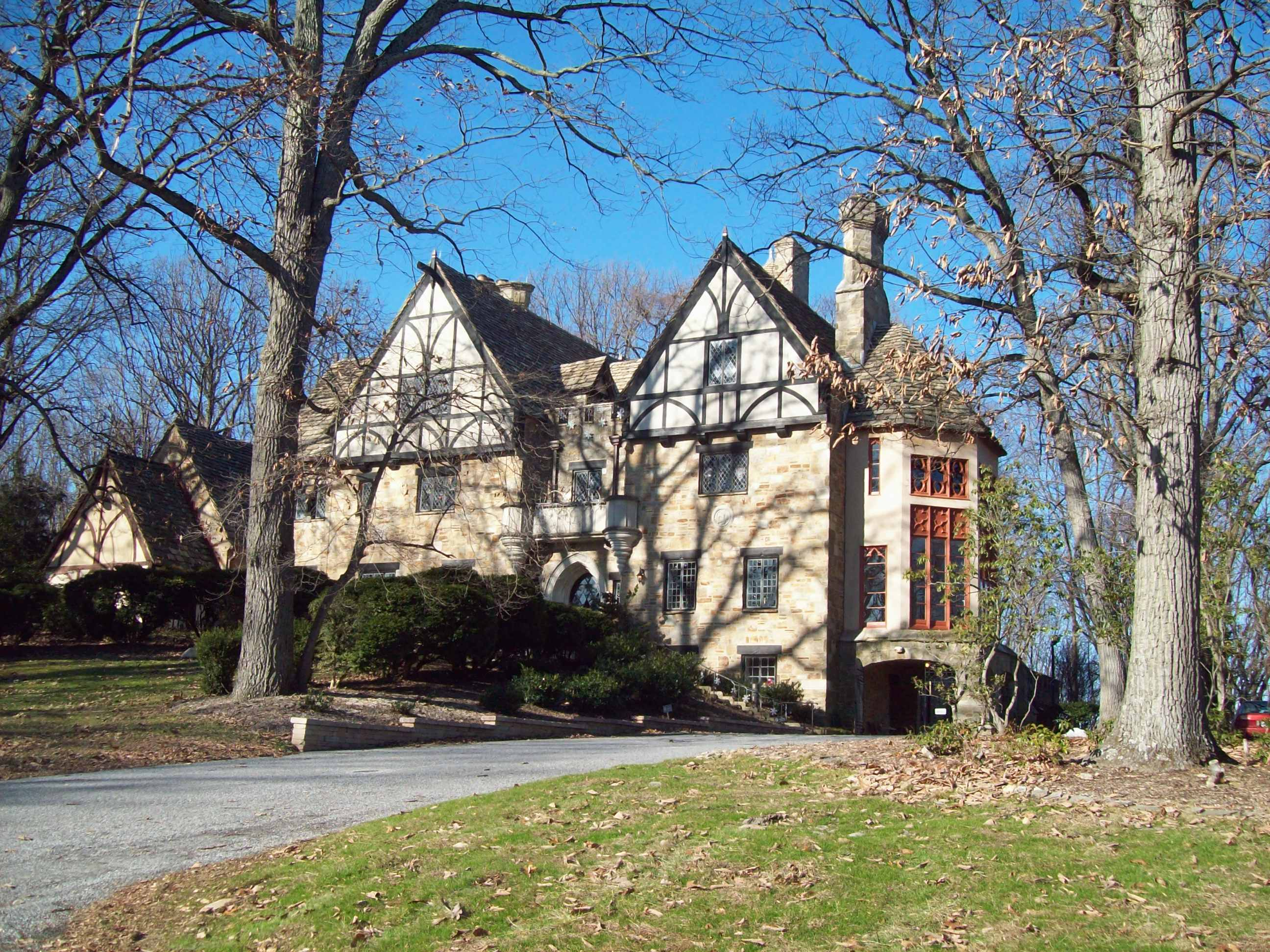
- The Cloisters in December 2009

- Location within Maryland Location within the United States
- Location: 10440 Falls Road, west of Lutherville, Maryland
- Coordinates: 39°24′39″N 76°40′17″W
- Area: 53 acres (21 ha)
- Built: 1930
- Architect: Sumner A. Parker
- Architectural style: Late Gothic Revival
- NRHP reference No.: 79001115
- Added to NRHP: August 7, 1979

The Cloisters, also known as Cloisters Castle, is a historic home in Lutherville, Baltimore County, Maryland, United States. The building was completed in 1932, after three years of construction. The house is 4 stories, irregular in elevation and plan, with much architectural ornament. It is built of large, random-sized blocks of a native gray and gold colored rock known as Butler stone, with details principally of sandstone, wood from the site, plaster, and wrought iron. Many structural elements were salvaged from other buildings in the US and Europe, including several items from the Glen Ellen Mansion, which had been near Loch Raven Reservoir. The main façade is dominated by two asymmetrically placed, projecting sections topped by massive half-timbered gables that were originally part of a Medieval house in Domrémy, France. It also has a massive stone octagonal stair tower, which contains a stone and wrought-iron spiral staircase and is crowned by a crenellated parapet and a small, round, stone-roofed structure from which one can exit onto the roof of the main tower. The house's roof is constructed of overlapping flagstones secured by iron pins, the only roof of this kind in America.

The property is owned by Baltimore City and operated by the Baltimore Office of Promotion and Arts, although it is located in Baltimore County. The city ran a children's museum in the building until 1996, when it moved to the Inner Harbor area and was renamed Port Discovery. The Cloisters is currently operated as a rental facility, hosting over 250 weddings, parties, bar/bat mitzvahs, and gatherings per year.

The Cloisters was listed on the National Register of Historic Places in 1979.

== In popular culture ==
On December 31, 1997, about 100 guests attended the wedding of Jada Pinkett Smith and Will Smith at The Cloisters.
