= Mt. Vernon station (Light RailLink) =

Light rail station in Baltimore, Maryland, US

Mt. Vernon
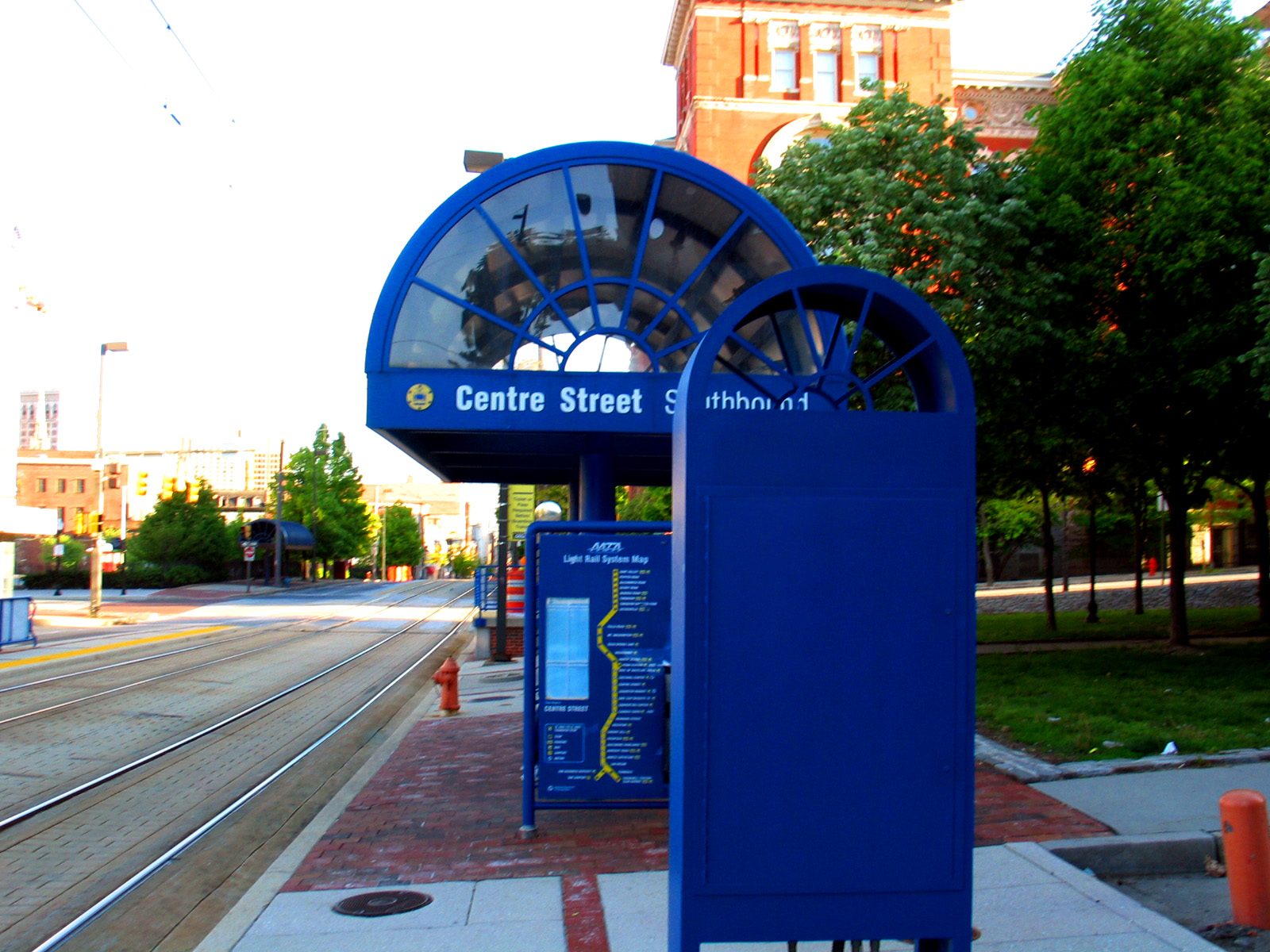
- The station in May 2005

General information
- Location: 540 North Howard Street; Baltimore, Maryland
- Coordinates: 39°17′48.9″N 76°37′11.9″W
- Owner: Maryland Transit Administration
- Platforms: 2 side platforms
- Tracks: 2
- Connections: 5, 10, 14, 19, 27, 91, 120, 320

Construction
- Cycle facilities: Bike Share Stop #23 (11 docks)
- Accessible: Yes

History
- Opened: April 2, 1992
- Former names: Centre Street (1992–2017)

Passengers
- 2017: 452 daily

Services
Preceding station	Maryland Transit Administration	Following station
Lexington Market toward BWI Airport or Glen Burnie	Light RailLink	Cultural Center toward Hunt Valley
Lexington Market toward Camden Yards	Light RailLink Penn–Camden Shuttle	Cultural Center toward Penn Station
Location

Mt. Vernon station (formerly Centre Street station) is a Baltimore Light RailLink station in the Mount Vernon neighborhood of Baltimore, Maryland, United States.

The Mount Vernon stop is located near the Walters Art Museum, and a former Greyhound Bus terminal.
