= Pier Six Pavilion =

Music venue in Baltimore, Maryland, US

Coordinates: 39°17′1″N 76°36′15″W

Pier 6 Pavilion
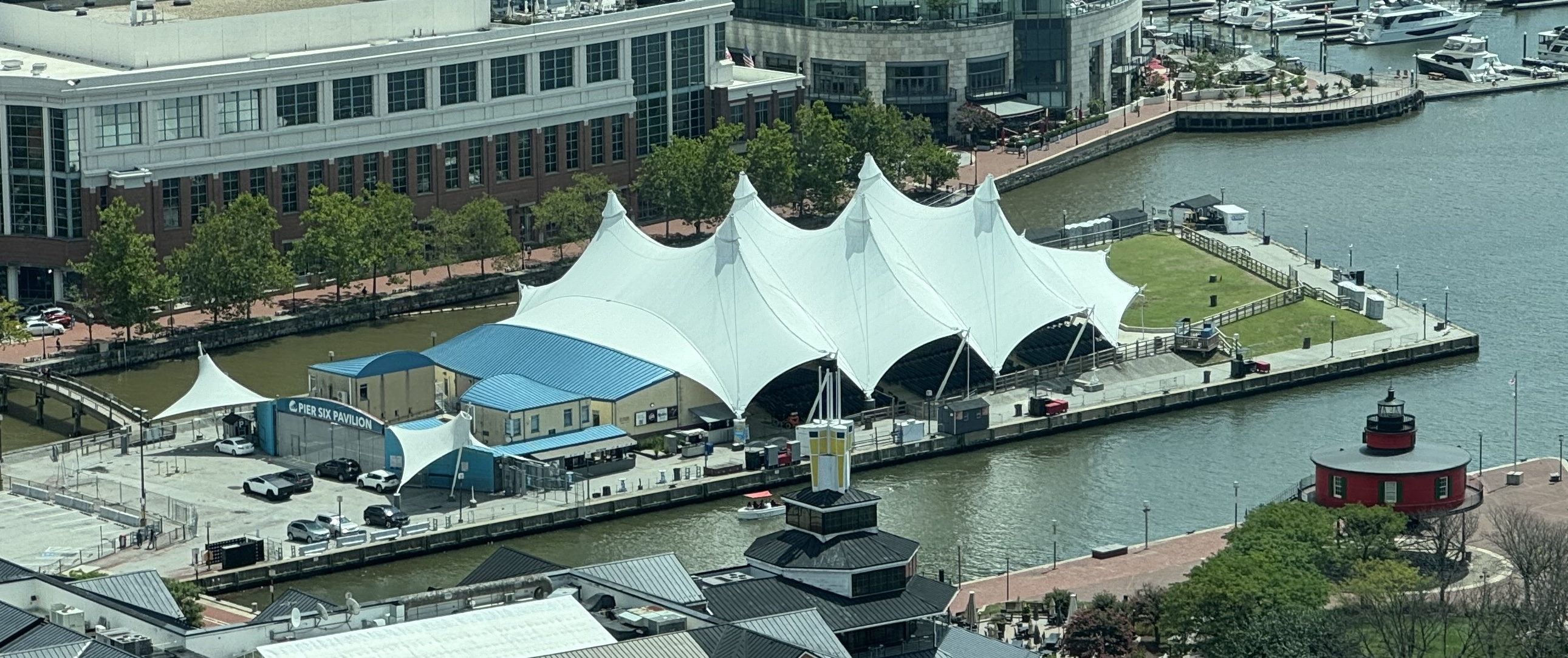
- Interactive map of Pier 6 Pavilion
- Former names: Harbor Lights Concert Pavilion (1981-1991); Pier Six Concert Pavilion (1991-2004); Cavalier Telephone Pavilion (2004-2006); Pier Six Pavilion (2006-2018); MECU Pavilion (2018-2021)
- Address: 731 Eastern Ave; Baltimore, MD 21202-4320
- Location: Inner Harbor
- Owner: City of Baltimore
- Operator: The Finn Group; Knitting Co. Entertainment
- Capacity: 4,600
- Public transit: Shot Tower / Market Place

Construction
- Built: 1981
- Opened: 1981
- Renovated: 1991; 2006; 2018

Pier Six Pavilion is a music venue located in Baltimore, Maryland. The waterfront venue is located on Pier Six of the Inner Harbor and opened in 1981.

== History ==
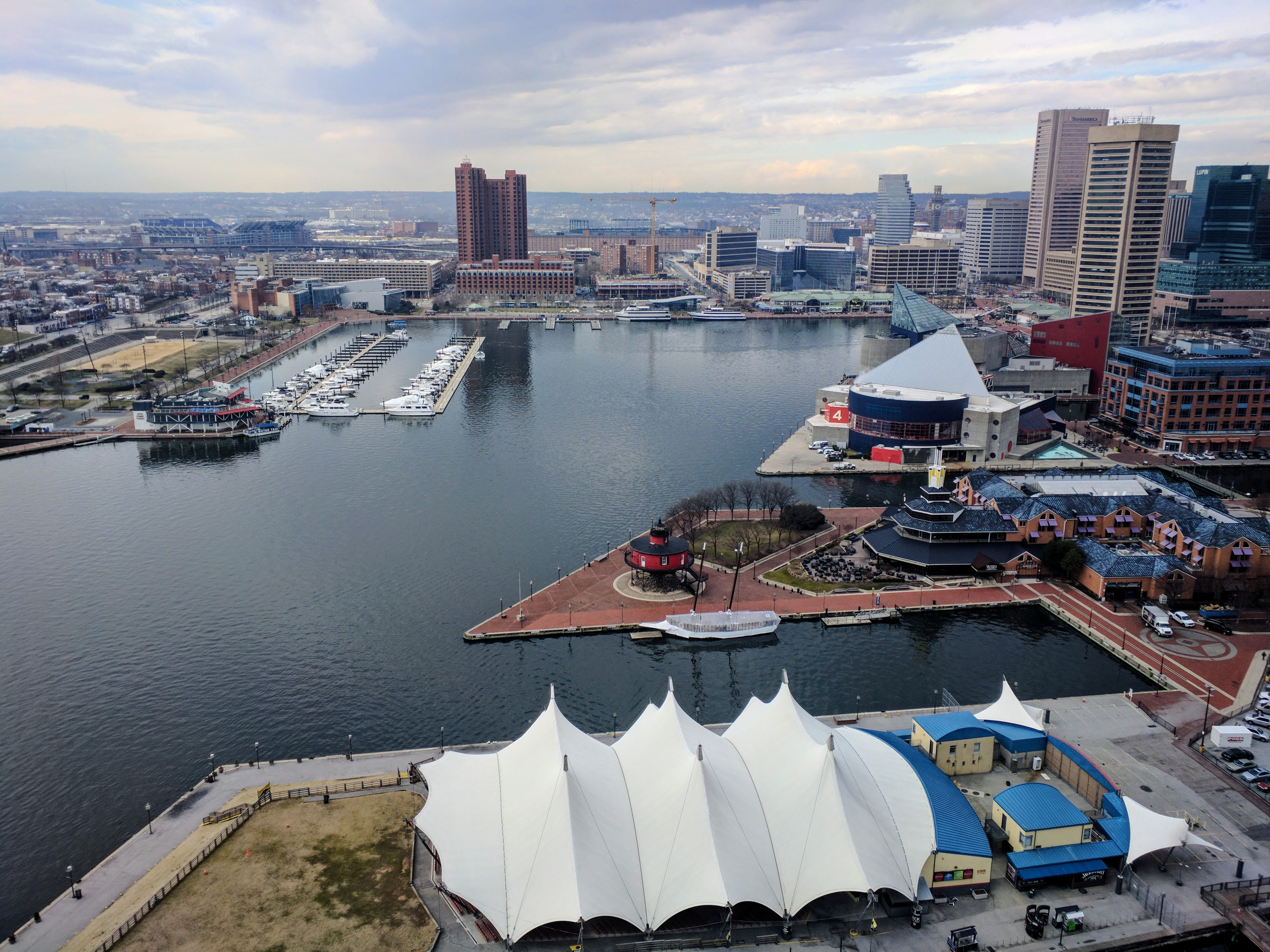
Pier Six Pavilion, foreground, with an overview of Inner Harbor

The venue opened in 1981 as a temporary structure known as the "Harbor Lights Concert Pavilion", with a capacity of 3,133. In 1990, the City of Baltimore enlisted Future Tents Limited (now known as FTL Associates) to create a permanent structure. The $4.9 million renovation was completed in July 1991, now known as the "Pier Six Concert Pavilion", with an increased capacity of 4,341. In 2004, the venue was briefly known as the "Cavalier Telephone Pavilion", until the City restored its original name in 2006.

On November 30, 2016, a contract was approved to allow Live Nation and SMG co-operate Pier Six for up to 10 years. As part of the agreement, the pavilion underwent a $4 million renovation that includes the installation of a new tent and seats. Following renovations, the venue capacity was increased to 4,600.

The naming rights of the venue were sold to the Municipal Employees Credit Union of Baltimore in April 2018, effectively changing its name to "MECU Pavilion."

The Finn Group and New York's Knitting Company Entertainment were selected as the new operators of the Pier Six Pavilion in March 2026.

== Noted performers ==
- Al Green
- Avicii
- B.B. King
- Britney Spears
- Chuck Berry
- Coldplay
- Diana Ross
- The Doobie Brothers
- Donna Summer
- Erykah Badu
- Etta James
- Fats Domino
- Guster
- Goo Goo Dolls
- Hall & Oates
- Harry Connick Jr.
- Jackson Browne
- Jethro Tull
- Jill Scott
- Johnny Cash
- Judas Priest
- Pierce the Veil
- Ray Charles
- Steely Dan
- Stevie Ray Vaughan
- Sum 41
- Umphrey's McGee
- The Used
- Tom Jones
- Tracy Chapman
