= Port Discovery (museum) =

Non-profit organization in Baltimore, Maryland, US

Coordinates: 39°17′20″N 76°36′23″W

Port Discovery Children's Museum

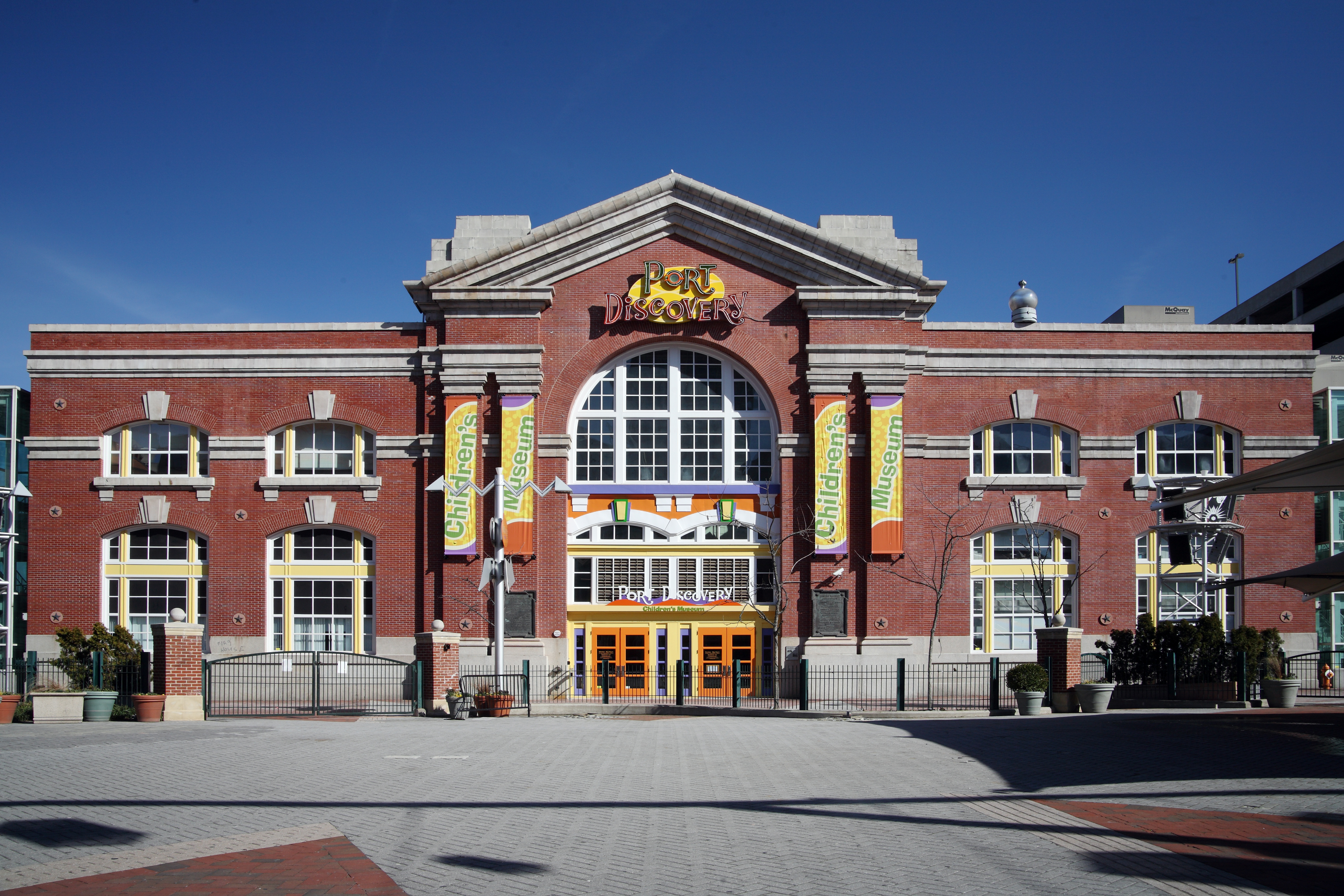
- Established: December 29, 1998; 27 years ago
- Location: 35 Market Place; Baltimore, Maryland 21202
- Founders: Cloisters Children's Museum; Maryland Children's Museum
- President: Carter Arnot Polakoff
- CEO: Carter Arnot Polakoff
- Architects: Schwartz/Silver Architects (original); CambridgeSeven (expansions)
- Owner: City of Baltimore
- Public transit access: at Shot Tower; BaltimoreLink routes Blue, Orange, Brown, Purple, 63, 65, 150; Charm City Circulator Green Route
- Parking: Harbor Park Garage at 55 Market Place
- Website: www.portdiscovery.org
- Building details
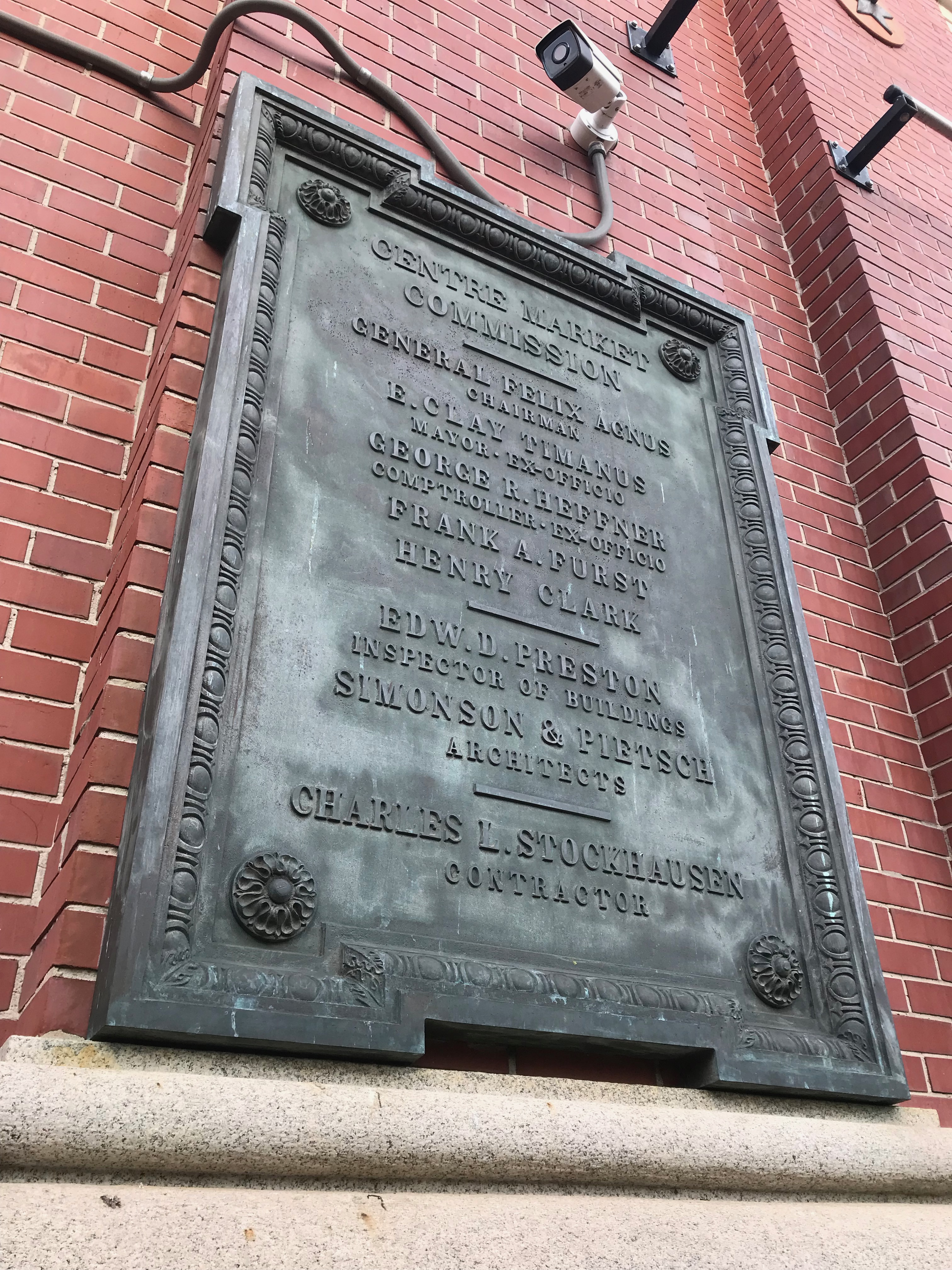
- Commemorative plaque explaining the entities responsible for the Baltimore Centre Market

Design and construction
- Developer: The Rouse Company
- Main contractor: Walt Disney Imagineering
- Baltimore Wholesale Fish Market
- Built: c. 1906–1907
- Architect: Simonson & Pietsch
- Architectural style: Neoclassical
- Part of: Business and Government Historic District
- Added to NRHP: November 23, 1987

Port Discovery Children's Museum is a non-profit institution located in the historic Wholesale Fish Market building in Baltimore's Inner Harbor. It has 80,000 square feet (7,400 m^{2}) and three floors of exhibits and programs designed to be interactive and educational. It receives more than 265,000 visitors annually. The museum's focus is on children ages birth through 10 and their caregivers.

Prior to being redeveloped into a museum, the building's early revitalization effort was the development of a shopping mall and entertainment complex known as The Fishmarket, which opened in November 1988 and closed in July 1989 due to financial and operational problems. The Rouse Co. and Walt Disney Imagineering collaborated to support construction and redevelopment after the Cloisters Children's Museum merged with the Maryland Children's Museum in 1990, forming Port Discovery. The museum is served by the Baltimore Metro Subway's Shot Tower/Market Place station.

== History ==
=== Background ===
==== 1906–1984: Wholesale Fish Market ====
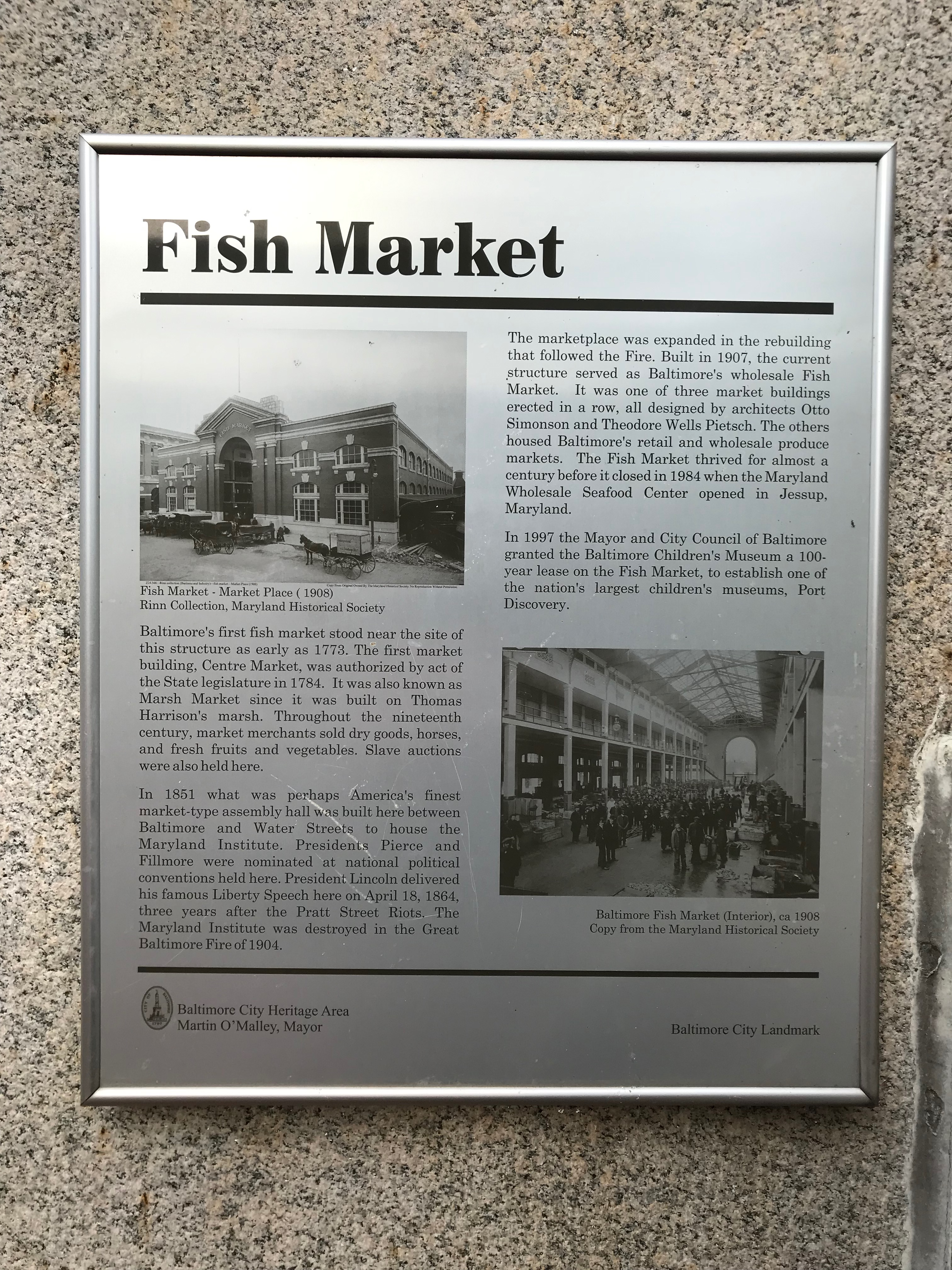
Interpretive sign at Port Discovery explaining the history of the Fish Market

The physical building housing Port Discovery was formerly the Baltimore Wholesale Fish Market, on the site of the Baltimore Centre Market, also known as the Marsh Market, which was established at the area in 1773 at 35 Market Place.

After the marketplace was destroyed by the Great Baltimore Fire of February 7–8, 1904, the City of Baltimore cleared the debris and completely replaced it by constructing three large, modern Neoclassical or Beaux-Arts style brick market buildings (the Wholesale Produce, Retail, and the Wholesale Fish markets) between 1906 and 1907, designed by prominent local architects Simonson & Pietsch. However, the remaining operational components of this market system, including the Fish Market, permanently ceased operations in 1984, when the city's commercial seafood and distribution hub relocated to the Maryland Wholesale Seafood Market (also known as the Maryland Market Center) in Jessup, Maryland. The structures were immediately gutted and demolished to clear the land for modern development, with the exception of the Wholesale Fish Market building.

==== 1985–1994: The Fishmarket ====
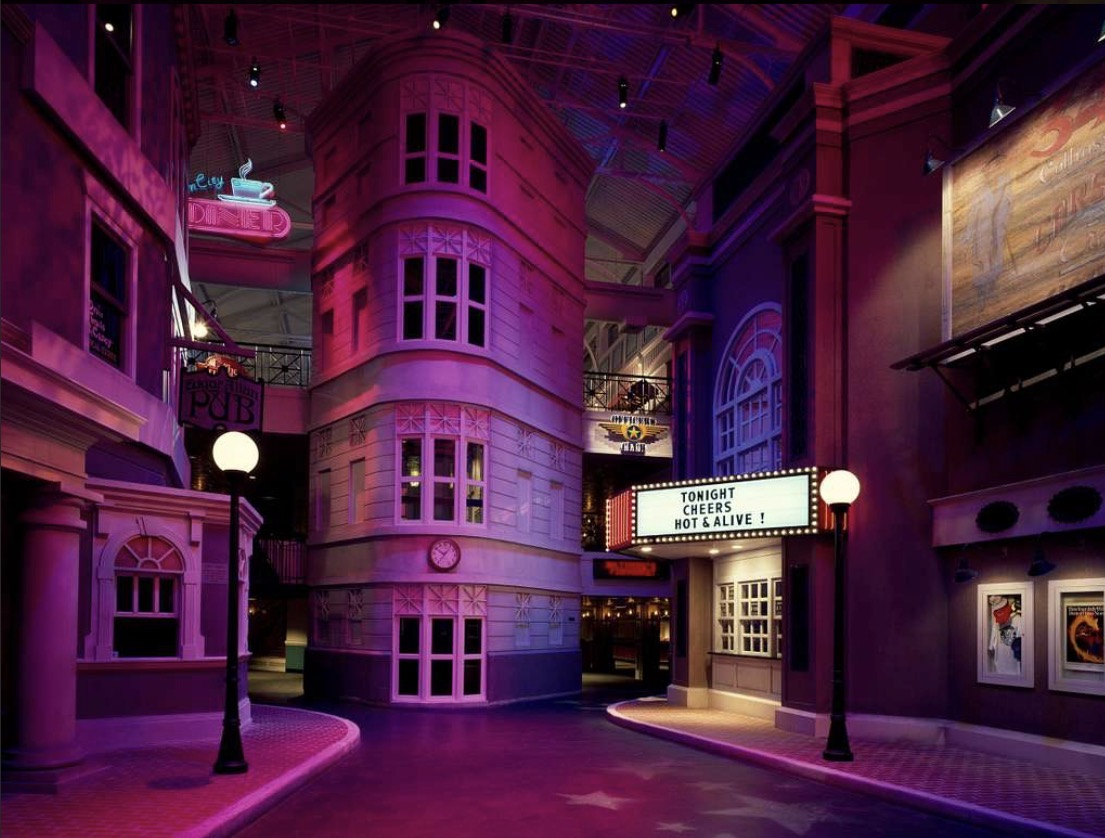
Concourse at night, c. late 1980s

Central atrium, c. late 1980s

Two years prior to the building's closure, the Produce and Retail markets were converted into The Brokerage, a department store and office complex. In December 1985, United Artists Theatres opened the Movies at Harbor Park 9-screen cinema at 55 Market Place, leaving the Fish Market adjacent to both buildings vacant.

In 1984 and 1985, the Baltimore Development Corporation (BDC) held the historic project files, Request for Proposals (RFPs), and urban renewal records concerning the Inner Harbor and Market Place sites. In 1985, the city sold the deteriorating structure to the Boston, Massachusetts-based McCourt Co., led by Frank H. McCourt Jr., for $900,000, amid vandalism occurring at the former Fish Market. McCourt invested in $25 million to perform adaptive reuse on the building by redeveloping it into the Fishmarket, a shopping mall and entertainment complex, which had its grand opening on November 17, 1988.

The mall featured an interconnected complex of six distinct themed nightclubs and two restaurants, all managed under a unified concept by the Nashville, Tennessee-based entertainment giant Opryland USA, a subsidiary of the Gaylord Entertainment Company. This included the Edgar Allan Poe Club, the South Pacific U.S.O. Club and the Eubie Blake Club.

Despite the success, a cash-flow dispute occurred. Opryland claimed it had to unexpectedly pump $4.5 million of its own cash into the venue just to keep it afloat during its opening months, and when McCourt failed to supply a required $1 million letter of credit to stabilize operations, Opryland retaliated by abruptly locking the doors overnight and firing 350 to400 employees without warning on July 24, 1989, which was only eight months of operation. This sparked an immediate $346 million lawsuit and counterclaim battle in Baltimore City Circuit Court that year. Furthermore, McCourt never properly paid the $25 million to the subcontractors that handled the renovation, and by early 1989, multiple local contractors successfully filed $2 million in mechanic's liens against the property, giving contractors the legal right to force a foreclosure sale of the building to recoup their losses.

From an operational standpoint, the mall was largely unsuccessful for locals. To enter the complex and access the various nightclubs, patrons faced a steep, mandatory cover charge just to get through the front door, on top of high drink prices, which alienated Baltimore residents and local college students. Furthermore, the Market Place corridor also lacked adequate parking and suffered competition from Harborplace & The Gallery; while the UA Harbor Park 9 was connected to the Harbor Park Garage, visitors did not want to pay or waste time being frustrated when they can get the same experience for free in the suburbs.

The mall relied heavily on alcohol sales, a business model that local nightlife experts at the time warned was beginning to fail in the late 1980s. While the Fishmarket saw heavy weekend traffic from out-of-town tourists visiting the nearby Inner Harbor, it suffered from critically low attendance on weeknights, and the specialized concepts failed to generate repeat visits from local Baltimoreans, who preferred established, authentic local venues, including Hammerjacks.

The Cordish Companies, a local development firm led by David S. Cordish, formed a 50/50 joint venture with the McCourt Co. to aggressively renovate and reopen the Fishmarket by June 1994. Cordish went as aggressive as maintaining that he was fully moving forward with the revival project independently after the City of Baltimore threatened to step in and condemn the property to seize control. To move forward, he negotiated with then-Mayor Kurt L. Schmoke for a drastic reduction in city property taxes to stabilize the venue's overhead costs, and forcing the city to reserve a large block of parking spaces at the nearby 414 Water Street garage to avoid a repeat failure.

However, the plan was canceled later that year, with Cordish warning that the concept was fundamentally doomed from the start. He noted that the building "didn't appeal to grown-ups, didn't appeal to kids," and focused on redeveloping the Brokerage into Power Plant Live!.

==== 1976–1994: Cloisters Children's Museum ====
While the physical building had its own history, the redevelopment into a children's museum dates back to 1976, when it opened as the Cloisters Children's Museum, originally located in a historic estate known as The Cloisters, situated in rural Lutherville in Baltimore County and separate from the Inner Harbor. The suburban location harmed the museum's potential attendance, accessibility for inner-city youth, and overall physical expansion.

=== 1990–1998: Development and opening ===
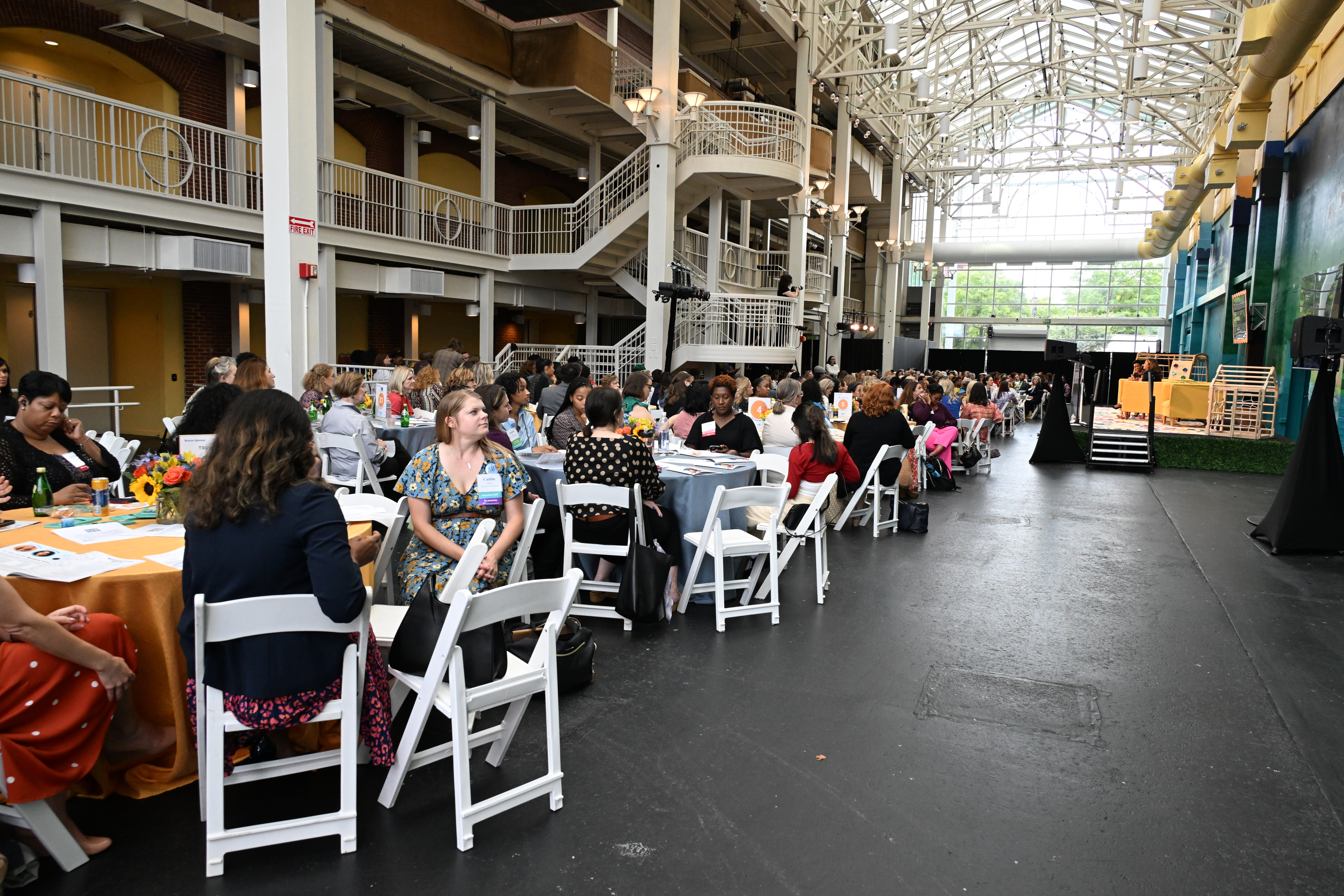
Interior view (September 2024)

In 1990, the institution formed a merger with the Maryland Children's Museum, which relocated to downtown Baltimore to replace the failed 1980s Fishmarket Mall. A $35 million capital fundraising campaign was established, and that money would be used to buy out the remaining real estate entanglements, completely gut the interior of the 1906 Wholesale Fish Market building, and install cutting-edge interactive architecture. The Cloisters Children's Museum announced on June 17, 1994 that it would permanently close its doors on September 4 of that year.

Announced in March 1995, Harborplace developer The Rouse Company of Columbia, Maryland would help guide the new development of the museum, drawing directly from Walt Disney Imagineering to combine Disney's hyper-themed environments with Rouse's industrial architecture. However, by October 1996, the plans were on hold; While the state, city, and various corporations had pledged significant money, the museum’s board was still $10 million short of its $25 million fundraising goal. Because they refused to break ground or sign construction contracts without the full funding securely in hand, everything stalled, and in the middle of this financial crunch, the museum's original executive director, Mindy S. Rosenberg, abruptly resigned. The board launched a national search and hired a new president and CEO, Kathy Dwyer Southern, who aggressively restructured the capital campaign—raising the ultimate budget to $32 million to fully clear out the lingering real estate entanglements—which finally allowed them to break ground.

Construction on Port Discovery Children's Museum officially began in early 1997, and the facility would have its grand opening on December 29, 1998.

=== 2019–present: Success and expansions ===
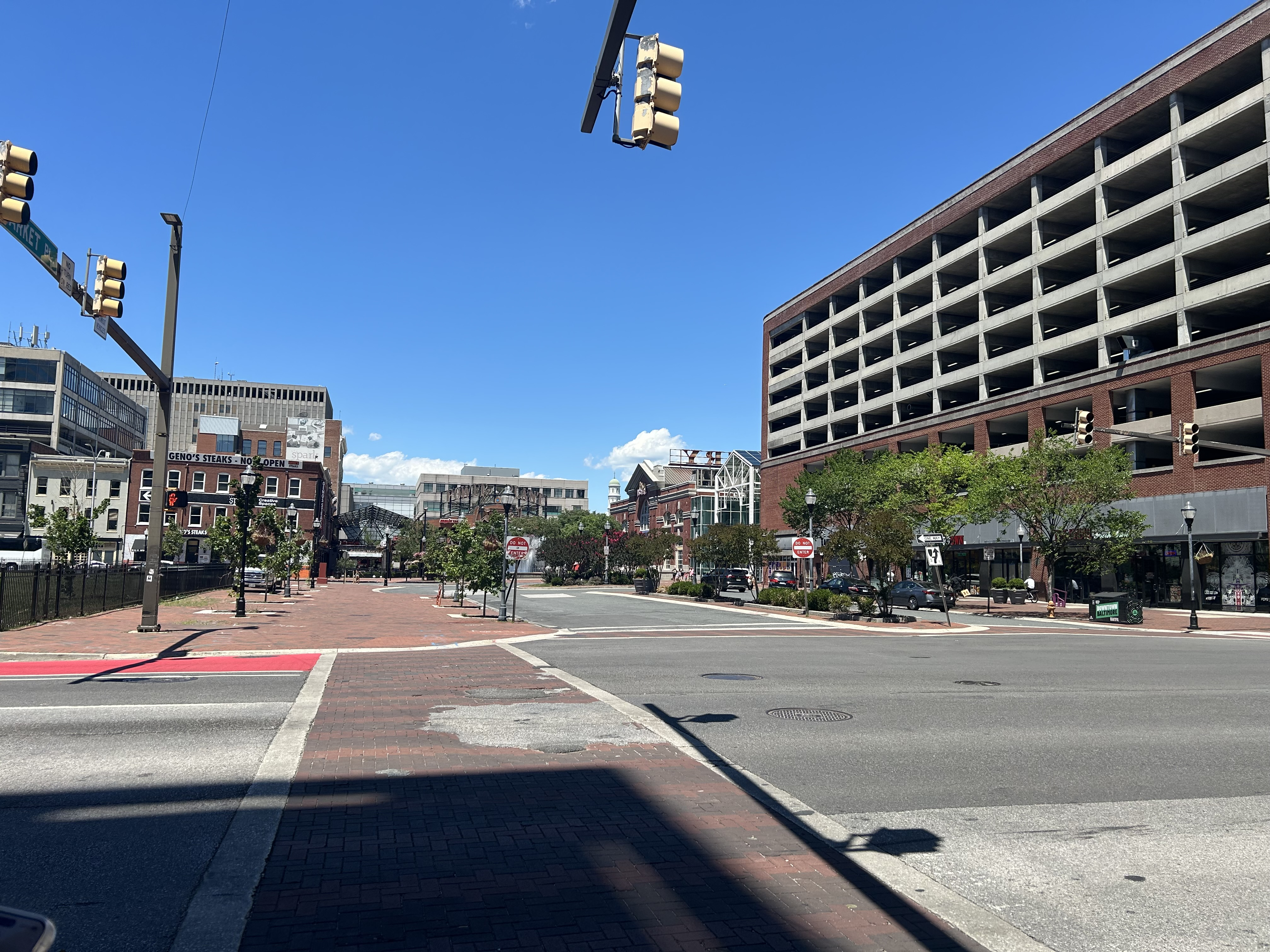
Harbor Park Garage (right edge), Port Discovery (closer to center), and Power Plant Live! (middle, June 2026)

Within its first decade, Port Discovery was routinely awarded one of the top children's museums in the United States by outlets such as Child Magazine and Forbes, and started a $10.5 million capital campaign on May 15, 2018 to add two exhibits, which began construction in early January of that year and would open on June 20, 2019, after surpassing five million visitors in the spring of that year. The grand reopening would consolidate with the fundraiser Play It Forward.

The National Maritime Heritage Program, the National Park Service, and the U.S. Department of the Interior funded the new exhibits, ensuring they are permanent alongside the addition of the four-story SkyClimber cloud-climbing exhibit. Museum president and CEO Bryn Parchman explained that the exhibits were part of a long-term master plan to add five exhibits to the museum, with the upcoming three to focus on nature, art, and space. The upcoming additions, alongside interior improvements such as restrooms and family seating, would also have fundraising campaigns, aiming to reach $15 million for this project. SkyClimber was created to replace the outdated KidWorks climbing exhibit to reopen sights of the historic Fish Market building.

The architect for this project was CambridgeSeven of Cambridge, Massachusetts, with Lewis Contractors as the main contractor and Roto of Dublin, Ohio as the designer of the new exhibits. A Chesapeake Bay-themed play area featuring Chessie was tucked under the S.S. Friend Ship exhibit, itself pays homage to the Port of Baltimore. In February 2022, the museum also functioned as a children's vaccine clinic for COVID-19.

In June 2024, the museum threw a massive "Community Birthday Bash" to celebrate its 25th anniversary of occupying the old 1906 Wholesale Fish Market building, showcasing new rotating STEM and art galleries designed for next-generation learners, and the unveiling of a transformative five-year, $17.5 million structural and educational master plan on January 18, 2024 spearheaded by Board Chairman Dennis Rasmussen and CEO Carter Polakoff. The proposal would feature the new rotations as permanent fixtures, alongside a massive, stylized indoor public art installation on the Atrium's south wall known as the Chesapeake Mural, painted by local artist Bridget Cimino to celebrate the Maryland landscape. Hops & Vines was established on February 24, 2024 and brought in over 500 regional guests and raised over $10,000 for upcoming exhibit designs. Play It Forward was established again on April 12, 2024 to gather corporate sponsors and donors to support future development.

== Awards and accolades ==
Port Discovery has served over 2.5 million visitors and ranks among the top Children's Museums in the U.S. by Parents Magazine (2015) and Forbes (2012).

In 2009, Port Discovery received the MetLife Foundation and Association of Children's Museums Promising Practice Award for their partnership with PACT: Helping Children with Special Needs.

In January 2011, Port Discovery was designated as a “Good to Grow Museum” for promoting healthy living for families. They are one of six children's museums out of 350 nationally and internationally to receive this designation. This national recognition comes from the Association of Children's Museums.

== See also ==
- Imagination Station in Toledo, Ohio
