= Shot Tower station =

Metro SubwayLink station

Coordinates: 39°17′23.86″N 76°36′21.03″W

Shot Tower
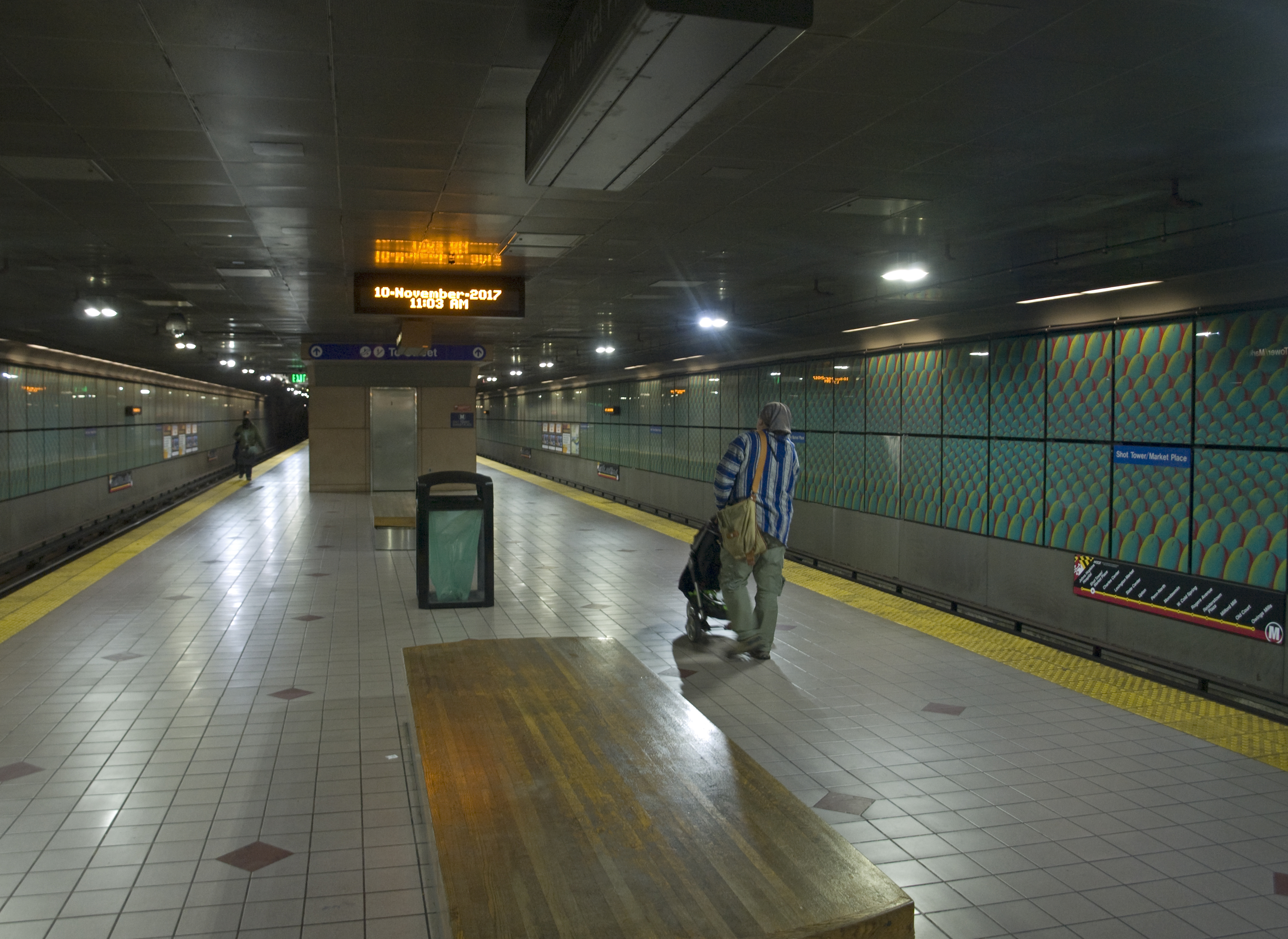
- Shot Tower station 2017

General information
- Location: Baltimore and South President Streets; Baltimore, Maryland
- Owner: Maryland Transit Administration
- Platforms: 1
- Tracks: 2
- Connections: MTA Maryland Buses

Construction
- Parking: Street
- Cycle facilities: Bike Share Stop #7 (12 docks)
- Accessible: Yes

History
- Opened: May 1995
- Former names: Shot Tower/Market Place (1995–2017)

Passengers
- 2017: 1,712 daily

Services
Preceding station	Maryland Transit Administration	Following station
Charles Center toward Owings Mills	Metro SubwayLink	Johns Hopkins Hospital Terminus
Location

Shot Tower station (formerly Shot Tower/Market Place station) is an underground Metro SubwayLink station in Baltimore, Maryland. It is in the central part of the city, in close proximity to many well-known landmarks, including the Shot Tower for which it is named, Port Discovery, Power Plant Live!, the Harbor campus of Baltimore City Community College, the National Aquarium, the Flag House, City Hall, and Little Italy. The station has two street-level entrances, but unlike other Baltimore Metro stations that do, both these entrances share a common gate inside the station. The Shot Tower station is one of two stops in the third phase of the Baltimore Metro, having opened in 1995. Originally named Shot Tower/Market Place to showcase the proximity to the Market Place development, MTA Maryland dropped Market Place from its title with the 2017 rebranding of BaltimoreLink.

Four display cases of artifacts found when digging during the construction of the station may be seen on the west side of the upper level of the station, on the unpaid side of the faregates.

== Media ==
In Season 2, Episode 1 of House of Cards, U.S. Rep. Frank Underwood (D-S.C.) meets with reporter Zoe Barnes at the fictitious Cathedral Heights Metro station. The actual scene was filmed at Shot Tower station in Baltimore.

== Gallery ==
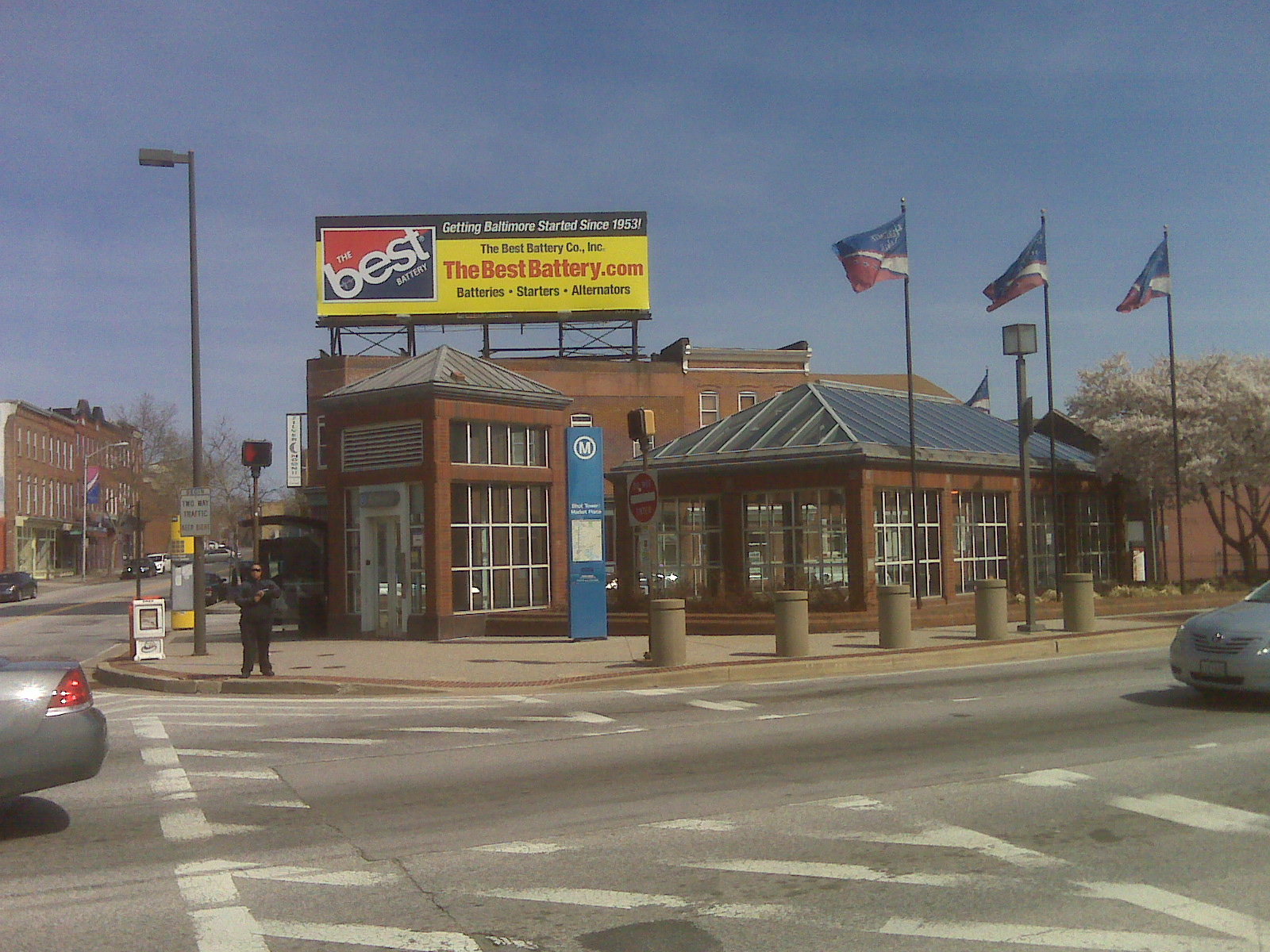
The east entrance to the Shot Tower Metro SubwayLink station.

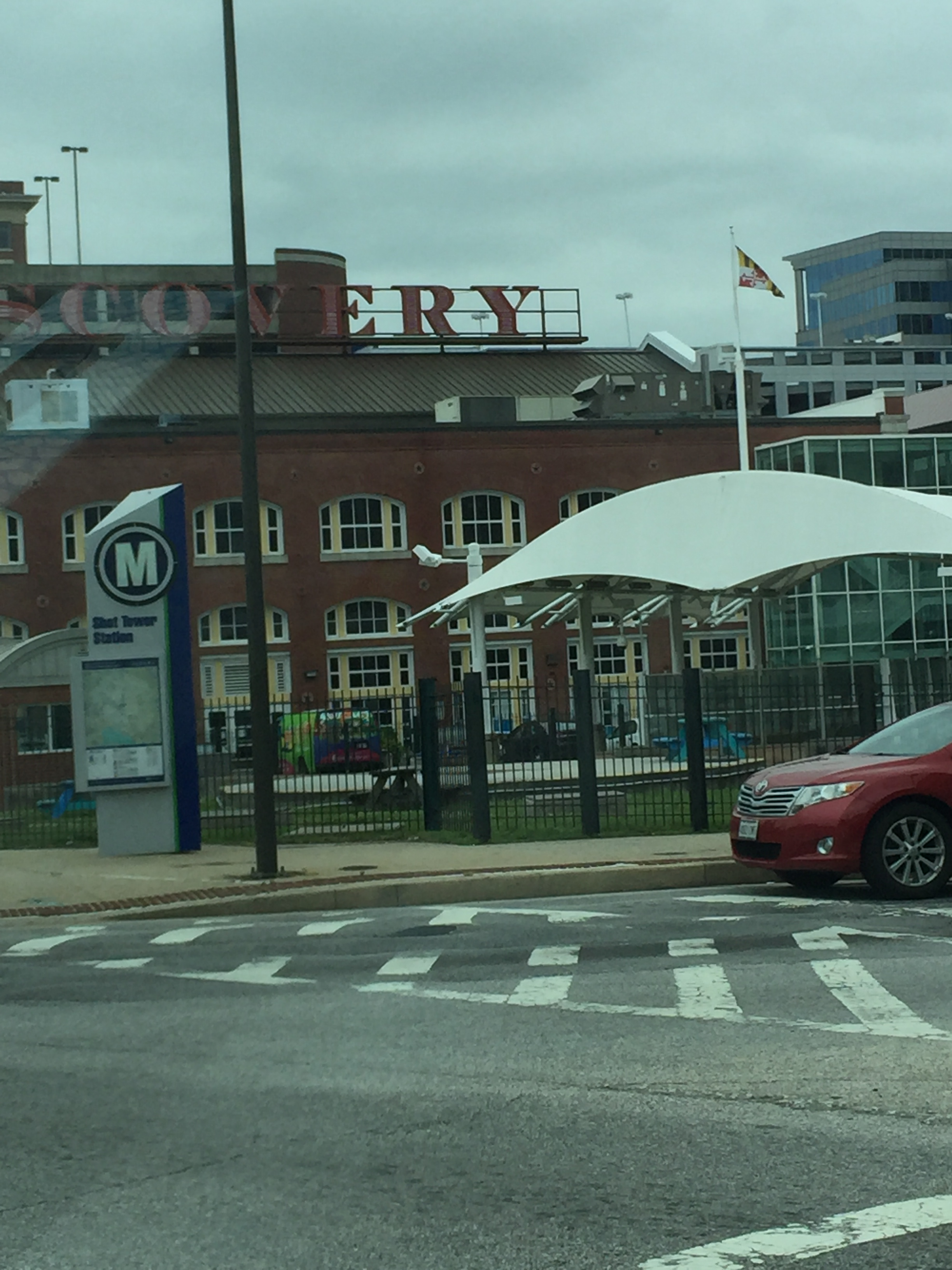
The west entrance to the Shot Tower Metro SubwayLink station.

== Maryland MTA Bus Connections ==
- 7 to Mondawmin Metro Subway Station (WB)/ Canton (EB)
- 10 to Catonsville or Paradise (WB)/ Dundalk (EB)
- 11 to Towson (NB)/ Canton (SB)
- 20 to Security Square Mall or CMS (WB)/ C.C.B.C Dundalk (EB)
- 23 to Catonsville or Wildwood (WB)/ Fox Ridge (EB)
- 40 (QuickBus) to CMS (WB)/ Middle River (EB)
- Charm City Circulator Green Route via City Hall (SB); Johns Hopkins Hospital (NB)
- Charm City Circulator Orange Route via Hollins Market (WB); Broadway Market (EB)
