= Lexington Market station (Light RailLink) =

Light rail station in Baltimore, Maryland, US

Lexington Market
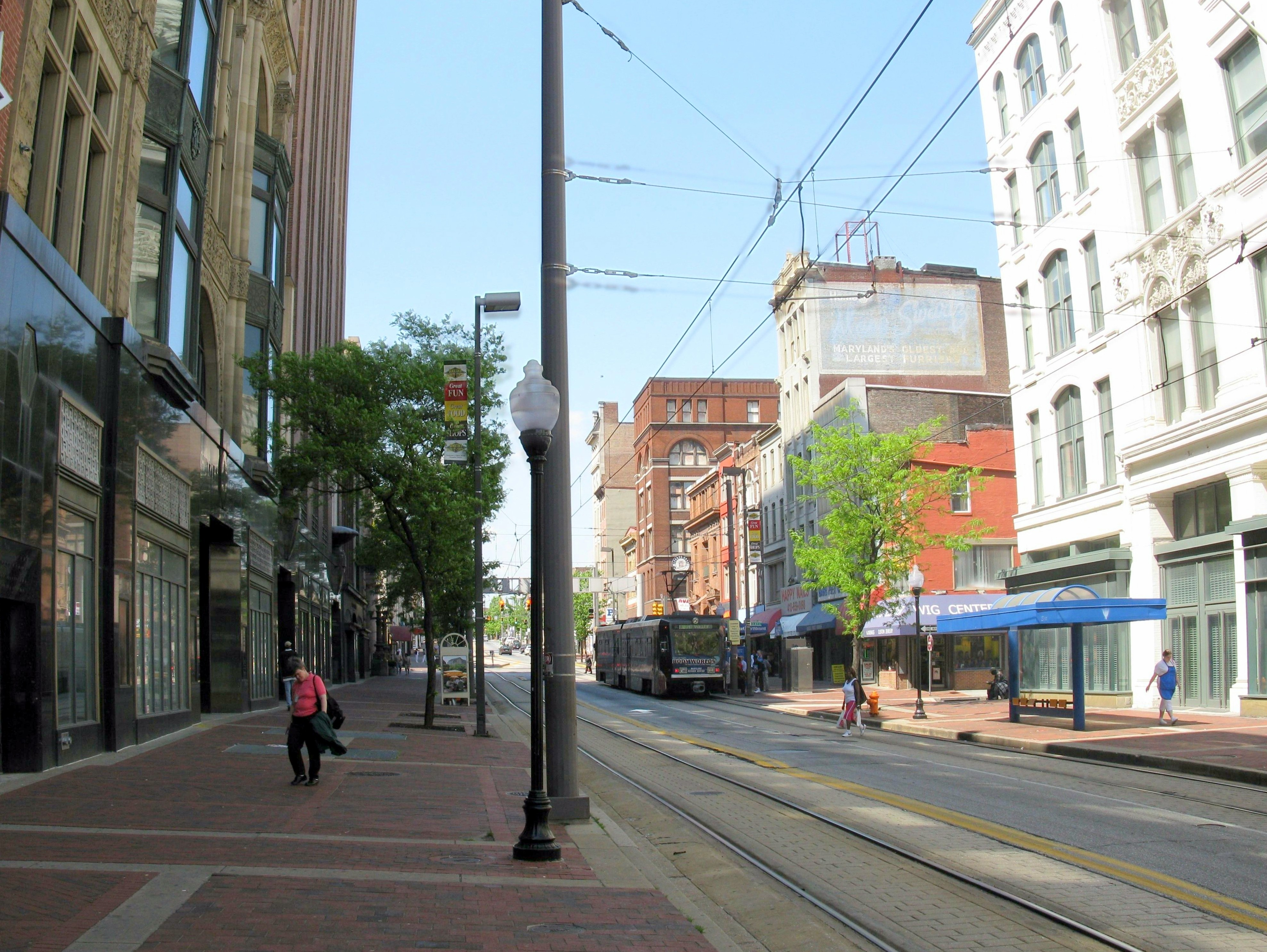
- Lexington Market station in May 2008

General information
- Location: North Howard Street at West Lexington Street; Baltimore, Maryland
- Coordinates: 39°17′32″N 76°37′10.6″W
- Owner: Maryland Transit Administration
- Platforms: 2 side platforms
- Tracks: 2
- Connections: Lexington Market station MTA Bus: 1, 5, 8, 15, 20, 23, 27, 36, 40, 47, 48, 91, 120, 150, 160

Construction
- Accessible: yes

History
- Opened: April 2, 1992

Passengers
- 2017: 3,047 daily (Light Rail)

Services
Preceding station	Maryland Transit Administration	Following station
Baltimore Arena toward BWI Airport or Glen Burnie	Light RailLink	Mt. Vernon toward Hunt Valley
Baltimore Arena toward Camden Yards	Light RailLink Penn–Camden Shuttle	Mt. Vernon toward Penn Station
Location

Lexington Market station is a Baltimore Light RailLink station adjacent to Lexington Market in Baltimore, Maryland. The station has two side platforms on the sidewalks of Howard Street. Lexington Market station on the Baltimore Metro SubwayLink is located one block to the west.
