= Charles Center station =

Metro SubwayLink station

Charles Center
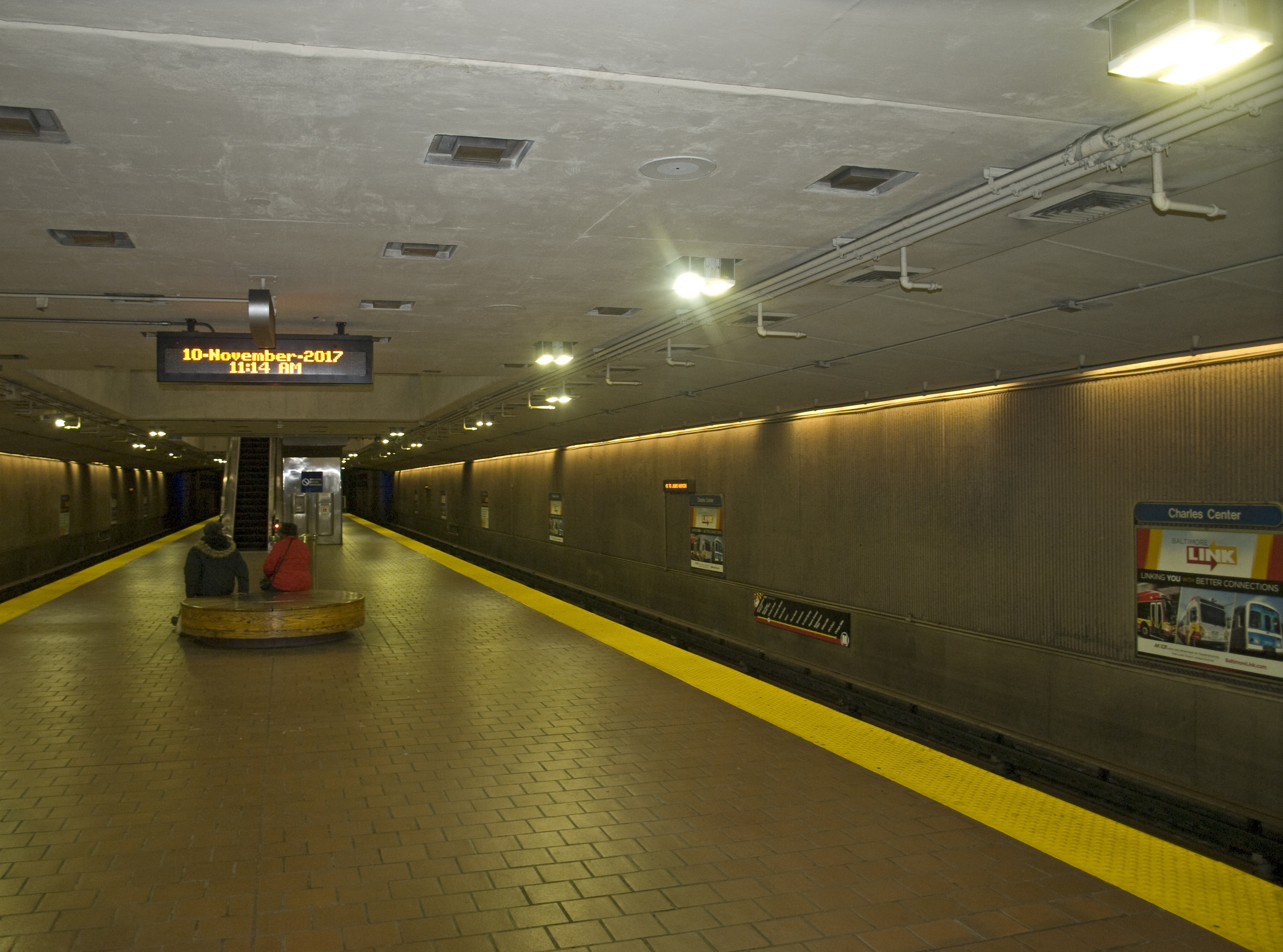

General information
- Location: Baltimore & Charles Streets; Baltimore, Maryland
- Coordinates: 39.28945°N 76.61582°W
- Owner: Maryland Transit Administration
- Platforms: 1
- Tracks: 2
- Connections: MTA Maryland Buses and Charm City Circulator

Construction
- Accessible: Yes

History
- Opened: November 21, 1983

Passengers
- 2017: 4,810 daily

Services
Preceding station	Maryland Transit Administration	Following station
Lexington Market toward Owings Mills	Metro SubwayLink	Shot Tower toward Johns Hopkins Hospital
Location

Charles Center station is an underground two-story Metro SubwayLink station in Baltimore, Maryland making it the largest station on the line. Located at the Charles Center in Downtown Baltimore, it is a downtown transportation hub serving many bus lines, nearby various landmarks, and bus transfers. It was the final stop of the line until 1995, when the extension to Johns Hopkins Hospital opened. The station is in close proximity to CFG Bank Arena as well as the Baltimore Arena station on the Light RailLink. The station has two street level entrances via escalators and elevators and is the center most station on the line serving Central Downtown Baltimore.

== History ==
Originally designated as the metro system's central hub, Charles Center was planned to have a stacked station design to allow for transferring between east–west and north–south lines.

== Bus Connections ==
- CityLink Navy - Mondawmin Metro or Watersedge / Dundalk
- CityLink Green - Downtown Baltimore / Towson Town Center
- CityLink Pink - Mondawmin (M) Station or Cedonia
- CityLink Red - University Maryland Transit Center or Lutherville (L) Station
- CityLink Purple - Catonsville / Paradise or City Hall
- 11 - Towson or Canton
- 20 - Security Square Mall or C.C.B.C. Dundalk / Marine Terminal
- 23 - Catonsville / Wildwood or Fox Ridge
- 30 - Edmondson Village or City Hall / Hopkins Bayview
- 35 - UMBC / Blind Industries or White Marsh
- 36 - Riverview or Northern Pkwy.
- QuickLink 40 - Westgate or Middle River
- 61 - Lake Avenue or Inner Harbor
- 64 - North Avenue or Curtis Bay / Energy Parkway / Riviera Beach
- 91 - Sinai Hospital or City Hall
- 120 (Express BusLink) - Johns Hopkins Hospital or White Marsh
- 150 (Express BusLink) - Harbor East or Columbia
- 160 (Express BusLink) - Johns Hopkins Hospital or Whispering Woods / Fox Ridge
- 310 (Commuter) - Johns Hopkins Hospital or Columbia)
- 410 (Commuter) - State Center (M) Station or Churchville / Belair
- 411 (Commuter) - Johns Hopkins Hospital (SB)/ Hickory or Belair (NB)
- 420 (Commuter) - Johns Hopkins Hospital or Havre de Grace
- Charm City Circulator Purple Route
