= Johns Hopkins Hospital station =

Metro SubwayLink station

Coordinates: 39°17′53.69″N 76°35′38.78″W

Johns Hopkins Hospital
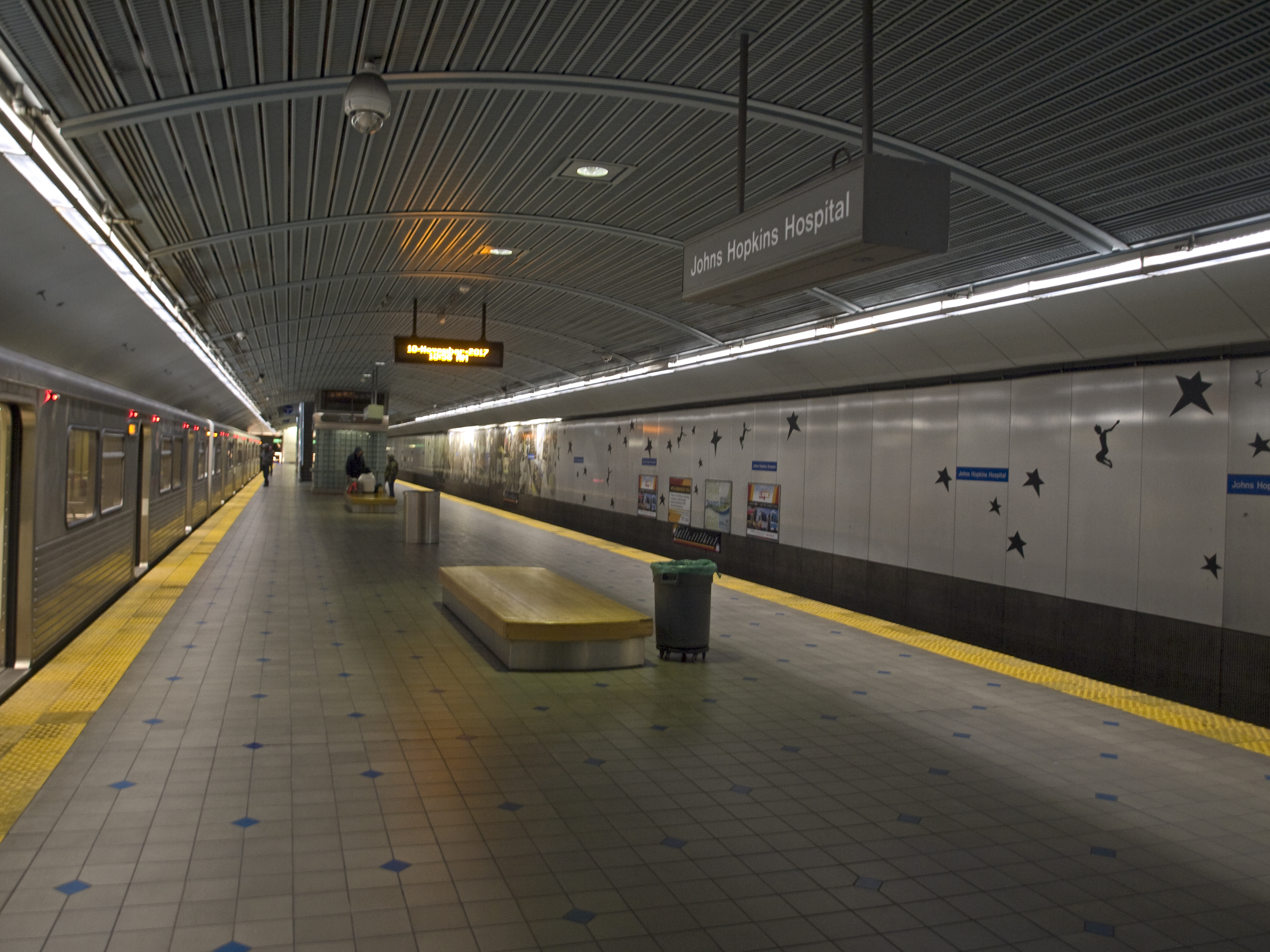
- Train platform for the Metro Subway's Johns Hopkins Hospital station.

General information
- Location: 702 North Broadway; Johns Hopkins Hospital; Baltimore, Maryland
- Owner: Maryland Transit Administration
- Platforms: 1 island platform
- Tracks: 2
- Connections: MTA Maryland Buses

Construction
- Accessible: Yes

History
- Opened: May 1995

Passengers
- 2017: 3,741 daily

Services
Preceding station	Maryland Transit Administration	Following station
Shot Tower toward Owings Mills	Metro SubwayLink	Terminus
Location

Johns Hopkins Hospital station is an underground Metro SubwayLink station in Baltimore, Maryland. It is located by Johns Hopkins Hospital, and is the final stop on the line.

The station is one of two stops in the third phase of the Baltimore Metro, having opened in 1995. The Johns Hopkins Hospital Metro Subway Station has two street-level entrances, and an entrance to the hospital that bypasses the street.

The station is the second largest in the Baltimore Metro system after Charles Center.

The station features "Lost in the Cosmos," a collage mural on porcelain on both walls of the subway platform designed by artist Peggy Fox. Fox won a commission from the MTA to create the art piece through an open competition in 1987, shortly after the start of work on the subway extension, and completed most of the production by 1992.

Interior shots of the 1997 Homicide: Life on the Street episode titled "Subway" were filmed here (exteriors were shot at the Shot Tower stop). The station signs were replaced with signs for a fictional "Inner Harbor" stop.
