= Cross Street Market =

Historic marketplace in Baltimore, Maryland, USA

Coordinates: 39°16′36.5″N 76°36′48″W

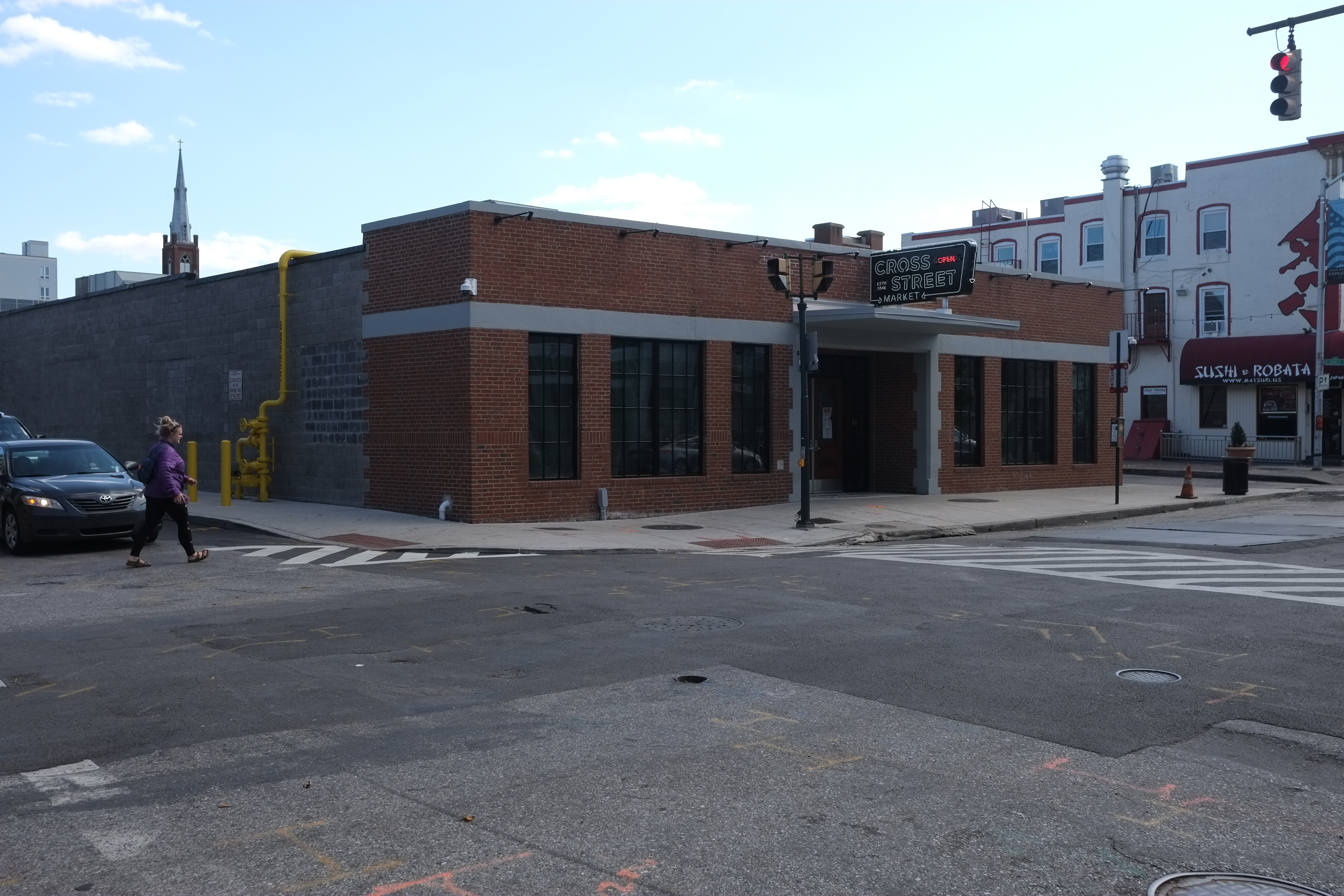
Cross Street Market

The Cross Street Market is a historic marketplace built in the 19th century in Federal Hill, Baltimore, United States. It runs the full length of Cross Street in between Light Street and Charles Street.

The market has undergone an $8.4 million redevelopment as of spring 2019. Stalls within the market were closed for renovations since fall of 2018.

== History ==
The market was the scene of the Cross Street Market Hall riot of September 8, 1876. As background, Baltimore's political landscape at the time was dominated by the notoriously corrupt Democratic-Conservative machine led by Senator Arthur Pue Gorman and city boss Isaac Freeman Rasin. This organization maintained power through cronyism, bribery, and election fraud, including stuffing ballot boxes and orchestrating repeat voting. The corruption of the Gorman-Rasin machine spurred the rise of a faction of "independent and reform-minded Democrats." These reformers actively opposed the party machine and sought to clean up city politics. During a political meeting of the reform party at Cross Street Market, shots were fired and people injured, including prominent attorney and political campaigner C. Irving Ditty. There was a notable court case over the incident.
