= Phoenix Shot Tower =

- Shot Tower
- U.S. National Register of Historic Places
- U.S. National Historic Landmark
- Baltimore City Landmark
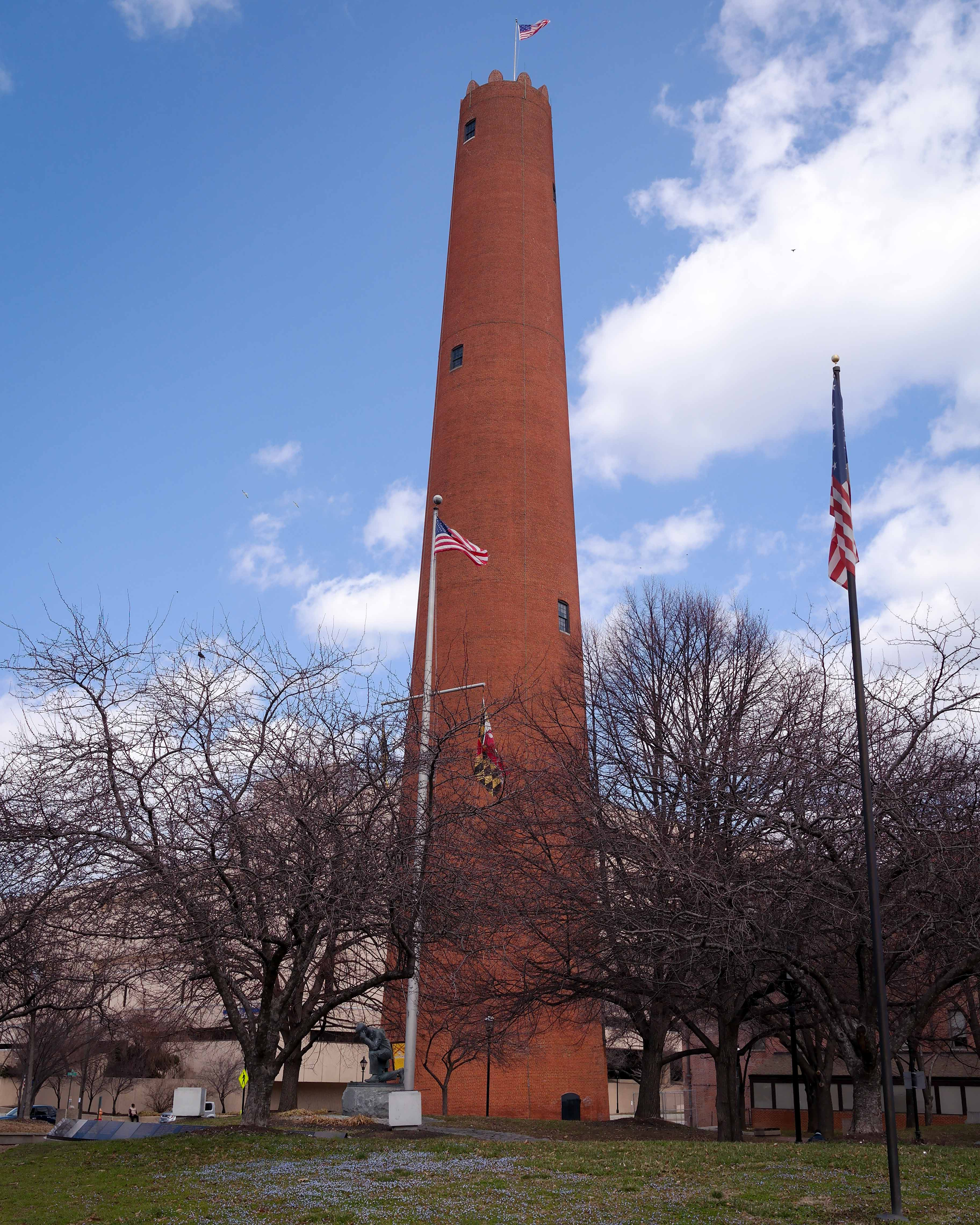
- Phoenix Shot Tower

- Location within Baltimore Location within Maryland Location within the United States
- Location: Baltimore, Maryland
- Coordinates: 39°17′26.6″N 76°36′19.7″W
- Built: 1828
- NRHP reference No.: 69000373

Significant dates
- Added to NRHP: October 1, 1969
- Designated NHL: November 11, 1971
- Designated BCL: 1975

The Phoenix Shot Tower, also known as the Old Baltimore Shot Tower, is a red brick shot tower, 234.25 feet (71.40 m) tall, located near the downtown, Jonestown (also known later as Old Town), and Little Italy communities of East Baltimore, in Maryland. The tower was built in less than 6 months. When it was completed in 1828 it was the tallest structure in the United States.

The tower was originally the "Phoenix Shot Tower", then the "Merchants' Shot Tower", and is also sometimes called the "Old Baltimore Shot Tower". It is the only surviving shot tower among four that existed in Baltimore. The structure was designated a National Historic Landmark on November 11, 1971, and as a local Baltimore City Landmark on October 14, 1975.

The Shot Tower lends its name to the nearby Shot Tower station on the Baltimore Metro subway line. The original basketball team Baltimore Bullets was named in honor of the tower's role in producing shot, as was the team that became the Washington Wizards.

== Design ==
The tower was built by Jacob Wolfe using bricks manufactured by the Burns and Russell Company of Baltimore. Charles Carroll of Carrollton, a Roman Catholic lay leader, wealthiest man in America at that time and the only surviving signer of the Declaration of Independence, laid its cornerstone on July 4, 1828. Charles Carroll's winter house was a block south of the tower. The tower was completed the same year.

The circular brick structure's walls are 4.5 feet (1.4 m) thick from the bottom to about 50 feet (15 m) up; then they narrow in stages of 4 inches (10 cm) each, until reaching a thickness of 21 inches (53 cm) at the top. The tower was constructed from roughly 1.1 million bricks. The tower was constructed without scaffolding because the masons who worked on the tower worked from the interior instead of the exterior.

The top of the tower is crenellated while the bottom of the tower has heavy metal doors. Additionally the tower has windows randomly placed along its side to help light the staircase.

== Production ==
The method of making lead shot was created by William Watts and is named as the Watts Method. This process was deemed more efficient than pouring lead into molds. Molten lead was dropped from a platform at the top of the tower, through a sieve-like device, into a vat of cold water at the bottom of the tower to produce "drop shot" for muskets. When hardened, dried, and polished, the shot was sorted into 25-pound bags. The tower could produce 1,000,000 of these 25-pound bags per year but could double this if necessary, making it one of the largest shot producers in the country. Shot produced was typically used for activities such as small game hunting. The size of mold shot the tower made were:

No.: 16,37,55,1C, AP, NP, 000, 00, 0, 1, 2, 3. (For Colt's Army Navy Pistol and Buck Shot)

For drop shot the tower made: TTT, TT, T, BBB, BB, B, 1, 2, 3, 4, 5, 6, 7, 8, 9, 10, 11, 12, 13, and 14.

The tower stopped producing shot in 1892, when the new Wind Tower Method, rendered the Watts Method obsolete. It re-opened for a brief period of production at the beginning of the twentieth century, then closed for good.

== History ==
The Phoenix Tower directors were James Hooper Jr. of James Hooper and Sons, George N. Eaton of Eaton Bros and Co., George WM Brown, late Mayor of Baltimore, Francis A. Crook, Treasurer of Baltimore Equitable Society, William Wilson Jr. of Wilson, Burns and Co., George W. Corner, of James Corner and Sons. The president of the tower was Henry D. Harvey and the secretary was Lucien O’Connor. The tower remained the tallest structure in the United States until 1846, when Trinity Church, New York on Wall Street was erected, and the tallest in Baltimore until the completion of the spire of the First Presbyterian Church at West Madison Street and Park Avenue in the Mount Vernon-Belvedere neighborhood in 1875.

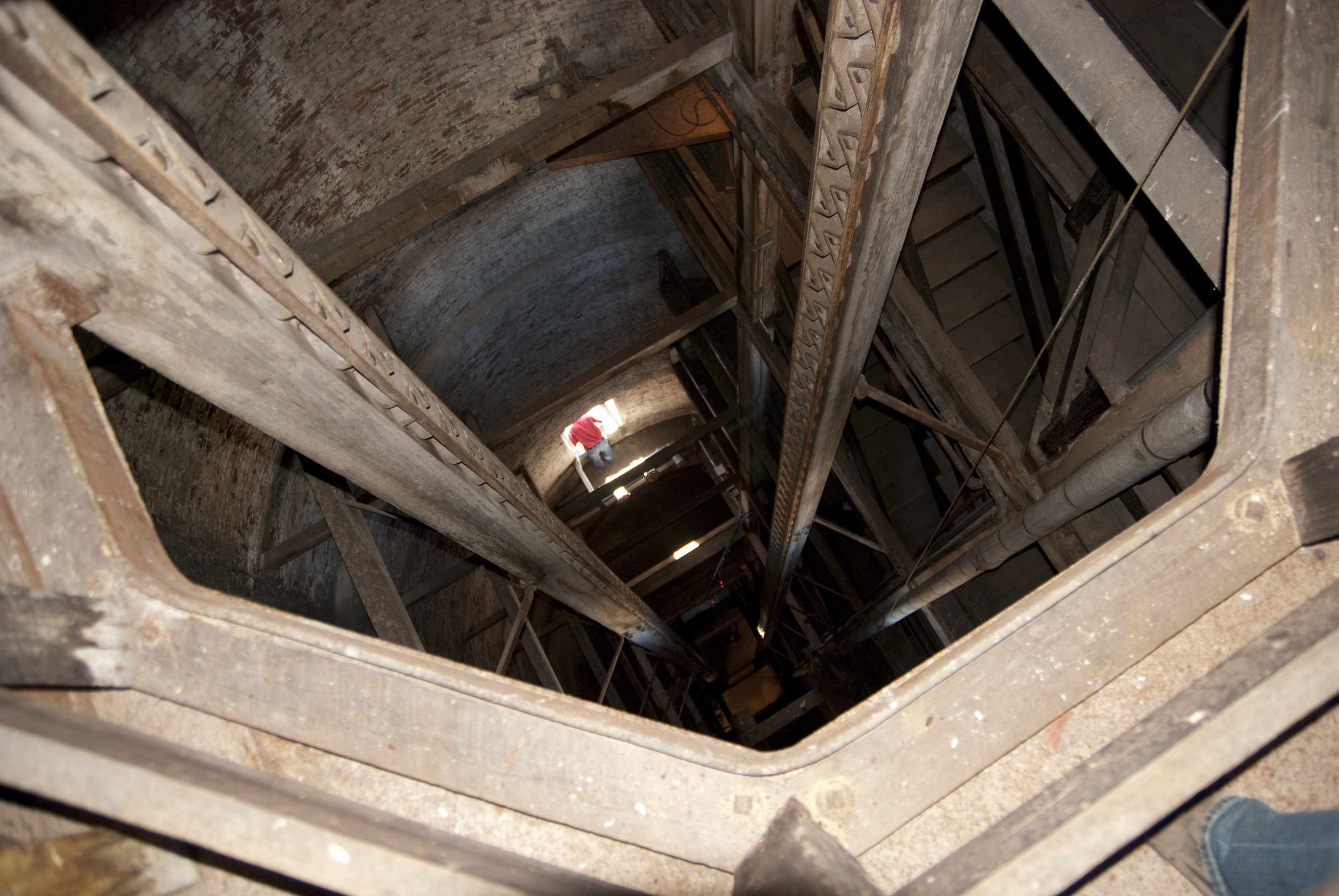
Interior of the tower, looking down

In 1882 the interior of the tower was destroyed by a fire that could be seen for miles, as flames shot 300 feet into the air, but it was quickly rebuilt and put back into production. This can be seen by the change of color among the brick towards the top of the tower. There is no evidence as to what caused the fire. There were no deaths in the tower during its time of production. There was one accident where two men were hauling lead to the top of the tower when a cable slipped and fell to the ground, but they survived with minimal injuries.

The shot tower was originally owned by the Merchants' Shot Tower Company, which closed in 1898.

In 1921 the tower was purchased for $14,500 by the Union Oil Company, which planned to tear it down and put a gas station in its place. After strong objections by the community, money was raised to purchase the tower and present it to the City of Baltimore in 1928 as one of its first preserved local historic landmarks. The city had paid roughly between $17,000 and $22,000 in order to save the shot tower.

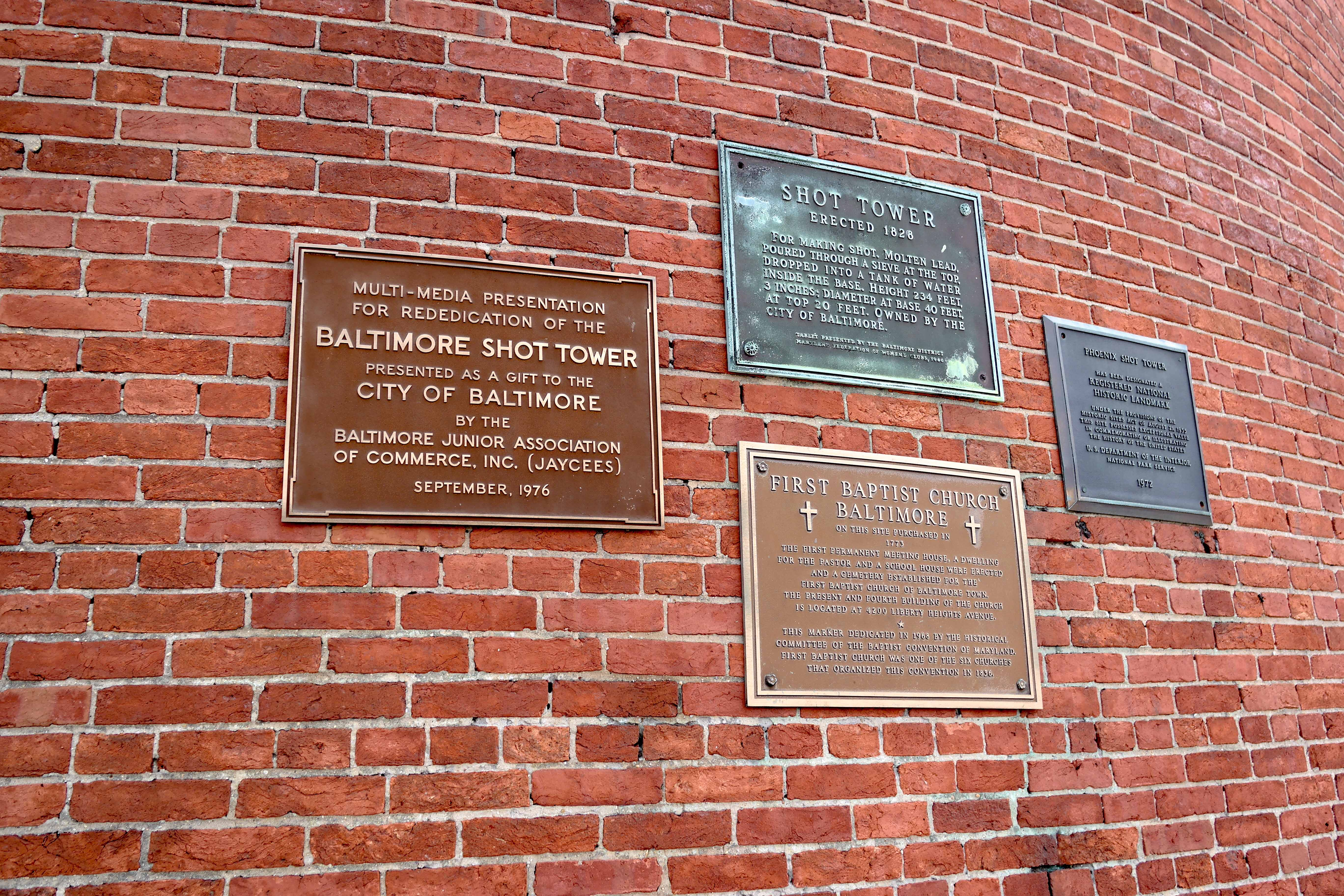
Plaques at the Phoenix Shot Tower, formerly the Merchants Shot Tower, in Baltimore's Jonestown neighborhood

The tower was nominated by architect W. Brown Morton III for the National Register of Historic places in July 1969. It was added to the register on September 20, 1969. The tower was designated a National Historic Landmark in 1971 and a bronze plaque was attached to its brick wall at the base. By 1976 the tower was restored and turned into a museum though over time the tower would need further restoration. In the early 1980s, the management, exhibits, and tours were combined with those of the former Peale Museum. In 1982 the tower was rehabilitated. In 1985, other historic sites and homes were added to the newly created Baltimore City Life Museums system. The BCLM was closed in 1997, and in 2002 Carroll Museums Inc. was created to manage both the Carroll Mansion and the Shot Tower.

As of 2021, the Phoenix Shot Tower had been inspected by Johnson, Mirmiran and Thompson (JMT) to evaluate the structural integrity of its brick masonry as well as the timber walkways, stars rails, and for minor electrical upgrades for lighting. According to JMT the building was then owned by the city of Baltimore and managed by the National Park Service. After the inspection the tower received a restoration and rehabilitation to make it accessible to the public once again. The Plano Coudon Construction group added a new electrical system, new lighting on each level, redid support beams, and put in new metal railings that are fixed to the landing. Additionally they added in metal grates to cover exposed areas. They also added safety features for the climb from the 14th level to the roof of the tower. These additions included higher metal railings, wire mesh, and trusses. Lastly they reinforced the railings on the roof and added lighting protection. The tower is open to the public on the weekends during the summer from 10AM to 12pm.
