= Charm City Circulator =

Downtown shuttle service in Baltimore, Maryland

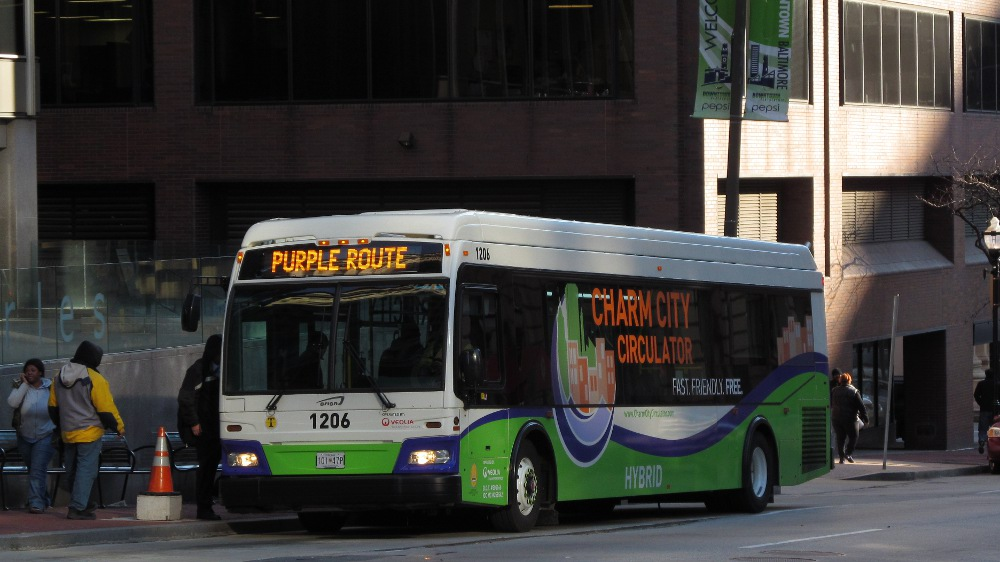
- A 2011-model OBI Orion VII 07.501 EPA10 HEV "BRT"
- Parent: Baltimore City Department of Transportation
- Commenced operation: January 11, 2010
- Locale: Baltimore, Maryland
- Service area: Downtown Baltimore
- Service type: Downtown circulator bus service
- Routes: Bus: 5 Water Taxi: 3
- Stops: Bus: 101; Water Taxi: 3
- Fleet: 26; See fleet roster below
- Fuel type: Clean diesel, Hybrid
- Website: Official website

The Charm City Circulator (or Baltimore Circulator) is a public transit downtown circulator shuttle service giving riders connection to historic sites, parking, and businesses throughout downtown Baltimore for free. The newest transit system in Maryland was established in 2008, but did not begin inaugural service until January 11, 2010, because of funding issues. The system operates five routes on major streets throughout downtown. The system also connects to the city's water taxi and MTA Maryland.

== History ==
The Charm City Circulator started as a plan by former mayor Sheila Dixon to make Baltimore an eco-friendly city and utilize transport throughout Downtown without the patron spending a dime. The plan was to launch three routes connecting across the inner-city, but delays in bus delivery caused routes to be implemented over 18 months rather than all at once. Service is seven days-a-week, with ten-minute intervals between buses. On January 11, 2010; the Orange Route became the pilot service for the Charm City Circulator traveling east-west via Pratt Street/Lombard Street, Central Avenue, and Baltimore Street. As soon as three months after service of the first line begin, the "CCC" reached the 100,000 riders milestone. Nearly six months later on June 4, the Purple Route began service traveling north-south via Charles Street & St. Paul/Light Streets. The much anticipated Green Route recently began service just outside downtown connecting City Hall to Johns Hopkins Medical Center via Broadway, Fleet Street, and President Street. On August 15, 2011, the city of Baltimore received $1.6 million in federal funds to expand service to Fort McHenry in early 2012. The "Banner Route" or Blue Route was intended to relieve congestion and make it easier for visitors to get to/from the famous landmark in time for the War of 1812 bicentennial celebration.

== Bus routes ==
| Route | Numbered stops | Major streets | Tourist connection | MTA connection | Began service |
|---|---|---|---|---|---|
| Green: Johns Hopkins to City Hall via Fells Point | 101–126 | Broadway; Fleet Street | Baltimore Juvenile Detention Center; City Hall; Baltimore City Police HQ; Port Discovery; Reginald F. Lewis Museum of Maryland African American History & Culture; Harbor East; Maritime Park; Broadway Market; Fells Point; Washington Hill; Johns Hopkins Hospital | Rail: Metro; Bus: Gold, Pink, Blue, Orange, Navy, Brown, Yellow, 40, 54, 56, 65, 105, 120, 154 | November 1, 2011 |
| Orange: Harbor East to Hollins Market | 201–228 | Pratt/Lombard Streets; Baltimore Street | Hollins Market; B&O Railroad Museum; UMB BioPark; Veterans Affairs Medical Center; Camden Yards; Convention Center; The Gallery/Harborplace; National Aquarium in Baltimore; Harbor East; Little Italy; Jewish Museum of Maryland; Holocaust Memorial; Fallon Federal Building; Royal Farms Arena | Rail: Light Rail, Metro, MARC Camden Line; Bus: Navy, Lime, Brown, Yellow, Purple, Orange, Lime, 40, 51, 56, 65, 67, 69, 71, 73, 78, 94, 95, 103, 105, 115, 120, 150, 154, 160 | January 11, 2010 |
| Purple: Federal Hill to 33rd Street via Penn Station | 301–327 | Charles Street; St. Paul/Light Streets | Federal Hill; Cross Street Market; Maryland Science Center; The Gallery/Harborplace; Mercy Medical Center; Washington Monument; Mount Vernon; Baltimore Penn Station; Spotlighters Theatre; Peabody Institute; Preston Gardens; Mitchell Courthouse; Charles Center | Rail: Light Rail, Metro, MARC Penn Line; Bus: Brown, Navy, Yellow, Silver, Green, Lime, Pink, Blue, Orange, Red, Purple, 21, 22, 40, 51, 52, 53, 56, 65, 67, 71, 78, 80, 91, 94, 95, 103, 105, 115, 120, 150, 154, 160 | June 4, 2010 (33rd Street Expansion October 5, 2015) |
| Banner: Inner Harbor to Fort McHenry | 401–420 | Charles Street; Light Street; Key Highway; Fort Avenue | Fort McHenry; Museum of Industry; Visionary Arts Museum; Maryland Science Center; Baltimore Visitors Center | Bus: Navy, Brown, Silver, Green, Yellow, 51, 54, 71, 76, 91, 94, 95, 154 | June 4, 2012 |
| Cherry: Inner Harbor to Cherry Hill | | Charles Street; Light Street; Fort Avenue; Cromwell Street; Cherry Hill Road | MedStar Harbor Hospital; Middle Branch Park; Port Covington; McHenry Row; Riverside Park; Federal Hill; Cross Street Market; Maryland Science Center; Baltimore Visitors Center | Rail: Light Rail; Bus: Navy, Brown, Silver, Green, Yellow, 26, 51, 54, 69, 70, 71, 76, 91, 94, 95, 154 | June 23, 2024 |

== Water taxi harbor connector routes ==
| Destinations | Bus connection | Frequency | Year begin |
|---|---|---|---|
| Maritime Park to Tide Point; Canton Waterfront Park to Tide Point | CCC: Green; MTA: 13 | Maritime Park to Tide Point; 15 minutes; Canton Waterfront Park to Tide Point; 30 minutes | 2011 |
| Harbor East to Harbor View | CCC: Banner, Green | Harbor East to Harbor View; TBD | 2012 (TBD) |

== Bus fleet roster ==
| Year | Photo | Manufacturer | Model | Length | Fuel or propulsion | Powertrain | | Fleet series (qty.) | Notes |
Active Roster
| 2011-12 | | OBI | Orion VII 07.501 EPA10 HEV "BRT" | 40 feet (12 m) | Diesel-electric hybrid | Cummins ISB6.7 | BAE | 1201–1212 (12) | Arrived November 2011; Replaced 0901-0913; 1209-1212 wrapped in "Banner Route" decals; 1204 & 1206 Retired |
| 2019-21 | | Nova Bus | LFS TL40102A | 40 feet (12 m) | Diesel | Cummins L9 | Allison B3400xFE | 1910218-1910223, 1910234-1910239(12) | 6 buses from NovaBus entering into service as of February 2020.; 6 additional buses from NovaBus to enter service in Fall 2020. |
| 2025 | | Gillig | Low Floor | | Diesel | Cummins L9 | Allison | ?? | |
Retired Roster
| 2009 | | DesignLine | ECOSaver IV | 30 feet (9.1 m) | Hybrid | Capstone C30 | BRI AC motor | 0901–0913 (13) | Retired in spring 2012 due to reliability issues |
| 2011 | | Van Hool | A300L | 40 feet (12 m) | Diesel | Cummins ISL9 | Voith D864.5 | 1101–1105 (5) | Bus #1105 has three doors; Engine compartment placed in left-center of vehicle; As of 2020, all Van Hool buses are retired. |
| 2012 | | Van Hool | A300L | 40 feet (12 m) | Diesel | Cummins ISL9 | Voith D864.5 | 1106 (1) | Purchased as a Second-Hand unit in 2019. Retired in 2020. |

- All current and future buses in fleet are hybrid or clean-diesel vehicles under the Cleaner, Greener Baltimore Initiative's plan.
- Charm City Circulator (formerly operated by Veolia) bus yard located at 1400 Cherry Hill Road. Two blocks from Cherry Hill Light Rail Stop and connection to MTA bus routes 27, 29, and 51.
- As of February 2020, the Charm City Circulator is putting new buses into service manufactured by NovaBus, according to the Baltimore Sun, the City of Baltimore plans to order new buses to fully replace the Orion buses that was put into service in 2012.
