= Southern Maryland Rapid Transit =

Railway line in the United States of America

- Logo of the proposed line.

Overview
- Status: Proposed
- Locale: Prince George's County; Charles County
- Termini: White Plains (South); Branch Avenue (North)
- Stations: 12

Service
- Type: Bus rapid transit or Light rail
- System: Maryland Transit Administration
- Services: 1
- Operator(s): Maryland Transit Administration

Technical
- Line length: 18.7 mi (30.1 km)

Southern Maryland Rapid Transit, abbreviated as SMRT, is a proposed mass transit line along the Maryland Route 5 and U.S. Route 301 highway corridors in between Washington, D.C., and Waldorf, Maryland. The project would link the heavily populated suburbs of northwestern Southern Maryland with Washington via a direct transit connection to the Washington Metro at Branch Avenue station.

== Background ==
Plans have called for a mass transit line serving the MD 5-US 301 corridor since the 1990s. In 2004, the MD 5/US 301 Transit Service Staging Plan (TSSP) was created as a guide to mitigate transit expansion along the growing corridor. The Maryland State Senate issued Senate Bill 281 which required a light rail study be issued between Branch Avenue Metro Station and White Plains. This legislation was complemented by the 2010 Southern Maryland Corridor Transit Corridor Preservation Study, further detailing the planning process for such a transit connection. In May 2017, the SMRT Final Alternatives Report was released, recommending bus rapid transit and preferred alignment options. Local politicians are attempting to implement light rail over bus rapid transit, citing capacity concerns.

The 5.9 mile portion in Charles County (out of the total 18.7 mile preferred plan) would follow existing track parallel to U.S. Highway 301. The Prince George's County portion would connect with the existing Branch Avenue metrorail station. There would be 13 stops along the way, including at Joint Base Andrews and Medstar Southern Maryland Hospital Center. Planners have begun setting the stage for transit-oriented development, much of it centered around downtown Waldorf and the Brandywine Crossing shopping center. A map of the preferred plan is linked in footnote #6 below. The transit proposal has been studied a total of five times between 1996 and 2017. In 1997 it ranked third out of 73 projects statewide, but was vetoed in 2017 by Governor Hogan, who used different ranking criteria which made SMRT fall to 36th out of 38 projects in the state. The Prince George's County Council unanimously supported a 2020 bill to dedicate $27 million for a federal environmental review. In 2022 the Federal government awarded $5 million to match funds the state had committed toward completing the design, engineering, and environmental process of SMRT.

== See also ==
- Green Line – a proposed rail line in Baltimore from Johns Hopkins Hospital to Morgan State University.
- Red Line – a proposed rail line from Woodlawn, in Baltimore County (west), to Johns Hopkins Bayview Medical Center in Baltimore City (east).
- Charles Street Trolley – a proposed trolley line in northern Baltimore, backed by a non-MTA group.
