= SMRT =

SMRT may refer to:

== Medicine ==
- Silencing mediator for retinoid and thyroid-hormone receptor
- Single Molecule Real Time Sequencing, a parallelized DNA sequencing by synthesis technology

== Transport ==
- Santa Maria Regional Transit, a local bus system in California, USA
- Scenic Mississippi Regional Transit, a regional bus system in Wisconsin, USA
- Mass Rapid Transit (Singapore), a Mass Rapid Transit metro system in Singapore
- Southern Maryland Rapid Transit, a proposed American light-rail system

== Companies ==
- Seoul Metropolitan Rapid Transit Corporation, a South Korean subway operator
- SMRT Corporation, a Singaporean public transport operator
  - SMRT Trains, the rail subsidiary of said operator
  - SMRT Buses, the bus subsidiary

== Other uses ==
- St Mary Redcliffe and Temple School, a school located at Redcliffe, Bristol
- Thomas J. Smrt (born 1928), American inventor
- Homer Simpson's spelling of smart in The Simpsons episode "Homer Goes to College"
