= Yellow Line (Baltimore) =

Proposed mass transit line in Baltimore, Maryland

Overview
- Status: Proposed
- Locale: Baltimore, Maryland
- Termini: Columbia Town Center (South); Hunt Valley, Maryland (North)

Service
- Type: Bus rapid transit, light rail, or heavy rail
- System: Maryland Transit Administration
- Operator(s): Maryland Transit Administration

Technical
- Line length: 42 mi (67.6 km)

The Yellow Line is a mass transit line proposed by the Baltimore Regional Rail Plan in March 2002 for the Baltimore, Maryland area. It would begin at Columbia Town Center in Columbia, Maryland, and end in Hunt Valley, Maryland at Shawan Road.

== Original vision ==
As originally envisioned by the plan, the Yellow Line would conjoin with the existing Baltimore Light RailLink at BWI Business District station, and remain connected until Camden Yards station, where the two lines would spur to create a loop around Downtown Baltimore. In this small loop, the lines would both serve the Inner Harbor, Charles Center, Mt. Vernon stations, and Pennsylvania Station. At Penn Station, the Yellow Line would again split towards the north going through the neighborhoods of Station North, Charles Village, Waverly, Govanstown, Belvedere Square, and Towson. The Yellow Line would again meet up with the existing light rail line at Lutherville station. The lines would again conjoin until the northern terminus of Hunt Valley. Another station in the Yellow Line system was proposed for Texas, Maryland.

== Current status ==
The future for the Yellow Line proposal seems doubtful, as only two proposed rail lines were included in the "final" Baltimore Regional Rail System Plan: the Red Line and the Green Line. In the current Baltimore Regional Transit Map, yellow designates a branch from the existing Baltimore Light Rail line to the Cromwell Station in Glen Burnie, Maryland. The branches to Hunt Valley (north) and BWI Airport (south) are designated with the color blue.

In summer 2013, a representative of the privately funded TU Foundation expressed interest at a public meeting in the idea of a suggested partnership between the foundation and local companies to build a short piece of the line near Towson University. That small line, designated as the "Towson Trolley" was informally presented as only covering Towson-area destinations (including St. Joseph's Hospital, Towson University, downtown Towson and Lutherville Station, where it was pitched as terminating). Despite being presented as a short-line trolley, the plan as presented emphasized track compatibility in order to allow future expansion. As of 2014, however, no public-record mention of the plan appears to have occurred for more than a year.

== See also ==
- Green Line - a proposed rail line in Baltimore from Johns Hopkins Hospital to Morgan State University.
- Red Line - a proposed mass transit line from Woodlawn, in Baltimore County (west), to Johns Hopkins Bayview Medical Center in Baltimore City (east).
- Charles Street Trolley - a proposed trolley line in northern Baltimore, backed by a non-MTA group.
