= Charles Street Trolley =

Proposed streetcar line in Baltimore, Maryland

Overview
- Status: Proposed
- Locale: Baltimore, Maryland

Service
- Type: Streetcar

The Charles Street Trolley is a proposed streetcar line running through northern portions of Baltimore, Maryland, United States. Kittelson & Associates, Inc., a consulting firm hired by trolley advocates, estimates that the line would be likely to carry 2.5 million riders per year.

The proposal is backed by a public-private group known as the Charles Street Development Corporation. A second group, known as Friends of the Trolley is also backing the project; it was reported in November 2011 that FotT had hired a community organizer. As envisioned, the line would probably use modern, low-floor light rail cars, but the use of newly-built replica-vintage rail cars is an alternative also being considered.

A website for what appears to be a third group—the Baltimore Streetcar Campaign—is also active in advocating for a Charles Street trolley plan.

Certain portions of the proposed routing would be similar to that covered by the Maryland Transit Administration's proposed Yellow Line. As of 2012, the proposed alignment also overlaps significantly with a proposed extension of the Charm City Circulator.

While the proposed trolley is not a project of the MTA, the two groups have expressed a willingness to work together on certain elements of a transit plan for the area involved.

== See also ==
- Yellow Line - a proposed rail line in Baltimore that shares much of the Charles Street Trolley's route.
- Green Line – a proposed mass transit line in Baltimore from Johns Hopkins Hospital to Morgan State University.
- Red Line – a proposed mass transit line from Woodlawn, in Baltimore County (west), to Johns Hopkins Bayview Medical Center in Baltimore City (east).
- Streetcars in North America
