= Green Line (Baltimore) =

Proposed mass transit line in Baltimore, Maryland

Overview
- Status: Proposed
- Locale: Baltimore, Maryland
- Termini: Johns Hopkins Hospital; Morgan State University
- Stations: 13

Service
- Type: Bus rapid transit, light rail, or rapid transit
- System: Maryland Transit Administration; Metro SubwayLink
- Services: 1
- Operator(s): Maryland Transit Administration

Technical
- Line length: 4 mi (6.4 km)

The Green Line is a proposed mass transit line for the Baltimore, Maryland area in the United States. It is still in the planning stages and its construction is not guaranteed.

== Concept ==
In March 2002, the Baltimore Region Rail System Plan Advisory Committee, an independent commission appointed by Transportation Secretary John D. Porcari, developed suggestions for new lines and expansions of existing lines as part of a long-term regional rail system plan for the Baltimore area. The committee applied a unified branding scheme for the existing lines and the proposed new lines, identifying each line by a color, as the Washington Metro and many other transit agencies do. In the committee's report, the existing Baltimore Metro SubwayLink was renamed the Green Line, and was to be extended northeast of its current terminus at Johns Hopkins Hospital, past Morgan State University and Good Samaritan Hospital in the northeastern part of the city, and ultimately on to White Marsh in Baltimore County.

The proposed extension of the Metro SubwayLink was taken up by city and state officials as one of two proposals, from the advisory committee's long-term plan, that would be actively pursued (the other being the Red Line). Although the report used the name "Green Line" to refer to the entire expanded Metro SubwayLink, the term is currently being used to refer to the extension under consideration. As the existing Metro SubwayLink is currently marked in green on the Baltimore Regional Transit Map, it's possible that the term might someday refer to the entire line.

=== Extension from Hopkins to Morgan State University ===
The current Green Line study focuses only on the 4-mile section of the proposed line from Johns Hopkins Hospital to Morgan State University. While an extension of the existing Metro SubwayLink might seem like the most logical mode for this line, the expense of building several miles of underground heavy rail rapid transit might make the project untenable. Therefore, the ongoing scoping process is also considering bus rapid transit and light rail options as a possibility for this corridor.

=== Proposed stations ===
North to south, from Johns Hopkins Hospital station:

| Station Name | Parking | Connection |
|---|---|---|
| Madison Square | Parking | MARC Penn Line |
| East North Avenue | no | |
| Coldstream | Parking | |
| 33rd Street | Parking | |
| Northwood | Parking | |
| Morgan State University | Parking | |
Future Extension to White Marsh.
| Hamilton | no | |
| Northern Parkway | no | |
| Overlea | no | |
| Fullerton | Parking | |
| Perry Hall | Parking | |
| White Marsh | Parking | White Marsh Park & Ride |
| Martin State Airport | Parking | MARC Penn Line |

== Current status ==
Selection of a "locally preferred alternative" from the various transit options under consideration was originally scheduled for "Spring 2009 - Winter 2009." However, a selection was not announced during 2009 and the project schedule had still not been updated by the end of Summer 2010. As of October 2010, project planning for the Green Line is on hold for the foreseeable future. No funding was allocated for the line's planning as of fiscal year 2011.

== See also ==
- Red Line - a proposed mass transit line from Woodlawn, in Baltimore County (west), to Johns Hopkins Bayview Medical Center in Baltimore City (east).
- Yellow Line - a proposed rail line from Hunt Valley to Columbia Town Center.
- Charles Street Trolley - a proposed trolley line in northern Baltimore, backed by a non-MTA group.
