= Westside, Baltimore =

Westside Theater District, Garment District
- Neighborhood of Baltimore
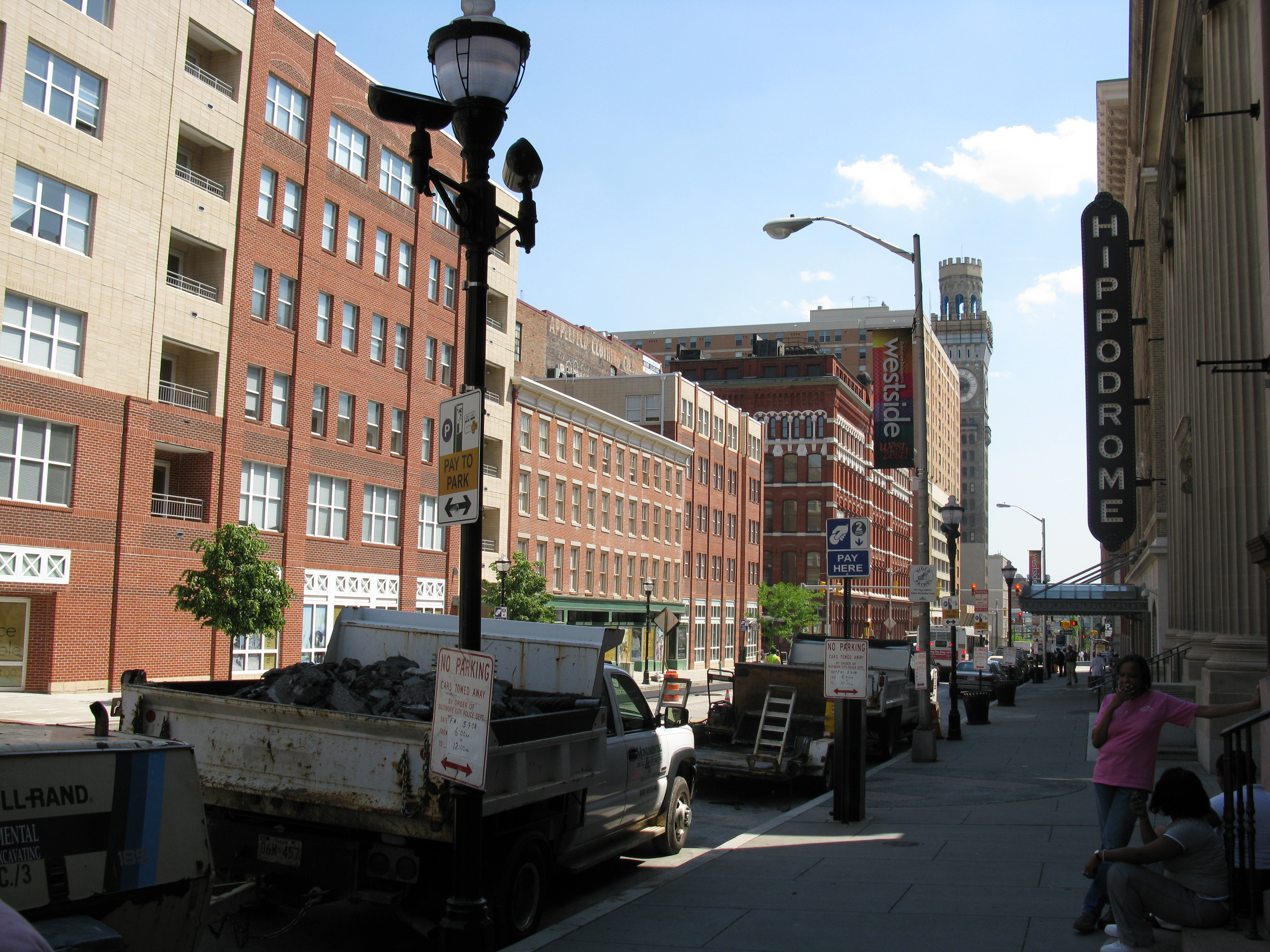
- Eutaw Street looking south on the Hippodrome Theater block.
- Interactive map of Westside
- Coordinates: 39°17′34″N 76°37′18″W
- Country: United States
- State: Maryland
- City: Baltimore
- District: Central

Westside Baltimore is the western portion of downtown Baltimore that includes Market Center and many of the newest developments in downtown Baltimore. It has increasingly become the preferred residential section of downtown. It is also home to the site of the "Superblock" project that will include hundreds of condos and apartments as well as a variety of retail and commercial space. The former home of Baltimore's many and famed department stores, Westside Baltimore is now anchored by the University of Maryland, Baltimore consisting of the University of Maryland Health System, University of Maryland School of Law and the University of Maryland Biopark. The Westside is also home to several performing arts centers, including the Hippodrome Theatre, Royal Farms Arena and the future home of the Everyman Theatre.

The name is sometimes used to describe West Baltimore as a whole, although it is technically incorrect to use it as such.

== Geography ==
Baltimore's Westside is located within the Downtown area of Central Baltimore. The Westside is generally bordered by Martin Luther King, Jr. Boulevard to the west, Mulberry Street to the north, Howard Street to the east, and Pratt Street to the south.

== History ==
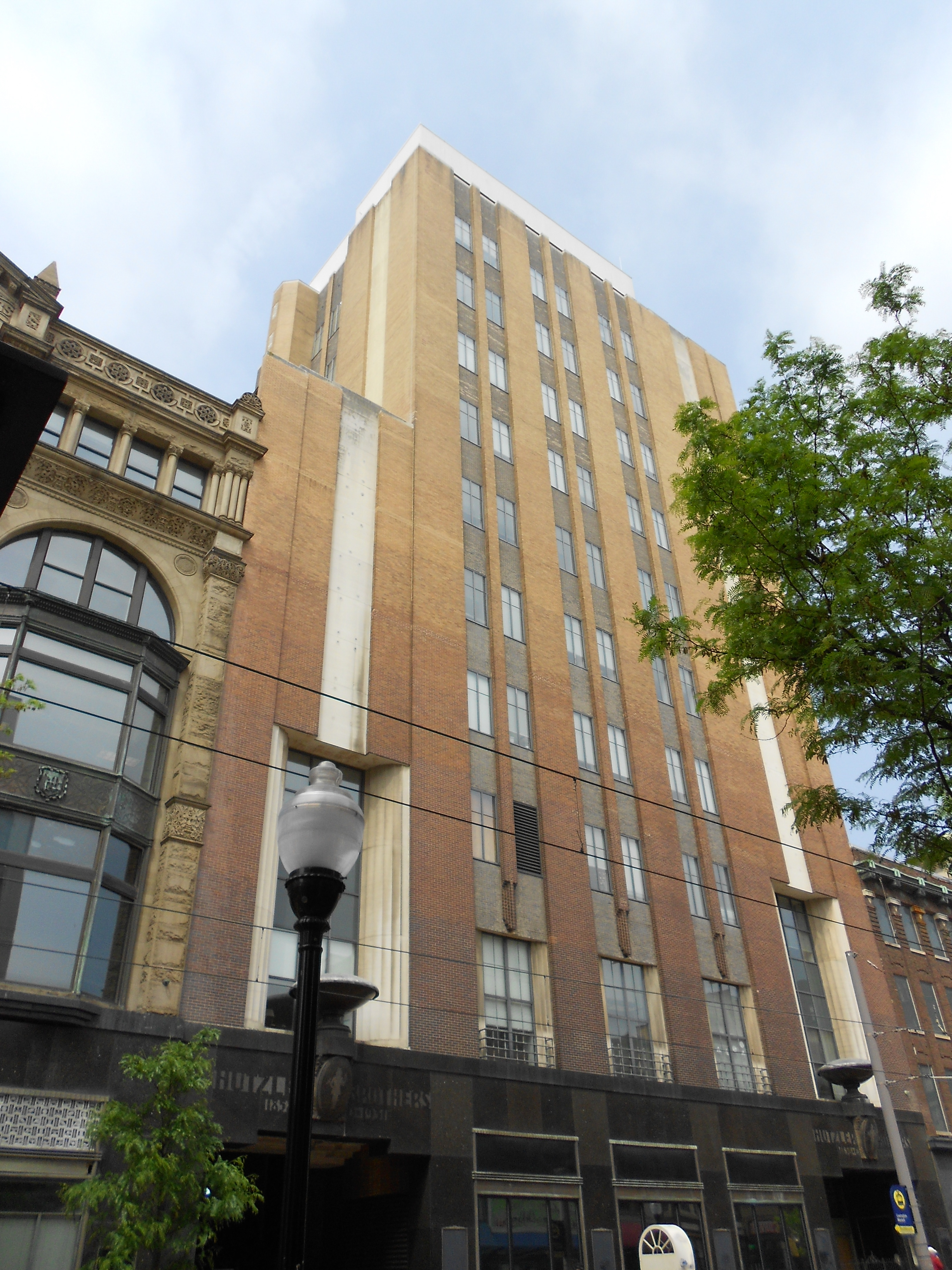
Former Hutzler's department store on Howard Street

The Westside of Downtown Baltimore has been an area of heavy economic development over the years. The Westside was known to be the "Garment District" for the many clothing factories placed throughout the neighborhood. This name continued to have relevance up until the mid twentieth century due to the abundance of department stores throughout the Howard Street corridor. Some of these include, Hutzler's, Stewart's, Hecht's, and Hochschild Kohn's.

The Lexington Market is another commercial center that has made the Westside a cornerstone of Baltimore's shopping history.

== Neighborhood revitalization ==
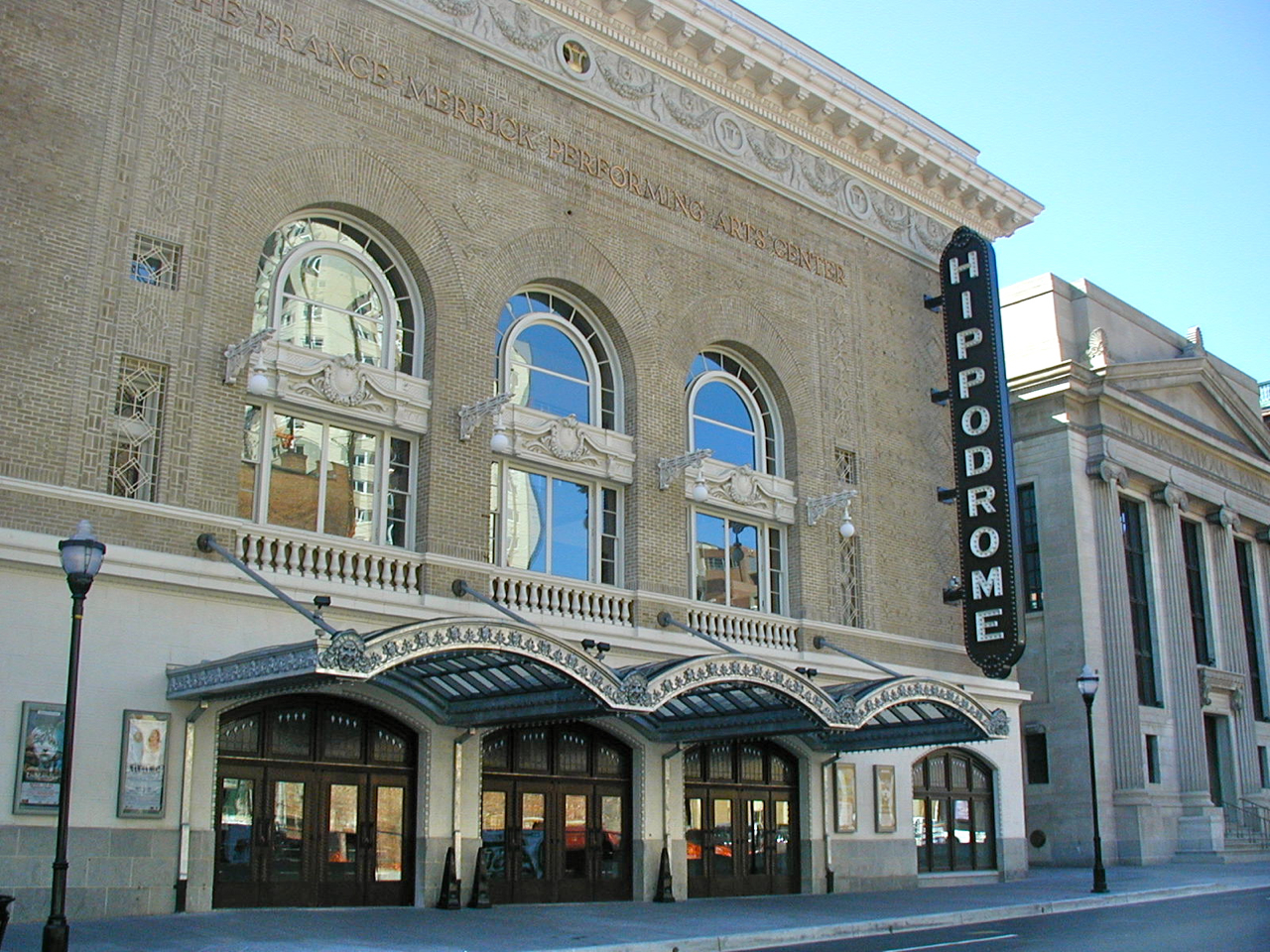
The Hippodrome Theater in 2004

During the late twentieth century, the Westside fell into decay due to the majority of shopping being relocated to the surrounding suburban malls. Numerous efforts have been made to revitalize Baltimore's Westside, including the Baltimore Light Rail running through the center of the neighborhood on Howard Street, and the restorations of Lexington Market, Hippodrome Theater, and the Everyman Theatre.

== Future ==
Baltimore's Westside is expected to see a rise in development and revitalization due to the construction of the Red Line subway running under the neighborhood from east to west. The Red Line will have two stations in Westside; Poppleton Station on the western edge serving the University of Maryland, Baltimore, and University Center/Howard Street serving the central part of the neighborhood. The University Center/Howard Street station will be a major transfer point for the existing north-south Blue Line on Howard Street.
