= Red Line (Baltimore) =

Proposed light rail line

Overview
- Status: Route selection
- Locale: Baltimore, Maryland
- Termini: Center for Medicare/Medicaid Services, Woodlawn, Baltimore County (West); Bayview MARC station (East)
- Stations: 20–23

Service
- Type: Light rail
- System: Maryland Transit Administration
- Operator: Maryland Transit Administration

Technical
- Track gauge: 4 ft 8 1/2 in (1,435 mm) standard gauge

The Red Line is a proposed light rail line for Baltimore, Maryland. The original project was granted federal approval to enter the preliminary engineering phase and the Maryland Transit Administration had spent roughly $300 million in planning, design and land acquisition, until Maryland Governor Larry Hogan declared his intent to not provide state funds for the project and shift state funding to roads in suburban areas. The original Red Line had been projected to cost roughly $1.6 billion, $900 million of which would have been guaranteed federal funding. Its construction had been estimated to begin in late 2015–early 2016, subject to funding, with a completion date set for late 2021–early 2022.

While campaigning for governor, Hogan characterized the project as a "boondoggle". Hogan's shift of state priorities to road funding resulted in the construction of several major projects near properties owned by his company, leading to allegations of corruption. The Red Line cancellation was briefly investigated by the United States Department of Transportation for being in possible violation of Title VI of the Civil Rights Act of 1964, since his decision shifted a large quantity of state money from predominantly Black and low-income neighborhoods into affluent and predominantly white areas, but the investigation was closed with no finding.

The project was classed as inactive; however, after several groups continued to campaign for its construction, governor Wes Moore, announced in June 2023 that the project had resumed. By that November, it was undergoing updated route evaluations and mode selection. Light rail was selected as the preferred mode in June 2024.

== Background ==
Red Line

Overview
- Status: Canceled by Governor Larry Hogan in June 2015
- Locale: Baltimore, Maryland
- Termini: Center for Medicare/Medicaid Services, Woodlawn, Baltimore County (West); Johns Hopkins Bayview Campus, Baltimore City (East)
- Stations: 19 (planned)

Service
- Type: Light rail
- System: Maryland Transit Administration
- Operator: Maryland Transit Administration
- Daily ridership: 54,000 (2030 projection)

History
- Planned opening: after 2026

Technical
- Line length: 14.1 mi (22.7 km)
- Track gauge: 4 ft 8 1/2 in (1,435 mm) standard gauge
- Electrification: 750 V DC overhead
- Operating speed: Average 18 mph

In 2001, then-Maryland Secretary of Transportation John Porcari appointed a 23-member independent commission, the Baltimore Region Rail System Plan Advisory Committee, to make suggestions for new rail lines and expansions of existing lines. The proposals used a unified branding scheme for the existing lines and the proposed new lines, identifying each line by a color, as the Washington Metro and many other transit agencies do.

The suggested system was composed of six color-coded lines with an overall length of 109 miles (175 km) and 122 stations, including Baltimore's existing Metro SubwayLink and Light RailLink systems. In the commission's report, the Red Line was an east–west line that would begin at the Social Security Administration offices in Woodlawn in Baltimore County, travel through West Baltimore with an intermodal stop at the West Baltimore MARC station, pass through downtown (where transfers to the existing Metro Subway and Light Rail lines would be possible), and pass through East Baltimore with stops in Fells Point, Canton, and Patterson Park. The Red Line was designated by the commission as the starting component for new work on the 6-line system.

Out of the commission's various proposals, the Red Line was taken up with the most enthusiasm by area officials. Progress was slowed by a debate between state Secretary of Transportation Robert Flanagan and the Baltimore City government and Congressional delegation over the mode of transportation; Flanagan favored a bus rapid transit (BRT) solution with separate right-of-way components like Boston's Silver Line, while the city officials favored a light rail or heavy rail line and insisted that both modes of rail transit be included in studies.

Heavy rail was dismissed by Flanagan as an alternative, due to an estimated cost of $2.2 billion to $2.6 billion. With ridership of Baltimore's existing Metro system at only 45,000 at the time of his appointment, he did not expect the Red Line to reach the 140,000 to 150,000 ridership level necessary to attract federal funding for heavy rail.

=== Red Line alternatives ===
Baltimore Rail Plan featuring the east–west Red Line

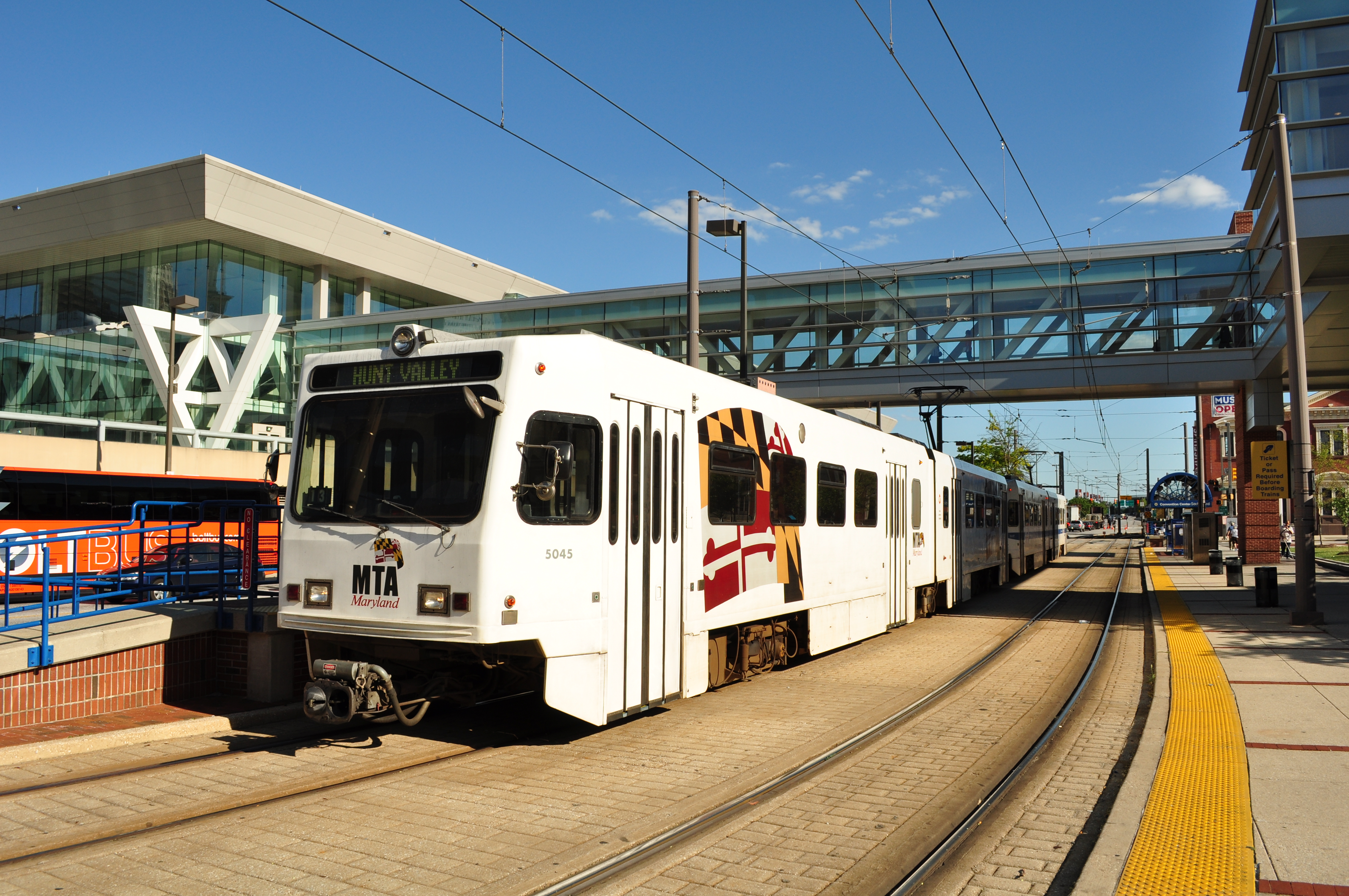
The Red Line would connect to the Light Rail at University Center.

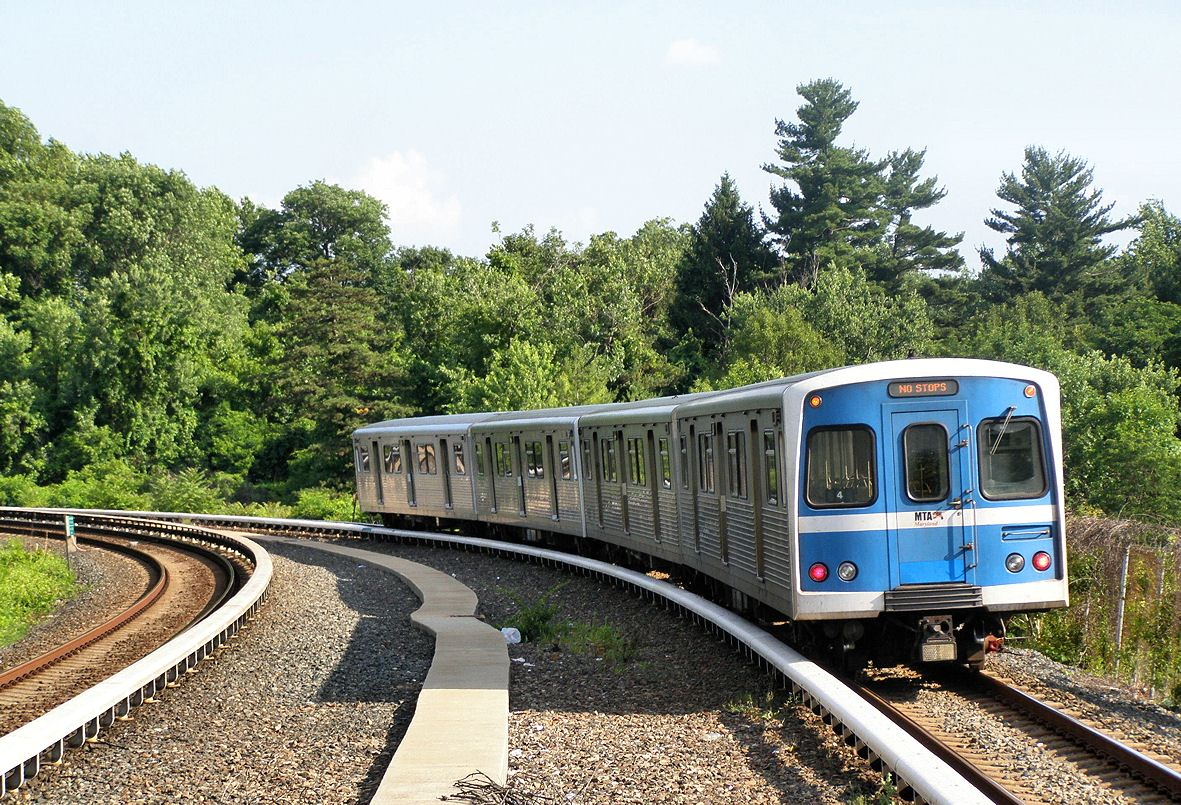
The Red Line would connect to the Metro Subway at Charles Center.

No.	Alternative	Length (miles)	Cost (millions) (2007 prices)	Travel time end to end (minutes)	Average Weekday Ridership
1	No Build	13.9	n/a	80	n/a
2	TSM	14.3	$281	76	17,600
3A	BRT, surface only	13.8	$545	62	31,400
3B	BRT, downtown tunnel	14.9	$1,019	56	37,400
3C	BRT, downtown tunnel, Cooks Lane tunnel	14.7	$1,151	53	37,400
3D	BRT, maximum tunnel	13.7	$2,404	43	41,500
3E	BRT, surface only, Johnnycake Rd. alignment	14.8	$571	69	29,300
3F	BRT, TSM surface, downtown tunnel	14.8	$755	65	34,300
4A	LRT, surface only	13.9	$930	55	34,600
4B	LRT, downtown tunnel	14.6	$1,498	43	41,100
4C	LRT, downtown tunnel, Cooks Lane tunnel	14.6	$1,631	41	42,100
4D	LRT, maximum tunnel	13.7	$2,463	36	42,300

- TSM: Transportation systems management (using the existing bus system, with modifications to signalling, lane assignments, and controls)
- BRT: Bus rapid transit
- LRT: Light rail transit

=== Modified alternative 4C selected by governor ===
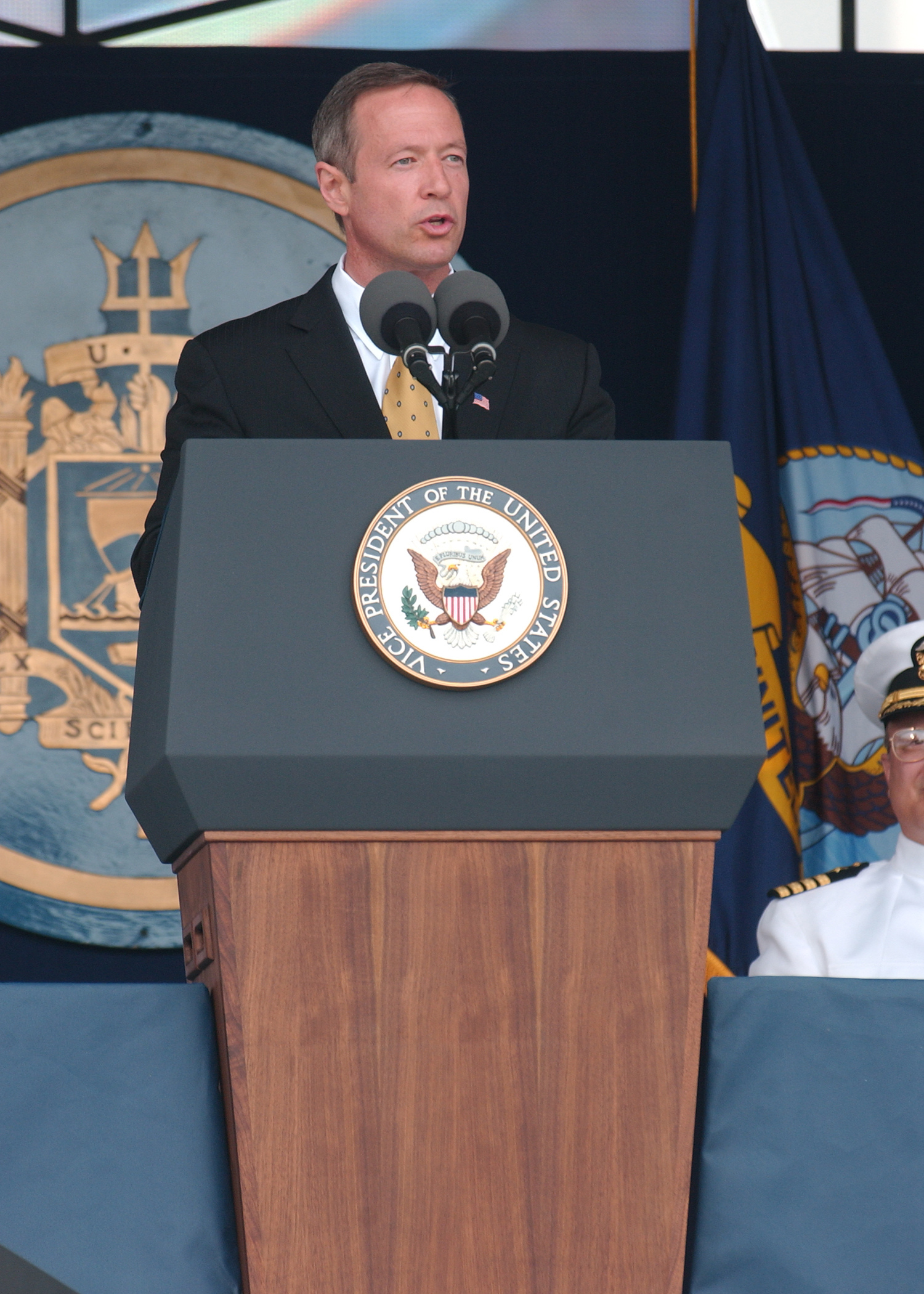
Governor O'Malley oversaw much of the Red Line's planning and engineering.

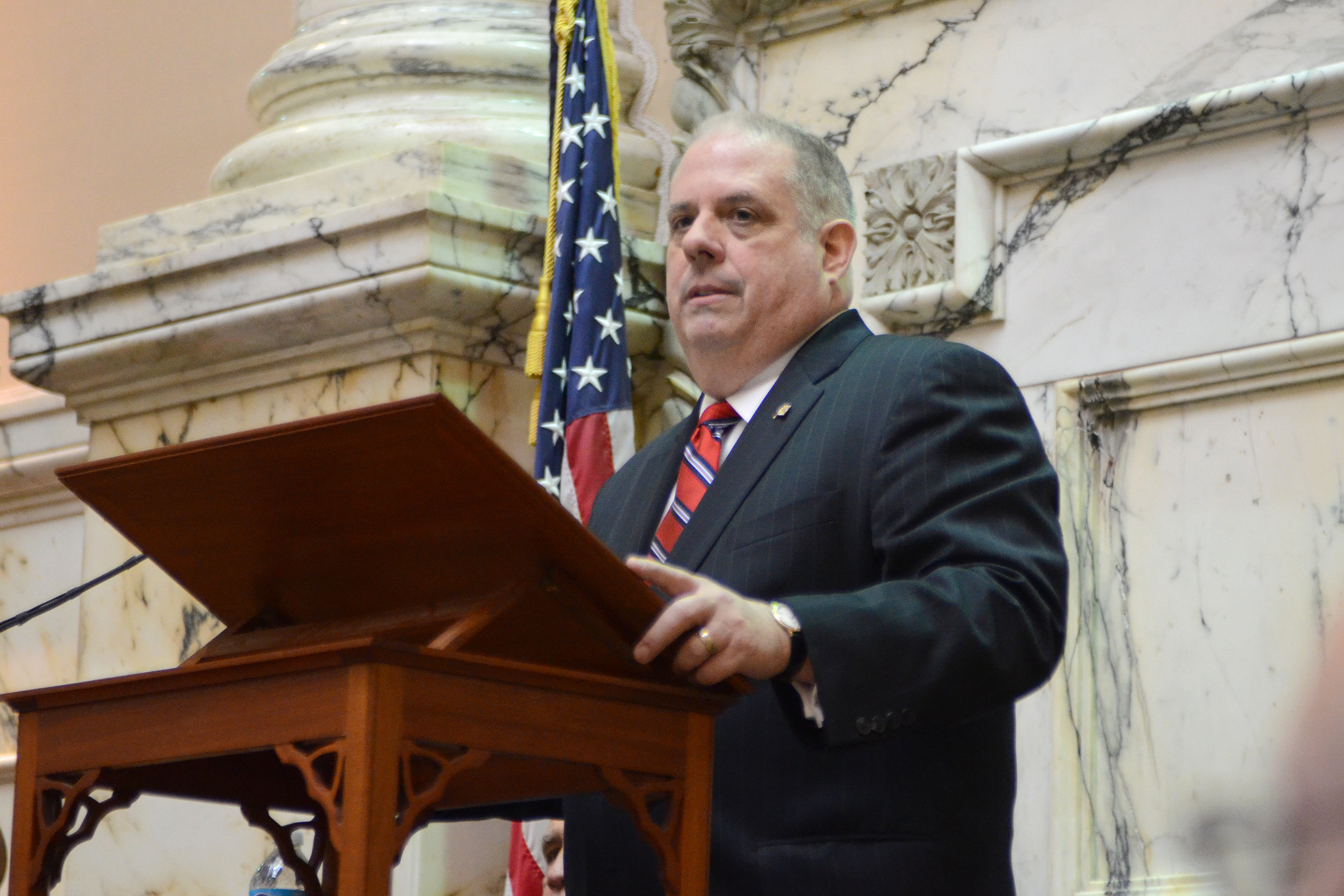
Governor Hogan canceled the project in 2015, diverting funding away from Baltimore to rural Maryland.

In August 2009, then-Governor Martin O'Malley (who was also a former mayor of Baltimore) selected a modified version of the Light Rail Alternative 4C, which became known as the "Locally Preferred Alternative (LPA)." The modification eliminated two stations and a small parking lot from the original Alternative 4C plans, but included an expansion of parking at the West Baltimore MARC station.

Two features of the original Alternative 4C plan, considered important by the Citizens Advisory Council, remained part of the Locally Preferred Alternative:

- Much of the proposed route through West Baltimore ran generally along U.S. Route 40, including the depressed freeway section left over from the cancellation of Interstates 70 and 170 within the city limits. This freeway section was built to accommodate a transit line in the median, and the Red Line would most likely have used this route to achieve grade separation though the area. The western end of former I-170 was demolished in 2010 to allow for additional parking and median access for the Red Line. A similar modification was also planned for the eastern end of former I-70, where the MD 122/Security Boulevard interchange would be converted to an at-grade intersection, and a new Park & Ride lot would have been built to replace the one that sits east of said interchange. At the rebuilt intersection, the Red Line would have gone through the western portal of the Cooks Lane tunnel, MD 122 would have tied directly into Forest Park Avenue, and Cooks Boulevard would have been a westward extension of Cooks Lane, built as a surface road on the old I-70 alignment. Although the modifications have not yet occurred, I-70 from MD 122 to I-695 was decommissioned in 2014 and now ends at its stack interchange with I-695; the freeway east of I-695 carries the unsigned designation of MD 570.
- The LPA provided for the line to go underground along Martin Luther King, Jr. Boulevard and to surface on Boston Street near the Can Company in Canton, bypassing downtown Baltimore's narrow streets and crowded traffic conditions. Another tunnel bypasses Cooks Lane, but the original LPA version reduced the tunnel to a single track alignment. Adjustments to the LPA were later made to allow a second track in the Cooks Lane tunnel.

With the Federal Transit Administration's approval in June 2011 to start preliminary engineering, the project made its first step beyond the concept stage; however, the FTA estimated daily ridership for the completed system at 57,000 and expected it to cost a total of $2.2 billion with inflation included. Henry Kay, MTA's deputy administrator, estimated the cost of preliminary engineering at $65 million. The state would have had to pay preliminary engineering costs, but Kay said that these and other upfront costs would be eligible for federal reimbursement.

== Cancellation and federal investigation ==
Governor Larry Hogan, who was elected in 2014, announced on June 25, 2015 that he had canceled funding for the Red Line. During his 2014 campaign, Hogan had complained about the cost of the proposed Red Line for Baltimore, calling it a "boondoggle", and a proposed Purple Line for the Maryland suburbs of Washington, DC; however, he ultimately allowed the Purple Line to begin construction with reduced funding.

=== Federal investigation ===
On December 21, 2015, the National Association for the Advancement of Colored People (NAACP), together with the American Civil Liberties Union of Maryland and Baltimore Regional Initiative Developing Genuine Equality (BRIDGE) filed a complaint pursuant to Title VI of the Civil Rights Act of 1964 with the U.S. Department of Transportation Departmental Office of Civil Rights. The complaint challenged Governor Hogan's decision to cancel the Red Line on the basis of discrimination against Baltimore's predominantly African American population that would have benefited from the infrastructure project. Furthermore, the complaint highlighted that Governor Hogan's decision shifted funding away from public transportation dependent citizens, and instead was dedicated towards highway projects in primarily white rural and suburban areas of the state.

On January 19, 2017, the last day of the Obama Administration, the Department of Transportation announced it expanded its investigation into Governor Hogan's decision to cancel the Red Line, as well as the rest of MDOT's programs to determine whether federal law was violated. In addition, the DOT stated that the state transportation agency did not take the federal law into account or the adverse impact it would have on African-Americans, nor did the Governor seek any input from MDOT in making the decision. In July 2017 the DOT announced that it was closing its investigation with no finding.

== Proposed route and stations ==
The alignment for the Red Line would have followed an east–west path. Starting from the west, the proposed stations were as follows:

Station Name	Parking	Connection	Station Location	Points of Interest
Centers for Medicare & Medicaid Services	no	79, 78, 31; CityLink Blue	Security Blvd / CMS Entrance	CMS, HHS, GSA
Security Square Mall	Parking	79, 31, 37, 107; CityLink Blue	Security Blvd / Belmont Av	Security Square Mall, Security Station Shopping Center
Social Security Administration	(A)	79, 31; CityLink Blue	Woodlawn Dr / Parallel Dr	SSA, Southwest Academy, Woodlawn
I-70 Park and Ride	Parking	79; CityLink Blue	Parallel Dr / Ingleside Av	East SSA, Gwynns Falls Trail
Tunnel portal at city/county line under Cooks Lane and resurface along Edmondson Avenue
Edmondson Village	Parking	78, 77, 38, 150; CityLink Blue	Edmondson Av / Swann Av	Edmondson Village Shopping Center, Library Edmondson Branch, Uplands, Westside Skills Center
Allendale	no	77, 38; CityLink Blue	Edmondson Av / Allendale St	Gwynns Falls/Leakin Park, Lyndhurst Park
Rosemont	no	78, 29, 77, 38, 80; CityLink Blue	W. Franklin St/Poplar Grove St	Franklintown Road Business Area, Rosemont Park, Western Cemetery
West Baltimore MARC	Parking	77, 80, 40, 163, 150; CityLink Blue, Orange, Green, Pink; MARC Penn Line	W. Mulberry St / N. Smallwood St	Bentalou Recreation Center, Grace Medical Center
Harlem Park	no	CityLink Navy	U.S. Route 40 / Carey St	Edgar Allan Poe House, Franklin Square, Harlem Square Park, Lafayette Square
Poppleton	(R)	80	N. Fremont Av / W. Baltimore St.	Baltimore Center Medical Examiner Office, Perkins Square, Lexington Terrace, Little Lithuania Park, Lithuanian Hall, UMD BioPark
Tunnel portal along Martin Luther King Jr. Boulevard
Howard Street/University Center	(P)	65, 76, 120, 160, 310?, 320?, 410?, 411?, 420? CityLink Navy, Purple, Red, Yellow, Blue, Orange; Light Rail	W. Lombard St / S. Howard St	Bromo Arts District, Camden Yards, Royal Farms Arena, UMB, Westside
Inner Harbor	(P)	65, 51, 54, 91; CityLink Red, Navy; Metro Subway; CCC: Orange, Purple	W. Lombard St / S. Charles St	Downtown Baltimore, Financial District, Harborplace, Market Place, McKeldin Square, National Aquarium, Power Plant Live!, Pratt Street Power Plant, World Trade Center
Harbor East	(P)	31; CCC: Orange, Green	Fleet St / S. Central Av	Harbor East Shopping District, Harbor Point, Institute of Marine & Environmental Technology, Little Italy, Pier Six Pavilion, Lewis Museum
Fells Point	no	CityLink Gold, Navy	Fleet St / S. Broadway	Broadway Market, Fells Point, Maritime Park, Thames Street Park, Upper Fell's Point
Tunnel portal along Boston Street
Canton	Parking	65; CityLink Navy	Boston St / O'Donnell St	The Can Company, O'Donnell Square, Patterson Park, Saint Casmir's Park
Canton Crossing	Parking	65; CityLink Navy	Boston St / Conkling St	Brewers Hill, Canton Crossing Shopping Center, Burns Arena, Canton Waterfront Park, Charm City Skate Park
Highlandtown/Greektown	no	22; CityLink Navy	Eastern Av / Janney St	Library Southeast Anchor Branch, Greektown, Highlandtown, Kresson, Markets at Highlandtown
Viaduct between Highlandtown station and Bayview MARC station
Bayview	(F)	22; CityLink Orange, Blue	Alpha Commons Dr / Bayview Blvd	JHBMC, Johns Hopkins Asthma & Allergy Center, National Institute on Aging
East Baltimore/Bayview MARC	Parking	22, 59, 63; CityLink Orange, Blue; MARC Penn Line	E. Lombard St (east of Bioscience Dr)	East Baltimore/Bayview station, Pulaski Industrial Area, Joseph E. Lee Park, Patterson High School
Future extension to Dundalk
Eastern Avenue	no	22, 40, 59, 63; CityLink Orange, Blue	Eastern Av / Dundalk Av	JHBMC
O'Donnell Street	no	63; CityLink Navy	Dundalk Av / O'Donnell St	Amazon Warehouse, Mt. Carmel Cemetery
Dundalk Center Place	(R)	62, 63, 65, 163; CityLink Navy	Dundalk Av / Center Pl	CCBC Dundalk, Downtown Dundalk, St. Helena Park

Notes

- A authorized employee parking only
- F facility parking only
- P paid parking
- R residential parking only

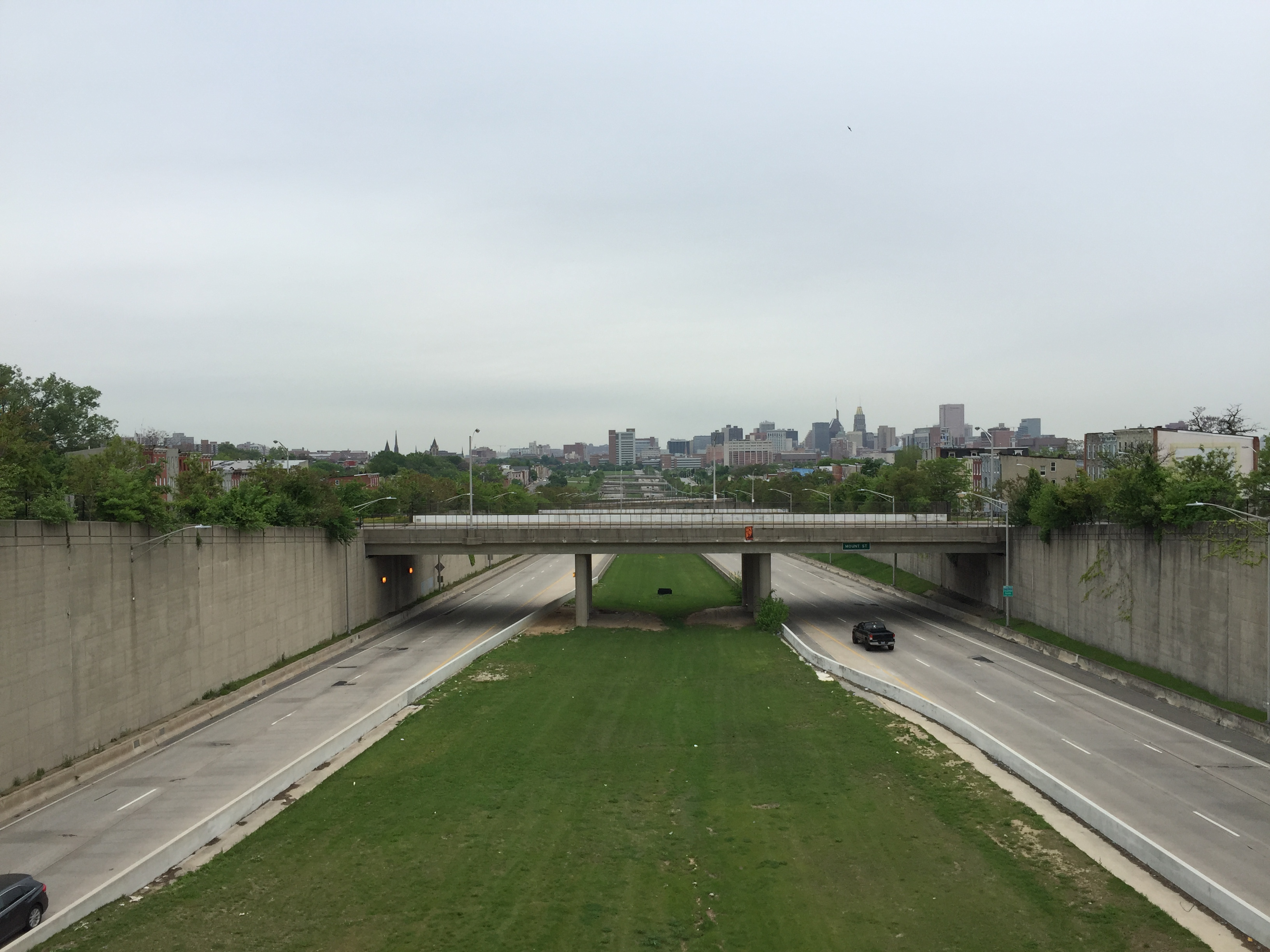
The Red Line would have occupied the central median of the infamous "Highway to Nowhere" (US 40.)

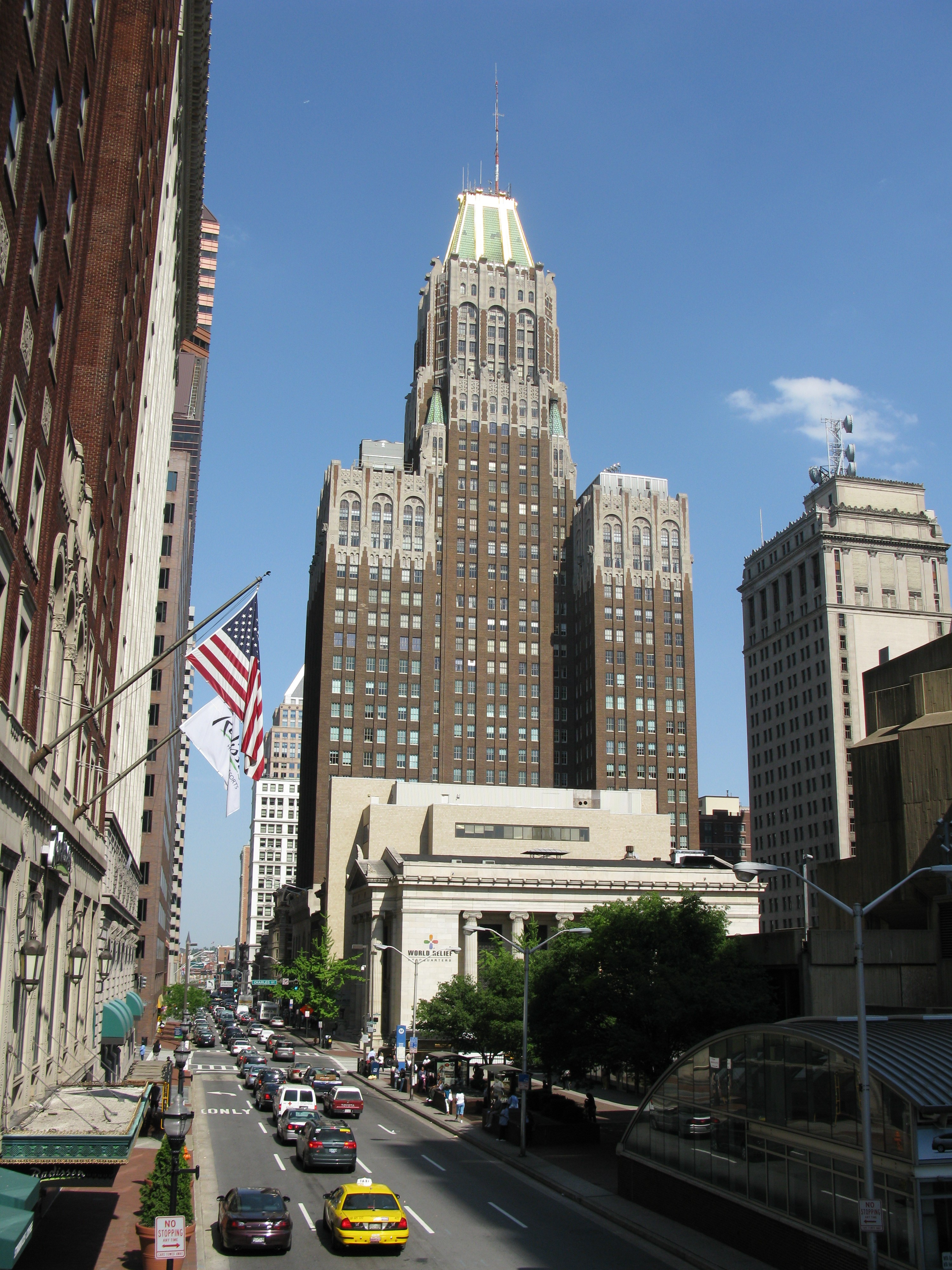
The Inner Harbor station would connect to Charles Center (lower right) via an underground transfer.

=== Red Line system features ===
Feature	Proposed alignment
Overall length	14.5 mi (23.3 km)
Surface length	9.8 mi (15.8 km)
Tunnel length	3.9 mi (6.3 km)
Aerial length	0.8 mi (1.3 km)
Stations	20 total (15 surface, 5 underground)
Parking	6 stations with parking areas
Travel time	44 minutes (Woodlawn to Bayview)
Vehicles	34 light rail vehicles
Service frequency	8 minutes peak, 10 minutes off peak

== Plans revived ==
The Infrastructure Investment and Jobs Act contains a provision on project reentry which directs the United States Secretary of Transportation to "provide full and fair consideration to projects that seek an updated rating after a period of inactivity." This provision was sought by Maryland Senator Ben Cardin with the intent to allow for the Red Line and other canceled transit projects to be renewed. On June 15, 2023, Governor Wes Moore announced that he would restart efforts to build the Red Line in a ceremony with Baltimore mayor Brandon Scott. The state Department of Transportation plans to identify possible route alignments, gauge public feedback, and study the project's costs and benefits over the course of the rest of the year. In the meantime, the MTA will provide limited-stop bus service between Catonsville and Essex beginning in August 2023. MTA released six new alternative routes for the project that September – two alternatives featured tunnel segments and alignments similar to the canceled 2009 route. Officials initially did not say if the route would be run by bus rapid transit or light rail, but later announced in June 2024 that it will feature light rail.

In 2026, installation of bus lanes along the Red Line route began. The project was designed to improve service for the MTA CityLink Orange and Blue routes, and the QuickLink 40 route.

== See also ==
- Green Line – a proposed rail line in Baltimore from Johns Hopkins Hospital to Morgan State University.
- Yellow Line – a proposed rail line from Hunt Valley to Columbia Town Center.
- Charles Street Trolley – a proposed trolley line in northern Baltimore, backed by a non-MTA group.
