= Thomas J. Smrt =

- Born: August 3, 1928
- Died: August 11, 2017 (age 89)
- Occupations: Inventor entrepreneur theme park operator

Thomas J. Smrt was an American inventor, businessman and entrepreneur who is best known as the inventor of the upside-down aerosol spray paint can. He was previously the owner of Fox Valley Systems, a company that marketed his spray paint applicators, however he sold the company to his sons in 2006 (the company closed in 2013 after an industrial accident and was subsequently bought out by competitor ARC Sporting Goods). He is also known for breeding rare Shire horses (helping to increase their overall population from just 50 horses when he began), and for opening the short-lived Shireland theme park.

== Early life ==
Smrt was born in 1928. His father died when he was four years old and he had several different stepfathers growing up. He did not advance past the 8th grade, however he went on to serve in the military and eventually become a successful businessman. Smrt later married and had four children.

== Inventions ==
Smrt's most notable invention is the upside-down aerosol spray paint can: a can of spray paint that can be applied while holding the can upside down (which is impossible with typical spray paint cans). This is widely used in municipal and highway applications for outlining parking lots, turn lanes, center lines, crosswalks, etc. They are also commonly used for painting hashmarks and lines on athletic fields.

His patents dated back to 1977 and include paint application devices, vacuum sealed packing materials, geodesic domes, and mechanical arms.

== Charity ==
Smrt was known for varied charitable donations. On one particular occasion, he called his local police department to ask if they needed anything. When the officer answering the phone mentioned that they needed a new booking camera and some "first response" pocketknives (used to cut away seat belts from car accident victims), Smrt purchased the items and had them sent to the station. When one of his employees presented them to the police, he stated "Mr. Smrt would like other industries to follow his lead. So many departments go without some of the things they need. It makes him happy to return favors for all the work the department does."

== Horse breeding ==
Smrt owned Fox Valley Farms in Marengo, Illinois, where he bred, showed and sold rare Shire horses. At one time, there were only 50 of this breed left in the world. Smrt took an interest in them, shipped some to his farm and began breeding them. By the mid 1980s, their numbers had increased significantly, to the point that he was able to donate 40 of the horses to the Caisson Unit of the United States Army (used for parades and demonstrations).

Fox Valley Farms was used as a filming location in the 1986 film Nothing in Common, starring Tom Hanks and Jackie Gleason. Smrt himself has a small role in the film as "Mr. Egan".

In 2012, Fox Valley Farms closed and all equipment (including signage and displays from the shuttered Shireland Amusement Park) were auctioned off.

== Shireland ==
On May 28, 1988, Smrt held the grand opening for a new shire horse-based theme park on Dietrich Road and Lake Street in Hampshire, Illinois. The park covered 111 acres (0.45 km^{2}) and contained a 68,000-square-foot (6,300 m^{2}) circus tent as well as four 10,000-square-foot (930 m^{2}) exhibit tents. The concept centered on the horses, however it also incorporated traditional clown shows. It followed a medieval theme, with area names like "dragonwood" (a small forest which incorporated a tram ride, animatronic dragons, and "shire knights riding shire horses). At the end of the summer 1988, Shireland shut down for unspecified reasons and did not reopen until 1991. It was open for the summer of 1991, after which it closed to the public. It held a horse show and sale in the fall of 1991, closing permanently afterwards. The property sat mostly untouched for 15 years thereafter and became a popular place for urban exploration groups to take photographs. In June 2005, Smrt sold the property to a developer who began demolishing the existing buildings but had no specific plans to develop the property.
