= Maryland Transit Administration =

Public transit authority of the state of Maryland

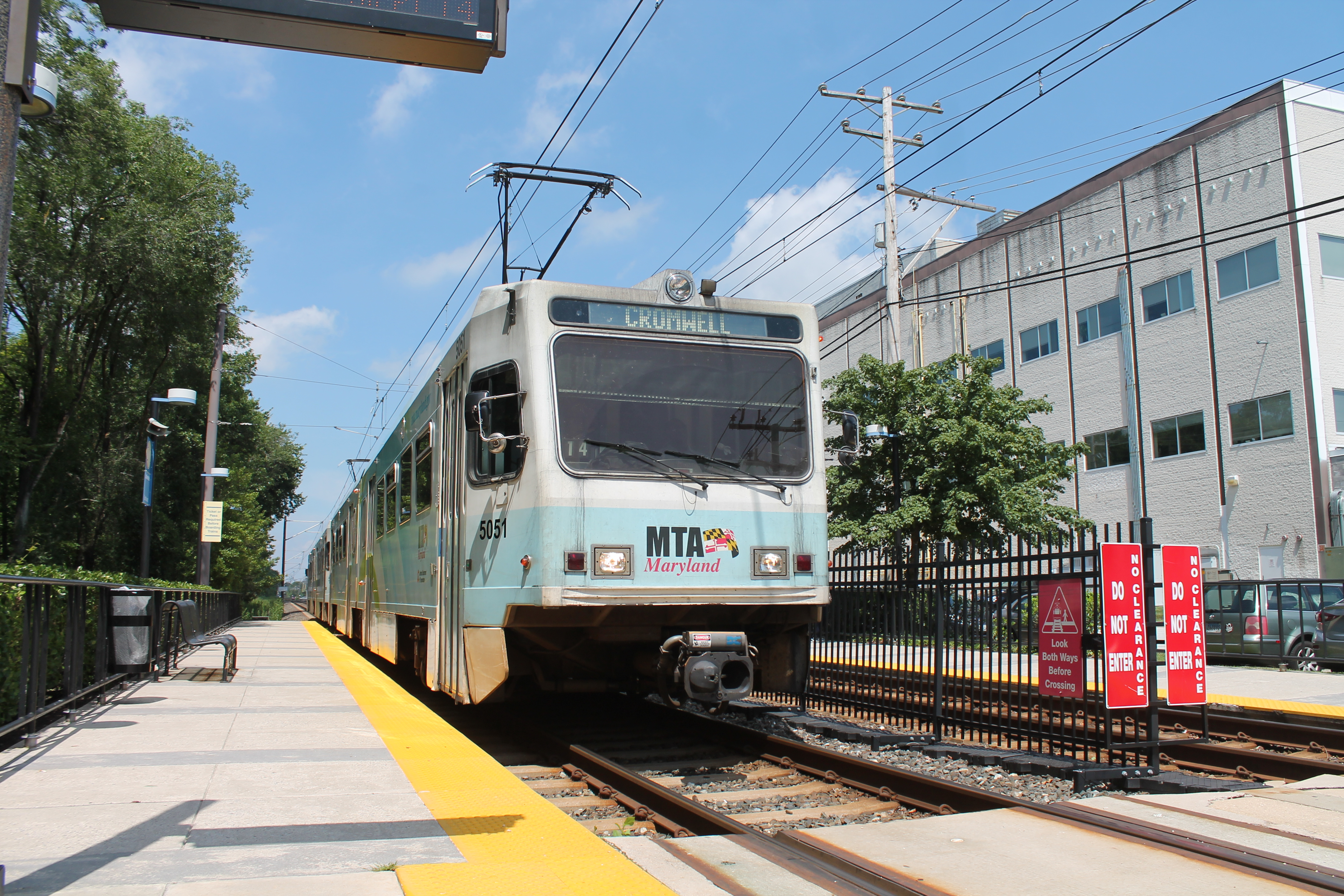
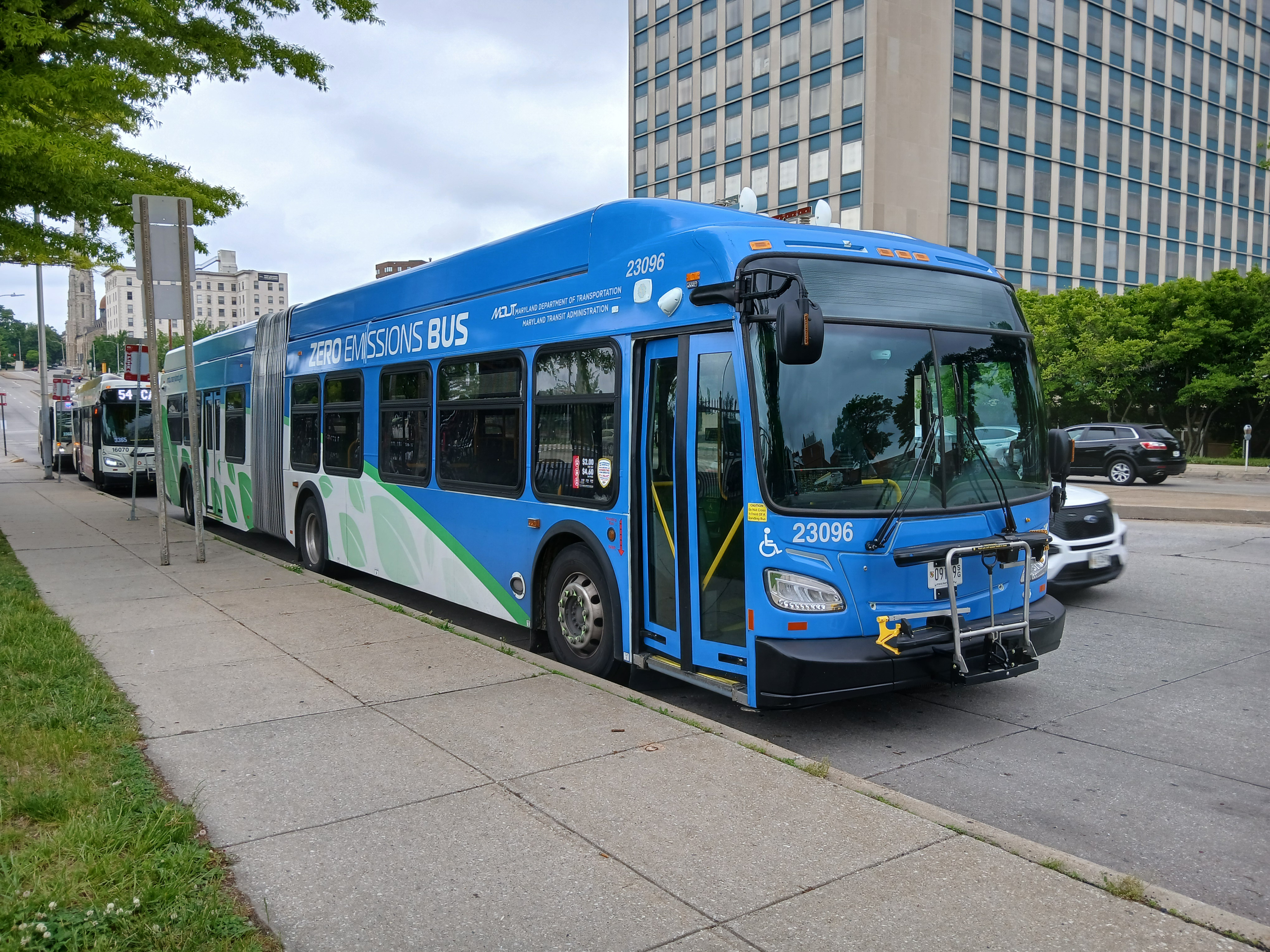
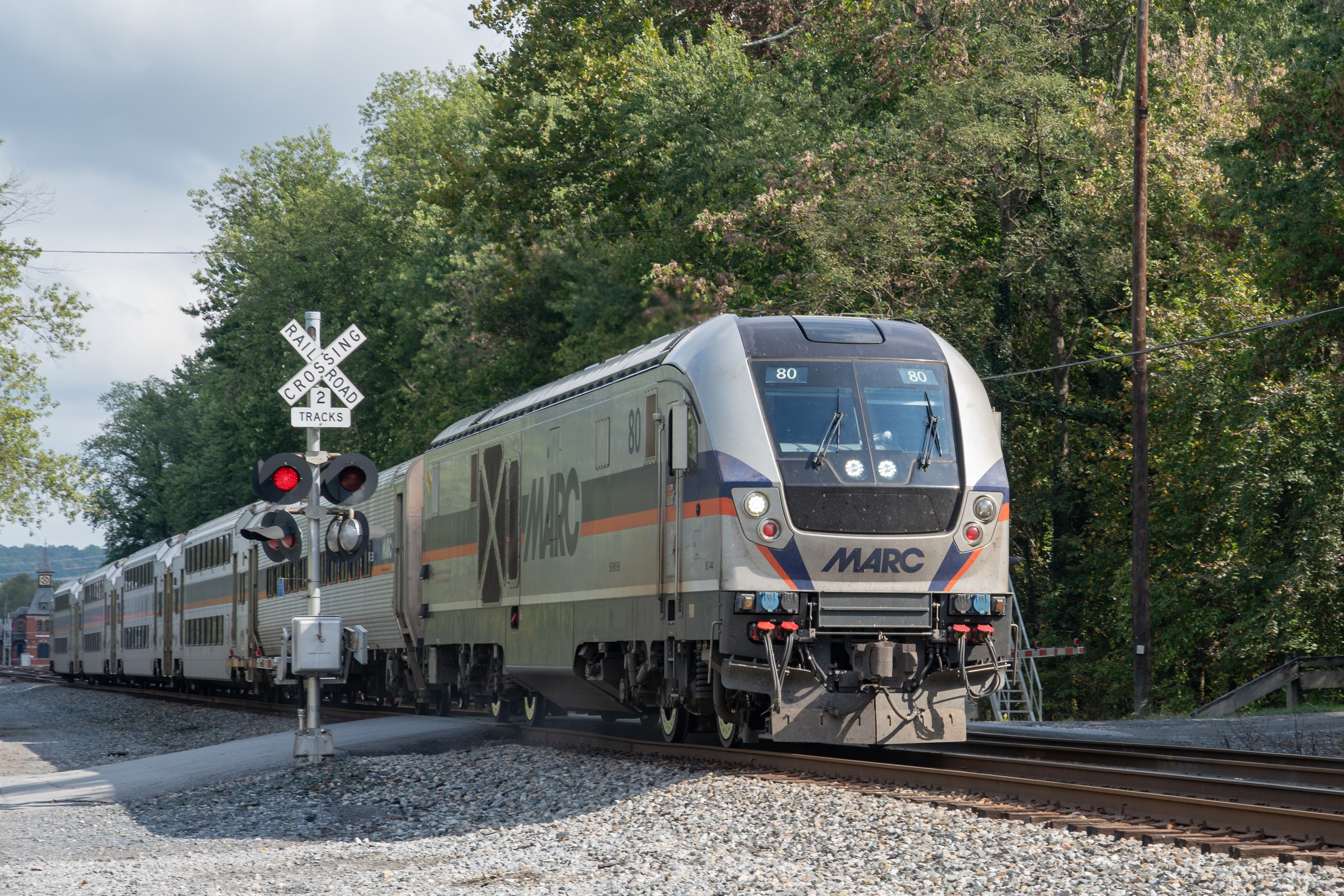
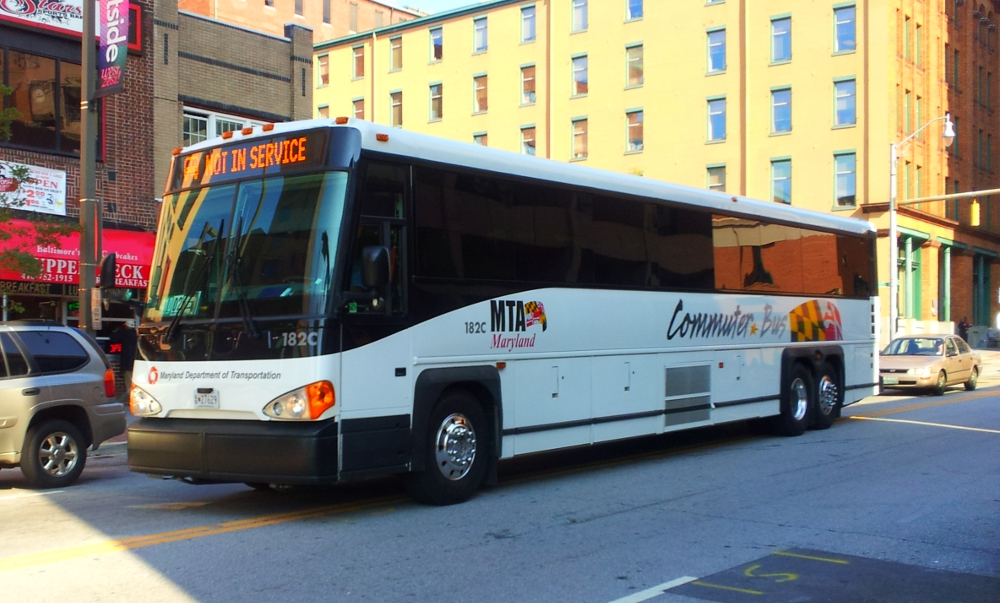
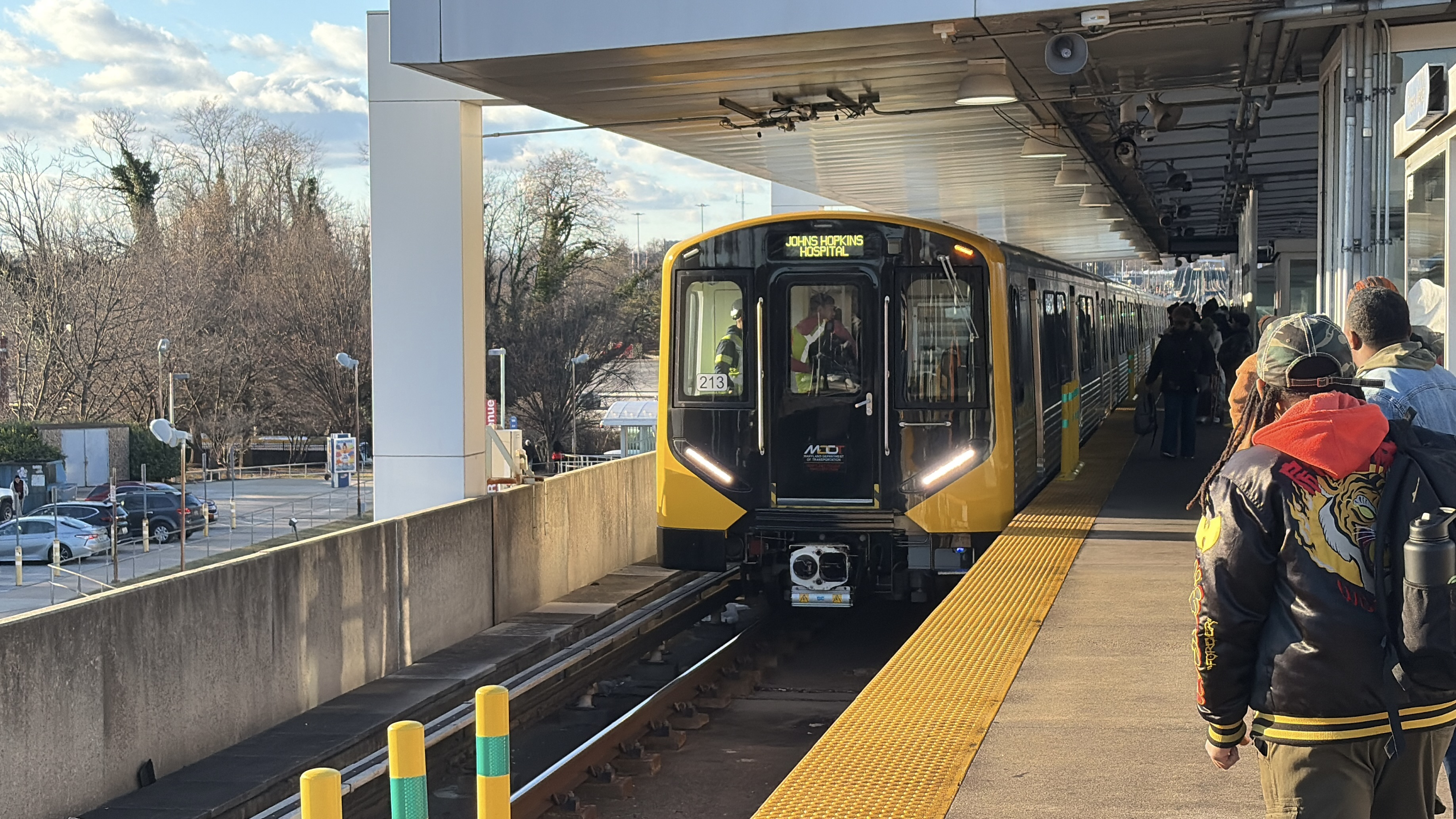
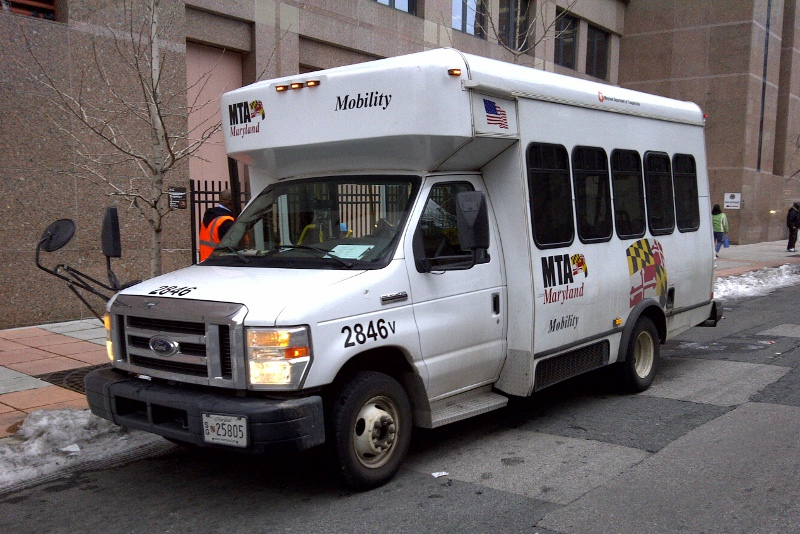
- Gallery of MTA services

Overview
- Locale: Washington-Baltimore metropolitan area
- Transit type: Local bus; Express bus; Light rail; Commuter rail; Rapid transit; Paratransit
- Number of lines: Heavy rail: 1 Light rail: 3 Commuter rail: 3 Bus: 80
- Number of stations: Heavy rail: 14; Light rail: 33; Commuter rail: 43
- Daily ridership: 227,000 (weekdays, Q2 2026)
- Annual ridership: 67,092,400 (2025)
- Chief executive: Tony Bridges
- Website: mta.maryland.gov

Operation
- Began operation: April 30, 1970; 56 years ago
- Operator: Maryland Department of Transportation
- Number of vehicles: Heavy Rail: 100; Light Rail: 53; Commuter rail: 175; Bus: 842; Mobility vans: 303; Mobility sedans: 124 (2010)

Technical
- System length: Heavy rail: 15.2 miles (24.5 km); Light rail: 30 miles (48 km); Commuter rail: 187 miles (301 km)
- Track gauge: 4 ft 8 1/2 in (1,435 mm) standard gauge

The Maryland Transit Administration (MTA) is a state-operated mass transit administration in Maryland, and is part of the Maryland Department of Transportation (MDOT). The MTA operates a comprehensive transit system throughout the Washington-Baltimore metropolitan area. There are 80 bus lines serving the Baltimore Metropolitan Area, along with rail services that include the Baltimore Light RailLink, Baltimore Metro Subway, and MARC Train. In 2025, the system had a ridership of 67,092,400, or about 227,000 per weekday as of the second quarter of 2026.

With 27% of Baltimore households lacking access to a car, the MTA is an important part of the regional transit picture. The system has many connections to other transit agencies of Central Maryland, Washington, D.C., Northern Virginia, and south-central Pennsylvania (Hanover, Harrisburg, and York): WMATA, Charm City Circulator, Regional Transportation Agency of Central Maryland, Annapolis Transit, Rabbit Transit, Ride-On, and TransIT.

== History ==
The MTA took over the operations of the old Baltimore Transit Company on April 30, 1970. It was originally known as the Baltimore Metropolitan Transit Authority, then the Mass Transit Administration before it changed to its current name in October 2001.

Many of the routes of most of the agency's current bus lines are based on the original streetcars operated by the Baltimore Transit Company and its parent companies from the 1890s to the 1960s. All these routes were ultimately converted to rubber tire bus operations, and many of them were consolidated, extended into newly developed areas, or otherwise reconfigured to keep up with the ridership demands of the times. Additional routes and extensions were added in later years to serve communities that were later developed, and to feed into Metro and Light Rail stations that were later built.

With the growth in popularity of the private automobile during the 20th century, pushed along by active corporate sabotage of streetcar systems nationwide, streetcar and bus ridership declined, and the perceived need for public transportation changed. Mass transit in Baltimore and other cities shifted from corporate operations to services funded and run by the government. The amount of service provided was greatly reduced, and some areas once served by streetcars are currently served by buses very minimally or not at all. The demise of the Baltimore streetcar took place between the years of 1947 and 1963, as operators found buses to be low maintenance and more cost-efficient. As rails were demolished and paved over, Baltimore was no longer a streetcar city. As transit needs and trends changed, rail transit did return to the city, with the Metro Subway opening in 1983 and the Light Rail in 1992. The track gauge was 5 ft 4 1/2 in (1,638 mm), a unique gauge.

== Bus routes ==
The MTA operates bus services primarily within the Baltimore metropolitan area, with some peripheral commuter bus connections in the Washington, D.C., metropolitan area, Kent Island, southern Maryland, and western Maryland. The local bus network operated as a daily service is centered in and around Baltimore, with most routes traveling between the city and adjacent Baltimore County or Anne Arundel County communities, and a few routes providing connections between suburban communities.

=== Local bus ===
Since the BaltimoreLink rebranding in 2017, MTA local service routes have been given either CityLink color scheme designations or LocalLink numbered designations. CityLink routes operate at higher frequency and for a longer duration than LocalLink routes, however, together they function as part of the same network and each individual route has its own duration and frequency which varies based on day of the week and time of day. Most of the routes originate in whole or in part from routes which followed a cohesive number scheme prior to 2017; that number scheme in turn was derived directly from the corresponding historical streetcar routes.

CityLink bus line designations are each assigned a color and two-letter abbreviation for that color. Some of the color designations describe shades of the same color, such as the Green and Lime routes or the Blue and Navy routes. The naming scheme also does not disambiguate the colored route names of the Charm City Circulator routes operated in an overlapping service area by Baltimore or the Baltimore County Loop routes operated in an overlapping service area in Towson.

LocalLink bus line designations are numbered across two ranges which loosely correspond to two categories, crosstown routes (21–38) and feeder routes (51–95). There is not one consistent pattern which describes each range, however. For example, LocalLink 80 is a route which provides primarily intra-city service and does not follow the "spoke-and-wheel" pattern associated with feeder routes. The numbering scheme excludes all the historic route numbers which were deprecated in 2017, and not every number in the listed ranges is used for a route. Some of the LocalLink lines are part of the frequent network alongside the CityLink routes, or operate on 24-hour schedules.

In April 2022, the MTA announced a proposal to introduce the first new local bus designation since 2017, the LocalLink 32, which is intended to replace the branch of the CityLink Yellow which travels to the University of Maryland, Baltimore County.

=== Quickbus ===
Until June 2017, The MTA operated four limited-stop routes known as Quickbus or qb, which were designated as routes qb40, qb46, qb47, and qb48. In April 2022, the MTA announced the proposed revival of the Quickbus 40 route as the QuickLink 40 in Fall 2022. As of May 2022, the agency is soliciting public feedback on this proposal alongside other service adjustments. In Fall 2023 Quicklink 40 has been reintroduce into service mirroring the prelink Quickbus 40).

=== Neighborhood Shuttle Bug ===
Until June 2017, The MTA had two neighborhood shuttle routes: The Mondawmin Shuttle Bug Route 97 and the Hampden Shuttle Bug Route 98. These routes can be identified by their distinctive brand colors and logos.

=== Express bus ===
The MTA operates 9 express bus lines in the Baltimore area, which are the 103, 105, 115, 120, 150, 154, 160, and 163.

=== Commuter bus ===
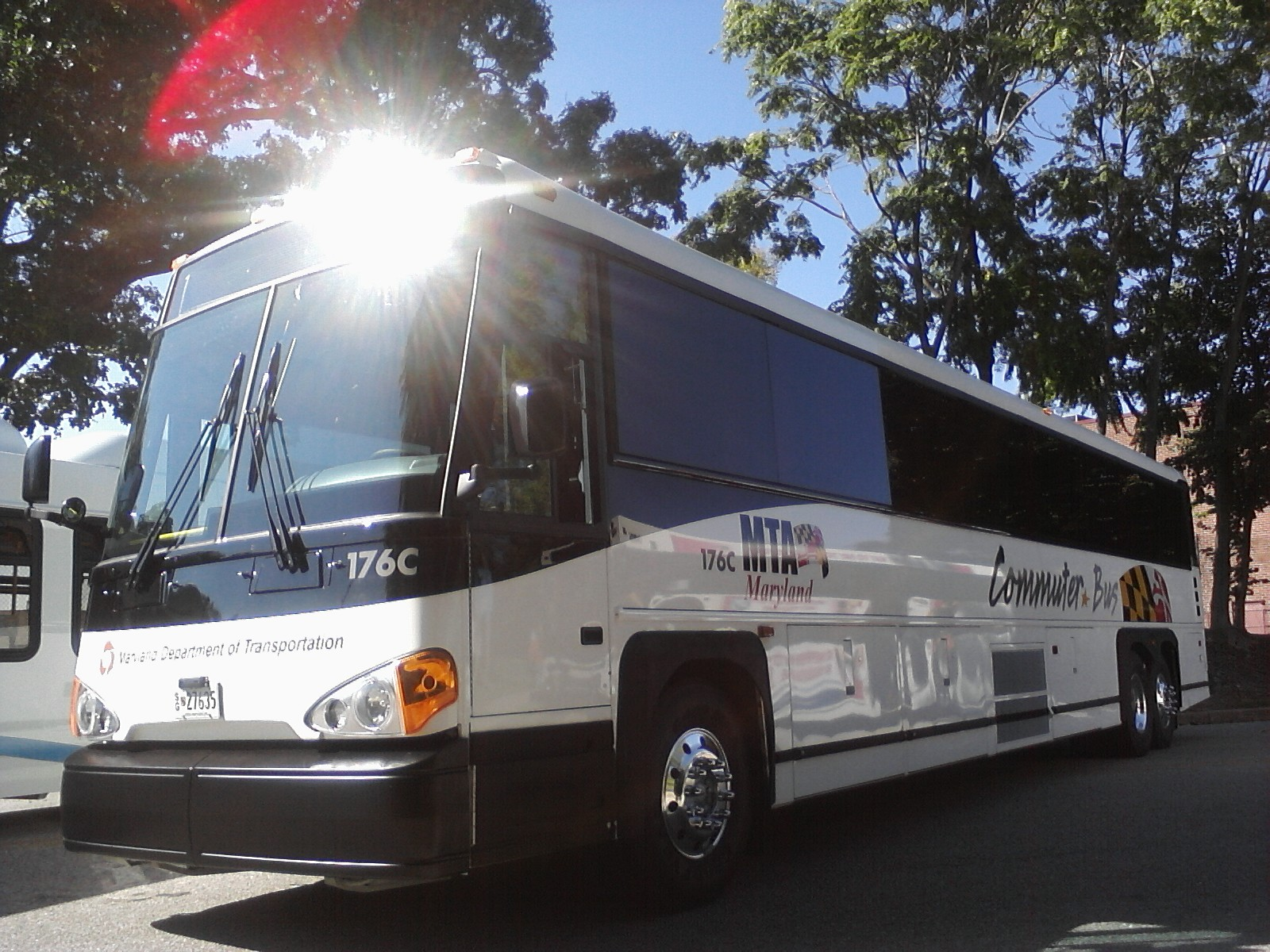
MTA MCI D4500CTH #176

Independent bus companies operate 26 commuter bus routes in the Washington, D.C., and Baltimore regions. There are five Baltimore-bound bus lines numbered in the 300 and 400 range; while the 16 Washington-bound bus lines are numbered in the 600 and 900 range. These routes range from 310 through 995. Buses travelling on MD 200 are numbered in the 200 range. Five routes ranging 201 through 205.

== Rail services ==
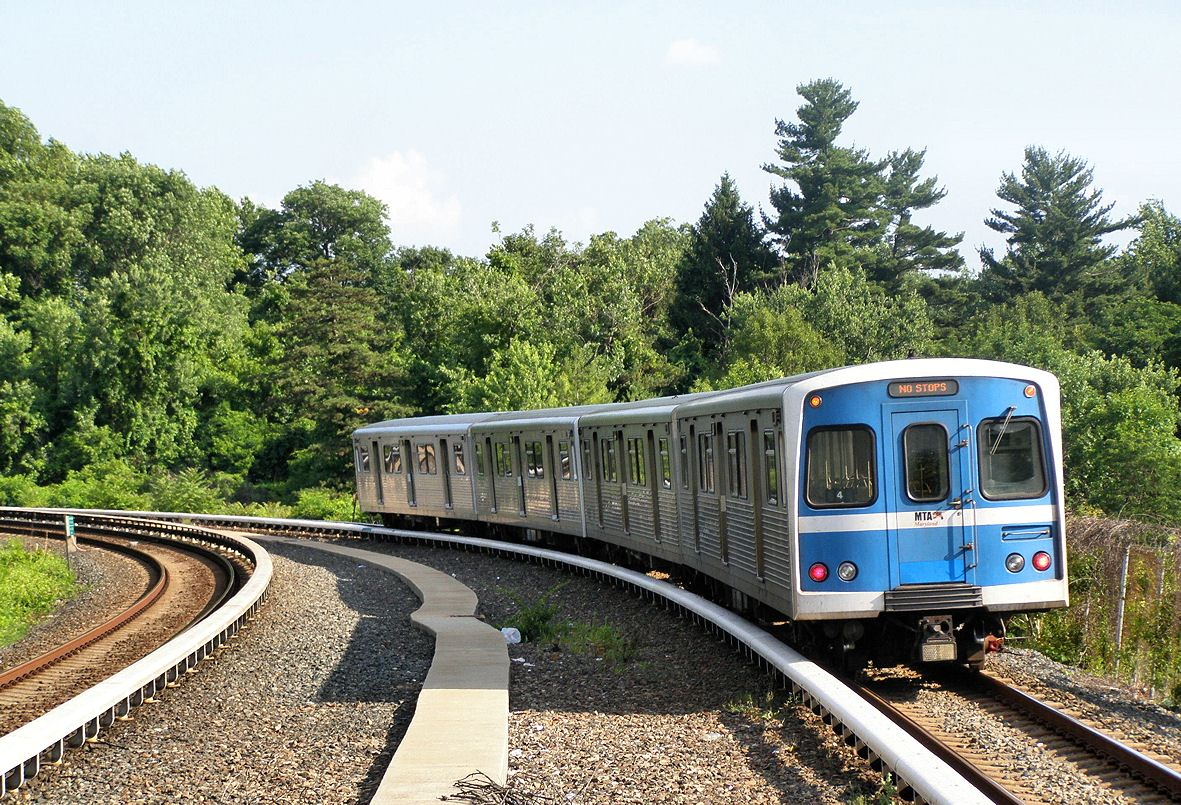
Budd built Universal Transit Vehicle as seen on the Baltimore Metro SubwayLink departing Milford Mill station

Interactive map of the Maryland Transit Administration's rail services

=== Rapid transit ===
This system operates elevated and underground from a corporate and shopping complex in Owings Mills in Baltimore County into the heart of Downtown Baltimore City's business, shopping and sightseeing districts to the world-renowned Johns Hopkins Medical Center Complex. The 15.5-mile (24.94 km) northwest-southeastbound route includes 14 station stops. Its route through the densest parts of the city is underground, from Hopkins Hospital to a portal west of Mondawmin station, where it immediately rises to an elevated concrete right of way parallel to Wabash Avenue practically at the city line.

Entering Baltimore County, the line goes to the surface, passing through communities along the way to commuter-based stops at Milford Mill Road (Pikesville) and Old Court Road (Pikesville). From Old Court, the tracks pass underneath the I-695/795 interchange and travel the median of 795 till their end at Owings Mills (Painter's Mill Road) This station is the centerpiece of a huge project urbanizing that immediate area, with a Baltimore County Public Library branch, and classroom space for the Community College of Baltimore County. Residential and commercial development is planned to follow the completion of the education buildings.

There were efforts underway to extend the line northeast through the city with phase 1 to Morgan State University and phase 2 beyond the city limits to the White Marsh Town Center area. If they come to fruition, the line will be renamed the Green Line, coordinating with the Red Line (east-west Woodlawn/Security-Hopkins Bayview Hospital) which Maryland Governor Larry Hogan cancelled on June 25, 2017, with the creation of Baltimore Link. Baltimore's plans for transit were not mapped and $900 million of federally funded money was sent back. Funding for the Green Line extension is still years from being secured but includes an option to extend it as light rail or BRT from Johns Hopkins Hospital.

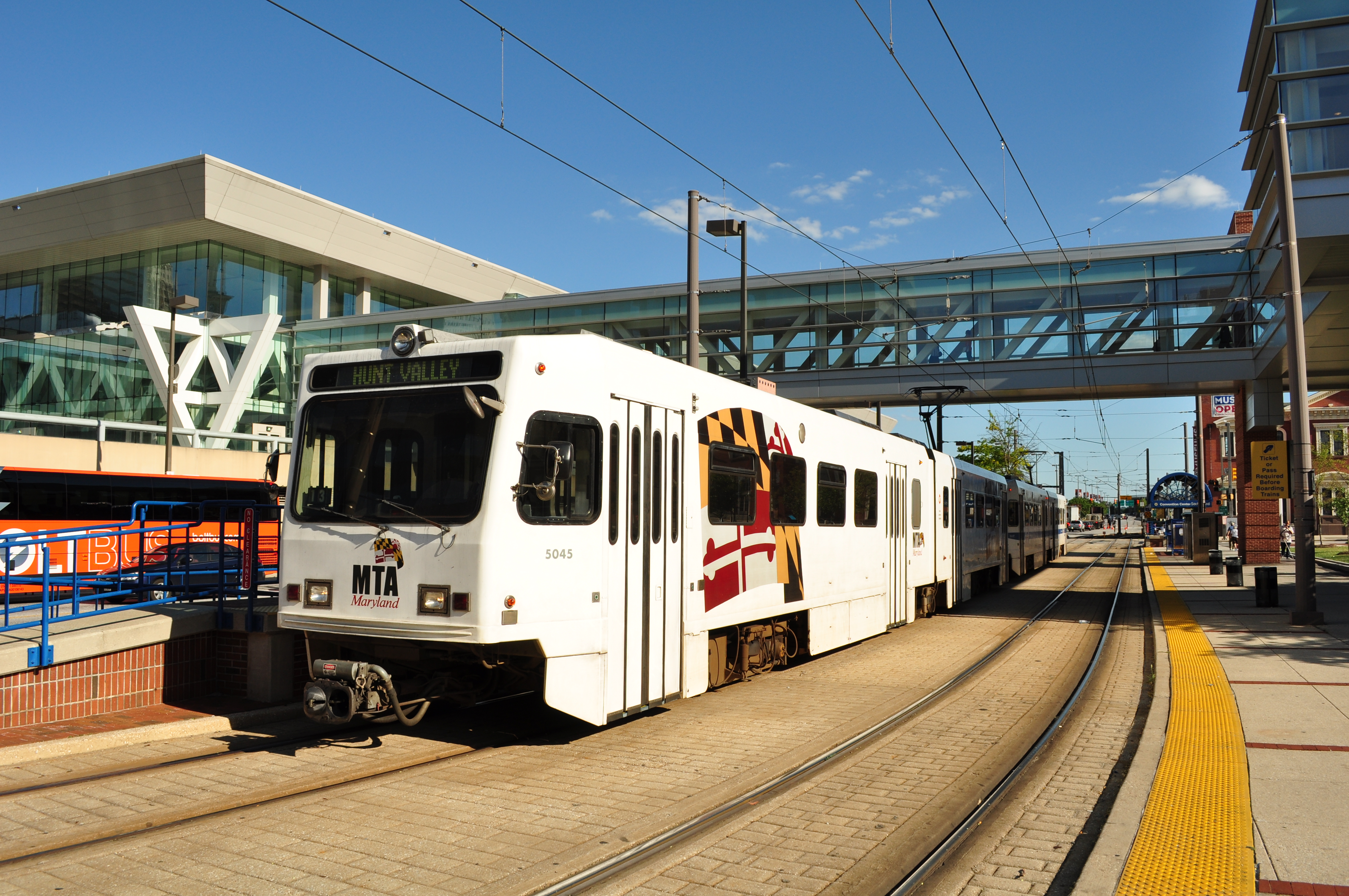
An ABB built 2-car light rail at Convention Center/ Pratt Street Stop

=== Light rail ===
This service travels from a corporate, hotel, and shopping complex in Baltimore County's Hunt Valley, through the suburbs north of Baltimore and northern Baltimore and into the heart of downtown Baltimore's shopping, sightseeing, dining, and entertainment districts, past the harbor and through southern Baltimore and finally to BWI Marshall Airport and Cromwell Station/Glen Burnie in Anne Arundel County. There is also a spur to Amtrak's Baltimore Penn Station.

The Light RailLink operates at grade for the most part, though it travels on bridges crossing several bodies of water. There are 33 station stops along the 30.0-mile (48.28 km) system. Although much of the line was single-tracked when it was built, the MTA completed a double-tracking project on February 26, 2006, and now only a few short single-track sections remain.

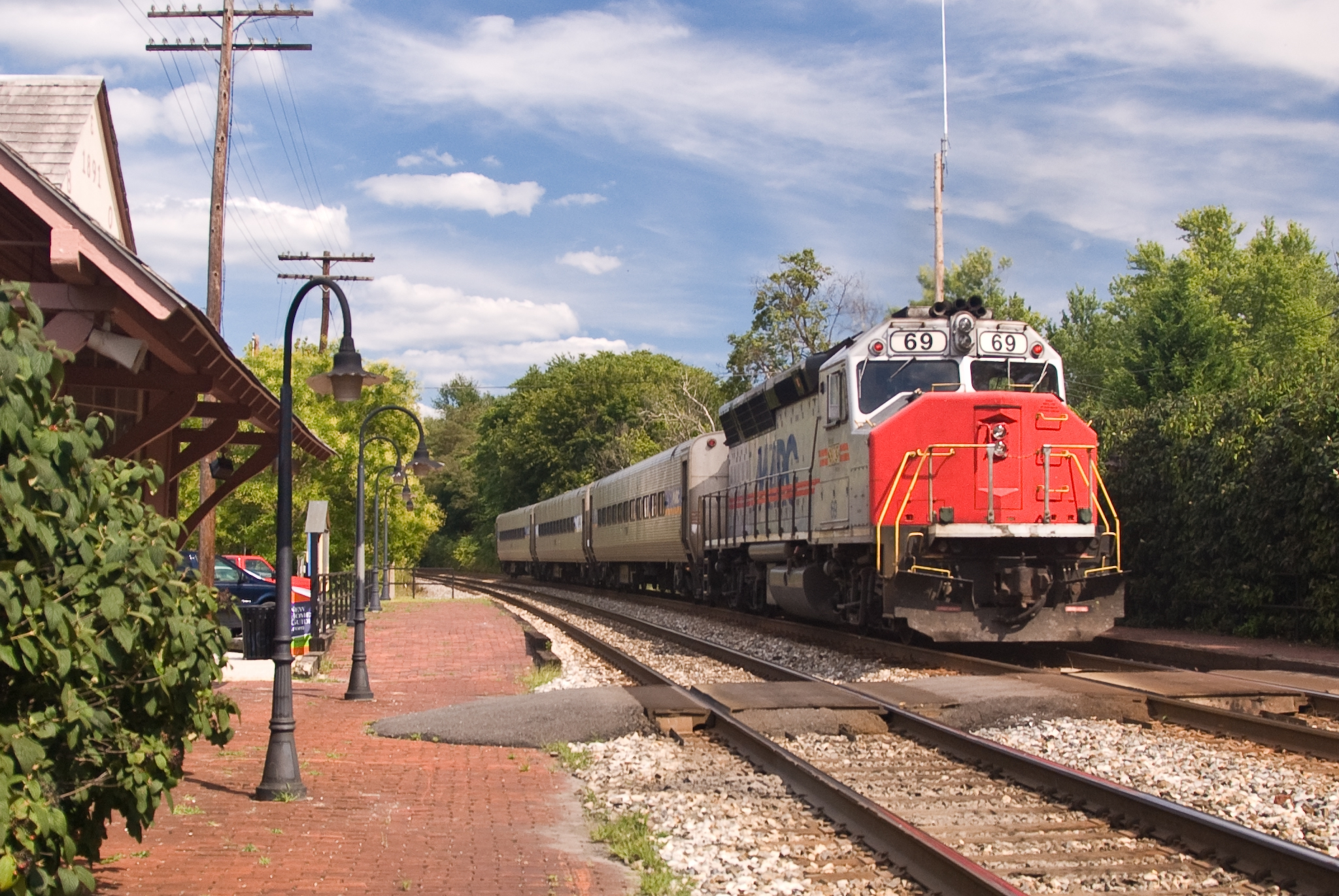
MARC commuter train at Dickerson station

=== Commuter rail ===
This service operates three lines that provide commuter rail service to riders out of and into Baltimore, Washington, D.C., Frederick, Perryville, and Martinsburg, WV, as well as several other locations in between.

== Mobility services ==
=== Paratransit ===
The MTA began offering paratransit service for persons with disabilities in 1978 when it took over a mobility service in Baltimore previously operated by Lutheran Family Services. This mobility service is a "non-fixed route" service and consists of a fleet of specially converted Ford E-Series vans and Ford Crown Victorias. Some service is contracted out to MV Transportation and Transdev, but all vehicles are owned by MTA.

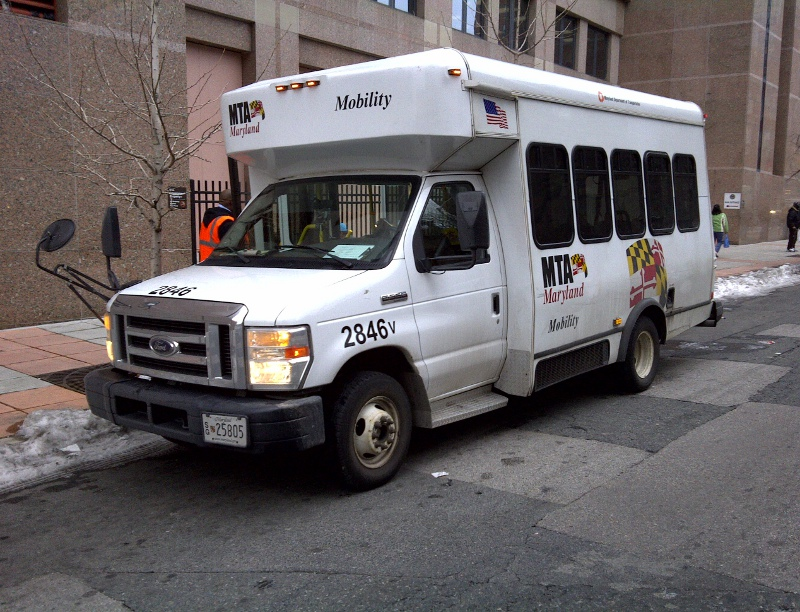
MTA Ford E-Series van used for Mobility services.

=== Taxi Access ===
A sub-service of the Paratransit program is MTA's Taxi Access program. The Taxi Access program ensures that any sufficiently physically disabled person that consistently requires Paratransit service can also qualify for the Taxi Access program. The Taxi Access program allows the bearer of a Taxi Access card to take a taxicab door-to-door within the limits of anywhere MTA Paratransit vans go; i.e. within 1/3 of a mile of an MTA public transit stop of any kind. Once the trip is complete, total out-of-pocket cost for the customer is $3.00, and the MTA picks up the rest of the price of the fare, "paying" it to the driver in the form of a voucher that s/he later redeems at his/her cab company headquarters.

== Future service ==
The MTA is building the Purple Line, a light rail system that will operate between Bethesda and New Carrollton with connections to the Washington Metro. As of early 2026, MTA is projecting that the line will begin passenger operations in late 2027.

== Proposed services ==
The MTA has studied a number of proposed services, which included the Red Line (a proposed east–west light rail line that would have passed from Woodlawn pass near Patterson Park) to Johns Hopkins Bayview Med. Ctr. and the Green Line (a proposed north–south line that would have extended from the Johns Hopkins Hospital into northeast Baltimore, possibly as an extension of the Metro Subway). As of summer 2011, the Red Line had received federal permission to enter preliminary engineering. Both lines were cancelled by Gov. Larry Hogan in June 2015.

The Corridor Cities Transitway, a proposed 15-mile (24 km) bus rapid transit line between Gaithersburg and Clarksburg, was allocated some initial planning and design funds in 2013. In 2016 MDOT removed the project from its priority list, and from the Consolidated Transportation Plan in 2019.

== BaltimoreLink ==
BaltimoreLink was an overhaul of the core MTA bus service within and around Baltimore. The plan was announced by then-governor Larry Hogan in 2015, as part of a $135 million investment to help improve the transit system through the entire Baltimore metropolitan area. Hogan had previously rejected the Red Line and Green Line light-rail projects.

== Fare collection ==
Prior to the summer of 2005, the MTA used an older fare collection system. Day passes purchased on buses were printed out by a separate machine from the bus fareboxes. It was possible to alter these passes so that they could be used on other days and to sell them to other passengers or make duplicate passes and sell them to others for cheaper than the MTA's official fares. This was despite the fact that they were officially non-transferable.

The MTA has since installed new fareboxes on all of its buses that issue daily passes with magnetic strips; new ticket vending machines at Light Rail and Metro Subway stations issue identical passes including the weekly and monthly passes. Weekly and monthly passes are not sold on buses.

The newer day passes can be used only on the appropriate day because the machine encodes the date and expiration time in the magnetic strip, which is read when swiped through the magnetic reader. Swiping the pass also sets a time waiting period on reuse so the pass cannot be immediately handed to a different passenger and used for free boarding. This also makes it difficult for passengers to use counterfeit passes when boarding the bus, Light Rail, and Metro Subway.

The MTA continues to struggle with passengers who purchase day passes, use them, then resell them at a direct loss to the agency. State employees who possess a Maryland State Employee ID card can ride MTA local bus, Light Rail, and the Metro Subway free of charge. Any state employee with the ID card can get a continuation ticket to get through the gates on the Metro Subway. For the bus, the person shows the state employee ID card to the driver when boarding. On the Light Rail, they have to show the ID card only in the event of a fare inspection while other passengers show their tickets. MTA employees can also ride free of charge if they carry their MTA employee ID card.

=== Electronic fare collection ===
In 2011, the MTA introduced electronic fare collection with a smart card called CharmCard, which is similar to and compatible with the Washington Metropolitan Area Transit Authority's smart card, SmarTrip. As such, CharmCard can also be used to pay fares for Metrobus, Metrorail, and local bus services in the DC area. Likewise, SmarTrip is accepted for in-person payments on all MTA services except MARC and commuter buses.

In 2017, MTA introduced a new mobile ticketing app called CharmPass, which allows passengers to pay fares on all MTA services using mobile devices.

As of February 2023, the MTA is procuring modern replacements for CharmCard and CharmPass, which are "quickly reaching end-of-life".

== Special programs ==
=== Baltimore City Public School System ===
An agreement between the Baltimore City Public School System and the Maryland Transit Administration provided eligible BCPSS students with a color-coded booklet of dated tickets each month during the school year and an identification card. The tickets allowed students to ride on MTA buses, light rail, and subway free going to and from school. The farebox was able to issue magnetic transfers to ticket holders who must use more than one bus. They were valid for 90 minutes of unlimited travel at the driver's discretion. In 2011, a new agreement was put in place for the students. Instead of the color-coded booklet, they were issued a monthly bus pass called an S-Pass. It is a bus pass that is valid for the given month from 6 am until 8 pm. The S-Pass can allow students to ride and pass through an unlimited times through the Metro Subway gate, unlike the transfers from the color-coded booklet from in the past.

=== MTA college pass ===
The Maryland Transit Administration has a special program set up with 24 Baltimore area colleges and universities which allows college students who are enrolled in a minimum of 6 hours per week can receive a monthly pass for $52.90.

==== Participating colleges ====
- Anne Arundel Community College
- Baltimore City Community College
- Baltimore International College
- Catonsville Community College
- Notre Dame of Maryland University
- Coppin State University
- Dundalk Community College
- Essex Community College
- Harrison Career Institute
- Johns Hopkins University
  - Homewood Campus
  - School of Medicine
  - School of Nursing
  - School of Public Health
  - School of Radiology
- Morgan State University
- Stevenson University (formerly Villa Julie College)
- Towson University
- University of Baltimore
- University of Maryland, Baltimore
- University of Maryland, Baltimore County

== Police force ==
Maryland Transit Administration Police
- Abbreviation: MTAP

Agency overview
- Formed: 1971
- Employees: 230

Jurisdictional structure
- Operations jurisdiction: Maryland, USA
- General nature: Civilian police

Operational structure
- Headquarters: Baltimore, Maryland
- Officers: 187 approx. (as of 2017)
- Civilians: 40 approx. (as of 2017)
- Agency executive: Colonel Jerome Howard, Chief of Police
- Parent agency: Maryland Transit Administration

Website
- mta.maryland.gov/police

The MTA employs its own force of 150 police officers to protect the transit system and its passengers, the Maryland Transit Administration Police. The department was founded on October 1, 1971, by act of the Maryland State Legislature as the Mass Transit Administration Police Force. On October 1, 2001, when the Mass Transit Administration was renamed the Maryland Transit Administration, the police force changed its name to reflect the change. Its officers are certified by the Maryland Police and Correctional Training Commission and have full police powers. In 2015 and 2016 MTA Police were awarded the APTA Gold Safety Award. The MTA Police had the lowest Part One crime reported for 2015 & 2016 among the top 12 transit agencies in the country. They reported no homicides, no shootings or rapes for those two years.

== Administrators ==
The following people have served as Administrators of the Maryland Transit Administration and its predecessor agencies.

- Walter J. Addison: 1969–1979
- L.A. Kimball: 1979–1984
- Ronald J. Hartman: 1984–1993
- John Agro: 1993–1997
- Ronald Freeman: 1997–2001
- Virginia White: 2001–2002 (acting)
- Robert L. Smith: 2002–2004
- Lisa Dickerson: 2004–2007
- Paul J. Wiedefeld: 2007–2009
- Ralign T. Wells: 2009–2013
- Robert L. Smith: 2013–2015
- Ronald Barnes: 2015 (acting)
- Paul W. Comfort: 2015–2017
- Kevin B. Quinn: 2017–2021
- Holly Arnold: 2021–2026
- Tony Bridges: 2026–present

== See also ==
- List of Maryland Transit Administration bus routes
- Baltimore Streetcar Museum
- Baltimore-Washington Superconducting Maglev Project
