= Johns Hopkins Bayview Medical Center =

Hospital in Baltimore, Maryland, US

- Johns Hopkins Medicine

Geography
- Location: Baltimore, Maryland, United States
- Coordinates: 39.2929°N 76.5513°W

Organization
- Type: Teaching, Burn Center
- Affiliated university: Johns Hopkins University

Services
- Emergency department: Level II Trauma Center
- Beds: 420

Helipads
- Helipad: (ICAO: 06MD)

History
- Founded: 1773

Links
- Website: http://www.hopkinsbayview.org/
- Lists: Hospitals in Maryland

Johns Hopkins Bayview Medical Center (abbreviated JHBMC or Bayview; formerly Francis Scott Key Medical Center and Baltimore City Hospital) is the teaching hospital trauma center, neonatal intensive care unit, geriatrics center, and is home to the Johns Hopkins Burn Center, the only adult burn trauma in Maryland, containing about 420 beds. Located in southeast Baltimore City, Maryland, along Eastern Avenue near Bayview Boulevard, it is part of the Johns Hopkins Health System and named after its close proximity to the Chesapeake Bay. Founded in 1773 as an almshouse, it was relocated several times until its now present location in 1866. In 1925, it transitioned into several municipal hospitals, which transferred ownership to Johns Hopkins Hospital in 1984.

== History ==
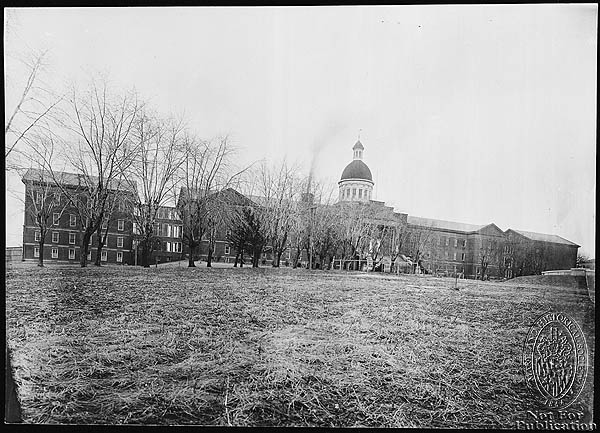
Bayview Asylum

Founded in 1773, the Johns Hopkins Bayview Medical Center, is one of the oldest, continuous health care institutions on the East Coast. From its inception as the "Baltimore County and Town Almshouse," for the impoverished, It was initially located half a mile west of the city, however, gradual expansion of the city caused a number of relocations. In 1820, the facility was moved to the Calverton mansion, the recently acquired country home of banker Dennis A. Smith. Calverton was used until 1866, when the institution made its final move to its present location east of the city and changed its name to Bay View Asylum because of its close proximity to the Chesapeake Bay where it housed both the impoverished and mentally ill. During the mid-1880s, William H. Welch, the pathologist of Johns Hopkins, began seeing patients as part of his research, creating the first major connection between the asylum and Johns Hopkins.

Its transition to a hospital began in 1925, where it transitioned to an acute care hospital, a chronic care hospital, and a tuberculosis hospital. Renamed Baltimore City Hospitals, the hospitals continued to accept psychiatric patients until those patients were moved to state institutions in the 1930s. In 1984, the City of Baltimore transferred ownership of the long-established Baltimore City Hospitals to The Johns Hopkins Hospital and The Johns Hopkins University, who renamed it, the "Francis Scott Key Medical Center", which name it carried until 1994 when it was changed to the Johns Hopkins Bayview Medical Center, in efforts to convey its strong connection with Johns Hopkins Medicine.

== Operations ==
Johns Hopkins Bayview has 426 licensed beds and 45 neonatal beds and is home to one of Maryland's most comprehensive neonatal intensive care units, a sleep disorders center, a comprehensive neurosurgery center/neurocritical care unit, an area-wide trauma center, the state's only regional burn center equipped with 20 beds, and a wide variety of nationally recognized post-acute care and geriatrics programs. In 2018, Johns Hopkins submitted a proposal to state regulators to allocate $469 million to renovating Bayview to incorporate state-of-the-art operating rooms, expand services in speciality care and providing patients with private rooms to reduce the risks of disease transmissions. Bayview has dedicated its financial resources to updating the emergency and cancer departments, and this new proposal seeks to provide a seven-story inpatient building to modernize the center's services.

=== Education and training ===
Bayview also serves as an academic teaching hospital, all physicians at the hospital also being faculty for the Johns Hopkins School of Medicine. Bayview offers medical residency programs in internal medicine, and post-graduate year one pharmacy as well as an administrative residency. Bayview also serves to instruct Johns Hopkins School of Nursing students, the top ranking nursing school in the United States.

=== Richman Family Precision Medicine Center of Excellence in Alzheimer's Disease ===
The Richman Family Precision Medicine Center of Excellence in Alzheimer's Disease is a research center based at Bayview and Johns Hopkins University that is focused on Alzheimer's disease and dementia. The center is part of Johns Hopkins inHealth, an institution-wide precision medicine initiative, and its founding director is Constantine G. Lyketsos. The stated goals of the center include development of disease biomarkers and therapeutics to enhance personalized treatment of Alzheimer's disease. Approximately 15 faculty contribute expertise ranging from brain imaging and big data analysis to development of stem cell and extracellular vesicle approaches to AD. The center also has several collaborations, such as a program of the Hellenic Initiative Against Alzheimer's Disease (HIAAD).

== Governance ==
Johns Hopkins Bayview is governed by both a Board of Trustees and Leadership, headed by Richard G. Bennett since 2006. Bayview is part of the Johns Hopkins Health System Corporation, which includes 5 other hospitals (including the Johns Hopkins Hospital). In 1997, the Johns Hopkins Health System joined their governance structure with the Johns Hopkins University School of Medicine creating Johns Hopkins Medicine.

As of January 2020, Bayview employs 3,416 people, with 2924.01 full time equivalents.

== Community relations ==
Johns Hopkins Bayview has partnered with non-profit, business, and community organizations to spearhead efforts to engage the surrounding Baltimore community and address access to equitable healthcare services, housing, economic development, and other socioeconomic issues, which has become represented by the hospitals Healthy Community Partnership. The Community Relations Department manages the organization's relations with local partners and are members of the hospital's Medical Center Community Advisory Board and the Community Health Action Project (CHAP). Services offered to residents of East Baltimore and the surrounding community include Care-A-Van, which is a free, mobile clinic offered to uninsured pregnant women and children. This program offers people immunizations and primary medical care, and grants patients the opportunity to become educated on different medical issues.

Despite the hospital's efforts to engage in the community, the medical center has faced criticism as a result of social and legal issues. In 2008, the Baltimore Sun concluded that Bayview medical center, along with Johns Hopkins Hospital, had filed 14,000 lawsuits against patients from 2003 to 2008 for unpaid medical bills, with the number of new cases steadily rising over the past few years. A majority of the patients, low-income African Americans, expressed discontent over the not-for-profit hospital's concern over unpaid medical bills, as hospitals of this caliber receive federal, state, and local reimbursements each year to continue operations. The average value of medical services is rising each year, particularly for those without health insurance, creating a financial stress for low-income residents.

=== Controversies ===
While Bayview medical center has a reputation for its clinical services, the hospital has not always been exempt from medical malpractice and patient safety. Radiologists did not notice a fracture on a CT scan of patient, promoting her to wait months to have the issue resolved. When questioning the hospital over its role in rectifying these types of issues in the future, the hospital acknowledged her concern but did not answer her question. A year after this incident, inspectors resolved that radiologists again had overlooked fatal embolisms on a patient's CT scan of their chest. These issues resulted in medical violations filed against the hospital, with the first issue being cited as a concern of patient safety and delay in diagnosis.

Another issue involves research and experimentation, a 24-year-old woman perished after being a test subject in a research experiment at Bayview. The previously healthy woman, Ellen Roche, volunteered for a physiological study attempting to induce asthmatic reactions in people without asthma to determine the bronchiolar reflexes react in different people, which was directed by Dr. Alkis Togias, an associate professor and clinical immunologist at the Johns Hopkins Medical Institutions. Despite receiving informed consent prior to the start of the trial, Roche was not made aware of the potential fatal implications of the research study, only being told of the potential side effects of wheezing, chest tightness, and transient dyspnea. In the second phase of the experiment, hexamethonium, a drug blocking lung relaxation caused by deep breathing, was administered to Roche and all test participants. Despite the drug's known adverse effects in the 1950s, the research study used the drug, which is not approved by the Federal Food and Drug Administration (FDA), and ultimately resulted in Roche contracting flu-like symptoms and a 35% reduction in her lung function within 36 hours and her death. Roche's death raised questions about the ethical treatment of test subjects, and her death was reported to the university's Institutional Review Board and to the Office of Human Research.

== Clinical reform ==
In 2005, the Johns Hopkins Center for Innovative Medicine devised the idea of the Miller-Coulson Academy in an effort to adhere to the pillars of research, education, patient and clinical care, and health systems management associated with academic health centers.

The academy's inaugural class became focused on the Department of Medicine, and invited eight physicians to join, with the stipulation that 20 hours of service annual was required to maintain membership. The clinical portfolios of these physicians were reviewed by a body of medical officials comprised across different medical institutions.
